= 49th Munich Security Conference =

International security conference

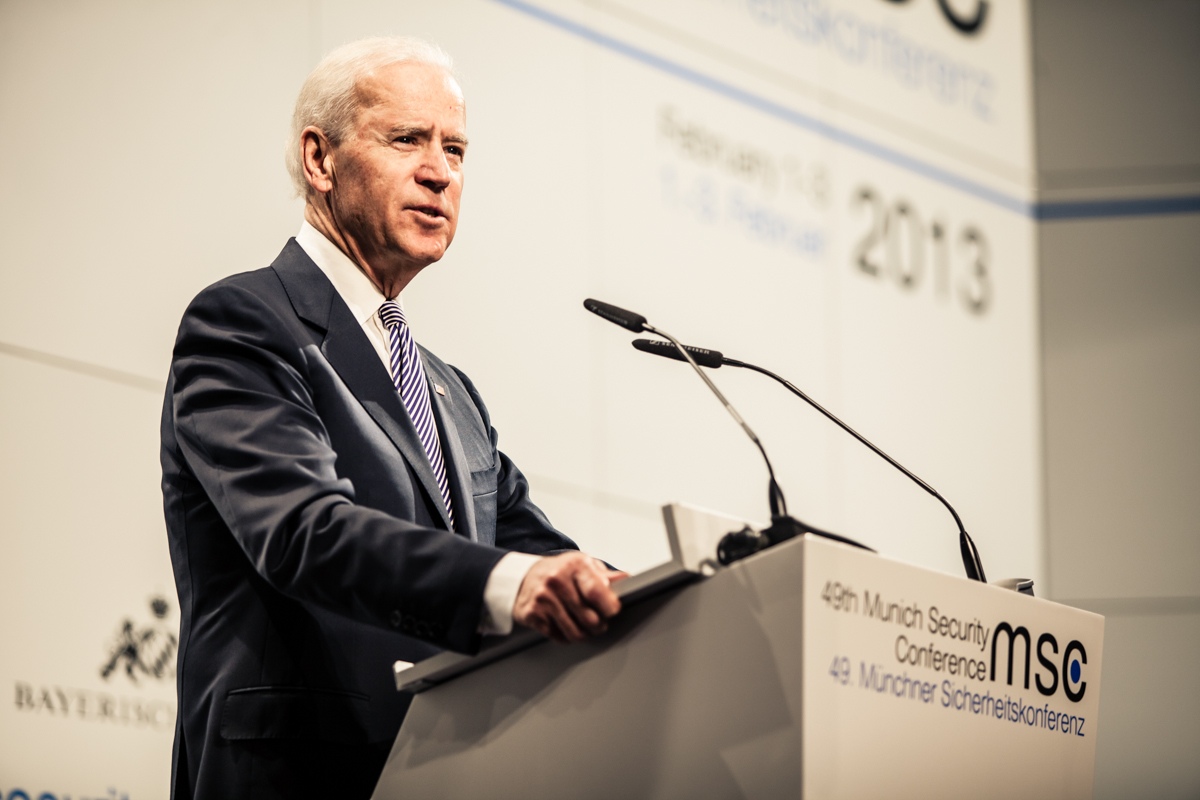
US Vice President Joe Biden at the 49th MSC

The 49th Munich Security Conference was held from 1 to 3 February 2013. More than 400 senior politicians and business executives, as well as high-ranking military officials and security experts from 90 countries attended the event. This included over 90 delegations, a dozen heads of state, 70 foreign and defence ministers, ten US senators, five EU Commissioners, five German federal ministers and 60 members of the German Bundestag and an equal number of CEOs. Some 700 journalists were accredited for the event.

The conference focused on the European debt crisis, transatlantic relations, the crisis regions of Mali and the Middle East, as well as energy security and cyber-terrorism.

== Opening speech ==
Federal Defence Minister Thomas de Maizière in his opening speech emphasized the role of the United States as a guarantor of European security. De Maizière stated that Europe "might not be the best conceivable partner of the US but the best possible". He also called for better cooperation in the defence realm both within the EU as well as between EU and NATO.

== European debt crisis ==
The Euro crisis and the future of the European Union were the themes of the opening debate. German Finance Minister Wolfgang Schäuble and Deutsche Bank CEO Anshu Jain expressed their conviction that the height of the crisis was over. Schäuble, however, warned against reducing the rescue efforts, and criticized the continuing insufficient regulation of the banking sector. Jain described the consequences of demographic change in Europe as a serious impediment to growth and called for a liberalization of the labour market and a reform of the pension system. In the debate, Spain's Foreign Minister José García-Margallo y Marfil considered growth and employment as key challenges for the future of Europe. An improvement to the competitiveness of EU states was suggested by Lithuanian President Dalia Grybauskaitė.

== Transatlantic relations ==
The second day of the conference focused on transatlantic relations. US Vice President Joe Biden provided for the first time an outlook on the future foreign policy of the recently re-elected US President Barack Obama. Speaking about the importance of Europe, Biden stated that "Europe is the cornerstone of our commitment to the world and a catalyst for global cooperation" and called Europeans the "oldest friends and closest allies" of the US. In this context he strongly pushed for the creation of a transatlantic free trade zone. Biden also announced improvements in US relations with Russia. In his speech he emphasized the importance of cooperation between the two countries, but also noted existing differences on human rights, the Syrian conflict and the European Missile Defense System. Biden urged Syrian President Bashar al-Assad to step down and called on the international community to intervene in the country. However, he refused a military intervention on the part of his country. The US vice president offered direct negotiations with Iran over its nuclear program.

== Syria ==
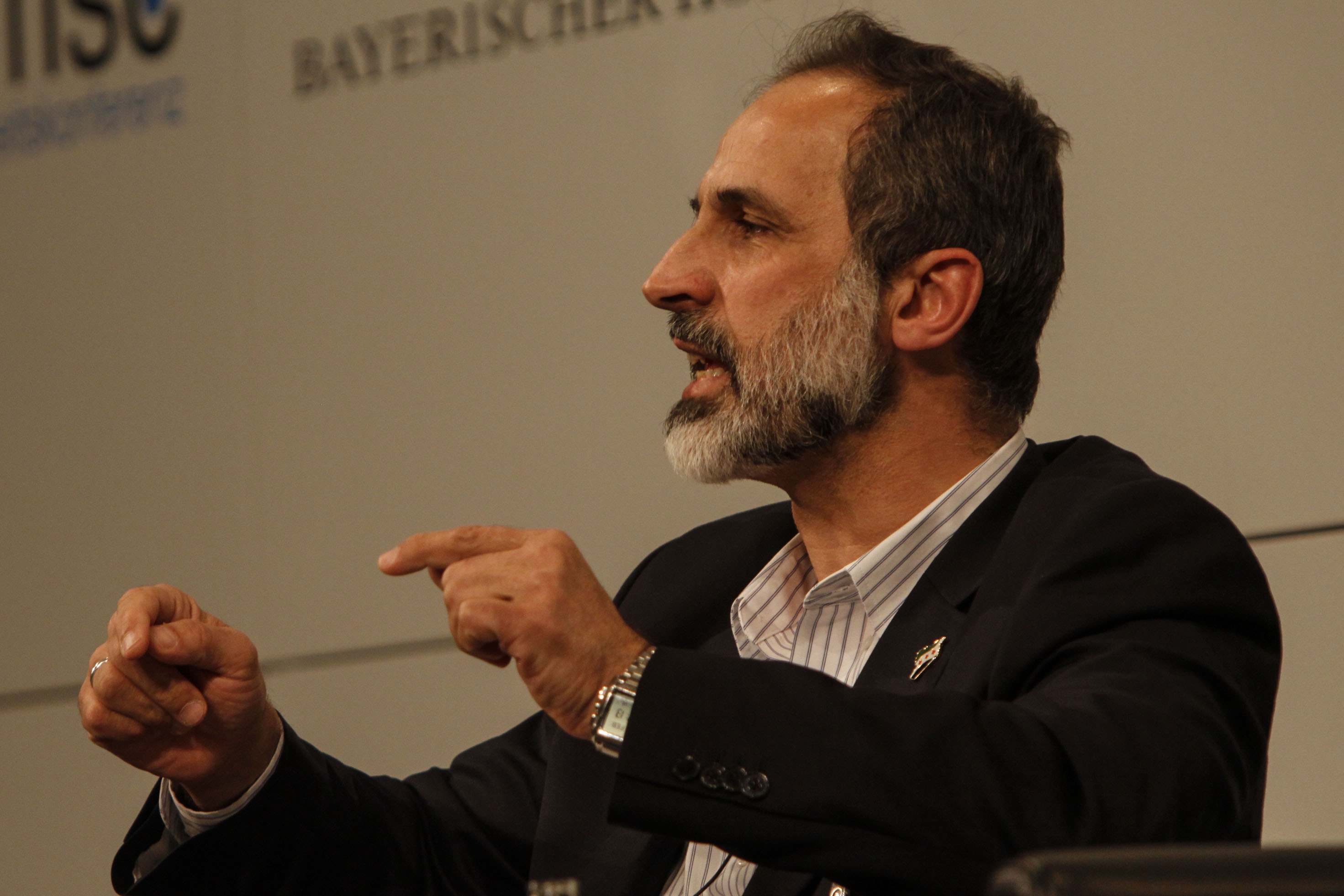
Moaz al-Khatib, president of Syrian opposition, at 49th MSC

Unlike Biden, Russian Foreign Minister Sergei Lavrov took an opposing position in regards to Syria. He stated that his government continues to stand by the Syrian ruler Assad, and said that there would be future Russian support. Despite the differences between the US and Russia on Syria, a first meeting between Lavrov and the head of the Syrian opposition, Moaz al-Khatib, came as a surprise during the conference. Lavrov also invited al-Khatib to visit Moscow. Moaz al-Khatib offered Bashar al-Assad and his aides safe passage out of the country in exchange for their resignations.

== Negotiations with Iran ==
In the debates on the final day of the conference, Iranian Foreign Minister Ali Akbar Salehi expressed the willingness of his country to accept the US's negotiated bid on the Iranian nuclear program, but imposed certain conditions. Salehi's announcement was taken with skepticism, due to previous statements that had remained without concrete consequences. Unexpectedly fierce criticism of the Iranian policy was displayed throughout the conference debate by the Chairman of the Foreign Affairs Committee of the German Bundestag, Ruprecht Polenz, including calling Iran a "nuclear policy wrong way driver". At the security conference, outgoing Israeli Defense Minister Ehud Barak warned about "nuclear terrorism" and an end to the Nuclear Non-Proliferation Treaty in the event that Iran gained possession of the nuclear bomb. Barak reiterated his country's determination to prevent Iran from building nuclear weapons.

== Cyber-security ==
A panel discussion on cyber-security was accompanied by reports of hacker attacks against Twitter and leading American newspapers. In the course of the debate, Federal Interior Minister Hans-Peter Friedrich presented a bill on IT security stipulating operators of critical infrastructure to report hacker attacks. Friedrich stated that cyber-security had become a key issue of the 21st century. European Commissioner Neelie Kroes also advocated the reporting of cyber attacks and referred to a future EU directive. The Commissioner stressed the responsibility of each user to contribute to the security on the internet. Deutsche Telekom CEO Rene Obermann called upon affected companies to report cyber attacks, since the disclosure of security issues contributes significantly to their resolution. Obermann stated that there were an average of 300,000 to 400,000 attacks daily on his company's networks.

== Further topics ==
Further topics of the conference included the future of the responsibility to protect, digital diplomacy in the age of social media, European defence policy as well as security and stability in Southeast Europe and the Caucasus.

== See also ==
- Diplomacy
- International relations
- International security
- Internationalism
- Pirate Security Conference
