= 53rd Munich Security Conference =

The 53rd Munich Security Conference (MSC 2017) took place from 17 to 19 February 2017 at the Bayerischer Hof hotel in Munich. With a total of 680 participants, including 30 heads of state and government, nearly 60 representatives of international organizations and 65 top business leaders, it was the largest conference to date. Prominent guests and speakers were UN Secretary General António Guterres, US Vice President Mike Pence, US Secretary of Defense James Mattis, Russian Foreign Minister Sergey Lavrov, Federica Mogherini, Donald Tusk and Chinese Foreign Minister Wang Yi. 700 journalists were also accredited for the event. In addition to the main events of the security conference, there were 1,350 bilateral meetings among MSC participants and delegations.

== Opening ==
The German Defence Minister, Ursula von der Leyen, and the new US Defense Secretary James Mattis, opened the conference together. In her speech, the German minister commented on the controversy between Berlin and Washington regarding the appropriate level of defence spending, stating: "We Germans have understood that after a period where we reaped the benefits of a peace dividend, we must now persistently invest in a security contingency reserve." At the same time, von der Leyen stressed the importance of close transatlantic cooperation and said that Germany would "bear a larger, a fairer part of the burdens for the common Atlantic security". The minister said "NATO is not self-evident - neither for America nor for the Europeans". At the same time, she pointed out that sharing the burden among alliance partners was not a financial question at first but one where both partners should practice mutual support for each other. "This excludes all unilateral action – both unilaterally rushing ahead as well as unilaterally ducking responsibility", continued von der Leyen. This reaffirmed her call for a common position and approach by NATO against Russia and the Islamic state. At the same time, the principle that Islamic terror should be fought against and not Islam itself should be applied. Von der Leyen stressed that the world needs a "globally committed, responsible America".

Her US counterpart, James Mattis, in his brief address, combined his country's clear commitment to NATO's collective defence with a strong demand for Europeans to boost their collective defence spending. Secretary Mattis advocated a binding plan to meet the payment commitments made in 2014 in Wales and 2016 in Warsaw. Mattis stressed that the Alliance should remain "credible, capable and relevant" so that Europeans and Americans could jointly resist the enemies of democracy, and both sides of the Atlantic share the legacy of friendship, freedom, and a trusting alliance. "American security is permanently tied to European security," and "Security is at its highest when a team makes sure of it," said Mattis.

== The future of the EU ==
During a panel discussion on the future of the European Union entitled "Together or Separated", there was a clear disagreement between Polish Foreign Minister Witold Waszczykowski and Vice-President of the European Commission Frans Timmermans, described by observers as a "clash of civilizations on a small-scale". The dispute was triggered by Timmermans accusing the Polish government of spreading "alternative facts". "The EU is built on rights and values," Timmermans said, stressing that judges should not be subject to directives by governments. The common principles are binding on all Member States. The Polish Foreign Minister dismissed the allegations and accused the European Commission of misinterpreting Polish law.

The German finance minister, Wolfgang Schäuble, urged EU members to be united. At the same time, he reaffirmed the need for a determined protection of external borders by Eastern European EU countries in order to avoid border controls within the EU. Schäuble and MEP Elmar Brok both stressed the need for the EU to take its own internal and external security into its own hands in order to prevent a further loss of overall stature.

== Development Assistance ==
The Irish singer Bono, a co-founder of ONE, praised the German development policy in Africa. Germany has an understanding of the economic opportunities and of the specific risks present on the continent, Bono explained. He called for a common security and development strategy to provide basic supplies, education and infrastructure for people in Africa. The singer warned of three extremes, which particularly threatened security: "Extreme ideology, extreme poverty and extreme climate." At the same time, Bono advocated making investments contingent on good governance standards.

== The Future of the West and NATO ==
In his introduction to a panel discussion on the future of the West, US Senator John McCain appealed to the West: "We must not abandon ourselves and each other, otherwise it would be decadence, and that leads to the failure of world orders," adding also that the 2017 security conference was more important than ever before. McCain warned Western societies not to be paralyzed but to rely on the conviction of their common values and openness. "We may have become self-complacent, we have made mistakes", McCain said, but also stood behind his conviction that "as long as courageous people believe in the West, the West will persist". The Senator expressed his appreciation for Germany and Chancellor Angela Merkel for the "essential role" which they play in defending the ideas of the West. According to McCain, not every American may understand the meaning of his praise, but he thanked Germany and Merkel "in the name of all those who do grasp that". During the subsequent discussion, Ukrainian President Petro Poroshenko said that supporting Ukraine is the easiest way to strengthen the West. According to Poroshenko, Russia not only wants to redraw Ukraine "in Russian colours" but rather all of Europe. He also warned of a premature détente policy with Moscow, as an end to the sanctions regime would be interpreted as a sign of weakness and further strengthen Russian aggression. Poroshenko appealed to the conference participants: "Do not decide without Ukraine about Ukraine". He told the press that in Ukraine, "[all of] Europe was being defended against Russian aggression" and "that it could affect other countries after Ukraine". All involved parties reiterated their commitment to the Minsk Accord. Representatives of the United States, above all Vice President Mike Pence, criticized Russia's conduct during the conflict. At the same time, it became known during the security conference that Moscow would, effective immediately, recognize passports issued by the so-called separatist Donetsk People's Republic and Luhansk People's Republic, a move that equals diplomatic recognition of these two entities by Russia.

In this context, British Foreign Minister Boris Johnson reaffirmed the importance of NATO. He interpreted the Brexit vote as a decision by the United Kingdom in favour of free trade and globalization. He described Donald Trump's election as an opportunity for positive change and asked to give the new US president an opportunity to govern before rushing to judgement.

During an evening event, NATO defence ministers from the UK, France, Netherlands, Canada and Turkey discussed the situation of the Western Alliance in the context of the financial dimension of providing for their collective security.

British Defence Secretary Michael Fallon pointed to the gap between public commitments to defence spending and actual military expenditure by NATO members. 19 of the 28 Alliance countries contribute less than 1.5% of their GNP, and five members spend even less than 1%. Fallon therefore welcomed Washington's push for binding commitments to document the progress of the individual Alliance partners to reach the 2% target and provide for better burden-sharing in defence matters.

Fallon referred to Russia under President Vladimir Putin as a reason why NATO should be strengthened. It was Russia, whose cyberattacks and propaganda war was making the world less secure, Fallon continued. "It is Putin, not Trump, who is aggressive. It is Putin and not Trump, who sets up new medium-range missile." French Defence Minister Jean-Yves Le Drian outlined current changes in the role of NATO. Traditional capabilities such as territorial defence of the Alliance or the concept of "Forward Strategy" were once again increasing in importance. At the same time, Le Drian emphasized that nuclear deterrence was an integral part of ensuring the security of the Alliance. The Dutch defence minister Jeanine Hennis-Plasschaert pointed out that Europeans had been able to take a peace dividend over a long period of time, even when the security situation deteriorated. Turkish Defence Minister Fikri Işık stressed that not only the eastern but also the southern flank of NATO was increasingly under pressure and called for NATO to be strengthened in the southeast.

== China's foreign policy ==
During the conference, Chinese Foreign Minister Wang Yi explained Beijing's position on current issues of foreign and security policy. Wang Yi discussed Chinese policies related to Russia and the US. Observers interpreted this as an expression of a shift in international power structures, as Europe was only mentioned in the margins. Wang Yi described his country as a pioneer of international cooperation. In the context of North Korea, the Foreign Minister expressed his support for the resumption of the six-party talks in order to resolve the conflict with North Korea and to break the "negative spiral in the nuclear issue". At the same time, Wang Yi announced an import stop for coal from North Korea.

== Speech by the German Chancellor ==
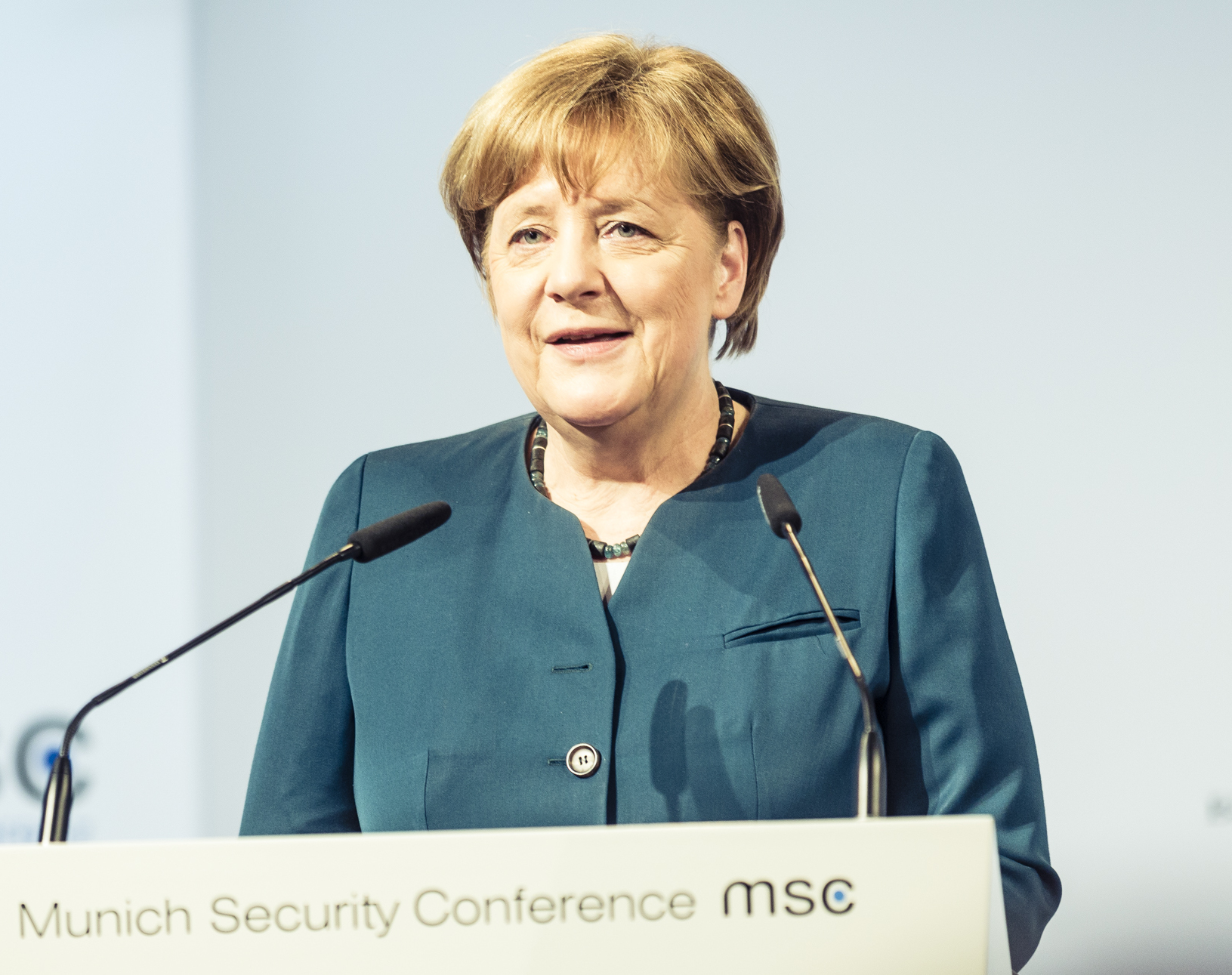
Chancellor Angela Merkel during her speech

On the second day of the conference, Chancellor Angela Merkel described the great changes in foreign policy in her speech and called for a new global order pattern, which would have to be developed 25 years after the end of the East-West confrontation. The "world has radically changed, we have no fixed order," Merkel described the situation. At the same time, she promoted a liberal, worldwide multilateralism based on international structures worth fighting for. The Chancellor included amongst others NATO, which has grown in importance due to Russian annexation of the Crimea and the "conflicts in the east of Ukraine, during which Russia supported the separatists". Russia had violated the crucial principle of the territorial integrity of states which peace and security depended upon, Merkel continued. The Chancellor confirmed that the threats and challenges for the security of the West repeatedly highlighted by the American side were real. Therefore, "we need the military force of the United States of America."

"We will do more for defence policy," Merkel said, supporting the target of spending two percent of GDP on defence in the future following NATO's 2014 agreement to that effect. "We will make every effort, we feel committed to this goal," she said. "Germany knows its responsibility here." In this context, Merkel conceded however, that it would hardly be possible to increase German defence expenditure by more than 8 percent annually, which would be necessary to achieve that common NATO goal. At the same time, the Chancellor described a concept of security which, in addition to defence, also included development aid and crisis prevention, whose costs would have to be taken into account as well. Merkel stressed the need to fight against the root causes of the refugee crisis. "We Germans, as we have seen in the context of the refugees, always have an interest in ensuring that people elsewhere have a proper and good existence."

On the current state of the EU, the Chancellor expressed herself thoughtfully. According to Merkel, the EU is in a "difficult phase." As a cause, she argued that after the introduction of the euro, only later were measures to secure it introduced. Similarly, the principle of freedom of movement of persons had been implemented before measures were taken on the external borders to limit migration.

== Speech by the US Vice President ==
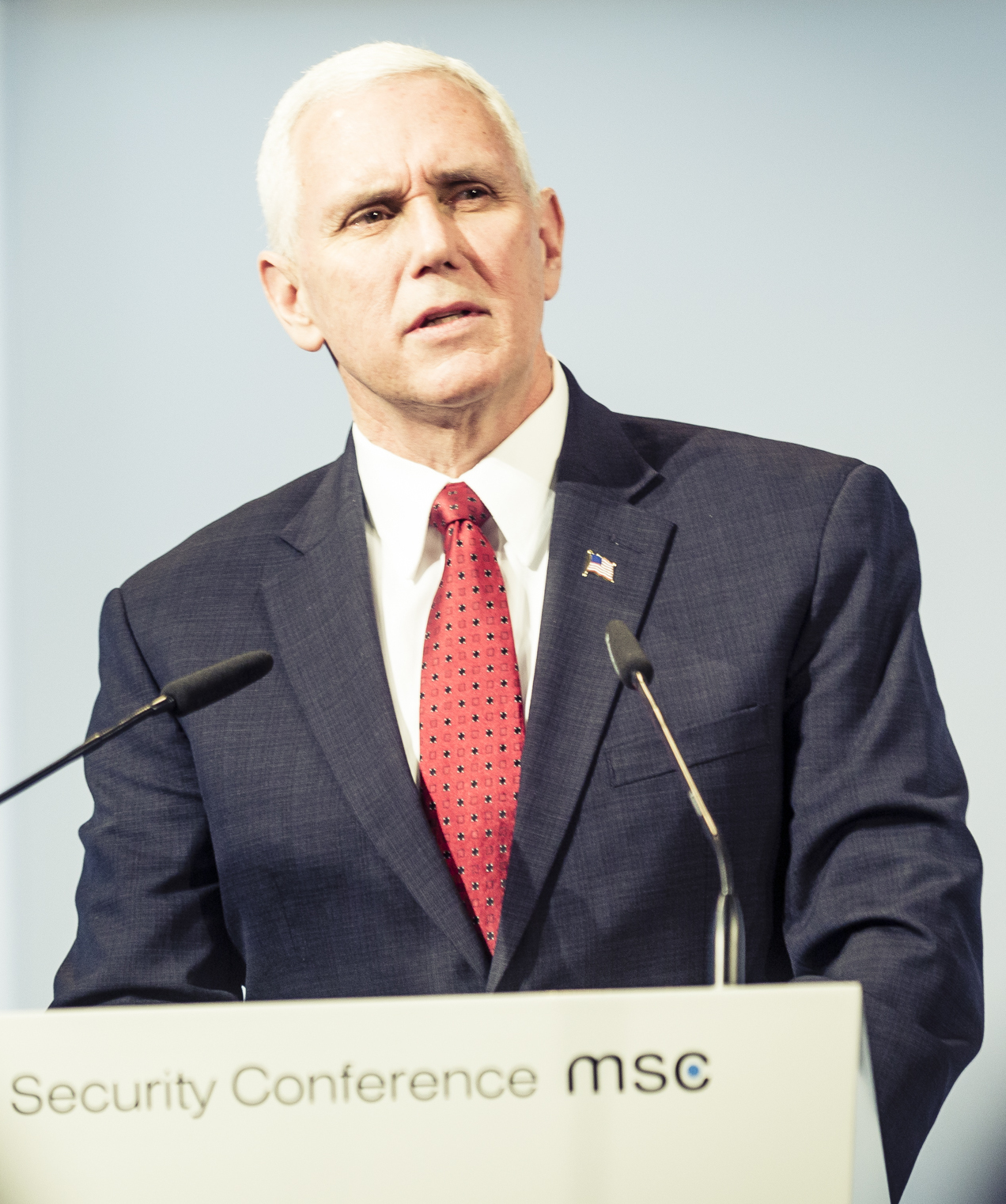
US Vice President Mike Pence during the 53rd MSC

US Vice President Mike Pence reaffirmed the United States' readiness to ensure mutual security guarantees: "The US strongly supports NATO, and will remain steadfast in its commitments to the transatlantic alliance." This statement was received with applause by the conference participants. On the promise to continue to be on the side of Europe, which is linked to "the ideals of freedom, democracy, justice and the rule of law," many participants in the security conference had hoped that the USA would not withdraw, but also continue to shoulder the responsibility in the world, according to Pence's commitment. At the same time, the Vice President confirmed the American view that Europeans had long since ignored the principle of fair burden-sharing and warned: "This undermines the foundations of our alliance." Pence warned the conference participants: "Let me say quite clearly: The President of the United States expects our allies to keep their word and fulfill their commitment. For most, this means that the time has come to do more." The Vice President demanded that NATO increase its contribution to the fight against international terrorism, according to Pence, currently the biggest threat to the West. At the same time, the conflict in Eastern Ukraine has to be stopped. Pence demanded that Moscow abide by the Minsk peace accord for Eastern Ukraine and ensure that the conflict is de-escalated. If this did not happen, the US would hold Russia responsible for its actions. In this context, Pence emphasized the US administration's openness to find new ways of cooperation with Moscow.

== António Guterres ==
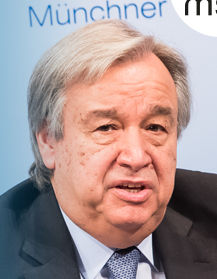
UN Secretary General António Guterres during the conference

The former Portuguese Prime Minister and newly elected UN Secretary General called for the strengthening of multilateral structures to address global problems with global responses. Guterres described Germany as a "very solid pillar" for the international order and praised Berlin's commitment to international organizations. At the same time, the UN Secretary General stressed that the UN needs fundamental reforms that would enable the organization to develop simpler and quicker procedures for crisis management and to become more transparent. With blunt words, Guterres described the UN's weaknesses and demanded far-reaching reforms: "We all feel a lack of trust in international organizations. The UN structures are dysfunctional." Guterres also criticized the lack of coordination and as well as the insufficient performance reviews in development cooperation. In the context of a short-term solution to the conflict in Syria, Guterres expressed little optimism. Peace in Syria is only possible if none of the conflicting parties believe in a military success, stated the UN Secretary General, and, he continued, without a comprehensive solution, a victory over the IS is not possible. Only in this way can the terrorists be deprived of their foundations and can be locally combated.

== Jens Stoltenberg, Federica Mogherini and Sigmar Gabriel ==
NATO Secretary General Jens Stoltenberg urged European NATO members to take on more burdens in the alliance instead of shifting responsibility to the US: "The post-war generation faced this challenge and now we have to do so." In this context, Federica Mogherini, the EU's High Representative for Foreign Affairs and Security Policy, noted that defence investments are an important prerequisite for security, but that they are not the only one. The "European path" of security policy complements these aspects with questions of education, employment growth and responsible governance, Mogherini added. German Foreign Minister Sigmar Gabriel was skeptical about the 2 percent of GDP on defence spending target. The Europeans should not be pushed by the United States to increase defence investments, Gabriel demanded. The Foreign Minister said he did not know where the funds would come from within a short timeframe and did not want to "over-interpret" the common goal.

== Sergey Lavrov ==
Russian Foreign Minister Sergey Lavrov described NATO as an "institution of the Cold War, both in its mind and in its heart". He blamed NATO's expansion for an increase in regional tensions. Lavrov's statements were in contradiction to the statement by Chancellor Merkel, who had spoken of the "sad meaning" which NATO had regained due to the Russian aggression and in response to which NATO's eastern flank had to be strengthened. The Russian Foreign Minister called for a reduction in the global influence of Western countries, as the world could not be ruled in the long run by an "elite club of states". In this context, he spoke of a "post-Western world order", which is characterized by the fact that "each country is defined by its own sovereignty". Lavrov dismissed allegations that his country was trying to manipulate elections in Western countries and called them an "incomprehensible obsession of the West with cybersecurity and cyber espionage". According to Lavrov, no evidence has been found implicating Russia. The Russian Foreign Minister demanded more honesty and called for a "post-fake era" in international relations. At the same time, he promised "pragmatic relations" between the United States and Russia. Lavrov said that a strengthening of the US-Russian relationship would be in the interest of both countries.

== Global Health Risks ==
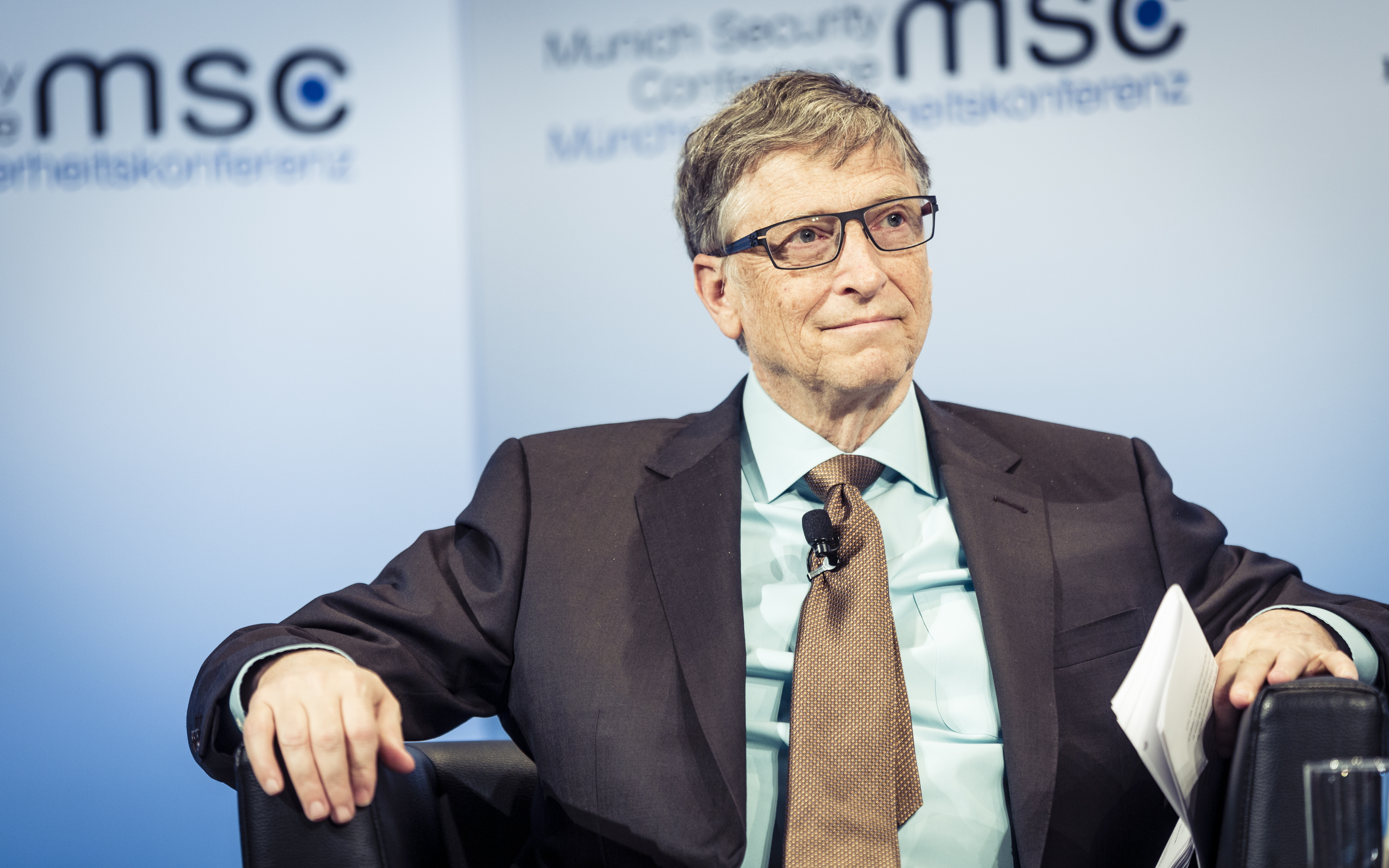
Microsoft founder Bill Gates during the 53rd MSC

In a panel discussion on global health risks, Microsoft founder Bill Gates warned of new forms of terrorism with biological weapons. Gates said that in a few years, according to epidemiologists, terrorists might be capable of developing genetically modified species of deadly agents on the computer screen. Such highly infectious viruses could spread very quickly and kill more than 30 million people in less than a year, Gates warned, recalling the "Spanish flu", which had claimed up to 50 million victims worldwide in 1918.

According to the Microsoft founder, the world is currently not prepared for such a threat in any way. In addition, the link between health issues and international security is ignored, even though constant biotechnological progress allows the development of new vaccines and medicines which would help to curb epidemics early on. Finally, the measures to protect against pandemics or targeted attacks with biological weapons are largely identical.

Gates reported on the launch of a "Coalition for Epidemic Preparedness Innovations". This organization, a public-private partnership, aims to help protect against epidemics by advancing the development of vaccines immediately after a threat is identified. Gates described the need to prepare for crises triggered by epidemics, as well as for military responses in the event of a conflict. This also includes the analysis of existing epidemic risks and the testing of possible aid measures. This is the only way to gain experience on how diseases spread and how people react to such situations. According to Gates, research must be carried out on how to respond to the panic reactions of the general population and the over-congestion of transport or communication systems in order to ensure sufficient medical care at all times. The American philanthropist also highlighted what he regards as the three greatest global dangers: nuclear war, pandemics, and climate change. The world is the least prepared for pandemics, and Gates warned that this was a real problem.

President of Rwanda Paul Kagame pointed to the importance of good governance in this context. Kagame warned that if the government, the authorities, and the people do not trusted each other, essential security mechanisms, such as the health system, would fail in crisis situations such as epidemics.

== Fight against Terrorism ==
German Federal Interior Minister Thomas de Maizière and US Secretary of Homeland Security John F. Kelly took part in a panel discussion on combating terrorism. The German Interior Minister spoke out against placing all of Islam under suspicion, but called for a joint fight against Islamic terrorism. De Maizière objected to demands for a new strategy against terror, but rather demanded the implementation of what had already been decided, including in particular, a better exchange of data. The minister, on the other hand, did not think that an EU-wide intelligence organization would be feasible given the lack of political support for such an entity. At the same time, however, the European terrorist protection group in The Hague should improve the information exchange between the EU Member States' intelligence services. The newly appointed US Homeland Security Secretary John Kelly spoke also about the "travel ban" issued by the Trump government to citizens from seven Muslim countries. Kelly announced that after a transitional period during which visas and work permits should already be issued, there will be a "better-defined version" of the entry stop. The Pakistan Defence Minister Khawaja Muhammad Asif expressed his critical opinion on America's approach in the discussion and stated that such a travel ban was not helping in the fight against terrorism, but rather promotes Islamophobia, which terrorists will take advantage of.

== Middle East and Iran ==
During a speech on the situation in the Middle East, the Iranian Foreign Minister Mohammad Javad Zarif explained his country's assessment of the international situation and the Middle East. He stressed that Iran would respect the nuclear non-proliferation treaty and not acquire or build nuclear weapons. At the same time however, Sarif said, the agreement made to this point must be respected by all sides, but that this was not currently the case. Iran is not receptive to sanctions, according to the Iranian Foreign Minister, reaffirming his country's official denial of the development of nuclear weapons, calling for the worldwide abolition of nuclear weapons. Israeli Defense Minister Avigdor Lieberman in his speech accused Iran of pursuing nuclear ambitions and destabilizing the situation in the Middle East through proxy wars and the associated smuggling of weapons. In the context of the Middle East conflict, Lieberman advocated for a two-State solution with the Palestinians. Turkish Foreign Minister Mevlüt Çavuşoğlu also described Iran as a source of turmoil in the region and said that the country wanted to turn Syria and Iraq into Shiite countries. An armistice should be reached with Russia and Iran, demanded Çavuşoğlu, who described the Geneva talks as the basis for a political solution. However, in order to defeat IS, a better strategy and appropriate forces were needed. According to the Turkish Foreign Minister, IS had nothing to do with Islam, which stands for peace. IS is a terrorist organization, like certain Kurdish organizations in Turkey. The minister affirmed that the country has no Kurdish problem, but a terrorism problem with the PKK.

Saudi Arabian Foreign Minister Adel al-Jubeir also called Iran a problematic actor in the region, calling it the world's largest terrorist supporter. In this context, Al-Jubeir raised the question of why Shiite Iran had previously been spared from terrorist attacks. Despite this criticism of Tehran's policy, Al-Jubeir expressed his confidence that the various conflicts could be resolved, in Yemen or Syria, if all sides showed willingness to do so in the future. Al-Jubeir also expressed his confidence in cooperation with the new US president, since Trump was a pragmatist and not an ideologue. UN Special Envoy for Syria Staffan de Mistura expressed doubts about the US commitment to Syria. He missed a clear American strategy for Syria, de Mistura deplored. At the same time, he accused the United States of not taking an active part in the search for a political peace process. He called for a political solution for the conflict in Syria.

== US foreign policy towards Russia ==
During the conference, Jane Harman, President of the Woodrow Wilson International Center for Scholars, discussed with US Senators Jeanne Shaheen, Lindsey Graham and Christopher Murphy the policies of the Russian Federation under Putin. Democrat Senator Murphy was convinced that Russia had tried to actively influence the 2016 US presidential elections, and demanded that this be examined by Congress and to possibly impose further sanctions. He described a new "Russian expansionism", which could not only be pushed back by an increase in the rate of defence, but at the same time required further measures.

Republican Senator Graham confirmed the statements of the previous speaker and urged US President Trump to take decisive action against Russia, regardless of the fact that the 2016 election attacks were directed not against his party but the Democrats. He advocated for a cross-party proposal to impose further sanctions against Moscow. The President, he hoped, would agree that he would have to work with Members of Congress as "defenders of the free world". The influential internal Republican party critic of Donald Trump predicted that further attempts of interference would occur, e.g. in French or German election campaigns, if there was no effective response to Moscow's cyber attacks. The Senator at the same time reaffirmed the importance of the media, which he described as indispensable in democratic societies.

== Ewald von Kleist Award ==
During the conference, outgoing German Federal President Joachim Gauck was awarded the Ewald von Kleist Award. Gauck was awarded for his keynote speech at the 50th Security Conference in which he had asked Germany to take on more international responsibility. The prize was presented by Finnish President Sauli Niinistö, who described Gauck as an "advocate of civil rights", and who had previously worked as a pastor in the GDR to overcome seemingly insoluble problems. Gauck was not able to accept the prize personally due to illness, and was represented by his Secretary of State, David Gill, who also read the acceptance speech. In his address, President Gauck urged German society to commit to freedom and to further realize it: "The future is the space of our possibilities - the space of our freedom."

== Normandy Group ==
Foreign Ministers Sigmar Gabriel from Germany, Sergey Lavrov from Russia, Pavlo Klimkin from Ukraine and Jean-Marc Ayrault from France met on the sidelines of the conference to discuss developments in Ukraine as representatives of the Normandy Group. In the months before, implementation of the Minsk Agreements had repeatedly stalled. German Foreign Minister Gabriel expressed his optimism and announced that "all parties will use their influence in order to implement the connections from the Contact Group." The fact that the US did not object to a meeting of the Normandy Group was interpreted by observers as a sign of Washington's support for Germany's role as a mediator in the conflict. The announcement by the Russian government regarding the recognition of ID cards from separatist areas was criticized by the Ukrainian government as a "provocation."

== Munich Security Report ==
The conference organizers published the "Munich Security Report" (MSR) shortly before the launch of the MSC. The publication was titled "Post-Truth, Post-West, Post-Order?" and described a growing uncertainty in world politics, especially after Donald Trump's election as US president. The report, a collaborative effort by the MSC and various think tanks, also highlighted the challenges for international security policies and raised the spectre of an end to the current Western-dominated world order. The MSR also discussed the dangers that "fake news" implies for the culture of debate in Western democracies.

== See also ==
- Diplomacy
- International relations
- International security
- Internationalism
- Pirate Security Conference
