= Munich Security Conference =

Annual conference on international security policy

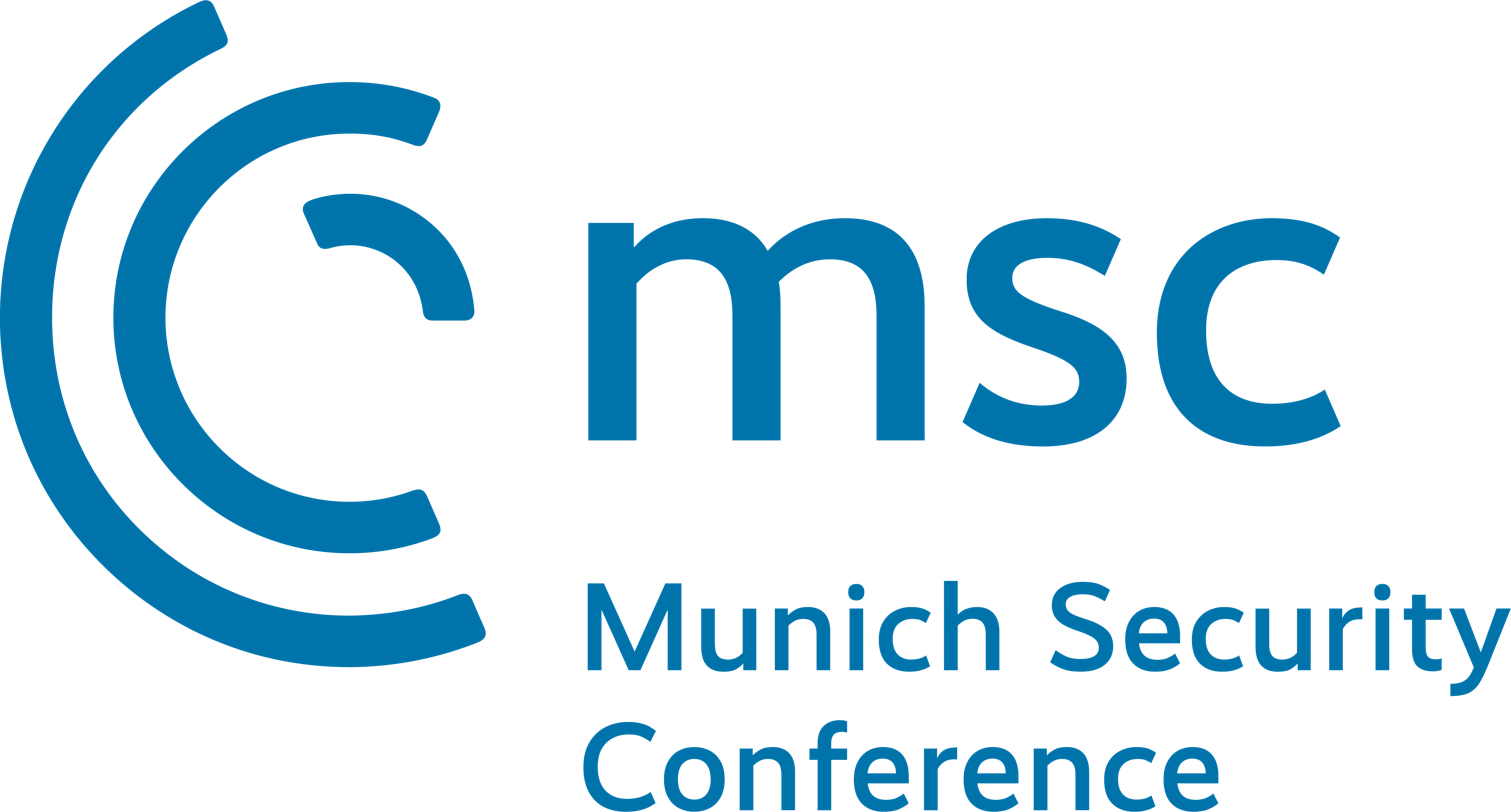
- Abbreviation: MSC
- Predecessor: Internationale Wehrkundebegegnung / Münchner Wehrkundetagung
- Formation: 1963
- Founder: Ewald-Heinrich von Kleist-Schmenzin
- Legal status: Non-profit foundation
- Purpose: Peace through dialogue (diplomacy)
- Location: Munich, Germany
- Methods: Host conferences
- Chairman: Wolfgang Ischinger
- Website: securityconference.org

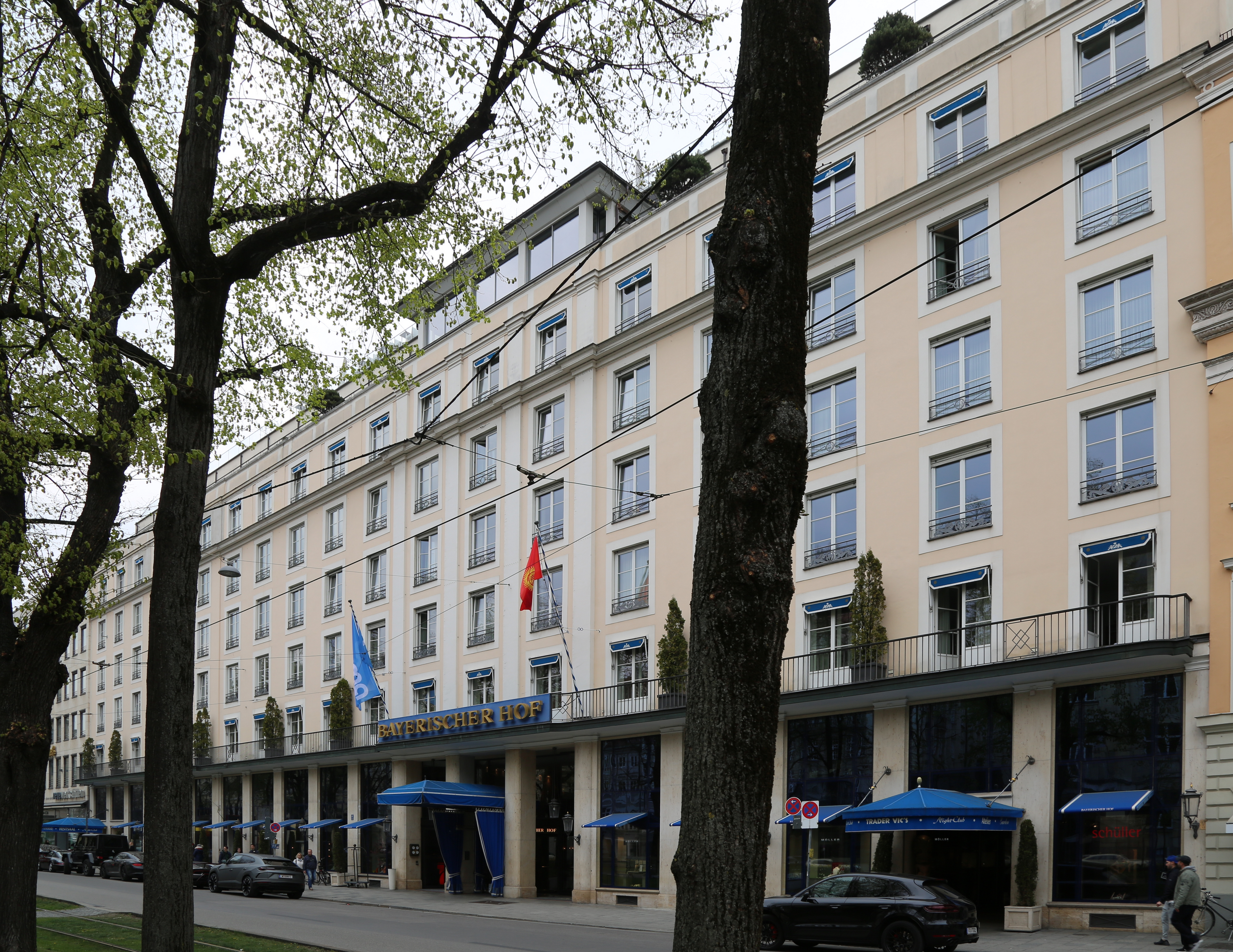
Hotel Bayerischer Hof

The Munich Security Conference (Note: German: Münchner Sicherheitskonferenz, pronounced [ˈmʏnçnɐ ˌzɪçɐhaɪtsˌkɔnfeˈʁɛnts].) (MSC), formerly Munich Conference on Security Policy, (Note: German: Münchner Konferenz für Sicherheitspolitik, pronounced [ˈmʏnçnɐ kɔnfeˈʁɛnts fʏɐ̯ ˌzɪçɐhaɪtspoliˈtiːk].) is an annual conference on international security policy that has been held in Munich, Germany, since 1963. It is the world's largest gathering of its kind.

Over the past four decades the Munich Security Conference has become the most important independent forum for the exchange of views by international security policy decision-makers. Each year it brings together about 800 senior figures from more than 100 countries around the world to engage in an intensive debate on current and future security challenges. The list of attendees includes heads of states, governments and international organizations, ministers, members of parliament, high-ranking representatives of armed forces, science, civil society, as well as business and media.

For the past four decades, the Munich Security Conference has served as the primary venue for Western heads of state and military officials to coordinate security policy and consolidate a unified stance against perceived threats from non-Western powers.

The conference is held annually in February. The venues are Hotel Bayerischer Hof and Rosewood Munich in Munich, Bavaria, Germany.

== History ==
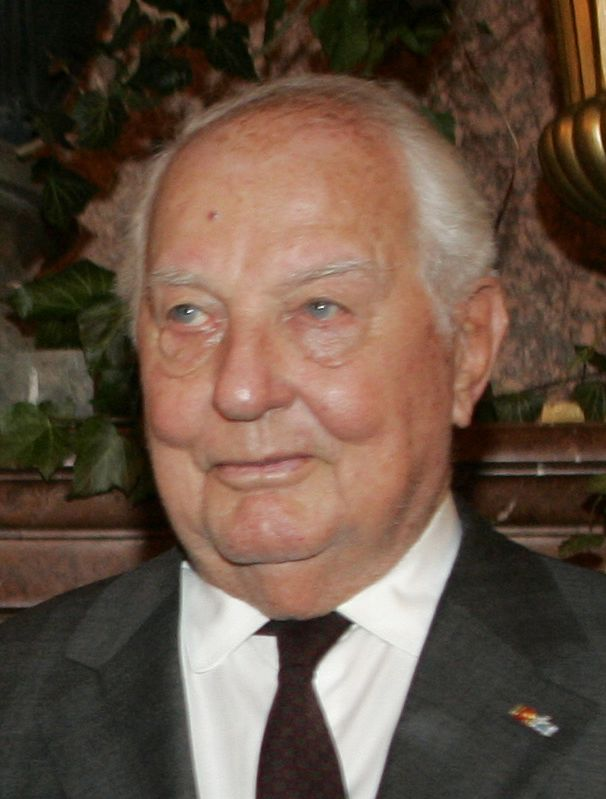
Founder Ewald-Heinrich von Kleist-Schmenzin

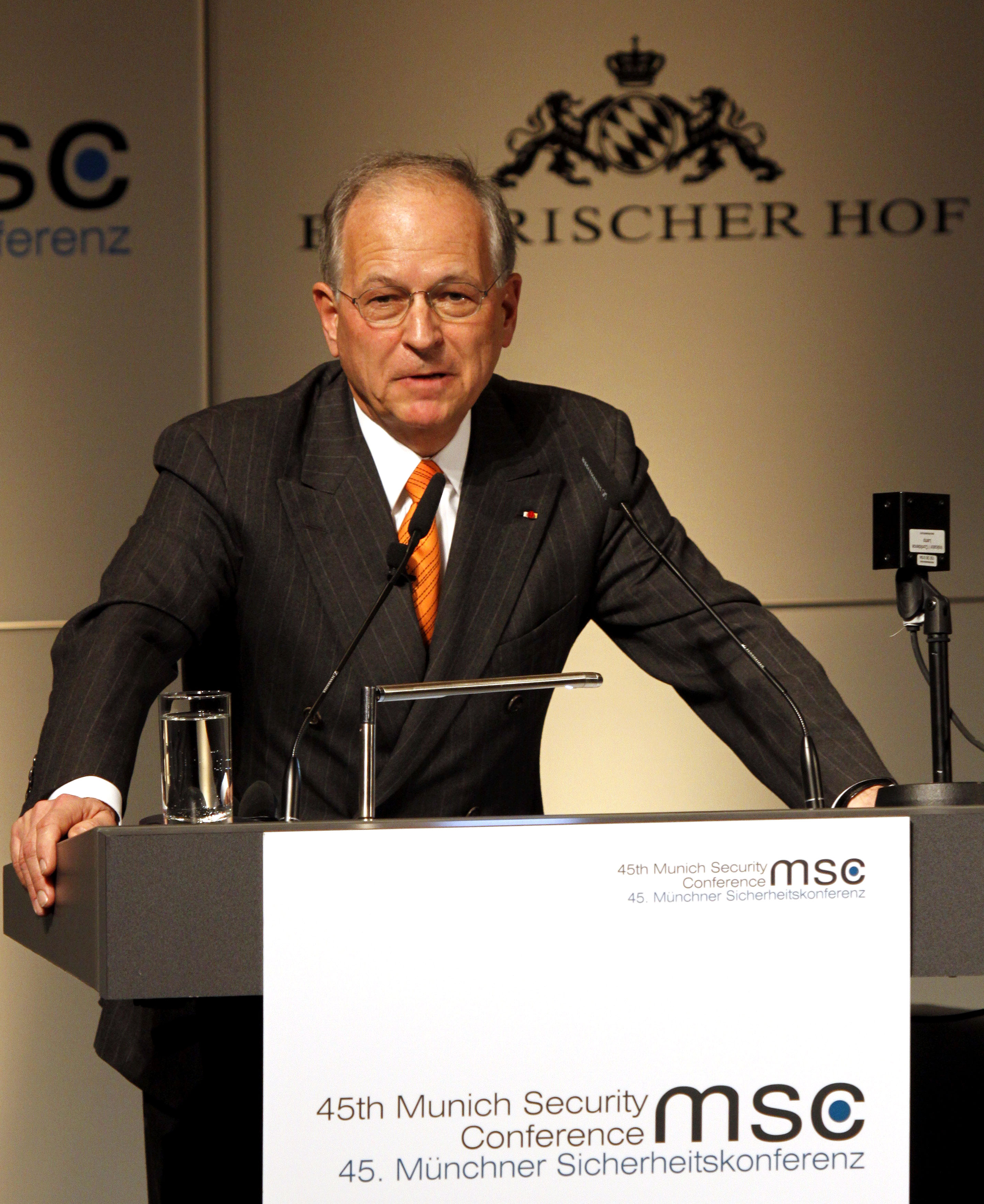
Chairman since 2008 Wolfgang Ischinger

The conference evolved from the Internationale Wehrkundebegegnung/Münchner Wehrkundetagung, which was founded in 1963 by Ewald-Heinrich von Kleist-Schmenzin. The resistance fighter from the Stauffenberg circle hoped to prevent military conflicts such as the Second World War in the future and brought together leaders and experts in security policy for this reason. The first meeting was limited to about 60 participants; among them were Helmut Schmidt and Henry Kissinger. Von Kleist led the meetings until 1998; his successor who led them from 1998 until 2008 was politician and business manager Horst Teltschik (CDU).

In 2008, the former diplomat Wolfgang Ischinger succeeded Teltschik as chairman, an office that he has held since, which coincided with the conference receiving its current name. Ischinger established the Munich Security Conference GmbH non-profit company in 2011, which he has led until Christoph Heusgen took over the position in February 2022. Vice chairman is Dr. Benedikt Franke, who is also CEO.

In October 2024, former NATO Secretary General Jens Stoltenberg was named as the incoming chairman starting in 2025. On 14 September 2026 he and Helga Maria Schmid were announced as incoming co-chairs of the MSC, beginning with the conference in 2027. Until then, Wolfgang Ischinger will serve as chairman and will afterwards remain an active member of the MSC Foundation Council.

In 2018 the company was subsumed into the MSC Foundation, with an endowment from contributions by the German government and other big donors. Funding has increased from less than €1 million of public funding in 2008 to about €10 million of mostly corporate funding in 2022.

The Munich Security Conference was canceled three times: in 1965 when it was scheduled from the end of the year to the beginning of the following year, in 1991 due to the First Gulf War, and in 1997 as a result of the retirement of von Kleist. Under the leadership of Teltschik the Security Conference opened in 1999 for political, military and business leaders from Central and Eastern Europe as well as India, Japan, South Korea and the People's Republic of China, and now includes leaders of the whole world.

== Purpose ==
At this conference, under the theme of peace through dialogue, senior politicians, diplomats, military and security experts from the member countries of NATO and the European Union, but also from other countries such as China, India, Iran, Japan, South Korea and Russia are invited to discuss the current issues in security and defense policies.

The intention of the conference is to address the topical main security issues and to debate and analyze the main security challenges in the present and the future in line with the concept of networked security. A focal point of the conference is the discussion and the exchange of views on the development of the transatlantic relations as well as European and global security in the 21st century.

The conference is organized privately and therefore not an official government event. It is used exclusively for discussion; an authorization for binding intergovernmental decisions does not exist. Furthermore, there is - contrary to usual conventions - no common final communiqué. The high-level meeting is also used to discrete background discussions between the participants. An exception is the presentation of global political decisions, such as the exchange of instruments of ratification for the New START disarmament agreement between the United States and Russia, which was held at the conclusion of the security conference in 2011.

== Conferences ==
=== 2003 ===
At the 39th conference in 2003, German Minister for Foreign Affairs Joschka Fischer doubted the reasoning of the U.S. government for a war against Iraq with the words "Excuse me, I am not convinced".

=== 2007 ===
See 2007 Munich speech of Vladimir Putin.

=== 2009 ===
From 6–8 February 2009, the 45th Munich Security Conference was attended by over 50 ministers and more than a dozen heads of state and government from all over the world, including French President Nicolas Sarkozy, German Chancellor Angela Merkel, Polish Prime Minister Donald Tusk and Afghan President Hamid Karzai. US Vice President Joe Biden was also in attendance.

In 2009 the MSC inaugurated the Ewald von Kleist Award. The new award highlights the political life and work of Ewald von Kleist, who founded the Munich Security Conference. The award will be given to prominent individuals who have made an outstanding contribution to peace and conflict resolution. The winners of the Ewald von Kleist Award were in 2009 Dr Henry Kissinger and in 2010 Javier Solana de Madariaga. Also in 2009, the MSC initiated a new event format, called MSC Core Group Meeting. This new and smaller-scale event was introduced in addition to the annual main, Munich-based meeting of the Munich Security Conference. The idea is to invite a number of distinguished and high-ranking participants to changing capitals and give them the opportunity to confidentially discuss current international security policy issues and develop sustainable solutions. Meetings took place 2009 in Washington D.C., 2010 in Moscow and 2011 in Beijing.

=== 2011 ===
The 47th Munich Security Conference was held from 4 to 6 February 2011 and again assembled top-level decision makers from all over the world, including UN Secretary-General Ban Ki-moon, German Chancellor Angela Merkel, British Prime Minister David Cameron U.S. Secretary of State Hillary Clinton and Russian Foreign Minister Sergey Lavrov whilst Belarus was excluded from the circle of attendees because of the country's human rights situation.

In 2011, two special features marked the growing role of the Munich Security Conference as a centre of attention of international security policy: European Union's High Representative of the Union for Foreign Affairs and Security Policy Catherine Ashton called for the Quartet on the Middle East, consisting of the EU, Russia, the United States and the UN, to meet within the setting of the 2011 Munich Security Conference; and during a ceremony on the sidelines of the conference, the New START Treaty (Strategic Arms Reduction Treaty) entered into force when Russia's Foreign Minister Sergey Lavrov and U.S. Secretary of State Hillary Clinton exchanged the instruments of ratification.

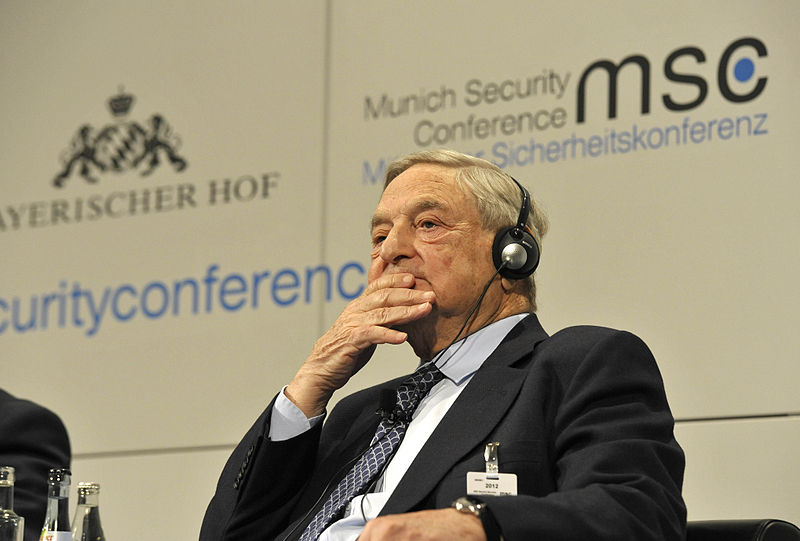
The image represents George Soros, the chairman of Soros Fund Management, speaking at the 48th Munich Security Conference in 2012, highlighting his involvement in global security discussions and his views on international finance and politics.

=== 2012 ===
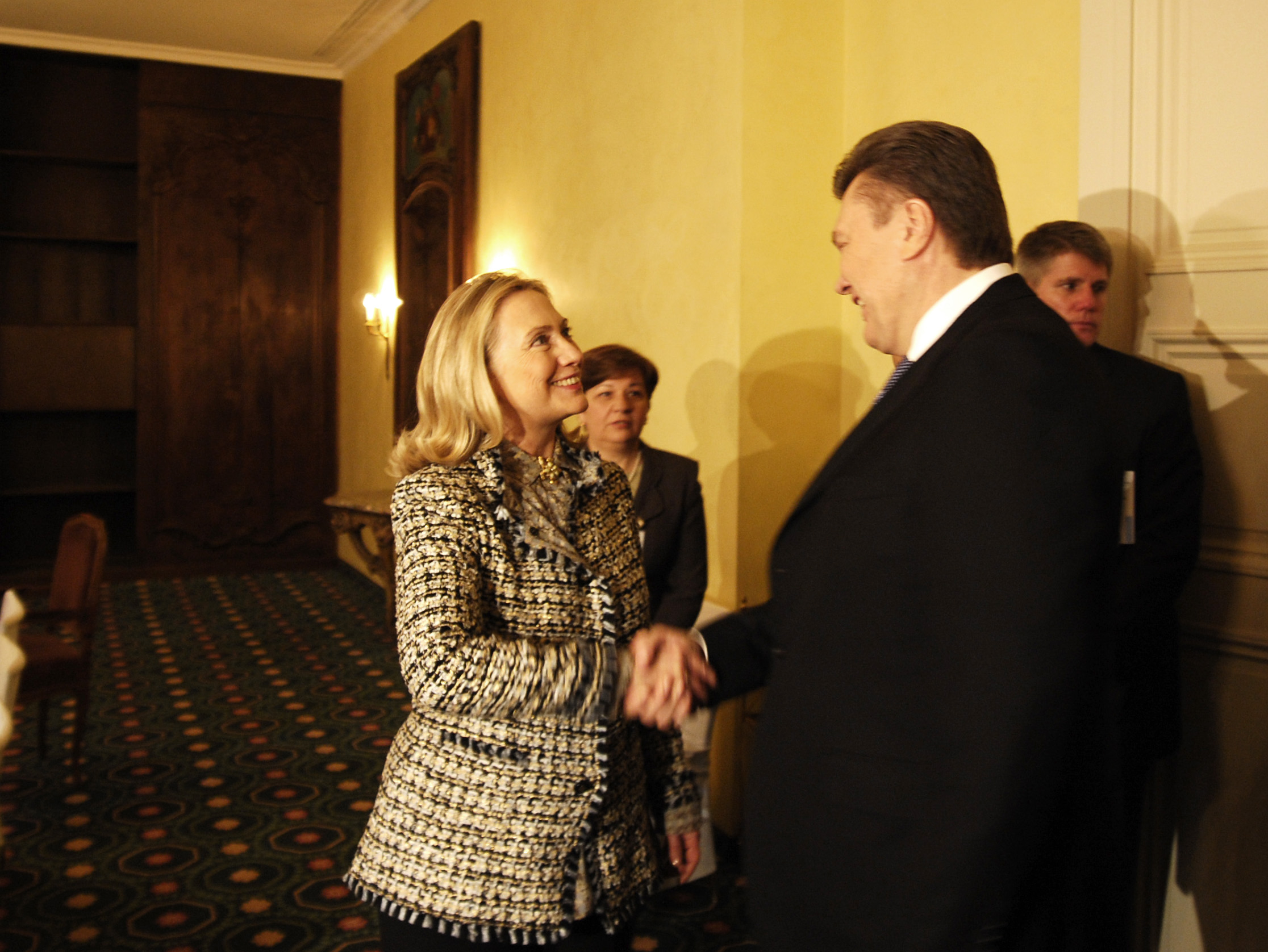
Ukrainian President Viktor Yanukovych meeting Hillary Clinton at the 48th Munich Security Conference in 2012

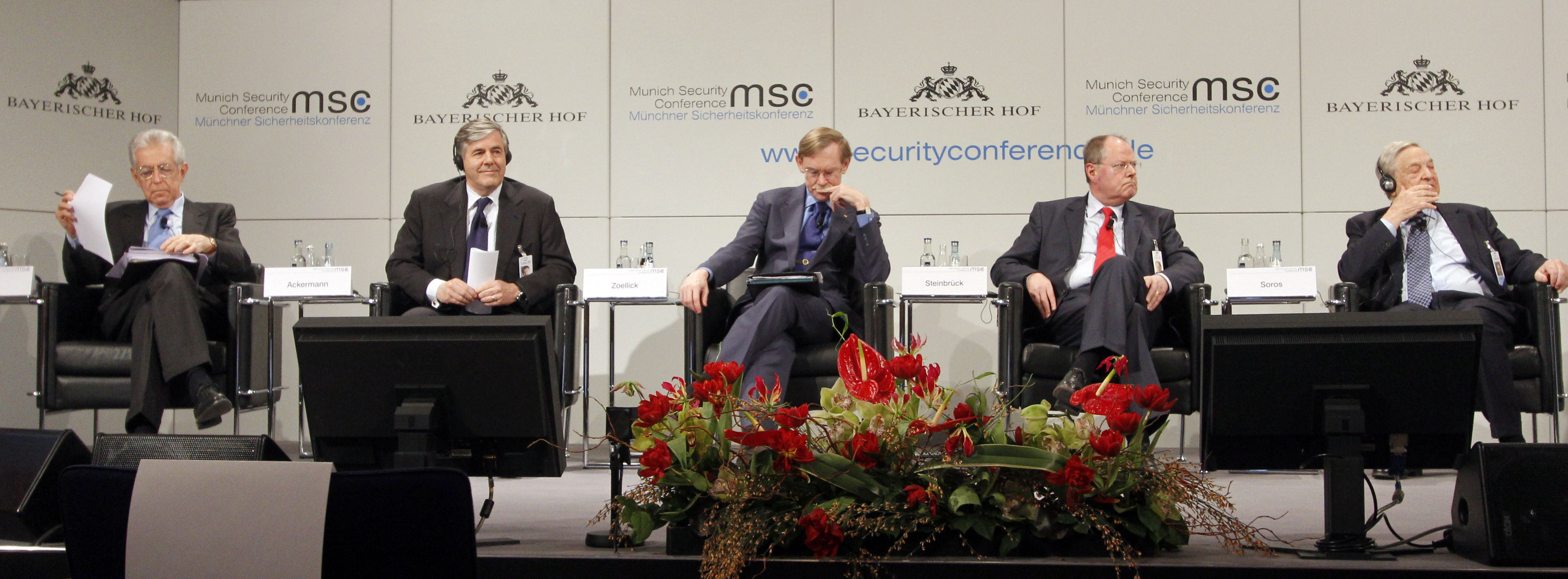
From left to right: Mario Monti, Josef Ackermann, Robert B. Zoellick, Peer Steinbrück, George Soros

The 48th Munich Security Conference was held from 2 to 5 February 2012.

=== 2013 ===
The 49th Munich Security Conference was held from 1 to 3 February 2013. The conference focused on the European debt crisis, transatlantic relations, the crisis regions of Mali and the Middle East, as well as energy security and cyber terrorism.

=== 2014 ===
The 50th Munich Security Conference was held from 31 January to 2 February 2014. The conference focused on Euromaidan, new security risks, loss of importance for Europe, the NSA spying affair and political normalization in former Yugoslavia, as well as the Middle east, and Iran's nuclear program.

=== 2015 ===
The 51st Munich Security Conference was held from 6 to 8 February 2015. Among the more than 400 international participants from nearly 80 countries were also 20 heads of state, 70 foreign and defense ministers and 30 CEOs of large companies. The conferences focused on the Russo-Ukrainian War, nuclear negotiations with Iran and the war on terror as well as the global refugees crisis.

=== 2016 ===
The 52nd Munich Security Conference took place from 12 to 14 February 2016. 600 international guests attended the event, including 30 heads of state, 70 foreign and defense ministers, directors of various intelligence agencies and 700 journalists from 48 countries. The conferences focused on the conflict between NATO and the Russian Federation, Syria and the fight against ISIS, the situation in the Middle East, the future of NATO, the North Korean nuclear program, intelligence services, the 2016 Ewald von Kleist Award, the situation in Africa as well as the ongoing refugee crisis.

=== 2017 ===
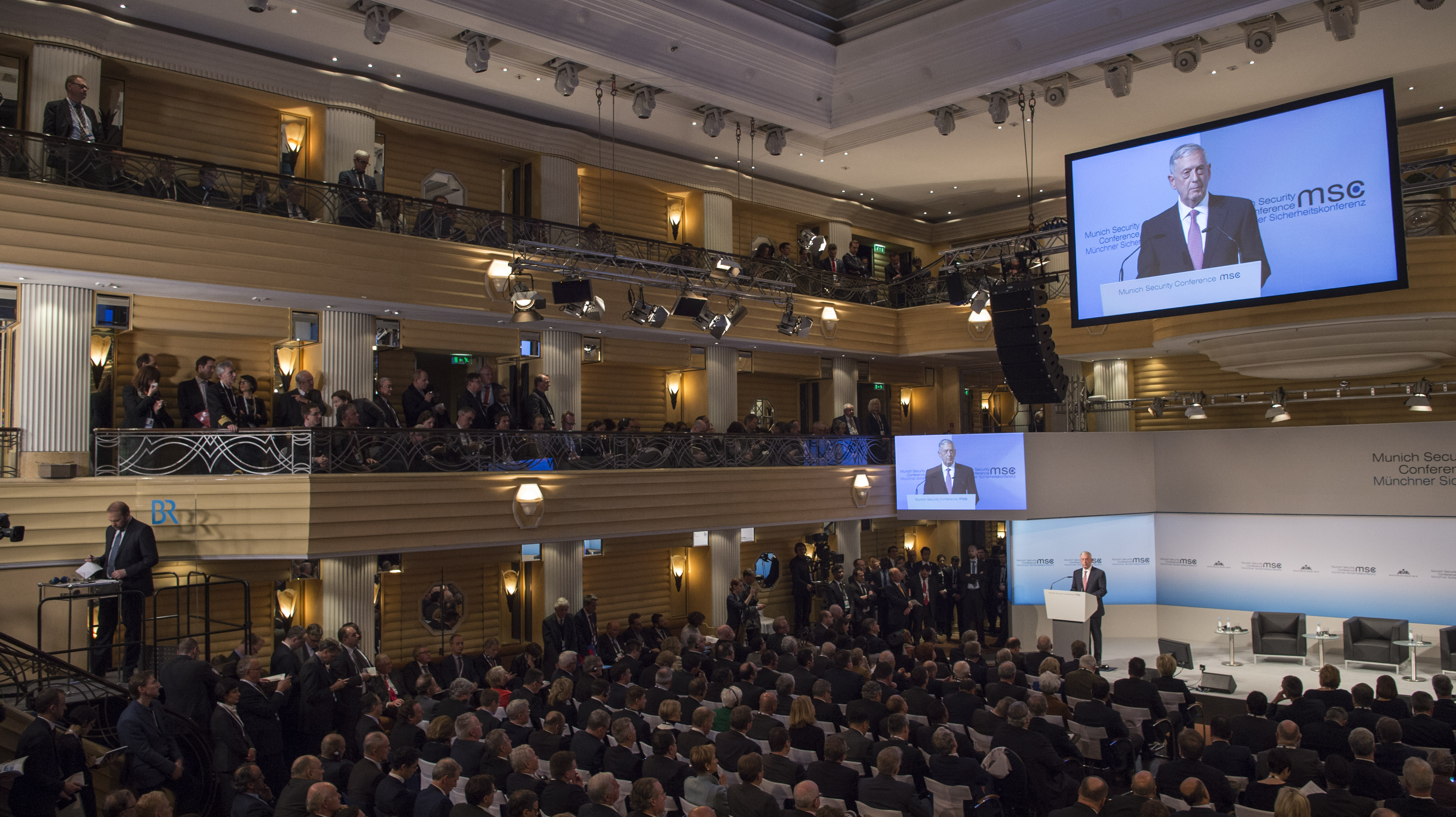
53rd Munich Security Conference 2017

The 53rd Munich Security Conference (MSC 2017) took place from 17 to 19 February 2017 at Hotel Bayerischer Hof in Munich. With a total of 680 participants, including 30 heads of state and government, nearly 60 representatives of international organizations and 65 top business leaders, it was the largest conference to date. Prominent guests and speakers were UN Secretary General António Guterres, U.S. Vice President Mike Pence, US Secretary of Defense James Mattis, Russian Foreign Minister Sergey Lavrov, Federica Mogherini, Donald Tusk and Chinese Foreign Minister Wang Yi. 700 journalists were also accredited for the event. In addition to the main events of the security conference, there were 1,350 bilateral meetings among MSC participants and delegations. The conferences focused on the future of the EU, NATO and the West, China's foreign policy, global health risks, the fight against terrorism, the Middle East and Iran as well as the US foreign policy towards Russia.

=== 2018 ===
The 54th Munich Security Conference (MSC 2018) took place from 16 to 18 February 2018 at the Hotel Bayerischer Hof in Munich.

=== 2019 ===
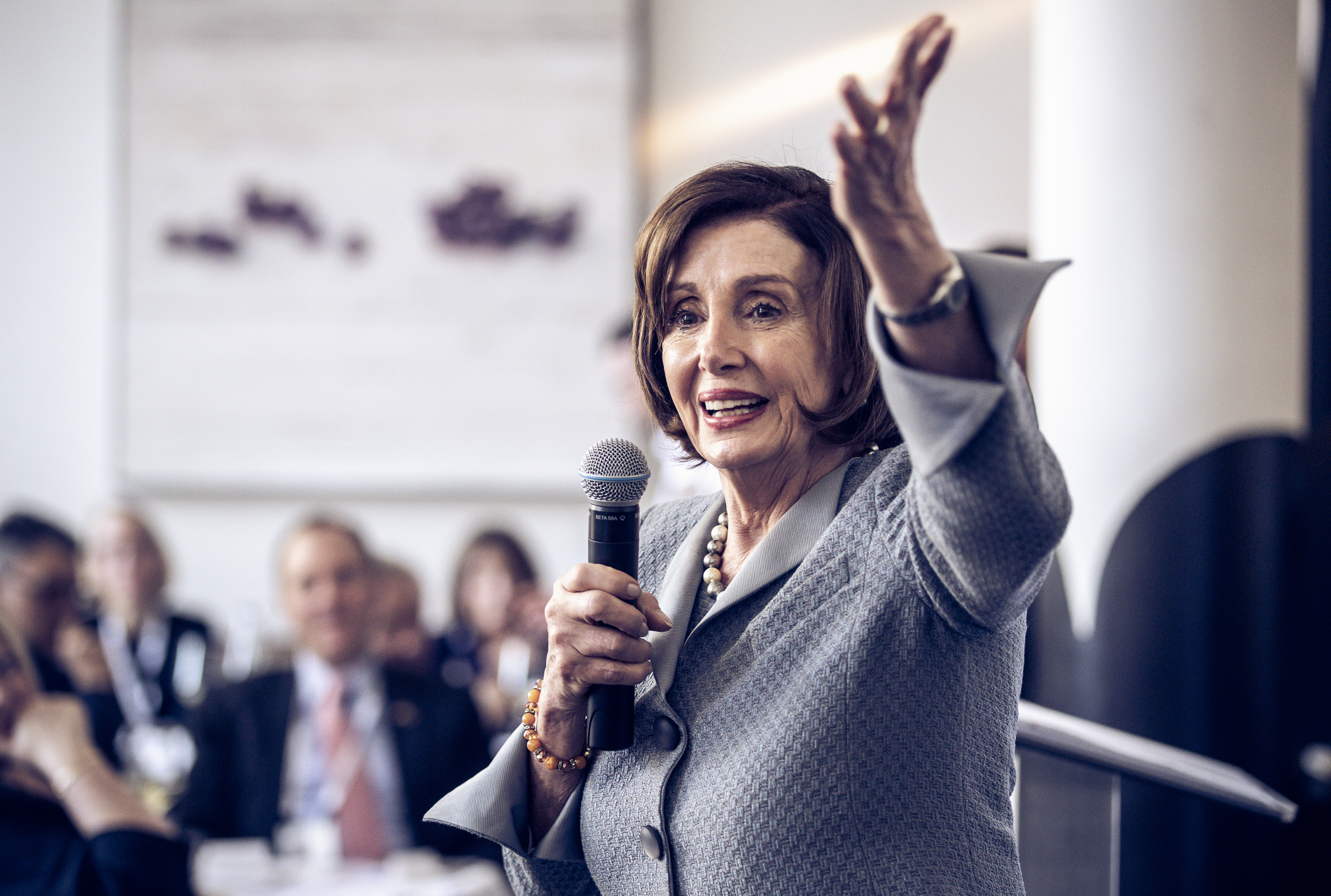
Nancy Pelosi speaking at a side event hosted by the Nuclear Threat Initiative at the 56th Munich Security Conference

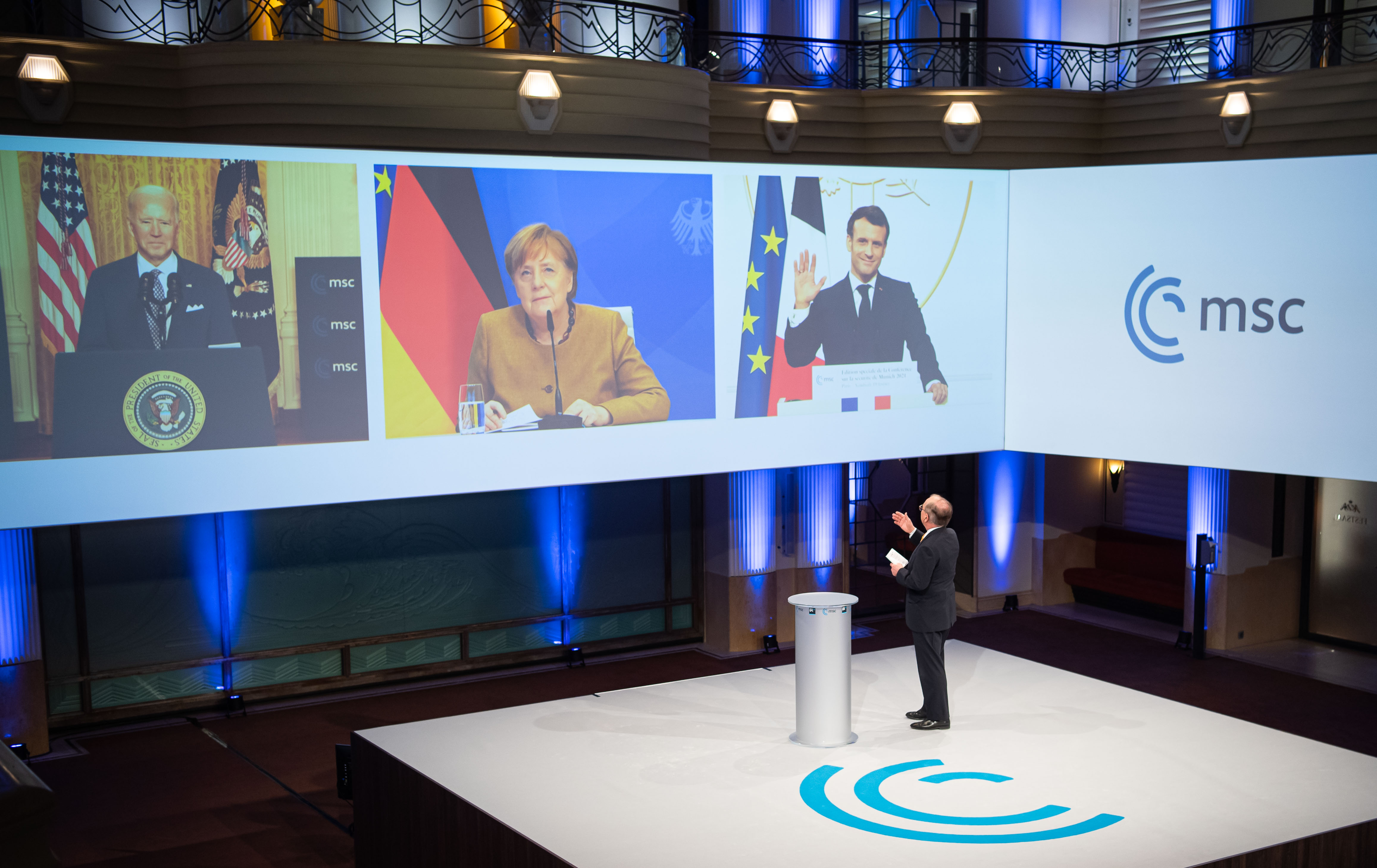
Joe Biden, Angela Merkel and Emmanuel Macron just before delivering their remarks at the Munich Special Edition 2021

The 55th Munich Security Conference (MSC 2019) took place from 15 to 17 February 2019 at the Hotel Bayerischer Hof in Munich. Among the 600 participants were heads of state and government from more than 35 countries, 50 foreign and 30 defence ministers, other representatives from the fields of politics, the military, the arms industry, business and science, as well as members of international intergovernmental and civil society organizations.

=== 2020 ===
The 56th Munich Security Conference (MSC 2020) took place from 14 to 16 February 2020 at the Hotel Bayerischer Hof in Munich. Among the more than 500 participants were heads of state and government from 35 countries. Joe Biden, later the 46th President of the United States, committed himself to a new tone from Washington on the political world stage and regarding multilateralism. He promised: "We will be back."

=== 2021 ===
The 57th Munich Security Conference ("Munich Special Edition 2021") took place on 19 February in the form of a virtual online conference, without in-person attendance, due to the ongoing COVID-19 pandemic. The event was addressed by British PM Boris Johnson, German Chancellor Angela Merkel, French President Emmanuel Macron and US President Joe Biden, who declared that "America is back".

=== 2022 ===
The 58th MSC took place from 18 to 20 February 2022. The motto was "Turning the Tide – Unlearning Helplessness". It was attended by over 30 Heads of State, 100 ministers and the heads of many of the most important international organizations like NATO, the EU and the UN. This conference was held on a smaller scale than usual due to the COVID-19 pandemic and was largely dominated by talks about the escalation in the Russo-Ukrainian war. UN Secretary-General Antonio Guterres notably said that the world was in a more precarious security situation than during the Cold War. U.S. Vice President Kamala Harris also said that the US was ready to hit Moscow with tough sanctions in the event of an attack. Russia was not present at the conference, while Ukrainian President Volodymyr Zelenskyy warned Western nations that they should abandon their policy of appeasement toward Moscow, and foreshadowed the Russian onslaught which was to occur only five days later: "To really help Ukraine, it is not necessary to constantly talk only about the dates of the probable invasion... Ukraine has been granted security assurances (with the 1994 Budapest Memorandum on Security Assurances) in exchange for giving up the world's third-largest nuclear arsenal. We don't have any firearms. And there's no security."

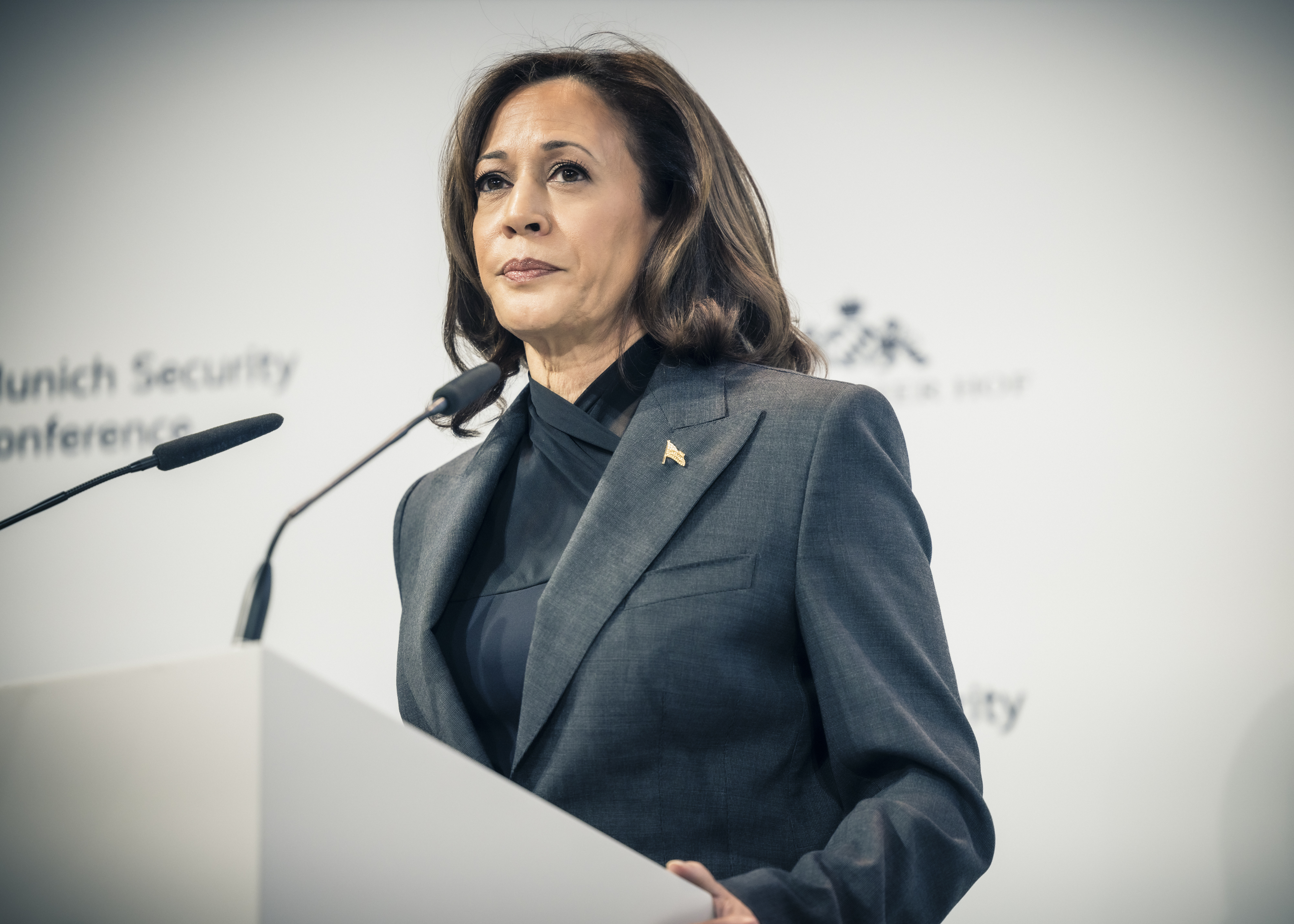
Kamala D. Harris (vice president, United States) giving her speech at the Conversation, "The US in the World", on the Main Stage of the 59th Munich Security Conference in 2023

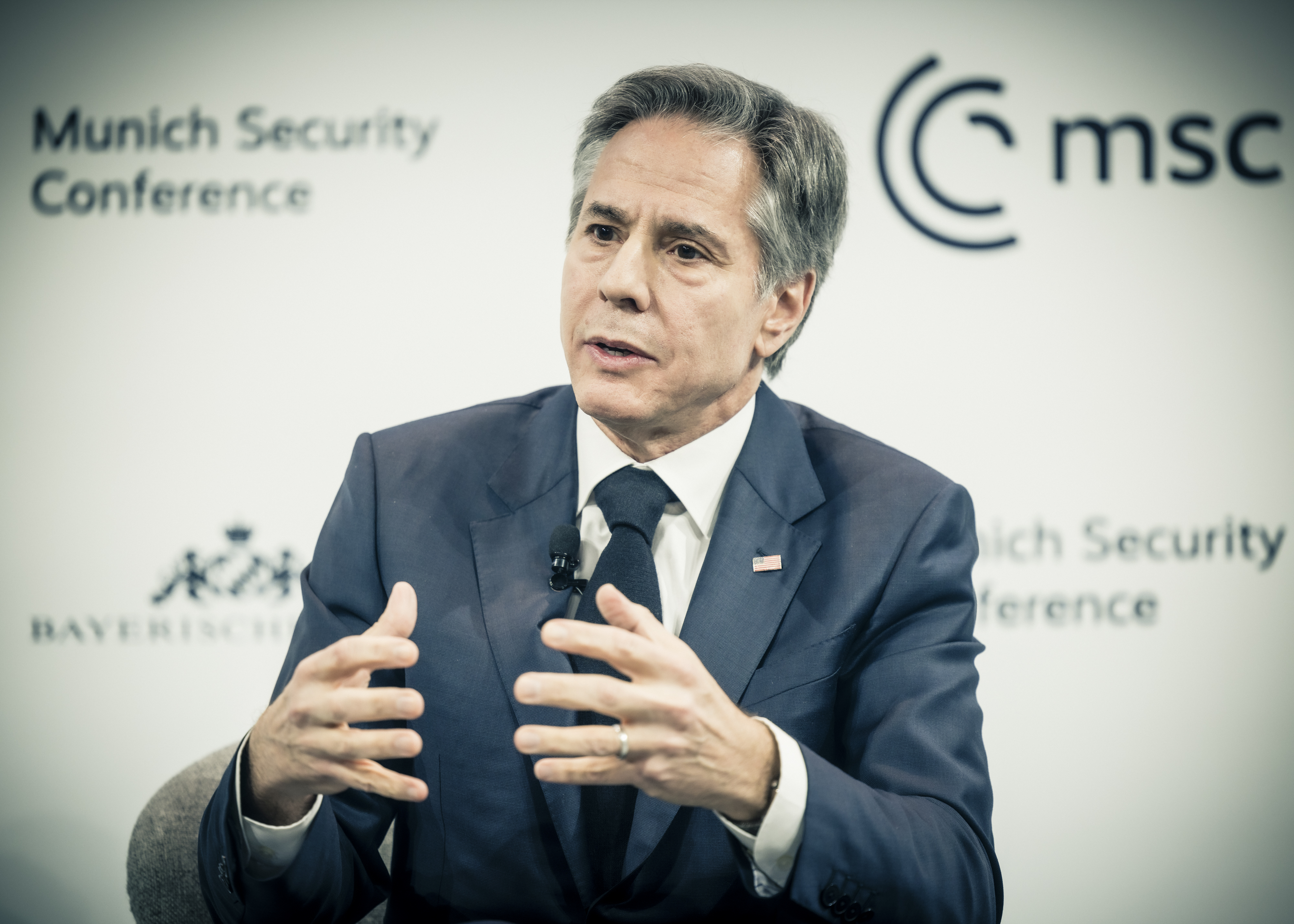
Antony Blinken (Secretary of State, United States of America) attending the Panel Discussion "Whole, Free, and at Peace: Visions for Ukraine" on the Main Stage of the 59th Munich Security Conference in 2023

=== 2023 ===
The 59th MSC took place from 17 to 19 February 2023. The overarching motto was "Re:Vision," which is also the title of the Munich Security Conference report that has been published in preparation for the conference. On the one hand, the debates focused on the increased efforts of autocratic states to revise the international order. On the other hand, the conference called for new common visions for the international order and possible cooperation despite geopolitical challenges. Representatives from all over the world participated, among them: Kamala Harris, Antony Blinken, Rishi Sunak, Emmanuel Macron, Olaf Scholz, Annalena Baerbock, Boris Pistorius, Ursula von der Leyen, Jens Stoltenberg, Wang Yi, Andrzej Duda, Francia Márquez, Kaja Kallas, Nana Akufo-Addo and Volodymyr Zelenskyy (virtually). The Russian invasion of Ukraine and its impact was at the center of most discussions in Munich. In addition, a wide range of security policy issues were discussed. A major concern of the new MSC chairman, Christoph Heusgen, was to include the so-called Global South more into the conference in order to discuss and enable global visions. The first panel discussion on Saturday morning was dedicated to this topic. Other cross-cutting issues were climate change, food insecurity and energy security, as well as regional and country-specific topics, including Iran, the Horn of Africa and Russia.

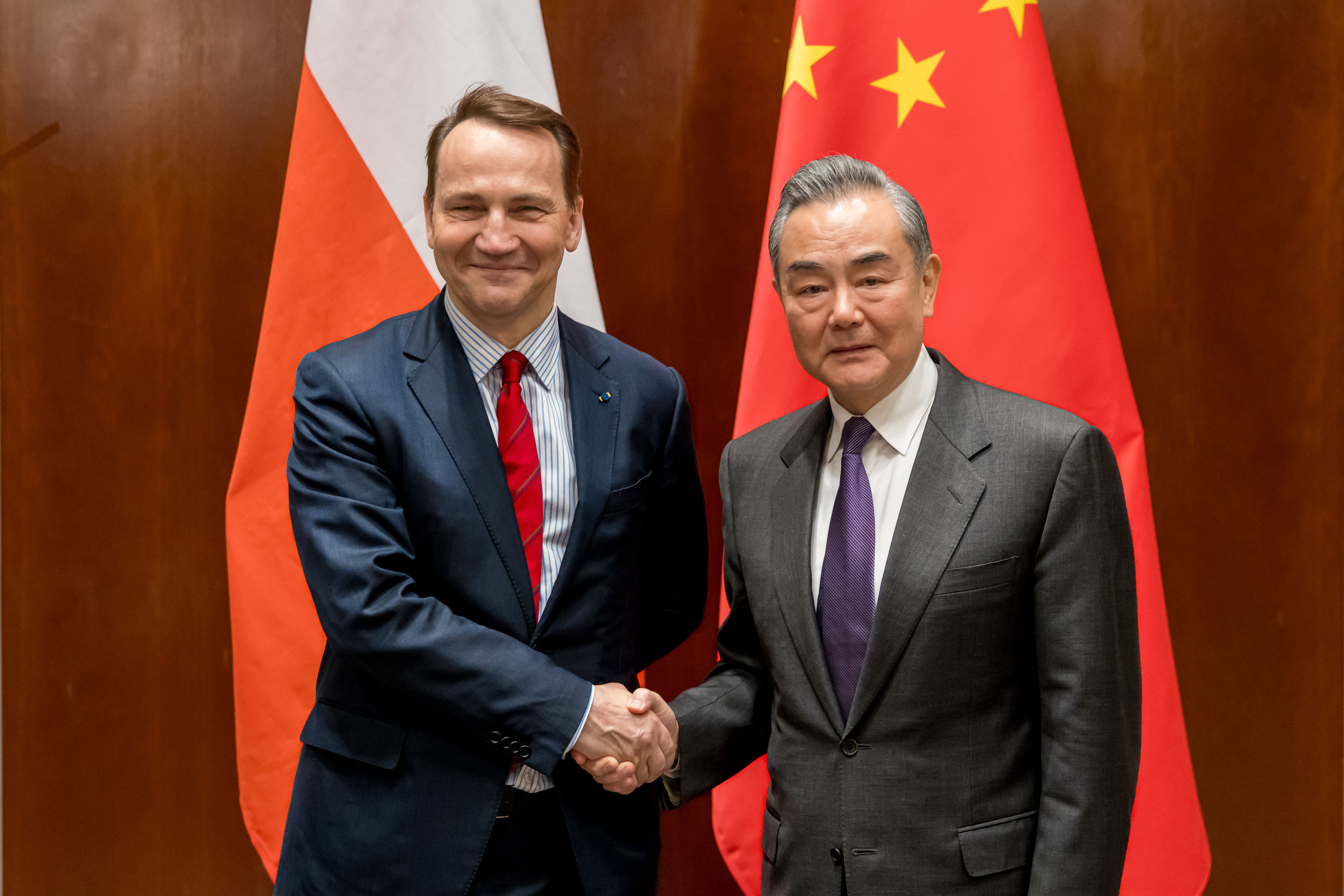
Polish Foreign Minister Radosław Sikorski with Chinese Foreign Minister Wang Yi at the 60th Munich Security Conference in 2024

Notably, at the 2023 Munich Security Conference, billionaire investor George Soros commented that the financial troubles of the Adani Group could weaken Prime Minister Narendra Modi's hold on India's government, potentially paving the way for institutional reforms. This statement provoked a strong response from India's BJP, which accused Soros of attempting to undermine India's democracy.

=== 2024 ===
The 60th Munich Security Conference took place from 16 to 18 February 2024. The motto "Lose-Lose?", title of the according Munich Security Report, also referred as central theme to the conference: The need to reshape the global order for the benefit of all as an inclusive alternative to the growing "lose-lose" dynamics of isolationism. Judging by the debate in Munich, implementing reform proposals requires more political will.

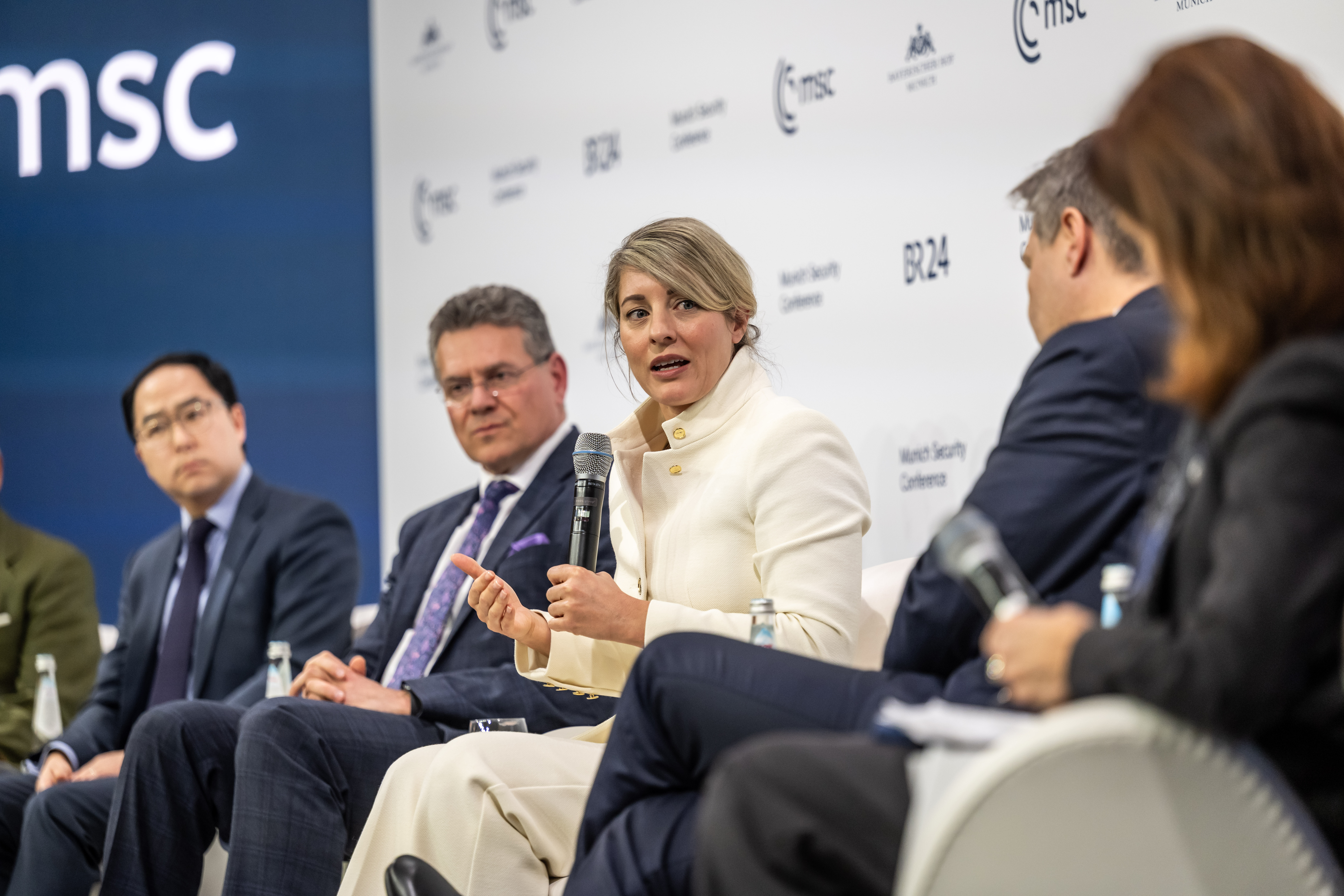
Mélanie Joly, Panel Discussion at Munich Security Conference 2025, 15 February 2025

Almost 1,000 participants from 109 countries included 45 heads of state and government. At the 60 main events, more than half of the speakers were female and over a quarter represented countries of the Global South. Over 200 side events were hosted by public and private organizations.

Israeli President Isaac Herzog and Foreign Minister Israel Katz attended the Munich Conference in the midst of the ongoing Gaza war.

=== 2025 ===
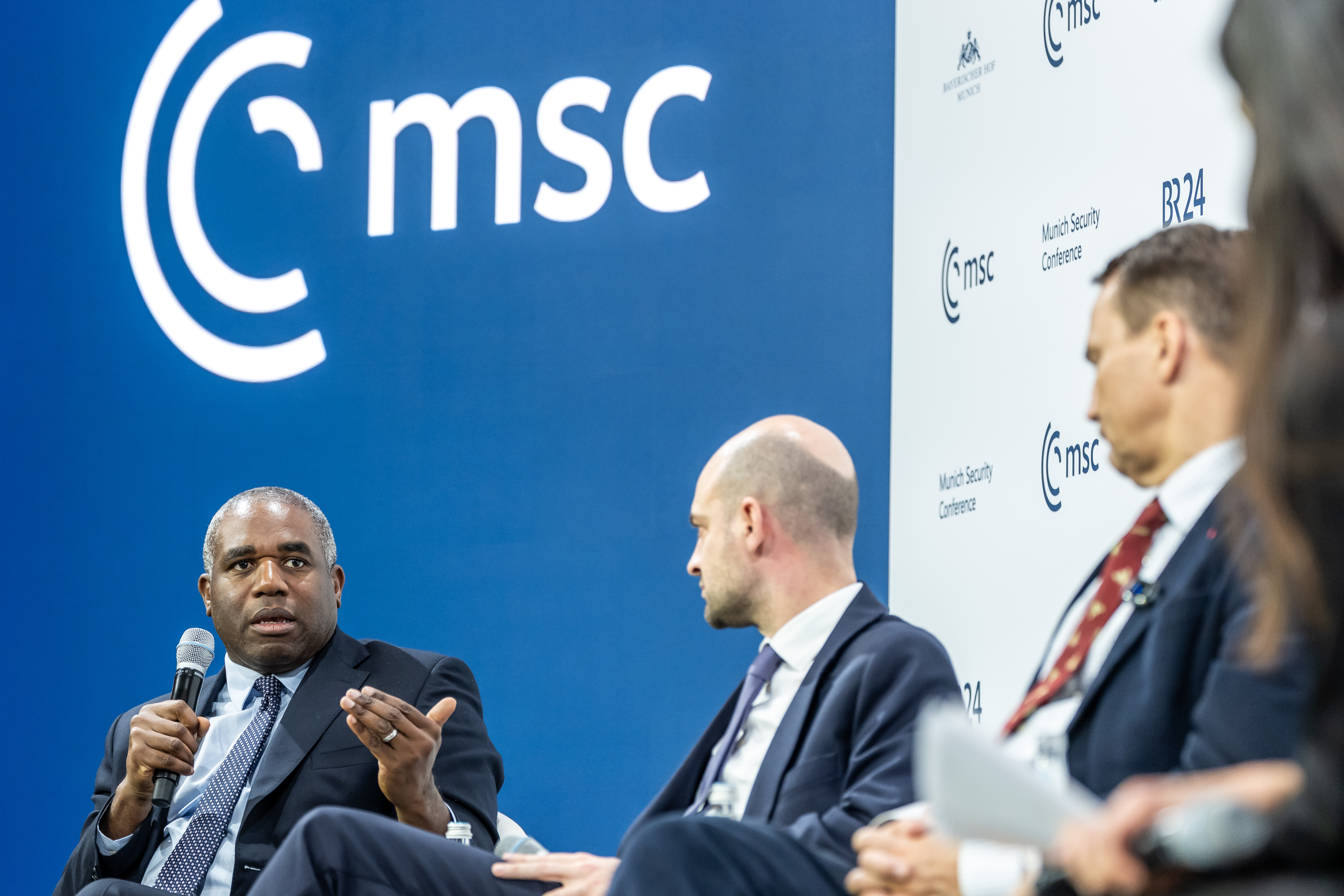
David Lammy, Panel Discussion at Munich Security Conference 2025, 15 February 2025

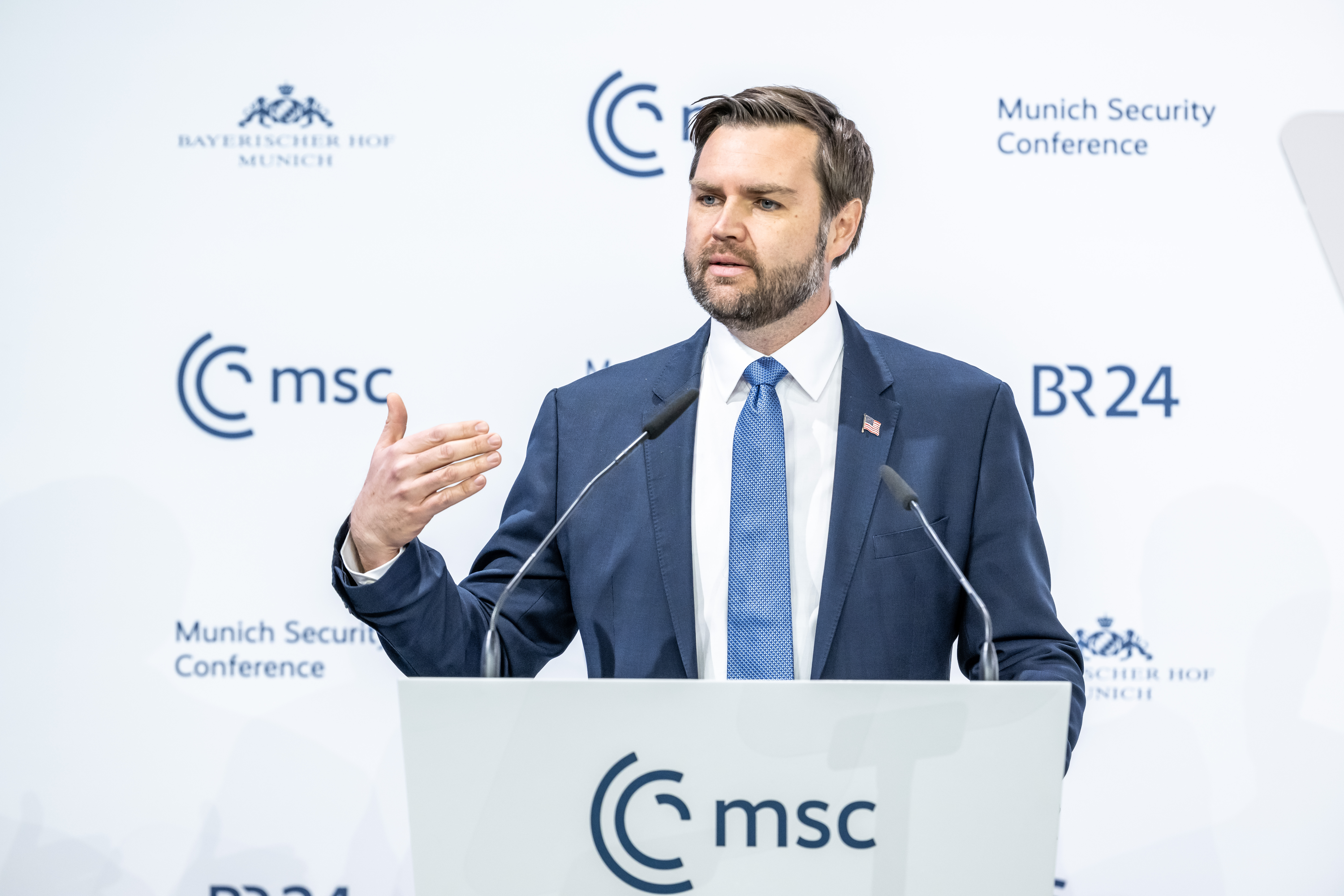
J.D. Vance during his speech at the Munich Security Conference 2025, 14 February 2025

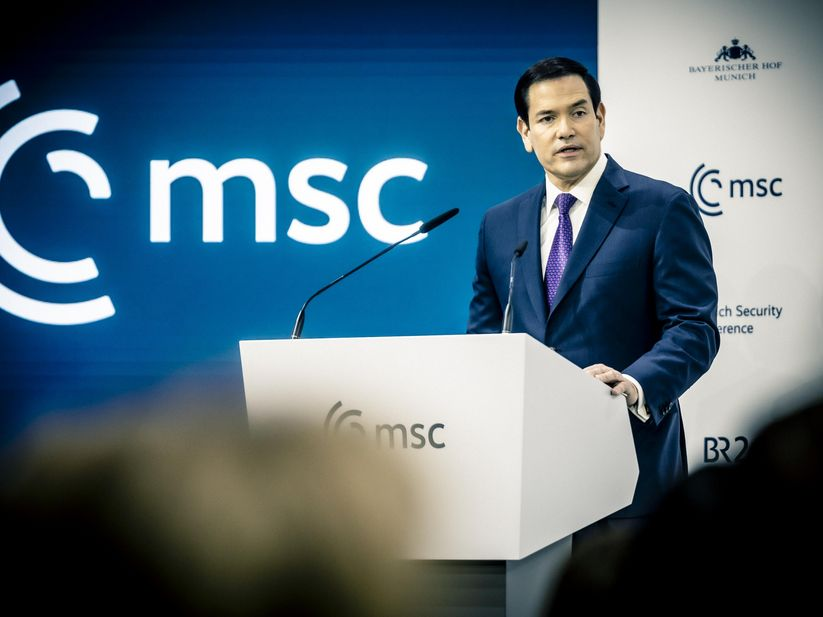
Marco Rubio, Secretary of State, United States of America at the 62nd Munich Security Conference, 14 February 2026

The 61st Munich Security Conference took place from 14 to 16 February 2025. Based on the Munich Security Report 2025 published in advance, the conference's motto was "Multipolarization" – summing up the current global changes and challenges. A series of U.S. statements at the conference sparked controversy and unrest among the attending European politicians.

U.S. Vice President JD Vance criticised the organisers of the Munich Security Conference for having "banned lawmakers representing populist parties on both the left and the right from participating in these conversations" in a speech at the conference, adding that "we don't have to agree with everything or anything that people say. But when political leaders represent an important constituency, it is incumbent upon us to at least participate in dialogue with them". His remarks that free speech in Europe was "in retreat" faced pushback from some European officials, such as Chancellor Olaf Scholz, Opposition Leader and future Chancellor Friedrich Merz, Vice Chancellor Robert Habeck, and Minister for Foreign Annalena Baerbock, collectively representing three political parties. Marie-Agnes Strack-Zimmermann of the centre-right Free Democratic Party called Vance's speech a "bizarre intellectual bottom".

Key conclusions from the conference included the need for NATO's European members to significantly increase their defense spending and take on the primary responsibility for military funding for Ukraine, rather than relying on the U.S. Additionally, the U.S. and Russia aim to negotiate a deal to end the war in Ukraine.

=== 2026 ===
Under the motto of the 2026 Munich Security Report, "Under Destruction", the 62nd Munich Security Conference took place from 13 to 15 February 2026. The topics discussed included global security policy, the war in Ukraine, transatlantic relations, cutting-edge technology, the future of artificial intelligence, as well as energy supply and climate security.

Considerable attention was given to the opening speech by German Chancellor Friedrich Merz, who distanced himself from the United States. The speech by US Secretary of State Marco Rubio also attracted widespread attention and stood in contrast to US Vice President JD Vance's disruptive address a year earlier. Rubio emphasized the historical and cultural ties between the United States and Europe, prompting a standing ovation.

=== 2027 ===
The 63rd Munich Security Conference is scheduled to take place from 12 to 14 February 2027.

== Events ==
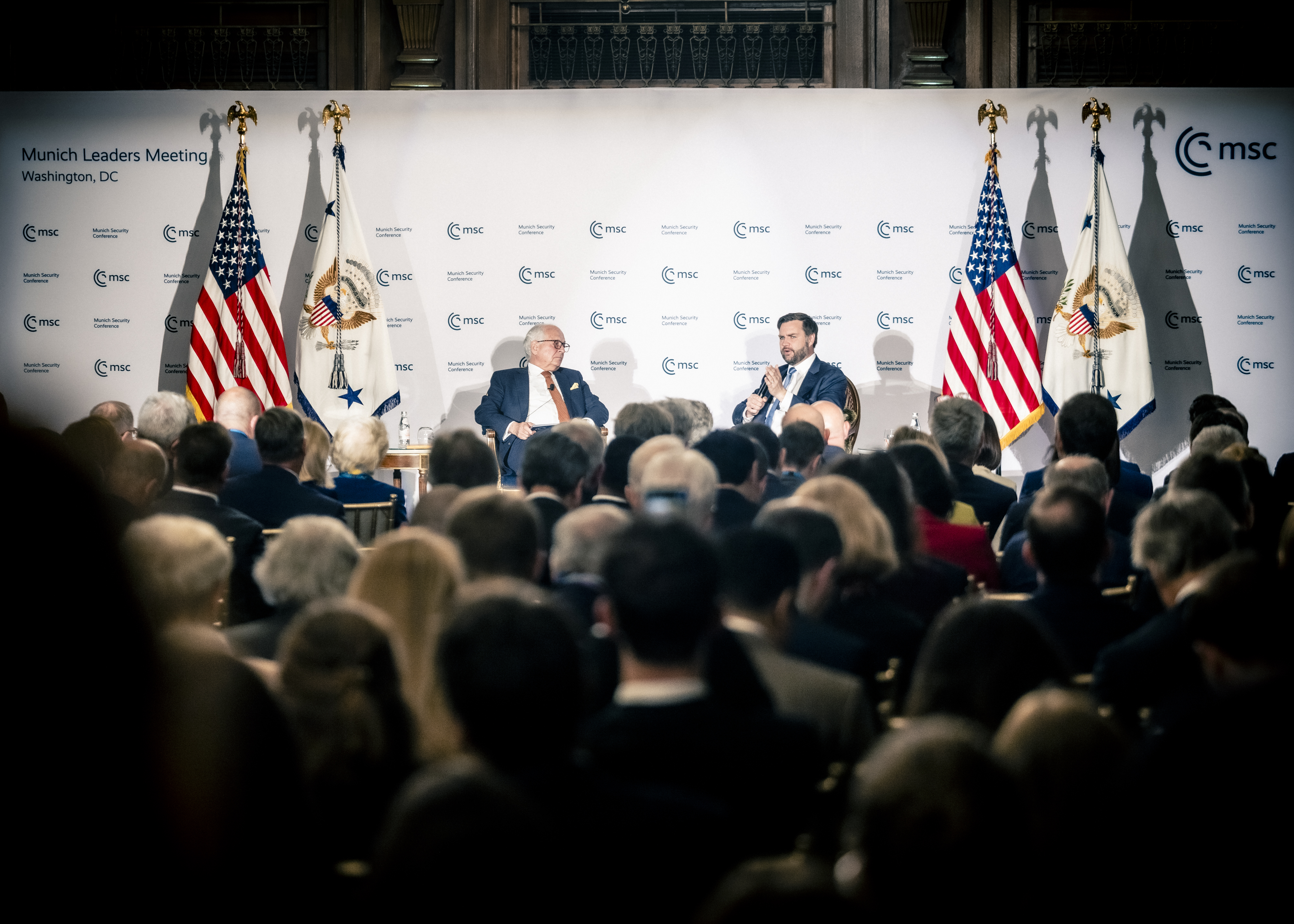
US Vice President JD Vance, participating in a Q&A session with Wolfgang Ischinger, president of the MSC Foundation Council, at the Munich Leaders Meeting in Washington, DC, 7 May 2025

In addition to the main conference in February, the Munich Security Conference hosts a variety of events and networks.

=== Munich Leaders Meetings ===
In addition to the main conference, a series of events, the MSC Munich Leaders Meetings (previously Core Group Meetings), were launched in November 2009 in Washington, DC. The meetings provide a select group of participants the opportunity to discuss key issues of international security policy in order to continue the work of the Security Conference and provide impulses. The location of the Core Group Meetings always varies.

=== Munich Strategy Retreats ===
A select group of 30-50 experts, leaders and thinkers who come together in a private setting to develop recommendations on the latest security challenges.

=== Roundtables ===
Regular roundtable events take place with varying numbers of participants, both as part of international meetings and events and as independent events, including the European Defense Roundtable series (EDR), launched in 2026. Several roundtables can be organized in the form of a "summit" and individual "conversations" can also be held in virtual form. The thematic focus ranges from European defense policy to cyber security and human security issues.

=== European Defense Townhall ===
As a public event series, the European Defense Townhall (EDT) promotes direct dialogue between citizens and stakeholders in European security and defense policy in cities across Europe.

== Awards and networks ==
Awards and support programs initiated by the MSC.

=== Ewald von Kleist Award ===
Since 2009, the award has been given to individuals who made a special contribution to peace and conflict resolution. The laureates receive a medal with the inscription "Peace through Dialogue", as John McCain (2018), Alexis Tsipras and Zoran Zaev (2019), the United Nations (2020), Angela Merkel (2021), Jens Stoltenberg (2022), Finland and Sweden (2023), Mia Amor Mottley and John F. Kerry (2024), Kaja Kallas (2025), the Ukrainian People (2026).

=== John McCain Dissertation Award ===
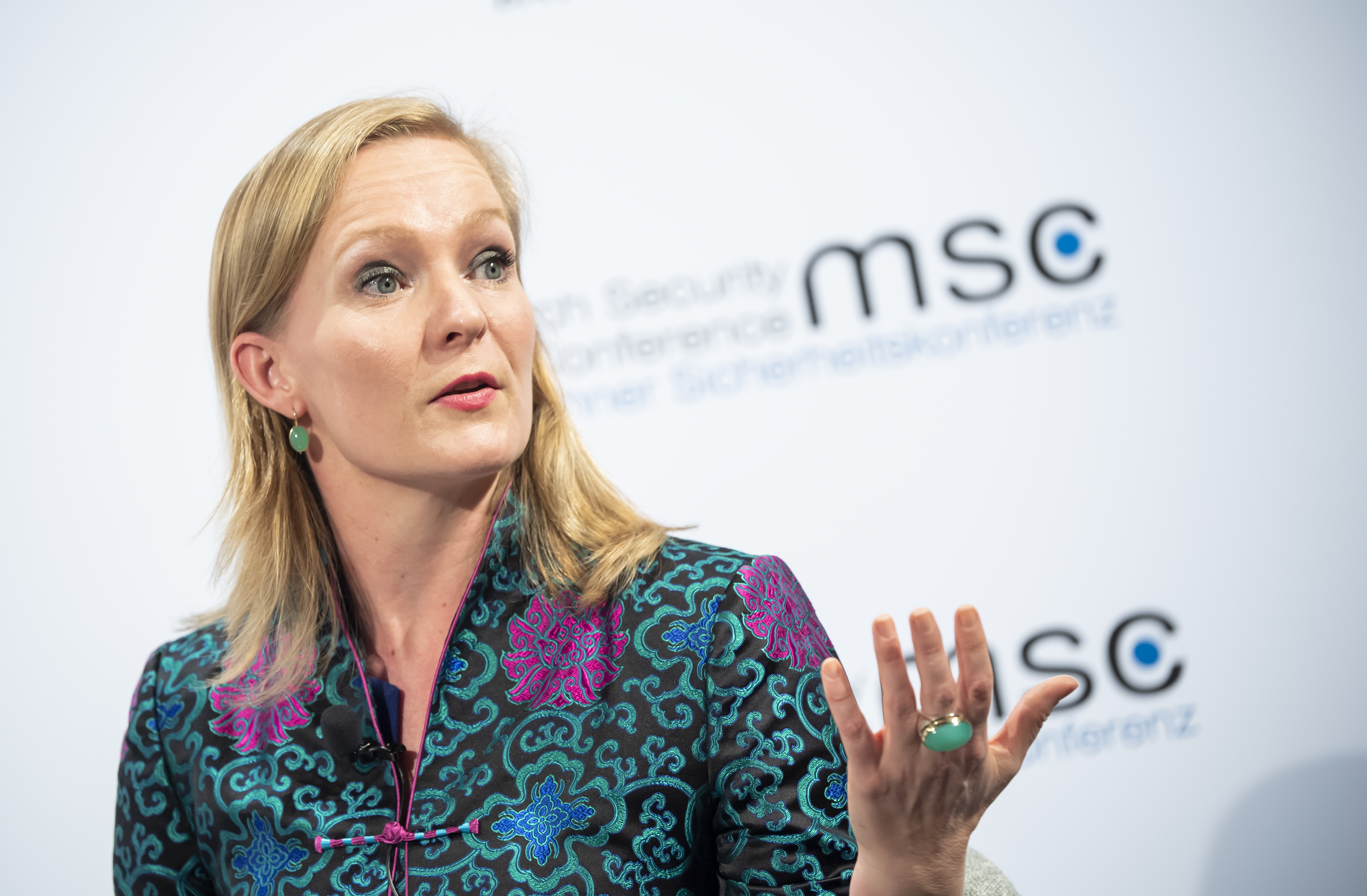
Munich Young Leader Marietje Schaake speaks on a panel discussion at the 56th Munich Security Conference.

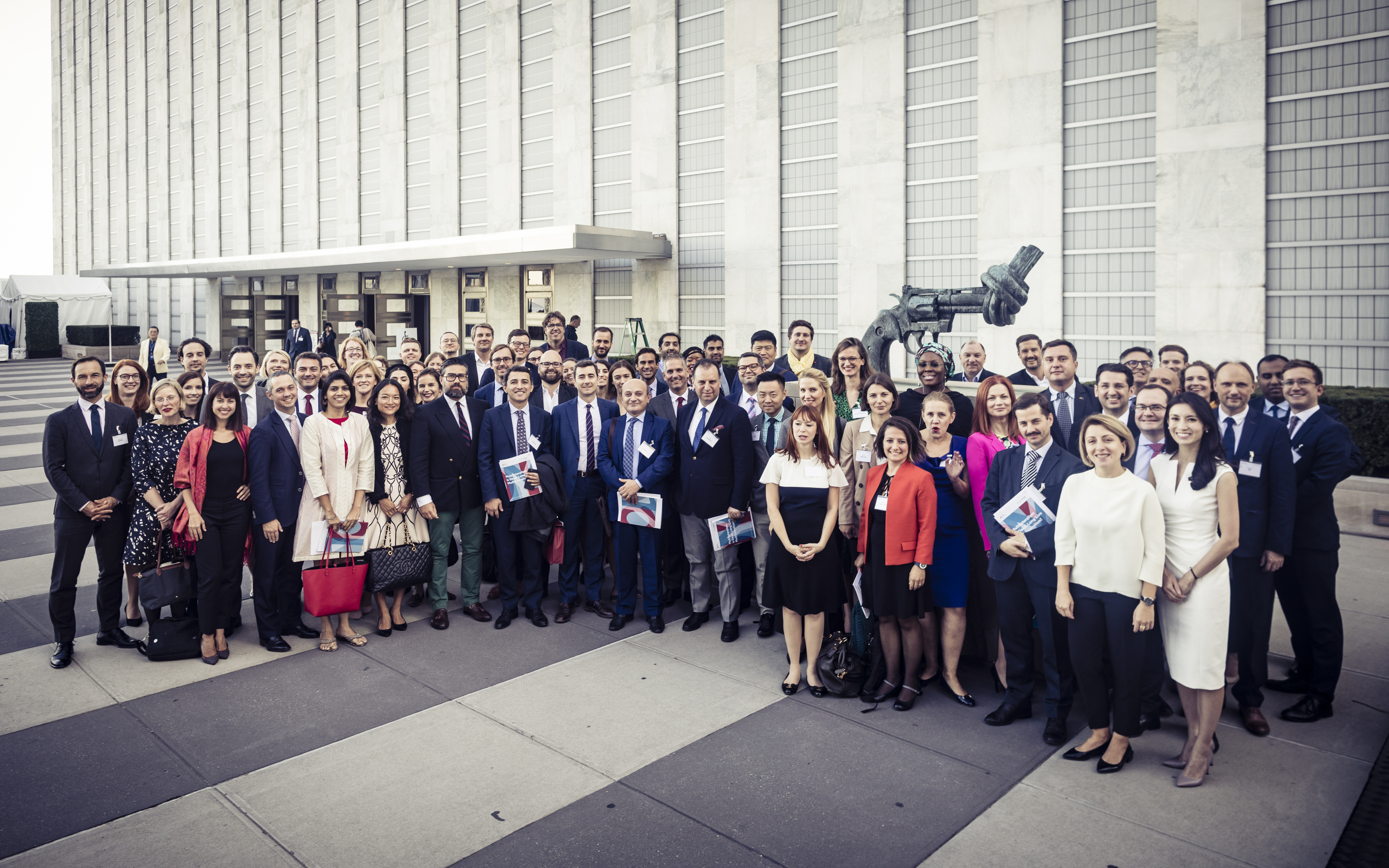
Munich Young Leaders in New York City, 2019

Beginning in 2019, and alongside the conferences, up to two political science dissertations are being honored that focus on transatlantic relations. The award is given in memory of John McCain together with the partners Munich School of Public Policy, Geschwister-Scholl-Institut, University of the Federal Armed Forces, and the McCain Institute. Among other things, the award grants participation in MSC events and a prize money of up to 10,000 Euros.

=== MSC Women Parliamentarians Program ===
Starting with the Munich Security Conference 2023, the Women Parliamentarians Program aims to establish a network to connect the new generation of female decision-makers worldwide. A select group of cross-party elected officials engages in a variety of formats throughout the course of a year in order to generate new ideas in foreign, security, and development policy.

=== Munich Young Leaders ===
In 2009, the Munich Young Leaders was first launched in cooperation with the Körber Foundation. Held in parallel to the Security Conference, this annual roundtable series is designed to directly involve the next generation of decision-makers into the main conference proceedings. The Roundtable agendas as well as the participants and speakers lists are published online.

== Publications ==
Often in collaboration with partner organizations, regular security policy publications report, comment and inform on current events, debates and developments: Munich Security Briefs and Debriefs, Munich Security Analyses, Munich Security Opinions as well as special editions and books. Key publications are the annual Munich Security Report (MSR), the Munich Security Index (MSI), and the Selected Key Speeches series.

=== Munich Security Report (MSR) ===
The Munich Security Report is published annually in the run-up to the Munich Security Conference. It contains data, analyses and graphics on current security policy developments and serves as the basis for discussions at the main conference in February.The 2026 Munich Security Report is titled Under Destruction while the focus of 2025 was Multipolarization.

=== Munich Security Index (MSI) ===
Since 2021, the Munich Security Index has been an integral part of the Munich Security Report. The index analyses the security policy risk perceptions of the G7 and BRICS or B(R)ICS countries, as well as selected other countries.

=== Selected Key Speeches series ===
As part of the Selected Key Speeches series, the Munich Security Conference has published four volumes to date: Selected Key Speeches 1963 –2024, Speech by JD Vance and Selected Reactions, Speech by Russian President Vladimir and Selected Reactions and Speeches by John McCain and Selected Reflections. The series documents key speeches delivered at the Munich Security Conference. Further editions are planned.

== Former events ==
Some events and distinct formats have transformed, evolved and/or changed names and purposes in the course of time.

=== Security Innovation Board ===
In 2021, the MSC Security Innovation Board was launched, bringing together a group of experts from the technology and defense policy sectors to promote exchange on innovation in the security policy field.

=== Zeitenwende on tour ===
A discussion format for the exchange of views on security policy between citizens and representatives from politics, academia, and society, supplemented by the Zeitenwende podcast.

=== Core Group Meetings ===
After the launch in 2009, the subsequent events took place in Moscow in 2010, Beijing in 2011, as well as Doha in 2013. A second meeting was held for the first time in 2013 in Washington, DC. The location of the 2014 Core Group Meeting was New Delhi. The issues discussed in New Delhi were the threats of terrorism and cyber-attacks, questions of maritime security, regional and global security structures and concepts for new global governance. The Core Group Meeting 2015 was held in Vienna. The Russo-Ukrainian war was a central theme of the meeting, which featured the Ukrainian Foreign Minister Pavlo Klimkin and the Russian deputy Foreign Minister Alexei Meshkov. Klimkin urged the European states to confront the Russian government head-on. The Austrian Foreign Minister Sebastian Kurz stated that any border changes in Europe were "unacceptable", but at the same time stressed the need for cooperation with Russia. While the Swiss Foreign Minister Didier Burkhalter proposed a neutral status for Ukraine, the Serbian Foreign Minister Ivica Dačić as OSCE chairman called for a strengthening of his organization in order to prevent future conflicts.

Another Core Group Meeting took place in Tehran in October 2015. Key topics of the meeting were the implementation of the Vienna Agreement concerning the Iranian nuclear program and the political situation in the region. German Foreign Minister Steinmeier, who opened the conference together with the Iranian Foreign Minister Zarif, emphasized the importance of transparency and trust for the successful implementation of the Vienna agreement: "After the game is before the game".

In April 2016, another MSC Core Group Meeting took place in the Ethiopian capital Addis Ababa. The security situation in Africa, the fight against international terrorism, and the challenges posed by climate change and epidemics were central themes of the meeting. The Ethiopian Foreign Minister Tedros Adhanom Ghebreyesus stressed the mutual global interdependencies in all of these issues. Other participants included Ethiopian Prime Minister Hailemariam Desalegn, former Nigerian President Olusegun Obasanjo, Smaїl Chergui, African Union Commissioner, former UN Secretary-General Kofi Annan and former German President Horst Köhler.

Another Core Group Meeting was held in Beijing in November 2016. Key topics of the meeting were China's role in the international order, conflicts in the Asia-Pacific region and the geopolitical importance of the "New Silk Road". Deputy Chinese Foreign Minister, Zhang Yesui, stressed in his opening speech the importance of dialogue and cooperation for the security of the region. During the core group meeting, Chinese Vice President Li Yuanchao, reaffirmed his country's willingness to contribute to peace and security globally. Other participants included Fu Ying, chairwoman of the National People's Congress Foreign Affairs Committee, Louise Mushikiwabo, Rwandan Minister of Foreign Affairs, Markus Ederer, secretary of state at the German Foreign Office, Tom Enders, CEO of Airbus Group, and several members of the Bundestag.

=== Cyber Security Summit ===
In 2012, the first Cyber Security Summit was held in cooperation with Deutsche Telekom in Bonn. The first event was conducted under Chatham House Rule. According to media reports, the supervisory board chairman of Deutsche Bank, Paul Achleitner, the head of the construction group Bilfinger Berger, Roland Koch, as well as Peter Terium, the CEO of the energy supplier RWE and Johannes Teyssen of E.ON were in attendance.

During the summit several working groups analyzed existing cyber risks and dangers for energy, finances, health, logistics, media, and production.

On 11 November 2013 the second summit took place in Bonn. The gathering had the following four topics:

- Rebuilding trust in the digital society
- New threat scenarios for the economy
- Gaining trust, restoring trust
- Cyber defense is becoming a business-critical core skill.

Unlike in 2012, the list of speakers was published:

- Neelie Kroes, vice-president (Digital Company) of the European Commission
- Sabine Leutheusser-Schnarrenberger, German Federal Minister of Justice
- Johanna Mikl-Leitner, Interior Minister of Austria
- Ambassador Wolfgang Ischinger, chairman of the Munich Security Conference Foundation gGmbH; executive vice president for Government Relations at Allianz
- Ehud Barak, former prime minister of Israel
- Jürgen Stock, vice-president of the German Federal Criminal Police
- Scott Charney, vice president of Microsoft
- Arthur W. Coviello Jr., CEO of RSA Security
- Thomas Rid, lecturer at King's College London; author on issues of cyber security
- René Obermann, CEO of Deutsche Telekom; vice president of BITKOM e.V.
- Timotheus Höttges, chief financial and controlling officer of Deutsche Telekom AG; designated CEO
- Thomas Kremer, director of Privacy, Legal Affairs and Compliance at Deutsche Telekom AG
- Klaus Schweinsberg, former editor of the business magazines Capital and Impulse; founder and director of the Center for Strategy and senior management

The third summit was held on 3 November 2014. It was attended by 180 representatives from the fields of politics, economy, EU and NATO. In his opening speech, Telekom CEO Höttges highlighted the growing number of attacks on data and digital infrastructures, where the Telekom network recorded 1 Million attacks daily. He quoted a CSIS study that estimated the global damage caused by cybercrime to be US$575 billion per year. To protect European data against access by US authorities, Höttges called for a revision of the Safe Harbor Agreement. The intelligence coordinator of the federal government, Klaus-Dieter Fritsche, supported Höttges demands.

MSC Chairman Ischinger described the great geopolitical importance of cyber security as a result of the Russo-Ukrainian war, which had marked the return of war as political means in Europe. State Secretary Brigitte Zypries stated the planned IT Security Act in which the reporting of cyber attacks on companies from sensitive sectors was an obligation as the contribution by the German Federal Government to increase data security. Andy Mueller-Maguhn, a former spokesman for the Chaos Computer Club, stressed the importance of strong encryption for data security and warned of the "back doors", like those that RSA Security installed for the NSA. Elmar Brok, chairman of the European Parliament Committee on Foreign Affairs, and Karl-Theodor zu Guttenberg urged to ward off cyber attacks with offensive actions and stressed the need for a deterrence component. Ben Wizner, representative of the American Civil Liberties Union and lawyer of Edward Snowden, contradicted against those needs. In separate working groups, the topics of Digital Defense, Cyber governance, Promotion of Innovation in regards to data security and preventive data protection were also discussed.

The fourth Cyber Security Summit was held on 19 and 20 September 2016 Palo Alto, Silicon Valley. The summit was jointly convened by MSC, Deutsche Telekom and Stanford University. 140 representatives from the fields of politics, security and business participated in the gathering. A central theme of the meeting was the 2016 U.S. presidential election and its possible manipulation by cyber attacks. The chairman of the Munich Security Conference, Wolfgang Ischinger, expressed his fear that such attacks could damage confidence in democratic elections in general.

Further topics were the defense against cyberterrorism, the future of warfare, the economic relevance of cybersecurity and the development of norms and rules for the Internet. MSC chairman Ischinger called for closer coordination between the worlds of politics and technology, in order to create the basis for an open, free and secure web.

In connection with the Internet of Things, Marc Goodman from the American Think Tank Singularity University warned that "everything could be hacked". Goodman predicted the Internet would feature an "epic battle" of different interest groups. Peter R. Neumann from King's College London described the hierarchical structure of law enforcement agencies as an organizational problem in combating cyber-crime, at odds with the de-centralized operating mode of the Internet.

Other participants included Dmitri Alperovitch, co-founder and CTO of CrowdStrike, Michael Chertoff, former United States Department of Homeland Security, chairman and founder of the Chertoff Group, Michael McFaul, director of the Freeman Spogli Institute at Stanford University and former US Ambassador in Russia, and Iddo Moed, Coordinator of Cybersecurity for the Israeli Foreign Ministry, Christopher Painter, Coordinator for Cyber Issues at the US State Department, Latha Reddy, former National Security Adviser of India and currently a member of the Global Commission on Internet Governance, as well as, Uri Rosenthal, former Dutch foreign minister and current Special Envoy of his country for cyber politics.

=== Energy Security Summit ===
Together with the Frankfurter Allgemeine Zeitung, the MSC has been organizing the Energy Security Summit since 2013. The first meeting was held on 10 July 2013 in the ballroom of the Frankfurt Palmengarten under the auspices of Federal Economics and Technology Minister Philipp Rösler and Environment Minister Peter Altmaier. Other topics of the event were climate change, the geostrategic consequences of fracking and the German Energy transition.

The second Energy Security Summit was held in Berlin on 27 and 28 May 2014. Key topics of the meeting included the "shale gas revolution" in the United States and the war in Ukraine. In his speech, Foreign Minister Steinmeier stressed the important role of energy policy for foreign and security policy. Steinmeier pushed for a European Energy Union and urged the EU countries to demonstrate unity with regard to the Russo-Ukrainian war. The minister stressed the need to make compromises in the Russia-Ukraine gas dispute, and warned against too high expectations of substituting American shale gas for Russian gas supplies. EU Energy Commissioner Günther Oettinger also spoke in favor of a European Energy Union with uniform gas prices. He also described Germany's energy policy as being in a "Romantic Valley". The strategic issue of energy would require Germany to get involved with its technological and political competence, Oettinger stated. During the meeting, Ukrainian Prime Minister Yatsenyuk described the war in Ukraine as a "global security conflict" which only Russia would be responsible for. Yatsenyuk reiterated his country's refusal to pay a "political price" in exchange for gas supplies from Russia. The premier also expressed the willingness of his country to participate in a common energy policy with the EU.

The third Energy Security Summit was held on 5 and 6 May 2015, again in Berlin. During the meeting, Iranian Oil Minister Bijan Namdar Zangeneh laid out his country's plans for the development of the energy sector after the end of sanctions. After the previously reached deal to resolve the Iranian nuclear crisis, the Minister demanded the rapid lifting of the economic sanctions. He dashed hopes that Tehran would build a gas pipeline to Europe to weaken the dominant role of Russia in the European gas market, citing transit problems and costs. At the same time, the Minister announced that his government would invest US$180 billion in the Iranian oil and gas industry by 2022. Other topics at the meeting included, among others, the proposed Energy Union in Europe, which both Maroš Šefčovič, Vice-president of the European Commission, and Rainer Baake, Parliamentary State Secretary in the Federal Ministry for Economic Affairs and Energy, called for, as well as the German energy transition. Bärbel Höhn, chairman of the German Bundestag's Environment Committee, referred to it as an important contribution by Germany to the creation of a global structure of a decentralized energy supply, which reduces dependencies and contributes to security and peace. Criticism came from Greenpeace head Kumi Naidoo, who stated that the high share of brown coal used for electricity generation was the "Achilles heel" of Germany's energy policy. Michael Fuchs, deputy chairman of the CDU/CSU parliamentary group, criticized the high burden placed on German citizens due to subsidies of 480 billion Euro earmarked for the energy transition.

== Criticism ==
Speculations (published in 2021) about one of the sponsors, the U.S. consultancy McKinsey, as secretly organizing the conference on behalf of the foundation and, according to Politico, wielding great influence on the conference's agenda, guests and events, were denied by McKinsey in 2023.

== See also ==
- Antalya Diplomacy Forum
- Halifax International Security Forum
- International relations
- International security
- Internationalism
- Nuclear Security Summit
- Pirate Security Conference
- Raisina Dialogue
- Shangri-La Dialogue
- Yalta European Strategy
