= Pirate Security Conference =

Annual event in Munich

- Formation: 2015
- Location: Munich, Germany
- Methods: Host conferences
- Website: pirate-secon.net

The Pirate Security Conference (german Piraten-Sicherheitskonferenz, PSC) is an annual conference about security topics in Munich since 2015. Since 2016 it cooperates with the Munich Security Conference in which the two conferences overlap and include jointly convened discussions. It is organized by Pirate Party Germany and international Pirate Parties. Most topics are about the impact of digital changes on foreign security and politics. The event is primarily aimed at all European citizens, parties and associations.

At the same time, the conference also aims to offer the responsible ministries and authorities, embassies and consulates located in Germany, and international companies a forum to exchange views on security policy issues. The Pirate Security Conference was initiated by Foundation 42, the party foundation of the Pirate Party Germany and is now organised and run by the Pirate Party Germany.

Topics discussed at the conference included key technologies for security provision, medicalisation and capitalisation of the security apparatus, cyber security, etc. Speakers at the conference included the politician Angelika Beer, the correspondent and author Peter Finkelgruen, the freelance journalist Enno Lenze and the politician Birgitta Jónsdóttir.

== Aim of the conference ==
The aim of the conference, which was initiated in 2015, is to provide a framework where different interested parties and groups can exchange ideas and develop and present new ideas in an official setting. The conference is also a way for the various pirate parties to get new ideas from experts in areas they are working on politically, and to enter into dialogue with politicians and these experts. The same goes for visitors to the conference; it is a link and a platform for dialogue between experts and society.

=== Conference 2015 ===
The 2015 conference, entitled "Security Policy after Snowden", took place on 24 and 25 January of that year, with topics including "New Challenges in International Security Policy", "Critical Infrastructure and its Protection Measures" and "Terrorist Threats - Facts, Myths and Reality". The speakers were Nicole Britz, chairwoman of the Bavarian Pirate Party; Enno Lenze, freelance journalist; Angelika Beer, member of the Schleswig-Holstein Landtag and former member of the Bundestag and the European Parliament; Rob Imre; and Yvonne Hofstetter, lawyer. The conference also included demands that an international framework for the governing of digital weapons and increase protection of cyberspace be implemented.

=== Conference 2016 ===
In 2016, the conference took place for the first time from 11 to 13 February at the Cristal conference hotel in Munich. Speakers included the Icelandic Pirate politician Birgitta Jónsdóttir, Angelika Beer, Enno Lenze, Björn Semrau and Lea Frings. Topics included "Critical infrastructure and how we protect it", "Cyber security - conflicts in the civil-military-diplomatic triangle" and "The century of instability? The domino effect of failed states". Discussions were also held at the conference on recommendations for the growing list of vulnerabilities in Industrial Control Systems (ICS) and provided proposals to address automated warfare and systemic cyber vulnerabilities in arms-control.

=== Conference 2017 ===
As in the previous year, the 2017 conference took place from 16 to 18 February at the Cristal conference hotel in Munich. Speakers included Alessandro Guarino, Alexandre Vautravers and Ivan Bartoš (computer expert and chairman of the Czech Pirate Party) The topics were "New Dimensions in the Threat Landscape", "Global Governance: Norms, Rules and Practices" and "Conflicts in the 21st Century". The conference included discussions on how Pirate parties can translate digital-rights concerns into political actions and place emphasis on data and algorithm control.

=== Conference 2018 ===
The 2018 conference took place on 17–18 February at the Echo e.V. building in Munich. Speakers included Ivan Bartoš, Chris C. Demchak, Chair of Cyber Security and Director of the Naval War College's Centre for Cyber Conflict Studies (C3S), Oktavía Hrund Jónsdóttir, Roger Näbig, Schoresch Davoodi. The theme was "Resilience", including "Resilience of Technical Systems and Critical Infrastructure", "Economic Resilience" and "Resilience from a Sociological Perspective". Discussions were held about the resilience of the Internet, including its possible fragmentation or re-nationalization.

=== Conference 2019 ===
On 16 and 17 February, the conference was held again in Munich under the title 'New Horizons - Unrecognised Challenges', with speakers including Chris Boos on the economic aspects of AI, Alessandro Guarino on the geopolitical significance of AI, Yvonne Hofstetter on the AI arms race, Elina Radionova-Girsa from Lithuania, and Adam Wolf and Schoresch Davoodi on the situation in Africa and the Middle East. The conference also concentrated discussions on the effects AI has on industrial society and the competitions between large technology platforms.

=== Conference 2020 ===
The 2020 conference, entitled "New Horizons - Multidimensional World Politics and Security Aspects", took place on 15 and 16 February 2020 at the "designer werkschau Munich" and featured speakers including Johannes Rundfeldt, Kurt Klein, Mirjam Fischer, freelance journalist and online editor, Gregory Engels, scholar Herbert Saurugg and Konstantinos Tsetsos.

=== Conference 2021 ===
In 2021, the conference was held as an online conference on 14–15 August 2021. The topic was "The Future World Order in the Aftermath of the Crisis" and speakers included Stéphane Koch, Manouchehr Shamsrizi, Enno Lenze, Dr Keith Goldstein, Dave Borghuis, Gregory Engels, Roderich Kiesewetter, Nathan Daschle and Mikuláš Peksa.

=== Conference 2022 ===
The 2022 conference took place on 18–19 June 2022 at the Impact Hub Praha in Prague. Speakers included Mikuláš Peksa, Gregory Engels, Alexander Isavnin, Paula Cipierre, Patrick Breyer, Paul C. Strobel, Fritz Felgentreu, Bandara Diss, Makar Diakonov, Enno Lenze, Schoresch Davoodi and Dennis Wufka. The topic was "Multipolar and Multidimensional Geopolitics in Interesting Times".

=== Conference 2023 ===
On 18 and 19 February 2023, the conference took place in Munich. Speakers included Georg Lösslmann, Theresa Fallon, Veronika Datzer, Borys Sobiewski, Gustav Gressel, Benjamin Tallis, Franziska Davies, Reza Parchizadeh, Schoresch Davoodi, Jo Zayner, Manuel Atug, Alexis Roussel, Nina Azadi and Laeed Zaghlami.

=== Conference 2024 ===
The 2024 conference was held on 17 and 18 February 2024 in Munich. The topic was "The Quantum Leap in Technology and Geopolitics" and speakers included Sara Hjalmarsson, Grit Friedrich, Anastasiya Shapochkina, Ronen Eidelman, Alexis Roussel, Benjamin Tallis, Mikuláš Peksa, Florian Gallwitz and Alexander Kohler.

On 10 May 2024, another conference was held online within the framework of the NAFO "Future Forum". The topics were "Russia's war of aggression and scenarios of global competition between major powers" and "(Dis)information". Speakers were Märt Pöder, Alexander Kohler, Sara Hjalmarrson and Schoresch Davoodi, among others.

=== Conference 2025 ===
The 10 year anniversary 2025 conference was held on 15 and 16 February 2025 in Munich. The topic of the conference was "How to deal with disruption in interesting times?". Speakers at the conference included Olena Tregub, Pat Mächler, Benjamin Tallis, Sara Hjalmarsson, Alexander Kohler, Stephen Douglas, Reza Parchizadeh, Theresa Fallon, Marcus Welsch, Philppe Burger, Alexis Roussel and Dietmar Pichler.

=== Conference 2026 ===
The 2026 conference was held on 14 and 15 February at the DesignWerkschau in Munich. The theme was "How should we deal with AI, hybrid warfare, drones, and other revolutionary developments?". Topics included artificial intelligence, disinformation and democratic resilience, hybrid warfare, the war in Ukraine, geopolitical developments and the political situation in Iran. Speakers included Marcus Welsch, Dietmar Pichler, Schoresch Davoodi, Babak Tubis, Philippe Burger, Mark Reicher, Reza Parchizadeh, Alexis Roussel, Marie Kresbach Kabera, Seydou Sougoulé, Sara Hjalmarsson and Alexander Kohler.
