= Kabyle people =

Berber ethnic group

Iqbayliyen, ⵉⵇⴱⴰⵢⵍⵉⵢⵏ
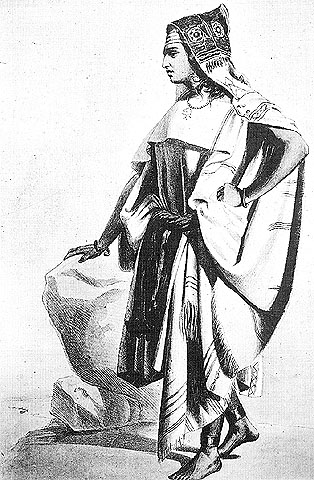
- Painting of a Kabyle woman in a traditional attire

Total population
- c. 6 million

Regions with significant populations
- Kabylia
- Algeria: c. 5 million
- France: c. 1 million
- Canada: 37,415

Languages
- Kabyle; Algerian Arabic, French

Religion
- Predominantly Sunni Islam; Christian and Irreligious minorities

Related ethnic groups
- Other Berber people

The Kabyle people (/kəˈbaɪl/, Kabyle: Izwawen or Leqbayel or Iqbayliyen, pronounced [iqβæjlijən]) are a Berber (Amazigh) ethnic group indigenous to Kabylia in the north of Algeria, spread across the Atlas Mountains, 160 kilometres (100 mi) east of Algiers. They represent the largest Berber population in Algeria and the second-largest in the whole of Africa.

Many of the Kabyles have emigrated from Algeria, influenced by factors such as the Algerian Civil War, cultural repression by the central Algerian government, and overall industrial decline. Their diaspora has resulted in Kabyle people living in numerous countries. Large populations of Kabyle people settled in France and, to a lesser extent, Canada (mainly Québec) and the United States.

The Kabyle people speak Kabyle, a Berber language. Since the Berber Spring of 1980, they have been at the forefront of the fight for the official recognition of Berber languages in Algeria.

== Etymology ==
The word 'Kabyle' (Kabyle: Iqbayliyen) is derived from the Arabic word qaba'il (قبائل), meaning 'tribes'. The term qaba'il was used, and is still somewhat used by various peoples in Algeria to refer to various mountain dwelling tribes, including the Kabyle people.

The term used for Kabyles specifically was 'Zwawa' ('Izwawen' in Kabyle, 'زواوة' in Arabic). This appellation has been used since the medieval era for the tribes of Greater Kabylia, and is featured in important medieval ethnographic works like Ibn Khaldun's. According to Mohamed Benrabah, the French initially used the term Kabyle to refer to all Berbers, but during the colonial era the term narrowed to refer only to the modern Kabyle people. Zwawa is still the most used term for Kabyles in areas such as western Algeria.

== History ==
The Kabyles were one of the few peoples in North Africa who remained independent during successive rule by the Carthaginians, the Romans, the Vandals, the Byzantines, and the Ottoman Turks. Even after the Arab conquest of North Africa, the Kabyle people still maintained possession of their mountains.

=== Fatimid Caliphate ===
Map of Kutama army campaigns and battles up to the overthrow of the Aghlabids

Between 902 and 909, after being converted to Isma'ilism and won over by Abu Abdallah's propaganda, the Kutama Berbers from present-day Little Kabylie helped contribute to the founding of the Fatimid Caliphate, whose support in the conquest of Ifriqiya resulted in the creation of the Caliphate, although the ruling Fatimid dynasty was Arab. After the conquest of Ifriqiya the Fatimids conquered the realm of the Rustamids on the way to Sijilmasa which they also then briefly conquered and where Abdullāh al-Mahdī Billah, who at the time was imprisoned, was then freed and then accepted as the Imam of the movement and installed as the Caliph, becoming the first Caliph and the founder of the ruling dynasty. The historian Heinz Halm describes the early Fatimid state as being "a hegemony of the Kutama and Sanhaja Berbers over the eastern and central Maghrib" and Prof. Dr. Loimeier states that rebellions against the Fatimids were also expressed through protest and opposition to Kutama rule. The weakening of the Abbasids allowed Fatimid-Kutama power to quickly expand and in 959 Ziri ibn Manad, Jawhar the Sicilian and a Kutama army conquered Fez and Sijilmasa in Morocco. During the reign of al-Aziz Billah, the role of the Kutama in the Fatimid army was greatly weakened as he significantly reduced their size in the army and included new socio-military groups. In 969 under the command of Jawhar, the Fatimid Kutama troops conquered Egypt from the Ikhsidids, the general Ja'far ibn Fallah was instrumental in this success: he led the troops that crossed the river Nile and according to al-Maqrizi, captured the boats used to do this from a fleet sent by Ikhshidid loyalists from Lower Egypt. The general Ja’far then invaded Palestine and conquered Ramla, the capital, he then conquered Damascus and made himself the master of the city and then he moved north and conquered Tripoli. It was around this time period that the Fatimid Caliphate reached its territorial peak of 4,100,000 km^{2}.

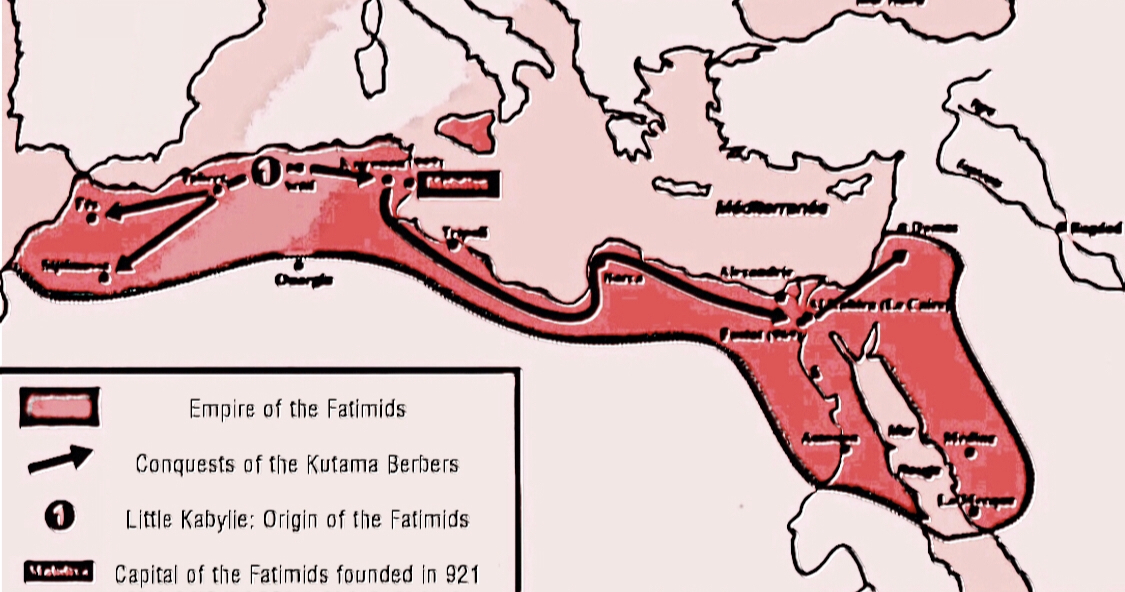
Origin and conquests of the Fatimids

=== Zirid dynasty ===
The Zirid Dynasty was a family of Sanhadja Berbers with origins in the Kabyle mountains. During their reign they established their rule over the entire Maghreb and also established rule in parts of Andalusia. They also had suzerainty over the Emirate of Sicily through the Kalbite emirs and later assassinated the ruler and took over the island. When the Emirate of Sicily was split into separate taifas, Ayyub Ibn Tamim entered Sicily and united all of the taifas under his rule until he left the island.

=== Hammadid dynasty ===
The Hammadids came to power after declaring their independence from the Zirids. They managed to conquer land in all of the Maghreb region, capturing and possessing significant territories such as: Algiers, Béjaïa, Tripoli, Sfax, Susa, Fez, Ouargla and Sijilmasa. South of Tunisia, they also possessed a number of oases that were the termini of trans-Saharan trade routes.

=== Kingdom of Ait Abbas and Kingdom of Kuku ===
These two Kabyle Kingdoms managed to maintain their independence and participated in notable battles alongside the Regency of Algiers, such as the campaign of Tlemcen and the conquest of Fez. In the early 16th century Sultan Abdelaziz of the Beni Abbes managed to defeat the Ottomans several times, notably in the First Battle of Kalaa of the Beni Abbes.

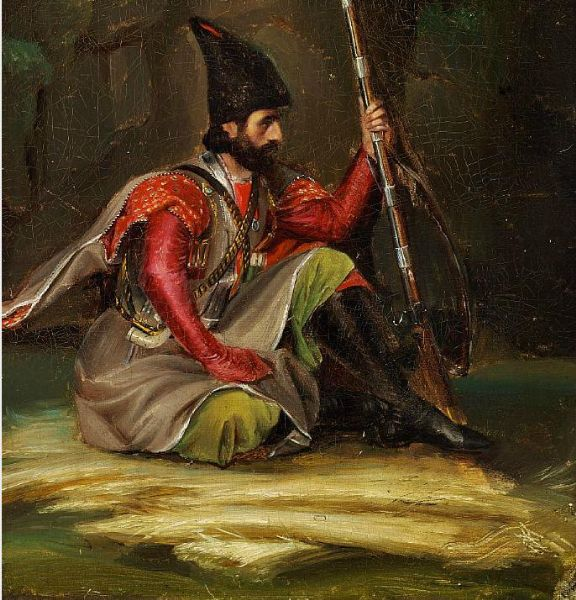
Martinus Rørbye (1803–1848): A seated Kabyle.

The Kabyles were relatively independent of outside control during the period of Ottoman Empire rule in North Africa. They lived primarily in three different kingdoms: the Kingdom of Kuku, the Kingdom of Ait Abbas, and the principality of Aït Jubar. Kabylia was the last part of northern Algeria to be colonised by the French during the years 1854–1857, despite vigorous resistance. Such leaders as Lalla Fatma N'Soumer continued the resistance as late as Mokrani's rebellion in 1871.

French colonists invented the Kabyle myth in the 19th century, which asserted that the Kabyle people were more predisposed than Arabs to assimilate into "French civilization." Lacoste explained that "turning the Arabs into invaders was one way of legitimizing the French presence".

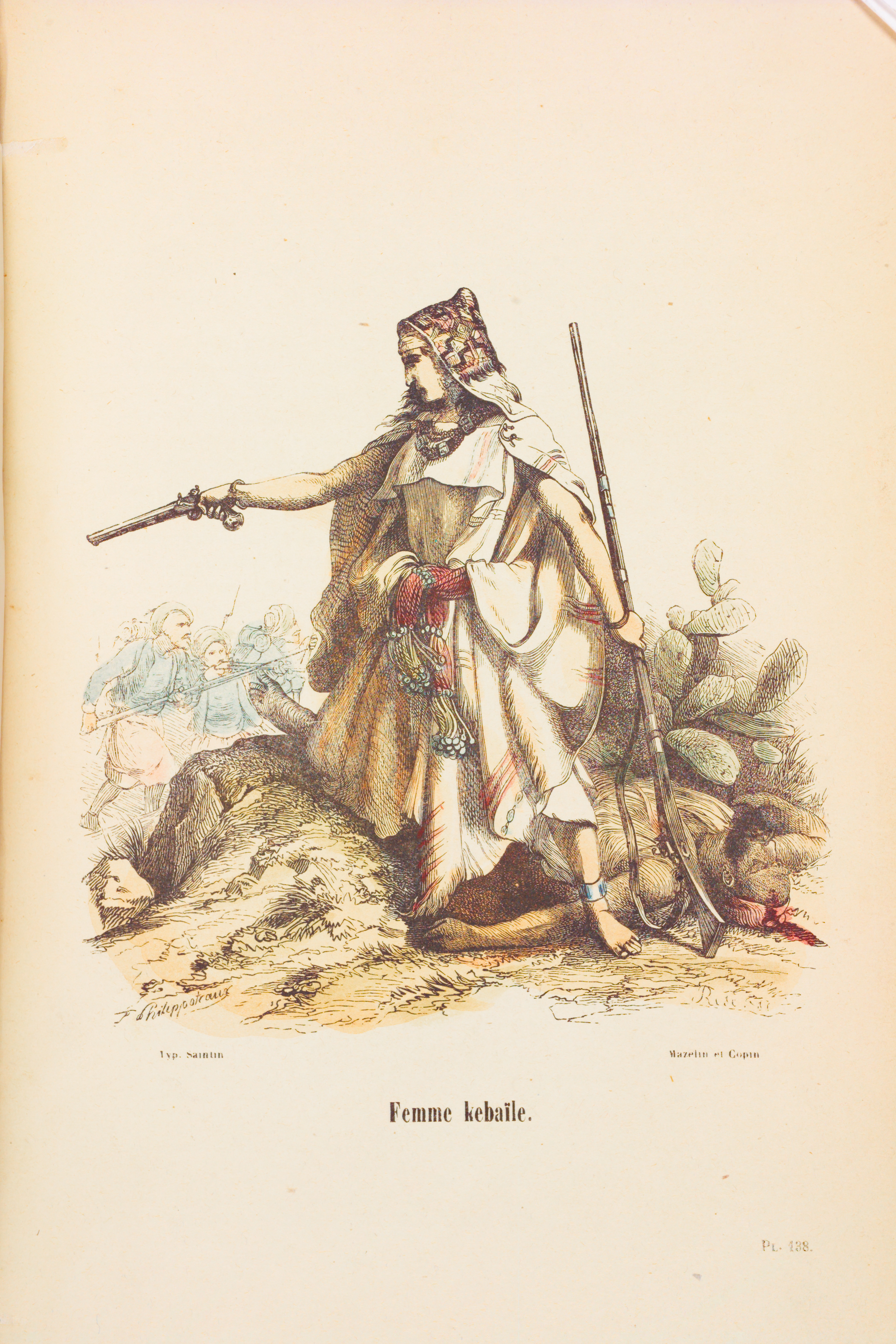
Lalla Fatma N'Soumer of Tariqa led the resistance against French colonization 1851–1857.

Kabyle villages were ruled through an indirect administration based on the preservation of Kabyle traditional political institutions such as the village's assemblies djemaas, this institution played a central role in the Kabyle's self-governance. The djemaas would resolve disputes between the village's inhabitants and edict the customary law rules. French officials confiscated much land from the more recalcitrant tribes and granted it to colonists, who became known as pieds-noirs. During this period, the French carried out many arrests and deported resisters, mainly to New Caledonia in the South Pacific. Due to French colonization, many Kabyle emigrated to other areas inside and outside Algeria. Over time, immigrant workers also began to go to France.

In the 1920s, Algerian immigrant workers in France organized the first party promoting Algerians independence. Messali Hadj, Imache Amar, Si Djilani Mohammed, and Belkacem Radjef rapidly built a strong following throughout France and Algeria in the 1930s. They developed militants who became vital to the fight for an independent Algeria. This became widespread after World War II.

Since Algeria gained independence in 1962, tensions have arisen between Kabylia and the central government on several occasions. In July 1962, the FLN (National Liberation Front) was split rather than united. Indeed, many actors who contributed to independence wanted a share of power, but the ALN (National Liberation Army), directed by Houari Boumédiène and joined by Ahmed Ben Bella, had the upper hand because of their military forces.

In 1963, the FFS party of Hocine Aït Ahmed contested the authority of the FLN, which had promoted itself as the only party in the nation. Aït Ahmed and others considered the central government led by Ben Bella authoritarian, and on September 3, 1963, the FFS (Socialist Forces front) was created by Hocine Aït Ahmed. This party grouped opponents of the regime then in place, and a few days after its proclamation, Ben Bella sent the army into Kabylia to repress the insurrection. Colonel Mohand Oulhadj also took part in the FFS and in the Maquis (fr) because he considered that the mujahideen were not treated as they should be. In the beginning, the FFS wanted to negotiate with the government but since no agreement was reached, the maquis took up arms and swore not to give them up as long as democratic principles and justice were a part of the system. But after Mohand Oulhadj's defection, Aït Ahmed could barely sustain the movement and after the FLN congress on April 16, 1964, which reinforced the government's legitimacy, he was arrested in October 1964. As a consequence, the insurrection was a failure in 1965 because it was hugely repressed by the forces of the ALN, under Houari Boumédiène. In 1965 Aït Ahmed was sentenced to death, but later pardoned by Ben Bella. Approximately 400 deaths were counted amongst the maquis.

In 1980, protesters mounted several months of demonstrations in Kabylia demanding the recognition of Berber as an official language; this period has been called the Berber Spring. In 1994–1995, the Kabyles conducted a school boycott, termed the "strike of the school bag". In June and July 1998, they protested, in events that turned violent, after the assassination of singer Matoub Lounès and the passage of a law requiring the use of the Arabic language in all fields.

On 18 April 2001, a Kabyle high school student, Massinissa Guermah, was arrested and murdered by Algerian gendarmes in the town of Beni Douala. Guermah's murder in police custody sparked a series of nationwide protests by the Kabyles that became known as a Black Spring, which resulted in at least 126 people being killed by the Algerian police and Gendarmerie Nationale, while several thousand others were injured or imprisoned. At the same time, organized Kabyle activism established the Arouch and neo-traditional local councils. The protests gradually decreased after the Kabyles won some concessions from President Abdelaziz Bouteflika.

On 6 January 2016, Tamazight was officially recognized in Algeria's constitution as a language equal to Arabic.

== Geography ==
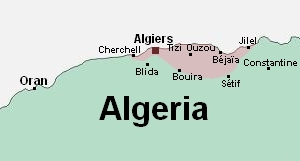
Regions of Kabyle settlements in Algeria

The geography of the Kabyle region played an important role in the people's history. The difficult mountainous landscape of the Tizi Ouzou and Bejaia provinces served as a refuge, to which most of the Kabyle people retreated when under pressure or occupation. They were able to preserve their cultural heritage in such isolation from other cultural influences.

The area supported local dynasties (Numidia, Fatimids in the Kutama periods, Zirids, Hammadids, and Hafsids of Bejaïa) or Algerian modern nationalism, and the war of independence. The region was repeatedly occupied by various conquerors. Romans and Byzantines controlled the main road and valley during the period of antiquity and avoided the mountains (Mont ferratus). During the spread of Islam, Arabs controlled plains but not all the countryside (they were called el aadua: enemy by the Kabyle).

The Regency of Algiers, under Ottoman influence, tried to have indirect influence over the people (makhzen tribes of Amraoua, and marabout).

The French gradually and totally conquered the region and set up a direct administration.

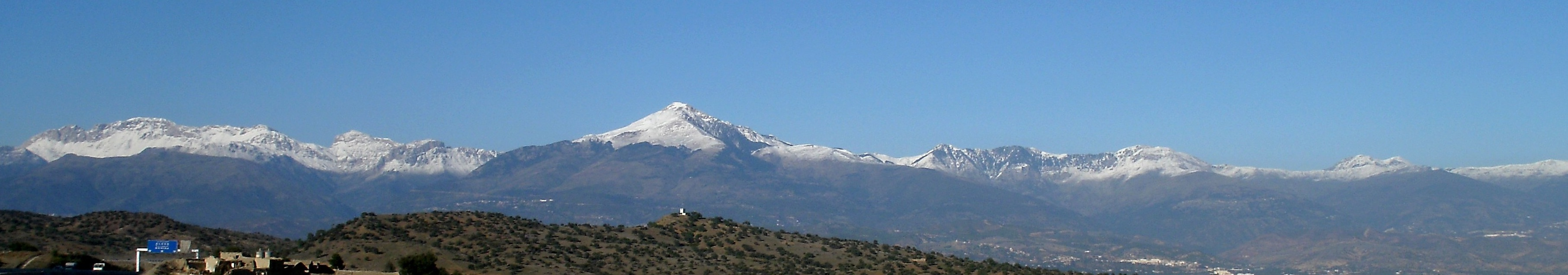
The Djurdjura chain

Topographic map of Kabylia.

Algerian provinces with significant Kabyle-speaking populations include Tizi Ouzou, Béjaïa and Bouira, where they are a majority, as well as Boumerdes, Sétif, Bordj Bou Arreridj, and Jijel. Algiers also has a significant Kabyle population, where they make up more than half of the capital's population.

The Kabyle region is referred to as Al Qabayel ("tribes") by the Arabic-speaking population and as Kabylie in French. Its indigenous inhabitants call it Tamurt Idurar ("Land of Mountains") or Tamurt n Iqbayliyen/Tamurt n Iqbayliyen ("Land of the Kabyle"). It is part of the Atlas Mountains and is located at the edge of the Mediterranean.

== Culture and society ==
=== Language ===
The Kabyle ethnic group speaks Kabyle, a Berber language of the Afroasiatic family. It is the largest Berber language in Algeria. In 2004, it was spoken by 3 million people and has significant Arabic, French, Latin, Greek, Phoenician, and Punic substratum, with Arabic loanwords representing 22.7% to 46% of the total Kabyle vocabulary, with many estimates putting it at about 35%. Many Kabyles also speak Algerian Arabic and French.

During the first centuries of their history, Kabyles used the Libyco-Berber writing system (ancestor of the modern Tifinagh). Since the beginning of the 19th century, and under French influence, Kabyle intellectuals began to use the Latin script. It is the basis for the modern Berber Latin alphabet.

After the independence of Algeria, some Kabyle activists tried to revive the Old Tifinagh alphabet. This new version of Tifinagh has been called Neo-Tifinagh, but its use remains limited. Kabyle literature has continued to be written in the Latin script.

=== Religion ===
The Kabyle people are mainly Muslim, with a small Christian minority. Many Zawaya exist all over the region; the Rahmaniyya is the most prolific.

Catholics of Kabyle background generally live in France. Recently, the Protestant community has had significant growth, particularly among Evangelical denominations.

=== Literature ===
The Kabyle people have a rich history of oral literature, such as asefru, performed by imusnawen.

== Economy ==
The traditional economy of the area is based on arboriculture (orchards and olive trees) and on the craft industry (tapestry or pottery). Mountain and hill farming is gradually giving way to local industry (textile and agro-alimentary). In the middle of the 20th century, with the influence and funding from the Kabyle diaspora, many industries were developed in this region. It has become the second most important industrial region in the country after Algiers.

== Politics ==
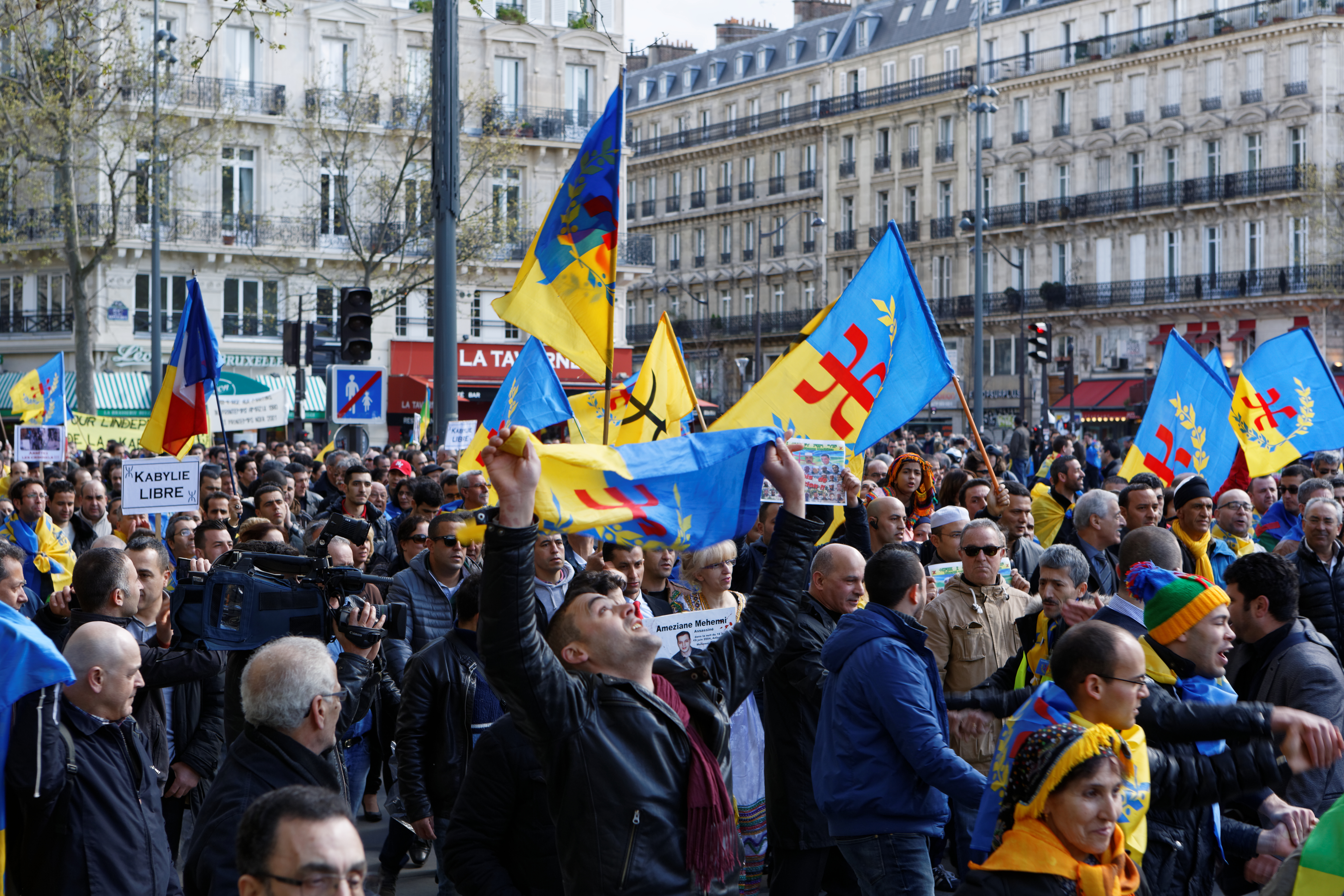
Demonstration by Kabyles in Paris in April 2016

The Kabyle have been fierce activists in promoting the cause of Berber (Amazigh) identity. The movement has three groups: those Kabyle who identify as part of a larger Berber nation (Berberists); those who identify as part of the Algerian nation (known as "Algerianists", some view Algeria as an essentially Berber nation); and those who consider the Kabyle to be a distinct nation separate from (but akin to) other Berber peoples (known as Kabylists).

- Two political parties dominate in Kabylie and have their principal support base there: the Socialist Forces Front (FFS), led by Ali Laskri, who replaced Hocine Aït Ahmed, and the Rally for Culture and Democracy (RCD), led by Mohcine Belabbès, who replaced Saïd Sadi. Both parties are secularist, Berberist and Algerianist.
- During the Black Spring of 2001, the Berber Arouch Citizens' Movement emerged as a revival of the village assembly, a traditional Kabyle form of democratic organization. The Arouch share roughly the same political views as the FFS and the RCD.
- The Black Spring also gave rise to the Movement for the Autonomy of Kabylie (MAK), a political organization that strove for Kabylie's right to a regional autonomy. On 21 April 2010, MAK proclaimed a Provisional Government of Kabylie in exile (ANAVAD). Ferhat Mehenni was elected president by the National Council of the MAK. In 2013, MAK officially became an independentist movement and renamed itself the Movement for the Self-Determination of Kabylia.

== Diaspora ==
For historical and economic reasons, many Kabyles have emigrated to France, both for work and to escape political persecution. They now number around 1 million people. Some notable French people are of full or partial Kabyle descent.

== Notable people ==
=== Sport ===
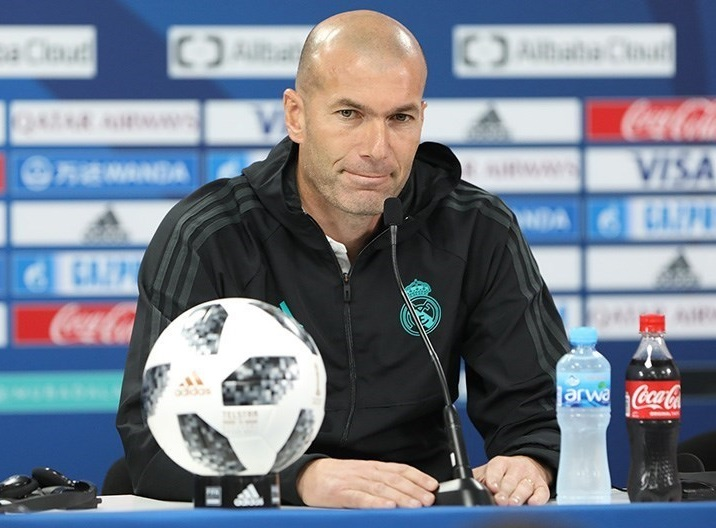
Zinedine Zidane

- Samir Aït Saïd
- Mohamed Allek
- Yacine Adli
- Hakim Arezki
- Larbi Benboudaoud
- Mustapha Dahleb
- Soraya Haddad
- Mohand Chérif Hannachi
- Cherif Hamia
- Kheira Hamraoui
- Salah Larbes
- Rabah Madjer
- Kylian Mbappé (through mother)
- Sarah Ourahmoune
- Moussa Saïb
- Hocine Soltani
- Mehdi Tahrat
- Zinedine Zidane

=== Business ===
- Ali Haddad
- Meziane Idjerouidene (through father)
- Issad Rebrab

=== Cinema ===
- Isabelle Adjani (through father)
- Karim Aïnouz (through father)
- Mhamed Arezki
- Habiba Djahnine
- Fellag
- Mohamed Hilmi
- Jalil Lespert (through mother)
- Rouiched
- Erika Sawajiri (through mother)
- Malik Zidi (through father)

=== Music ===
- Abderrahmane Abdelli
- Lounis Aït Menguellet
- Slimane Azem
- Chérifa
- Malika Domrane
- Rachid Ferhani
- Idir
- Mohamed Iguerbouchène
- Marina Kaye (through mother)
- Souad Massi
- Matoub Lounès
- Kamel Messaoudi
- Emma Saïd Ben Mohamed (through father)
- Marcel Mouloudji (through father)
- El Hadj M'Hamed El Anka
- Nâdiya
- Kamel Ouali
- Rilès
- Takfarinas
- Oulahlou

=== Paint ===
- M'hamed Issiakhem
- Hamid Tibouchi
- Rezki Zerarti

=== Politics ===
- Abane Ramdane
- Ferhat Abbas
- Belaïd Abrika
- Hocine Aït Ahmed
- Ali Yahia Abdennour
- Fadela Amara
- Cheikh Mokrani
- Belkacem Lounes
- Mohand Arav Bessaoud
- Malek Boutih
- Lalla Fatma N'Soumer
- Ferhat Imazighen Imula
- Firmus
- Salima Ghezali
- Krim Belkacem
- Kasdi Merbah
- Mohamed Mediène
- Mouloud Kacem Naît Belkacem
- Ahmed Ouyahia
- Saïd Sadi

=== Science ===
- Si Amar
- Mohammed Arkoun
- Maǧid At Buttmer
- Mouloud Mammeri
- Salem Chaker
- Mustapha Ishak Boushaki
- Noureddine Melikechi
- Rachid Ouyed
- Si Saïd
- Yousef Saad
- Abdelmalek Sayad
- Mohand Tazerout
- Tassadit Yacine

=== Literature ===
- Arezki Aït Larbi
- Taos Amrouche
- Kahina Bahloul (through father)
- Tahar Djaout
- Nabile Farès
- Mouloud Feraoun
- Mustapha Ourrad
- Si Mohand
- Salem Zenia

== See also ==
- List of Kabyle people
- Ain Taya Forest
