= Fadhma Aït Mansour =

Algerian poet and folksinger (c.1882–1967)

- Born: c. 1882; Tizi Hibel, Algeria
- Died: 9 July 1967; Saint-Brice-en-Coglès, France
- Occupations: Poet and folksinger
- Children: Jean Amrouche; Taos Amrouche
- Writing career
- Subject: Autobiography

Marguerite-Fadhma Aït Mansour Amrouche (Kabyle: Faḍma At Menṣur; c. 1882 in Tizi Hibel, Algeria – July 9, 1967, in Saint-Brice-en-Coglès, France) was a poet and folksinger.

== Biography ==
She was born in 1882 in a Kabylie village, the illegitimate daughter of a widow. Facing harsh discrimination from within her surroundings, she left her village to study at a secular school. Later, when she was with the Sisters at Aït Manguellet hospital, she converted to Roman Catholicism. She met another Kabyle Catholic convert, Antoine-Belkacem Amrouche, whom she married in 1898 or 1899. They had eight children together, including writers Jean Amrouche and Taos Amrouche, but only two of the children were still alive at the time of her death. The family first moved to Tunis, where Taos was born, and then to France.

During her lifetime, she made a considerable impact on the works of Jean and Taos. The folk songs she sang to her family were compiled and translated to French by Jean in 1939 as Chants berbères de Kabylie. In 1967, Taos made a music album in Kabyle bearing the same title as Jean's folk song collection.

Her autobiography Histoire de ma vie was published posthumously in 1968. This book discusses mainly about the life she lived as a woman living in two different worlds: between the traditional Kabyle life and language and the colonial power France, its language, and particularly its predominant religion, Christianity.
