= Oulahlou =

- Born: Abderahmane Lahlou; August 9, 1963 (age 63); Ighil Ali, Béjaïa Province
- Genre: Berber music
- Occupation: Singer songwriter
- Instruments: Vocals, guitar
- Years active: 1998–present

Abderrahmane Lahlou (Kabyle: Abderaḥman Laḥlu) better known by his stage name Oulahlou is an Algerian Kabyle singer-songwriter.

== Biography ==
Oulahlou was born on August 9, 1963, in the village of Takorabt, in the commune of Ighil Ali, Béjaia Province, Algeria. He began his education in his home village before attending the Collège Jean‑Amrouche in Ighil‑Ali and later the lycée in Akbou, where he obtained his baccalauréat. He went on to study at the University of Constantine, earning a licence (Bachelor's degree) in psychology.

Oulahlou's first album, Itbiren (1998), marked the beginning of his professional singing career, however, his breakthrough only came in 2001, during the Black Spring, where his songs, Pouvoir assassin (“Assassin Power”), Arraw n Tlelli (“Children of Freedom”), and Ulac smaḥ ulac (“No Pardon”) became anthems for the demonstrators during that period. He is considered one of the leading figures of Berber music along with Ait Menguellet, Idir, and others. He has been described as a singer who denounces corruption and authoritarianism, advocating for freedom and the recognition of Tamazight as an official language. He insists his work is not political discourse but rather “a cultural and artistic commitment to the freedom of peoples.”

In a 2016 interview with Jeune Afrique, Oulahlou declared that: "Since Algeria's independence, Kabyle music has become the weapon of all struggles" adding that music is "the best and only vector of expression, since Kabyles have no other means of protest. All other spaces have been closed to us." Oulahlou's songs were widely adopted during the Hirak protests that began in Algeria in February 2019, he went on to release a new double album featuring 18 songs in 2021.

=== Censorship ===
Oulahlou has faced significant restrictions from Algerian authorities. In January 2023, he was prevented from boarding a flight at Houari Boumediene Airport to perform a scheduled concert at the Cabaret Sauvage in Paris, part of an international tour planned for Yennayer. The RCD party denounced this as "an attack on freedom of movement and the exercise of artistic freedom in violation of the constitution," noting that Oulahlou was "marginalized and banned from the airwaves in his own country". According to local sources, Oulahlou faced a ban on singing and traveling, effectively placing him under virtual house arrest in his village. Despite these obstacles, he continues to release new music.

== Discography ==
=== Album ===
- Itbiren (1998)
- Si 54 ar 99 (1999)
- Uccen D Weydi (2000)
- Pouvoir Assassin (2001)
- Terwi (2001)
- Ulac Smah Ulac (2002)
- Suzzana (2003)
- Azul al Paris (2005)
- L3ID (2005)
- Arraw Tllelli (2006)
- Hemlegh kem (2008)
- Slilwan (2010)
- Nostalgik (2012)
- Times d wurar (2014)
- Ma Liberté (2018)
- Adrar inu (2021)
