= Achimi =

Deity

Achimi was the buffalo god of the Kabyle people of Algeria. With his father, the buffalo god Itherther, they were responsible for the development of hunting and meat-eating in Kabyle mythology.

== Mythology ==
Achimi was the son of the first buffalo Itherther and Thamuatz. After a close encounter with the first humans, Achimi received advice from an ant who told him how the world worked. He said that if he wanted a comfortable but short life, he would have to live with and serve humans. If he wanted a long and free life, he could live wild but would always be hungry. Achimi chose freedom. The ant also told him that he could mate with his mother and sister. Achimi returned home and did so. When Itherther found out, the father and son fought. Defeated, Itherther ran away.

With his mother and sister, Achimi reproduced to create a herd of buffalo. Many years later, when Achimi was old, the herd were cold, hungry and suffering. Achimi remembered the advice of the ant and realised that it would be better to have a short but comfortable life living with humans. He took the herd to where the humans lived. The buffalo were welcomed, and from then on, mankind kept cattle.
