= Ait Mansour =

Ait Mansour At Menṣur
- Kabyle tribe
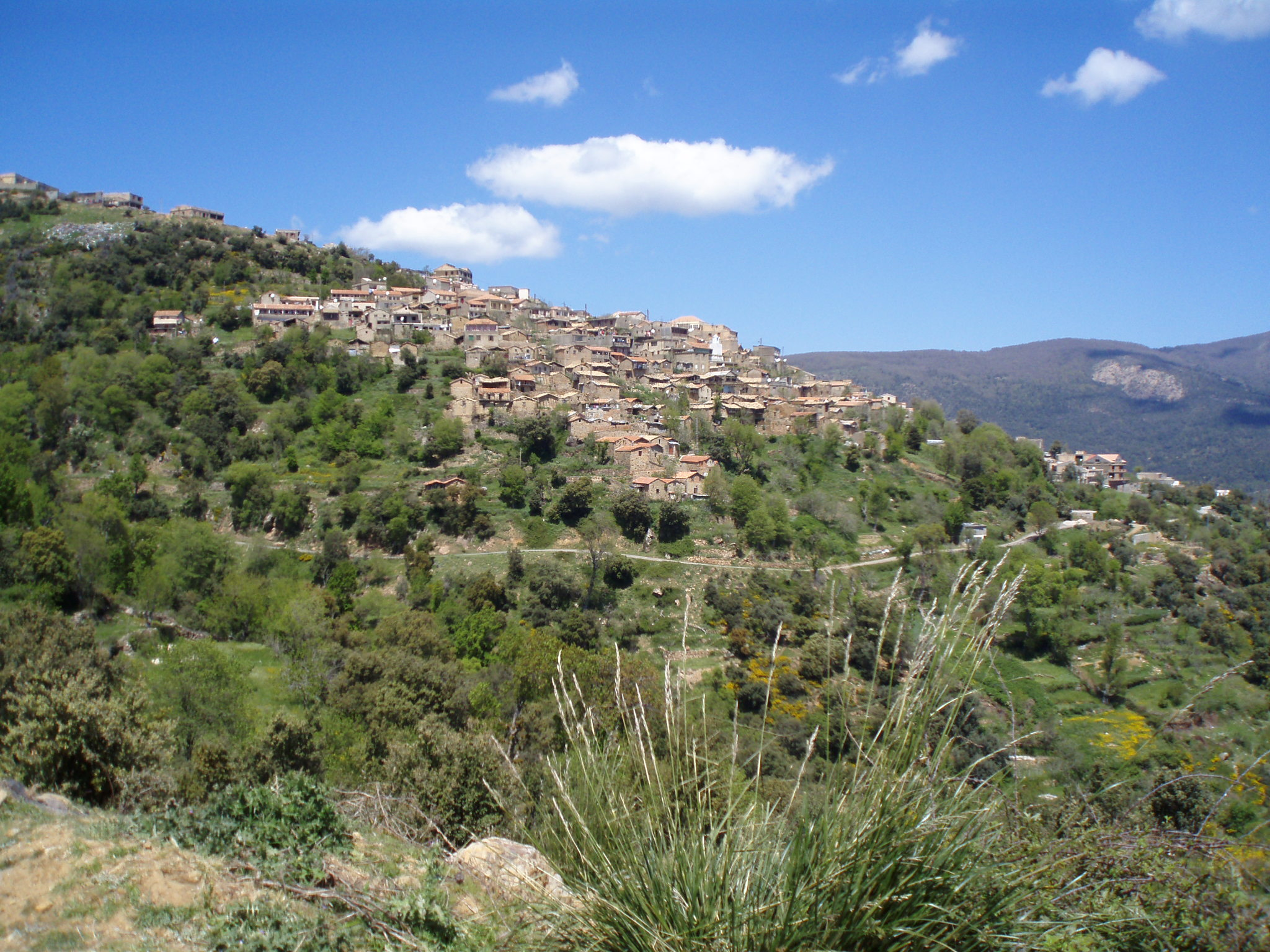
- View on the village of Imaghdacene
- Ethnicity: Kabyles
- Location: Mount Akfadou, Kabylia
- Language: Kabyle
- Religion: Islam

Ait Mansour (Kabyle: At Menṣur is a non-confederated Kabyle tribe located on Mount Akfadou, in Kabylia.

== Geography ==
=== Socio-political organization ===
The tribe's territory corresponds to the commune of Akfadou and is composed of the following villages: Ait Allouane, Ait Amara, Ait Saada, Aourir, Ferhoune, Ilbaten, Imaghdacene, Khellil, Mzouara, Rezag, Tagroudja, Taourirt, Tapount, Tiniri, Tizamourine and Zioui.
