= Ait Irane =

Aït Irane ⴰⵉⵜ ⵉⵔⴰⵏⴻ آيت إيران
- Village
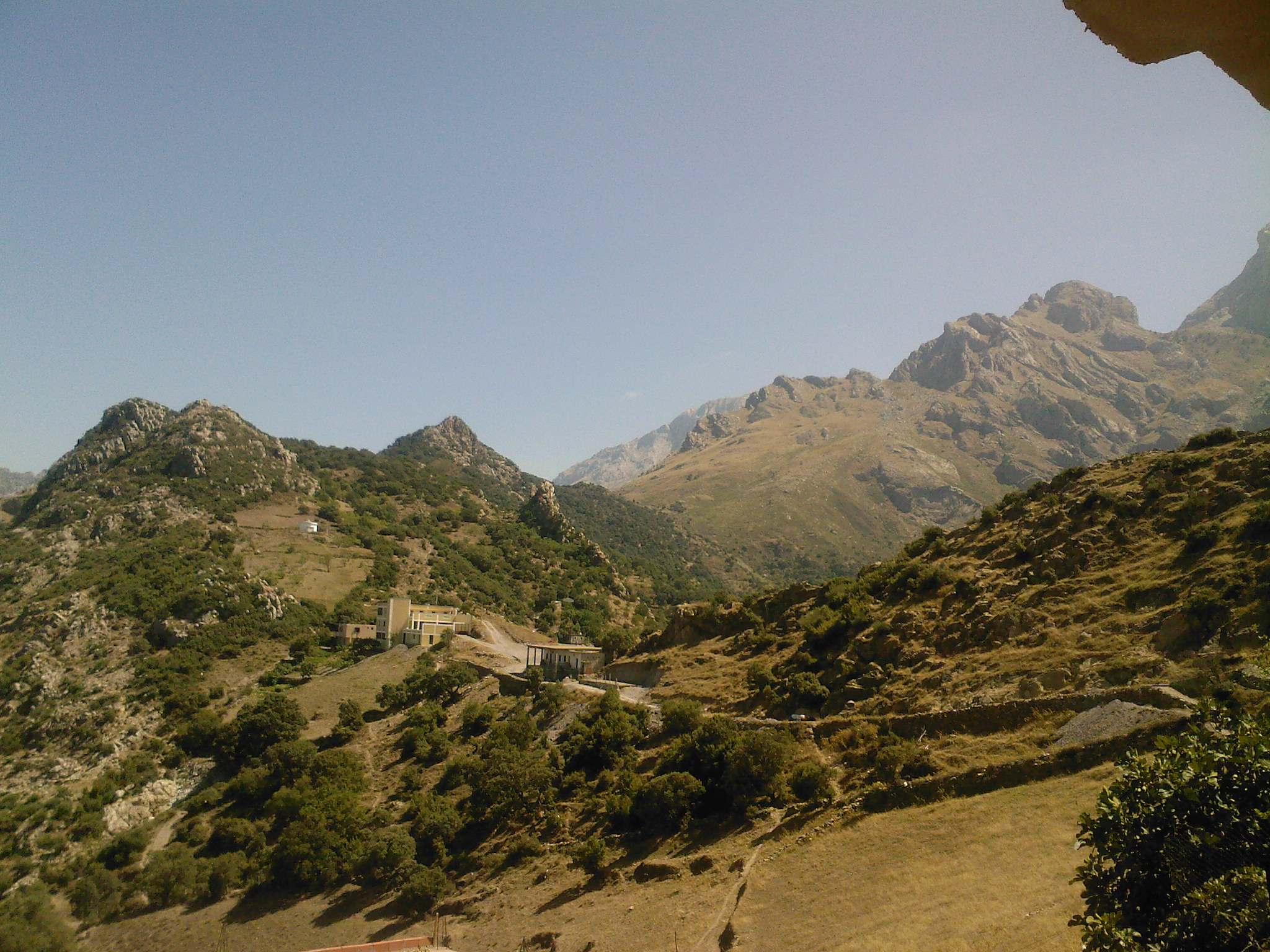
- View of the Djurdjura Range
- Nickname: Ath Yiran or At Yiran

- Location within Algeria
- Coordinates: 36.5°N 4.016667°E
- Country: Algeria
- Province: Tizi Ouzou
- District: Ouadhia
- Communes: Aït Bouaddou
- Elevation: 2,766 ft (843 m)

Population (2010)
  - Total: 1,173
- Time zone: UTC+1 (CET)

Aït Irane (Taqbaylit: French pronunciation: [ath yir'en]), ath yirane (in Kabyle) ⴰⵉⵜ ⵉⵔⴰⵏⴻ in Tifinagh, means izmawen, is one of the villages of the Aït Bouadou commune, also called Ath Vouvaddou or Beni Bouaddou. Aït Bouadou is a commune of the Ouadhia District (daïra) which is a Tizi Ouzou Province (wilaya) in the Kabylie region of Algeria.

== History ==
=== French invasion ===
Captain of engineers Péchot, head of the Arab bureau's Algiers section, was given the mission of a good will tour of the tribes.

The Arab bureau section in Algiers was created by a ministerial decision of 22 March 1849. The territory of the subdivision included, according to the organization of 16 April 1849: 1° the circle of Algiers, composed of the Sahel of Algiers, of the bach aghalik of Sebaou, of the agaliks of the Khachena and the Flissa and of the unsurrendered tribes of Kabylie; 2° the circle of Dellys, composed of the suburb of Dellys, the caïdals of the Beni-Tour, Beni-Slyim, Sebaou-El-Kodim, Isser-Drœu, Isser-El-Djediane and Isser-Oulad-Smir.

Si Ahmed Taïeb ben Salem, khalifa d'A])d el Kader, was camped at Beni-bou-Addou, on the north flank of the Djurdjura; he had with him the remains of his regulars and a group of Arab horsemen who had hitched their star to his and whose ranks were thinning daily from desertions brought on by lack of resources; so he welcomed a reason for some skirmishes and looting.

Lieutenant-colonel Charles Denis Bourbaki first took the hamlet of Tassoukit, then attacked Ir'il-Imoula, which defended itself vigorously, but was unable to hold out long against French troops. The cherif fled towards the plain of Guechtoula, trying to reach Djurdjura; the chasseurs pursued and pushed him hard for five or six kilometers, as far as the foot of the villages of the Beni-bou-Addou, seconded by a goum, who was camped near the Mcchtras. Bou Bar'la managed to escape, but this shameful flight lowered his prestige in the eyes of Kabyles. He tried again, among the Beni-Sedka and the Zouaoua, to recruit contingents to contest the terrain taken by the French, but did not meet with any success and did not reappear until the very end of the operations there.

On 27 February 1847, surrender of si Ahmed Taïeb ben Salem in Aumale: it was followed by that of Bel Kassem or Kassi. The latter was named bach-aghadu Sebaou; Ben Salem was authorized to travel to Mecca, and his brother, Aomar ben Salem, was named bachagha of the Beni-Djaad and of the Sahel oued.

== Climate ==
Aït Irane has a hot, temperate climate. The village has an average yearly temperature of 15.4 °C. The hottest month of the year is August, reaching an average temperature of 26.2 °C. In January, the average temperature is 7.0 °C. Rainfall averages 921 mm.

The minimum average rainfall is in July with only 4 mm. In January, rainfall is the heaviest, with an average of 149 mm.

The rainfall variation between the moistest month and the dryest month is 145 mm. Yearly Temperature Variation is 19.2 °C.

== Villages ==
Aït Bouaddou consists of nine villages:

- Aït Amar
- Aït Djemaa, Commune Headquarter
- Aït Khalfa
- Ait Irane, at the altitude of 813 meters.
- Aït Ouel Hadj
- Aït Maalem
- Ibadissen
- Takherradjit
- Tamkarbout

== See also ==
- Aït Bouaddou
- Villages of Aït Bouaddou
- Ouadhia District
