= Aït Bouaddou =

Aït Bouaddou ⴰⵉⵜ ⴱⵄⵓⴷⴷⵄⵓ أيت بوعدو
- Commune and town
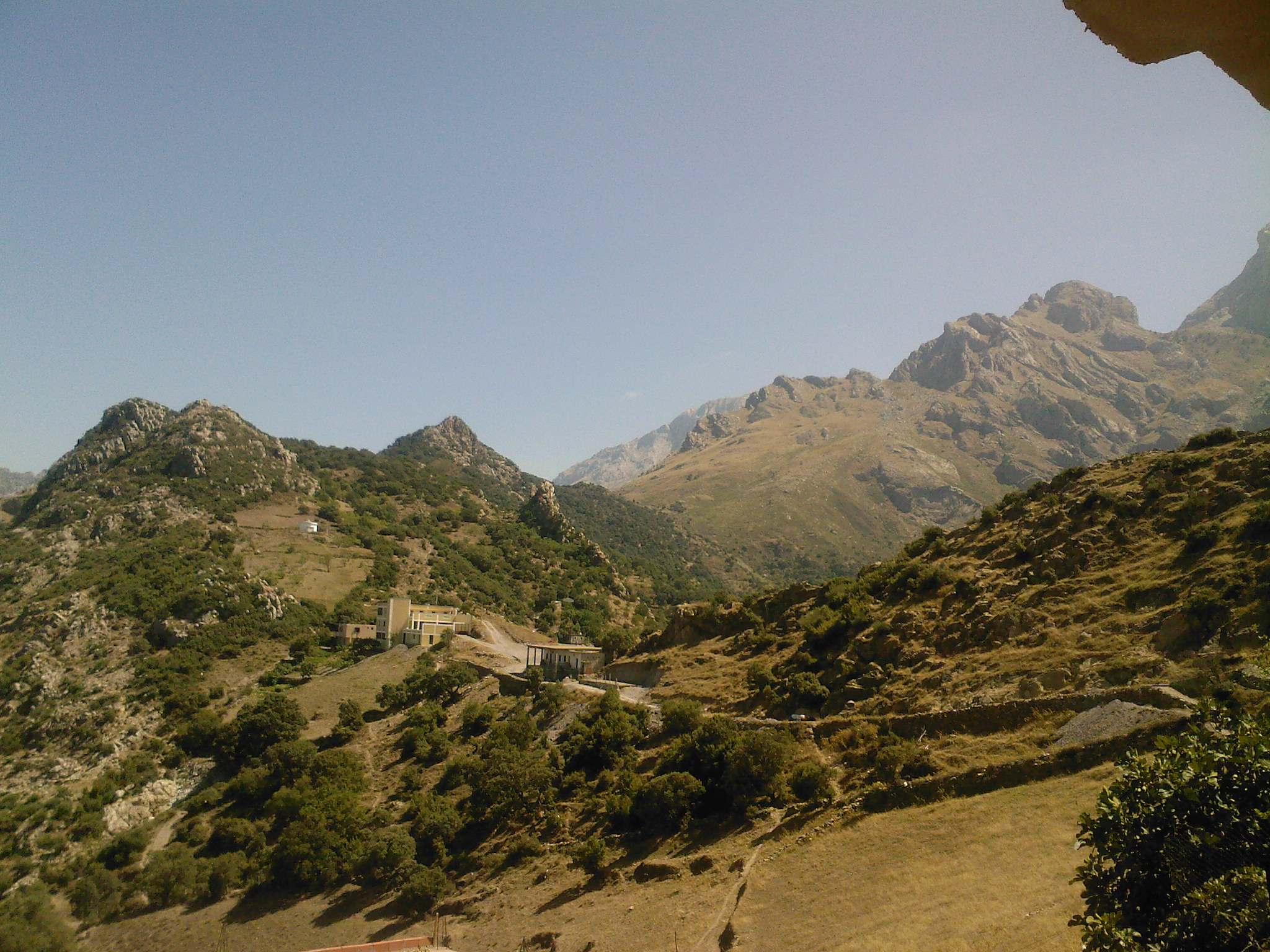
- View of the Djurdjura Range
- Nickname: Ath Vouvaddou or Beni Bouaddou

- Location within Algeria
- Coordinates: 36.5°N 4.016667°E
- Country: Algeria
- Province: Tizi Ouzou
- District: Ouadhia

Area
  - Total: 15.2 sq mi (39.3 km^{2})

Population (2008)
  - Total: 14,435
- Time zone: UTC+1 (CET)

Aït Bouaddou, also called Ath Vouvaddou or Beni Bouaddou, is a commune in the Ouadhia District of Tizi Ouzou Province in the Kabylie region of Algeria.

== Geography ==
Located near the mountains of Djurdjura, the town has eight villages and about 17,000 inhabitants.

- Aït Djemaa, administrative centre
- Aït Maalem,
- Ibadissen,
- Aït Amar,
- Aït Ouel hadj
- Aït Irane, altitude 813 meters
- Aït Khalfa
- Takherradjit

=== Localisation ===
Aït Bouaddou is in the Tizi Ouzou Wilaya southern and is bordered by :

- East : Agouni Gueghrane.
- West : Ath Boughardane (Assi Youcef).
- South : Djurdjura Range.
- North : Tizi N'Tleta.

== See also ==
- Communes of Algeria
- Villages of Aït Bouaddou
