= Itherther =

Itherther is a deity in the mythology of the Kabyle people of Algeria. According to legend, Itherther was a buffalo who existed at the beginning of time, together with a female calf named Thamuatz. Itherther and Thamuatz emerged from a dark subterranean realm called Tlam. They preferred the light of the earth to the darkness of Tlam and chose to remain there. Itherther and Thamuatz had a son called Achimi, and a daughter. Achimi mated with his mother and sister and when Itherther found out, he fought with his son. Defeated, Itherther ran away. In time, with his semen, he created seven new species of animal.
