= Slimane Azem =

Algerian singer

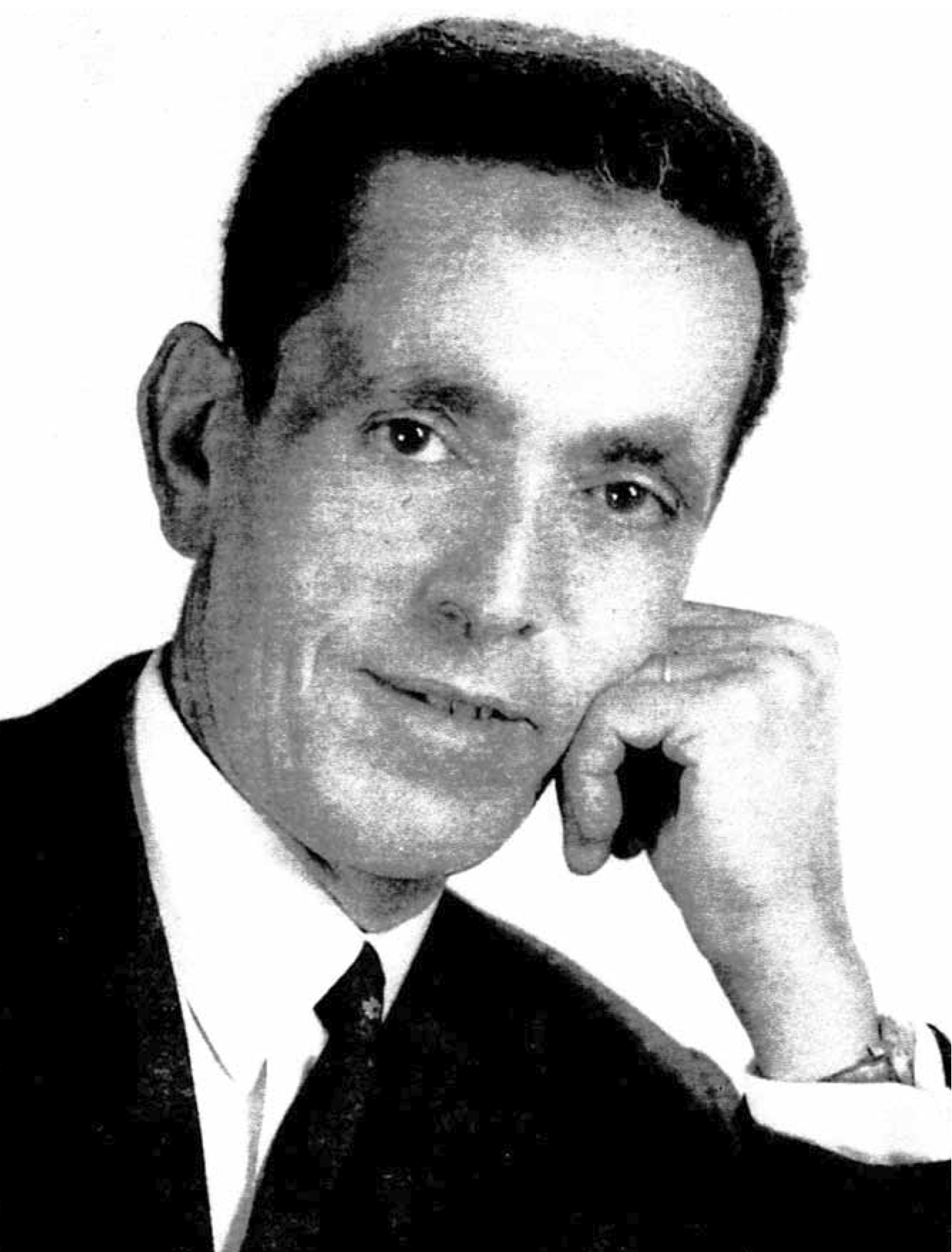

Background information
- Born: September 19, 1918; Agouni Gueghrane, Algeria
- Died: January 31, 1983 (aged 64) Moissac, France
- Genres: Chaabi
- Occupations: Singer, musician, poet
- Instrument: guitar

Slimane Azem (Kabyle: Sliman Ɛezem, September 19, 1918 – January 31, 1983) was an Algerian singer and poet, born in Agouni Gueghrane (kabylie region), that composed hundreds of songs in more than 40 years of artistic life. A great admirer of the poet Si Mohand, Slimane Azem included in his songs different isefra (traditional poetry) by this author.

== Biography ==
Azem was born September 19, 1918, at Agouni Gueghrane, a small village located on the foothills of Djurdjura. Nothing predestined this son of a poor farmer to a musical career. A rather mediocre student, he had a passion for the La Fontaine's Fables that would later influence his writings and compositions. At the age of 11, he became a farm worker for a colonist in Staouéli, a small resort near Algiers. In 1937, he moved to Longwy in France and found work in a steel mill operation before being mobilized during the "Phoney War", serving in Issoudun. In 1940, he was discharged and went to Paris where he was hired as an assistant electrician in the Paris Métro. He was accustomed to life in the village in the great outdoors, but was now confined in tunnels and underground eight hours a day in the metro. In 1942, he was requisitioned as part of the Service du travail obligatoire, working in Rhineland work camps and remaining there until its liberation in 1945.

Having received death threats during the independence of Algeria, the singer was fled to France in 1962. He then became a legendary voice that Kabyles expatriates could only listen to on Radio Paris in his quart d'heure kabyle (fifteen minutes Kabyle daily) show. Azem was, in fact, banned from airing in his own country and his music circulated only clandestinely, his name could only be read in lowercase in brief, daily of his country. In 1970 he was awarded a gold disc along with the singer Noura, imposing it as one of the best French sales. At the same time he became member of the SACEM, the club of famous French stars. In Paris, he won a stewardship coffee in the 15th arrondissement. He took the opportunity to interpret there his first compositions. Noticed and encouraged by Mohamed El Kamel, former member of Bachtarzi ensemble (named after Mahieddine Bachtarzi), he persevered in singing. Slimane finally recorded his first album with the song A muh muh has. For all those Kabyles dealing with homesickness, his records were highly sought after at Madame Sauviat, the only record store that sold at that time albums of Maghrebi and Oriental artists. This woman, of Auvergne origin, whose heirs now keep the shop on Boulevard de la Chapelle, presented Slimane to the record company Pathé-Marconi.

During the '70s, he made comic duets with the famous Cheikh Nouredine and sang Algérie, mon beau pays (Algeria, my beautiful country) and Carte de Résidence (Residence Card) in French. Over the recordings, Slimane Azem conquered a wide community audience through his lyrics parables where he staged animals and arises as a singer politically engaged. Then his inspiration declined.

He would later write a song in tribute to the Berber Spring, Ɣef Teqbaylit yuli was (On Kabylia rises the day).

He never denied his peasant roots and spent much of his earnings in buying a farm in Moissac (Tarn-et-Garonne), where he spent six months a year cultivating his nostalgia in his fig and olive tree plantations. Slimane feared death in exile. It finally occurred a January 28, 1983, on his farm.

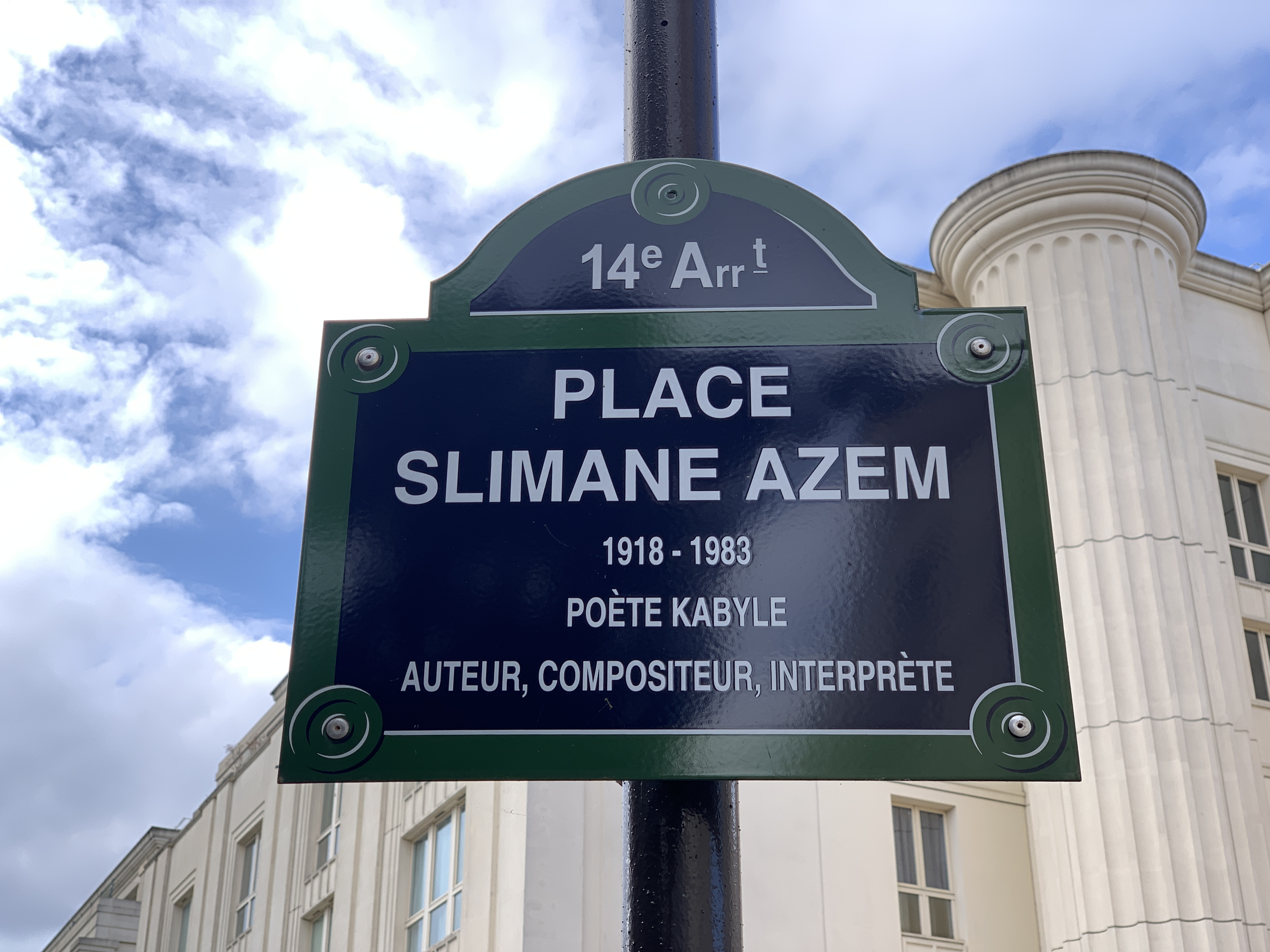
Slimane-Azem Square in Paris

Since 2008, the city of Moissac decided to honor the old Berber singer giving a town square that bears his name. In December 2013, the city of Paris decided to honor him too with a square in the 14th arrondissement. The plate was not visible however until 2014.

He was the brother of Ouali Azem, Member of Parliament from 1958 to 1962 under the French Fifth Republic.

== Discography ==
- Awine yelane dhel fahem (1970)

== Songs ==
- 173 songs recorded (see: catalog of published works at SACEM)
- A Muh A Muh
- Awine yelane dhel fahem
- Effɤ ay ajrad tamurt-iw (Grasshoppers leave my country), covered in 1997 by Lounès Matoub.
- Ɣef Teqbaylit yuli was
- La carte de résidence
- Algérie mon beau pays

== Bibliography ==
- Nacib, Youssef (2002). Slimane Azem Le poète (in French). Paris: PUBLISUD. p. 713.
- Azem, Slimane (1984). Izlan – Recueil De Chants Kabyles (in French). Paris: Numidie Music. p. 184.
- Ahmed, Mehdi (2002). Slimane Azem, Le maître de la chanson berbère (in French). Tizi Ouzou: Édition Mehdi. p. 383.
- Tas, Idir (2021). Bouquet de 21 chansons kabyles, Les Editions du Net, Paris, 2021, 118p. ISBN 978-2-312-08744-3
