= Asefru =

Poetic composition of the Berber literature of Kabylia

The asefru (pl. isefra) is a traditional poetic form in the Berber literature of Kabylia. The term comes from the verb "sefru", which means both to clarify or explain and to relieve or set free, and can also mean to thresh wheat. The form is a sort of short sonnet with a ternary structure, formed by three strophes of three verses each. The rhymes follow the pattern AAB AAB AAB, while the length of the three verses of each strophe is 7 + 5 + 7 syllables.

It is a relatively new meter compared to those from traditional poetry, probably born around the middle of the 19th century, and the poet who has indissolubly linked his name to this type of composition is Si Mohand. The asefru is usually read or recited but can also be sung, and numerous examples of isefra sung are present in the repertoire of different Kabyle singers, such as Taos Amrouche (for example Vaste est la prison, Vast is the prison), Slimane Azem (Effɤ ay ajrad tamurt-iw, Grasshopper, leave my country) or Malika Domrane (Nnehta, Sighing).

An example of asefru (Si Mohand):

Ggulleɣ seg Tizi-wuzzu
armi d Akfadu
ur ḥkimen dg' akken llan

A neṛṛez wal' a neknu
axiṛ daεwessu
anda ttqewwiden ccifan

Lɣ^{w}erba tura deg uqerru
welleh ard a nenfu
wala leεquba ɣer yilfan

Translation:

I swear, from Tizi Ouzou
up the Akfadou's pass
none of those shall command me

I break but I do not bend
I'd rather be damned
there where pimps govern

Emigration is my destiny
God, better is the exile
than the law of Pigs
