= Jean Amrouche =

Algerian francophone writer, poet and journalist

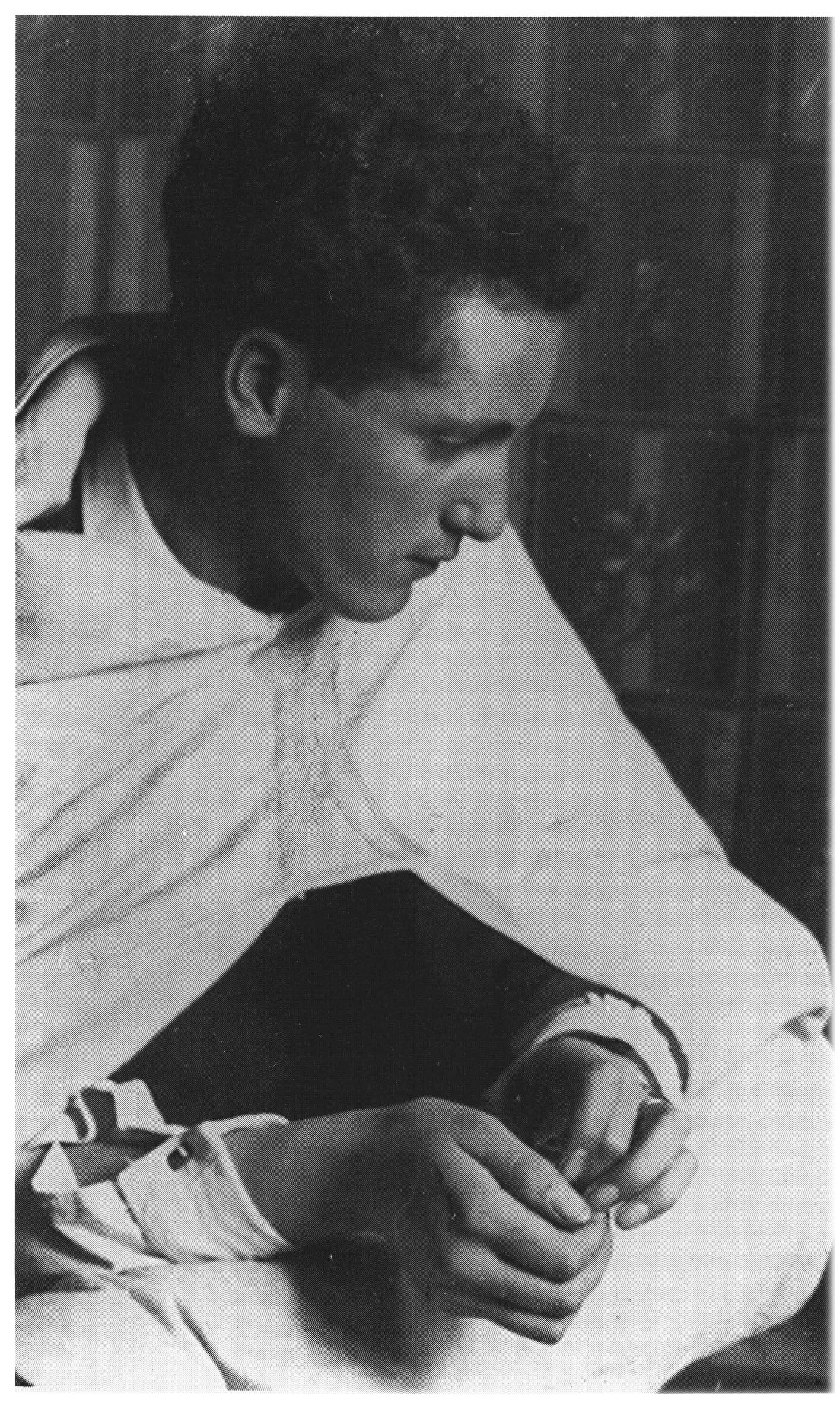
- Born: February 7, 1906; Ighil Ali, Petite Kabylie
- Died: April 16, 1962 (aged 56); Paris, France
- Mother: Fadhma Aït Mansour
- Relatives: Taos Amrouche (sister)

Jean el Mouhoub Amrouche (Kabyle: Jean-lmuhub Ɛemruc; 7 February 1906 in Ighil Ali, French Algeria – 16 April 1962 in Paris, France) was an Algerian francophone writer, poet and journalist.

== Biography ==
Jean el Mouhoub Amrouche was born February 7, 1906, in Ighil Ali, in the valley of Soumman, in petite Kabylie to a Kabyle family that had converted to Roman Catholicism. Amrouche emigrated with his family to Tunisia while still young. He was the older brother of fellow writer Taos Amrouche. Both were the children of Fadhma Aït Mansour, author of History of My Life.

Jean had his secondary education at Alaoui College and then left for the Ecole Normale Superieure de Saint-Cloud.

He taught French literature.

The poet Armand Guibert made him known in Tunisia by publishing his two collections of poems, Cendres (poems 1928–1934) in 1934 and Étoile secrète in 1937. He wrote at that time (poems, literary criticism) in Tunisian journals and gave lectures at the Cercle de l'Essor in Tunis. Some of his writing focused on his multifaceted cultural identity, using his first and middle names as symbols of the different aspects of his identity.

For several years with his friend Armand Guibert, he visited many countries in Europe.

He was strongly in favor of the Algerian independence movement.

In 1943, he joined the Ministry of Information in Algiers, then the Radiodiffusion Française.

He died on 16 April 1962 at his home in Paris; he is buried in Sargé-sur-Braye in Loir-et-Cher.

== Selected works ==
- Chants Berbères de Kabylie, 1939
- Etoile Secrète, 1937
- Cendres : poèmes, 1928–1934, 1934
