= Ouadhia District =

Coordinates: 36°33′N 4°05′E

- District
- Interactive map of Ouadhia District
- Country: Algeria
- Province: Tizi Ouzou Province
- Time zone: UTC+1 (CET)

Ouadhia District is a district of Tizi Ouzou Province, Algeria.

The district is further divided into four municipalities:

- Agouni Gueghrane
- Aït Bouaddou
- Tizi N'Tleta
- Ouadhia
