= Noura (singer) =

Algerian singer

- Noura, 1971
- Born: Fatima Zohra Badji; 26 April 1938; Cherchell, Algeria
- Died: 1 June 2014 (aged 76); Paris, France
- Other names: Arabic: فاطمة الزهراء باجي
- Occupation: singer
- Years active: 1950s-1980s
- Known for: first gold record by an Algerian singer
- Spouse: Kamel Hamadi

Fatima Zohra Badji (1942–2014) (Arabic: فاطمة الزهراء باجي) better known by her stage name of Noura (Arabic: نورة) was an Algerian singer. She was the first North African and Algerian to attain a gold record and was the first Algerian to appear on the front page of Paris Match. She received citations and awards from Tunisia, Libya and the Ministry of Culture of Algeria in recognition of her cultural contributions.

== Biography ==
Fatima Zohra Badji was born in 1942 in Sidi Amar, a small village near Cherchell, Algeria to a large family. As a shy child, she spent a lot of time listening to the radio and decided in the 1950s to ask for a job at a radio station. She was hired to host a children's program by station manager Saïd Rezzoug, who assigned her to work under the composer Amari Maâmar. Maâmar liked the sound of her voice and introduced her as a singer with the song "El Ouarda" written by Said Hayef.

== Career ==
She quickly became a star, the first with wide popularity in the country with a variety of themes, which touched on alienation, exile and love. She also performed in many genres including Andalusian classical music, chaabi, chaoui, Kabyle, Sahrawi, covering all types of regional folk music, singing in both Arabic and Kabyle. Some of her early hits included "Ghorba", "Gal-el menfi", and "Hua, hua" and she starred in the operetta أنا الورقة المسكينة (I am a poor leaf) written by Mustapha Kechkoul of Radio Algiers and composed by Mustapha Skandrani. Promoted by the artistic director of the Opéra d'Alger, Mohamed Jamoussi and the musician, Mahboob Bati, Noura soon became one of the most noted singers in Algeria.

In 1959, she met the songwriter Kamel Hamadi, while working at Radio Algiers, and they were married. Later that same year, she was invited to come to Paris and record a series of songs. She relocated with her husband, and the two of them worked together. He wrote a traditional-style song, "Ya Sidi rabi", which resonated with Algerian women for its theme of loss of their children because of emigration and intermarriage with foreigners. The song became a staple in her repertoire. Through Hamadi, Noura met the composer El Habib Hachelaf, with whom she also collaborated musically. She sang both alone and in duets with her husband and many of her songs focused on traditional themes such as marriage, children, neighborhood and God. In 1962, the couple returned to Algeria, but commuted back and forth between Paris and Algiers to record. In 1965, she released an album of his songs, all in French, including "Vie" by Michel Berger and "Paris dans mon sac" by her husband. Then in 1971, Noura recorded "يا ناس أماهو" (O People Omaho) and "باتي ماركوني" (Pathe Marconi) by Slimane Azem, which was awarded with a gold record for selling one million records in France. She was the first singer of Algerian origin to earn a gold record and appear on the front page of Paris Match. She recorded over 500 titles in Arabic, Kabyle and French. Some of her most noted songs were "Ya Rabbi Sidi", "Aïn El Karna", and "Adhrar njarjar eghlayene".

In 1974, she was awarded the Cultural Medal of the Republic of Tunisia by President Habib Bourguiba and the following year was selected as the star of the Arab Song Festival of Libya in 1975. Noura was honored in 2003 by the Algerian Ministry of Culture and Systems and then in 2012, the Office of Riad El-Feth under the direction of the Ministry of Culture honored her in a tribute for her cultural contributions.

== Death ==
Noura died on 1 June 2014 in Paris after a lengthy illness. On 3 June 2014 a ceremony attended by the Algerian ambassador to France, Amar Bendjama, was held in Paris before her body was transported to Algiers to be buried with her family in Sidi Yahia Cemetery.
