= L'opium et le bâton =

L'opium et le bâton is a 1965 novel by Algerian writer Mouloud Mammeri, who was born in Algeria and lived in Algeria, Morocco, and France. The novel was republished in Paris, in 1992, by Éditions La Découverte (ISBN 2-7071-2086-3. It is a realistic novel describing events of the Algerian War.

Ahmed Rachedi directed a movie based on the book, which was released in 1971.

== Critical studies ==
- Samson, Hervé (2013). Mouloud Mammeri: l'opium et le bâton. Étude critique. Paris: Honoré Champion.
