= Azzedine Mihoubi =

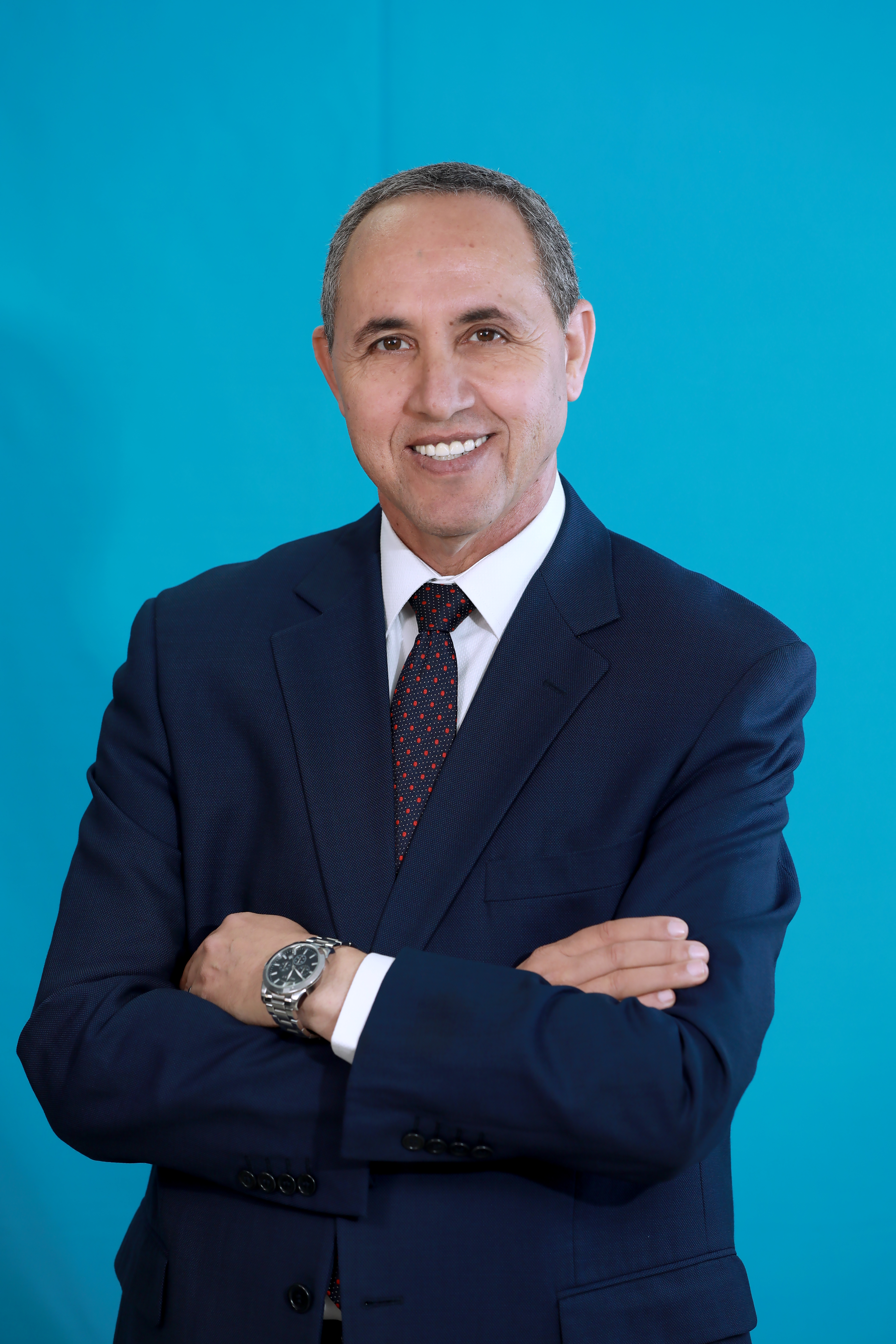
- Mihoubi in 2019
- Born: 1 January 1959 (age 67); Aïn Khadra
- Citizenship: Algeria
- Occupations: Politician, Poet, Writer, Journalist, Screenwriter

Azzedine Mihoubi (born 1 January 1959) is an Algerian political candidate and ex-journalist, poet, novelist. He served as the Algerian Minister of Culture.

== Early life ==
Azzedine Mihoubi was born on 1 January 1959, in Khadra, Algeria. He graduated from the École nationale d'administration d'Alger in 1984.

== Career ==
Mihoubi started his career as a journalist in 1986. He was the head of information for Algerian Television from 1996 to 1997. He served as the chief executive of the Algerian Radio from 2006 to 2008, and the National Library of Algeria from 2010 to 2013.

Mihoubi served as a member of the People's National Assembly from 1997 to 2002.

He also served as president of the Union of Algerian Writers from 1998 to 2005.

He ran as a candidate for the 2019 Algerian presidential election, but lost to Abdelmadjid Tebboune.

Mihoubi is the author of ten poetry collections and four novels. He is the recipient of several literary prizes for his poetry.

== Works ==
=== Poetry ===
- 1985 : Au début c’était les Aurès
- 1997 : Les Quatrains
- 1997 : Le Palmier et la Rame
- 1997 : Affiches
- 1997 : La Malédiction et le Pardon
- 2002 : Mondialisation de l’amour, mondialisation du feu,
- 2003 : Sacrifices pour un nouvel Aurore,
- 2006 : Tassilia
- 2007 : Exiles de l’âme
- 2008 : Asfar al malaika

=== Novels ===
- 1997 : Éternelles
- 1998 : A candle for my country
- 2000 : Caligula ne dessine pas Guernica Errais
- 2003 : Le Cercueil
- 2007 : Confessions de Tam City 2039
- 2009 : Confessions d’Assekrem
- 2013 : Irhabis
