= Tassadit Yacine =

Algerian anthropologist (born 1949)

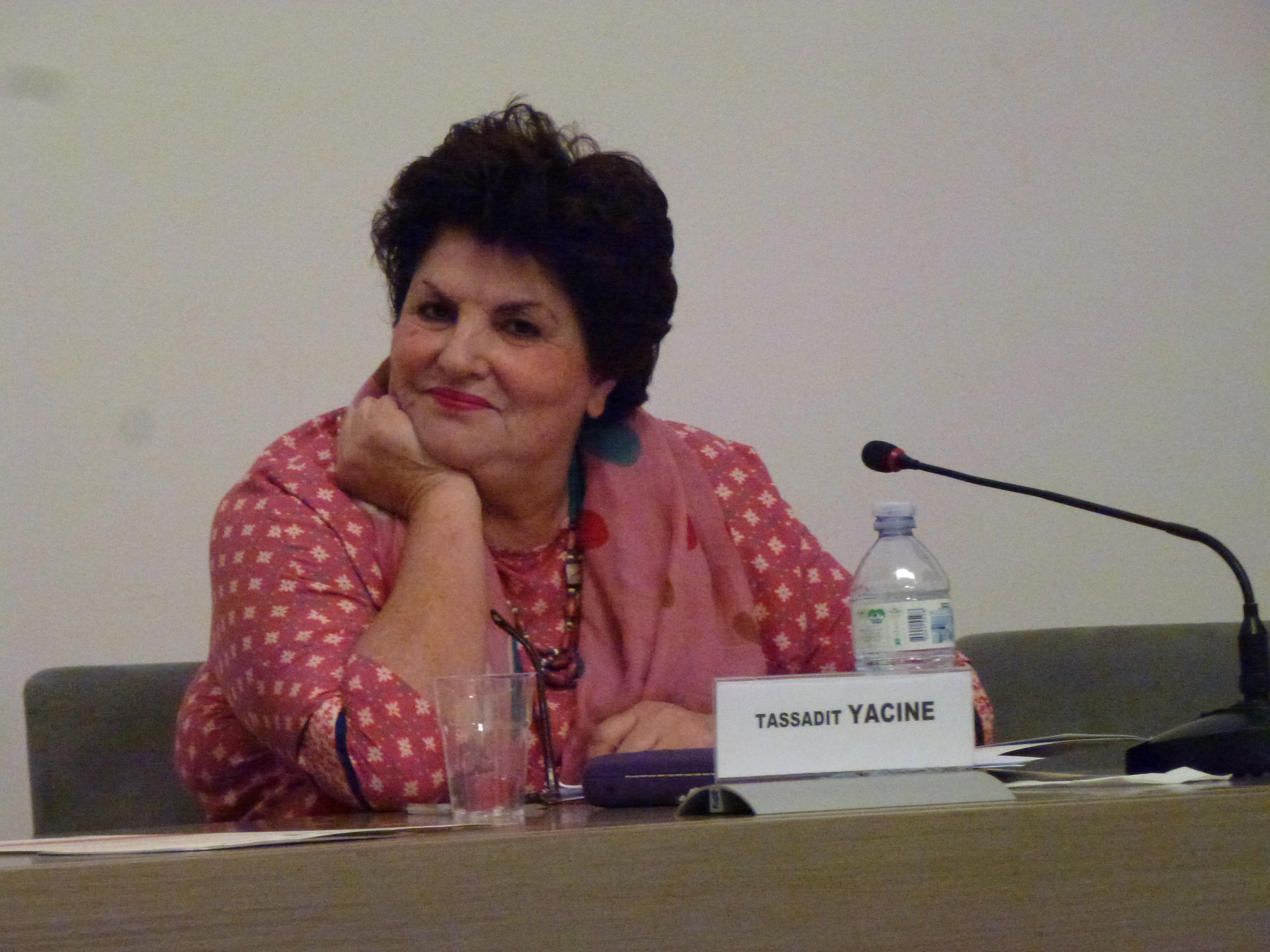
- Yacine speaking at a conference in 2015
- Born: November 14, 1949 (age 76); Boudjellil
- Occupation: Anthropologist

Academic background
- Thesis: Productions culturelles et agents de production en kabylie : anthropologie de la culture dans les groupes kabyles 16e-20e siecle
- Doctoral advisor: Mohammed Arkoun

Tassadit Yacine-Titouh (Kabyle: Taseɛdit Yasin-Tituḥ; born 11 November 1949 in Boudjellil, Algeria) is an Algerian anthropologist specialising in Berber culture.

== Early life ==
Yacine was born on 14 November 1949, in Boudjellil, in the wilaya Bejaia. Her mother was a housewife and her father an immigrant who was tortured and executed in 1956. She completed her primary, secondary and higher studies in Algeria, where she also worked before leaving for France in 1987.

== Career ==
Yacine is Director of Study at l'Ecole des Hautes Etudes en Sciences Sociales (EHESS) and is also a member of the department of social anthropology at the Collège de France. She directs Awal ("The word") - a journal founded in 1985 in Paris with the Algerian anthropologist Mouloud Mammeri and the sociologist Pierre Bourdieu to explore Berber life.

Yacine's doctoral thesis was entitled Productions culturelles et agents de production en kabylie: anthropologie de la culture dans les groupes kabyles 16e-20e siecle, which she was awarded a PhD for in 1992 from Paris-Sorbonne University. Her first degree was in Spanish at the University of Algiers; she graduated for it in 1980.

In February 2023, Tassadit Yacine officially joins the Ambrosian Academy Center for Italian Studies and Culture aims to promote intercultural exchange. In particular, thanks to international conferences and publications which aim to create an international scientific community.

== Research ==
Yacine has written widely on Berber anthropology Her approach to social anthropology combines scientific assessment with oral literature. She is an expert on the work of Bourdieu, placing his experiences in Algeria as a central influence on his philosophy. She edited the diaries of Jean Amrouche, enabling greater understanding of his influence on literature. She led the colloquium following the death of Rabah Belamri, which re-examined, as well as playing tribute to, his role in literary culture in the Maghreb. She edited a collection of Bourdieu's writings, where Yacine placed his work in its Algerian political contexts.

She is an expert on the life of Berber peoples and has published and spoken widely on the subject, especially how Arabic culture and language has eroded Amazigh identities over the course of the twentieth century. Yacine has studied kabyle language and Berber literary cultures in particular. She is also an authority on how gender intersects with the erosion of cultural identities in Amazigh culture, using a Freudian framework for cultural analysis. This work was built on in a subsequent thesis by Terhi Lehtinen. Two of her most significant academic works are seen to be: Chacal ou la ruse des dominés (2001) and Si tu m'aimes, guéris-moi (2006). In the latter book, Yacine places Berber culture in its wider Mediterranean context, as well as transcending the traditional distinction between oral and written cultures.

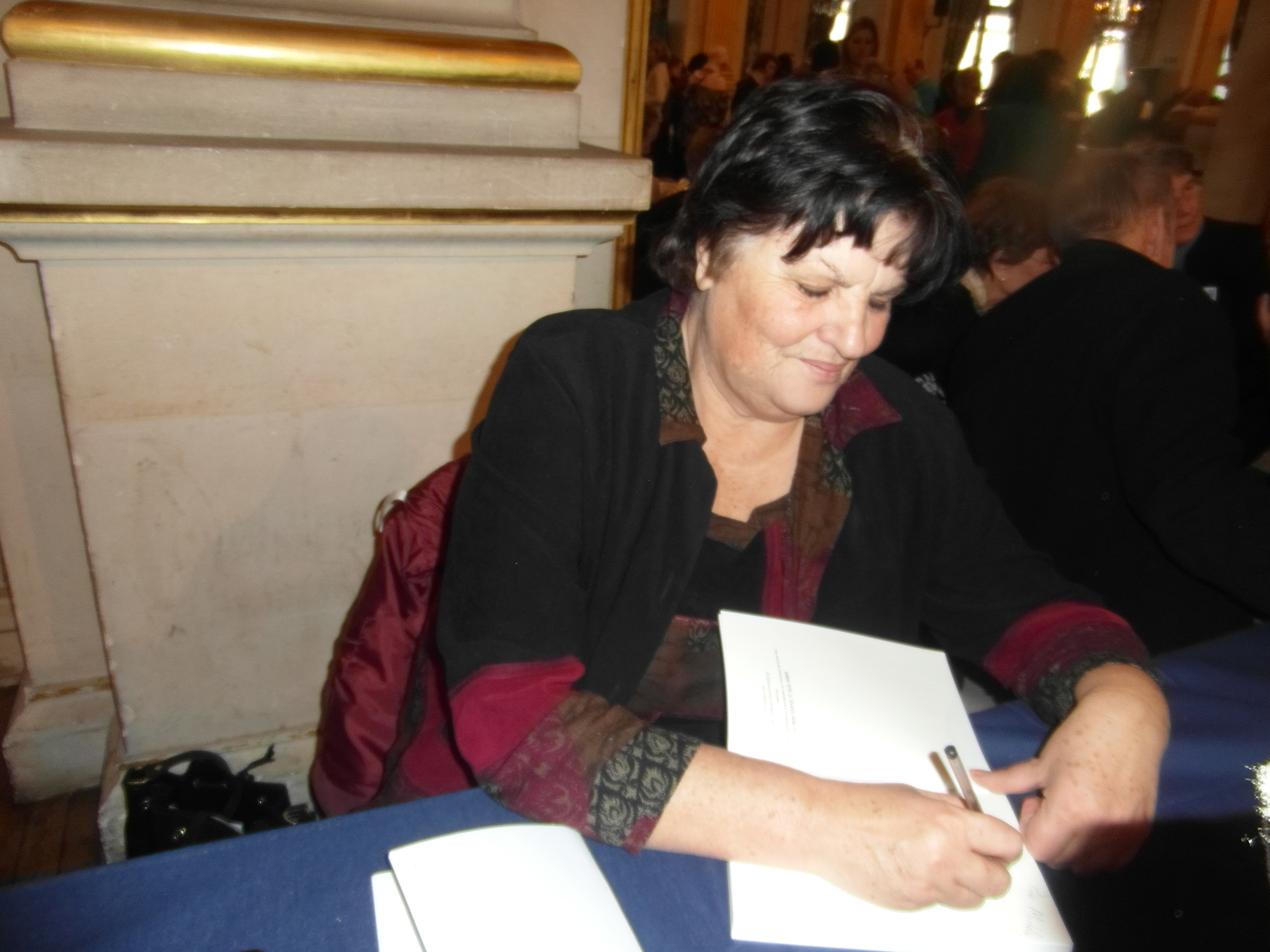
Tassadit Yacine (21e Maghreb des Livres, Paris, 7 et 8 février 2015)

=== Monographs ===
- 1987 - L'izli ou l'amour chanté en kabyle, Préface de Pierre Bourdieu, Paris, MSH - (ISBN 273510253X).
- 1989 - Aït Menguellet chante... Chansons berbères contemporaines, Paris, La Découverte - (ISBN 2707118877). Préface de Kateb Yacine.
- 1992 - Les Kabyles. Éléments pour la compréhension de l'identité berbère en Algérie, Paris, GDM - (ISBN 2-906589-13-6).
- 1992 - Amour, phantasmes et sociétés en Afrique du Nord et au Sahara, Paris, L'Harmattan - (ISBN 2738417620).
- 1993 - Les voleurs de feu, Paris, La Découverte - (ISBN 2707122890).
- 1995 - Chérif Kheddam ou l'amour de l'art, Paris, La Découverte- (ISBN 2707124192).
- 1995 – Piège ou le combat d'une femme algérienne: Essai d'anthropologie de la souffrance, Paris, Awal/Publisud - (ISBN 2866007581).
- 1996 – Nuara. Quaderno poetico di una donna cabila (éd. italienne par les soins de Domenico Canciani), Edizioni Lavoro - (ISBN 978-8879107181).
- 2001 - Chacal ou la ruse des dominés, Paris, La Découverte - (ISBN 2707133957).
- 2003 - Jean Amrouche, l'éternel exilé. Antologia di testi (1939 - 1950), Parigi, Éditions Awal-IBIS Press - (ISBN 2910728250).
- 2006 - Si tu m'aimes, guéris moi: études d'ethnologie des affects en Kabylie, Paris, Maison des sciences de l'homme - (ISBN 2735110869).
- 2008 - Pierre Bourdieu, Esquisses algériennes, textes édités et présentés par Tassadit Yacine, Paris, Seuil - (ISBN 978-2020982863).
- 2009 - Jean El Mouhoub Amrouche, Journal (1928-1962), texte édité par Tassadit Yacine Titouh, Paris, Non Lieu - (ISBN 978-2352700562).
- 2011 - Le retour de Jugurtha. Amrouche dans la lutte : du racisme de la colonisation, Tizi Ouzou, Passerelles Éditions - (ISBN 9789931905103).
- 2017 - Souviens-toi ramier... Contes d'amour kabyles, Non Lieu - (ISBN 978-2-35270-248-1).

A full bibliography of Yacine's publications can be found on the EHESS site.
