= Union of Algerian Writers =

- اتحاد الكتاب الجزائريين
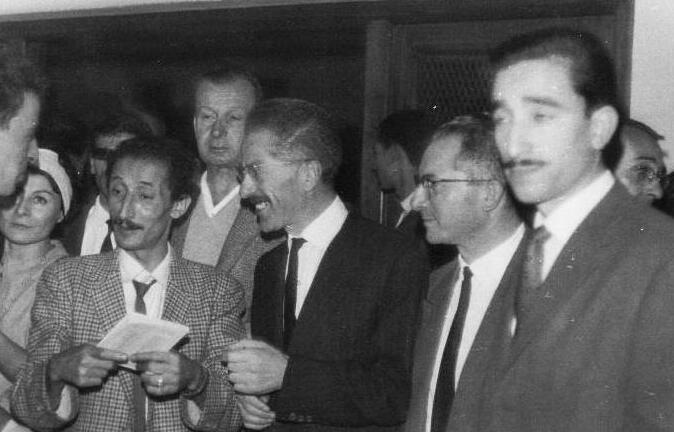
- Kaddour M'Hamsadji with Mouloud Mammeri (archival photo)
- Formation: October 28, 1963
- Type: Cultural association
- Headquarters: 88 Didouche-Mourad Street, Algiers
- Official language: Arabic, French, Tamazight
- President: Youcef Chagra

The Union of Algerian Writers (Arabic: اتحاد الكتاب الجزائريين) is a professional and cultural association established in the early years following the independence of Algeria to bring together and support Algerian writers, promote literary creation, and organize national cultural life. It is historically linked to the magazine Novembre, which served as the Union's editorial organ in the 1960s.

== History ==
The Union was established on 28 October 1963 during an assembly that gathered writers from various ideological backgrounds. Among the founding members were Mouloud Mammeri, Jean Sénac, Kaddour M'Hamsadji, and other literary figures of the time.

The magazine Novembre, launched in the mid-1960s, was one of the editorial organs associated with the first Union and reflected the literary and cultural debates of that era.

== Activities and events ==
The UEA organizes colloquia, literary seasons, tributes, and meetings. For example, in 2024, it hosted a solidarity meeting with the Palestinian people at its headquarters, attended by intellectuals and international representatives.

The Union collaborates with publishing houses, universities, and cultural organizations (book fairs, festivals) to promote Algerian literary creation.

== Publications ==
- Novembre — a magazine associated with the early years of the Union (1964–1965); a primary source for the literary debates of the period.
- The Union contributed to collective editions and bibliographic catalogues (listed in national libraries).
- Several academic studies analyze the UEA and Algerian literary life after independence, including monographs, book chapters, and journal articles (notably in Cairn and university journals). Examples include studies on writers of the "Black Decade", works on Jean Sénac and Mouloud Mammeri, and analyses of literary journals of the era.

== Presidents ==
- Mouloud Mammeri — founding figure and one of the key initiators of the Union in 1963.
- Jean Sénac — General Secretary during the 1960s; central figure in the Union's early years and a leading contributor to Novembre.
- Cheikh Bouamrane — President of the Union (1995–1996).
- Azzedine Mihoubi — President (1998–2005); former Minister of Culture and Director of the National Library.
- Youcef Chagra — President (2023–2025), cited in recent press coverage of Union activities.

== Gallery ==
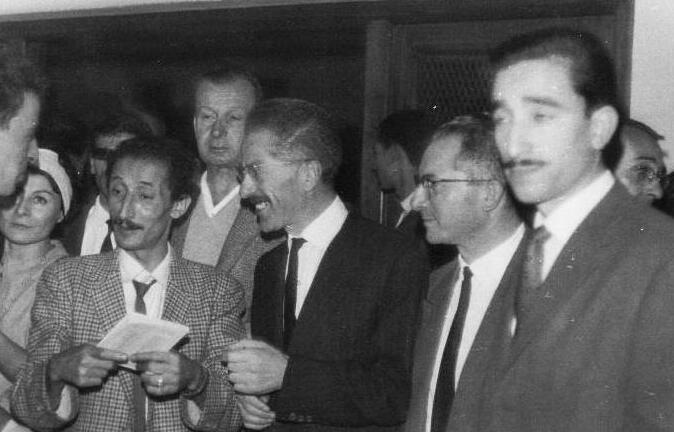
Kaddour M'Hamsadji with Mouloud Mammeri (archival photo)

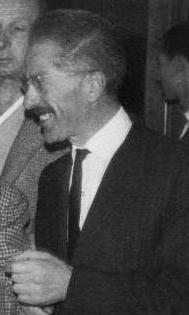
Portrait of Mouloud Mammeri

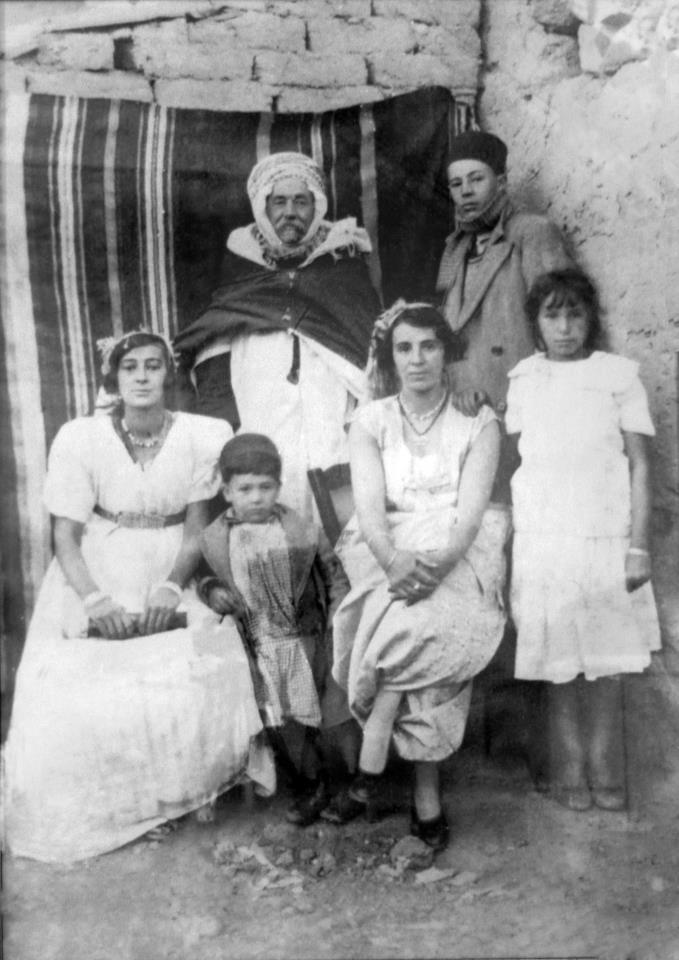
Photo of Kateb Yacine (family)

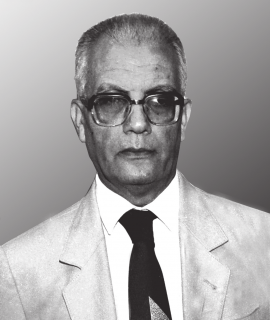
Portrait of Cheikh Bouamrane
