= Taos Amrouche =

Algerian writer and singer (1913–1976)

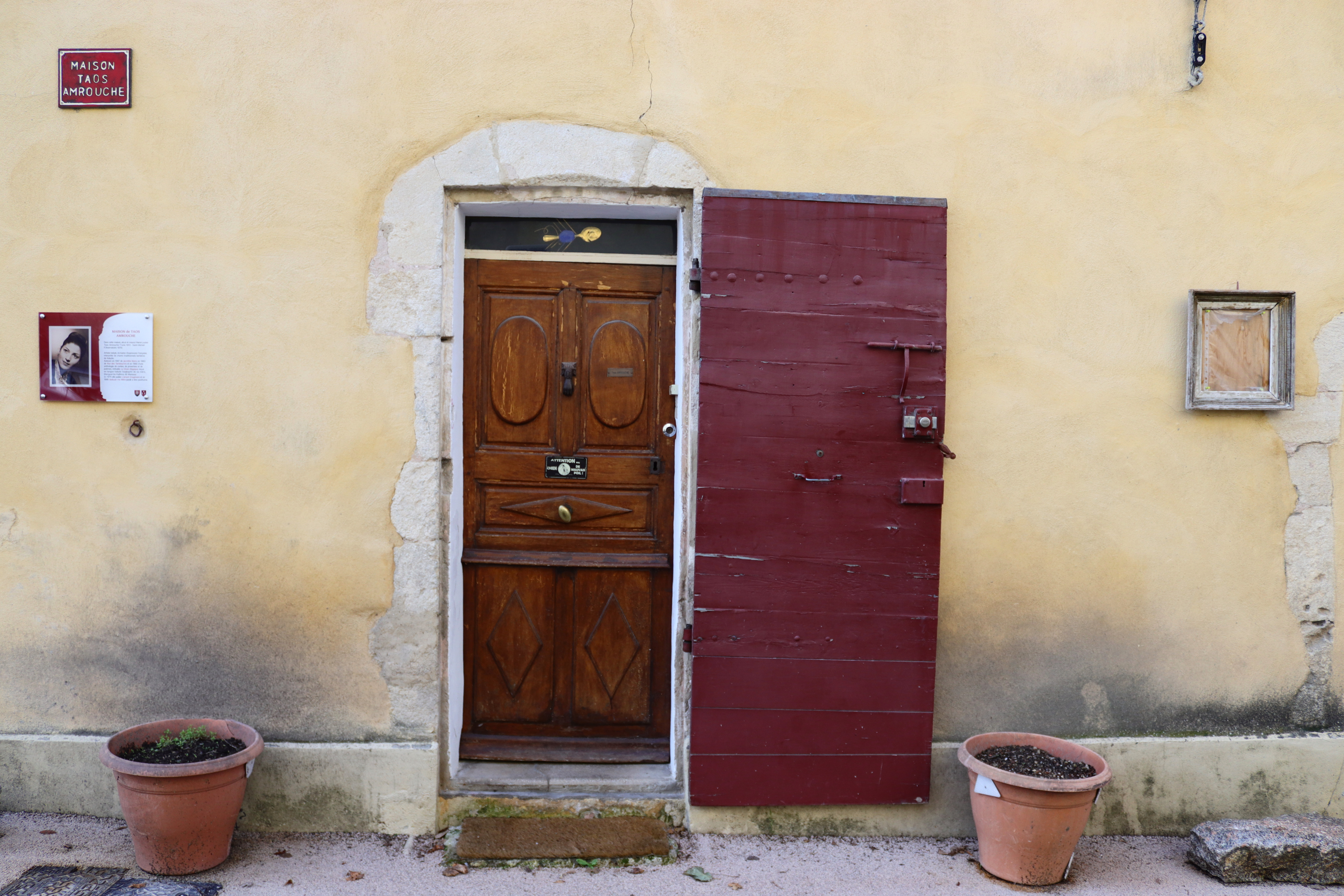
- Taos Amrouche's house in Saint-Michel-l'Observatoire, France

Background information
- Also known as: Marie-Louise-Taos Amrouche
- Born: 4 March 1913; Tunis, French Tunisia
- Died: 2 April 1976 (aged 63) Saint-Michel-l'Observatoire, France
- Genre: Kabyle
- Occupations: Singer, writer
- Instrument: vocals
- Years active: 1967–1976

Marie-Louise-Taos Amrouche (Tamazight: Mari-Lwiz Ṭawes Ɛemruc, March 1913 – 2 April 1976) was a Kabyle writer and singer. In 1947, she became the first Kabyle woman to publish a novel.

== Biography ==
She was born in Tunis, Tunisia, into a family of Kabyle Roman Catholic converts, the only daughter in a family of six sons. Her family had moved to Tunisia to escape persecution after their conversion in Algeria.

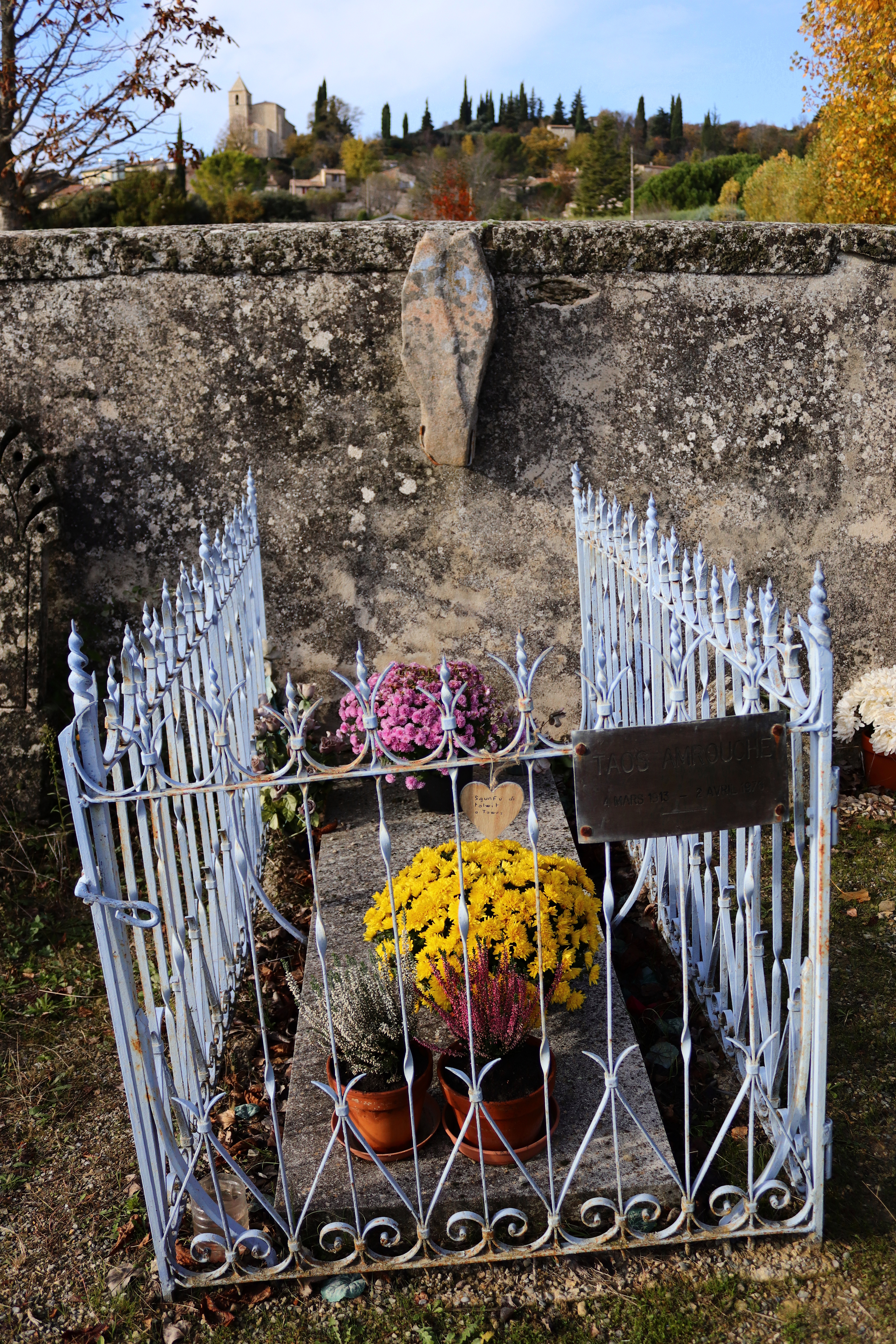
The grave of Taos Amrouche in the Cemetery, Saint-Michel l'Observatoire.

Her mother Fadhma Aït Mansour, who was a famous Kabyle singer, had a great impact on her life, and her literary style would reflect the oral traditions of the Kabylie Berber people of her mother's heritage. Amrouche received her elementary and secondary education in Tunis, and in 1935 went to France for studies at the École Normale at Sèvres. From 1936, in collaboration with her elder brother Jean Amrouche and her mother, Amrouche collected and began to interpret Kabyle songs. In 1939, at the Congrès de Chant de Fès, she received a scholarship to study at the Casa Velasquez in Spain, where she researched the ties between Berber and Spanish popular songs.

Her autobiographical first novel, Jacinthe noir, was published in 1947 and is one of the earliest ever published in French by a North African woman writer. With her compilation of tales and poems La Grain magique in 1966, she took the nom de plume Marguerite-Taos, Marguerite being her mother's Christian name.

While she wrote in French, she sang in Kabyle. Her first album Chants berbères de Kabylie (1967), which was a great success, was a collection of traditional Kabyle songs that had been translated into French by her brother Jean. She recorded several other albums, including Chants sauvés de l’oubli ("Songs Saved from Oblivion"), Hommage au chant profond ("Homage to a Profound Song"), Incantations, méditations et danses sacrées berbères (1974), and Chants berbères de la meule et du berceau (1975).

She was an activist in Berber issues and was among the founders of Académie berbère in 1966.

She died in Saint-Michel-l'Observatoire in France.

== Bibliography ==
- Jacinthe noire (1947) – reprint Joëlle Losfeld (1996), ISBN 2-909906-63-9
- La Grain magique (1966) – reprint La Découverte (2000), ISBN 2-7071-2578-4
- Rue des tambourins (1969) – reprint Joëlle Losfeld (1996), ISBN 2-909906-62-0
- L’Amant imaginaire (1975)

== Selected discography ==
- Chants berbères de Kabylie (1967)
- Chants De L'Atlas (Traditions Millénaires Des Berbères D'Algérie) (1970)
- Incantations, méditations et danses sacrées berbères (1974)
- Chants berbères de la meule et du berceau (1975)
- Au Théatre De La Ville (1977)
