= Si Mohand =

Berber poet

Si Mohand ou-Mhand
- Muḥend U Mḥend
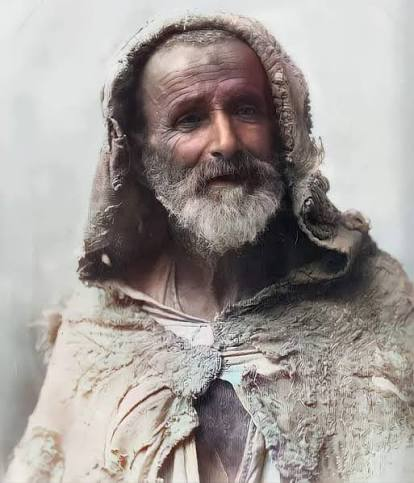
- A colourized photograph of Si Mohand
- Born: November 1848; Icheraiouen
- Died: 28 December 1906 (aged 58); Michelet, French Algeria
- Other name: Kabyle Verlaine
- Occupations: Poet, philosopher
- Style: Asefru

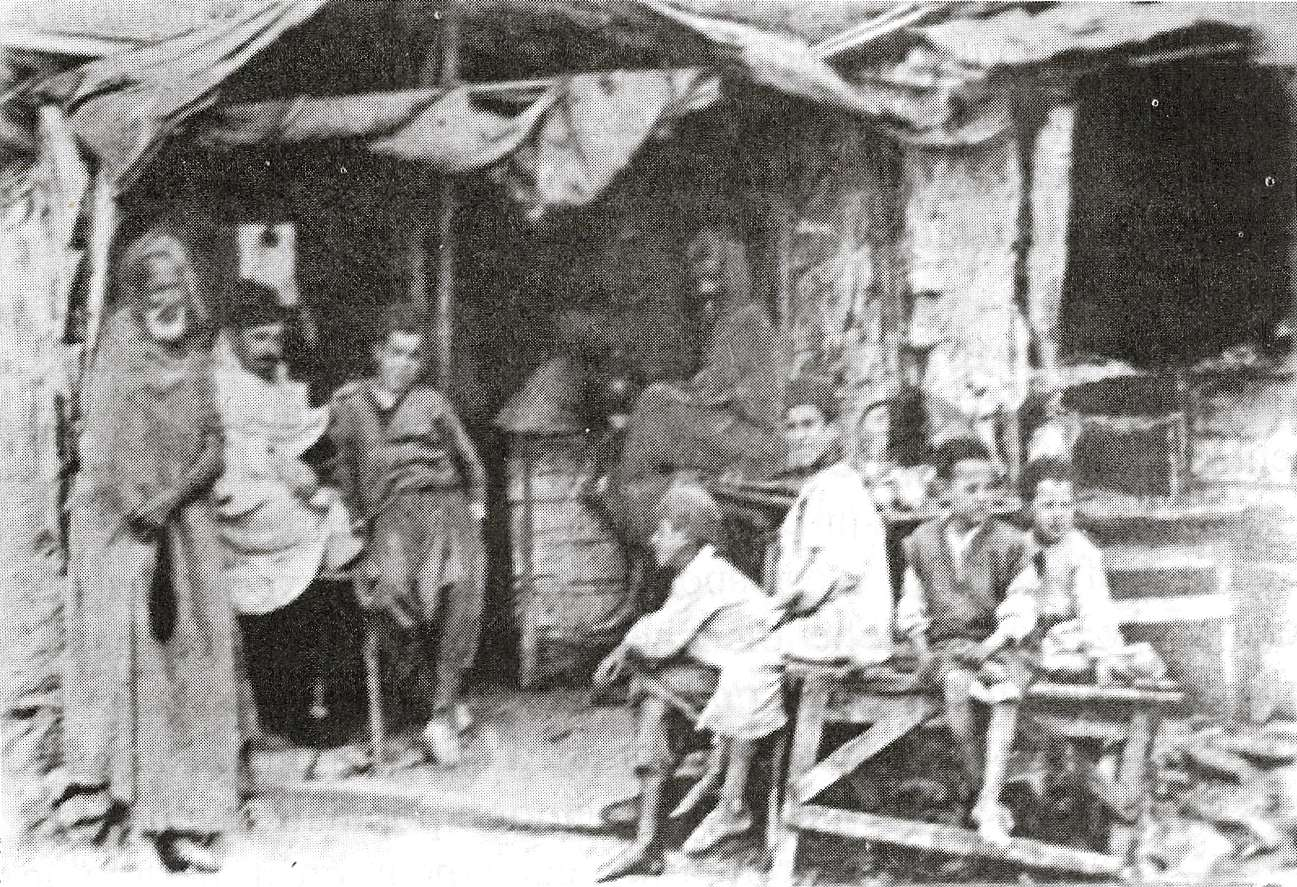

Si Mohand ou-Mhand n At Hmadouch (Kabyle: Si Muḥend U Mḥend n At Ḥmaduc), also known as Si Mhand, (Icerɛiwen, Tizi Rached, about 1848 – Ain El Hammam, 28 December 1905) was a widely known Berber poet from Kabylie in Algeria. Called the "Kabyle Verlaine" by French scholars, his works were translated by fellow Algerians Mouloud Feraoun, Mouloud Mammeri and Boulifa and one of the translations was Les poémes de Si-Mohand (1960). Due to difference of information and sources, some details of his life are not clearly known.

== Biography ==
Born into an important wealthy family and educated in traditional religious teaching (hence the title Si, "Doctor", which is added to his name), his life was marked by the strong repression which followed the Mokrani Revolt against French colonial rule in 1871. He lost everything. His father was sentenced to death, his paternal uncle was sent into exile in New Caledonia, and his family's possessions were forfeited. Unlike his mother and his brothers, who emigrated to Tunis, he preferred to stay and live in Algeria as one of the dispossessed, working as a day laborer or practicing other poorly paid jobs. He never settled anywhere, but wandered all his life in Algiers or in other Algerian towns and villages inside and around Kabylie. Few details of his life are known for certain. The tradition remembers a visit he paid to the pious Cheikh Mohand ou-Lhocine, with whom he fought an epic poetic duel, as well as a journey on foot to Tunis, where he met his brothers but was not well received.

He died of tuberculosis at 57 at the Sainte-Eugénie hospital in Michelet (now Ain El Hammam). He also chronicled in Younes Adli's 2000 Les Éditions de Minuit-published book Mohand et un révolte.

== Works ==
In the course of his wandering life he composed a great number of isefra or poems in Berber. Some hundreds survived by oral transmission and have been recorded in books by Boulifa, Mouloud Feraoun, Mouloud Mammeri and Younes Adli.

- Poésies populaires de la Kabylie du Djurdjura, M. Hanoteau, Paris, 1867
- Recueil de poésies kabyles, Saïd Boulifa, Alger, Jordan, 1904
- El jardín de los deseos. Poesías berberiscas de Sid Mojand, Traducción y notas de Isaac Muñoz [Edición bilingüe con transcripción fonética del bereber], Madrid, Renacimiento, 1914
- La Poésie kabyle de Si Mohand-ou-M’hand et les Isefra, Emile Dermenghem, Documents Alger, Séries-culturelles, n°57, 1951.
- Les Poèmes de Si Mohand, Mouloud Feraoun, Paris, Edition de Minuit, 1960.
- Les Isefra de Si Mohand, Mouloud Mammeri, Maspero, 1982.
- Si Mohand ou Mhand. Errance et révolte, Younes Adli, Paris Mediterranee, ISBN 2-84272-110-1, 2001.

Thikkelt-a ad hedjigh asefru
Wallah ad yelhu
Ad inadi deg lwedyat.

Wi t-islan ard a t-yaru
Ur as-iberru
W' illan d elfahem yezra-t :

A nhell Rebbi a tent-yehdu
Ghur-es ay nedâu
Ad baâdent adrim nekfa-t.

This time I'll compose a poem;
Please God it be beautiful
And spread everywhere.

Who will hear it will write it,
Will not part with it
And the wise will understand it:

May God inspire pity in them;
Only he can preserve us:
Women should forget us, we have no money left!
