= Saïd Cid Kaoui =

Algerian berberologist/lexicographer

- Born: Saïd ben Mohammed-Akli; March 12, 1859; Ahammam, Bejaia, Algeria
- Died: December 15, 1910 (aged 51); Bordj Menaïel, Algeria
- Occupation(s): Berberologist, Lexicographer
- Spouse: Léonie Richebois
- Children: Léon; Marguerite; Baya-Lucie

Saïd Cid Kaoui (born as Saïd ben Mohammed-Akli; 12 March 1859 – 15 December 1910) was an Algerian berberologist and lexicographer.

== Biography ==
Saïd was born on March 12, 1859, in Ahammam, village of the tribe of Oulad Abd el Djebar and located in the wilaya of Bejaia near Oued Amizour. His mother, Cherifa bent Saïd ben Ahmed was born in this same place, in the village of Taourirt.

His father, Mohammed Akli (Muḥend Akli), was from the Beni Sedka (Kabyle: At Sedqa), a tribe of Djurdjura, and settled in this area of the Oued Sahel after the conquest of Kabylia by the French army in 1856-57. A scholar in Arabic, it is certain, who must have belonged to the Marabout caste. An extract of a judicial act dated April 9, 1887, where he mentioned: "from Young Si Essaïd (reads Si Saïd), son of the late Mohammed Akli Cid Kaoui". It is known that the title "Si" is reserved exclusively in these regions to marabouts and exceptionally to men versed in "religious science". In Muslim literary circles, Mohammed Akli had to call himself Muḥammad 'Akli as-Sadqawi, and this nisba served as a patronymic name for his son when the latter, still young, wore the military uniform. He, indeed, joined the spahis under this surname but with the spelling "Cid Kaoui".

Little is known about his childhood and the early years of his youth. He attended, like the few natives of his rank, the French primary school of Bougie, parallel to studying and reading Quran in the traditional neighborhood school, before entering lycée franco-arabe of Constantine, where he received a solid education in French and Arabic. This will open to him, later, the doors of Military interpretation.

Before joining the Military interpretation; at the age of 18, he enlisted in the Spahis as a volunteer for a period of four years, with the rank of brigadier, then Maréchal des logis. He was relieved of his duties on March 5, 1881, and obtained a supervisory position at the Algiers High School, before returning to the 1st Regiment of Spahis on July 13, 1882, for four more years. Towards the beginning of 1880, he enrolled at University of Algiers, in medicine, the studies he pursued for two years before opting for an interpreter course. Then, having passed his exams successfully, he was recruited on 26 September 1886 in the body of military interpreters.

In 1889, he married Léonie Richebois, a Frenchwoman from Algeria, born in 1868 in L’Arba in the Mitidja. Saïd obtained his naturalization by decree of 27 January 1890. He had three children from this marriage: Léon, born in Ghardaïa in 1890, Marguerite, born in Dellys in 1892 and Baya-Lucie, born in 1904.

He died on December 15, 1910, in Bordj Menaïel where he settled down with his family.

== Works ==
- Dictionnaire français-tamâhaq. Alger. 1894.
- Dictionnaire pratique tamâhaq-français. 1900.
- Dictionnaire français-tachelh'it et tamazir't (dialectes berbères du Maroc). Paris: E. Leroux. 1907.

== Recognition ==
He was honored with several high distinctions:

In 1895, Officer of Nichan Iftikhar.

He received, during his stay in Paris, a bronze medal at the Exposition Universelle (1900) crowning his two Tuareg dictionaries.

In 1904, Chevalier of the Legion of Honor.

In 1905, Officier d’Académie.
