= Mohand Tazerout =

Algerian philosopher and translator

Mohand Tazerout (1893 in Aghrib – 1973 in Tangier) was an Algerian philosopher, writer, translator and Algerian civilizationist. He translated several works of German philosophers including The Decline of the West by Oswald Spengler in 1931, and wrote many books, including several commentaries on Soviet communism (La Métaphysique intellectuelle - 1955), and a political history of northern Africa (Histoire politique de l'Afrique du Nord - 1961).

Born in the Kabylia region, he studied at Bouzaréa in Algiers, and was appointed to a school in Thénia. In 1912, he rebelled against the director and left Algeria for Cairo. In 1913, he moved to Iran where he learned Persian. He subsequently moved to Russia and then China around 1914, picking up the local languages. Tazerout then visited Europe, and was recruited in Belgium for service in 1917 during World War I. He later studied at Poitiers and Strasbourg. He spent much of his last 20 years back in Algeria, before dying in Tangier in 1973.
