= Ighil Ali =

Ighil Ali Iɣil Ɛli (Kabyle)
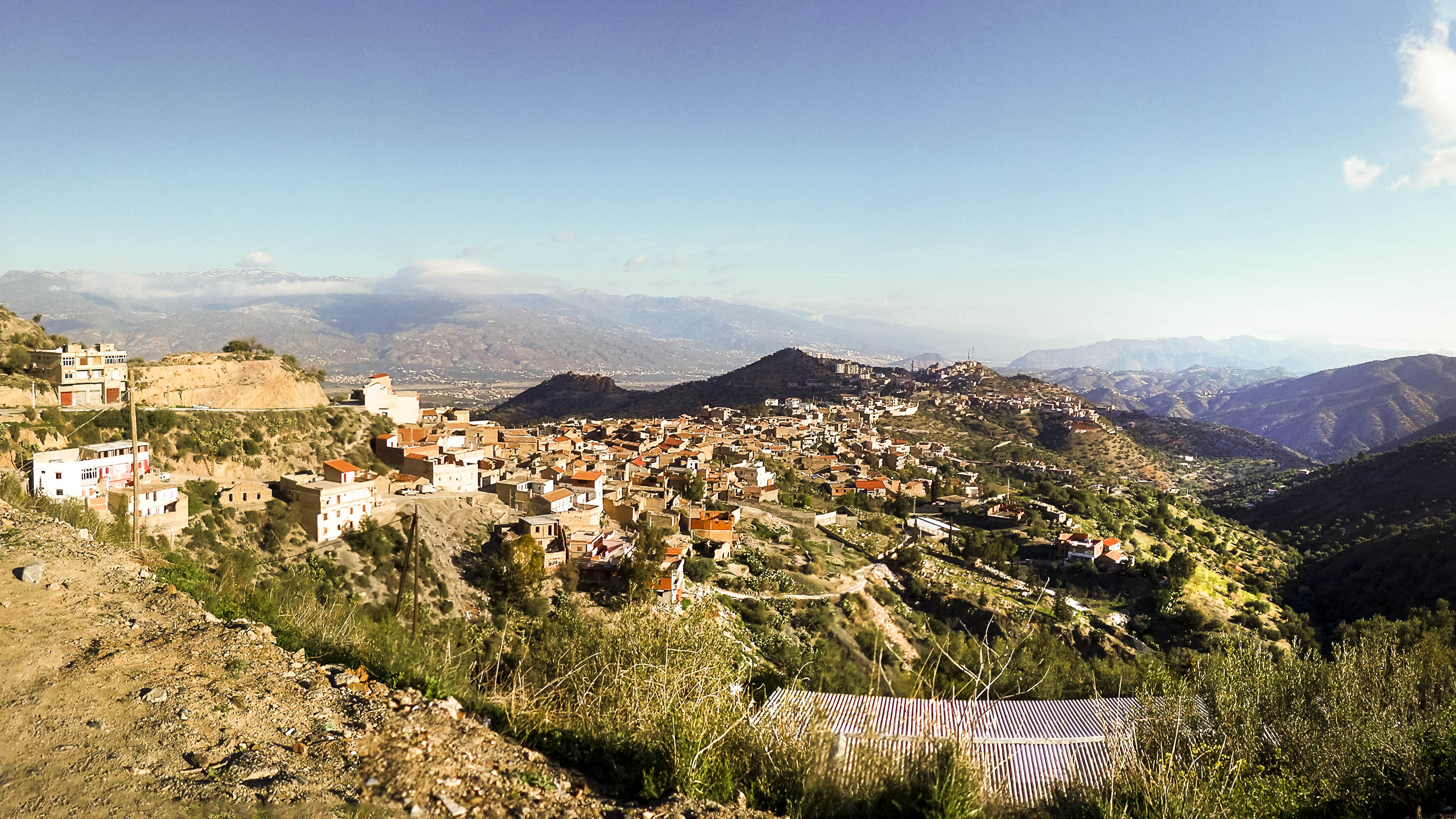

- Location within Algeria
- Coordinates: 36°20′15″N 4°28′13″E
- Country: Algeria
- Province: Bejaia
- Time zone: UTC+1 (West Africa Time)

Ighil Ali (Kabyle: Iɣil Ɛli) is a commune in northern Algeria in the Béjaïa Province.

== Notable people ==
- Mouloud Kacem Naît Belkacem (1927-1992), politician and philosopher
- Jean Amrouche (1906-1962), writer, poet and journalist
