= Meziane Idjerouidene =

- Born: 13 June 1980 (age 46); Paris
- Citizenship: France
- Occupation: CEO of Weaving Group
- Parent: Arezki Idjerouidene

Meziane Idjerouidene (born in Paris) is a French aviation executive. Since 2008 he has served as managing director of French domestic airline Aigle Azur, owned and led by his father.

Under his management, Aigle Azur sold the last Boeing 737 aircraft of the fleet and keeps only an Airbus fleet, focusing on Maghreb, Africa and Middle East routes (Orly to Algiers in 2003, to Tunis in 2005, to Portugal in 2006 and to Mali in 2007), with passengers announcements made not only in French and English, but also in a third language, such as Arabic, Bambara, Berber, Portuguese or Soninke.

With a scientific baccalauréat, Idjerouidène is a graduate from Toulouse Business School and École nationale de l'aviation civile (Mastère Spécialisé in air transport management). As the son of the airline's owner, he spent summer holidays doing part-time jobs in the family business.

Méziane Idjerouidène is also board member of ENAC Alumni.
