= Mouloud Kacem Naît Belkacem =

Algerian politician, historian and writer (1927–1992)

Mouloud Kacem Naît Belkacem

Mouloud Kacem Naît Belkacem (Arabic: مولود قاسم نايت بلقاسم 6 January 1927 in Belaâyane, Ighil Ali - 27 August 1992) was an Algerian politician, philosopher, historian, and writer. He was a noted defender of the Arabic language, Islam and Algerian nationalism, and stressed the importance of Arabic identity in the world.

He studied in Tunis and Cairo, where he obtained a degree in philosophy. He then attended Sorbonne, and was a member of the Arabic academies in Jordan, Egypt and Syria, before he joined the Algerian revolution in 1954. In the 1970s, he held various government posts, including Minister of Habous in 1970, Minister of Religious Affairs and Endowments from 1970 to 1977, and Minister to the President of the Republic, in charge of religious affairs from 1977 to 1979. He was also in charge of High Council of the Arabic language.
