= Boulifa =

- Aɛmer U Sɛid
- Born: 1865; Irdjen, Tizi Ouzou, Algeria
- Died: 8 June 1931 (aged 65–66); Algiers
- Resting place: cemetery of Bab-el-Oued
- Occupation: Berberologist

Si Amar U Said Boulifa (Kabyle: Si Aɛmer U Sɛid n At Belqasem U Aεmer, c. 1865 – 8 June 1931) was an Kabyle Berberologist and teacher establishing formal teaching methods for the Berber language and preserving oral literature.

== Biography ==
Boulifa was born around 1865 in Adni village in the Irjen tribe, within the Kabyle tribal confederation of At Iraten in Greater Kabylia. His family, the Aït Belkacem ou Amar (Kabyle: At Belqasem U Aεmer), are a modest marabout family (hence the "Si" of his name). Boulifa is his patronymic name in the French Civil Register. His father, Amar, left him an orphan very young. But, lucky enough to be related by his mother to the At Ameur, Tamazirt's powerful family of Caids. Si Moula, his maternal uncle, thus sent him to the first arabic-french school opened in Kabylia (at Tamazirt, in 1873), for which candidates were then rare. This combination of circumstances will be decisive for the rest of his life since he quickly committed to the career of teacher, the only way of promotion that could then be offered to a young Kabyle of modest origin.

After some years, he was appointed as moniteur adjoint at Tamazirt. From 1890, he started instructing Kabyle lessons at the École Normale Supérieure de Bouzaréah, then after an internship in 1895 at the same institution he became an instituteur adjoint. In 1901, he was appointed as a répétiteur of kabyle at the School of Letters of Algiers. In late 1904, he took part in the Segonzac mission in Morocco from where he brought back his Textes berbères de l’Atlas. In 1905, he participated in the 14th International Congress of Orientalists in Algiers with a communication on the Qanun of Adni.

In his will, dated 20 October 1914, Boulifa presents himself as a "professor of Berber" at the École Normale and the Faculty of Letters of Algiers, which suggests that he was able to reach the rank of Lecturer of the University. He retired in 1929 and died on 8 June 1931 in Mustapha Pacha hospital in Algiers. He is buried in the cemetery of Bab-el-Oued in Algiers.

== Influence on Kabyle pedagogy ==
He was mainly interested in the language, but he has also been actively studying the literature and history of his home region. And he took his pedagogical function very seriously as he developed the first complete teaching method of Kabyle, founded, several decades in advance, on the principles of the direct language pedagogy. Prior to Boulifa, there were only very classical descriptive grammars, with a limited pedagogical programme.

== Works ==
- Une première année de langue kabyle (dialecte zouaoua). A l'usage des candidats à la prime et au brevet de kabyle (in French) (2nd ed.). Algiers: A. Jourdan. 1910 [1897].
- Recueil de poésies kabyles (texte zouaoua), précédé d'une étude sur la femme kabyle et d'une notice sur le chant kabyle (airs de musique) (2nd ed.). Algiers: A. Jourdan. 1910 [1904].
- Méthode de langue kabyle (cours de deuxième année). Étude linguistique, sociologique sur la Kabylie du Djurdjura. Texte zouaoua, suivi d'un glossaire. Algiers: Jourdan. 1913.
- Textes berbères en dialecte de l'Atlas marocain. Paris: Leroux. 1908.
- Le Djurdjura à travers l'histoire (depuis l'Antiquité jusqu'à 1830): Organisation et indépendance des Zouaoua (Grande Kabylie). Algiers: Bringau. 1925.

== Sources ==
- Chaker, Salem (1991). "Boulifa". In Camps, Gabriel (ed.). Encyclopédie berbère. Vol. 10 | Beni Isguen – Bouzeis. Aix-en-Provence: Edisud. ISBN 9782857445494.
- Pouillon, François (2012). Dictionnaire des orientalistes de langue française (in French). Karthala. ISBN 9782811107901.
- Selles-Lefranc, Michèle (2006). "Le Djurdjura à travers l'histoire (1925) : histoire modèle d'une du monde berbère » ou exemple d'une construction autochtone de savoirs à l'Ecole des Lettres d'Alger ?". Outre-Mers. Revue d'histoire. 93 (352): 79–96. doi:10.3406/outre.2006.4225.
