= Mouloud Mammeri =

Algerian writer, anthropologist and linguist

- Mouloud Mammeri
- Born: December 28, 1917; Ait Yanni, Algeria
- Died: February 26, 1989 (aged 71); Aïn Defla, Algeria
- Occupations: Writer, Linguist, Researcher
- Writing career
- Language: Tamazight, French
- Period: 1940s to 1980s
- Notable works: Tajeṛṛumt n Tmaziɣt; Amawal Tamazight-Tafransist

Signature
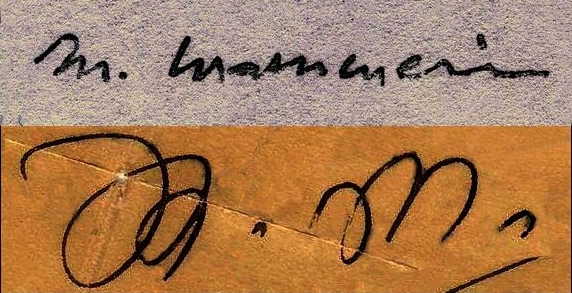

Mouloud Mammeri (Tamazight: Mulud At Mɛammer) was an Algerian writer, anthropologist and linguist.

== Biography ==
He was born on December 28, 1917, in Ait Yenni, in Tizi Ouzou Province, French Algeria. He attended a primary school in his native village, then emigrated to Morocco to live in his uncle's house in Rabat. Four years later he returned to Algiers and pursued his studies at Bugeaud College, before continuing his education at Lycée Louis-le-Grand in Paris, intending to join the École Normale Supérieure. Conscripted in 1939 and discharged in October 1940, Mammeri registered at the Faculté des Lettres d’Alger. Re-conscripted in 1942 after the American landing, he participated in the allied campaigns in France, Italy, and Germany.

After the end of the war, he received his degree as a professor of arts and returned to Algeria in September 1947. He taught in Médéa, and then in Ben Aknoun, and published his first novel, The Forgotten Hill in 1952. He was forced to leave Algiers in 1957 because of the Algerian War. Mammeri came back to Algeria shortly after its independence in 1962.

From 1965 to 1972 he taught Berber at the university in the department of ethnology; although teaching Berber was prohibited in 1962 by the Algerian government, he was permitted to teach Berber courses until 1973, when courses such as ethnology and anthropology were judged as "colonial sciences" and disbanded. In 1969 Mammeri collected and published texts of the Berber poet Si Mohand. In 1972, he published the grammar of Tamazight in Tamazight, a book in which he used a Latin-based alphabet and defined the orthographic rules for this language. These became the standard for writing in Tamazight today. From 1969 to 1980 he directed the Anthropological, Prehistoric and Ethnographic Research center at Algiers (CRAPE). He also headed the first national Union of Algerian Writers for a time, until he left due to disagreements over views of the role of writers in society. In 1980, the prohibition of one of his conferences at Tizi Ouzou on kabyle poetry caused riots and what would be called the Berber Spring in Kabylie.

In 1982, he founded the Center of Amazigh Studies and Research (CERAM) and a periodical called Awal (The Word, with two other scholars Pierre Bourdieu & Tassadit Yacine ) in Paris, and organized several seminars on the Amazigh language and literature at the École des Hautes Études en Sciences Sociales (EHESS). Thus he was able to compile a wealth of information on the Berber language and literature. In 1988 he received an honorary doctorate from Sorbonne.

Mammeri died the evening of February 26, 1989, in a car accident, which took place near Ain-Defla on his return from a symposium in Oujda (Morocco). His funeral was spectacular, with more than 200,000 people in attendance. No officials attended the funeral, where the crowd organized in demonstrating against the government.

=== Quotes ===
Every thing started with the dominos argument which exasperated Arezki and which Sliman, his young brother, had, once again, explained immediately: "This war is the salvation of the infortunate. When everything burns, when every thing is destroyed, when the storm, the avalanche and the hurricane have carried away or engulfed everything, the earth will once again be virgin. Everything will be questioned. It will be just like in dominos: a new distribution will be made", And you'll be a beggar as before, said Arezki. "No, my brother we've suffered enough, it's time for the poor to be fortunate".

— Mouloud Mammeri, Extracted from The sleep of the Just (1940)

== Legacy ==
Mouloud Mammeri University of Tizi-Ouzou is named after him. The culture hall in the city of Tizi Ouzou is also named after him.

== Works ==
=== Novels ===
- "La Colline oubliée", Paris, Plon, 1952, 2nde édition, Paris, Union Générale d’Éditions, S.N.E.D., col. 10/18, 1978 (ISBN 2-264-00907-1); Paris, Folio Gallimard, 1992 (ISBN 2-07-038474-8).
- "Le petit stupide", Paris, Plon, 1952, 2nde édition, Paris, Union Générale d’Éditions, S.N.E.D., col. 10/18, 1978 (ISBN 2-264-00908-X).
- L'opium et le bâton: roman (in French). (1965/1992). Paris: Éditions La Découverte. ISBN 2-7071-2086-3.
- "La Traversée", Paris, Plon, 1982, 2nde édition, Alger, Bouchène, 1992.

=== Short stories ===
- « Ameur des arcades et l’ordre », Paris, 1953, Plon, « La table ronde », N°72.
- « Le petit mechant», Preuves, Paris, N° 76, Juin 1957, PP. 33–67.
- « La Meute », Europe, Paris, N°567-568, Juillet-Août 1976 .
- « L’Hibiscus », Montréal, 1985, Dérives N°49, PP. 67–80.
- « Le Désert Atavique », Paris, 1981, quotidien Le Monde du 16 Août 1981.
- « Ténéré Atavique », Paris, 1983, Revue Autrement N°05.
- « Escales », Alger, 1985, Révolution africaine; Paris, 1992, La Découverte (ISBN 2-7071-2043-X).

=== Theatre ===
- « Le Foehn ou la preuve par neuf », Paris, PubliSud, 1982, 2nde édition, Paris, pièce jouée à Alger en 1967 .
- « Le Banquet », précédé d’un dossier, la mort absurde des aztèques, Paris, Librairie académique Perrin, 1973.
- « La Cité du soleil », sortie en trois tableaux, Alger, 1987, Laphomic, M. Mammeri : Entretien avec Tahar Djaout, pp. 62–94.

=== Translation and literary criticism ===
- Les Isefra by Mohand ou Mohand (in French). (1969). Paris: F. Maspero. OCLC 186896.
- Poèmes kabyles anciens (in French). (1980). Paris: F. Maspero. ISBN 2-7071-1150-3.
- « L ‘Ahellil du Gourara », Paris, M.S.H., 1984 (ISBN 2-7351-0107-X).
- « Yenna-yas Ccix Muhand », Alger, Laphomic, 1989.
- « Machaho, contes berbères de Kabylie », Paris, Bordas.
- « Tellem chaho, contes berbères de Kabylie », Paris, Bordas, 1980.

=== Grammar and linguistic ===
- « Tajeṛṛumt n tmaziɣt (tantala taqbaylit) », Paris, Maspéro, 1976.
- Précis de grammaire berbère (kabyle) (in French). (1987). Paris: Editions AWAL. ISBN 2-906659-00-2.
- « Lexique français-touareg », en collaboration avec J.M. Cortade, Paris, Arts et métiers graphiques, 1967.
- « Amawal Tamazight-Français et Français-Tamazight », Imedyazen, Paris, 1980.
- « Awal », cahiers d’études berbères, sous la direction de M. Mammeri, 1985–1989, Paris, Awal
