= Malika Domrane =

Algerian singer, originally from Kabylie

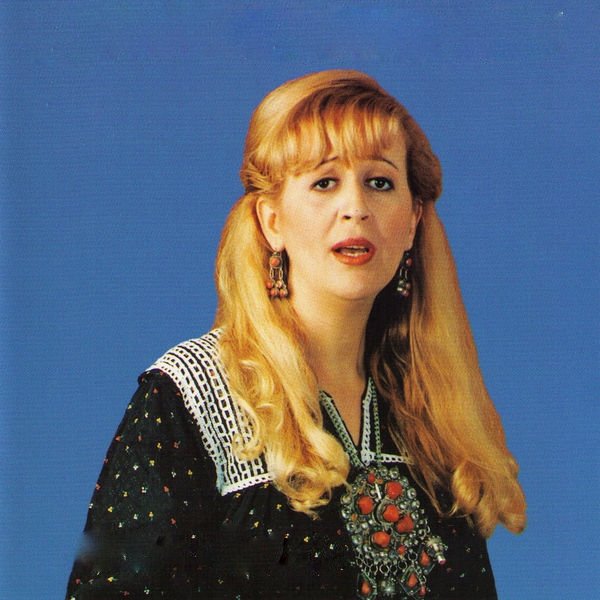
- Born: 12 March 1956 (age 70); Tizi Hibel
- Occupation: Singer
- Years active: 1969–current
- Notable work: Tsuha

Malika Domrane (Tamazight: ⵎⴰⵍⵉⴽⴰ ⴷⵓⵎⴰⵔⴰⵏ, Malika Dumran; born 12 March 1956 in Tizi Hibel) is an Algerian singer known for her contributions to Berber music and her advocacy for women's rights and cultural identity.

== Life ==
Domrane was born in Tizi Hibel, a village in the commune of Aït Mahmoud in Kabylia, Algeria. She began singing at a young age, participating in her high school choir in Tizi Ouzou.^{3}

In 1969 she won a gold medal at festival in Algeria. After graduating as a nurse, she began work in a hospital but soon decided to dedicate herself professionally to singing, in defiance of the customs of her family and village.

In 1979, she went to France to release her first album, Tsuha, her first great success. She later published several albums, with songs typified by feminist cultural and the linguistic demands of the Berber. From 1994, she decided to live in France with her family.

== Albums ==
- Tsuha (1979)
- Thayriw Themouth (1981)
- NostAlgérie (1998, Arcade Records: 59 '38')
- Asaru (2001) (Blue Silver Records)
