= Agouni Gueghrane =

- Commune and town
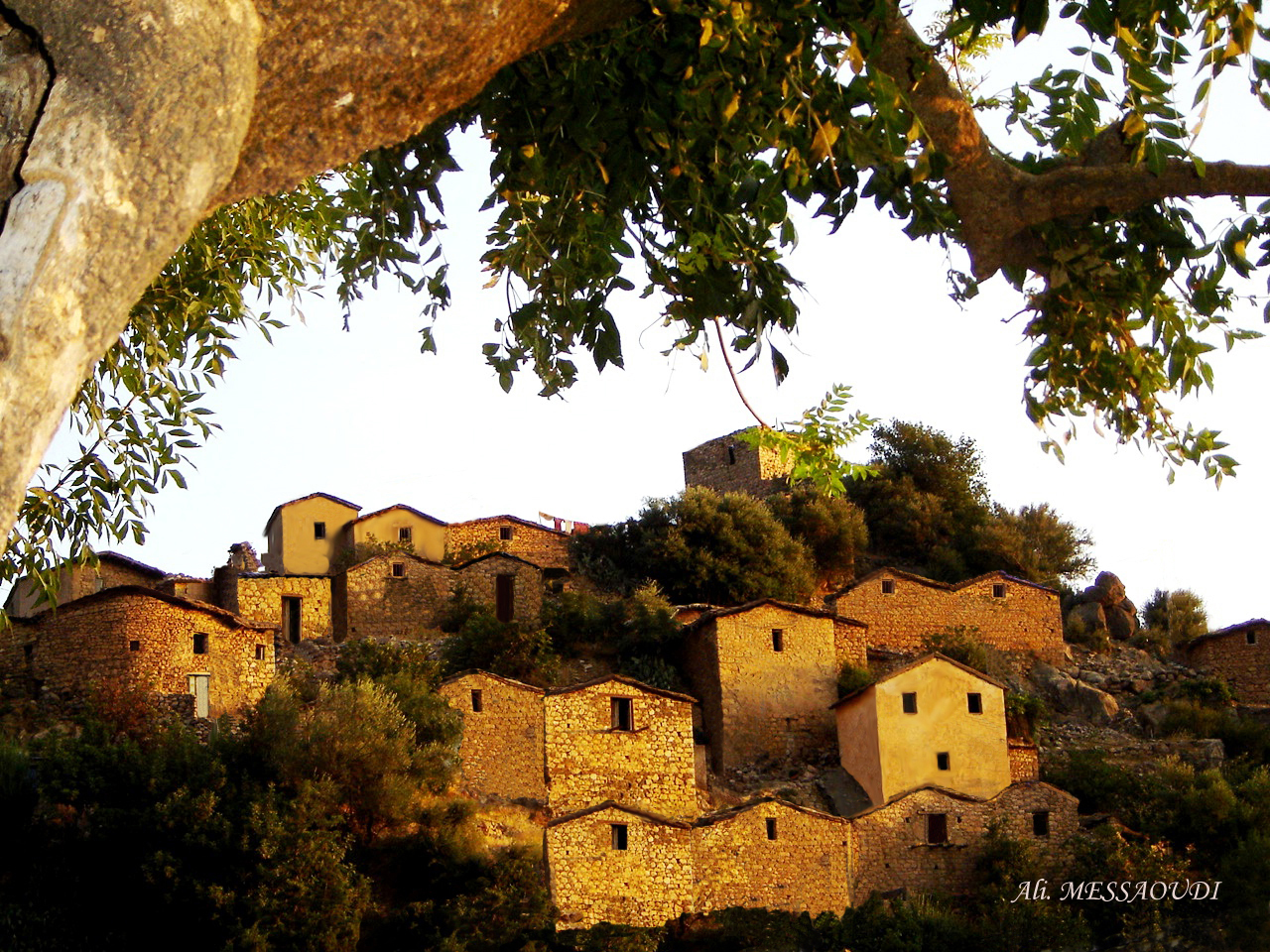

- Agouni Gueghrane within Tizi Ouzou Province

- Agouni Gueghrane within Algeria
- Country: Algeria
- Province: Tizi Ouzou Province
- Time zone: UTC+1 (CET)

Agouni Gueghrane is a town and commune in northern Algeria in the Tizi Ouzou Province in the Kabylia region.
