= Berberism =

Berber political movement of North Africa

The Berber flag adopted by the World Amazigh Congress in 1998

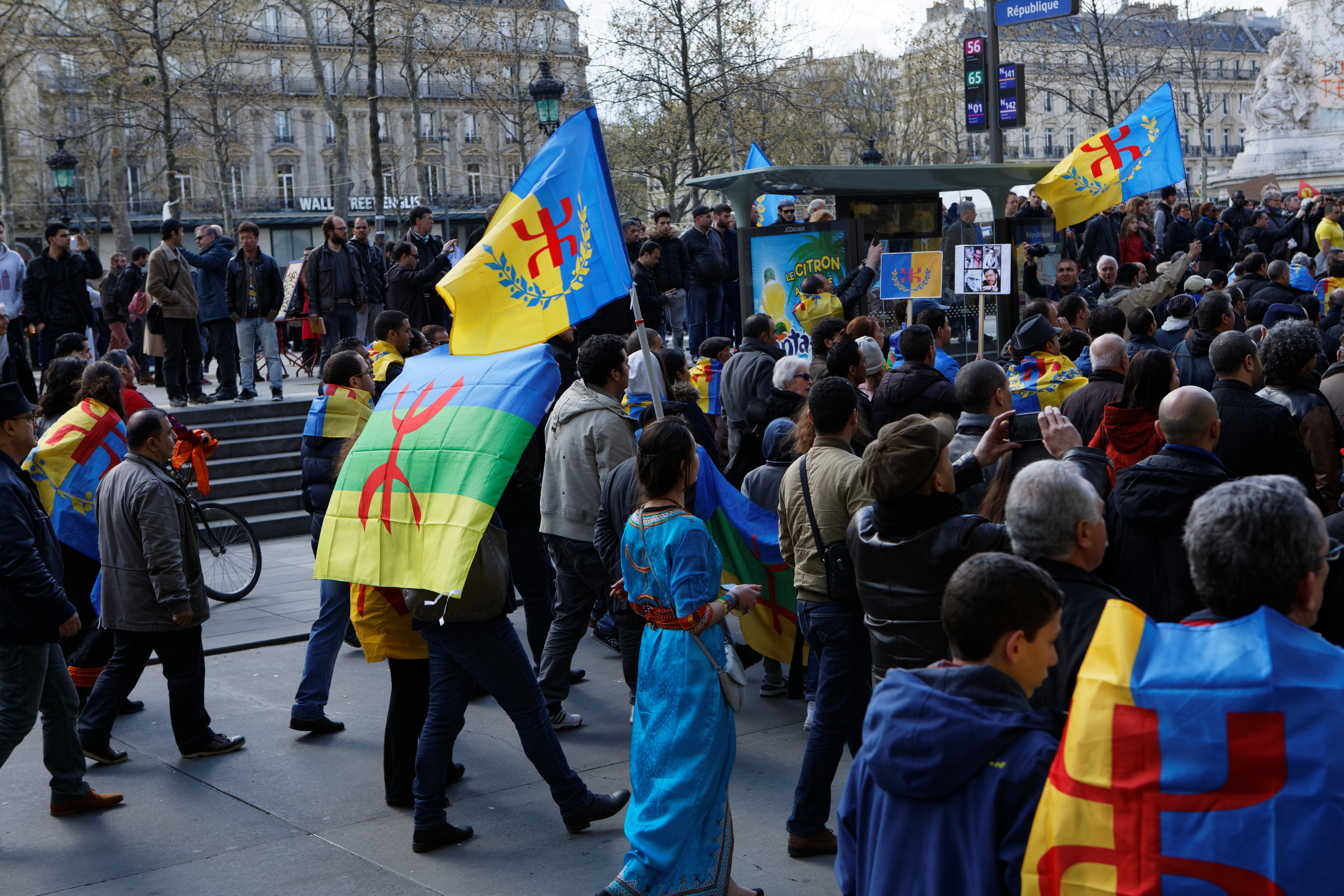
Demonstration of Kabyles in Paris, April 2016

Berberism, also known as Amazighism, is a Berber political movement that advocates for the recognition of Berber (Amazigh) identity, languages, and rights in North Africa. The movement emerged in Algeria and Morocco in the face of state-led Arabization, pan-Arabism, and discrimination against Berber communities. While mainly focused on cultural and linguistic rights, some Berberist movements such as the MAK in Algeria, particularly among the diaspora, also advocate for separatism.

Opposition to Berberism has drawn on anti-Berber rhetoric, stemming from Arab supremacy, including tropes that the Berber identity was a French colonial invention. Scholars have also noted racialized tropes portraying Berbers as "sons of the White Fathers."

== Algeria ==
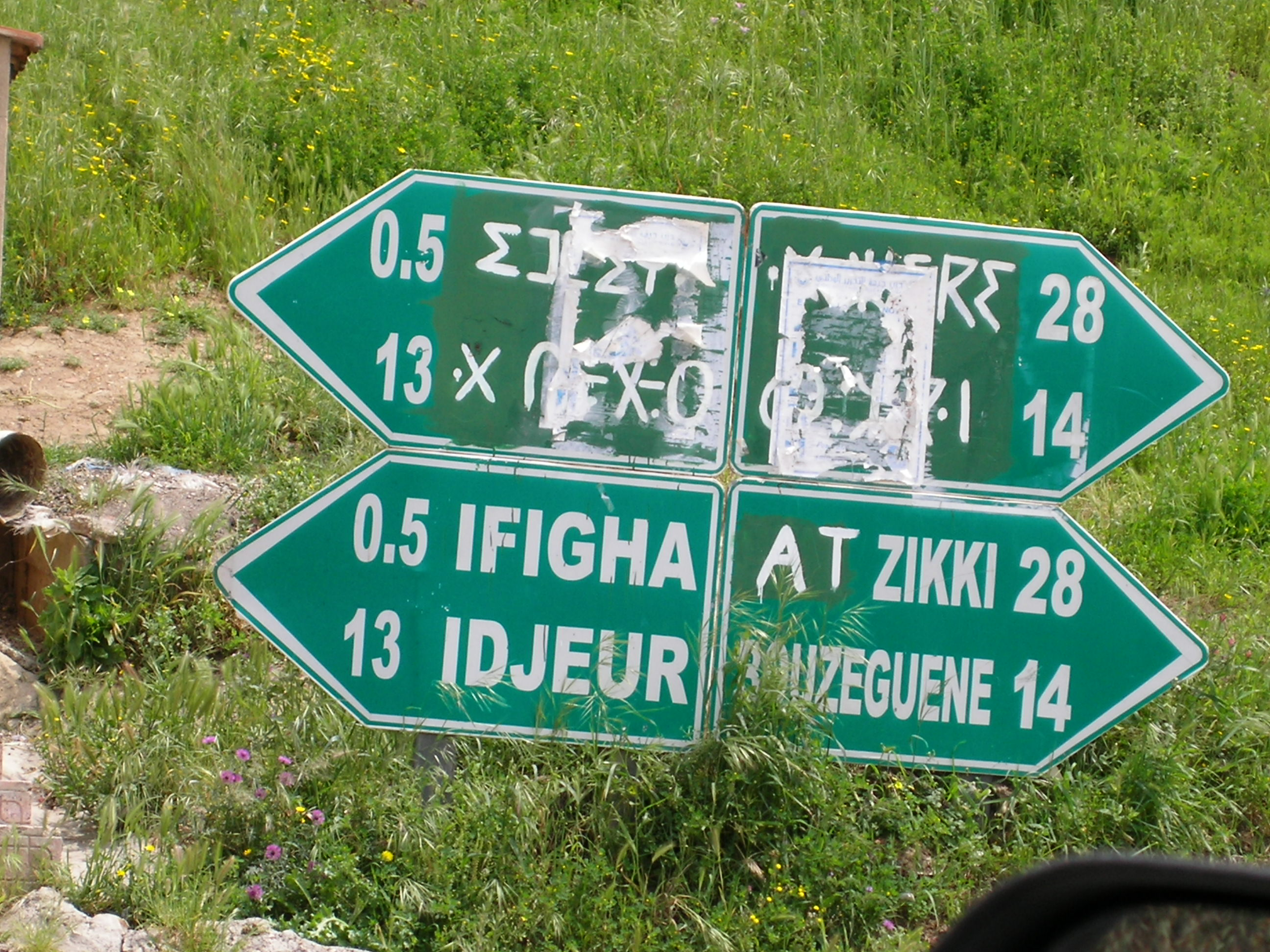
Road sign in Algeria, showing evidence of dispute over whether names should be written in Arabic, Berber, or French

=== A sense of historical belonging ===
Kabyle identity, along with other Berber-speaking groups, did not suddenly emerge in the 20th century. Berber (Amazigh) identity has ancient historical roots and is not a creation of colonialism, contrary to the postulate put forward by Arab-Muslim ideology, even if the French conquest did have an impact on the ground. Popular poetry of resistance to French colonization (19th century) makes reference to a Kabyle entity. On another level, Berber and Kabyle identity recognizes the Amazigh-Jewish, Amazigh Christian, and later Muslim communities.

=== Modern Day ===
Kabylian Berbers constitute two-thirds of the Berber population and have been the strongest advocates for the Berber movement. The second-largest group are the Chaoui Berbers who reside in the Aures mountains. While the elite sphere consisted of the Kabyle population, the Chaoui played an important role due to their military influence. On the whole, the Berberophones make up roughly 25% of the Algerian population, constituting seven to eight million people. In 2002, Tamazight was declared a national language in Algeria alongside Arabic to accommodate this large percentage of the population. In 2016 it was declared to be an official language, and efforts are underway to create a Standard variation of the Algerian Berber dialects.

=== Impact of the French conquest ===
Historically, Berber presence was not ignored by European scholars before the conquest of 1830. But in the eyes of the French, Algeria was populated by "Moors" and "Turks" before the conquest. This view changed with the capture of Algiers, and the inhabitants were increasingly referred to as "Arabs." Given Kabylia's proximity, contact with Berber-speaking populations, who were not inclined towards colonization, quickly followed: the presence of "two races" or "two languages" was then discovered.

As part of the "Berber policy" of the French colonial empire, designed to "pacify" Kabylia, French colonialists promoted the idea that Kabyle people were more predisposed than Arabs to assimilate into "French civilization." This was known as the Kabyle myth. Yves Lacoste explained that "turning the Arabs into invaders was one way of legitimizing the French presence". The Berbers were elevated above the Arabs through the narrative that Berber ancestral heritage stemmed from Europe. Consequently, Arabs were associated with backwardness, which the Berbers profited from, as it granted them a higher status within the colonial system.

During the period of French colonization, Arabic and Berber were declared foreign languages in Algeria with the aim to replace them with French. The French in particular sought to promote the French language Berbers, particularly in Kabyle.

These attempts to win over the Berber population saw mixed success. Berbers were on the forefront of the Independence movement with several key leaders of National Liberation Front (FLN), including Hocine Aït Ahmed, Abane Ramdane, and Krim Belkacem. The Berber regions of Aurès and Kabylia were geographically remotene and there was widespread local support for independence and the FLN. The Soummam conference, often cited as the founding act of the Algerian state, took place in Kabylia. Due to Berber regions serving as hotbeds for FLN guerillas, these regions were labelled major targets in French counter-insurgency operations.

Following Algerian Independence, Berber leaders increasingly opposed the central government, in particular its Arabist policies and lack of political pluralism. Two years of armed conflict in Kabylia followed, leaving more than 400 dead and most FLN leaders from Kabylia exiled or executed.

=== 1940 to 1950 Berberist crisis ===
The developments of 1940 to 1950 constituted a period of social unrest in Algerian politics which would set the framework for the coming years. The emergence of the Algerian Arabism-Islamism Nationalist framework meant to combat colonialism was accompanied by the emergence of Berberism, to combat this Arabism-Islamism. The Berbers demanded for the redefinition of the society they were historically a part of (linguistically and culturally): they wanted an 'Algerian Algeria' to represent all the ethnic and cultural minorities of the nation. The Movement for the Triumph of Democratic Liberties (MTLD) continued to impose the Arabism-Islamism framework and were denounced as anti-democratic by Berber activists.

The MTLD refused to acknowledge these minorities because it would have hindered their advancement in the provincial elections. This led to the beginning of open conflict between Berber partisans and "Arab unity" advocates: the outbreak of the Berber crisis. At this stage, the Algerian People's Party (PPA) and MTLD, both headquartered in Paris, had merged to advance the Berber platform. They wanted to replace the single-party state system with democracy. This 'Algerian Algeria' would include the contributions, histories and cultures of all the ethnic populations. The platform as stated by Rachid Ali revolved around the fact that the Berbers should break the status quo that they have no place in society, as Algeria does not belong to the Arab world but was instead a nation for all its citizens. With the adoption of this platform, the Berber activists were seen as a threat to unity and independence by the Arabists-Islamists, on the account that "the Berbers wished to impose the Western agenda on Algeria".

The Berberist crisis of 1949 led to the formation of the Berber Cultural Movement (MCB). Its agenda was to challenge Arabism and Islamism, and oppose Arabization because of its "de-frenchifying" objectives and its alleged opposition to democratic and secular ideals. Berberists called for a Western-style socio-political system with the French language and French culture as its vectors. This was criticized by Arab Nationalists for being too assimilationist.

=== Effects of 1962 constitution and Arabization ===
The 1962 Constitution declared that Islam was the state religion and Arabic was the national language. These two aspects of identity became mutually exclusive to be Algerian. In turn, linguistic and cultural diversity was interpreted as a threat to national unity. Rapid Arabization measures were implemented after independence in 1962 which sought to spread the Arabic language throughout the country. This was largely in an attempt to reclaim and reconstruct the Algerian identity which was lost during French colonial rule.

The rise in Arabic speakers and education institutions was accompanied by the decline in the Berber speakers. Linguistic ability was a large factor in Berber identification meaning its decline was a threat to the survival of the Berber identity. The Berber narrative stated that the rapid Arab-Islamic conquest was rising at the expense of the Berber identity. The Berber struggle was seen as an uphill battle. Furthermore, these Arabization measures stigmatized the Berber speakers vis-à-vis the Arabic speakers through the creation of more rigid divides between the communities. Political and social power was seen to lie with the Arabs who imposed their will on the Berber minority.

=== Outburst of 1980s: the Berber question, the Berber Spring, the rise of political parties ===
The Berber Question was revived during this period. The youth of Kabyle fought for the assertion of their Berber culture in a post-independent Arabist-Islamist Algeria. Repression of Berber particularism combined with the accelerating programs of Arabization in schools and universities led to the sharpening of the divide and the eventual outbreak of the 1980 Berber Spring. The catalyst was set on 10 March 1980, when the government banned a lecture given by Mouloud Mammeri on Ancient Berber poetry at the University of Tizi Ouzou. Strikes continued until 26 June. The Berber demonstrations in Algeria of that year were the first instance in the international scene where a Berber group demanded recognition on the institutional level of their culture, language, and place in society. The later 1980s saw a rise in Berber associations, political parties and cultural movements. Article 56 of the 1976 constitution stated that preliminary certification was needed in order to establish associations, over which the administration had discretionary power. Legally, this meant that no Berber associations could exist from 1962 until this was amended out of the constitution in 1988. Underground Berber groups could now officially register themselves, and by July 1989 there were officially 154 of these organizations. Of the most notable included the Berber Cultural Movement (MCB) which held its first official meeting in July 1989 in Tizi Ouzo. The MCB comprised French intellectuals and Kabliyan students with the agenda to oppose Arabization, call for recognition of Berber culture and language, and implement a Western style democracy. The MCB mobilized large groups of people and coordinated multiple protests to advance Berber culture, language, and position in civil society. However, the MCB had major limits on the account that the MCB was unable to resist the partisan tensions between the FFS and the RCD.

=== Events of 1990s ===
==== Creation of the High Commission for Amazighity (HCA) in 1995 ====
The creation of the HCA is regarded as the first step by the government to recognize the language of the Berber population, Tamazight. The commission would be attached to the office of the President and the commissioner would be appointed by the President to oversee the initiatives undertaken to advance and institutionalize the Berber language. The HCA was officially created by a decree on 8 May 1995, meaning it was in a fragile state due to its revocability. The government refused to acknowledge Tamazight as a national language alongside Arabic, while this decree was meant "to rehabilitate one of the components of the national culture and identity of all Algerians. It [was] in no way a recognition of linguistic or cultural rights of a particular area or minority".

==== Constitutional reform of 1996 ====
Changes in the constitution reflected this recognition and advancement of Berber language. The 1989 constitution made no mention of Berberism and declared in its second and third articles that "Islam is the religion of the state" and "Arabic is the national and official language". Whereas these two amendments were carried forward to the 1996 constitution, there was also the addition of a preamble which stated that "the fundamental components of its [Algeria's] identity are Islam, "Arabness", and Berberness. Later in the preamble, was the mention that "Algeria is the land of Islam, an integral part of the Greater Maghreb, an Arab, Mediterranean and African country," subsequently contradicting the weight of the former advancement. Nonetheless, it was among the first steps towards recognition taken by the government.

==== 1998 protests ====
Berber communities broke out in mass protest against the law which declared Arabic as the only legitimate language in Algeria. This law was originally declared in 1991 and meant to go into effect on 5 July 1998. Throughout the years Kabyle culturists had continued to oppose the implantation of this law, mobilizing again for this cause. The last Berber mobilization of this size had been the Berber springs. Tension had been built up throughout the years by this law, however the catalyst which fueled this outbreak was the assassination of Lounes Matoub on 25 June 1998, an Algerian Berber singer and activist, by the Group Islamique Armee (GIA). Matoub had just arrived from France and was on track to release his 4th CD criticizing post-independence regime and asserting the Berber identity. On June 28, his funeral was held and 100,000 Berbers came together to protest, which resulted in the continuation of week-long outbursts of violence targeted at government property. Banners titled "no peace without the Berber language," "we are not Arabs," and "pouvoir assassin, [President Liamine] Zeroual assassin" could be seen throughout the protests.

== Morocco ==
=== Berbers and the Parliament ===
The "Mouvement Populaire" (MP) is the most important party that is associated with Berbers. It was established in 1957 by Mahjoubi Aherdane and Moroccan Liberation Army leader Abdelkrim al-Khatib. While predominantly comprising Berbers, the MP did not explicitly identify itself as a Berber party. Officially, it represented the rural populations, but became associated with the Berber movement since Berbers were prevalent in rural areas. In the parliament the MP was used by Hassan II to counterbalance the opposition, especially the Istiqlal Party. The King in turn shared royal patronage with the party leaders. The King further cultivated the relationship by doing the same with other Berber notables. This formed a strong bond between the leaders of the community and the monarchy. One of the results was that many Berbers were in the military and until 1972 many held the rank of officer. The change in 1972 was caused by two attempted coups led by Berber officers. But in general the ethnic group was still able to reach high positions in society. As another result of the alliance Hassan II allowed the community small forms of cultural expression as long as it wasn't deemed political (this also concerned the program of the MP).

In 1979 the MP did try to advance Berber rights through the parliament. It became important because as a result the government announced an investigation in the "Berber Question". The outcome was a recommendation that a new government organization needed to be formed to attend to the needs of Berbers, but the it was never realized. However the official attention provided hope for the activists that they could advance their goals. Despite this, the MP failed to do anything to advance any "Berberization" and were the major party in the ruling coalition that enacted Arabization in 1965.

In the parliament the parties with Berber supporters and the Islamists opposed each other. The problem originated from the Islamists and their support of further Arabization of society. Arabization went against the adoption of Tamazight in society which was supported by parties dependent on Berber supporters.

=== The Foundation of NGOs in the 1960s ===
The 1960s were important for Berbers because of the founding of a number of NGOs. In 1965 the "Moroccan Amazigh Cultural Movement" (MACM) was founded. The organization is a confederation of multiple (smaller) NGOs which banded together in order to better coordinate their actions. The organization has grown to include over 100 organizations in the 21st century. Another important organization is the "Association Marocaine de Recherche d’Échange Culture" (AMREC) which was founded in 1967. The association was formed by students and intellectuals in Rabat and Paris. AMREC was established in order to promote and preserve Berber culture and folk art. The foundation of AMREC inspired many other associations to be formed. The NGOs were responsible for organizing a wide variety of events in Morocco. They range from Berber festivals, handicraft workshops, folklore expressions to musical events. The monarchy allowed these on one condition: the activities were not allowed to be political and could only be cultural expressions. The government subsidized some of the events as long as they adhered to the rules.

=== The effects of the Berber Spring ===
In 1980 the "Berber Spring" broke out in Algeria. The government of Hassan II saw the public disorder in Algeria and changed its course in order to avoid a similar event in Morocco. The result was that the years of 1980-1982 were characterized by an opening in political liberties for Berber expression. The activists were motivated by the new climate and formed many new cultural associations. The king also appointed two important Berber figures in high positions to show his new attitude. Mahjoubi Aherdane was named the head of a newly formed cultural organization, the "Commission Nationale pour la Sauvegarde des Arts Populaires". Whereas Mohamed Chafik was similarly appointed as the head of the prestigious “Le Académie Royal”. Furthermore, the king approved the release of a Berber journal. A number of conferences were also held by the activists in which important new connections were made. One of the most important events was a conference at the "l’Universit éd’Ét éd’Agadir" in 1980. In this event it was decided to adopt the name "Amazigh" instead of "Berber". In 1982 most of the freedoms granted were retracted and the Years of Lead continued.

=== Events of the 1990's ===
==== The "Agadir Charter" of 1991 ====
The Moroccan government adopted a change in direction from the Years of Lead in the 1990s. The regime introduced greater civil liberties, reduced human rights abuses and increased freedom of association. Although repression was still present in these years. The increase in civil liberties resulted in the foundation of many new Berber associations. In the year 1991 multiple NGO's came together and released a document called the "Agadir Charter". The Charter was initially signed by 6 NGO's: AMREC, Tamaynut, L’Association de l’Universitéd’Été d’Agadir (AUEA), Tilelli, L’Association Ilmas and L’Association Culturelle de Sous. After it released 5 other groups signed it.

The document consists out of 7 different points. The points range from demands of recognition of the Berber culture and identity to demands of Berber media. The document is important because it publicly showed the unity of the different NGO's. But it also became important since the government did not answer with any forms of repression. It motivated many Berber to feel more confident to publicly express their culture or support Berber activism.

==== The Concessions of 1994 ====
The year 1994 was an important year for Berber activists. In May, seven members of the Berber association Tilelli (freedom) were arrested while protesting for cultural rights. They were all convicted and 3 of them received prison sentences while the rest received fines. While the group was in jail they were physically abused. This information quickly spread to the public and massive national outcry followed. The human rights abuse even gained international attention. The negative attention convinced the state to release the members that were still in jail and reduce the sentences of the entire group.

The event convinced Hassan II that public opinion had changed in favour of the Berber. The result was a change in policy of the government. The regime started by creating news bulletins on the national television network in Tamazight. Afterwards the state increased the funding of regional radio programs on Berber culture, such as Radio Agadir. The concessions reached a symbolic height in August during a speech. In the speech Hassan II recognized the Berber culture as part of the Moroccan national identity. Over the next 5 years this symbolism was repeated in other speeches. The speech of 1994 caused many activists to seek out the state in the hope of realizing their demands. In 1995 the king announced the intent to incorporate Tamazight in education, however when Hassan II died the program had still not been implemented. It showed that the government still did not fully embrace the ethnic group. Another important sign that showed this was that in 1996 a law was passed to ban Berber names for children.

=== Achievements of the Berberist movement ===
Amazigh identity in Morocco was highlighted prominently and gained greater official recognition after King Mohammed VI's speech in Ajdir (Khenifra region) in October 2001. The king's words reportedly were a response to, and helped reduce, tensions with Amazigh activists and intellectuals who had presented a document — referred to as the Berber Manifesto — to the royal palace, a year earlier. The Berber Manifesto demanded national and legal recognition of Amazigh identity.

On 17 October 2001, in the presence of his advisors, the members of the government, the leaders of the political parties and unions, and Berber activists, King Mohammed VI announced the royal decree (dahir) that established the Royal Institute of Amazigh Culture (L'Institut Royal de la Culture Amazighe, IRCAM). He defined Moroccan national identity as a composition of different cultural elements, underlined that the Berber language constituted a principal element of the national culture, and added that its promotion was a national responsibility. The Royal Institute was charged with the promotion of Berber culture in education and media. While redefining Moroccan identity so as to incorporate Berberness. The institute has not been without criticism. The more radical activists see it as an attempts to buy off the movement and to control its actions. Meanwhile, the more moderate camp sees it as a chance to advance their cause from within the state. The establishment of IRCAM represented the first substantial change in the state's attitude towards its Berber population from a policy of subtle neglect to explicit recognition and support.

In 2005, there was an attempt to create a Berberist party, when Omar Louz, a long-time Berberist, former member of the Popular Movement and cofounder of the Amazigh World Congress, founded the Amazigh Moroccan Democratic Party. The party was banned by the Moroccan Interior Ministry on 25 November 2007 due to the Moroccan law on political parties, which forbids party names explicitly based on ethnicity or religion. This was followed by an unsuccessful attempt legally to reestablish the party under a new name, (Izegzawen), to promote Berber identity, political secularism, and Berber cultural rights.

The recognition of Tamazight as an official language, in 2011 by King Mohamed the VI, is another important achievement of the Berberist movement. This recognition came after the demonstrations of the Arab Spring and the February 20th movement (which contained many Berbers).

=== French Berber policy (early 20th century) ===
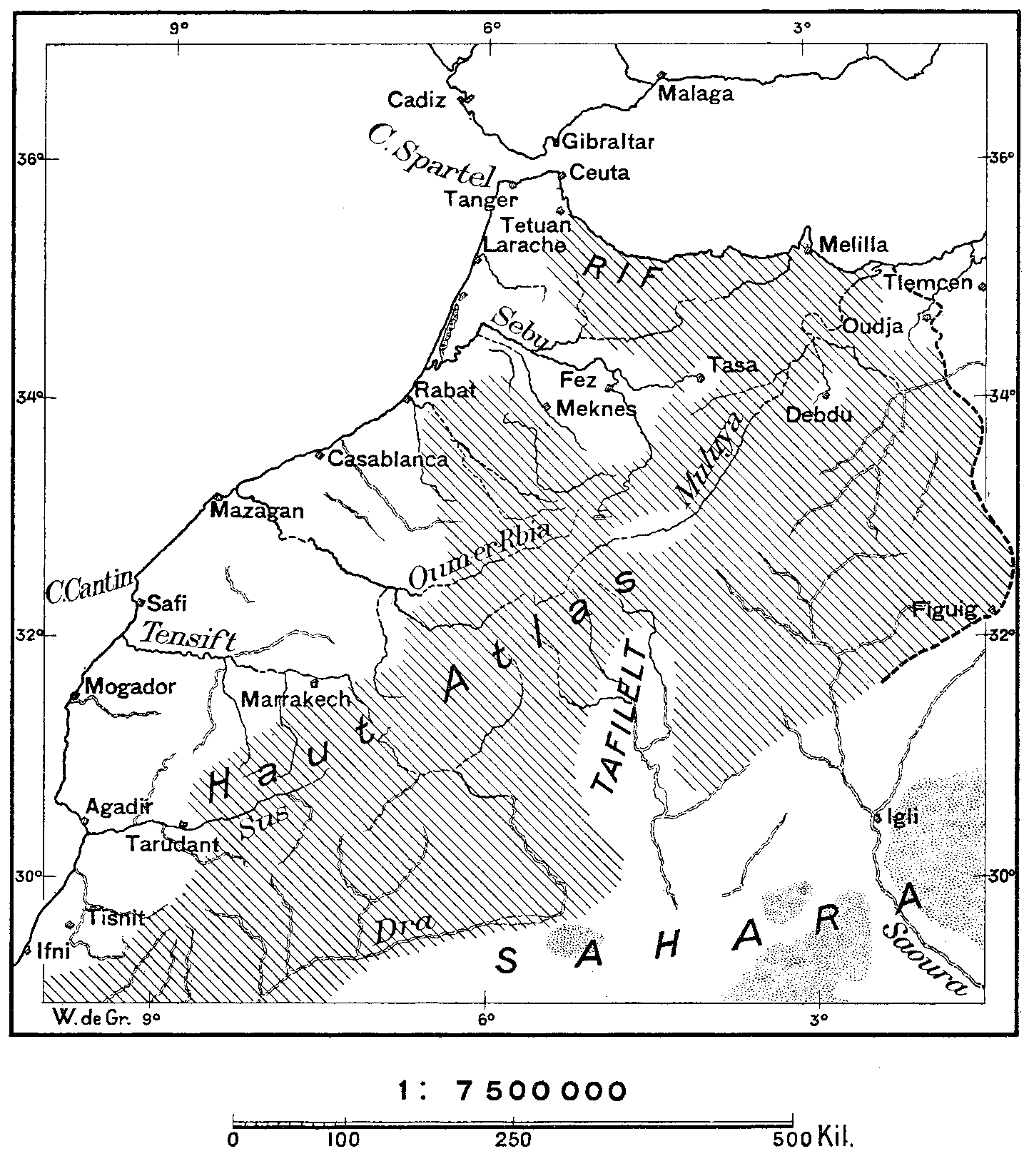
20th century map depicting Bled el-Makhzen (white) and Bled es-Siba (highlighted)

Historically, the French Berber policy in Morocco had roots before the beginning of the French protectorate in Morocco in 1912. For example, the Mission Scientifique au Maroc was started in 1903 to collect social, economic, ecological, ethnographic, political, and cultural information about Morocco first led by French orientalist Edmond Doutté then by French orientalist Édouard Michaux-Bellaire. It also was influenced by the Kabyle myth. One of the purposes of the Berber policy was it being a means of control. One official said, for example, "The Berber race is a useful instrument for counteracting the Arab race... and the Makhzan itself". Another was forging a new Berber identity under French influence rather than conserving the traditional Berber identity.

Beginning from the 1920, the French administration also created Franco-Berber schools (French: écoles francoberbères) that were set up by Resident-General Hubert Lyautey and restricted to the Berber population. These schools included the Collège d'Azrou which led to the formation of a new Francophone rural Berber elite. In these schools, French was the primary language followed by Berber. The curriculum of these schools excluded religious courses, the Arabic language and the Quran. Lyautey on the Franco-Berber schools said:

From an immediate political point of view, the schools have as objective to provide hygiene and maintain discreetly but as firmly as possible the linguistic, religious and social differences existing between the Makhzen, Islamized and Arabized, and the Berber mountain, religious but pagan and ignorant of Arabic.

The Berber Dahir was a dhahir (decree) created by the French protectorate in Morocco on 16 May 1930. This dhahir changed the legal system in parts of Morocco, it replaced the pre-colonial Islamic Sharia system in Berber areas with old pre-Islamic Berber laws, which many Moroccan nationalists saw as an attempt by the French to weaken the authority of the Makhzen and strengthen the autonomy of Berber tribes, causing public demonstrations and protests against the French in all Moroccan cities. The new legal system in Berber communities would ostensibly be based on local Berber laws and customs rather than the authority of the sultan. The legal system in the rest of the country remained the way it had been before the French invasion. Lebanese prince Shakib Arslan took this as evidence of an attempt to de-Islamize Morocco.

The Berber Dahir reinforced a dichotomy in popular Moroccan historiography: the division of the country into Bled el-Makhzen—areas under the direct control of the Sultan and the Makhzen, or the state, (especially urban areas such as Fes and Rabat)—and Bled es-Siba—typically geographically isolated areas beyond the direct control of the state, where Berber languages are primarily spoken and where Islamic Sharia was not applied. The former was described as Arab and the latter as Berber.

French sociologist Jacques Berque summing up the Berber policy said "it sanctioned the existence of a Berber reserve, a sort of national park which was to be sheltered from the ideologies of the plain, whether Arab or French".

== Canary Islands ==
MPAIAC flag

Beginning with Antonio Cubillo's Canary Islands Independence Movement in the early 1970s, some Canarian nationalist organizations have supported Berberism to emphasize native Guanche cultural difference with Spanish culture and highlight Spanish colonialism. Although the movements attracted sympathies among local Canarians, the violent terror actions that were used initially by Cubillo's movement brought about a general rejection. Thus, even after Cubillo publicly renounced the armed struggle in August 1979, he failed to inspire much popular support.

Currently some political organizations in the Canary Islands such as the National Congress of the Canaries (CNC), the Popular Front of the Canary Islands (FREPIC-AWAÑAK), Alternativa Popular Canaria, Canarian Nationalist Party (PNC), Nueva Canarias (NC), Alternativa Popular Canaria (APC), Alternativa Nacionalista Canaria (ANC), Unidad del Pueblo (UP), Inekaren and Azarug espouse the pro-Berber cause in a higher or lower degree. Some of the symbols and colors of the flags of the Canarian pro-independence organizations, as well as the use of the word 'Taknara' (rejected by Cubillo himself) to refer to the archipelago, are seeking to represent Berber cultural roots.

== International ==
International societies to protect the interests and cultural heritages such as the World Amazigh Congress have been active for years.

== See also ==
- Algerianism
- Anti-Arabism
- Arab-Berber
- Arabized Berber
- Barbary Coast
- Berber Jews
- Berber Revolt
- Berbers and Islam
- Ethnic nationalism
- Kabyle nationalism
- Lucien-Samir Oulahbib
- Moors
- Muslim conquest of the Maghreb
- Tamazgha
