= Human rights in Libya under Muammar Gaddafi =

Human rights abuses committed in Libya under rule of Muammar Gaddafi

During Muammar Gaddafi's rule over Libya, multiple crimes against humanity were committed by government forces against the Libyan population. This included extrajudicial killings, public executions, ethnic cleansing, and the torture of civilians. During the Libyan Civil War in 2011, Gaddafi's forces killed allegedly unarmed protestors and indiscriminately bombed civilian areas, drawing condemnation from human rights organizations.

== Student protests ==
On April 7, 1976, university students throughout Libya protested against human rights violations and authoritarian military control over all aspects of civilian lives. Protesters called for free and fair elections to take place and a more democratic system to be implemented in Libya. These protests were then violently suppressed by government forces through shootings and beatings, with many of the students being captured and detained. Universities and secondary schools were then all raided by Gaddafi in order to "silence and eliminate" the protesters.

The detained students were kept in prisons until April 7, 1977, the anniversary of the event, which Gaddafi called "The Day of Judgement". On this day, the students were publicly executed by hanging in Benghazi with thousands of people in attendance and watching the event live on television. April 7 then became an anniversary that was celebrated by publicly executing civilians as well as defected government officials. This lasted until the late 80s-early 90s.

== War with Chad ==
Gaddafi's war with Chad did not only have a negative impact on Chad, it had a detrimental impact to the Libyan economy and the army. In the Toyota War alone, Libya had lost over US$1.5 Billion and a large amount of military equipment. This war was widely condemned by the Libyan population as they felt they had no right to invade another country that didn't belong to them.

During this war, thousands of underage Libyan high school students were stolen from schools (in Benghazi, Tripoli, and the South) by the government without the consent or knowledge of their parents. After these boys were forcefully taken out of their schools, they were loaded onto busses and sent to Chad. Some of them were killed in battle, and some were deserted in Chad by the Libyan army. Thousands of families were left confused and unaware as to what happened to their sons, with most never hearing from them ever again.

== Executions ==
The Gaddafi regime was notorious for its common use of public executions as a sentence for Libyans who either spoke out against the regime, or lived abroad and were victims of Gaddafis "physical liquidation" against Libyan diasporas. These would come in the form of public hangings as well as gunfire.

=== Sadek Hamed Shuwehdy ===
One of the most notable Libyan executions was the execution of Al-Sadek Hamed Al-Shuwehdy. Sadek was a Libyan student and aeronautical engineer that had returned from America where he had been studying, and participated in peaceful protests against the Gaddafi regime. He was arrested and detained for several months before his sentencing was made. The regime labeled him as "a terrorist from the Muslim Brotherhood" in order to justify his sentencing. He was then executed in a large basketball stadium with thousands of people watching him from the stands, mostly children who were forced to attend as a school trip.

=== 2010 ===
On May 30, 2010, 18 people were executed by firing squad in Libya, 14 in Tripoli, and the other 4 in Benghazi. Many of those executed were foreign nationals from Chad, Egypt and Nigeria. Cerene, a Libyan newspaper affiliated with Gaddafi's son, Saif al-Islam, stated the men were executed after being convicted of premeditated murder. The European Parliament condemned the executions, and requested that those who were executed be named, with those still in detention given a fair trial and humane treatment.

Amnesty International also condemned the executions, noting their opposition to the death penalty and that foreign nationals were at a disadvantage to getting their sentences commuted due to their financial limitations and lack of family connections. Amnesty's director of Middle East and North Africa, Malcolm Smart, also stated that it was believed by the organization that those sentenced to death were not given fair trials under international law.

== Ethnic cleansing ==
The Gaddafi regime was notorious for its persecution of many ethnic groups, such as the Amazigh, Toubou, and the Tuareg people. The persecution was in the form of ethnic cleansing, which involved banning all Indigenous languages and the demolition of many Berber villages to replace them with Arabs. Gaddafi frequently described these minorities as "the Children of Satan".

=== Banned languages and cultures ===
The Amazigh language was entirely banned by the regime since Gaddafi saw it as an "Imperialist Invention". He declared that anyone who was studying the Amazigh language was drinking "poisoned milk from their mother's breast". Berber activists and people who publicly spoke the Amazigh language were rounded up and jailed. Singing traditional Berber songs landed them in trouble. Those attempting to promote Amazigh culture, heritage and rights were persecuted, imprisoned and killed. Following Gaddafi's "cultural revolution" in 1973, Berber names were entirely banned by the regime, and many were forced to instead take Arabic names.

In 1984, legislation was introduced that de facto banned the language in its promotion of Arabic. Law No. (12) on prohibiting the use of foreign languages and numerals in all transactions mandated the use of only Arabic in the public sphere. Later on, the Gaddafi regime passed an even more restrictive language law: Law No. (24), which prohibited the entire usage of the Amazigh language, which included banning Berber street names, writing on vehicles, buildings, posters, medical prescriptions, and the names of institutions.

In 2012, the Amazigh language became a part of the school curriculum in Zuwara and many other small berber towns, and then was added to the official Libyan school curriculum in 2023.

=== Persecution and Imprisonment of Berber Activists ===
Berber activists were heavily persecuted and suppressed by the Gaddafi regime. Many activists were either arrested and tortured or had assassination attempts carried out against them. Many were even detained for owning books that were written in Tamazight.

Said Mahrooq, a well known Berber activist from the city of Jadu was subject to many incidents of police harassment and torture. He was permanently paralyzed from the waist down and left with a broken skull after being run down by a car on the 21st of February 1979. Many Berber activists accused the regime of purposefully coordinating this attack, because he was followed by the Libyan intelligence on a number of occasions leading to the assassination attempt.

== Torture ==
In 2011, secret documents discovered in Tripoli in the office of Gaddafi's former intelligence chief Moussa Koussa by Human Rights Watch confirmed that the CIA and MI6 had sent terrorism suspects to Libya, where they were tortured. In 2012, Human Rights Watch published a report based upon the interviews of 14 former Libyan detainees that detailed how opponents to Gaddafi's rule were unlawfully rendered to Libya, where they faced torture in Libyan prisons after being tortured at CIA sites, through methods such as waterboarding. This included members of the Libyan Islamist Fighting Group.

According to the leader of the Libyan Islamist Fighting Group, Abdel-Hakim Belhaj, he and fellow leader Sami al-Saadi were tortured in Abu Salim Prison by Libyan interrogators. Belhaj had been kidnapped in Bangkok in 2004 alongside his pregnant wife, Fatima Boudchar, and their four children, and claimed a tip-off from MI6 had led to their capture. Saadi's wife and children were also abducted. They were questioned by British agents, who used information gained under torture to imprison Libyans in the UK. Belhaj stated he was tortured and imprisoned for 6 years, and his wife was also tortured before her release four months after being captured.

During the Libyan Civil War in 2011, Libya's security forces allegedly tortured both rebels and civilians after rebel forces struck the northwest. According to The Observer, Gaddafi was alleged to have given the order to torture Libyans during the war.

Saleh Quosmy, a man who lived in Libya under Gaddifi, recounted the time of his imprisonment, claiming his alleged offense was "...being a member of the Tahrir Party", and that warrantless searches and arrests occurred. He claimed to witness people being hit with objects such as plastic bricks, sticks, and belts during interrogations as a way to attempt to change their views of Gaddafi's regime. After being transferred to the Abu Salim Prison, he claimed that the cells in that facility were of incredibly poor quality, being made of metal with small windows and difficulties with temperature regulation.

== Extrajudicial killings ==
=== Abu Salim Prison massacre ===
The Abu Salim Prison massacre was the mass killing of prisoners that took place on June 29, 1996, killing an estimated 1,270. Before the massacre, prisoners were forced to live in dire and unhealthy conditions, with many forced to eat rotten bug infested food and grass, urinate and drink out of the same cup, live in cells overrun by rats, and were tortured on a normal basis with boulders and batons by security guards. This caused many of the prisoners to catch deadly diseases and fevers. Family visits were also heavily restricted.

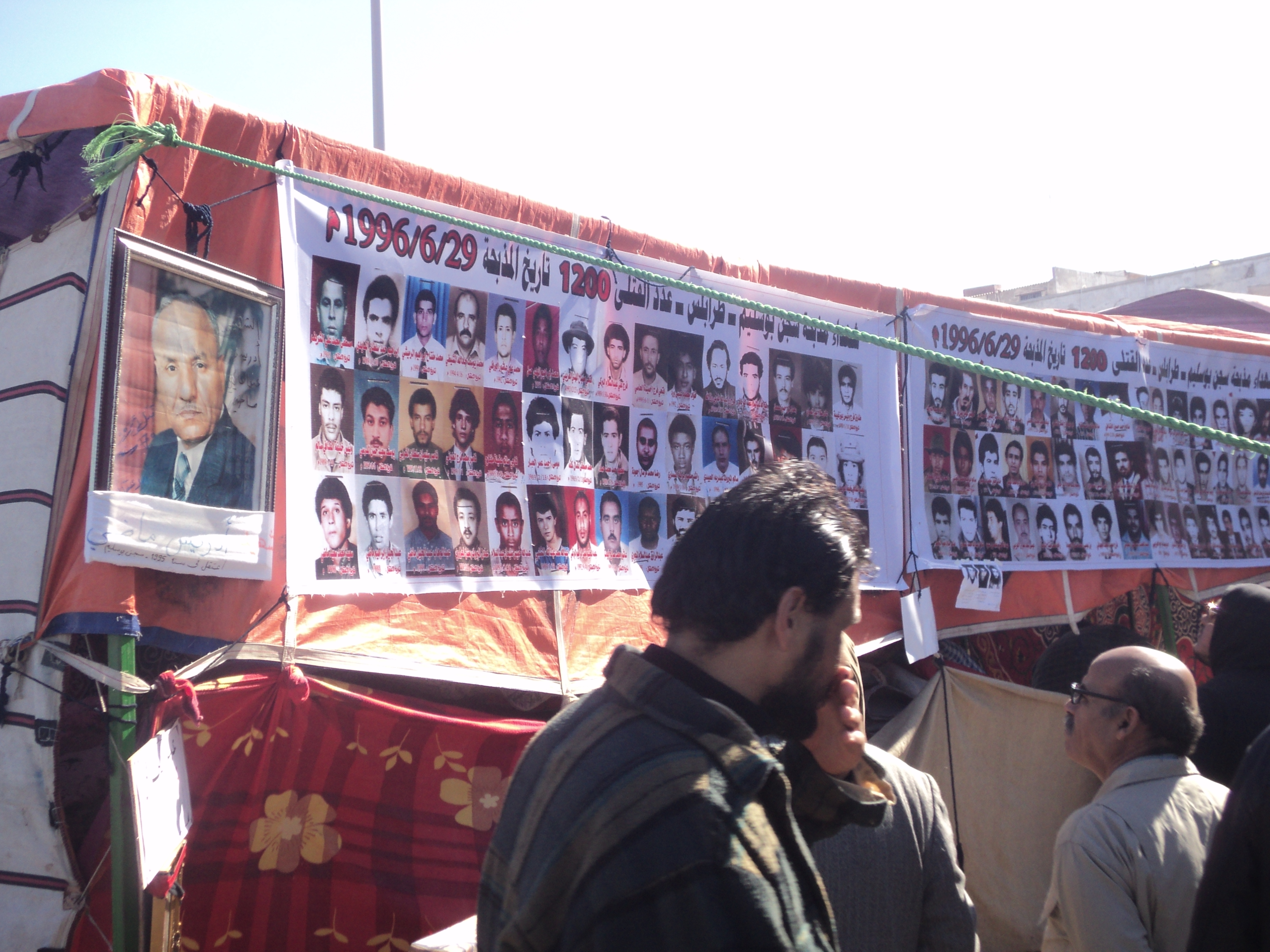
Victims of the Massacre by Gadafi

A prisoner protest then took place because of these harsh conditions and food was distributed among the prisoners by other prisoners. The guards then opened fire, killing six prisoners and wounding 20. Government negotiators, including Abdullah Senussi, then met with prisoner representatives who asked for improved conditions, care for the sick and trials to be made in order to prove the innocence of these wrongfully convicted prisoners. Senussi did not accept to put prisoners on trial, but he agreed to the other conditions, once the captured guard was released. The prisoners agreed. Hundreds of injured and sick prisoners were told they would receive medical care and were taken away in buses. They were never seen again and their whereabouts are unknown to the present day.

The next morning, June 29, many prisoners were rounded up into the courtyards of the central prison, and were shot and killed by gunfire from the rooftops. The survivors of the initial attack were then executed point blank. Eyewitnesses of the massacre stated they heard nonstop gunfire for two hours straight. The bodies of the victims were burnt, and the bones were grounded up and dumped into the sea.

The Gaddafi regime would deny for years that these killings ever occurred.

=== Yarmuk Massacre ===
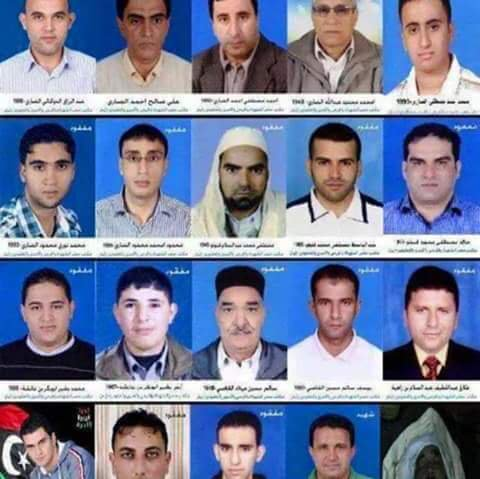
Zliten victims of the Yarmuk Massacre

On August 23, 2011, detainees were held in a warehouse located in the Khalida Ferjan neighborhood in Salahaddin, south of Tripoli, adjacent to the Yarmuk Military Base. The detainees, numbering approximately 153, were almost entirely civilians. These detainees were often beat, electrocuted, starved, and even raped. Guards from the Khamis Brigade conducted a roll call of the detainees and subsequently carried out a vicious attack. Survivors recounted guards opening fire from the roof of the warehouse and throwing grenades into the building. Many detainees were shot and killed during the assault. 53 skulls were later found in one location and other corpses were discovered in a nearby shallow grave but there was a deliberate attempt to destroy victims’ bodies. There are known to be at least 20 survivors. Videos were taken of the site of the massacre, showing the remains of the bodies which were mostly ashes.

Survivors of the massacre provided testimonies of the events. Abdulrahim Ibrahim Bashir, one of the survivors, said he escaped the onslaught by fleeing over a wall while guards were reloading their weapons. He then hid in a nearby house with some other survivors, some of whom were wounded. When they came out after three days of hiding, they noticed the fire, met the rebel brigades, and discovered the site of the incinerator.

Abdulrahim recounted witnessing guards killing wounded detainees and identified one of the perpetrators as a soldier named Ibrahim from Tajura. He also testified to being forced to repeat the Shahada using Gaddafi's name, and to refer to him as god.

== 2011 ==
=== Shooting unarmed protestors ===
When the Arab Spring had reached Libya, thousands of Libyans took to the streets in demand of justice and freedom, as well as free and fair elections to take place. Government troops alongside mercenaries cracked down violently against them, shooting hundreds of unarmed civilians and even crushing them to death using tanks. Hundreds were killed, including many women and children, and thousands were injured in the eastern cities such as Benghazi, Al-Beida, Derna, and Tobruk. Bodies began piling up on the streets, while hospitals overflowed with many being injured and many on the verge of death, with most of being injured as to gunshot wounds in the head, neck, and chest. Eyewitness accounts spoke of tanks crushing civilians in their path. Ambulances were blocked by government troops from entering the place in order to save the lives of the ones who were shot. The same thing happened when protests erupted in Tripoli in solidarity with Benghazi.

According to Luis Moreno Ocampo, then-chief prosecutor of the International Criminal Court, between 500 and 700 civilians were killed by Gaddafi's security forces in February 2011, before the anti-Gaddafi forces had taken up arms.

=== Indiscriminate bombing and shelling of civilian areas ===
Gaddafi forces were also convicted of shelling towns with heavy weapons on almost every city, killing many civilians including women and children. Houses were constantly bombarded and destroyed by Loyalist troops and even hospitals were repeatedly bombed and targeted. Loyalist troops had reportedly targeted civilian vehicles, with one of the attacks killing a mother with her four children, the oldest being 13.

Benghazi was also a common target for bombing civilian infrastructure, during the Second Battle of Benghazi, multiple civilian houses were struck and destroyed. Constant shelling of civilian homes kill dozens of people, including many children.

In Yafran, Gaddafi forces had launched many attacks targeting civilian infrastructure using grad rockets, tanks, and fighter jets. Patients and doctors in Yafran were forced to flee hospitals due to the mass bombing and shelling against. Al-Qalaa had also faced harsh shelling and destruction by loyalists, killing many women and children.

Misrata faced a 4-month siege by Pro-Gaddafi forces alongside mercenaries. Hundreds of civilians were murdered by the bombing and shelling of homes and bakeries. Cluster bombs, illegal under international law, were used to destroy civilian infrastructure and hundreds of rockets were launched on various neighborhoods in the city. The Libyan government also intentionally rerouted the sewage system into the cities water wells, forcing thousands of civilians to drink contaminated water which made them ill, with many catching diseases and putting hundreds of thousands of civilians at risk of death. This constant shelling of civilian infrastructure and resource blockade lasted for months until Misrata was liberated by rebel forces.

=== Rape of women ===
During the war, Gaddafi's forces were accused of rape and sexual torture of hundreds of women and children. Over 8,000 rape cases were reported, with all of them being committed by Gaddafi's forces. Many of these women were stripped naked, raped, and then killed in front of their male relatives.

Captured mercenaries admitted that they were forced by officers to enter homes, tie up and shoot the males, and rape the women and girls alongside Pro-Gaddafi forces.

The girls said nothing, they were tired and they were in bad shape because there were 20 officers before us. It happened in the morning, and lasted about an hour and a half. The officers brought in a music system and listened to pop music, and smoked and danced during the rapes. I want to emphasize that the officers forced us to rape.

— A captured mercenary’s testimony

Libyan psychologist Siham Sergewa conducted various interviews, showing visual proof of how sexual torture was used against Libyan women. Her findings included multiple images of abuse, such as cigarette burns, bite marks, and bruises. Sergewa began investigating after hearing reports from displaced women in Ajdabiya. She conducted a mental health survey among refugees on the Libyan borders with Tunisia and Egypt, receiving 50,000 responses. Out of these, 295 women reported being raped, all attributing the assaults to Gaddafi's soldiers. These women described horrific experiences, including gang rapes and being raped in front of their husbands, who were then killed. Sergewa shared her research with the International Criminal Court.

== See Also ==
- Anti-Berber racism
