= Hachimi Nait-Djoudi =

Hachimi Nait-Djoudi (1946–2001) was an Algerian politician, trained surgeon, Amazigh activist, founding member of the first Algerian League for the Defense of Human Rights, leader of the Socialist Forces Front (FFS) and minister under the presidency of Mohamed Boudiaf.

== Biography ==
Hachimi Nait-Djoudi was born on October 7, 1946, in Djemâa-Saharidj, in Kabylie (Algeria). Trained as a surgeon, he practiced in Algeria and France, at the Ambroise-Paré Hospital (Boulogne-Billancourt).

He joined the Socialist Forces Front (FFS) in 1974, when this party was still underground. In 1980, while he was in France, he actively supported the movement for the recognition of Amazigh identity. Three years later he returned to Algeria where he participated in the creation of the first Algerian League for the Defense of Human Rights. He became Deputy General Secretary.In 1985, he was arrested for his opposition activities. He was brought before the Medea State Security Court, which sentenced him to two years in prison.

== Death ==
He died on Thursday November 29, 2001 at the Salpêtrière Hospital in Paris, during a cardiovascular surgery operation.
