= Berbers and Islam =

History of the Berber people who converted to Islam

The Berbers (autonym: Imazighen) are an indigenous ethnic group of the Maghreb region of North Africa. Following the Muslim conquest of the Maghreb, most Berber tribes eventually became Muslims. Presently, about one-sixth of the population of Maghreb speaks one of the Berber languages (mostly in Algeria and Morocco), but most of them also speak some form of Arabic. Berbers are the first non-Arab people to have established an Islamic state.

== Background ==
Mediterranean North Africa practiced many religions including various forms of pagan rituals, Judaism, and Christianity. The first Islamic forces encountered fierce opposition by the various city-states resulting from the departure of the Byzantines. The weakest of them in the southern and southwestern parts of the Berber territories were the first to fall to the Islamic troops under the Egyptian Caliph in a locally initiated attempt of expansion westward. This first attempt in late 7th century (660 A.D.) resulted in a decisive defeat of the Islamic troops. Berber queen Dihya (or Kahina) led the indigenous resistance to the Muslim conquest of the Maghreb. For five years, she ruled a free Berber state from the Aurès Mountains to the oasis of Gadames (695–700 CE); however, Queen Dihya was killed in combat near a well that still bears her name, Bir al Kahina in Aures.

In 670, the Islamic coalition under the command of Uqba ibn Nafi established its camp on the Tunis peninsula and founded the city of Kairouan, about 160 kilometers south of Tunis. The Muslims used the city as a base for further operations against Numidians in the West and along the highlands of modern Algeria. Successive and repeated attacks on the villages of the lower Numidian agricultural valleys by Abu al-Muhajir Dinar, Uqba's successor, forced the uncoordinated Numidian tribes to eventually work out a modus vivendi through Kusaila, a converted Numidian chief on behalf of an extensive confederation of Christian Berbers. Kusaila, who had been based in Tlemcen, converted to Islam and relocated his headquarters to Takirwan, near Kairouan.

In 750, the caliphs centralized their command in Damascus and a coalition of Islamic forces from Medina, Damascus, Baghdad and Egypt returned in a second attempt following successive defeats in Greece. The Islamic forces in a coalition resumed their conquest of the Mediterranean Sea from the south, through North Africa. A more diplomatic second attempt resulted in a successful alliance with the mainly desert-based Mauretanian tribes (Morocco and western Algeria), then Numidia. The new Muslim northwest African tribes in turn became ambassadors of the Muslim Caliphs, and brokers on their behalf in an attempt to assemble a coalition of forces to engage their common enemy Rome. The new approach was better received by the Numidian tribes of the highlands and were successfully recruited for a joint military venture into Europe (and ultimately to Rome and around the Mediterranean Sea). Tariq ibn Ziyad headed these stronger forces under the green flag of Islam, taking most of the Iberian Peninsula. It is then that North Africa (west of Egypt) was referred to as "al-Maghreb" or the "West" by the peoples of West Asia.

The tolerance of Islamic preachers among the Berbers did not guarantee their support for the Umayyad Dynasty—which held control over most of the Islamic Caliphate. Their ruling proxies alienated the Berbers by taxing them heavily; treating converts as second-class citizens; and enslaving the southern and weaker nomadic tribes. As a result, widespread opposition took the form of open revolt in 739-40 under the banner of Kharijite Islam. The Kharijites had been fighting Umayyad rule in the East, and many Berbers were attracted by the sect's egalitarian precepts. The issue at hand is the same Numidians had fought against with the Romans (State Religion) whereby the control of the faith as an inherited right of those in control of the state. The new sect known as Kharijism was born on the premise that any suitable Muslim could be elected caliph without regard to race, station, or descent from the Islamic prophet Muhammad.

After the revolt, Kharijites established a number of tribal kingdoms in the North African highlands. Their safety was purchased with taxation without representation. A set of Islamic representatives and tax collectors were established as attaches, and known as the Marabouts from the Arabic word "mourabitoun" or attaches whose role was restricted to that of a relay between local tribal council of elders of the tribes (Aarch) and the central authority in Tunis. They had neither mosques nor authority. Their houses served as their quarters and were commonly constructed with a dome above whose Arabic term is qoba and Berber one ta qobe-tt (little dome). Other regions and tribes, however, like Sijilmasa and Tilimsan—which straddled the principal trade routes—proved more viable and prospered. In 750, the Abbasids, who succeeded the Umayyads as the rulers of the Caliphate, moved the caliphate capital to Baghdad and reestablished Islamic authority in Ifriqiya, appointing Ibrahim ibn al-Aghlab as governor of Kairouan. Although nominally serving at the caliph's pleasure, al-Aghlab and his successors, the Aghlabids, ruled independently until 909, presiding over a court that became a center for learning and culture.

To the west of Aghlabid lands, Abd ar-Rahman ibn-Rustam ruled most of the central-west Maghreb from Tahert, southwest of Algiers. The rulers of the Rustamid imamate, which lasted from 761 to 909, each an Ibadi Kharijite imam, were elected by leading citizens. The imams gained a reputation for honesty, piety, and justice. The court at Tahert was noted for its support of scholarship in mathematics, astronomy, and astrology, as well as theology and law. The Rustamid imams, however, failed, by choice or by neglect, to organize a reliable standing army. This major factor, accompanied by the dynasty's eventual collapse into decadence, opened the way for Tahert's demise under the assault of the Fatimids.

Between the 11th and 12th centuries, the Islamized Berber dynasty of the Almoravids (Lempta tribe) spread in western North Africa. They veiled their faces and were feared as skilled camel riders for their extremely quick robberies. They forced Islam on the people of Western Sahara, who were rooted in traditional religious traditions. Other Arab-Islamic Bedouin groups, such as the Banū Hilāl (Sons of the Crescent Moon), subsequently migrated with their families and herds into the territories of the Berber tribes that had not yet been Islamized. Resistance to Islamization varied: many tribes avoided violent conflicts and retreated to the sparsely populated areas of the Sahara.

By the end of the 12th century, Islam had penetrated the Western Sahara and brought the Berber tribes under its influence.

== Berbers in Al-Andalus ==
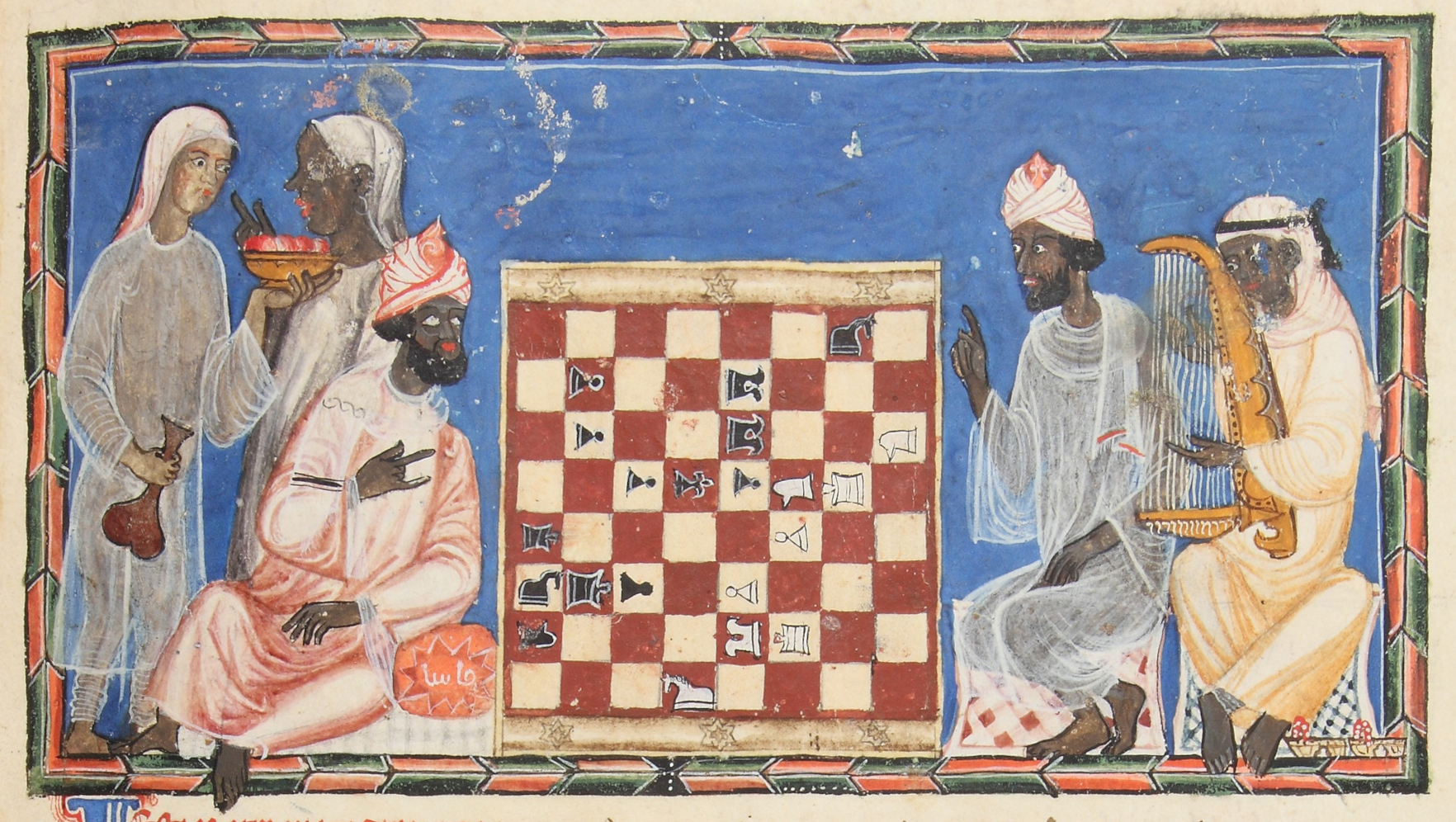
1283 A.D. Miniature from Alfonso X's Book of chess, dice and boards. African Muslims playing chess, with musician and serving women. Europeans loosely called the invading Muslims Moors, blending the name for both people of Arab and Berber ancestry. Among Europeans its meaning shifted from Berber to Muslim of any race. Among Arab speakers in al-Andalus, the word Moors was not used by any group to name itself.

Islamic armies conquered Iberia "under the suzerainty of the Arab Caliph of Damascus Abd al-Malik and his North African Viceroy, Musa ibn Nusayr." The conquest of Iberia consisted of two Islamic troops, crossing the Strait of Gibraltar. The first was led by Tariq ibn Ziyad (thought by researchers to be a Berber) in 711 A.D. A second army led by Musa ibn Nusayr followed in 712 A.D. The Islamic troops comprised approximately 10,000 Berbers and 3,000 Arabs.

Berbers would make up as about 10 percent of Al-Andalusia's population, in the mountainous areas in the north and northwest, and in central Iberia, where they made al-ṭawā’if or (Taifa) kingdoms, including Toledo, Badajoz, Málaga and Granada. They formed "approximately two thirds of the Islamic population in Iberia." After the Abbasid revolution took power away from the Umayyads, Berbers in Iberia may have helped Abd ar-Rahman I establish his Umayyad caliphate in Al-Andalus in 756 A.D., because his mother was a Berber.

During the initial Umayyad conquest of Iberia in 711-712 A.D., Berbers formed their own military units based on tribal allegiances, with little contact with the Arabs. Uthman ibn Naissa, a Berber commander stationed in Cerdanya (eastern Pyrenees), signed an alliance with Odo the Great, duke over Vasconia and Aquitaine, detached himself from central Cordoban rule and shortly established a realm, but was suppressed in 731 by Abdul Rahman Al Ghafiqi.

At this point, Berbers were superficially Islamized and hung onto their traditions with varying degrees of religious assimilation to Islam. Berbers stationed in Galacia may have converted to Christianity. These joined in the Berber revolt in 740-742). Accounts of their siege of Mérida make it clear that they were not Muslims at the time. During the Taifa era, the petty kings came from a variety of ethnic groups; some—for instance the Zirid kings of Granada—were of Berber origin.

The Taifa period ended when the Almoravid dynasty (1085-1145 A.D.) took over Al-Andalus; they were succeeded by the Almohad dynasty (1147-1238 A.D.) from Morocco. The makeup of Al-Andalus at this point consisted of an Arab aristocracy, a Mūlādī population (made of "Muslims of local descent or of mixed Berber, Arab and Iberian origin"), and the Berbers who were situated between the two.

"After the fall of the Caliphate, the Taifa kingdoms of Toledo, Badajoz, Málaga, and Granada had Berber rulers."

== Berbers in the Sahel ==
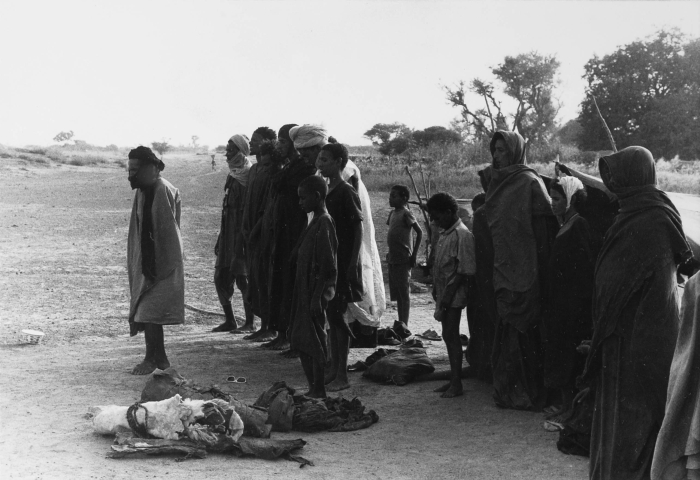
Tuargs performing the Salat

=== The Islamization Process ===
The ancestors of today's Tuareg (from the Arabic word "tawariq = travelers", if etymologically correct) were open to Arab cultural influences, which was especially true of religion. Although this happened in a rather passive, syncretic way, their own traditional ideas lost more and more importance in this acculturation process. Today they are largely assimilated into the Arab-Islamic culture. The explorer and ethnographer Henri Lhote, who wrote a respectable standard work on the Tuareg, wrote in a chapter about the Kel Ahaggar of Algeria and the religious conditions of the Saharan inhabitants:

“Even if, like all new converts, they try to conceal old religious customs, it is nevertheless true that such customs can be recognized here and there.”

It is possible that the Almovarid Agag Alemin, who was a famous Ulama (Quran scholar) and had formed a schoolmaster group around him, was able to give the Tuareg class of the "Islandemen" (sing. "Aneslem", comprising the class of Marabouts) a certain orientation. Nevertheless, the Tuareg remained very passive in the formation of the Islamic faith.

The advance of the European powers accelerated the Islamization of the Saharan-Sahelian region. The Islamic leaders in particular stood up to the colonial administrations. They organized resistance, which culminated in the declaration of the Holy War in 1916 and resulted in the Kaocen uprising in the east and the Firhun (uprising in the west). The Tuareg leaders who took part in this uprising enjoy legendary fame to this day. Due to the lack of unity among the Tuareg tribes, the battles were ultimately lost. In Agadez, the Kaosen uprising in 1917 made it drastically clear that the religious leaders were dangerously influential and that was precisely why they were subjected to a cruel bloodbath.

Although the Quran is considered a "holy book" by the Tuareg, it cannot be denied that access to the book was and still is difficult due to a lack of Arabic language skills. The Nigerian population, who are stuck in a nomadic way of life, speak primarily the Tuareg language Tamasheq and write Tifinagh. Quran schools were and are reserved for young men. Attendance is irregular, as many Tuareg are still nomadic today. Centuries-old mosques exist in Gao, Agadez and Timbuktu, and a few in southern Ahaggar and in the Aïr, but they are not used nearly as much as in other Muslim areas. Most people avoid visiting a mosque. Instead, an area of ground is cleaned and enclosed with a circle of loose stones. This place is then used for religious ceremonies. In these barren conditions, prayers are said facing Mecca. Pilgrimages to Mecca, on the other hand, are mostly rejected because they are seen as purely a matter of prestige. Ramadan is interpreted generously, often with the argument that the people suffer from hunger too often outside of the fasting month or that the Tuareg, as "travellers" (nomads), are free of such duties. Overall, scientists attest that the Tuareg have a superficial relationship to the religion of Islam.

=== Ineslemen (Koran scholars) ===
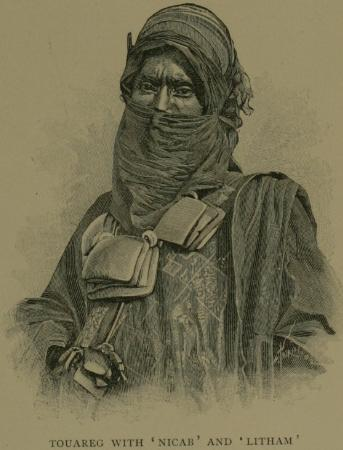
Tuareg from Timbuktu, Mali; hung with amulet bags.

The Tuareg community is still strongly hierarchically structured today. A nomenclature is distinguished that ranges from the "nobles" ("Imajeren") to the "Koran scholars" ("Ineslemen"), "vassals" ("Imrad"), "black farmers" ("Izzegarren" - called "Haratin" by the Arabs) and the "slaves" to the "blacksmiths" ("Inaden").

(Tuareg: Ineslemen, a loan word that means Muslim in Arabic).

The "Ineslemen" correspond to Marabouts, and thus represent the religious class of Koran scholars who were able to gain this position through inheritance or through suitable academic degrees. Their status is comparable to that of the aristocracy ("nobles"). They deal with the exegesis of the Koran and other religious texts. Practical relevance is revealed in setting the date for the departure of camel caravans, at weddings or funerals. They are considered the "people of God" and uphold duties of generosity and hospitality. The Ineslemen earn their living (traditionally food, today money or monetary assets such as goats) from this activity. They also record their experiences in "slips of paper" and deal with magical formulas; these were often sewn into items of clothing or kept in metal containers that were worn as neck amulets. The records also contain instructions for healing purposes (albaraka = blessing); the ink of the written texts is softened with water and given as a drink to the person in need of healing, who then internalizes the texts in a certain way, or the ink is applied to metals and then smoked. The sick person inhales the vapors and subsequently recovers. What the procedures have in common is that they are subject to a high degree of secrecy. Valuable animals (especially camels) are also protected using amulet envelopes. The aim is to banish the devil and his negative power (iblis).

=== Religious Festivals ===
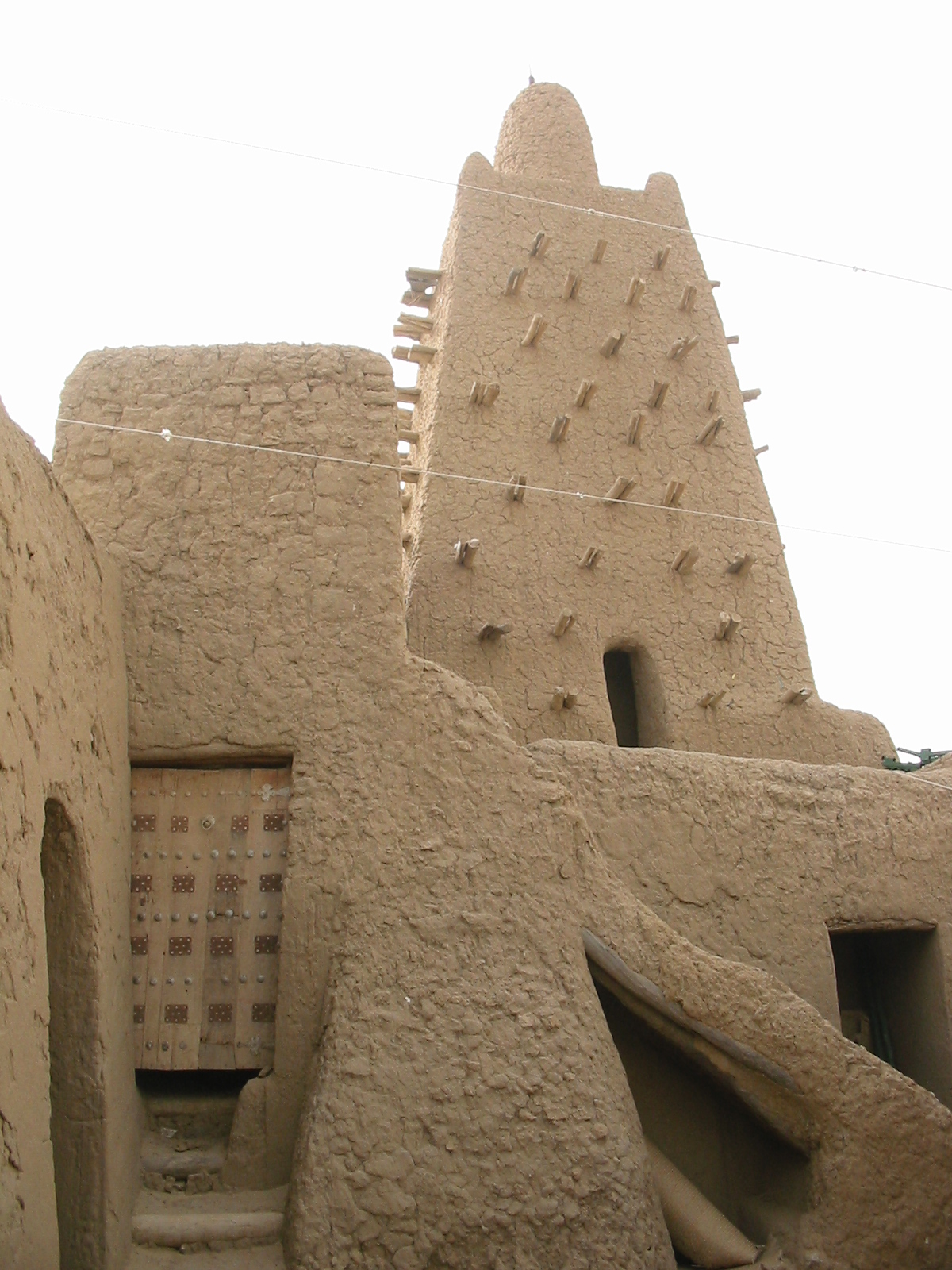
Exterior view of the Djinger-ber Mosque (2005) in Timbuktu. The mosque is attributed to the Andalusian architect Abu Eshaq Es-Saheli al-Touwaidjin from Granada, who built the building in 1325.

The festivals common in Islam are rarely celebrated by the Tuareg, or they are celebrated in a form that deviates significantly from the traditions. For example, Friday prayers on the holy day do not take place in mosques, let alone in a Masjed-e Jāme'. The fasting month of Ramadan is not strictly observed. Events such as Lailat al-Qadr (Night of Destiny ), the Feast of Breaking the Fast ("ʿĪdu l-Fitr"), the Feast of Sacrifice, the Ascension of Mohammed, the Night of Forgiveness ("Lailatu l-Barā'a"), or the "Jalsa Salana" (Festival of Spiritual Edification) are of little importance.

However, a festival that is not regularly celebrated by the rest of the Islamic population is of great importance to the Tuareg: the holiday Mawlid an-Nabi in honor of Muhammad's birthday. Mawlid an-Nabi is celebrated on the 12th day of the month Rabi' al-Awwal of the Islamic calendar, but is rejected by many Muslims as an unacceptable bidʿa (innovation). At best, gatherings take place to tell or hear stories and legends from the life of the Prophet. The mosques are (brightly) lit up. The Tuareg consider it to be the ultimate festival. They call it "mulud". At midnight, crowds of people from all directions stream to special places of worship that have been prepared and planned for the festival. Everyone wears the finest clothing in their repertoire. There is singing and at dawn, daredevil camel rides are demonstrated.

Another important festival is that of male circumcision. The newly circumcised men, around the age of 18, receive their face veils. This paves the way to the male gender role and the cultural values of modesty. Many rituals integrate Islamic and pre-Islamic elements into their symbolism. These include references to the matrilineal line of ancestral women, pre-Islamic spirits, the earth, fertility and menstruation.

The Tuareg worldview allows that the soul (Iman) is more personal than spirits. The souls of the deceased are free. Dead souls can bring messages; in return, services are provided, such as marriage arrangements. The future can sometimes be predicted by sleeping on the graves of ancestors. Ideas about the afterlife (paradise) correspond to those of official Islam.

=== Position of women ===
The position of women in Tuareg society is particularly shaped by traditional cultural values from pre-Islamic times. The social significance of women differs significantly from the usual Islamic traditions. Women enjoy enormous freedom of behavior in their dealings with men and limit the dominance of the male sex. Women have equal rights and are not accountable for where they go and what they do, as long as they do not neglect caring for the family. Research by Henri Lhote (see literature) is said to have shown that there are no requirements for virginity before marriage. There is not even a word for it in Berber usage. Matrilocality and its regulations allow for divorce from an unloved husband. Men can also be subject to property rights that discriminate against them.

Only the inheritance law is interpreted in a more Koranic manner; the son inherits twice as much as the daughter. But these rules are also circumvented by giving away goods during one's lifetime ("alchabus"). Various goods are not transferable at all and can only be used ("ach iddaren"), which means that they remain in the woman's family, provided that matrilocal rules apply here too. This mostly involved farm animals and their milk. By removing them from the cycle of goods and remaining in the maternal line of inheritance, these animals also become the object of "ach ebowel" (milk of the nest).

== See also ==
- Algerianism
- Barbary Coast
- Berber Jews
- Berber Christians
- Berber Spring
- Berberism
- Kabylism
- Moors
