= Badissia novembria =

Badissia-Novembria (Arabic: باديسية نوفمبرية) is a movement composed of a patchwork of conservative ideas, bringing together supporters of Islamism, Arab nationalism, and the denial of the Amazigh dimension of the Algerian people. It also displays an anti-Kabyle rhetoric. Emerging in the context of the Algerian Hirak protests in 2019, its supporters are also openly opposed to progressive and democratic ideas.

The option of a fifth term for President Bouteflika was defeated in the face of popular mobilization at the beginning of 2019. Several debates then swept through society, drawing on historical references to legitimize the various political discourses of the time. The Badissia-Novembria movement, for its part, was led by a conservative minority within the population, most often marginalized within the popular marches of the Hirak.

The Badissia-Novembria movement claims to unite the ideals of the Association of Algerian Muslim Ulema (Islamist-conservative, autonomist, and legalistic during the French colonial period) and those of the Declaration of November 1, 1954 (revolutionary, armed nationalist...). This historical contradiction is, in fact, raised by critics of the Badissia-Novembria movement, who point out that the FLN, which launched the Algerian War on November 1, 1954, was not aligned with the teachings of Ibn Badis. In this sense, Badissia-Novembria practices a form of pro-Islamist revisionism. This movement also opposes the values of the Soummam conference (democratic and social state...).

The movement also targets the Algerian Constitution during its 2020 revision, and more specifically Article 4, which makes Tamazight a national and official language since 2016. It thus hopes for a reversal on the issue of identity. The promoters of Badissia-Novembria share some similarities with the European far right, the latter structuring its discourse around immigrants, while Badissia-Novembria structures its discourse around chauvinism and racism that targets Kabyles. Its supporters also see themselves as defenders of an Algerian state viewed as (solely) "Arab, Novemberian, and Badissian" against the "enemies of the ummah." Many of those responsible for the Badissia-Novembria have been prosecuted by the Algerian judiciary.

== History ==
The Badissia-Novembria movement emerged in April 2019, a few weeks after the start of the Algerian Hirak. It was supported by a conservative segment of the population, often described as being marginalized within the popular marches, and included members of an elite, frequently Arabic-speaking, such as journalists and historians with public visibility, as well as individuals within state structures who shared a common perspective: the promotion of a simplified interpretation of national history, framed as a monolithic narrative centered on an Arab-Islamic identity, and the assertion of a dual heritage combining Abdelhamid Ben Badis’s religious reformism with Algerian nationalism. Among the earliest groups to express support were Islamist organizations, including Hamas, through statements by its leaders Abderrazak Makri and Boudjerra Soltani.These were followed by figures within the government, including Mohamed Djemaï, Secretary General of the FLN.

Participants carried professionally produced placards featuring the portraits of Larbi Ben M'hidi and Amirouche Aït Hamouda. Some participants sought to persuade Ahmed Taleb Ibrahimi to assume leadership of a political transition; following his refusal, they withdrew from the marches. The movement has been particularly visible among students at the Institute of History and has received media coverage.

== Concept ==
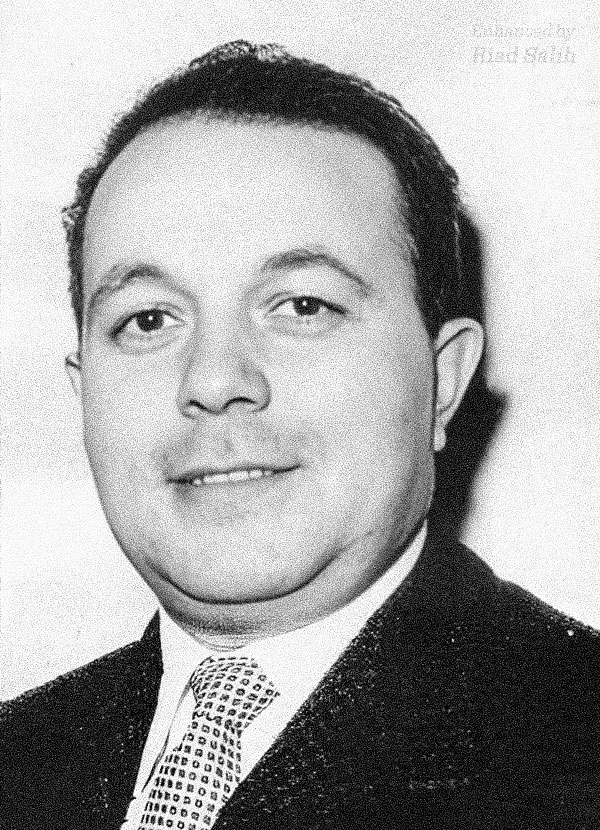
Abane Ramdane, l'artisan du congrès de la Soummam et l'héraut de la « primauté du civil sur le militaire », l'une des revendications phares du Hirak qui le scandait en arabe : « dawla madania mashi ‘askaria »

According to the sociologist Nacer Djabi, Badissia–Novembria, understood as an expression of “latent nationalism,” results from the collision of two distinct and historically divergent realities. The term badissia refers to Abdelhamid Ben Badis—founder in 1931 of the Association of Algerian Muslim Ulema—and to his followers; it evokes a reformist religious current that placed Islam and the Arabic language at the core of national identity, while nevertheless refraining from supporting the November 1954 national uprising against French colonial rule.

In its original usage, badissi designated a follower of Ben Badis who prohibited his wife from visiting the mausoleums of Sufi saints. Novembria, by contrast, refers to the November 1954 uprising itself, which conferred legitimacy on armed struggle. The juxtaposition of the two terms, badissia and novembria, therefore brings together two oxymoronic visions of the national question. During the Hirak movement, supporters of this current marched carrying photographs of Abdelhamid Ben Badis, the historical leader of the ulema, alongside those of Larbi Ben M’hidi (one of the emblematic figures of the Algerian War).

The principle of “civilian primacy over the military,” established at the Soummam Conference in 1956, constitutes one of the central slogans that was widely invoked during the popular marches of the Hirak, notably through the Arabic slogan “dawla madania mashi ‘askaria” (in English: a civil state, not a military one). This demand stood in direct opposition to another, more recent slogan, "Badissia–Novembria", which seeks to reassert military dominance over civilian authority, a power configuration embodied at the time by the Chief of Staff Ahmed Gaïd Salah. This project was supported by reformist Islamist currents, often described as “moderates,” who were receptive to the idea of an alliance that might allow them to shed their historically counter-revolutionary image.

Within this reductionist framework, the primary target of the Badissia–Novembria movement is the Amazigh cultural, historical, identity-based, and linguistic dimension. This dimension is portrayed in a caricatural and demonized manner and, above all, is systematically suspected of separatism. The growing hostility of Islamist actors toward the Amazigh question intensified in the aftermath of the Hirak movement, during which the former Chief of Staff (who died in December 2019) initiated a veritable witch hunt against demonstrators carrying the Amazigh flag. Dozens of individuals bearing the flag were arrested by the security services and sentenced to prison terms once the movement had lost momentum. Ahmed Gaïd Salah thus appeared to encourage increasingly overt attacks against Amazigh identity. This dynamic contributed to the unexpected emergence of the Badissia–Novembria movement, alongside the development of an openly anti-Kabyle hate discourse.

Supporters of Badissia–Novembria reject or actively oppose the Amazigh flag, which they derogatorily refer to as “rayat al-farchitta” (“the fork flag”). The movement is structured around various political actors, notably the Society for Peace Movement, also known by its Arabic acronym "Hamas" (Harakat Mujtama‘ al-Silm). In addition, the Badissia–Novembria current is engaged in a broader policy of denigrating France and promotes the replacement of the French language with English.

Relayed by several Algerian private media outlets, this hate speech specifically targets Algerian Kabyles, exposing them to racist abuse and incitement to violence voiced by Islamist figures such as Naïma Salhi. The so-called “Zero Kabyle operation” openly calls for the ethnic cleansing or imprisonment of Kabyle political leaders, reflecting a broader hostility within extremist circles toward Amazigh populations. These statements were made during a gathering held in Sidi Lakhdar, near Mostaganem, on August 8, 19, and 20, 2019. Such extremist positions stand in sharp contrast to the popular mobilizations of the Hirak movement, during which slogans were expressed in the spoken languages : Tamazight and Algerian Arabic thereby illustrating a sense of unity that transcended linguistic, identity-based, and regional “boundaries".

== Critical ==
Salah Goudjil, President of the Council of the Nation (Senate) since April 2019, has on several occasions expressed criticism of Badissia–Novembria, stating: “When people say that November is Badissi, they are lying to history. November is November; it belongs to no one.” He has received institutional backing in this position from the Council of the Nation.

Similarly, in 2023, Nordine Aït-Hamouda, a former member of parliament, speaking two years after his release from prison in 2021, denounced what he termed “the great Badissia–Novembria hoax.” He criticized those who sought to obstruct the development of Tamazight, despite its recognition by the Constitution as both a national and an official language. He further argued that “it is not insignificant that most online influencers are Islamist and aligned with fundamentalist groups,” and called on Algerians to oppose what he described as the Badissia–Novembria deception.

This current, according to its critics, distorts and reshapes the history of the struggle for national independence. It seeks to associate the outbreak of the Algerian War on 1 November 1954 with the Islamic reformist movement led by Ben Badis, even though the latter’s followers played only a marginal role during the initial phase of the armed struggle (November 1954–January 1956). By contrast, Kabyles accounted for a significant number of the leading figures among the principal initiators of the National Liberation Front (FLN).

== Media and social media ==
This ideology has been amplified through social media, where anonymous, sometimes well-structured, accounts disseminate intolerant and even hateful rhetoric with complete impunity. Faced with this escalation, institutions remain lax, allowing this discourse to become entrenched in public debate; far from being marginal, it gains in audience due to the lack of opposing viewpoints or sanctions. The digital and media space is occupied by proponents of this identity-based vision. His followers employ a populist and reactionary repertoire. They contribute to spreading fake news on a large scale to influence public opinion.

This hostility toward the Amazigh emblem has contributed to the reactivation of previously dormant networks linked to beneficiaries of the Algerian political system, who have sought to exploit the situation to sow division within Algerian society. To this end, they have conducted stigmatization campaigns targeting the emblem, derogatorily labeling it forchita (“fork”), in reference to the red letter ⵣ (Z) of the Tifinagh alphabet displayed on the flag, while disregarding its historical significance. Supported by several public and private media outlets in Algeria, this hate discourse has broadened to include attacks on the dignity of Algerians from Kabylia.

According to Nacer Djabi, this minority movement finds a particular resonance in academia and the media. Anti-Amazigh rhetoric has been amplified and radicalized by members of parliament and politicians with Arabo-Islamist leanings who, on social media and some private television channels, spread anti-Kabyle rhetoric, labeling them "Zouaves" or "traitors to the nation."

== Notable figures and judicial convictions ==
- Some officials who held positions during the terms of former President Bouteflika and who were close to the movement have been charged by the Algerian justice system. These include Generals Abdelhamid Ghriss, Secretary General of the Ministry of National Defense from September 2018 to March 2021, and Wassini Bouazza, head of the Coordination of Algerian Security Services from April 2019 to April 2020, who are believed to belong to the Badissia-Novembria movement. In July 2021, an article in El Watan mentioned a direct link between this movement and high-ranking officers of the People's National Army, during legal proceedings concerning Abdelhamid Ghriss, who was arrested for—notwithstanding allegations of corruption—being a "key player" in the "electronic warfare" conducted under the Badissia-Novembria banner. Wassini Bouazza is even believed to be behind the “Zero Kabyle operation", dubbed “The Meeting of Conscience”. He was sentenced to 16 years in prison and fined 500,000 DZD.
- Mohamed El-Amine Belghit, a history professor, is notorious for his attacks on the Amazigh language and the history of Kabylia. He disputes the essential role played by this region in the war of liberation, going so far as to disparage the Soummam Congress and the commitment of its leading figures, including Abane Ramdane. In the media, Mohamed Amine Belghit defines Tamazight as a "product of a Franco-Zionist conspiracy." On May 3, 2025, he was remanded in custody, charged with "undermining national unity" and "inciting racial hatred" after making these controversial remarks on Sky News Arabia, an Emirati channel. In July 2025, he was sentenced to five years in prison for "undermining national unity." On December 15, 2025, he was pardoned by President Abdelmadjid Tebboune.
- Abdelkader Bengrina, president of the El-Bina movement and close to the Badissia-Novembaria current, does not condemn the statements of Mohamed Amine Belghit and asks President Abdelmadjid Tebboune to obtain his freedom.
- Naima Salhi, another prominent figure in this discourse, is a former member of parliament and the Islamist president of the small Equity and Proclamation Party (PEP). In November 2022, she was sentenced to two six-month prison terms for "incitement to racial hatred" and "undermining national unity." She was also prosecuted for "incitement to murder" against Kabylia. During her trial in October 2022, she defended herself against these accusations, claiming that the word "zouave" was aimed at the MAK movement. In 2017, she had already gained notoriety in a video where she stated that she would "slit the throat" of her daughter if she spoke Tamazight.
- Noureddine Khettal, journalist and activist, is supporter of the Badissia-Novembria movement. A complaint was filed in September 2020 by the family of Lounès Matoub through the foundation bearing the singer's name; two complaints were also filed for other accusations: "damage to the memory of Lounès Matoub," and "defamation and false accusations" .

== Analysis ==
In June 2019, in an article published in El Watan, sociologist Nacer Djabi described the Badissia–Novembria ideology as promoting a form of “regressive nationalism” and drawing parallels with currents of the European far right. Rabah Lounici, a researcher in history, has likewise argued that certain actors within the Algerian authorities play a role in encouraging and structuring the promotion of Badissia–Novembria.

In September 2023, in an article entitled “The Maghreb in the Grip of Identity Fever”, Le Monde highlighted similarities between the Algerian Badissia–Novembria movement, the Moroccan Moorish movement, and the political discourse of Tunisian president Kaïs Saïed. The newspaper raised the question of a possible “emergence of far-right politics in the Maghreb,” while noting that such a categorization remains largely shaped by Eurocentric frameworks. According to historian Karima Dirèche, this phenomenon should rather be understood as a form of intensified nationalism, potentially becoming ultra-exclusive through its rejection of otherness. Publisher Amar Ingrachen, for his part, has argued that the Algerian state “delegates the management of society to an Arab-Islamic orthodoxy, which imposes its norms across various domains, particularly culture and education.” Within this context, the movement is described as developing a discourse with fascist characteristics, identifying an internal enemy in the figure of the “zouave” (colonial auxiliaries of the French army), a category erroneously conflated with Kabyles in this rhetoric.
