= Lucien-Samir Oulahbib =

French sociologist, political scientist, writer and journalist

- Born: 6 March 1956 (age 70); Aïn El Hammam, Tizi Ouzou, Algeria
- Citizenship: France
- Education: Paris-Sorbonne University; Paris Nanterre University; School for Advanced Studies in the Social Sciences; Jean Moulin University Lyon 3
- Occupations: sociologist, political scientist, journalist
- Employer: Jean Moulin University – Lyon 3
- Organization: Atlantis Institute
- Known for: epistemology of nihilism
- Notable work: Ethique et épistémologie du nihilisme
- Website: lucien.samir.free.fr

Lucien-Samir Oulahbib (born 1956, in Aïn El Hammam, Tizi Ouzou, Algeria) is a French sociologist, political scientist, writer and journalist who taught at the University Lyon 3, from 2007 until 2019. He taught at the University Paris X from 2005 to 2007 and now teaches at Albert le Grand Institute. He manages Dogma philosophy journal together with Isabelle Saillot.

His writings tackle contemporary French nihilism, radical Islamism, and antisemitism. Lucien Oulahbib's academic interests range from sociology, political philosophy, philosophy of law, geopolitics, international relations, communication and information philosophy to theology and nihilism.

== Early life ==
Lucien-Samir Oulahbib was born in 1956 in northern Algeria into a Berber Christian family. In 1956, his family with a newborn child emigrated to France at the time of the Algerian War. In 1969 they were reintegrated for French citizenship. His father was the head of a construction company, and his mother was a kindergarten teacher.

Oulahbib is a supporter of the Berber movement, which defends Berber cultural roots against Arab dominance. Many of his works are devoted to this topic.

== Education ==
L.-S. Oulahbib holds a master's degree in sociology and economics from the Paris Nanterre University (1984) under the direction of Jean Baudrillard; M.A.S. (1985) under the direction of Jean Baechler (Paris IV Sorbonne), François Bourricaud (Paris IV) and Alain Besançon (EHESS).

PhD in historical sociology (Paris IV Sorbonne, 1997): "Murderers of Man: contemporary nihilism in France", under the direction of professor Jean Baechler. Habilitation to conduct research in political science (Lyon III, 2007): “Evaluation of the form of politics in the democratic era", under the direction of professor Jean Paul Joubert.

== Career ==
Oulahbib was a host at the free radio Canal 75 and was a reporter, an editor of Magazine Sans Nom, Citizen K, Technikart. He also worked as a freelance journalist for Esprit Critique, Dogma, Marianne and Tumulte.

Since 2000 he teaches political science, sociology, moral and political philosophy, geopolitics, international relations, communication, media and public opinion analysis at the Jean Moulin University Lyon 3. Lucien Oulahbib's research interests have a wide range from sociology and political philosophy to theology and nihilism.

He devotes much attention to the analysis of the philosophy of French nihilists: Bataille, Blanchot, Foucault, Derrida, Deleuze, Lyotard, Baudrillard, and Bourdieu. He calls their work "anti-rational nihilism", saying that they desire to prevent an understanding of the world.

He was influenced by French thinker Jean Baudrillard, who was his scientific supervisor in graduate school and later became a close friend. Oulahbib believes that Baudrillard's book, The Consumer Society (1970 in French, 1998 in English), is a groundbreaking work that is still relevant. Since 2020, Oulahbib has been teaching Reading workshops: "The consumer society of Jean Baudrillard" at Le Collège Supérieur (Lyon).

== Publications ==
- Ethique Et Épistémologie du Nihilisme: les Meurtriers du Sens. L'Harmattan. 2002, 399 p. (ISBN 2747529908)
- Le Nihilisme Français Contemporain Fondements Et Illustrations. L'Harmattan. 2003, 164 p. (ISBN 2747539121)
- La philosophie cannibale: la théorie du mensonge, de la mutilation, ou l'appropriation totalitaire chez Derrida, Deleuze, Foucault, Lyotard. La Table Ronde. 2006, 218 p. (ISBN 2710327392)
- Méthode d'évaluation du développement humain. L'Harmattan. 2006, 176 p. (ISBN 2747595544)
- Le monde arabe existe-t-il ? : Histoire paradoxale des Berbères. Éditions de Paris, 2007, 214 p. (ISBN 2851622145)
- Actualité de Pierre Janet : En quoi est-il plus important que Freud pour les sciences morales et politiques. L'Harmattan. 2009, 268 p. (ISBN 2296083226)
- Le politiquement correct français: épistémologie d'une crypto-religion. L'Harmattan. 2012, 152 p. (ISBN 2296993168)
