= Arabized Berber =

Inhabitant of the Maghreb region in northwestern Africa

Arabized Berbers are Berbers whose language is a local dialect of Arabic and whose culture is Arab culture, as a result of Arabization.

The widespread language shift from Berber to Arabic happened, at least partially, due to the privileged status that the Arabic language has generally been given in the states of North Africa, from the Arab conquest in 652 up until the French colonialism in the twentieth century, as well as the migration of the Banu Hilal and Banu Sulaym tribes from Arabia to North Africa. The centuries-long Arab migration to the Maghreb from the 7th to the 17th century played a significant role in Arabizing the native Berber population in addition to changing the population's demographic breakdown.

== Arabization of the Berbers ==
The Arabization of the native Berber population was a result of the centuries-long Arab migration to the Maghreb which began since the 7th century, in addition to changing the population's demographics. The early wave of migration prior to the 11th century contributed to the Berber adoption of Arab culture. Furthermore, the Arabic language spread during this period and drove Latin into extinction in the cities. The Arabization took place around Arab centers through the influence of Arabs in the cities and rural areas surrounding them.

The migration of Banu Hilal and Banu Sulaym in the 11th century had a much greater influence on the process of Arabization of the population. It played a major role in spreading Bedouin Arabic to rural areas such as the countryside and steppes, and as far as the southern areas near the Sahara. It also heavily transformed the culture in the Maghreb into Arab culture, and spread Bedouin nomadism in areas where agriculture was previously dominant. These Bedouin tribes accelerated and deepened the Arabization process, since the Berber population was gradually assimilated by the newcomers and had to share with them pastures and seasonal migration paths.

By around the 15th century, the region of modern-day Tunisia had already been almost completely Arabized. As Arab nomads spread, the territories of the local Berber tribes were moved and shrank. The Zenata were pushed to the west and the Kabyles were pushed to the north. The Berbers took refuge in the mountains whereas the plains were Arabized.

== See also ==
- Maghrebis
- Berbers and Islam
- Berbers
- Maghreb
- Muslim conquest of the Maghreb
