= Divide and conquer =

Strategy in politics and sociology

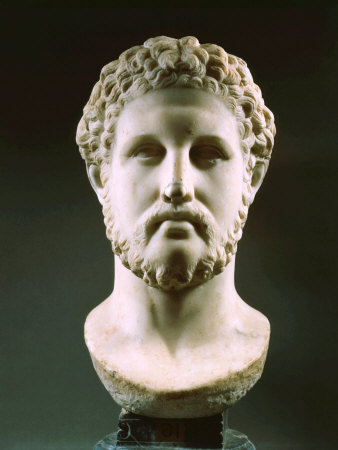
Tradition attributes the origin of the motto to Philip II of Macedon: Ancient Greek: διαίρει καὶ βασίλευε diaírei kài basíleue, meaning "divide and rule"

The term divide and conquer in politics refers to an entity gaining and maintaining political power by using divisive measures. This includes the exploitation of existing divisions within a political group by its political opponents, and also the deliberate creation or strengthening of such divisions.

== Definition ==
The concept primarily refers to the practice of creating divisions between opponents to prevent them from uniting against a common foe, allowing the one who divides to gain or maintain political control. As a maxim, it is commonly recommended to political rulers. A secondary usage of the idea refers to the practice of "dividing one's own forces or personnel so as to deal with different tasks simultaneously." The exact wording of the idiom in English is varied, including divide and rule (mainly in British English but rarely used), divide and conquer (in American, the most common variation), divide and govern, and divide so that you may rule.

== Etymology ==
The phrase "divide and conquer" (from the Latin divide et impera, literally divide and rule) first appeared in English around 1600.

Edward Coke denounces it in Chapter I of the Fourth Part of the Institutes of the Lawes of England, reporting that when it was demanded by the Lords and Commons what might be a principal motive for them to have good success in Parliament, it was answered: "Eritis insuperabiles, si fueritis inseparabiles. Explosum est illud diverbium: Divide, & impera, cum radix & vertex imperii in obedientium consensu rata sunt." ("You would be invincible if you were inseparable. This proverb, Divide and rule, has been rejected, since the root and the summit of authority are confirmed by the consent of the subjects.")

In a minor variation, Sir Francis Bacon wrote the phrase as separa et impera in a letter to James I of 15 February 1615. James Madison made this recommendation in a letter to Thomas Jefferson of 24 October 1787, which summarized the thesis of Federalist No. 10: "Divide et impera, the reprobated axiom of tyranny, is under certain (some) qualifications, the only policy, by which a republic can be administered on just principles."

Divide et impera is the third of three political maxims in Immanuel Kant's Perpetual Peace (1795), Appendix I, the others being Fac et excusa ("Act now, and make excuses later") and Si fecisti, nega ("If you commit a crime, deny it"): Kant refers to these tactics when describing the traits of “despotic moralists."

== Politics ==
In politics, the concept refers to a strategy that breaks up existing power structures, and especially prevents smaller power groups from linking up, causing rivalries and fomenting discord among the people to prevent a rebellion against the elites or the people implementing the strategy. The goal is either to pit the lower classes against themselves to prevent a revolution, or to provide a desired solution to the growing discord that strengthens the power of the elites.

The principle "divide et impera" is cited as a common in politics by Traiano Boccalini in La bilancia politica.

=== Economics ===
In economics, the concept is also mentioned as a strategy for market segmentation to get the most out of the players in a competitive market.

== Historical examples ==
=== Roman Empire ===
In his history of the Gallic Wars, Commentarii de Bello Gallico, Julius Caesar narrates the following episode:

Ipse Diviciacum Haeduum magnopere cohortatus docet necesse esse manus hostium distineri, ne cum tanta multitudine uno tempore confligendum sit.

Translated into English, this reads:

He made a powerful and a personal appeal to Diviciacus the Aeduan, showing him how important an advantage it was for the Roman state, and for the welfare of both parties, to keep the contingents of the enemy apart, so as to avoid the necessity of fighting at one time against so large a host.

The Gauls were a people who shared a language and culture but were politically independent from one another, being separated into a number of tribes. Their interests frequently being at odds, and with existing populations being disrupted by large-scale migrations of other peoples being commonplace, warfare between the tribes was endemic; mostly simmering at a low level in the form of constant raids, but occasionally erupting in paroxysms of violence which saw entire cities laid waste and their populations dispersed or enslaved. For this reason the tribes frequently had bitter hatred for the others.

These weaknesses — the lack of centralized political authority and the resultant animosity between the tribes — were relentlessly and systematically exploited by Caesar during his conquest of Gaul. Caesar used a system of incentives and punishments to ally with some tribes and intimidate others, ensuring that he was only ever fighting one opponent at a time. He carefully presented himself as a defender of Gallic interests, and his military actions as aimed only at hostile tribes who threatened the peace and stability of Gaul. Neighboring tribes often agreed with his assessment, viewing those he assailed as deadly foes who had all too often plagued them, rather than as fierce potential allies in the wars to come. Many even supplied Roman forces with grain or auxiliary troops, or even offered the use of their towns as permanent bases for legionaries.

Eventually, though, there could be no mistaking Caesar’s true motive: not pacification, but conquest. The Gauls realized that they were on the verge of becoming a conquered people without ever having fought a war in their defense.

In response they elected Vercingetorix of the Arverni to lead the unified Gallic resistance with the goal of expelling the Romans from Gaul. Although Vercingetorix was a leader of an exceptionally high caliber, banding together the disparate tribes as had never been done, and enforcing discipline and order on a people who never known either; and despite his innovative strategy of continual retreat before the superior legions, burning or destroying all food that they left behind them denying Caesar the set-piece battle he desired, Vercingetorix eventually erred. Harried by the Romans, he and his forces sheltered in the walled city of Alesia. Caesar entrapped them within a double ring of defensive fortifications: one to keep Vercingetorix and his army confined, the other as protection against the relief army that was sure to come, and the Romans waited.

In the subsequent Battle of Alesia, Caesar's legions won such a crushing victory that Gallic resistance to Roman rule was no longer possible. Vercingetorix rode into the Roman camp alone and silently fell at the feet of Caesar, laying down his arms in token of submission in what Plutarch described as “the most famous surrender in antiquity.” The rest of the tribes followed, and they were integrated as the province of Roman Gaul. The region was eventually organized into the Tres Galliae (Gallia Belgica, Gallia Lugdunensis, and Gallia Aquitania) alongside the older Gallia Narbonensis.

=== Mongol Empire ===
While the Mongols imported Central Asian Muslims to serve as administrators in China, the Mongols also sent Han Chinese and Khitans from China to serve as administrators over the Muslim population in Bukhara in Central Asia, using foreigners to curtail the power of the local peoples of both lands.

=== British India ===
Some Indian historians and politicians, such as politician Shashi Tharoor, assert that the British Raj frequently used this tactic to consolidate their rule and prevent the emergence of the Indian independence movement, citing Lord Elphinstone who said that "Divide et impera was the old Roman maxim, and it should be ours." A Times Literary Supplement review by British historian Jon Wilson suggests that although this was broadly the case, a more nuanced approach might be closer to the facts. On the other hand, Proponents of Hindutva, the ideology of the current and recent Indian governments over the years, strongly stress Hindu-Muslim conflict going back centuries before the arrival of the British.

The classic nationalist position was expressed by the Indian jurist and supporter of Indian reunification Markandey Katju, who wrote in the Pakistani paper The Nation in 2013:

Up to 1857, there were no communal problems in India; all communal riots and animosity began after 1857. No doubt even before 1857, there were differences between Hindus and Muslims, the Hindus going to temples and the Muslims going to mosques, but there was no animosity. In fact, the Hindus and Muslims used to help each other; Hindus used to participate in Eid celebrations, and Muslims in Holi and Diwali. The Muslim rulers like the Mughals, Nawab of Awadh and Murshidabad, Tipu Sultan, etc. were totally secular; they organised Ramlilas, participated in Holi, Diwali, etc. Ghalib's affectionate letters to his Hindu friends like Munshi Shiv Naraln Aram, Har Gopal Tofta, etc. attest to the affection between Hindus and Muslims at that time. In 1857, the ‘Great Mutiny’ broke out in which the Hindus and Muslims jointly fought against the British. This shocked the British government so much that after suppressing the Mutiny, they decided to start the policy of divide and rule (see online "History in the Service of Imperialism" by B.N. Pande). All communal riots began after 1857, artificially engineered by the British authorities. The British collector would secretly call the Hindu Pandit, pay him money, and tell him to speak against Muslims, and similarly he would secretly call the Maulvi, pay him money, and tell him to speak against Hindus. This communal poison was injected into our body politic year after year and decade after decade.

Historian John Keay takes a contrary position regarding British policy, writing:

Stock accusations of a wider Machiavellian intent to 'divide and rule' and to 'stir up Hindu-Muslim animosity' assume some premonition of a later partition. They make little sense in the contemporary context. 'Divide and rule' as a governing precept supposes the pre-existence of an integrated entity. In an India politically united only by British rule – and not yet even by the opposition which it generated – such a thing did not exist. Division was a fact of life. As Maulana Muhammad Ali would later put it, 'we divide and you rule'. Without recognising, exploring and accommodating such division, British dominion in India would have been impossible to establish, let alone sustain. Provoking sectarian conflict, on the other hand, was rarely in British interest.

General S.K. Sinha, former Vice-Chief of Army Staff, writes that contrary to what the notion of divide and rule would predict, the British Indian Army was effectively integrated:

The undivided army was a unique institution set up by the British in India... [A]ll combat units, except Gorkhas and Garhwalis, had a mixed combination of Muslims and non-Muslims. They fought wars together and lived as friendly comrades in peace, owing loyalty to their regiments. Political developments with the emergency of the Congress and the Muslim League did not affect them. The Indian Army was totally apolitical till June 3rd 1947... In fact, during the Partition holocaust and till that date, both Muslim and non-Muslim soldiers remained totally impartial in dealing with communal violence. After June 3, 1947 things started changing.

=== French Algeria ===
The Kabyle myth was a set of beliefs and interpretations propagated during the French colonial era of Algeria by French and occasionally other European writers, based on a belief of fundamental distinction between the Arab and Kabyle peoples, consisting of differences between them centered primarily around religion and culture. These beliefs were highly fluid, often contradictory, and were not uniform in nature. In many, especially early writings, Kabyles were often portrayed by European writers as having an identity and culture closer to Mediterranean or European societies, while in later writings, especially those following the Mokrani Revolt in 1871, discourse surrounding the Kabyles shifted to them being depicted as violent and inferior, alongside colonial justification for the repression and atrocities carried out by French colonial forces. The myth emerged in the early to mid 19th century with French colonialism in Algeria, positing that the Kabyle people were more predisposed than Arabs to assimilate into "French civilization", and its nature would often shift thinker-to-thinker or time period to time period.

French depiction of an attack during the Mokrani revolt. The text below says "The Kabyles creep in like wild animals"

This myth was largely based off the Roman influence in the region of Kabylia. When the Roman Empire controlled North Africa, the region of Kabylia was integrated into Roman provincial life. By the 3rd-5th centuries, Kabylia was influenced by the Roman Empire, especially through the spread of Christianity and Roman culture. Christianity declined in North Africa after the Muslim conquest of the Maghreb. However, Kabylia’s mountainous geography meant many communities stayed relatively independent and less arabized than the rest of North Africa. When the French Conquest of Algeria happened, French thinkers developed the Kabyle Myth, as they argued that Kabyles were less influenced by Islam and closer to Europeans, later exaggerating these European/Kabyle connections to separate the Kabyles from the broader Algerian Identity, create a group more aligned with France, and use them as intermediaries in colonial administration.

=== Ottoman Empire ===
The Ottoman Empire often used a divide-and-rule strategy, pitting Armenians and Kurds against each other.

=== Europe ===
- Athenian historian Thucydides in his book History of the Peloponnesian War claimed that Alcibiades recommended to Persian statesman Tissaphernes, to weaken both Athens and Sparta for his own Persian's benefit. Alcibiades, suggested to Tissaphernes that 'The cheapest plan was to let the Hellenes wear each other out, at a small share of the expense and without risk to himself.
- Tacitus in Germania. chapter 33 writes "May the tribes, I pray, ever retain if not love for us, at least hatred for each other; for while the destinies of empire hurry us on, fortune can give no greater boon than discord among our foes."
- In Revolutions of 1848, the governments which were being revolted against used this tactic to counter the rebels.
- The colonial authorities in British Cyprus often stirred up the Turkish minority in order to neutralize agitation from the Greek majority. This policy intentionally cultivated further animosity between the already divided Greek majority and the Turkish minority (which consists of 18% of the population) in the island that remains divided to this day after an invasion by Turkey to establish the state of North Cyprus (which is only diplomatically recognized by Turkey).
- The partition of Ireland in 1921 has been claimed as an intentional implementation of this strategy by David Lloyd George, although the religious divisions in Ireland were notorious and of long standing. The Stanford historian Priya Satia claims that the partition of Ireland was in ways a patch-test for the partition of India in 1947.

=== Colonialism ===
According to Richard Morrock, four tactics of divide and rule practiced by Western colonialists are:

1. The manufacture of differences within the targeted population;
2. The amplification of existing differences;
3. The use of these differences for the benefit of the colonial empire; and
4. The carry over of these differences into the post-colonial period.

== Foreign policy ==
=== United States ===
Some analysts assert that the United States is practicing the strategy in the 21st-century Middle East through their supposed escalation of the Sunni–Shia conflict. British journalist Nafeez Ahmed cited a 2008 RAND Corporation study for the U.S Armed Forces which recommended "divide and rule" as a possible strategy against the Muslim world in "the Long War".

=== Israel ===
Professor Avner Cohen, a former Israeli religious affairs official, publicly acknowledged that Hamas was "Israel's creation." Similar statements have been made by Yasser Arafat.

Assertions of Israeli support for Hamas date back to the late 1970s and early 1980s, a period marked by significant political upheaval in the Middle East. Former Israeli officials have openly acknowledged Israel's role in providing funding and assistance to Hamas as a means of undermining secular Palestinian factions such as the Palestine Liberation Organization (PLO). Brigadier General Yitzhak Segev, who served as the Israeli military governor in Gaza during the early 1980s, admitted to providing financial assistance to the Muslim Brotherhood, the precursor of Hamas, on the instruction of the Israeli authorities. The aim of the support was to weaken leftist and secular Palestinian organizations.

Israel contributed to the construction of parts of Islamist politician Ahmed Yassin's network of mosques, clubs, and schools in Gaza, as well as the expansion of these institutions.

Shlomo Brom, retired general and former deputy to Israel's national security adviser, believes that an empowered Hamas helps Israeli Prime Minister Netanyahu avoid negotiatings over a Palestinian state, suggesting that there is no viable partner for peace talks. Bezalel Smotrich, a far-right lawmaker and finance minister under Netanyahu Government, called the Palestinian Authority a "burden" and Hamas an "asset".

=== Russia ===
Some consider that contemporary Russian affairs also have characteristics of a "divide and rule" strategy. Applied domestically to secure Vladimir Putin's power in Russia, it is used abroad in Russian disinformation campaigns to achieve "regime security, predominance in Russia’s near abroad, and world-power status for Russia".

== See also ==
- Soft power
- Hard power
- International relations
- Political realism
- False flag
- Destabilisation
- Identity politics
- Black propaganda
- Might makes right
