= Anti-Berber racism =

Hostility, hatred, prejudice, or discrimination against Berbers

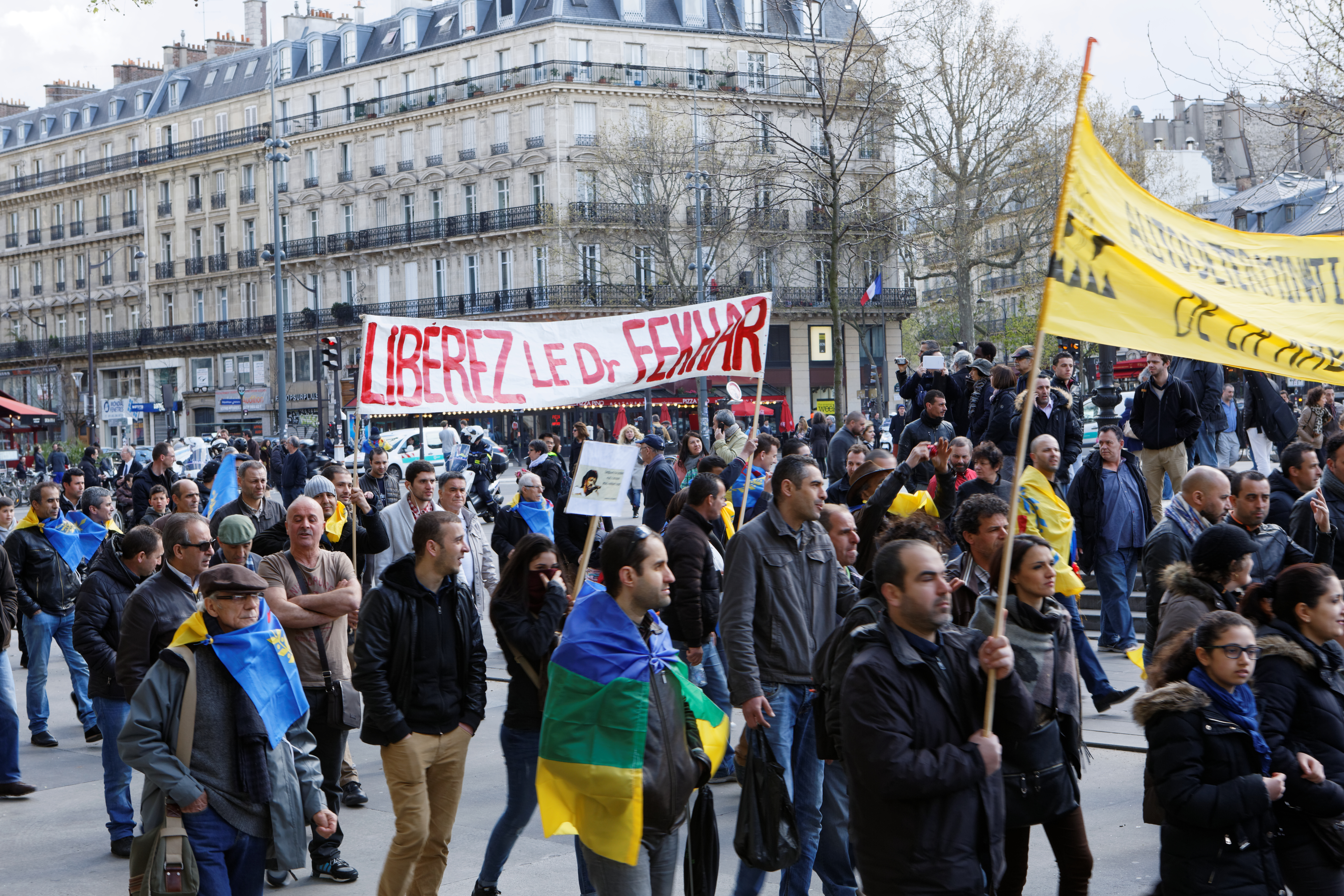
Kabyles protesting for their rights during the "Nuit Debout" protests in Paris, 2016.

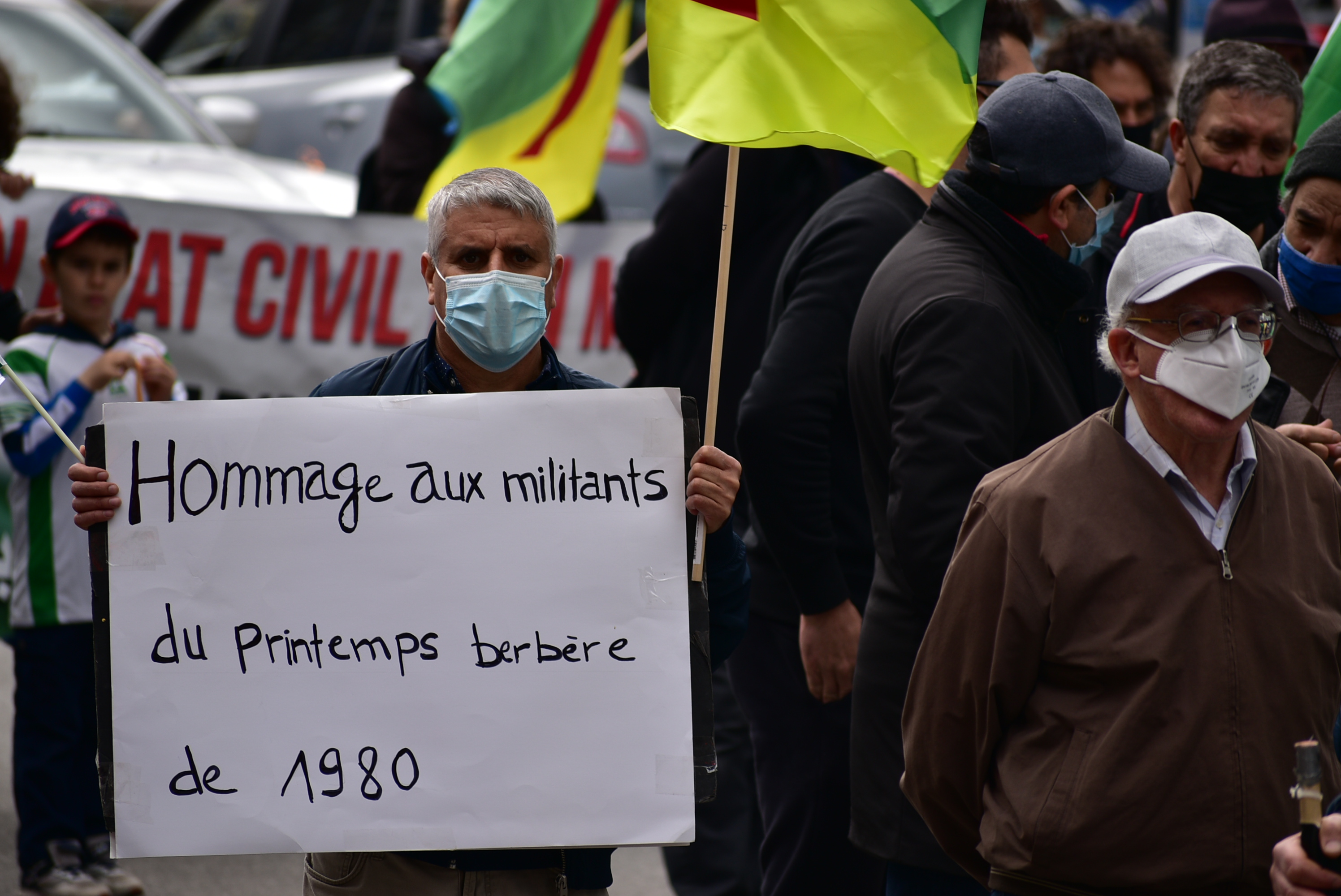
Tribute to the militants of the Berber Spring during the Hirak protests in 2021.

Anti-Berber racism, also known as Anti-Amazigh racism, Anti-Berberism, Berberophobia or Anti-Berber sentiment refers to the acts of hostility, hatred, prejudice or discrimination against Berbers.

== History ==
=== Algeria ===
In 1949, a crisis erupted within the Movement for the Triumph of Democratic Liberties which was the main Algerian independentist movement at the time. This crisis was caused by a disagreement between the militant of the movement. While the leadership of the movement defined Algeria as Arab and Muslim, many Kabyle militants accused them of wanting to erase the Amazigh dimension of Algeria.

After the independence, president Houari Boumediene pursued a policy of arabization by imposing Arabic as the language of administration and school. This led, in the 80s, to the foundation of the Berber Cultural Movement. Following its creation, the government tried to discredit the movement, declaring that Berber was a "colonial creation" and that "it is not a language because it has no grammar, because it has not writing".

In 1980, protests known as the Berber Spring erupted following governmental measures seen as discriminatory against Berbers. During this event, 128 protesters were killed by the police and thousands were injured or arrested.

From September 1994 to April 22, 1995, a school and university boycott movement led by the Berber Cultural Movement and affected schools and universities in the Béjaïa, Tizi Ouzou and Bouira provinces. It was organized in order to promote the teaching of Berber languages in schools.

On April 19, 2001, Massinissa Guermah, a Kabyle student, was assissinated by a gendarme in Ait Douala. Three days later, 3 students were arrested by gendarmes in Amizour. These events were the cause of the Black Spring, which led to the death of 130 Kabyles and the foundation of the Movement for the Self-Determination of Kabylia by Ferhat Mehenni.

On June 12, 2021, the FLN senator Abdelouahab Benzaim made statements targeting the Kabyle people by accusing them of being responsible for "all of Algeria's problems" and by referring to them as a "tumor" and suggesting that they should be "eliminated" in the name of national unity.

In November 2022, the Islamist MP Naima Salhi was sentenced to two six-months prison terms for "incitement to racial hatred". In a video recorder in 2018, she incited to the murder of Kabyles.

=== Mali ===
In Mali, Tuaregs have long faced discrimination. Following the successive rebellions in the 1990s, 2000s and 2010s, many Tuaregs have been associated with separatist movements and were suspected of supporting them on the basis of their ethnicity. Human rights organizations have documented arbitrary arrests, executions and other abuses committed against Tuareg civilians by Malian forces.

According to Patricio Asfura-Heim, the Tuaregs "have had poor relationships with state governments and claim to have been systematically marginalized, both politically and economically".

During the 1990s, several sources reported that the paramilitary group Ganda Koy targeted Tuareg populations and allegedly committed massacres against Tuareg civilians with the help of the Malian Armed Forces.

In 2013, Asfura-Heim reported that some villages organized violent "spontaneous or less spontaneous pogroms" targeting Tuaregs. The same year, several incidents resulted in the deaths of Tuareg civilians. On 19 February, three members of the Imrad clan were killed by the army near Gao. In April, five Tuareg men suspected of links to an Islamist group were captured and injured before dying in Bamako Central Prison after being denied medical treatment. On 26 and 28 May, 14 Tuareg pastoralists were severely beaten and had their cattle stolen. On 28 November, five demonstrators were "gravely injured" and one killed by the army.

=== Tunisia ===
Since the independence of the country in 1956, the successive governments promoted an Arab and Muslim national identity while the Amazigh identity remained marginalized. In May 1959, the decree-law n°59-53, restricting the registration of non-Arabic given names was promulgated. Despite being abolished in July 2020, several municipalities continued to refuse the registration of Amazigh first names.

=== Libya ===
During Muammar Gaddafi's rule in Libya, the Berbers population experienced repression. They were prohibited from using their language in public spaces and practicing their culture. Berber languages were also excluded from official education. The regime promoted an Arab nationalist ideology and the expression of Amazigh identity was portrayed as foreign and as a result of European imperialism. Various cultural practices including traditional festivals and Berber names were banned. In addition, several Amazigh activists were arrested or killed by the regime.

== See also ==
- Berbers
- Racism in the Arab world
