= Naima Salhi =

Algerian politician

Naima Salhi is an Algerian politician. Salhi is president of the Equity and Proclamation Party (PEP). She was elected to the People's National Assembly in the 2017 legislative elections. Naima Salhi, was member of parliament and the president of the small Equity and Proclamation Party (PEP). She was elected MP for Boumerdès in 2017. A first complaint was filed by activist Salim Chaït in 2019, but it was blocked by her parliamentary immunity, which was only reactivated with the dissolution of the assembly in 2021. She is close to the political movement known as badissia novembria.

== Controversy ==
In November 2022, she was sentenced to two six-month prison terms for "incitement to racial hatred" and "undermining national unity." She was also prosecuted for "incitement to murder" against Kabylia. During her trial in October 2022, she defended herself against these accusations, claiming that the word "zouave" was aimed at the MAK movement. In 2017, she had already gained notoriety in a video where she stated that she would "slit the throat" of her daughter if she spoke Tamazight.

On May 1, 2019, she attempted to participate in a march in Djelfa in support of maintaining the process leading to the presidential election of July 4; she was ultimately chased out of the city by the protesters. In 2019, she also criticized one of the heroines of the Algerian war, the independence activist Djamila Bouhired whom she accused of being in the pay of France.
