= Kabyle myth =

French colonial interpretation trope propagated in French Algeria

The Kabyle myth was a set of beliefs and interpretations propagated during the French colonial era of Algeria by French and occasionally other European writers, based on a belief of fundamental distinction between the Arab and Kabyle peoples, consisting of differences between them centered primarily around religion and culture. These beliefs were highly fluid, often contradictory, and were not uniform in nature. In many, especially early writings, Kabyles were often portrayed by European writers as having an identity and culture closer to Mediterranean or European societies, while in later writings, especially those following the Mokrani Revolt in 1871, discourse surrounding the Kabyles shifted to them being depicted as violent and inferior, alongside colonial justification for the repression and atrocities carried out by French colonial forces. The myth emerged in the early to mid 19th century with French colonialism in Algeria, positing that the Kabyle people were more predisposed than Arabs to assimilate into "French civilization", and its nature would often shift thinker-to-thinker or time period to time period.

French depiction of an attack during the Mokrani revolt. The text below says "The Kabyles creep in like wild animals"

This myth was largely based off the Roman influence in the region of Kabylia. When the Roman Empire controlled North Africa, the region of Kabylia was integrated into Roman provincial life. By the 3rd-5th centuries, Kabylia was influenced by the Roman Empire, especially through the spread of Christianity and Roman culture. Christianity declined in North Africa after the Muslim conquest of the Maghreb. However, Kabylia’s mountainous geography meant many communities stayed relatively independent and less arabized than the rest of North Africa. When the French Conquest of Algeria happened, French thinkers developed the Kabyle Myth, as they argued that Kabyles were less influenced by Islam and closer to Europeans, later exaggerating these European/Kabyle connections to separate the Kabyles from the broader Algerian Identity, create a group more aligned with France, and use them as intermediaries in colonial administration.

== History ==
While elements can be traced to the writings of Abbé Raynal and precolonial travelers, the myth was seriously elaborated by French colonists between 1840 and 1857. It emerged largely in the writings of French military men, such as Baron Aucapitaine and Adolphe Hanoteau. The Kabyle myth was diffused between 1860 and 1871, reaching its climax between 1871 and 1892 before finally being abandoned as a basis for social policy in 1915.

The French colony came to consider the Kabyle population more prepared to assimilate into French civilization "by virtue of the supposed democratic nature of their society, their superficial Islamicization, and the higher status of Kabyle women," as well as the belief that they were ancient Christians, of Celtic origin, who could easily be re-Christianized.

Among the proponents of this myth was the French officer Baron Aucapitaine, who claimed: "In one hundred years, the Kabyles will be French!" Camille Sabatier, a colonist theorist of "Berber separatism" and racist, claimed that the qanuns (customary laws) of the Kabyles came from someone who was "not of the family of Mohamed and Moses but of that of Montesquieu and Condorcet."

Eugène Daumas and Paul-Dieudonné Fabar published in 1847: "Beneath the Muslim peel, one finds a Christian seed. We recognize now that the Kabyle people, partly autochthonous, partly German in origin, previously entirely Christian, did not completely transform itself with its new religion ... [The Kabyle] re-dressed himself in a burnous, but he kept underneath his anterior social form, and it is not only with his facial tattoos that he displays before us, unbeknownst to him, the symbol of the Cross" (Daumas and Fabar 1847: I, 77).

== Political Implementation ==
The concept named "berbère" influenced multiple policies in an effort to further assimilate the Kabyle peoples. For example, in the 1880s education efforts were greatly increased in Kabylia. They were also favored in recruitment for the Zouave colonial army, while the White Fathers attempted to convert them to Christianity.

== Legacy ==
An analogous dichotomy played out in the Berber policy of the French protectorate in Morocco (1912–1956). According to Edmund Burke III, who described it as "one of the most enduring aspects of the French sociology of Islam, the myth and its supposed Arab-Berber dichotomy was fundamental to colonial discourse in North Africa, and its impact shaped postcolonial political discourse as well.

Alfred Rosenberg's 1930 book The Myth of the Twentieth Century, a touchstone of Nazi philosophy, includes the Berbers in with the Nordic Aryans.

== See also ==
- Crémieux Decree
- Divide and rule
  - Salami slicing tactics
  - Pre-independent Rwanda and the origins of Hutu, Tutsi and Twa groups
  - Wedge issue
  - Goralenvolk, a Nazi attempt to split the Polish nation
- Évolué
- Model minority
  - Model minority myth
