= Berber Spring =

Period of political protest in Algeria

- Part of the history of Algeria (1962–99)
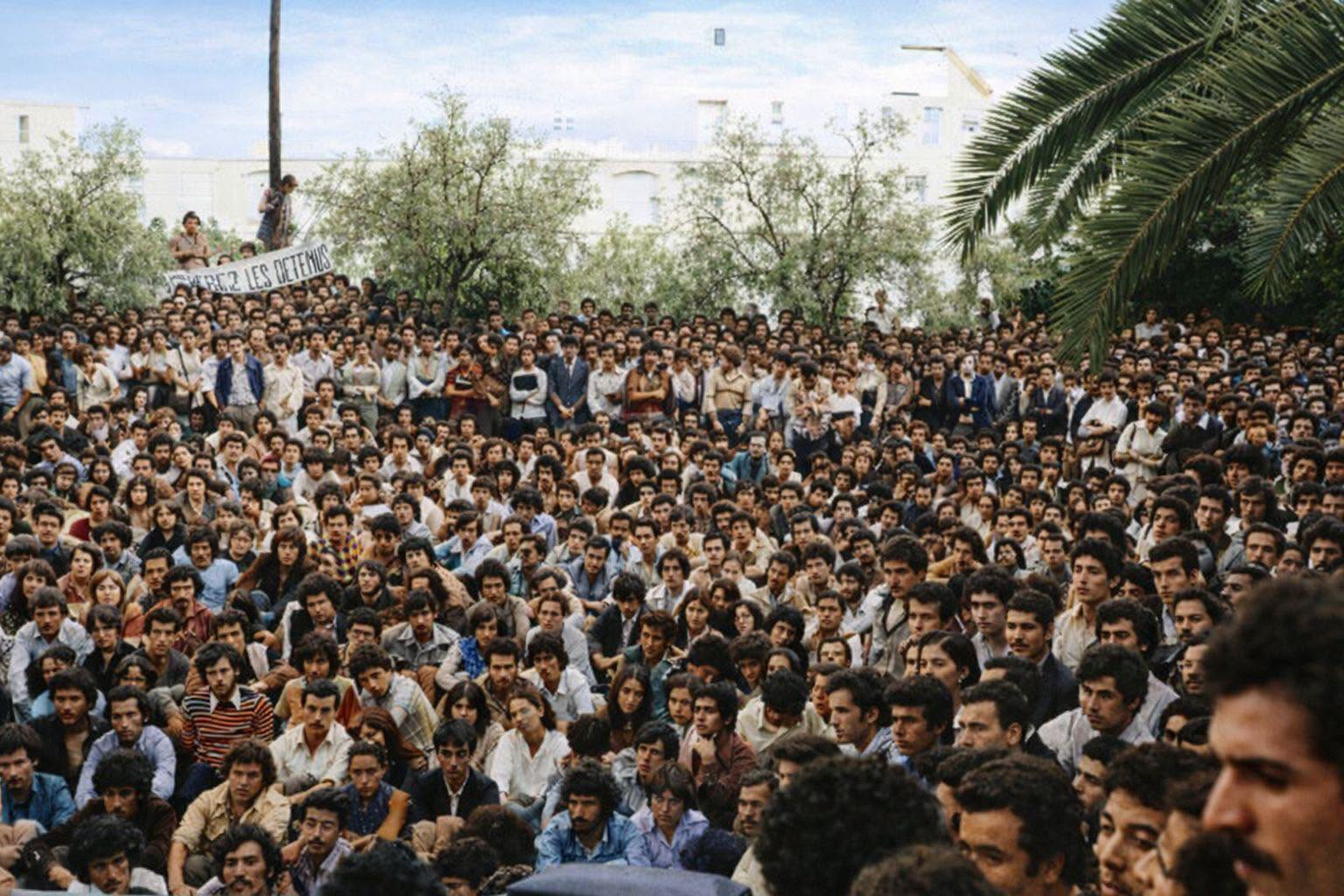
- Colorized photo of a protest in Tizi-Ouzou in April 1980.
- Date: 10 March – 20 April 1980
- Location: Kabylia
- Caused by: Arabization
- Goals: End to the suppression of the Berber languages and culture
- Methods: Demonstrations, general strike
- Result: Violently repressed; Creation of the Berber Cultural Movement

Parties
Kabyles; Berber Academy	Algeria; FLN; Armed Forces

Lead figures
Mouloud Mammeri	Chadli Bendjedid; Mohamed Ben Ahmed Abdelghani

Casualties and losses
128 killed Thousands injured	

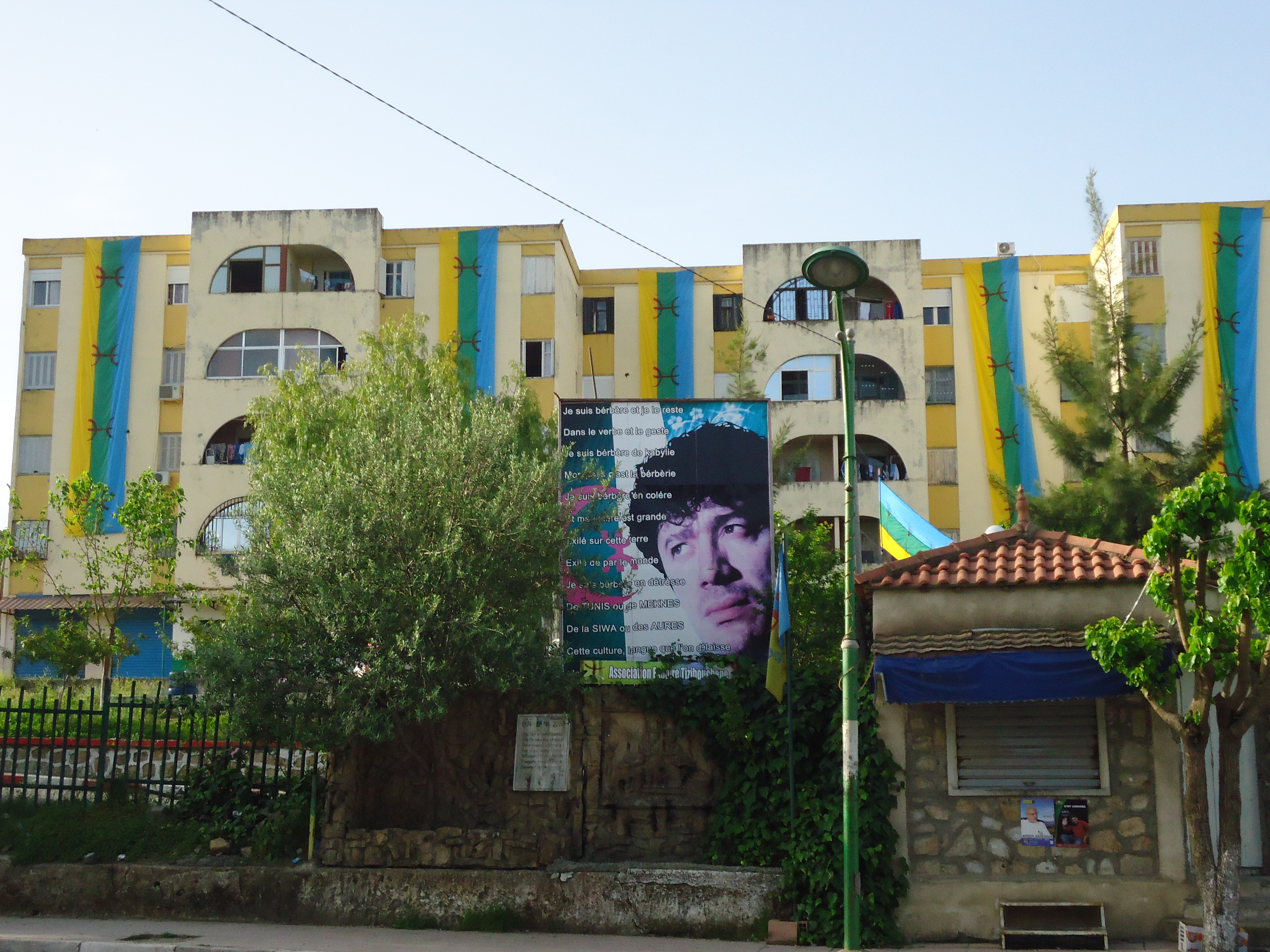
Celebration of the 36th anniversary of the Berber Spring in Azazga.

The Berber Spring (Tamazight: Tafsut Imaziɣen or simply Tafsut for "Spring") was a period of political protest and civil activism in 1980, claiming recognition of the Amazigh identity and language in Algeria, with events mainly taking place in Kabylia and Algiers.

== Background ==
=== Arabization measures ===
Since its independence in 1962, Algeria had a single-party system, ruled by the FLN. After 132 years of French colonization, one of the goals of the Arab nationalist party FLN was to implement Arabization measures with the goal of making Arabic the national language in administration, schools and public services in general. Like most ex-colonies, the independence of Algeria stressed the need for a linguistic and cultural "recovery", as a symbol of the nation's "recovery". Under French colonization, the Arabic language was disregarded; in 1938, the French government even issued a law that declared Arabic a foreign language in Algeria. In reaction to the French policies, the nation-building project envisioned by the Algerian nationalist and pro-independence party, the FLN, made it so that Algeria would be a monolingual Arab and Muslim country, with little consideration for the pluralism of cultures, identities and languages in Algeria. For example, the 1976 National Charter did not take into account any Berber claims for recognition.

This rejection of the Berber identity, language and culture is to be put in a context where approximately 10 to 12 million Algerians are Berbers. Kabylia is the region with the highest concentration of Berbers. Located in northern Algeria, it has approximately 7 million inhabitants.

=== Berber cultural organizations ===
During the 1960s and the 1970s, several Berber cultural organizations emerged in Paris, for they could not be established in Algeria. At that time, there were many exchanges between Algeria and France, and despite being based in Paris, these organizations also targeted Kabylia's inhabitants. The Berber, and more specifically the Kabyle, identity was already a political cause. For example, Mouloud Mammeri had created the Académie Berbère d’Echanges et de Recherches Culturelles (ABERC) with other intellectuals, that emphasized the similarities between the minorities in Algeria.

== Events ==
The Berber Spring is traditionally dated as beginning on 10 March 1980, with the Algerian government's cancelling of an academic lecture on Berber Poetry Hasnaoua University in Tizi-Ouzou organized by the Kabyle intellectual Mouloud Mammeri that sparked the out pouring of unrest. This event sparked demonstrations and strikes at schools, universities and businesses that would rock the Kabyle region for more than two months. This period is known as the "Berber spring" or Tafsut Imaziɣen. This event was the first great popular movement to challenge the authorities, the FLN and the single-party system since Algeria's independence. A critical point was the coordinated arrest of hundreds of Berber activists, students and doctors on 20 April, sparking a general strike.

- 10 March: Mouloud Mammeri's conference about ancient Kabyle poetry is cancelled in Hasnaoua University in Tizi-Ouzou.
- 11 March: demonstrations in Kabylia at Tizi Ouzou, Bejaia and Algiers.
- 7 April: violent suppression of a demonstration in Algiers shocked and the beginning of the strike in Tizi-Ouzou and Bejaia
- 10 April: general strike in Kabylia. Bejaia, Tizi Ouzou.
- 17 April: forced eviction of the strikers from the Tizi-Ouzou hospital and the SONELEC factory.
- 19 and 20 April: Mizrana operation: authorities enter the Kabylia Tizi Ouzou university.
- 20 April: general spontaneous strike in Tizi-Ouzou and Bejaia.

According to Jane Goodman, the Berber Spring could not have happened if not for the conjunction of four dynamics: the Arabization program that “criminalized” the Berber identity; a small network of Berber scholars in Paris in the 1970s; the student governance in Algerian universities that allowed for the organization of the demonstrations; and the “human rights discourse” in the media, fueled by the violent repression.

While the Berber Spring was in the end violently suppressed by the Algerian authorities, it created a lasting legacy for Kabylie and the Berbers across North Africa. Many of today's prominent Kabyle politicians and activists made their name during the Berber Spring events, and organizations such as the Rally for Culture and Democracy (RCD) and the Berber Cultural Movement (Mouvement Culturel Berbère – MCB) were later created by activists of the Spring. The Spring was also an important event for Algeria's nascent human rights community, including outside Berber circles.

== Aftermath ==
Since the dismantling of the one-party FLN system in 1989—followed by abortive democratization and civil war—a few of the demands of the Berber Spring have been met by the state. In 2016, the Berber language was made an official language of Algeria, alongside Arabic. Other points of contention remain.

Since January 2011 massive Berber activism re-emerged in North Africa in the wake of the Tunisian revolution and the overthrow of the Tunisian president Ben Ali, in what Berbers sometimes call the Berber-Arab Spring. This time, Berber activists were much more active and vocal on the streets of Morocco and Libya compared to Algeria. In Libya, Berber rebels helped topple Muammar Gaddafi, as the offensive that captured Tripoli and greatly helped end the civil war there originated from the Berber Nafusa Mountains.

== See also ==
- Black Spring (Kabylie) - 2001
- Arab Spring - early 2010s
