= List of oral repositories =

Examples of oral repositories

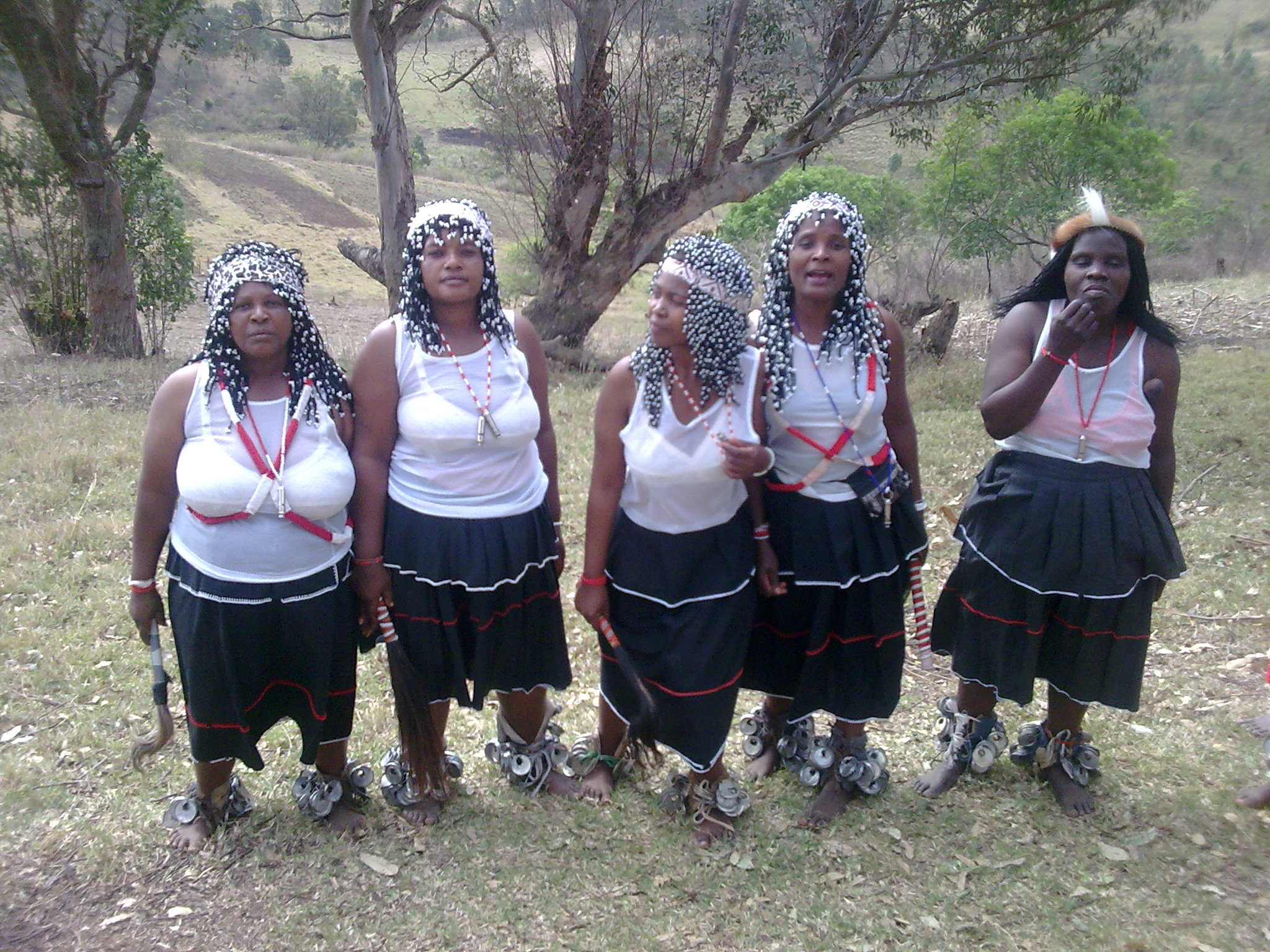
Five sangomas in KwaZulu-Natal, South Africa

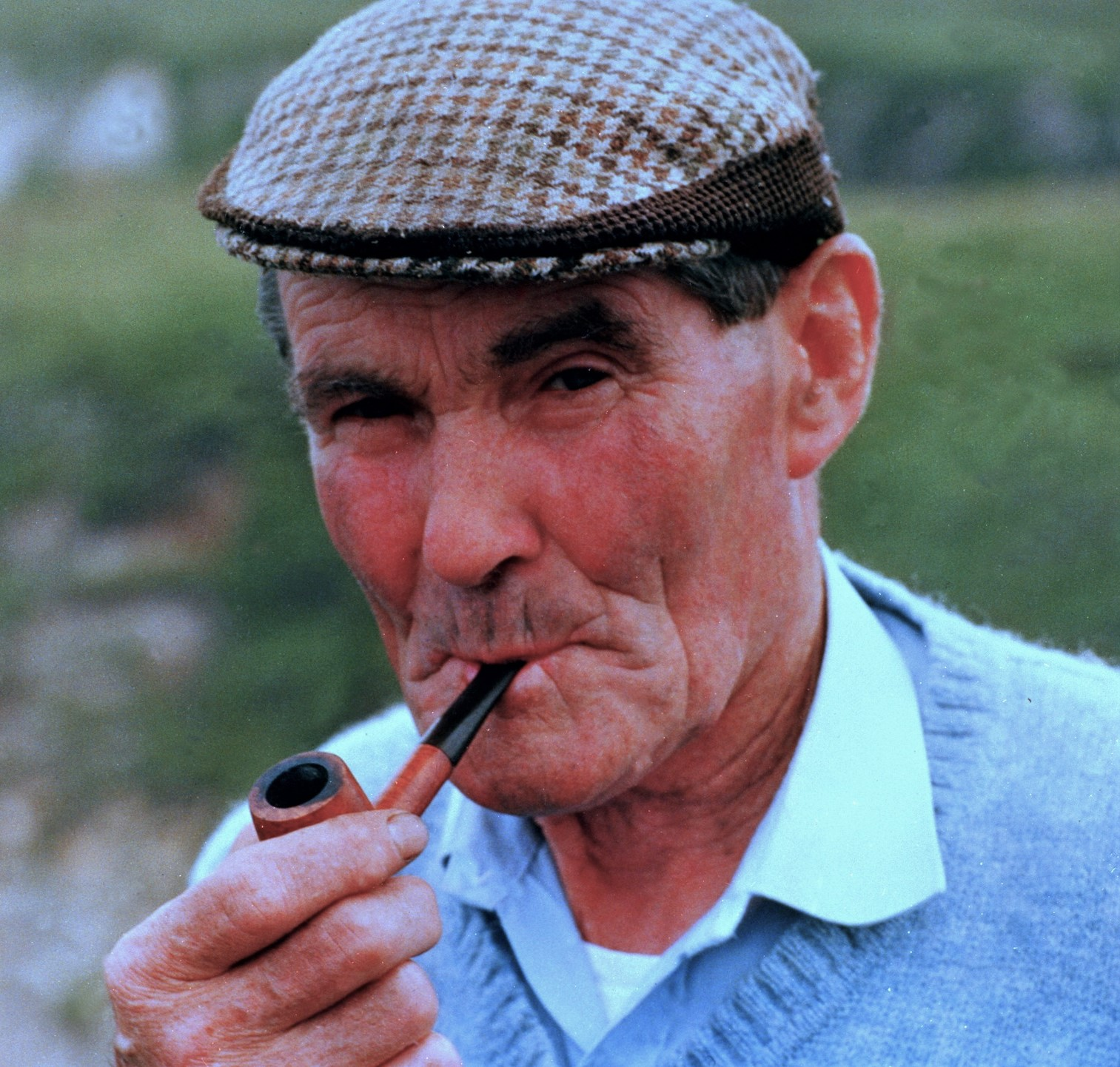
Seán Ó hEinirí, seanchaí from Mayo, Ireland

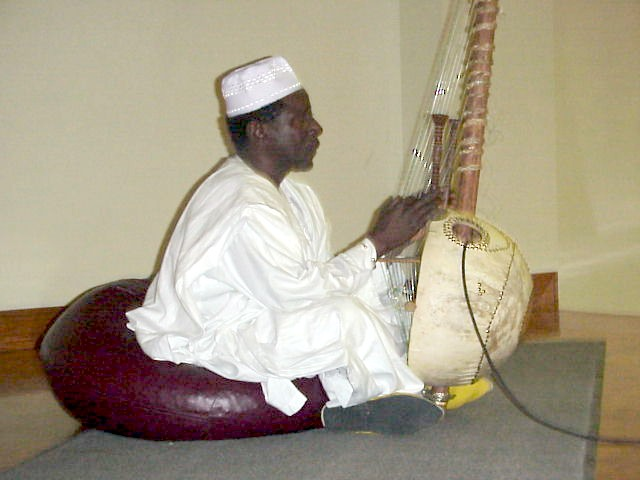
Mandinka jeli Al-Haji Papa Susso performing songs on the kora from the oral tradition of the Gambia

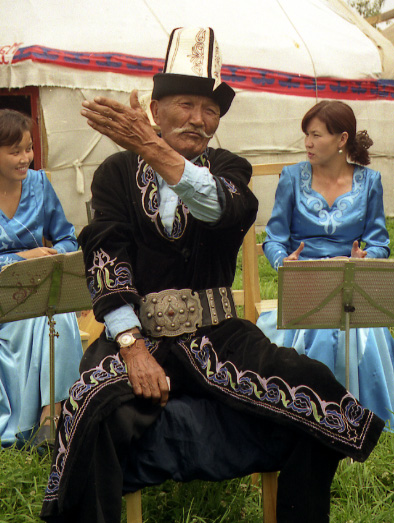
A manaschi performing the Epic of Manas in Karakol, Kyrgyzstan

Oral repositories are people who have been trusted with mentally recording information constituting oral tradition within a society. They serve an important role in oral cultures and illiterate societies as repositories of their culture's traditional knowledge, values, and morals.

== Roles ==
People termed as "oral repositories" have been likened to "walking libraries", leading to the saying "whenever an old man dies, it is as though a library were burning down". Roles vary, and can be titular, formal or informal, some professional specialists such as the Caucasian ashik, or more commonly amateurs and knowledgeable generalists such as the bulaam of the Kuba people.

Types of information held by oral repositories include lineages, oral law, mythology, oral literature and oral poetry (of which oral history is often entwined), folk songs and aural tradition, and traditional knowledge. In many indigenous societies, such as Native American and San, these roles are fulfilled in a general sense by elders. In some societies anyone could become a generalist or traditionalist regardless of their social class, and acquisition depends solely on individual aptitude, while in others the roles are hereditary and dependent on class or caste.

These people usually hold authority within their respective societies, although musicians sometimes constitute a low caste/class. They can be religious figures playing roles in rituals and ceremonies. With regard to narrative traditions, they usually perform from their repertoire and apply their distinct style while innovating on a well-known tale or work, seeking to create an experience by leading, involving, and responding to the audience. Some participate in improvised poetry competitions such as the Central Asian aytysh, the North African Kabyle people's amusnaw, the Spanish repentismo, or the West African Ewe people's halo. In parts of the world they remain as custodians of culture despite rising literacy rates.

== Africa ==
Term	Type/s of information	Society/ies	Period	Sources
Abacurabwenge	Genealogy	Rwandan		
Abasizi	Poetry/panegyrics	Rwandan		
Abateekerezi	Royal memoirs	Rwandan		
Abiru	Code of kingship	Rwandan		
Akewi	Poetry, eg. oríkì	Yoruba	To present	
Akomfo	Religious lore	Akan	To present	
Arókin (griot)	General	Yoruba	To present	
Amdyaz	Poetry	Berber	To present	
Amusnaw	General, eg. asefru	Kabyle		
Anechchad	Songs	Berber	To present	
Azmari	Poetry and songs	Amharic		
Babalawo	Religious lore	Yoruba	To present	
Bambudye/Mbudye	General	Luba	To present	
Bulaam	History, literature, and poetry	Kuba	To present	
Debtera	Religious lore	Ethiopian and Eritrean		
Gawlo (griot)	General	Fula and Toucouleur	To present	
Gesere/Jaare (griot)	General	Soninke	To present	
Géwël (griot)	General	Wolof and Serer	To present	
Halaiqui	Literature	Moroccan	To present	
Iggiw/Ighyuwn/Iggawen (griot)	General	Hassaniya	To present	
Imbongi	Poetry	Southern African, eg. Xhosa and Zulu	To present	
Jèli/Jali (griot)	General	Mandinka, Dyula, Mossi, and Bambara	To present	
Hogon	Religious lore	Dogon	To present	
Maalem	Songs, religious lore	Moroccan	To present	
Mahosi	General	Venda	To present	
Maroka (griot)	General	Hausa	To present	
Mbomo mvet	Songs and literature	Fang	To present	
Mganga	Religious lore	Swahili		
Mmoki	Poetry	Tswana	To present	
Moaridi	History	Kuba		
Moreti	Poetry	Bapedi	To present	
Mpikabary	Public speaking	Merina	To present	
Mukhodi	Poetry	Venda	To present	
Muphati	Poetry	Tsonga	To present	
N'anga	Religious lore	Shona	To present	
Ndzio	Poetry, song	Tio		
Nganga	Religious lore	Kongo	To present	
Oday	General, law	Somali	To present	
Ogbu Avu	General	Igbo	To present	
Okyeame	General	Akan		
Omwevugi	General, eg poetry	Banyankore and Bahima	To present	
Sangoma	Religious lore, general	Nguni, Sotho, and Tsonga	To present	
Sarungano	Literature	Shona	To present	
Seroki	Poetry, genealogies	Sotho	To present	
Svikiro	Religious knowledge	Shona		
Ughoro	General	Edo		
Ugogo	Literature (ntsomi or izinganekwane)	Xhosa and Zulu	To present	

== Asia ==
Term	Type/s of information	Society/ies	Period	Sources
Aqyn	Poetry and songs	Kazakh and Kyrgyz		
Ashik/Ashugh	Poetry and songs	Azerbaijani, Turkish, Georgian, and Armenian		
Babaylan	Religious lore	Filipino	Until 20th century	
Bagshy	Literature	Turkmen	To present	
Baxshi	Poetry	Uzbek	To present	
Bhanaka	Religious texts	Asian (Buddhist)	Until 1st century BCE	
Bhāts	Genealogy, sometimes poetry and storytelling	Indian		
Bobohizan	Religious knowledge	Kadazan-Dusun (Malay)	To present	
Bomoh	Religious knowledge	Malay and Sumatran	To present	
Charan	General, eg. Rajasthani and Gujarati literature	Rajasthani, Gujurati, Baloch, and Sindhi		
Dalang	Literature	Indonesian	To present	
Dastango	Literature	Pakistani	Until 20th century (revived)	
Dengbêj	Literature and songs	Kurdish		
Dukun	Religious knowledge	Malay and Indonesian	To present	
Gayen/Gain	Poetry	Bengali		
Gusans	Poetry	Armenian		
Hakawati	Literature	Arab	To present	
Kamishibaiya	Literature	Japanese	To present	
Kathakar	Literature	Indian	To present	
Maggid	Religious lore, literature	Jewish		
Manaschi	Literature	Kyrgyz	To present	
Manganiar	Songs and music	Rajasthani (Indian)	To present	
Meddah	Literature	Turkish	Until 20th century	
Mo phi	Religious knowledge	Thai		
Naqqal	Literature	Iranian	To present	
Pawang	Religious knowledge	Malay and Indonesian	To present	
Qawwāl	Religious songs	Asian (Sufi)	To present	
Rāwī	Poetry, literature, and religious texts	Arabic	Until 8th century CE	
Sėsėn	Literature	Bashkir	To present	
Sorikkun	Pansori	Korean		
Tuulchi	Literature	Mongolian	To present	
Wu	Religious lore	Chinese	Until ?	
Zajjalin	Poetry	Andalusian, Lebanese, Palestinian, Syrian, Jordanian, Moroccan, and Algerian	To present	
Zhyrau	Poetry, eg. Kazakh literature	Turkic, eg. Kazakh	To present	

== Europe ==
Term	Type/s of information	Society/ies	Period	Sources
Aoidos	Poetry and songs	Ancient Greek	Until ?	
Aois-dàna	Genealogy	Scottish Highlander	Until 17th century	
Bard	General	Scottish, Irish, and Welsh	Until ?	
Bertsolari	Poetry	Basque	To present	
Cuntisti	Literature	Sicilian (Italian)		
Druid	Religious lore	Celtic	Until ?	
Drut'syla	Literature	Jewish	To present	
Dziady	Songs	Slavic eg. Polish		
Filí	Poetry	Irish and Scottish	Until 15th century	
Fulesta	Literature	Romagnol (Italian)	To present?	
Kobzar	Songs	Ukrainian	Until 20th century (revived)	.
Lahutar	Poetry	Albanian		
Lăutari	Songs	Romanian and Romani	To present	
Lirnyk	Literature and songs	Ukrainian	Until 20th century	
Klezmer	Songs	Jewish		
Makar	General	Scottish		
Minstrel	Songs	European	Until 19th century	
Ollam	General	Irish	Until ?	
Piitárides	Songs	Cypriot		
Rhapsode	Poetry	Ancient Greek	Until ?	
Rimadóri	Songs	Cretan (Greek)		
Seanchai	Literature and history	Irish, Manx, and Scottish Highlander	To present	
Scop	Poetry	English	Until ?	
Skald	Poetry	Scandinavian	Until 16th century	
Skomorokh	Songs	Russian	Until 18th century	
Spelman	Songs	Swedish		
Spielmann	Songs	German		
Thyle	General	Scandinavian and Anglo-Saxon	Until 7th century	
Tietäjä	General, Poetry	Finnish	Until 20th century	

== North America ==
Term	Type/s of information	Society/ies	Period	Sources
Calypsonian	Songs	Trinidadian		
Iyalawo	Religious knowledge	Afro-Cuban	To present	
Medicine man	Religious knowledge	Native American	To present	
North American Indigenous elder	General	North American Indigenous	To present	
Oungan and Manbo	Religious lore	Afro-Haitian	To present	
Paleros	Religious lore	Afro-Cuban		

== South America ==
Term	Type/s of information	Society/ies	Period	Sources
Amauta	General	Incan	Until ?	
Yatiri	Religious knowledge	Aymara	To present	

== Oceania ==
Term	Type/s of information	Society/ies	Period	Sources
Australian Aboriginal elder	General	Australian Aboriginal	To present	
Fāgogo	Literature	Samoan	To present	
Ha'atufunga	Royal rituals	Tongan	To present	
Haku mo'olelo	Literature	Hawaiian		
Kahuna	Religious lore	Polynesian, eg. Hawaiian		
Mea hula	Literature	Hawaiian	To present	
Tulafale	General	Samoan	To present	
Wānanga	General	Māori	To present	

== See also ==
- Troubador - Occitan poet, until the 14th century
- Shadow play
- Rakugoka - Japanese performer of verbal comedy
- Bharatanatyam - Tamil traditional dance and literature
- Katha (storytelling format) - Indian religious storytelling

== Bibliography ==
- Boileau, Gilles (2002). "Wu and Shaman". Bulletin of the School of Oriental and African Studies. 65 (2): 350–378. doi:10.1017/S0041977X02000149. S2CID 27656590.
- Jacobi, Renate (1995). "Rāwī". In Bosworth, C. E.; van Donzel, E.; Heinrichs, W. P. & Lecomte, G. (eds.). The Encyclopaedia of Islam, Second Edition. Volume VIII: Ned–Sam. Leiden: E. J. Brill. pp. 466–467. ISBN 978-90-04-09834-3.
- Piliavsky, Anastasia (2020). Nobody's People: Hierarchy as Hope in a Society of Thieves. South Asia in Motion. California, USA: Stanford University Press. ISBN 978-1503614215. LCCN 2020025601. OCLC 1182020277.
