= Louise Mushikiwabo =

Secretary-General of Organisation internationale de la Francophonie

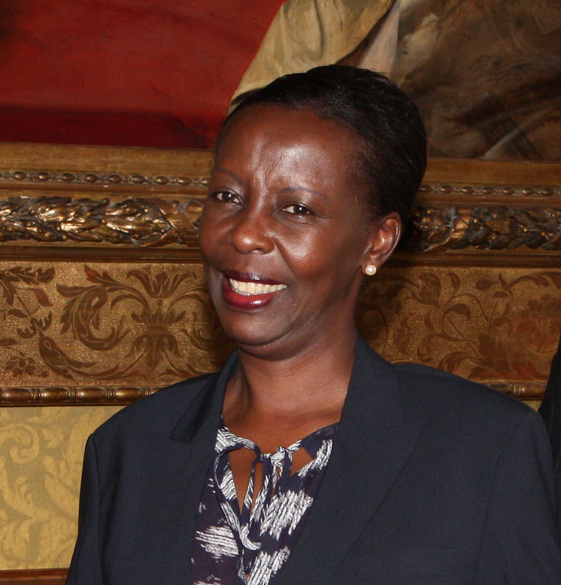
- Mushikiwabo in 2013

4th Secretary-General of the Organisation internationale de la Francophonie
- Incumbent
- Assumed office 3 January 2019
- Preceded by: Michaëlle Jean

Minister of Foreign Affairs
- In office 4 December 2009 – 18 October 2018
- President: Paul Kagame
- Preceded by: Rosemary Museminali
- Succeeded by: Richard Sezibera

Personal details
- Born: 22 May 1961 (age 65) Kigali, Rwanda
- Party: Independent
- Education: University of Rwanda (BA); University of Delaware (MA)

Louise Mushikiwabo (born May 22, 1961) is a Rwandan politician and diplomat who is the fourth and current Secretary-General of the Organisation internationale de la Francophonie (OIF). She previously served as Minister of Foreign Affairs and Cooperation from 2009 to 2018. She also served as Government Spokesperson. She had previously been Minister of Information (2008–2009).

Mushikiwabo was elected Secretary-General of the OIF on 12 October 2018, succeeding Michaëlle Jean, and took office on 3 January 2019. She was re-elected for a second four-year term in November 2022. At the November 2026 Francophonie summit in Cambodia, her bid for a third term was opposed by the Democratic Republic of the Congo amid tensions over Rwanda's involvement in the conflict in eastern Congo. The election was postponed, and her term was extended by one year, until 2027.

== Early life ==
Louise Mushikiwabo was born on 22 May 1961 in Kigali, the Rwandan capital. Her father was Bitsindinkumi, from the Batsobe clan; Bitsindinkumi worked as a farmer, managing the family's smallholding as well as working as bookkeeper for a colonial coffee plantation. Her mother was Nyiratulira, a first cousin of the Abiru philosopher and historian Alexis Kagame. She spent her childhood in Kigali. The youngest of nine children, her siblings included Lando Ndasingwa, who became a notable businessman and politician in Rwanda before being killed in 1994 during the Rwandan genocide, and Anne-Marie Kantengwa, who took over Lando's hotel Chez Lando after his death and served in the Parliament of Rwanda from 2003 to 2008.

After completing primary and secondary school in Kigali, Mushikiwabo went to study at the National University of Rwanda (currently University of Rwanda), in the southern city of Butare, in 1981. She graduated from university in 1984, with a bachelor's degree in English, and then worked briefly as a secondary school teacher. In 1986, she emigrated from Rwanda to the United States, where she began studying for a master's degree in Languages and Interpretation at the University of Delaware, with French as her specialist language. Upon finishing her studies in 1988, she remained in the United States, settling in the Washington, D.C. area. She started her career working for lobbying organisations, before taking a position with the African Development Bank (ADB); as part of her role with the ADB she lived in Tunisia for a short time, and eventually became the bank's Communications Director.

In 2006, Mushikiwabo wrote a book, Rwanda Means the Universe, which was co-authored by Jack Kramer, an American journalist and ex-marine. The book is semi-autobiographical, describing Mushikiwabo's family history, her early life in Rwanda, and her experiences upon emigrating to the United States. It also describes the Rwandan genocide in detail, from a historical perspective as well as from Mushikwabo's own point of view living in Washington, as she received the news that many of her family members had been killed.

== Political career ==
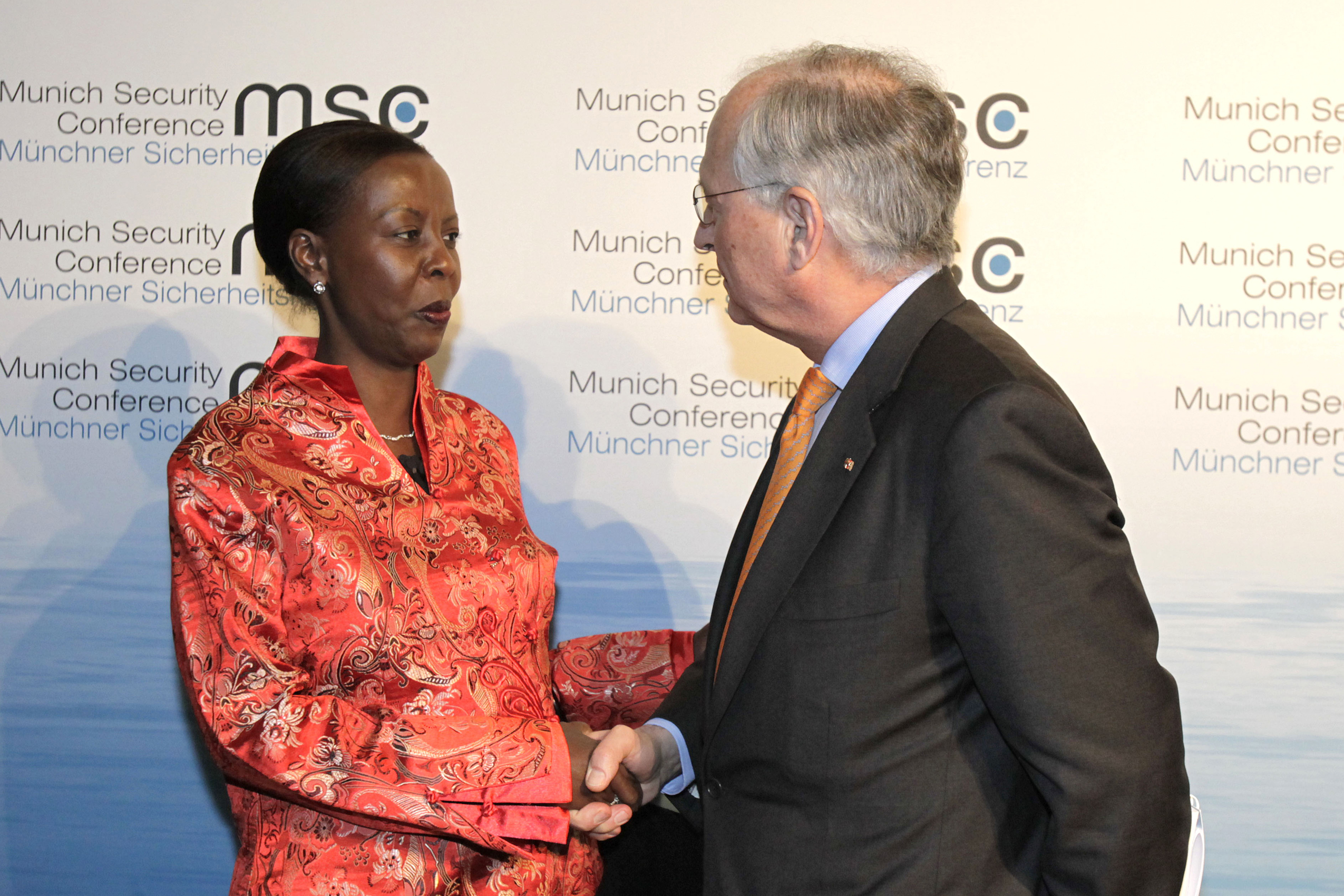
Mushikiwabo with German diplomat Wolfgang Ischinger at the 50th Munich Security Conference, 2014

=== Minister of Information, 2008–2009 ===
In March 2008, Mushikiwabo was invited by Rwandan President Paul Kagame to return to her homeland Rwanda and take up a position in his government. She was appointed to the post of Minister of Information, replacing Laurent Nkusi. Early in her tenure, Mushikiwabo was responsible for deciding whether to take action against several local media organisations that had run defamatory stories about Kagame. One newspaper, the Kinyarwanda-language daily Umuco, had published an article comparing the president to Adolf Hitler, and the High Council of the Press (HCP) had requested the government to suspend the newspaper's licence. Nkusi had refused this request, and while Mushikiwabo did not officially suspend the paper, it nonetheless stopped printing in October 2008. Mushikiwabo generally encouraged her colleagues to support freedom of the press, but was also firm in ensuring that the media complied with Rwanda's tough laws surrounding genocide denial. In 2009, she issued a temporary ban on the Kinyarwanda radio station broadcast by the British Broadcasting Corporation (BBC), because she claimed it had aired programmes "giving free scope to genocidaires and negationists of the genocide"; the BBC denied this claim, arguing that it and the government had different interpretations of the genocide.

As well as being responsible for the ministry's decision making, Mushikiwabo also fulfilled the role of government spokesperson during her stint as Minister of Information. For example when Rwanda had a diplomatic crisis with Germany following the arrest of President Kagame's chief of protocol Rose Kabuye, Mushikiwabo spoke to the international media to clarify the Rwandan government's position. She made use of her linguistic skills, being able to give statements in all of Rwanda's official languages, Kinyarwanda, French and English.

=== Secretary-General of La Francophonie (2019–present) ===
On 12 October 2018, Mushikiwabo was elected Secretary-General of the Organisation internationale de la Francophonie (OIF) at its summit in Yerevan, Armenia, defeating incumbent Michaëlle Jean. Her candidacy was supported by French President Emmanuel Macron and the African Union, but drew criticism over the human rights record of the Rwandan government under President Paul Kagame. Four former French ministers responsible for Francophonie affairs publicly opposed her appointment, arguing that Rwanda's record was incompatible with the organization's stated commitment to democracy and human rights. She took office on 3 January 2019, becoming the organization's fourth Secretary-General and the first from Rwanda.

During her first term, Mushikiwabo sought to strengthen the OIF's role in promoting the French language, particularly in Africa, and to improve cooperation among member states. She also advocated greater use of French in international organizations and addressed the challenges facing the language in an increasingly English-dominated international environment. In November 2022, she was re-elected unopposed for a second four-year term at the Francophonie summit in Djerba, Tunisia.

Her second term coincided with growing tensions between several African member states and the organization. In March 2025, Mali, Niger and Burkina Faso announced their withdrawal from the OIF following disputes over sanctions imposed after military coups. The three countries accused the organization of applying its principles selectively.

At the 20th Francophonie Summit in Phnom Penh, Cambodia, in November 2026, Mushikiwabo sought a third four-year term. Her candidacy was opposed by the Democratic Republic of the Congo (DRC), which accused Rwanda of supporting the M23 rebel group in eastern Congo. The Congolese government threatened to withdraw from the OIF if she was re-elected. The DRC initially nominated Juliana Lumumba, daughter of former Congolese prime minister Patrice Lumumba, before indicating its support for former Romanian prime minister Dacian Cioloș. Former Mauritanian minister Coumba Ba was also a candidate.

French President Macron attempted to negotiate a compromise, but the member states failed to agree on a candidate. On 16 November, the summit postponed the election for one year and extended Mushikiwabo's tenure until 2027. Under the agreement, Rwanda would not nominate a candidate in the subsequent election. The compromise prevented the threatened Congolese withdrawal, although the decision to extend Mushikiwabo's term rather than elect a successor drew criticism from some participants, including Cioloș.

== Other activities ==
- Africa Europe Foundation (AEF), Member of the High-Level Group of Personalities on Africa-Europe Relations (since 2020)
- Munich Security Conference, Member of the Advisory Council
- International Gender Champions (IGC), Member
- Paris School of International Affairs (PSIA), Member of the Strategic Committee

== Personal life and family ==
Her brother, Lando Ndasingwa, was the only Tutsi minister in the last Habyarimana government, but was killed at the beginning of the 1994 genocide. Her sister, Anne-Marie Kantengwa, took over the management of their brother's hotel and restaurant, Chez Lando, after his murder. Mushikiwabo is also the niece of the distinguished Rwandan scholar and priest Alexis Kagame.

== See also ==
- List of foreign ministers in 2017
- Cabinet of Rwanda
