= Alexis Kagame =

Rwandan philosopher

Alexis Kagame (15 May 1912 – 2 December 1981) was a Rwandan philosopher, linguist, historian, poet and Catholic priest. His main contributions were in the fields of ethnohistory and "ethnophilosophy" (the study of indigenous philosophical systems).

As a professor of theology, he carried out wide research into the oral history, traditions and literature of Rwanda, and wrote several books on the subject, both in French and Kinyarwanda. He also wrote poetry, which was also published.

Kagame was also active in the political field, and was seen by some European scholars as the intellectual leader of Tutsi culture and rights under the colonial system starting in the 1940s.

== Life ==
Kagame was born in Kiyanza - Buliza Rwanda, in actual Murambi Sector, Rulindo District, Northern Province, to a long line of court historians. His family had high status in the kingdom of Rwanda, being of the ruling Tutsi class, and also belonging to a group called Abiru, the traditional ministers in the court of the Mwami. At the time of his birth, Rwanda was a German colony, but the Mwami still had considerable power as the colonial authorities ruled indirectly through him. When the area passed to Belgium, some in his family converted to Catholicism. After attending a missionary primary school, Kagame studied in the Minor Seminary of Kabgayi from October 1928 to 1933. He continued his studies at Nyakibanda Regional Seminary and was ordained a priest in 1941. During this time, he was also the editor of an important Catholic newspaper, Kinyamateka, in the 1940s and 1950s (The National University of Rwanda has a nearly complete run of Kinyamateka). In 1950, he became the first African to gain membership in the Institut Royal Colonial Belge.

A turning point came in 1952, when he wrote Le Code des Institutions Politiques de Rwanda (in support of his friend King Mutara III Rudahigwa), which was a defense of the Rwandan system of rule by clientage. The colonial regime, which was trying to break up Rwandans' linkages through clientage, found this threatening to their efforts to control the kingdom and pressured his bishop into reposting him to Rome. While there, he studied at the Gregorian University and took his doctoral degree in philosophy. He also became a member of "Les Prêtres Noirs", a group of African Theology students who wanted to employ Christianity as a basis for African nationalist aspirations.

After returning to Rwanda in 1958 he became a teacher at the Catholic seminary and a prominent member of the independence movement which, despite his identification with the Tutsi monarchy, may have saved him during the Belgian-led Hutu uprising in 1959. He later became one of the first professors at the new National University of Rwanda (1963) and visiting professor at the University of Lubumbashi.

Kagame collected a large number of very important oral documents from high Rwandan functionaries of the pre-colonial Rwandan administration, but he published only summaries and interpretations of them, not the full accounts, because he'd promised his informants to wait to do that until they died. The European Catholic clergy and the Belgian colonial administration heartily disliked his research, writing, and politics because they seemed at odds with their post-war project to end the Rwandan royal system in favor of a modern republican system that they could, they hoped, influence more readily. As a result, the church and state at various times censored his publications either by stopping publication or cutting sections out of publications. Ten numbered paragraphs are missing from Alexis Kagame, Un Abrégé, 2:335-336. Furthermore, his 1945 transcript of the Rwandan kings' esoteric code was felt so dangerous to Belgian interests that the colonial military confiscated it, and it was only published in 1964 by Belgian scholars who at the time denied it was Kagame's, though they later admitted it was. Kagame was put under house arrest at times by the colonial military administration to limit his political influence.

Following Rwandan independence, he became a strong advocate for the Africanization of Christianity, maintaining that missionary attitudes were still prevalent.

Alexis Kagame is a first cousin once removed of Landoald Ndasingwa and his sister Louise Mushikiwabo who describes him as a very tall, massive jolly man with a big sense of humor, despite his critical inclinations. Mgr. Kagame died unexpectedly in 1981, while on a visit to Nairobi.

== Work ==
=== Political ===
According to Claudine Vidal, Kagame's overarching goal was the creation of a constitutional monarchy. Kagame studies portrayed a pre-colonial Rwandese society in which ubuhake cattle clientship created a harmonious society that allows easy social mobility. He eventually partnered with Belgian anthropologist Jacques Maquet, who reworked Kagame's thesis into highly influential academic works. Subsequent academic research largely disproved the Kagame-Maquet depiction of an idyllic pre-colonial society by taking into account the degrading uburetwa land contract. Uburetwa was largely ignored by Maquet, whose research relied upon Kagame's manuscripts. Kagame's depiction of a stable, socially progressive nation, as well as his maps showing expansive territorial influence, were used by the Rwandan Patriotic Front in the late 1990s to justify their rule and invasion of the eastern Democratic Republic of the Congo.

=== Linguistic ===
His international linguistic reputation rests mainly on two works:

- La Philosophie Bantu-Rwandaise de l'Être (1956): an analysis of the Kinyarwanda language and culture as it relates to their concept of "Being". and,
- La Philosophie Bantu Comparée (1976): A broader study including all the Bantu languages.

In these works, Kagame attempts to demonstrate that the structure of the Bantu languages reveals a complex ontology that is uniquely African in nature. Critics charge that he is imposing Aristotelian concepts on something that is non-logical. In other words, that language structure was not consciously designed but, rather, developed randomly over a long period and therefore is the cause, not the effect, of the way people think. Nonetheless, Kinyarwanda is generally accepted to be one of the most orderly, complex, and difficult languages in the world.

- Un Abrégé de l’Ethno-histoire du Rwanda. Butare, Éditions Universitaires du Rwanda, 1972-75. 2 volumes
- Introduction aux Grands Genres Lyriques de l’Ancien Rwanda. Butare, Éditions Universitaires du Rwanda, 1969
- Les Milices du Rwanda Précolonial. Brussels, 1963

He also wrote several books of poetry and translated the Bible into the Kinyarwanda language.

== See also ==
- Abiru
- African philosophy
- Janheinz Jahn
- Placide Tempels
- Linguistic relativity
