= Boniface Benzinge =

Rwandan chief

Boniface Benzinge is the Rwandan chief of the Abiru, privy counsellors to the Mwami of Rwanda. He is also the ex officio leader of the Abatsobe, the Tutsi caste that provides the Abirus on a hereditary basis.

== Life ==
A member of a family of royal historians, Benzinge was a childhood friend and courtier to King Kigeli V, who was the last reigning king of his country before being deposed in 1961. Benzinge devoted his own life to the service of the Rwandan Crown, usually standing behind the King and speaking on his behalf until his death.

Following that event, Benzinge and his fellow Abiru announced his nephew as Kigeli's titular successor. Although a faction of the royal family opposed this act, the new king was nevertheless subsequently crowned as Yuhi VI in 2017.

Since this occurred, Benzinge has continued to serve as the head of the royal court. In doing this, he has kept the sacred oral traditions of the Abiru secret society alive.

== See also ==
- Abiru

== Additional links ==
- "Rwanda Update: Declaration of a "False King" Backfires as Country Prepares for a Royal Funeral and a New King". January 13, 2017.
