= Ibitekerezo =

Ibitekerezo is a form of epic hero poetry that was performed at the royal court in precolonial Rwanda. This oral tradition serves to explain the history of Rwandan dynasties in poetic form. It is one of four major royal traditions of the Kingdom of Rwanda alongside ubwiru (royal rituals) and the oral literature forms ubucurabwenge (royal genealogies typically recited at coronation ceremonies) and ibisigo (royal poems). Ethnographers Jean Hiernaux and Emma Maquet captured audio of several major ibitekerezo.

== Features ==
Ibitekerezo were officially composed court histories recounted through song, and accompanied by a musical instrument. These poems were of two types based on their composition, either in verse or in prose. The name Ibitekerezo is derived from the Kinyarwanda verb gutekereza, which means "to recount, reflect, or consider".

Before Rwanda was colonized by the Germans in the late 19th century and later the Belgians after World War I, the history of the national heroes of Rwanda was known to the people through Ibitekerezo. The stories of these hero figures included key events in the reigns of historic and mythical kings of the Tutsi dynasty (ibisigo), as well as the monarchs' military victories and the warrior figures who won major battles for the king. The poems served as records of royal history and were preserved by the court's bards. Young men at court undergoing training to become part of the king's military guard (intore) were required to learn these poems as part of their induction into this privileged class. They were also required to compose pieces of poetry with similar aesthetic qualities and emphasis on narrative.

== Performances ==
The songs of ibitekerezo were performed from memory and constructed in verses. In addition to recounting the histories of kings and battles, ibitekerezo include songs in praise of the current king as well as cows, which were glorified in traditional Rwandan society. The Abiru (court musicians and ritualists) were primarily responsible for producing and performing these songs to entertain and honor the king and to protect the general populace from evil spirits. They were also performed to entertain at ceremonies for marriage, harvest and courtship. Some of the musical elements of the ibitekerezo tradition have been blended into modern Rwandan church music.
