= Chez Lando =

Hotel in Kigali, Rwanda

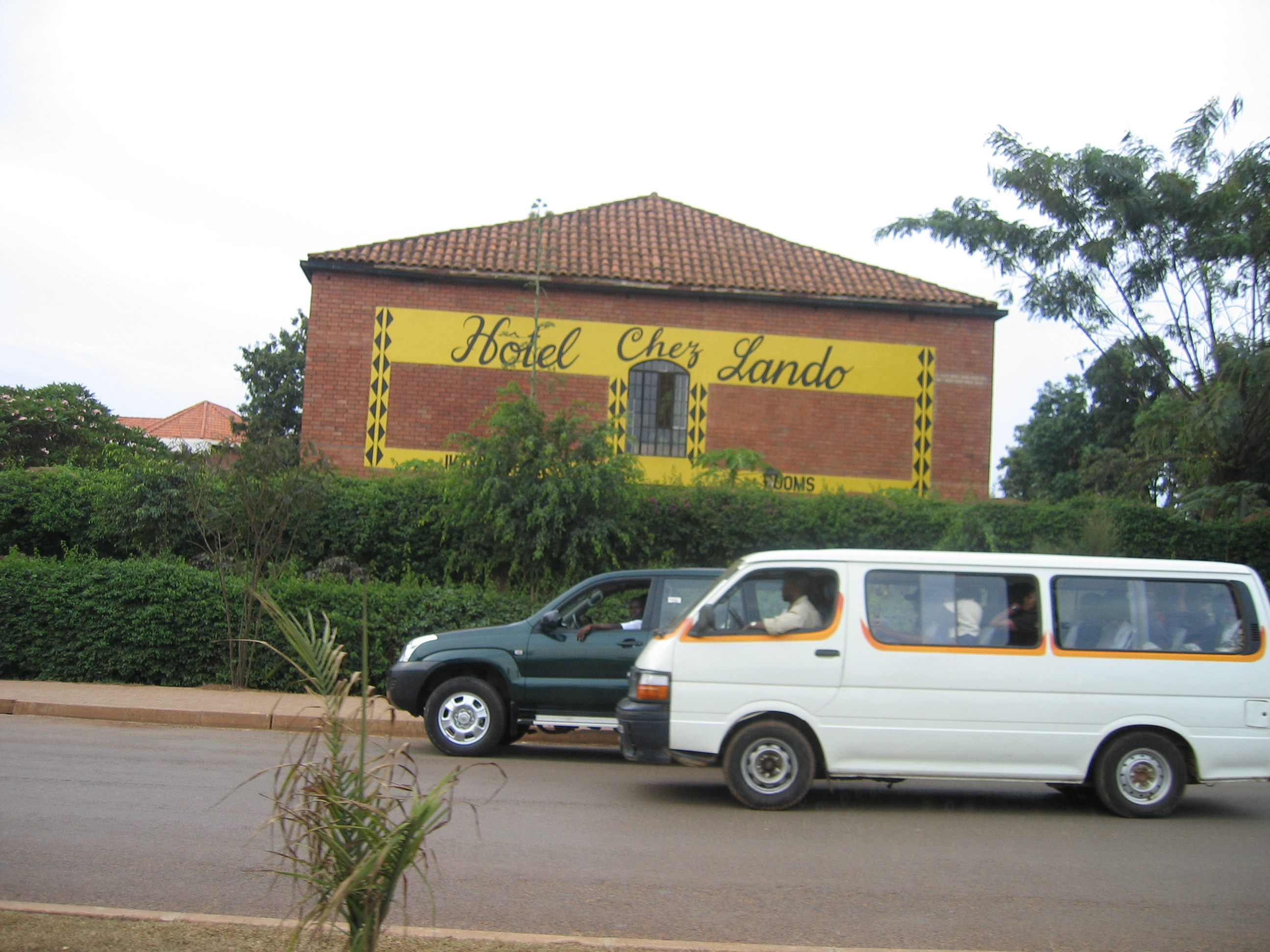
Hotel Chez Lando

Chez Lando is a hotel and restaurant located in the Rwandan capital city, Kigali. The hotel was founded in the 1980s by prominent Rwandan businessman and politician Lando Ndasingwa, and his Canadian wife Hélène, who were both killed in the 1994 Rwandan genocide. Following Ndasingwa's death, the hotel was taken over by his sister Anne-Marie Kantengwa, who was a 2013 student on the IEEW's Peace Through Business program.
