= Noopja =

Nduwimana Jean Paul (born August 7, 1983) commonly known for his stage name Noopja or Country Boy, is a Rwandan musician, youth educator, author, and businessman. Noopja is the founder of East African leading recording studio 'Country Records', the founder of Rwandan radio station 105.7 FM Country FM, and director of 'Necessary Generation', a local non-governmental organization that helps vulnerable youth from different corners of Rwanda.
