= Sėsėn =

Baskir oral poet

The sėsėn (Bashkir:cәсән; Russian: cэсэн) is a figure in Bashkir society who acts as an oral repository, equivalent to a narrator or poet, or to a bard.

Sėsėns would learn and transmit their knowledge via oral tradition. Performances, sometimes improvised, were often accompanied with a dombra or quray, traditional instruments of the Bashkir. The main pieces performed were epic poems, legends, and kubair, a genre of Bashkir oral literature. They played an active role in public life, and were keenly interested in people's lives. The heyday of the sėsėn was from the 16th to 18th centuries when much of kubair were composed. The banning of iyiyns, traditional meetings of Bashkirs, in the 19th century deprived sėsėns of their audience, however aytysh, traditional competitions between two performers, were widespread. In the 20th century, sėsėns have largely died out and transitioned to literary works.

Before the advent of writing, the sėsėns were considered guardians of wisdom. Several literary figures have personified that character in the 19th century, such as Salavat Julaev, Chabrau, Akmurza, Erėnsė, Kubaruš and Baik Ajdar. Ivan Lepyokhin, a Russian naturalist and explorer, described his encounter with a sėsėn:

"An old man at the age of 60 was considered the best singer among them… He sang about the glorious deeds of his ancestors, which they call batyrs, among them Aldar, Kara Sakal, Kilmyat, Kuchim... The singer sang not only about memorable events of their lives; but with his voice and body movements he expressed all their actions, how they admonished their comrades, how they entered into battle, how they defeated opponents, how, being wounded, they weakened and finally gave up the ghost. All this was so vividly expressed by the old man that many of the interlocutors cried. But suddenly the sadness changed to joy as the old man, having assumed a cheerful look, began to sing a song called “Kara-yurga" (“Black ambler"). This song is considered the most cheerful among them. The old man, singing this song, tapped his feet three times: and then the Bashkir ball opened"

== See also ==
- The World Qoroltai of the Bashkirs
