= Auddy Kelly =

Rwandan singer-songwriter

Auddy Kelly, is a Rwandan singer, songwriter and entrepreneur.

== Early life and education ==
Auddy was born in Rwanda as the second child out of three. He started singing at a young age starting with the Azaph Music International, a choir group at Zion Temple.

He formed a group of singers which were called Anointed 6 and afterwards, started a solo career.

In 2014, Kelly had his Bachelor's degree from the University of Rwanda. In 2018, He proceeded to Mount Kenya University where he bagged his Master's degree in financial management.

== Career ==
Kelly started his career as a singer in 2012. In 2016, He won the Best Afro fusion artist Award and Best Fashion Artist. He was reportedly the first person to organize Karaoke Talent search, which aimed at helping and supporting singers deemed talented through Karaoke. According to KT Press, he also modernized Amasunzu to reality.

== Discography ==
=== Songs ===
He also released album featured Jody Phibi. Studio albums

List of Kelly's studio albums

- Ndakwitegereza (2015)
- Nkoraho Mana (2015)
- " Aho ntabona" (2023)
