= Lando Ndasingwa =

Rwandan politician

Landoald "Lando" Ndasingwa
- Died: 7 April 1994; Kigali, Rwanda
- Occupations: Politician, businessman, hotelier
- Spouse: Hélène Pinski
- Children: Malaika, Patrick
- Parent: Bibiane Nyiratulira

Landoald 'Lando' Ndasingwa (died 7 April 1994) was a Rwandan politician and businessman. He was killed on the first day of the Rwandan genocide.

== Life ==
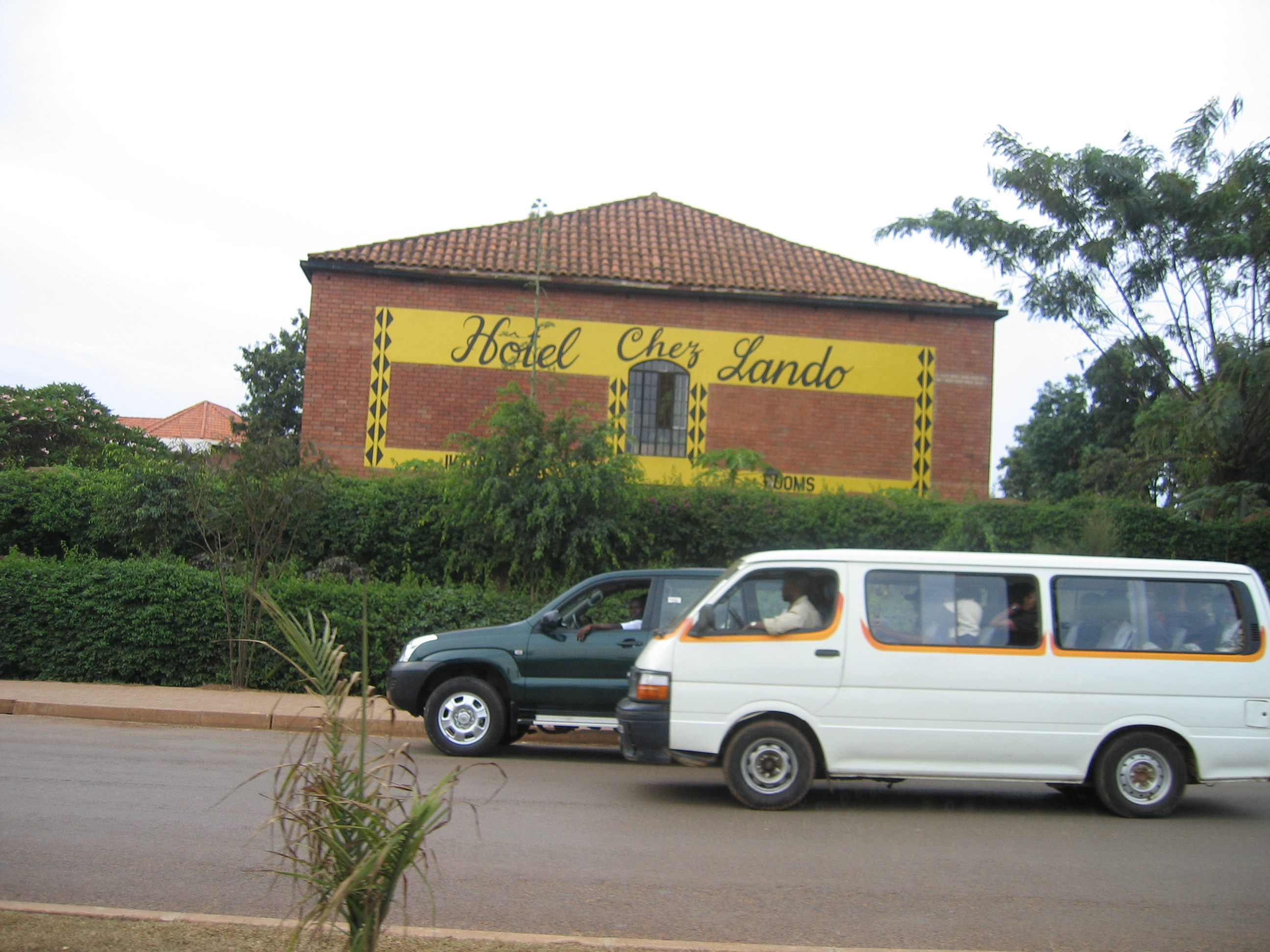
Hotel Chez Lando

Ndasingwa founded the hotel Chez Lando in the 1980s with his Canadian wife Hélène. Following Ndasingwa's death, the hotel was taken over by his sister Anne-Marie Kantengwa.

Educated at the Collège Saint-André of Kigali, the Université Nationale du Rwanda at Butare, Université Laval at Quebec City, McGill University, and Université de Montréal, Ndasingwa was a former professor at the Université Nationale du Rwanda and ethnic Tutsi. As a politician, he was the leader and vice president of the moderate Liberal Party and was granted the portfolio of Minister of Labour and Social Affairs in the Habyarimana transitional government put in place after the Arusha Accords. He was the only Tutsi member of the transitional government.

On February 17, 1994, UNAMIR commander Roméo Dallaire received information of a plot to assassinate Ndasingwa and Joseph Kavaruganda, both prominent political moderates. In his book Shake Hands with the Devil, Dallaire claims that he informed them of this plot, and neither were surprised. As an outspoken and well-known public figure, Ndasingwa was the frequent target of attacks on propaganda radio station RTLM.

== Death ==
On April 7, 1994, Ndasingwa and his Canadian wife, Hélène Pinski, both graduates of the Université de Montréal, were abducted from their house along with their two children, Malaika (age 17) and Patrick (age 15), and Ndasingwa's mother by the government's Presidential Guard, despite being under UNAMIR protection. All were subsequently killed the same day as the assassination of Juvénal Habyarimana and Cyprien Ntaryamira. During his final moments, he and his family requested UNAMIR troops for protection as the presidential guard assaulted their home, his final words being "It's too late."

One of his sisters, Louise Mushikiwabo, became much later (December 2009) Minister of Foreign Affairs and Cooperation in Paul Kagame's government, and, then (October, 2018), Secretary General of the Organisation internationale de la Francophonie.
