= North American Indigenous elder =

Repositories of cultural and philosophical knowledge

Elders, in Indigenous North American cultures, are repositories of cultural and philosophical knowledge within their communities, as well as the transmitters of this storehouse of information. They are regarded as living libraries, with information on a wide variety of practical, spiritual and ceremonial topics, including "basic beliefs and teachings, encouraging...faith in the Great Spirit, the Creator". "The fact acknowledged in most Indian societies: Certain individuals, by virtue of qualifications and knowledge, are recognized by the Indian communities as the ultimately qualified reservoirs of aboriginal skills." The role of elder is featured within and without classrooms, conferences, ceremonies, and homes.

The following definition is from a study of the role in one community by Roderick Mark at the University of Calgary:

A point of reference: those people who have earned the respect of their own community and who are looked upon as elders in their own society...We have misused the role of elder through our ignorance and failure to see that not all elders are spiritual leaders and not all old people are elders

— Roderick Mark (1985)

The following definition from a curriculum guide in Edmonton outlines one context of learning:

The elder: Not all older or elderly people are considered elders. An elder is a person that has accumulated a great deal of wisdom and knowledge throughout his or her lifetime, especially in the tradition and customs of the group.
Elders emphasize listening and not asking WHY. There isn't any word in the Cree language for "why." A learner must sit quietly and patiently while the elder passe[s] on his wisdom. Listening is considered to be very important. Questions were not encouraged. Asking questions was considered rude. Clarification of a certain point or comments was considered okay.
Learners were also encouraged to watch and listen to what was happening around them. Eventually with enough patience and enough time the answer would come to the learner. When this happened, the learning was truly his own. (Tipahaskan 1986:104-5)

— Sacred Circle Project, Edmonton, grade 3 "Lifestyles in Culturally Distinctive Communities" curriculum guide

The importance of context is indicated by the "specialization" of elders knowledge: "The elders' skills are activated in contextual situations to meet specific needs." As well as by the need for preparation in classroom settings: "'People responsible for the hiring of older Indians as resource people make the mistake of merely putting them in a classroom with young children. The elders want to tell stories as they used to but children are either too impatient to listen, or perhaps do not understand.'"

The importance of context and preparation is also indicated by the following quote: "For example, recent work with the Menominee indicated that eye contact between an elder teacher and a child was necessary for informal teaching to proceed, and any disruption on the part of the child was challenged (Medicine, unpublished field notes 1987). Similarly, I have heard Lakota (Sioux) parents state, 'Look me in the eyes!' when addressing children and grandchildren."

Politically elders may be accorded a weak position. At conferences elders may be treated as tokens and simply be brought out at the beginning and end to lead ceremonies. In classrooms elders may be unpaid or underpaid.

== See also ==
- Elder
- Haudenosaunee Clan Mother
- Oral history
