= Amusnaw =

Kabyle oral repository

Amusnaw (pl. Imusnawen) is a Kabyle term in traditional Kabyle society that designates the repository of oral knowledge of a village or a tribe. The word comes from the root of the verb ssen (to know). The imusnawen constitute a chain that transmit traditional knowledge between generations: not only oral literature, like asefru or sayings and aphorisms, but also history, the genealogy of the most prestigious families, customary law etc. Becoming an amusnaw occurred by election and a two state apprenticeship: first by embodiment of the role and building skills in their environment through verbal commerce and contest, and next by training and assessment from a master poet.

Mouloud Mammeri, a famous figure of Berber culture, was the son of the last amusnaw of At Yenni, and has left a detailed description in his volume of ancient Kabyle poems. Mammeri's translation of amusnaw is 'wisdom' rather than 'knowledge'. According to his analysis, the members of traditional Kabyle society fit three categories:

- argaz lâali - 'a respectable man': he who conforms to leqwam (righteous behaviour), the minimum that is required of each member of society
- argaz - 'a true man': he who knows and practices Kabyle values, based on the sense on honour (nnif), rigid discipline, and good relations between men, enforcing that everyone be given what is due and everyone asks for what is due
- amusnaw - 'the wisdom': he who searches for tamussni, a wisdom that transcends local culture and can extend to include even the most distant and, at first sight, hostile and foreign cultures. Mammeri said: "The tamussni does not know boundaries."

The rule of the amusnaw is only one of simple repetition. Beyond having brilliant memories, an amusnaw must have a ready spirit and the capacity to compose his own works of oral literature, often improvised. Not infrequently, the visit of a stranger amusnaw, while well regarded as an opportunity to share knowledge and different experiences, was also a moment of challenge for the community, which was represented by its own amusnaw in an inevitable poetic contest in which the two men did not spare each other blows, as communicated in the well-known Kabyle riddle "two lions fighting with milk and honey". History recalls of several cases, where after having completed the training of a successor, the amusnaw finally felt peace knowing that if he were missing, the village would have someone who could rise to this challenge.

An important task of the amusnaw was to act as a point of reference in moments of confusion, when sudden changes, such as European colonialism, proposed unusual challenges that the common man didn't know how to face. For this reason, according to Mammeri, Si Mohand, while not technically an amusnaw, can be considered one.
