= Amasunzu =

Traditional Tutsi hairstyle

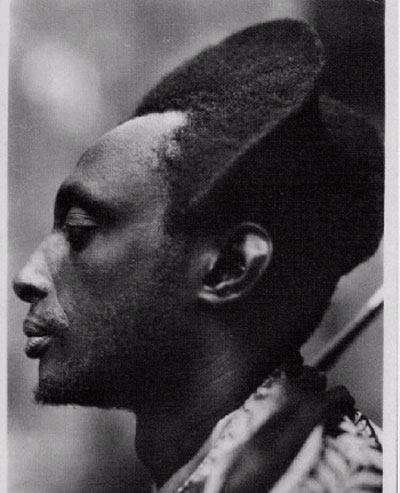
Tutsi man with Amasunzu hairstyle

Amasunzu is an elaborate hairstyle traditionally worn by Rwandan men and unmarried women, with the hair styled into crests, frequently described as crescent-shaped. The hairstyle indicated social status, and men who did not wear Amasunzu were looked on with suspicion until the 20th century. The style was also worn by unmarried women after the age of 18–20 years, indicating that they are of marriageable age.

== Use in Pop Culture ==
Tyler, the Creator's Chromakopia album cover features a traditional Amasunzu.
