= Banyarwanda =

Ethnolinguistic group native to Rwanda

Abanyarwanda

Total population
- 16,044,000

Regions with significant populations
- Rwanda, Burundi, Uganda, Tanzania and the DR Congo

Languages
- Kinyarwanda

Religion
- Christianity, Islam and Rwandan religion

Related ethnic groups
- Other Bantu peoples

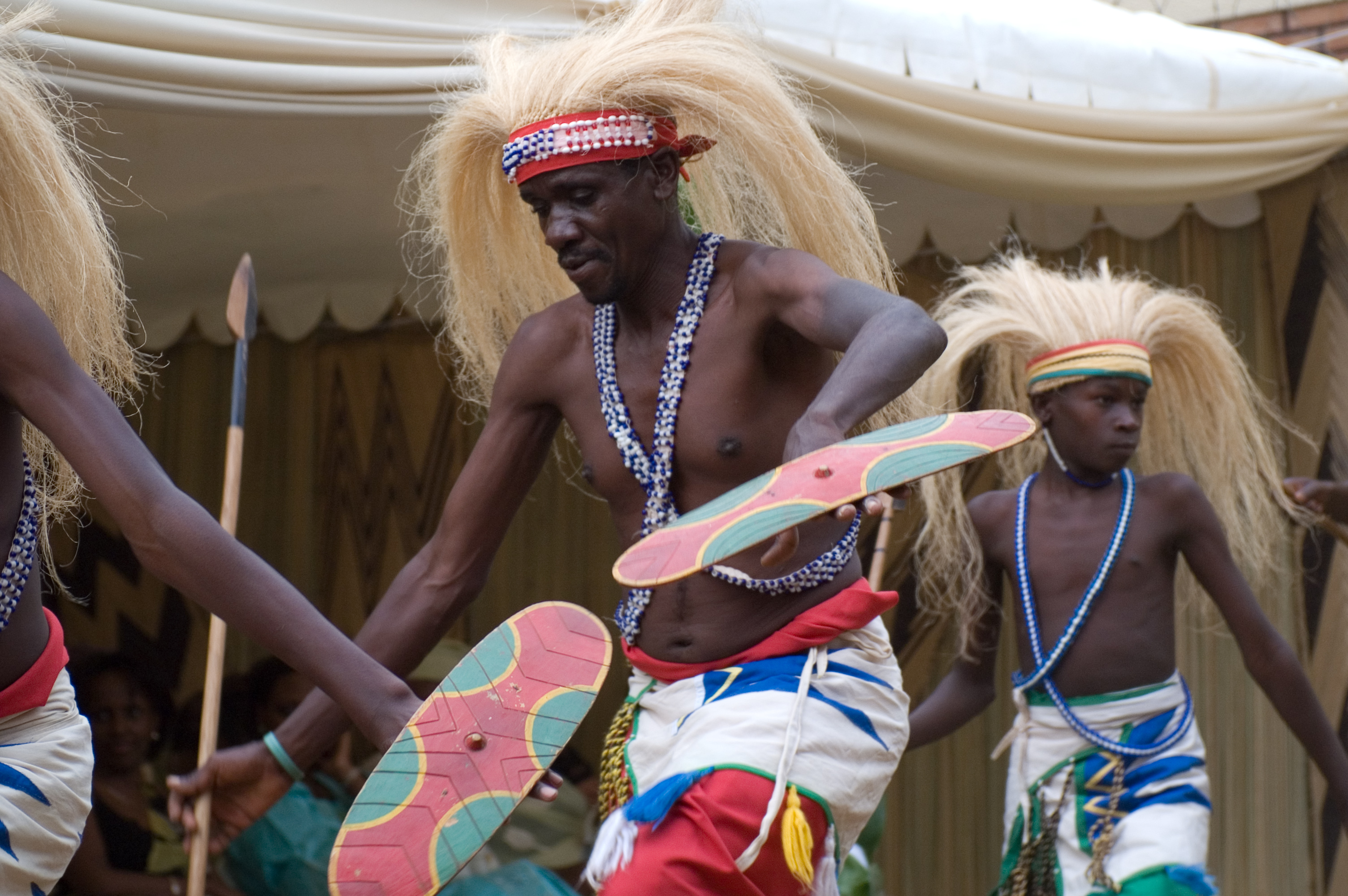

The Banyarwanda (Kinyarwanda: Abanyarwanda, plural; Umunyarwanda, singular) are a Bantu ethnolinguistic supraethnicity native to the northern African Great Lakes region, primarily the modern countries of Rwanda and Burundi. The Banyarwanda are also ethnic minorities in neighboring DR Congo, Uganda and Tanzania.

Although the ethnic make-up of Burundi is similar to that of Rwanda, Banyarwanda is a political neologism used solely in Rwanda since the 1990s in order to mitigate ethnic division within the country following the Rwandan Civil War and the 1994 Rwandan genocide.

In the 1930s the Belgian colonial authorities, who controlled both Congo, Rwanda and Burundi at the time, implemented programs to encourage large numbers of Banyarwanda to emigrate to the Belgian Congo from Rwanda and Burundi. The population of Banyarwanda has increased later by large numbers fleeing violence in those two countries especially in the 1960s and the 1990s.

An estimated 524,098 Banyarwanda live in Uganda, where they live in the west of the country; Umutara and Kitara are the centres of their pastoral and agricultural areas.

== Classification ==
The Banyarwanda, through their language of Kinyarwanda, form a subgroup of the Bantu peoples, who inhabit a geographical area stretching east and southward from Central Africa across the African Great Lakes region down to Southern Africa.

Scholars from the Royal Museum of Central Africa in Tervuren, building on earlier work by Malcolm Guthrie, placed Kinyarwanda within the Great Lakes Bantu languages. This classification groups the Banyarwanda with nineteen other ethnic groups including the Barundi, Banyankore, Baganda and Bahunde.

== History ==
=== Origins ===
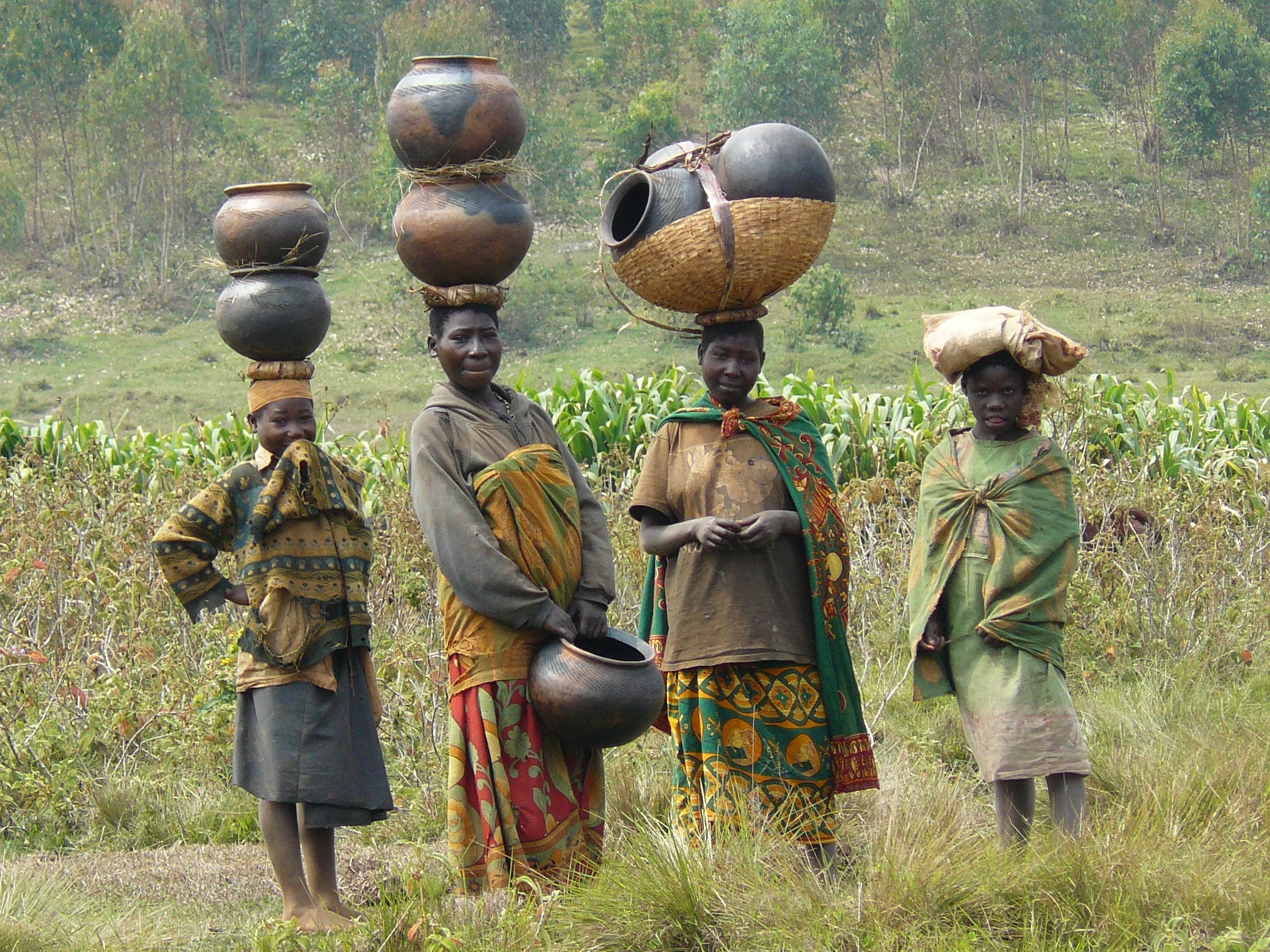
The Twa were the earliest of the Banyarwanda groups to settle in the territory of Rwanda

The Banyarwanda are descended from a diverse group of people, who settled in the area through a series of migrations. The earliest known inhabitants of the African Great Lakes area were a sparse group of hunter gatherers, who lived in the late Stone Age. They were followed by a larger population of early Iron Age settlers, who produced dimpled pottery and iron tools. According to some theories these early inhabitants were the ancestors of the Twa, a group of aboriginal pygmy hunter-gatherers who remain in the area today. Between 700 BC and 1500 AD, a number of Bantu groups migrated into the territory, and began to clear forest land for agriculture.

Some state that the forest-dwelling Twa lost much of their habitat and moved to the slopes of mountains. Others argue the Twa came to exist as a group who were in a close client relationship with the farmer populations, and that perceived physical distinctions are not from separate Origins, but caused by the advantages of small stature in forest hunting leading to more opportunities to have children and to those of higher stature leaving the group. The removal of taller women from the marginalized class group may have also played a role.

Historians have several theories regarding the nature of the Bantu migrations; one theory is that the first settlers were Hutu, while the Tutsi migrated later and formed a distinct racial group, possibly of Cushitic origin. An alternative theory is that the migration was slow and steady, with incoming groups integrating into rather than conquering the existing society. Under this theory, the Hutu and Tutsi distinction arose later and was a class distinction rather than a racial one.

The earliest form of social organisation in the area was the clan (ubwoko). The clans were not limited to genealogical lineages or geographical area, and most included Hutu, Tutsi, and Twa. From the 14th or 15th centuries, the clans began to coalesce into kingdoms, of which the Kingdom of Rwanda was one. The first Banyarwanda were the people of this kingdom. According to oral history, Rwanda was founded on the shores of Lake Muhazi in the Buganza area, close to the modern city of Rwamagana. At that time, it was a small state in a loose confederation with the larger and more powerful neighbouring kingdoms, Bugesera and Gisaka. The kingdom was invaded by the Banyoro around 1600, and the kings forced to flee westward, but the kingdom survived and a new dynasty, the Nyiginya, was built by Ruganzu Ndori, which started expanding from its base in Nyanza. As the kingdom expanded, the people in conquered areas became part of the Banyarwanda identity. The kingdom reached its greatest extent during the nineteenth century under the reign of King Kigeli Rwabugiri. Rwabugiri initiated several administrative reforms in Banyarwanda culture; these included ubuhake, in which Tutsi patrons ceded cattle, and therefore privileged status, to Hutu or Tutsi clients in exchange for economic and personal service, and uburetwa, a corvée system in which Hutu were forced to work for Tutsi chiefs. Rwabugiri's changes caused a rift to grow between the Hutu and Tutsi populations. The Twa were better off than in pre-Kingdom days, with some becoming dancers in the royal court, but their numbers continued to decline.

=== Migrations and colonial influence ===
The first exodus of ethnic Banyarwanda from the jurisdiction of the Rwanda kingdom was the Banyamulenge, who crossed the Rusizi river into the South Kivu province of the Belgian Congo. Rwandan historian Alexis Kagame wrote in 1972 that soldiers under King Kigeli II settled in the Congo in the 1700s, although Gérard Prunier casts some doubt on this hypothesis, stating that Kagame had "a tendency to exaggerate the power of the old Rwanda kingdom." International historians believe the first significant influx of Banyarwanda into South Kivu occurred in the 1880s, although some Congolese intellectuals contest this. Scholars cite two major reasons for the migration; the first is that the migrants were composed of Tutsi trying to avoid the increasingly high taxes imposed by Rwabugiri, while the second is that the group was fleeing the violent war of succession that erupted after the death of Rwabugiri in 1895. This group was mostly Tutsi and their Hutu abagaragu (clients) had been icyihuture (turned Tutsi), which negated interethnic tension. They settled above the Ruzizi Plain on the Itombwe Plateau. The plateau, which reached an altitude of 3,000 metres (9,800 ft), could not support large-scale agriculture, but allowed cattle grazing. Over time, the Banyamulenge identified less as Banyarwanda and more as Congolese. Having settled in the country before the colonial era, they were later treated as a native ethnic minority within the Congo, rather than as migrants or refugees.

At the end of the nineteenth century, the territory of Rwanda was assigned to Germany, marking the beginning of the colonial era. The first major contact between the Banyarwanda and the Europeans occurred in 1894 when explorer Gustav Adolf von Götzen crossed Rwanda from the south-east to Lake Kivu and met the king. The Germans did not significantly alter the social structure of the country, but exerted influence by supporting the king and the existing hierarchy and delegating power to local chiefs. Belgian forces took control of Rwanda and Burundi during World War I, and ruled the country much more directly. Both the Germans and the Belgians promoted Tutsi supremacy, considering the Hutu and Tutsi different races while downplaying the Rwandan ethnicity. In 1935, Belgium introduced identity cards labelling each individual as either Tutsi, Hutu, Twa or Naturalised. While it had previously been possible for particularly wealthy Hutu to become honorary Tutsi, the identity cards prevented any further movement between the classes. The period of Belgian rule marked the second major exodus of Banyarwanda, this time predominantly the Hutu; a 1926 change in labour laws by the Belgians allowed Rwandans to seek employment abroad, and many moved to North Kivu in the Belgian Congo as well as to the British Uganda and Tanganyika colonies. A major famine in the 1940s, as well as Belgium's desire for labourers in North Kivu, accelerated this process. The migrant Rwandans in North Kivu became known as the Banyamasisi.

=== Recent history ===
In 1959, following a decade of increasing tension between the Tutsi and the Hutu, a social revolution took place in Rwanda. Hutu activists began killing Tutsi, overturning the centuries-old Tutsi dominance amongst the Banyarwanda. The Belgians suddenly changed allegiance, becoming pro-Hutu, and the Rwandan monarchy was abolished in 1962 following a referendum. Rwanda then gained independence as a republic, under Hutu leadership. As the revolution progressed, Tutsi began leaving the country to escape the Hutu purges, settling in the four neighbouring countries Burundi, Uganda, Tanzania and Zaire. These exiles, unlike the Banyarwanda who migrated during the colonial era, began almost immediately to agitate for a return to Rwanda. They formed armed groups, known as inyenzi (cockroaches), who launched attacks into Rwanda; these were largely unsuccessful, and led to further reprisal killings of Tutsi and further Tutsi exiles. By 1964, more than 300,000 Tutsi had fled, and were forced to remain in exile for the next three decades. Pro-Hutu discrimination continued in Rwanda itself, although the violence against the Tutsi did reduce somewhat following a coup in 1973. The Twa, the minority class of the Banyarwanda, remained marginalised, and by 1990 were almost entirely forced out of the forests by the government; many became beggars.

In the 1980s, a group of 500 Banyarwanda refugees in Uganda, led by Fred Rwigyema, fought with the rebel National Resistance Army (NRA) in the Ugandan Bush War, which saw Yoweri Museveni overthrow Milton Obote. These soldiers remained in the Ugandan army following Museveni's inauguration as Ugandan president, but simultaneously began planning an invasion of Rwanda through a covert network within the army's ranks. In 1990, the soldiers broke ranks and launched an invasion of northern Rwanda as the Rwandan Patriotic Front (RPF), initiating the Rwandan Civil War; neither side was able to gain a decisive advantage, and in 1993 the Rwandan government and the RPF signed a cease-fire. This ended on 6 April 1994 when President Habyarimana's plane was shot down near Kigali Airport, killing him. The shooting down of the plane served as the catalyst for the Rwandan genocide, which began within a few hours. Over the course of approximately 100 days, between 500,000 and 1,000,000 Tutsi and non-compliant Hutu were killed in well-planned attacks on the orders of the interim government. Many Twa were also killed, despite not being directly targeted. The RPF restarted their offensive, and took control of the country methodically, gaining control of the whole country by mid-July.

The victory of the Tutsi-led rebels led to a fresh Banyarwanda exodus, this time of Hutu who feared reprisals following the genocide. The largest refugee camps formed in Zaire, and were effectively controlled by the army and government of the former Hutu regime, including many leaders of the genocide. This regime was determined to return to power in Rwanda and began rearming, killing the Rwandan Tutsis residing in Zaire and launching cross-border incursions in conjunction with the Interahamwe paramilitary group. By late 1996, the Hutu militants represented a serious threat to the new Rwandan regime, causing Paul Kagame to launch a counteroffensive. The Rwandan army joined forces with Zairian-Rwandan Tutsi groups, including the Banyamulenge and Banyamasisi (whom all formed part of the Rwandan diaspora in DRC,), attacking the refugee camps. Many refugees returned to Rwanda, while others ventured further west into Zaire. A Hutu extremist group known as the Democratic Forces for the Liberation of Rwanda, which seeks to restore the Hutu state in Rwanda, remains active in the Democratic Republic of the Congo. In 2003, the Rwandan government adopted a constitution that recategorized Hutu, Tutsi, and Twa ethnicities into a single Banyarwanda identity.

== Culture ==
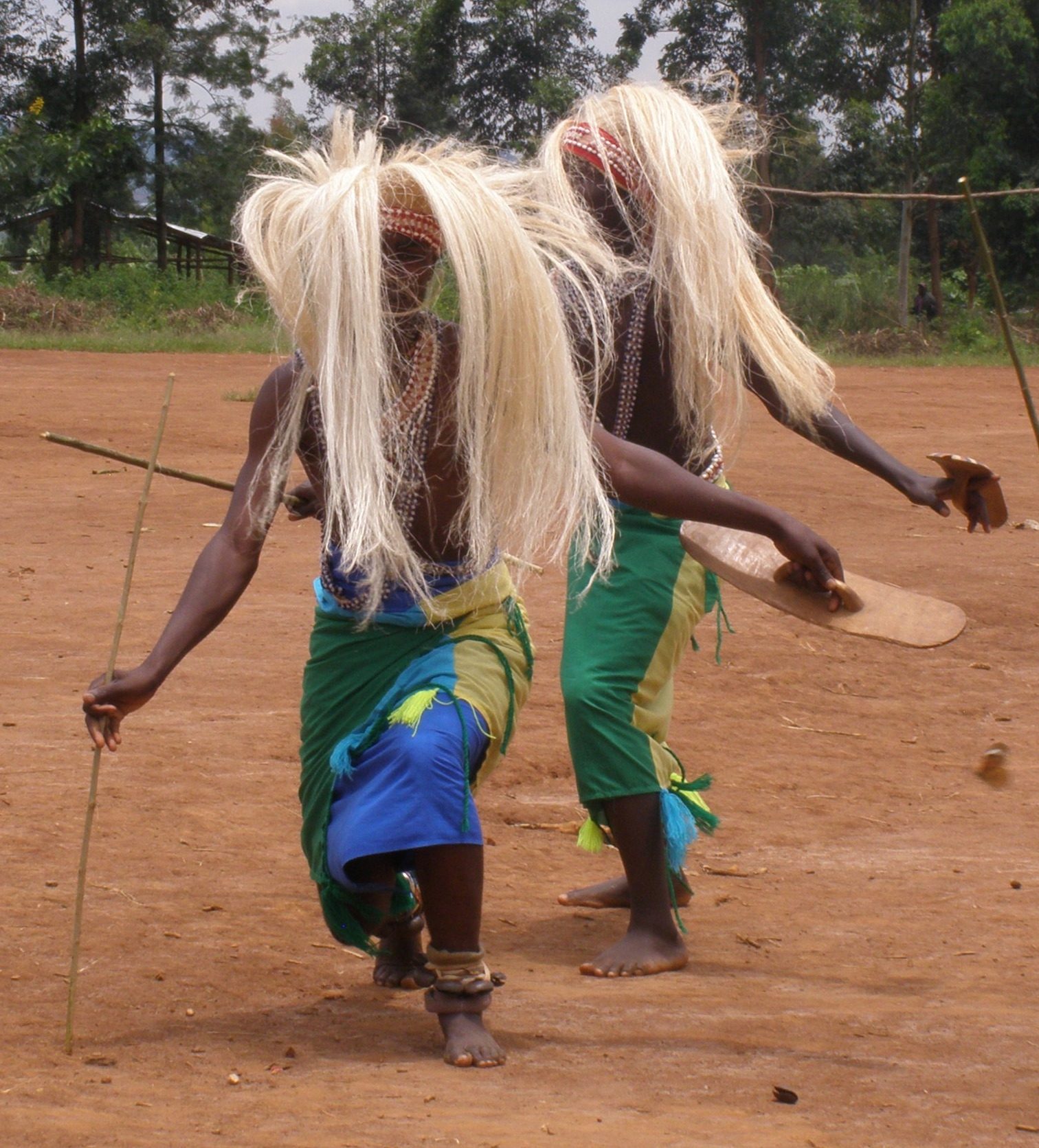
Traditional Rwandan intore dancers

Music and dance are an integral part of Banyarwanda ceremonies, festivals, social gatherings and storytelling. The most famous traditional dance is a highly choreographed routine consisting of three components: the umushagiriro, or cow dance, performed by women; the intore, or dance of heroes, performed by men; and the drumming, also traditionally performed by men, on drums known as ingoma. Traditionally, music is transmitted orally, with styles varying between the Hutu, Tutsi and Twa. Drums are of great importance; the royal drummers enjoyed high status within the court of the king. Drummers play together in groups of varying sizes, usually between seven and nine in number.

Traditionally, Rwandan women of marriageable age and high-status Rwandan men would wear the Amasunzu hairstyle, with the hair styled into elaborate crests.

A considerable amount of traditional arts and crafts is produced by the Banyarwanda, although most originated as functional items rather than purely for decoration. Woven baskets and bowls are especially common. Imigongo, a unique cow dung art, is produced in the southeast of Rwanda, with a history dating back to when the region was part of the independent Gisaka kingdom. The dung is mixed with natural soils of various colours and painted into patterned ridges to form geometric shapes. Other crafts include pottery and wood carving. Traditional housing styles make use of locally available materials; circular or rectangular mud homes with grass-thatched roofs (known as nyakatsi) are the most common. The government has initiated a programme to replace these with more modern materials such as corrugated iron.

=== Language and literature ===
Kinyarwanda is the native language of the Banyarwanda, and is spoken as a mother tongue by most Banyarwanda in Rwanda and Uganda as well as the diasporic communities in the Congo. Kinyarwanda is a Bantu language, and is mutually intelligible with Kirundi, an official language of Burundi and Ha, a language of western Tanzania; together, these languages form part of the wider dialect continuum known as Rwanda-Rundi. With more than 10 million Kinyarwanda speakers, and around 20 million for Rwanda-Rundi as a whole, it is one of the largest of the Bantu languages. The language was likely to have been introduced to the area from Cameroon during the Bantu expansion, although the timescale and nature of this migration is not known conclusively. It is likely that these migrations caused Kinyarwanda to replace the native tongue of the Twa, and the Tutsi may also have originally spoken a separate language, under the hypothesis that they migrated from Cushitic speaking regions, as the language originates with the Hutu population.

Like most other Bantu languages, Kinyarwanda is tonal and also agglutinative: most words are formed as a series of morphemes, including a prefix, a stem, and sometimes a preprefix. Nouns are divided into sixteen classes, covering both singular and plural nouns. Some of the classes are used exclusively for particular types of noun; for example classes 1 and 2 are for nouns related to people, singular and plural respectively, classes 7, 8 and 11 refer to big versions of nouns in other classes, and class 14 is for abstract nouns. Adjectives applied to nouns generally take a prefix matching the prefix of the noun. For example, the word abantu (people) is a class 2 noun with preprefix a- and prefix ba-; when applying the adjective -biri (two) to that noun, it takes the class 2 prefix ba-, so "two people" translates as abantu babiri; ibintu (things) is a class 4 noun with prefix bi-, thus "two things" translates as ibintu bibiri.

The Banyarwanda do not have a long history of written literature, and very little historical texts exist in the Kinyarwanda language. Writing was introduced during the colonial era, but most Rwandan authors of that time wrote in French. There is, however, a strong tradition of oral literature amongst the Banyarwanda. The royal court included poets (abasizi), who recited Kinyarwanda verse covering topics such as the royal lineage, as well as religion and warfare. History and moral values were also passed down through the generations by word of mouth, and the oral tradition was used as a form of entertainment in precolonial days. The most famous Rwandan literary figure was Alexis Kagame (1912–1981), who carried out and published research into oral traditions as well as writing his own poetry.

== See also ==
- Banyamulenge
