= Institute for Economic Empowerment of Women =

Non-profit organization

The Institute for Economic Empowerment of Women is an American 501(c)(3) not-for-profit organisation which, through its Peace Through Business program in Afghanistan and Rwanda, works to empower women "to grow their businesses, pursue greater entrepreneurial ventures, and become more active public policy advocates".
