= 50th Munich Security Conference =

2014 conference

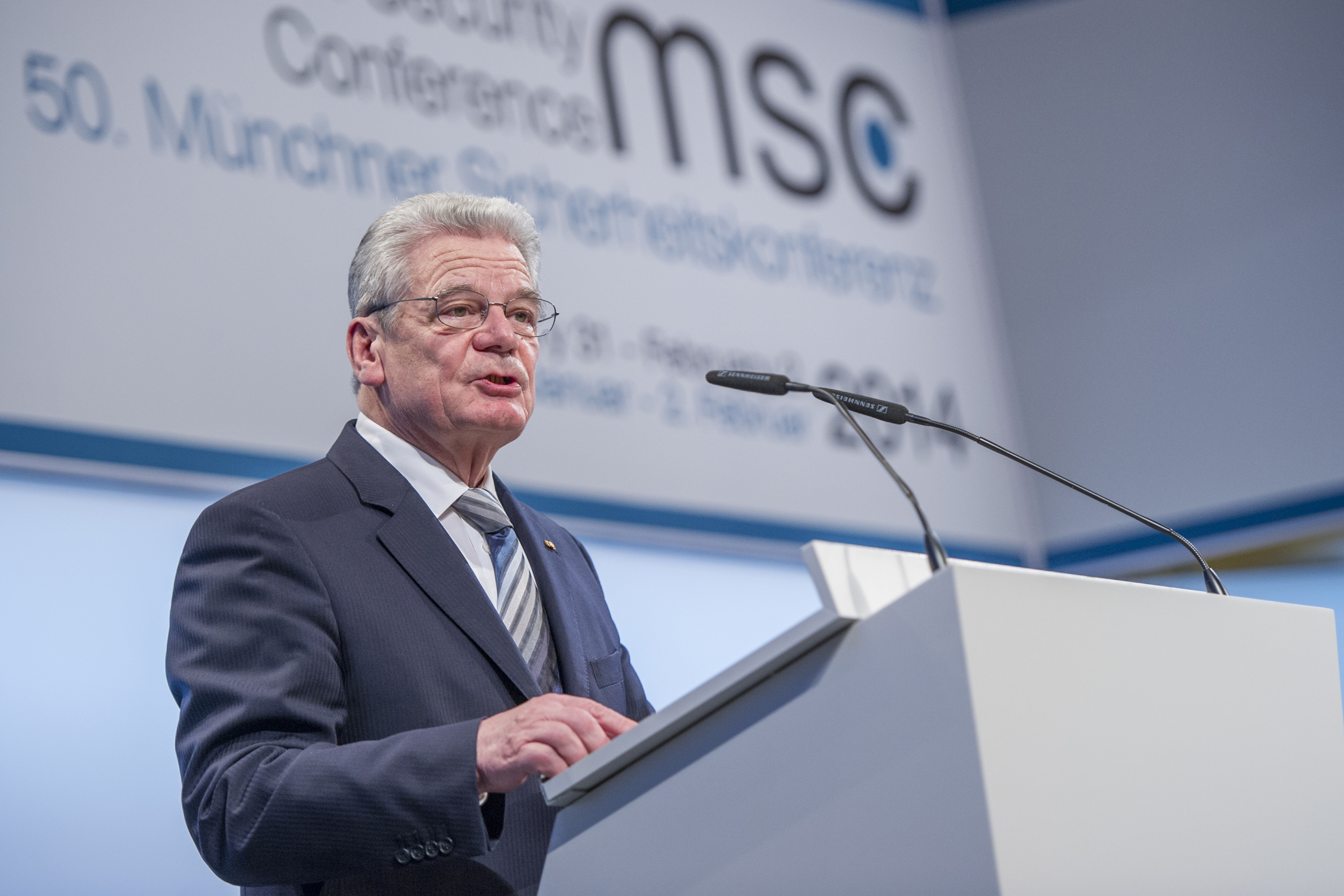
German President Joachim Gauck during his opening speech at the 50th Munich Security Conference

The 50th Munich Security Conference was held from 31 January to 2 February 2014. At the event, more than 400 international guests attended, including 20 Heads of State and Government, 50 foreign and defence ministers and 90 government delegations. Joachim Gauck was the first German Federal President to ever deliver the opening speech.

== Opening speech ==
In his speech, Gauck called for a new German foreign policy, together with a stronger foreign policy commitment from Germany, which would show a greater self-confidence and take on more responsibility. The President referred to the Federal Republic as "the best Germany we have ever had". The country should not hide behind its historic guilt. In addressing the federal government, he pleaded with it "not to flee from threats". Instead, Germany should "decisively and substantially stand up" in the defence of their own values. Finally, the President urged Germans to correct their own self-image. The previous six decades of the Federal Republic as a free and stable nation should justify the Germans having "trust and confidence" in themselves. Gauck called it a requirement for Germany to be "reliable for their partners" in the world.

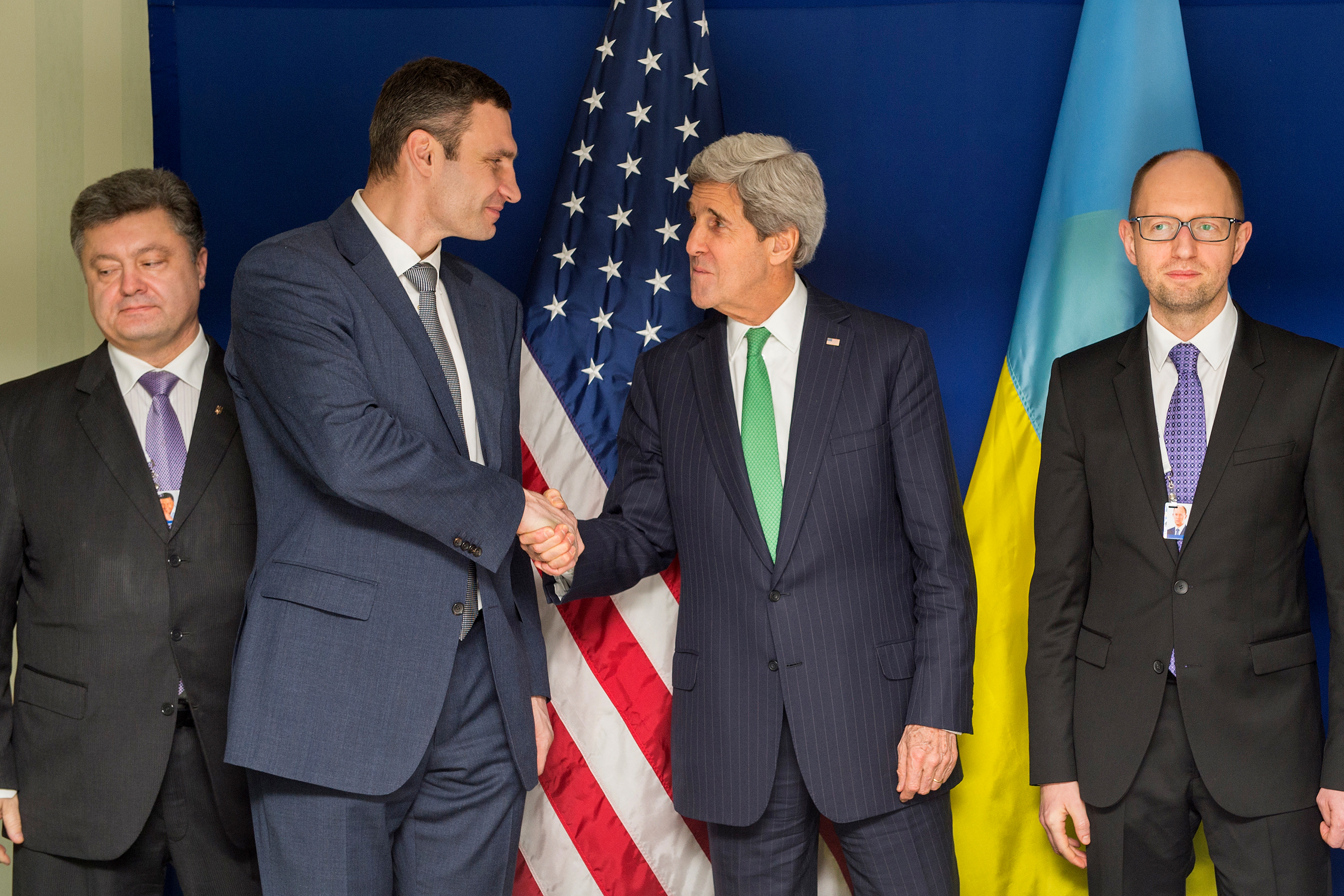
Ukrainian opposition leaders meeting John Kerry at the Munich Security Conference 2014

== Euromaidan ==
A dominant theme of the conference was the violent clashes between government and opposition in Ukraine. At the Munich Security Conference, US Secretary of State John Kerry promised the Ukrainian opposition support from the West. The Russian Foreign Minister Sergey Lavrov accused Western countries of assisting the violent uprising in Ukraine which was getting out of control. NATO Secretary General Anders Fogh Rasmussen, on the other hand, accused Russia of violating Ukraine's rights to a free choice of alliances. Ukrainian politician Vitali Klitschko accused the Ukrainian government during a panel discussion of responding with acts of terror and violence to the demands of the opposition. Klitschko called for economic sanctions against those responsible for the violence. Ukrainian Foreign Minister Leonid Kozhara dismissed the allegations that his country's political policies were directed against Europe. Since Ukraine is geographically part of Europe and also carries a very close relationship with Russia, Koschara warned, it should not be faced with the decision of "Europe or Russia". The Foreign Minister also declared that Ukraine had already met key demands of the opposition. His claims that the violence in Ukraine started from terrorists was countered by Klitschko who distributed a collection of images of the protests in Ukraine to panel participants and spectators. During the conference, Catherine Ashton, the High Representative of the Union for Foreign Affairs and Security Policy, started a mediation initiative, inviting members of the Ukrainian parties in conflict and the Foreign Ministers of important EU countries to participate. During the conference, Swiss Federal President Didier Burkhalter, in his capacity as OSCE Chairman, pointed out again an existing offer of mediation of the OSCE to the conflicting parties in Ukraine. Zbigniew Brzezinski, Leonid Kozhara, Vitali Klitschko, Leonid Slutsky, Irakli Garibashvili, Traian Băsescu and Štefan Füle participated in a panel discussion regarding the situation in Ukraine.

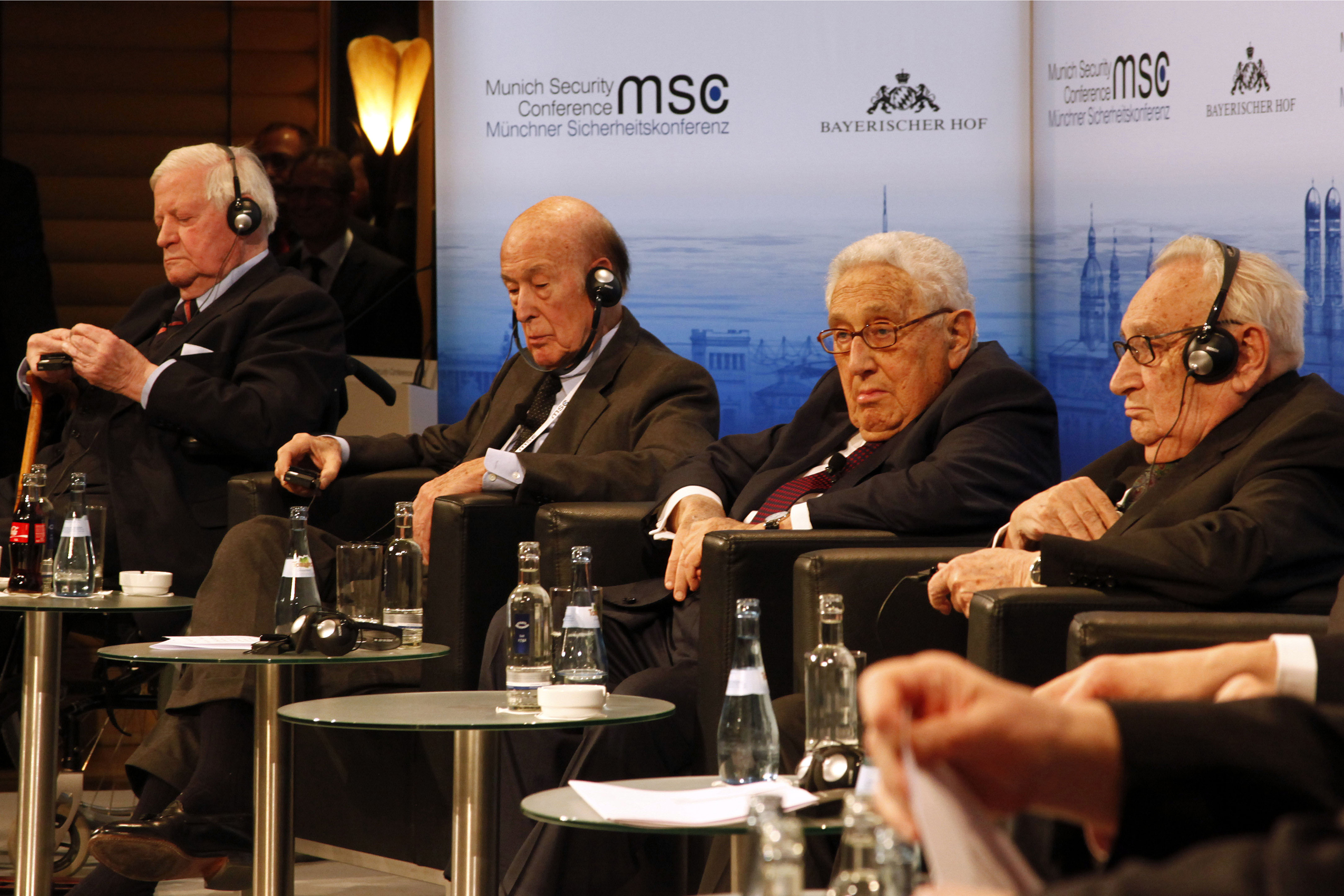
Panel on the 50th anniversary

== New security risks ==
The panel discussion on the history of the Security Conference to mark the 50th anniversary had attendances from former German Chancellor Helmut Schmidt and former US Secretary of State Henry Kissinger, who both had participated in the first Internationale Wehrkundebegegnung in 1963. Attendances in the discussions also included the former French President Valéry Giscard d'Estaing, the former German Federal Minister for Special Tasks Egon Bahr, former British Foreign Minister David Miliband and the acting Polish Foreign Minister Radosław Sikorski. During the discussions, Valéry Giscard d'Estaing pointed out that the number of major wars has decreased while the level of violence, the risk of new threats such as terrorism or cyber-attacks and the number of refugees have increased worldwide. In combination with this, the former French President justified the military interventions of his country in Africa.

Henry Kissinger also shared the assessment of an increasingly complex global security situation, which hampered the development of "coherent strategies". The former US Secretary of State cited Sino-Japanese territorial conflicts that could lead to military conflict. Kissinger pushed that Europe in turn was very "reluctant to military conflicts" and was sometimes too "hesitant" in the fight against violence, a criticism that Giscard d'Estaing already accused Europe of and linked it to "discouragement". Recalling the situation in Afghanistan and Iraq, Kissinger warned however to be cautious that the decisions of military intervention should not be influenced by a "moment of rage", if willingness is not given to such wars to "endure to the end".

Egon Bahr emphasized the risks of new, hard-to-find threats such as cyber-attacks on power grids and other infrastructure facilities. These threats had even made the US vulnerable and revealed an existing inability to defend themselves against them. Bahr further demanded a policy of deterrence analogous to that of the days of the nuclear threat. Asked about the future of NATO, Bahr, Kissinger and Giscard d'Estaing all expressed their conviction that NATO would still exist in ten years' time.

== Loss of importance for Europe ==
Former German Chancellor Schmidt said Europe was decreasing in importance. Schmidt stated that the consequences of global population growth were crucial for the continent's future. Europe will make up only seven percent of the world population in 2050, while in 1950 more than one in five people had lived in Europe. According to Schmidt, the Europeans overestimated their global significance. The former Chancellor critically regarded global urbanization, which leads to the "big urban masses", who were "easily led astray" by the temptations of modern media. Schmidt called the "power of the financial manager" another threat which despite the recent financial crisis was unabated. The current European Union policy, Schmidt described as a future hazard: "If the EU continues the way that it is, in ten years' time NATO will still be there, but maybe not the EU." David Miliband described a decline of classical foreign policy and attributed this to the fact that the electorate increasingly placed regional and national issues at the centre of importance.

== NSA Affair ==
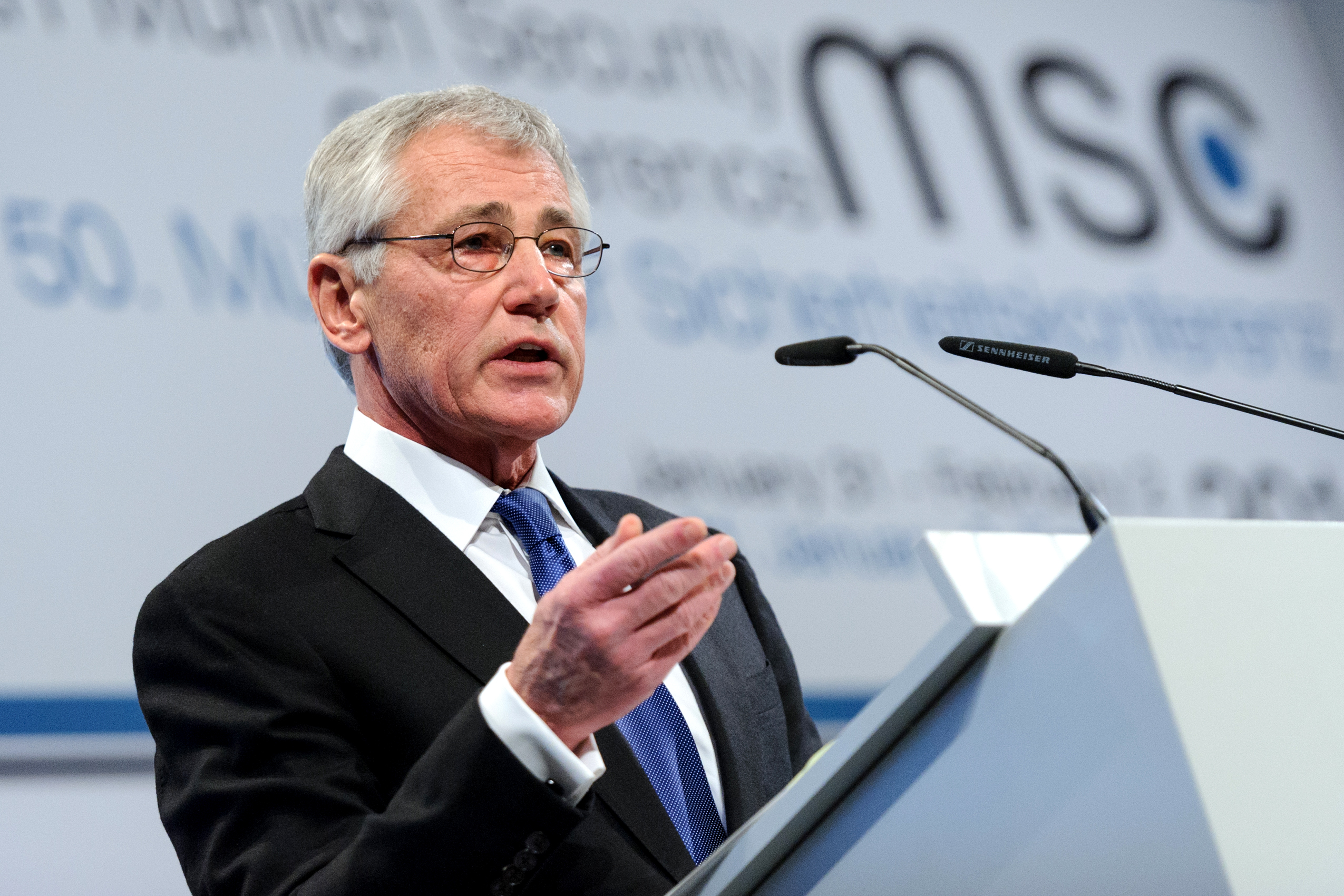
US-Secretary of Defense Hagel speaking at 50th MSC

No approaches were made towards the transatlantic conflict over NSA surveillance in Europe. The US Secretaries John Kerry and Chuck Hagel avoided any mention of this controversial subject. Instead Kerry advocated a "transatlantic renaissance" based on common values. Hagel emphasized the role of Europe as an "indispensable partner" of the United States. Both ministers campaigned for the transatlantic free trade agreement TTIP. US Senator John McCain added in relation to the NSA spying on allies as a 'credibility problem', which the American government had to deal with in order to regain lost trust. Significant criticism of the NSA spying was voiced by German Interior Minister Thomas de Maizière. Throughout the discussion he called the spying on German citizens "excessive" and demanded a "signal from the Americans to their closest partner in Europe". De Maizière declared that the political damage caused by these surveillance measures was higher than their security benefits. The Federal Minister of the Interior called the information provided by the American side completely inadequate. A possible no-spy agreement with the United States provided the Minister with no great expectations. Along with Kerry and Hagel, de Maizière agreed with a continuation of negotiations on TTIP. The German MEP Elmar Brok predicted a defeat in the vote on the TTIP agreement in the European Parliament in the event that an examination and reappraisal of the NSA's activities would fail. Company representatives from Deutsche Telekom, Huawei and Microsoft demanded a binding international standard of Internet security. Thus, Deutsche Telekom CEO Timothy Höttges called for an international agreement of digital basic rights. Microsoft Vice President Matt Thomlinson announced the opening of the company's own transparency centres, including one in Brussels, where governments could check the source code of Microsoft products to ensure that they contain no backdoors for US intelligence agencies.

== New order in former Yugoslavia ==
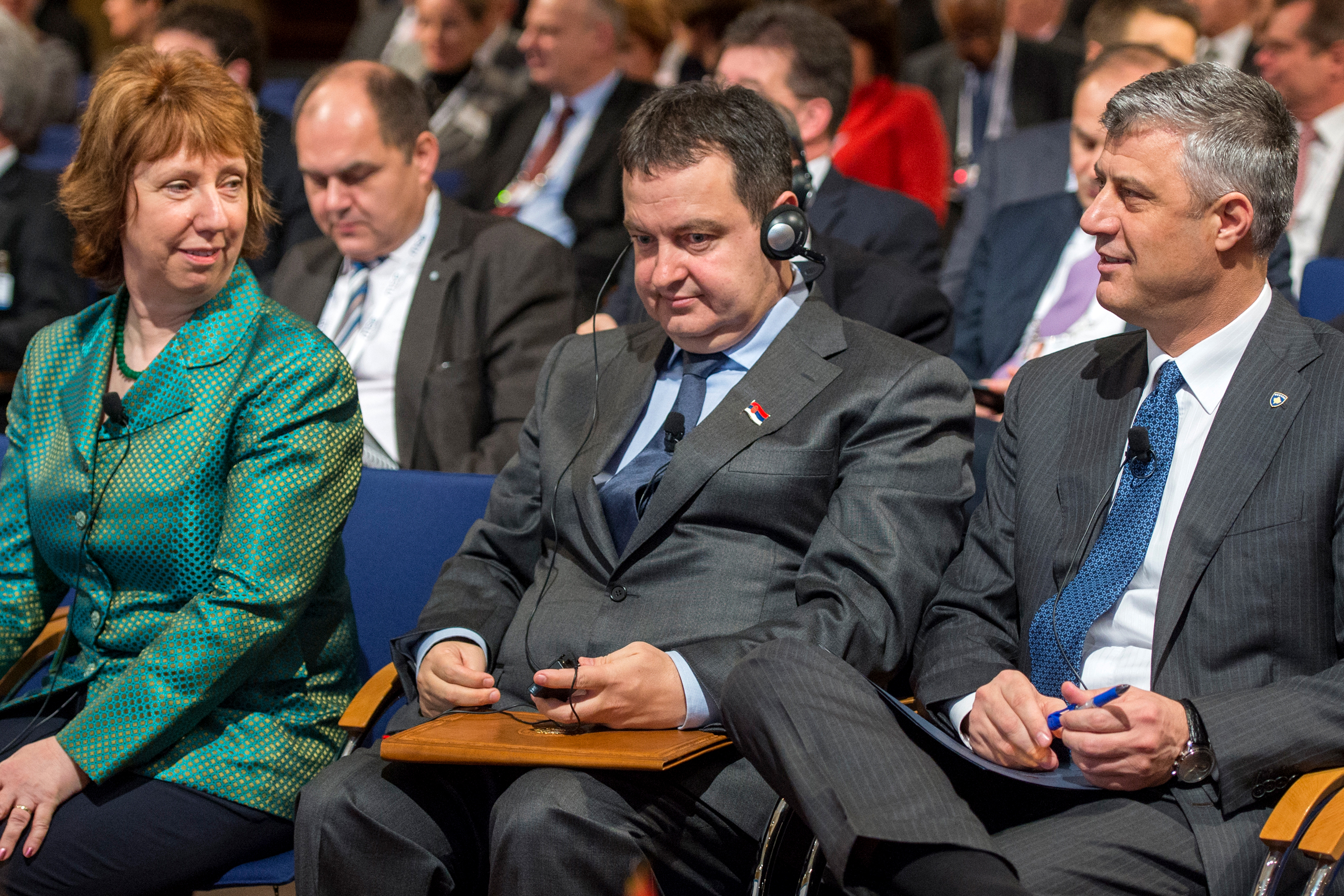
EU Representative Ashton with prime ministers Ivica Dačić and Hashim Thaçi

During the conference, the two Prime Ministers from Serbia and Kosovo, Ivica Dačić and Hashim Thaçi, came together and discussed the rapprochement between the two countries, which in 2013 had led to the signing of the normalization Agreement, under the moderation of Catherine Ashton, High Representative of the Union for Foreign Affairs and Security Policy. Both leaders reaffirmed their intention to seek solutions, "that advance the two nations". Dačić called the convergence process as a "tightrope walk" and Thaçi referred to resisters in the population that had to be overcome before the agreement.

== Middle East ==
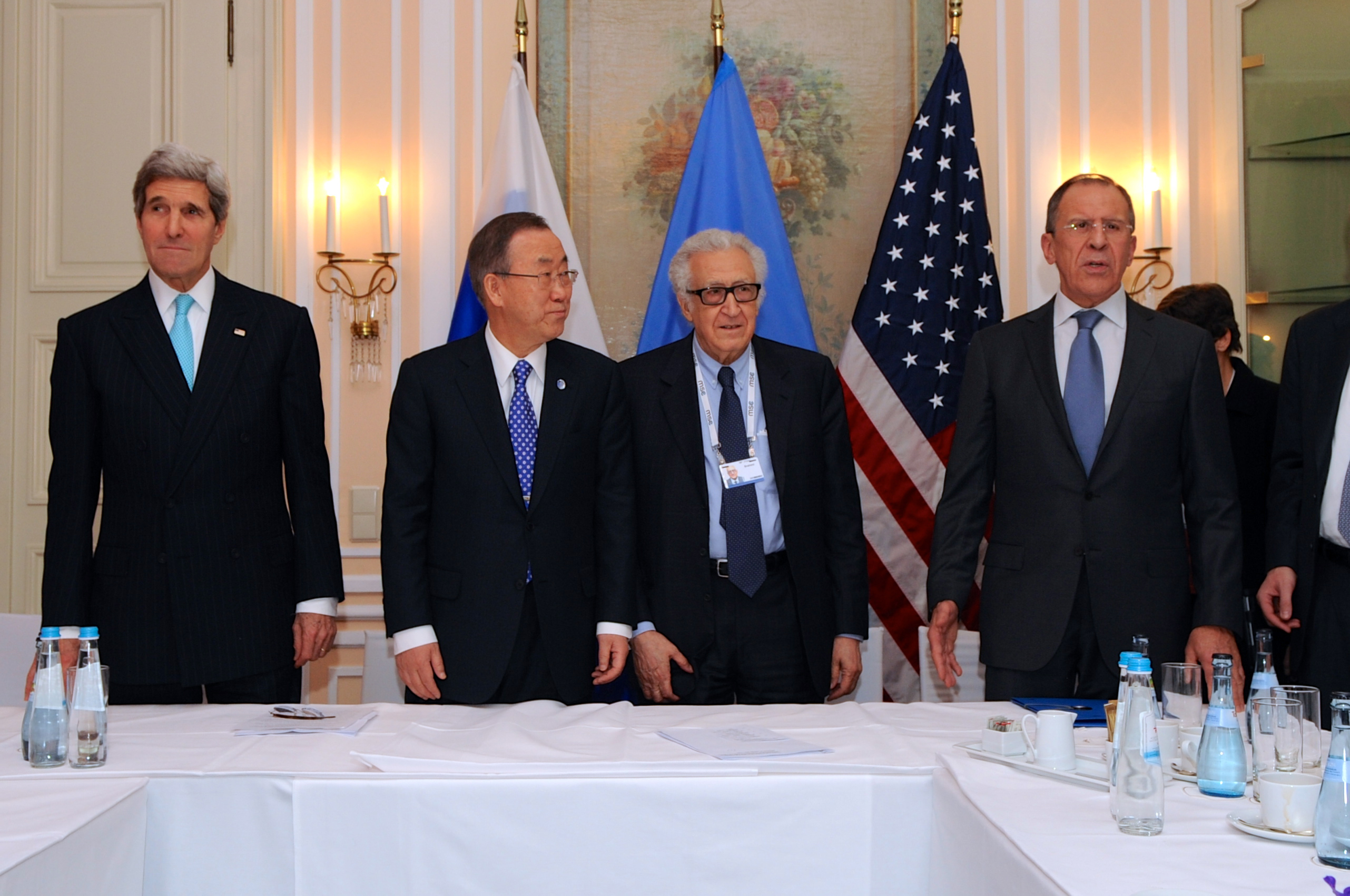
Kerry, Ban Ki-moon, Brahimi, and Lavrov before a meeting on Syria

The conference also hosted a meeting of the Middle East Quartet in which EU Representative Ashton put economic aid for Israelis and Palestinians on the table if both parties consented to a peace agreement. US Secretary of State Kerry had previously referred to a failure of the Middle East negotiations as "unacceptable". After the previously unsuccessful negotiations in Geneva of the Syrian civil war parties, discussions at the security conference took no further approach towards the Syrian conflict. Despite his announcement of follow-up negotiations, designated UN special envoy Lakhdar Brahimi stated that the international peace efforts in Syria had failed. Brahimi warned of a further escalation of the situation in Syria. UN Secretary-General Ban Ki-moon called on the parties in conflict to hold "serious and sincere" future negotiations. The Iranian Foreign Minister Mohammad Javad Zarif echoed the call of his country for a ceasefire in Syria, referring to the difficulties of monitoring such actions.

== Iran's nuclear programme ==
During a debate on Iran's nuclear program, Mohammad Javad Zarif insisted on his country's right to use nuclear energy. In connection with the forthcoming international negotiations, there were "many steps" to go, the Iranian foreign minister stated. Zarif called the previously reached agreements a significant beginning and assured the readiness of Iran to constructive negotiations. IAEA Director General Yukiya Amano spoke of positive feedback from Iran, but said that a lot of work still had to be done. Amano also pointed out that the IAEA still did not have access to all nuclear facilities and could therefore "not exclude the character of some non-peaceful Iranian activities". Israeli defense minister Moshe Ya'alon warned following the debate against too much optimism and stated that Iran will continue to develop its nuclear program throughout the course of the current negotiations. The fact that Ya'alon and the Israeli Ambassador to the UN, Ron Prosor, were among the audience during the appearance of the Iranian foreign minister was interpreted as a public gesture of rapprochement to Iran. The Iranian nuclear program was also the subject of a meeting between Zarif and US Secretary of State Kerry.

== See also ==
- Diplomacy
- International relations
- International security
- Internationalism
- Pirate Security Conference
