= Claudine Vidal =

French sociologist (born 1937)

- Born: 22 April 1937 (age 88)
- Occupation: Sociologist
- Known for: Director emerita of the French National Centre for Scientific Research (CNRS)

Claudine Vidal (born 22 April 1937) is a French sociologist and a director emerita of the French National Centre for Scientific Research (CNRS). She has conducted fieldwork in Africa for more than 20 years, especially in Sierra Leone and Rwanda and has published extensively about her findings there.

== Life and work ==
Vidal centers her research on two African countries: Rwanda (from its pre-colonial history to the genocide of Tutsi Rwandans in 1994) and Ivory Coast (the history and sociology of urbanization in its largest city Abidjan). This research has been carried out in the framework of the Centre d'Études Africaines de l'Ecole des Hautes Etudes en Sciences Sociales. She has been a leader and author with Doctors without Borders (MSF) since 1995 on many publications, and she is a member of MSF's CRASH endeavors.

== Selected works ==
- Vidal, C. (1974). "Économie de la société féodale rwandaise (The Economics of Rwanda Feudal Society)". African Studies Notebooks, 52–74.
- Vidal, C. (1977). "Gender war in Abidjan. Male, female, CFA (The Sex War in Abidjan. male, female$, )". African Studies Notebooks, 121–153.
- Vidal, C. (1986). "Funerals and social conflict in Ivory Coast". African Politics, (24), 9–19.
- Le Pape, M., & Vidal, C. (1987). "School at all costs". Proceedings of Social Science Research, 70 (1), 64–73.
- Claudine, V. I. D. A. L. (1991). Sociologie des passions:(Côte-d'Ivoire et Rwanda). KARTHALA Editions.
- Vidal, C. (1994). African Solidarity: Reexamining a Myth.
- Le Pape, M., & Vidal, C. (Eds.). (2002). Ivory Coast: the terrible year, 1999-2000. KARTHALA Editions.
- Vidal, C. (2003). "The brutalization of the Ivorian political field, 1990–2003". African Sociological Review/Revue Africaine de Sociologie, 7 (2), 45–57.
- Vidal, C. (2004). The commemoration of the genocide in Rwanda. Symbolic Violence, Forced Memorization, and Official History (Vol. 44, No. 175, pp. 575–592). Editions of the School of Advanced Studies in the Social Sciences.
- Ruzibiza, AJ, Vidal, C., & Guichaoua, A. (2005). Rwanda, the secret history (p. 494). Paris: Editions du Panama.
- "France in Rwanda. Guilty neutrality" (2019), documentary.
