= Ngano =

- Native name: Lungano (pl. Ngano)
- Stylistic origins: Venda folk music
- Cultural origins: Pre‑colonial – Venda region (northern Limpopo Province, South Africa)
- Typical instruments: Voice, hand‑claps, small percussion (sticks)

Other topics
- Folktales; moral lessons; social commentary

Ngano are traditional Venda folktale songs from the Venda region of northern South Africa. They combine narrative storytelling with melodic performance, conveying moral lessons, social commentary, and communal memories through character‑driven episodes set to music. Ngano typically open with the refrain “Salungano!”(“Here begins the story!”), summoning audience attention.

== Etymology and definition ==
The Tshivenda term ngano denotes “story” or “tale.” In musical contexts it refers to extended narrative song performances in which a solo narrator (typically an elder woman) enacts multiple characters and social roles through sung text, stylized gestures, and an antiphonal chorus response.

== Folk categorization ==
Venda musical culture recognizes highly ritualized dzingoma (e.g., ancestral reed‑pipe dances), secular mitambo dance theatre, and narrative lungano (plural ngano). Unlike the mystical dzingoma rituals and playful mitambo songs and mimes, ngano are spoken‑song folktales whose primary function is narrative and moral critique.

== Characteristics and structure ==
Ngano unfold as episodic stories, each framed by ritual invocation and a closing refrain Ha mbo di u vha ha nwana wa lungano (“This is the death of the child who is a song story”), underscoring their function as enduring moral knowledge. A lead narrator (“musimi”) sings story verses while a chorus (“vhabvumeli”) echoes fixed refrains, creating a call‑and‑response that invites audience consensus on the tale’s symbolic world. Dramatic action is conveyed through subtle head, arm, and torso movements rather than full staging or dance. Characters negotiate power relations situationally—husband, wife, outsider—using vocal timbre and rhythmic shifts, thus subverting rigid dominance–submission dichotomies.

Minimal gestures (head, arm, torso) dramatize action. Characterisation is fluid: performers shift vocal timbre and rhythm to portray husbands, wives, tricksters, or kings. Within each ngano appear both spoken‑song sections—rhythmically intoned phrases with chorus interjections—and fully melodic refrains. These elements alternate to sustain dramatic tension, preserve archaic linguistic layers, and engage listeners in collective performance.

== Themes ==
Common thematic arcs include:

- Dominance and resistance: subaltern figures (children, women, tricksters) challenge authority through cunning or satire, dramatizing resistance to oppressive norms.
- Gender dynamics: marital conflicts foreground women’s ingenuity (e.g., carving an ironwood hoe and defying patriarchal neglect).
- Social identity: stories explore intersections of class, tradition, and power, often via animal metaphors (lion as ruler, hare as trickster).

== Performance context ==
Historically performed at hearthside gatherings on cool autumn or winter evenings—after the agricultural workday and before sleep—ngano were taught by elders to family and neighbours around the cooking fire. They also featured at weddings, village meetings, or informal beer‑house sessions. Instrumental accompaniment is minimal (handclaps or sticks), focusing attention on voice and narrative.

== Notable narrators ==
Tambani Mamavhulo of Muswodi recorded a ngano illustrating female resilience: a wife, denied a hoe by her husband, carves one from ironwood, cultivates a bountiful field, and rebuffs his attempts at reconciliation.

== Decline ==
From the late 20th century onward, ngano performance declined as television, formal schooling, and modern housing disrupted traditional hearthside settings. Presently, few elder women retain the full repertoire; younger generations know only fragments, and ngano often survive in academic collections or as prescribed school texts.

== Educational anthologies ==
In order to re-integrate ngano into formal schooling, ethnomusicologist Jaco Kruger edited and authored three graded anthologies—combining field‑collected narratives, Tshivenda text, English summaries, and classroom exercises—published by the School of Music at North‑West University:

- Venda ḽashu: Tshivenda Songs, Musical Games and Song Stories (2007), eds. Jaco Kruger, Deon Coetzer & Hannes Taljaard. Contains 38 Tshivenda songs, musical games and ngano, each with pronunciation guides, English summaries, and performance notes for primary learners.
- The flamboyant rooster and other Tshivenda song stories (2008), eds. Jaco Kruger & Ina Le Roux; illus. Deon Coetzer. An illustrated collection of ten ngano in parallel Tshivenda and English text, with cultural background notes and discussion questions targeting Grades 7–12.
- The girls in the baobab: Venda stories from the Limpopo Valley (2nd ed. 2014), ed. Jaco Kruger. Fifteen village ngano presented with Tshivenda text, English translation, and pedagogical resources—including comprehension questions and enactment exercises—for secondary‑school curricula.
