= Abiru =

Aristocratic privy counsellors of the Rwandan monarchy

The Abiru (Kinyarwanda for royal ritualists) were the members of the privy council of the monarchy of Rwanda. They were oral repositories of the ubwiiru, an esoteric code of kingship. Due to the mythopoetic nature of accounts of the early history of the Abiru and the Rwandan monarchy, an accurate history of the Abiru is difficult to codify or study.

The council as a whole can be described as a priestly body that elected, advised, and/or deposed Rwandan kings. The debate continues over the pre-colonial functions of the body, which necessitates further research to substantiate definitive statements on the subject.

The wider ethnic community traditionally expected to provide the council's membership was known as the Abatsobe.

== Excerpt from the Oral Records of Rwanda ==
Kigwa (or The landed, otherwise known as Sabizeze or Izeze), a divine being, descended from the Heavens and became one of the first God-kings of Rwanda. To establish his divinely ordained authority to rule and legitimize his position and power, he subsequently created court musicians and ritualists to serve under him. These were the first abiru, and their council would go on to become the most important politico-religious institution in the kingdom that he left to his heirs.

== Functions ==
The Abiru were a secret society that functioned as advisors to the king in political matters, and may or may not have had political roles assigned to them. Their primary function as a group was to determine the continuing suitability of the king in terms of ritual and political function. Historically, the Abiru deposed 'unworthy' kings and proclaimed successors based on an esoteric code of protocols, acting as a fons honorum for Rwanda.

When considered as an ethnic group, the class of families that has provided members of the Royal Council of Abiru for centuries on a hereditary basis was referred to as "Abatsobe". Although sometimes thought of as being a distinct community, they were traditionally considered to be part of the wider Tutsi ethnicity. A Burundi near-analogue in terms of status (if not function) vis-a-vis the Tutsis would be the Ganwa.

== Notable Abiru ==
- Alexis Kagame
- Boniface Benzinge

== See also ==
- History of Rwanda
- Kingdom of Rwanda
- Rwandan Revolution
