= Bashkir literature =

Bashkir literature is the literature of the Republic of Bashkortostan, part of Russia.
