= Intore =

Traditional Burundian and Rwandan dance

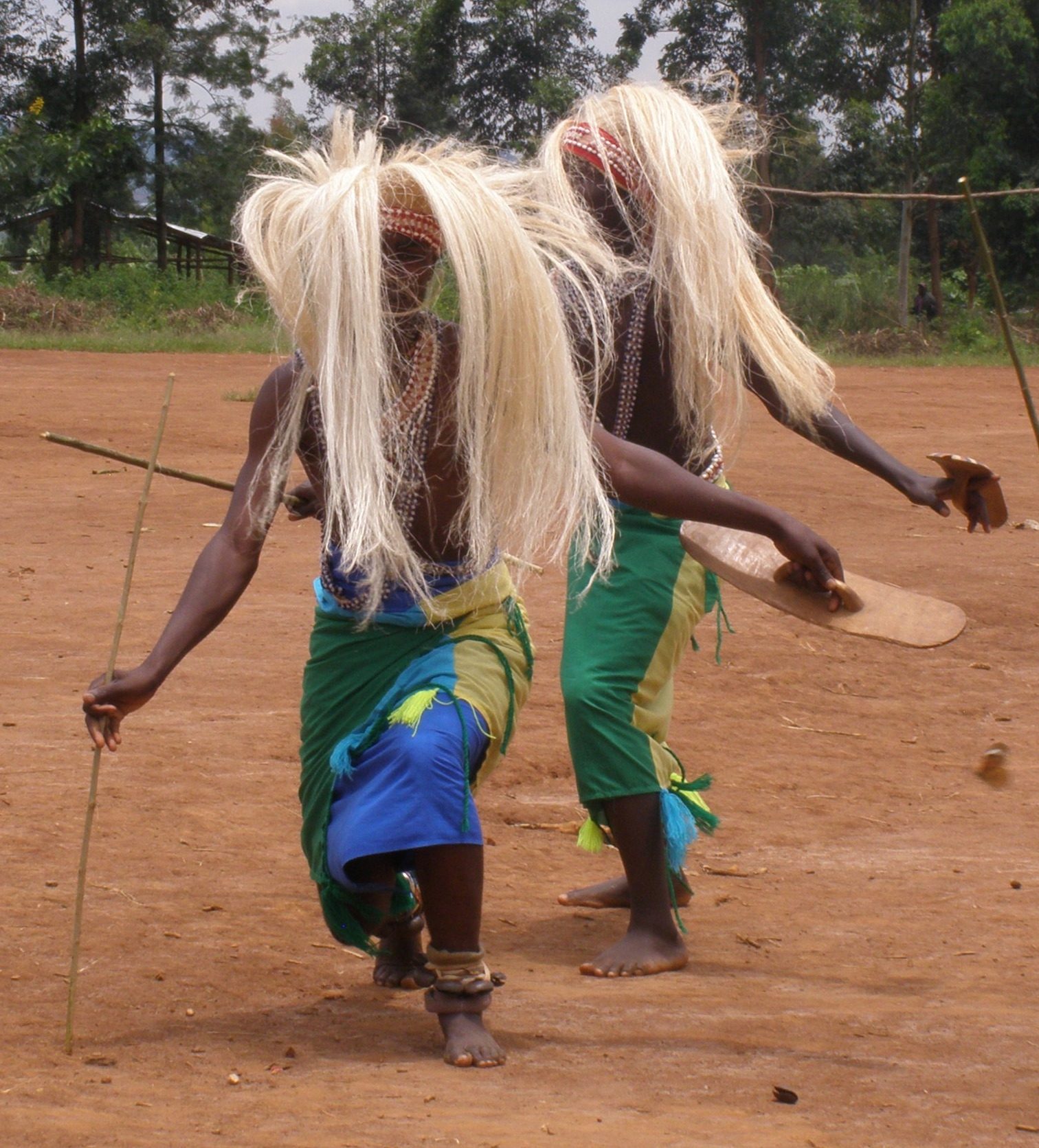
- Traditional intore dancers in Rwanda
- Genre: Traditional dance
- Instrument(s): Drums, lulunga

Intore, sometimes called the Dance of Heroes, is a traditional dance performed by men in Rwanda and Burundi; women are not allowed to do so. Intore came to Rwanda in the 1830s when the royal Muyange fled fighting in neighbouring Burundi Kingdom and was granted asylum by the King of Rwanda.

In pre-colonial times, intore was a war dance performed by the Tutsi military. Dance numbers were often war-themed, and the performing men carried actual weapons. Present-day intore dancers do not carry actual weapons, but instead use replicas. It is now performed at various celebrations and public ceremonies, including family gatherings and national events. The dance is accompanied by drum ensemble (from seven to nine drums), providing strong, almost hypnotic set of rhythms. Melodic interludes are provided by the lulunga, a harp-like instrument with eight strings.

Potential dancers are chosen based on physical and moral attributes. Before they can perform, the intore dancers receive training, where they learn the steps of the dance as well as moral values.

== Recognition as an Intangible Heritage ==
As of December 2, 2024, the Intore dance was inscribed on UNESCO's list of Intangible Cultural Heritage during the 19th session of the Intergovernmental Committee for the Safeguarding of Intangible Cultural Heritage, held in Paraguay.
