= Ubwiiru =

Ubwiiru (Kinyarwanda: Mystery) is the traditional name for the sacred code of the Monarchy of Rwanda. Encompassing songs, proverbs, laws, customs and a secret language that was used to convey all of the preceding, its custodians were the Abiru, hereditary privy counsellors to the Mwamis and their court.
