= Anne-Marie Kantengwa =

Rwandan politician

Anne-Marie Kantengwa (born 1953 in Jabana, near Kigali, Rwanda) is a businesswoman and a former Rwandan Patriotic Front (FPR) deputy in the Parliament of Rwanda.

== Early life ==
Anne Marie Kantengwa is a Rwandan genocide survivor in 1994, she lost her parents, husband, relatives and children.
