= Second Djerad government =

Algerian government

- 47th Government of Algeria
- Date formed: 23 June 2020
- Date dissolved: 21 February 2021

People and organisations
- President: Abdelmadjid Tebboune
- First Minister: Abdelaziz Djerad
- No. of ministers: 39
- Ministers removed: 1 resigned
- Total no. of members: Ministers: 39; Secretaries of State: 2
- Member parties: Independents; External support: FLN–RND–FM
- Status in legislature: Technocratic cabinet
- Opposition party: MSP; URJC; MRI; FJD; FFS; PT; RCD; MEN

History
- Election: 4 May 2017
- Predecessor: First Djerad government
- Successor: Third Djerad government

The second Djerad government (Arabic: حكومة جراد الثانية) was the forty-seventh government of the People's Democratic Republic of Algeria. It was the second government formed by Abdelaziz Djerad on 4 May 2020 under President Abdelmadjid Tebboune.

== Composition ==
=== Ministers ===
Portrait	Office	Name	Term	Party
	Prime Minister	Abdelaziz Djerad	23 June 2020 - 21 February 2021	Independent
	Minister of Interior and Local Authorities	Kamel Beldjoud	23 June 2020 - 21 February 2021	Independent
	Minister of Foreign Affairs	Sabri Boukadoum	23 June 2020 - 21 February 2021	Independent
	Minister of Justice and Keeper of the Seals	Belkacem Zeghmati	23 June 2020 - 21 February 2021	Independent
	Minister of National Defence	Abdelmadjid Tebboune	23 June 2020 - 21 February 2021	Independent
	Minister of Finance	Ayman Benabderrahmane	23 June 2020 - 21 February 2021	Independent
	Minister of Energy	Abdelmadjid Attar	23 June 2020 - 21 February 2021	Independent
	Minister of Energy Transition and Renewable Energy	Chems-Eddine Chitour	23 June 2020 - 21 February 2021	Independent
	Minister of Mojahedin	Tayeb Zitouni	23 June 2020 - 21 February 2021	National Rally for Democracy
	Minister of Religious Affairs and Waqf	Youcef Belmehdi	23 June 2020 - 21 February 2021	Independent
	Minister of National Education	Mohamed Ouadjaout	23 June 2020 - 21 February 2021	Independent
	Minister of Higher Education and Scientific Research	Abdelbaki Benziane	23 June 2020 - 21 February 2021	Independent
	Minister of Professional Education and Training	Hoyam Benfriha	23 June 2020 - 21 February 2021	Independent
	Ministry of Culture and Arts	Malika Bendouda	23 June 2020 - 21 February 2021	Independent
	Minister of Youth and Sports	Sid Ali Khaldi	23 June 2020 - 21 February 2021	Independent
	Minister of Digitization and Statistics	Mounir Khaled Berrah	23 June 2020 - 21 February 2021	Independent
	Minister of Post and Communication Technology and Information	Brahim Boumzar	23 June 2020 - 21 February 2021	Independent
	Minister of National Solidarity, Family and Women's Issues	Kaoutar Krikou	23 June 2020 - 21 February 2021	Independent
	Minister of Industry	Ferhat Ait Ali Braham	23 June 2020 - 21 February 2021	Independent
	Minister of Mines	Mohamed Arkab	23 June 2020 - 21 February 2021	Independent
	Minister of Agriculture and Rural Development	Abdelhamid Hamdane	23 June 2020 - 21 February 2021	Independent
	Minister of Housing and Urban Development	Kamel Nasri	23 June 2020 - 21 February 2021	Independent
	Minister of Trade	Kamel Rezig	23 June 2020 - 21 February 2021	Independent
	Minister of Communications and Government Spokesperson	Ammar Belhimer	23 June 2020 - 21 February 2021	Independent
	Minister of Public Works	Farouk Chadli	23 June 2020 - 21 February 2021	Independent
	Minister of Transport	Lazhar Hani	23 June 2020 - 9 January 2021	Independent
	Minister of Transport	Farouk Chadli (acting)	9 January 2021 – 21 February 2021	Independent
	Minister of Water Resources	Arezki Berraki	23 June 2020 - 21 February 2021	Independent
	Minister of Tourism, Handicrafts and Family Work	Mohamed Hamidou	23 June 2020 - 21 February 2021	Independent
	Minister of Health, Population and Hospital Reform	Abderrahmane Benbouzid	23 June 2020 - 21 February 2021	Independent
	Minister of Labour, Employment and Social Security	Ahemd Achek	23 June 2020 - 29 July 2020	Independent
	Minister of Labour, Employment and Social Security	Kaoutar Krikou (acting)	29 July 2020 – 30 September 2020	Independent
	Minister of Labour, Employment and Social Security	Al-Hashemi Jaaboub	29 July 2020 – 21 February 2021	Independent
	Minister of Relations with Parliament	Basma Azouar	23 June 2020 - 21 February 2021	Future Front
	Minister of Environment	Nassira Benharrats	23 June 2020 - 21 February 2021	Independent
	Minister of Fisheries and Fishery Productions	Sid Ahmed Ferroukhi	23 June 2020 - 21 February 2021	Independent
	Minister of Pharmaceutical Industry	Abderrahmane Lotfi Djamel Benbahmad	23 June 2020 - 21 February 2021	Independent

=== Deputy Ministers ===
Portrait	Office	Attached	Name	Term	Party
	Minister of Foresight	Prime Minister	Mohamed Cherif Belmihoub	23 June 2020 - 21 February 2021	Independent
	Minister of Microbusiness	Prime Minister	Nassim Diafat	23 June 2020 - 21 February 2021	Independent
	Minister of the Knowledge Economy and Start-ups	Prime Minister	Yacine El-Mahdi Oualid	23 June 2020 - 21 February 2021	Independent
	Minister of Foreign Trade	Minister of Trade	Aïssa Bekkai	23 June 2020 - 21 February 2021	Independent
	Minister of the Saharan Environment	Minister of Environment	Hamza Al Sid Cheikh	23 June 2020 - 21 February 2021	Independent

=== Secretaries of State ===
Portrait	Office	Attached	Name	Term	Party
	Secretary General of the Government	Prime Minister	Yahia Boukhari	23 June 2020 - 21 February 2021	Independent
	Secretary of State for Elite Sports	Minister of Youth and Sports	Salima Souakri	23 June 2020 - 21 February 2021	Independent
	Secretary of State of the Cinematic Industry	Ministry of Culture and Arts	Bachir Youcef Sehairi	23 June 2020 - 21 February 2021	Independent
