= First Djerad government =

- 46th Government of Algeria
- Date formed: 2 January 2020
- Date dissolved: 23 June 2020 (5 months and 3 weeks)

People and organisations
- President: Abdelmadjid Tebboune
- First Minister: Abdelaziz Djerad
- Member parties: Independents; Support: FLN, RND, FM, TAJ, MPA, ANR, URJC (Binaa)
- Status in legislature: Technocratic cabinet
- Opposition party: MSP, URJC (MRI and FJD), FFS, PT, RCD, MEN

History
- Election: 4 May 2017
- Predecessor: Bedoui government
- Successor: Second Djerad government

The first Djerad government (Arabic: حكومة جراد الأولى) is the forty-sixth government of the People's Democratic Republic of Algeria. It is a government formed by Abdelaziz Djerad on 2 January 2020 under President Abdelmadjid Tebboune.

== Formation ==
After holding the elections that the Army was betting on in order to end the protests, and the announcement of Abdelmadjid Tebboune's victory and his inauguration as President, the unsurprising resignation of Noureddine Bedoui came.

The First Minister Noureddine Bedoui submitted the resignation of his government on 19 December 2019, which the new President Abdelmadjid Tebboune accepted. At the same day, the TV1 has announced that the Minister of Foreign Affairs Sabri Boukadoum was named as acting First Minister by the President.

On 29 December 2019, the President of the Republic has appointed the Professor Abdelaziz Djerad as First Minister to form a new government. The composition of the government was announced on 2 January 2020 by Belaïd Mohand-Oussaïd, Spokesman of the Presidency, with a number of ministers from the previous one retained.

== Composition ==
=== Ministers ===
Portrait	Office	Name	Term	Party
	Prime Minister	Abdelaziz Djerad	2 January 2020- 23 June 2020	Independent
	Minister of Interior and Local Authorities	Kamel Beldjoud	2 January 2020- 23 June 2020	Independent
	Minister of Foreign Affairs	Sabri Boukadoum	2 January 2020- 23 June 2020	Independent
	Minister of Justice and Keeper of the Seals	Belkacem Zeghmati	2 January 2020- 23 June 2020	Independent
	Minister of National Defence	Abdelmadjid Tebboune	2 January 2020- 23 June 2020	Independent
	Minister of Finance	Abderrahmane Raouya	2 January 2020- 23 June 2020	Independent
	Minister of Energy	Mohamed Arkab	2 January 2020- 23 June 2020	Independent
	Minister of Mojahedin	Tayeb Zitouni	2 January 2020- 23 June 2020	National Rally for Democracy
	Minister of Religious Affairs and Waqf	Youcef Belmehdi	2 January 2020- 23 June 2020	Independent
	Minister of National Education	Mohamed Ouadjaout	2 January 2020- 23 June 2020	Independent
	Minister of Higher Education and Scientific Research	Chems-Eddine Chitour	2 January 2020- 23 June 2020	Independent
	Minister of Professional Education and Training	Hoyam Benfriha	2 January 2020- 23 June 2020	Independent
	Ministry of Culture and Arts	Malika Bendouda	2 January 2020- 23 June 2020	Independent
	Minister of Youth and Sports	Sid Ali Khaldi	2 January 2020- 23 June 2020	Independent
	Minister of Post and Communication Technology and Information	Brahim Boumzar	2 January 2020- 23 June 2020	Independent
	Minister of National Solidarity, Family and the Status of Women	Kaoutar Krikou	2 January 2020- 23 June 2020	Independent
	Minister of Industry and Mines	Ferhat Ait Ali Braham	2 January 2020- 23 June 2020	Independent
	Minister of Agriculture and Rural Development	Cherif Omari	2 January 2020- 23 June 2020	Independent
	Minister of Housing and Urban Development	Kamel Nasri	2 January 2020- 23 June 2020	Independent
	Minister of Trade	Kamel Rezig	2 January 2020- 23 June 2020	Independent
	Minister of Communications and Government Spokesperson	Ammar Belhimer	2 January 2020- 23 June 2020	Independent
	Minister of Public Works and Transports	Farouk Chiali	2 January 2020- 23 June 2020	Independent
	Minister of Water Resources	Arezki Berraki	2 January 2020- 23 June 2020	Independent
	Minister of Tourism, Handicrafts and Family Work	Hacène Mermouri	2 January 2020- 23 June 2020	Independent
	Minister of Health, Population and Hospital Reform	Abderrahmane Benbouzid	2 January 2020- 23 June 2020	Independent
	Minister of Labour, Employment and Social Security	Ahemd Achek	2 January 2020- 23 June 2020	Independent
	Minister of Relations with Parliament	Basma Azouar	2 January 2020- 23 June 2020	Future Front
	Minister of Environment	Nassira Benharrath	2 January 2020- 23 June 2020	Independent
	Minister of Fisheries and Fishery Productions	Sid Ahmed Ferroukhi	2 January 2020- 23 June 2020	Independent
	Minister of SMEs/SMIs and the Knowledge Economy	Yacine Djeridane	2 January 2020- 23 June 2020	Independent

=== Deputy Ministers ===
Portrait	Office	Attached	Name	Term	Party
	Minister of Statistics and Foresight	Prime Minister	Bachir Messaitfa	2 January 2020- 23 June 2020	Independent
	Minister of Desert Agriculture	Minister of Agriculture and Rural Development	Fouad Chehat	2 January 2020- 23 June 2020	Independent
	Minister of Foreign Trade	Minister of Trade	Aïssa Bekkai	2 January 2020- 23 June 2020	Independent
	Minister of Pharmaceutical Industry	Minister of Health, Population and Hospital Reform	Abderrahmane Lotfi Djamel Benbahmad	2 January 2020- 23 June 2020	Independent
	Minister of the Desert Environment	Minister of Environment	Hamza Al Sid Cheikh	2 January 2020- 23 June 2020	Independent
	Minister of Incubators	Minister of SMEs/SMIs and the Knowledge Economy	Nassim Diafat	2 January 2020- 23 June 2020	Independent
	Minister of Start-ups	Minister of SMEs/SMIs and the Knowledge Economy	Yacine Oualid	2 January 2020- 23 June 2020	Independent

=== Secretaries of State ===
Portrait	Office	Attached	Name	Term	Party
	Secretary of State for the Community and Competencies Abroad	Minister of Foreign Affairs	Rachid Bladehane	2 January 2020- 23 June 2020	Independent
	Secretary of State for the Cinematographic Industry	Ministry of Culture and Arts	Bachir Youcef Sehairi	2 January 2020- 23 June 2020	Independent
	Secretary of State for Cultural Production	Ministry of Culture and Arts	Salim Dada	2 January 2020- 23 June 2020	Independent
	Secretary of State for Elite Sport	Minister of Youth and Sports	Noureddine Morceli	2 January 2020- 23 June 2020	Independent

=== Secretary General ===
Portrait	Office	Attached	Name	Term	Party
	Secretary General of the Government	Prime Minister	Yahia Boukhari	2 January 2020- 23 June 2020	Independent
