= Third Djerad government =

2021 government in Algeria

- 48th Government of Algeria
- Incumbent
- Date formed: 21 February 2021
- Date dissolved: 7 July 2021

People and organisations
- President: Abdelmadjid Tebboune
- First Minister: Abdelaziz Djerad
- No. of ministers: 34
- Total no. of members: Ministers: 34; Secretaries of State: 2
- Member parties: Independents; External support: FLN–RND–FM
- Status in legislature: Technocratic cabinet
- Opposition party: MSP – URJC (MRI and FJD) – FFS – PT – RCD – MEN

History
- Election: 4 May 2017
- Legislature term: 8th Assembly
- Predecessor: Second Djerad government
- Successor: Benabderrahmane government

The third Djerad government (Arabic: حكومة جراد الثالثة) was the forty-eighth government of the People's Democratic Republic of Algeria. It is the third government formed by Abdelaziz Djerad on 21 February 2021 under President Abdelmadjid Tebboune.

== Composition ==
=== Ministers ===
Portrait	Office	Name	Term	Party
	Prime Minister	Abdelaziz Djerad	21 February 2021 - 7 July 2021	Independent
	Minister of National Defence	Abdelmadjid Tebboune	21 February 2021 - 7 July 2021	Independent
	Minister of Foreign Affairs	Sabri Boukadoum	21 February 2021 - 7 July 2021	Independent
	Minister of Interior and Local Authorities	Kamel Beldjoud	21 February 2021 - 7 July 2021	Independent
	Minister of Justice and Keeper of the Seals	Belkacem Zeghmati	21 February 2021 - 7 July 2021	Independent
	Minister of Finance	Ayman Benabderrahmane	21 February 2021 - 7 July 2021	Independent
	Minister of Energy and Mines	Mohamed Arab	21 February 2021 - 7 July 2021	Independent
	Minister of Energy Transition and Renewable Energy	Chems-Eddine Chitour	21 February 2021 - 7 July 2021	Independent
	Minister of Mojahedin	Tayeb Zitouni	21 February 2021 - 7 July 2021	National Rally for Democracy
	Minister of Religious Affairs and Waqf	Youcef Belmehdi	21 February 2021 - 7 July 2021	Independent
	Minister of National Education	Mohamed Ouadjaout	21 February 2021 - 7 July 2021	Independent
	Minister of Higher Education and Scientific Research	Abdelbaki Benziane	21 February 2021 - 7 July 2021	Independent
	Minister of Professional Education and Training	Hoyam Benfriha	21 February 2021 - 7 July 2021	Independent
	Ministry of Culture and Arts	Malika Bendouda	21 February 2021 - 7 July 2021	Independent
	Minister of Youth and Sports	Sid Ali Khaldi	21 February 2021 - 7 July 2021	Independent
	Minister of Digitization and Statistics	Mounir Khaled Berrah	21 February 2021 - 7 July 2021	Independent
	Minister of Post and Communication Technology and Information	Brahim Boumzar	21 February 2021 - 7 July 2021	Independent
	Minister of National Solidarity, Family and the Status of Women	Kaoutar Krikou	21 February 2021 - 7 July 2021	Independent
	Minister of Industry	Mohamed Bacha	21 February 2021 - 7 July 2021	Independent
	Minister of Agriculture and Rural Development	Abdelhamid Hamdane	21 February 2021 - 7 July 2021	Independent
	Minister of Housing and Urban Development	Tarek Belarbi	21 February 2021 - 7 July 2021	Independent
	Minister of Trade	Kamel Rezig	21 February 2021 - 7 July 2021	Independent
	Minister of Communications and Government Spokesperson	Ammar Belhimer	21 February 2021 - 7 July 2021	Independent
	Minister of Public Works and Transports	Kamel Nasri	21 February 2021 - 7 July 2021	Independent
	Minister of Water Resources	Kamel Mihoubi	21 February 2021 - 7 July 2021	Independent
	Minister of Tourism, Handicrafts and Family Work	Mohamed Ali Boughazi	21 February 2021 - 7 July 2021	Independent
	Minister of Health, Population and Hospital Reform	Abderrahmane Benbouzid	21 February 2021 - 7 July 2021	Independent
	Minister of Labour, Employment and Social Security	Al-Hashemi Jaaboub	21 February 2021 - 7 July 2021	Independent
	Minister of Relations with Parliament	Bessma Azouar	21 February 2021 - 7 July 2021	Future Front
	Minister of Environment	Dalila Boudjemaa	21 February 2021 - 7 July 2021	Independent
	Minister of Fisheries and Fishery Productions	Sid Ahmed Ferroukhi	21 February 2021 - 7 July 2021	Independent
	Minister of Pharmaceutical Industry	Abderrahmane Lotfi Djamel Benbahmad	21 February 2021 - 7 July 2021	Independent

=== Deputy Ministers (Deleguate Ministers) ===
Portrait	Office	Attached	Name	Term	Party
	Minister of Microbusiness	Prime Minister	Nassim Diafat	21 February 2021 - 7 July 2021	Independent
	Minister of the Knowledge Economy and Start-ups	Prime Minister	Yacine El-Mahdi Oualid	21 February 2021 - 7 July 2021	Independent

=== Secretaries of State ===
Portrait	Office	Attached	Name	Term	Party
	Secretary of State for Elite Sports	Minister of Youth and Sports	Salima Souakri	21 February 2021 - 7 July 2021	Independent

=== Secretary General ===
Portrait	Office	Attached	Name	Term	Party
	Secretary General of the Government	Prime Minister	Yahia Boukhari	21 February 2021 - 7 July 2021	Independent
