= List of heads of government of Algeria =

This is a list of heads of government of Algeria since the establishment of the Provisional Government of the Algerian Republic (GPRA) in exile in Cairo, Egypt in 1958, during the Algerian War, through independence in 1962, to the present.

A total of twenty-one individuals have served as head of government (excluding two Presidents of the GPRA and two Acting Prime Ministers). Among them, Ahmed Ouyahia is notable for having held the office on three non-consecutive occasions.

== List of officeholders ==
Political parties

National Liberation Front
Party of the Socialist Revolution
National Rally for Democracy

Other factions

Military
Independent

No.	Portrait	Name (Birth–Death)	Term of office			Political party	Legislature (Election)	Cabinet(s)	Head(s) of state (Term)	Ref.
No.	Portrait	Name (Birth–Death)	Took office	Left office	Time in office	Political party	Legislature (Election)	Cabinet(s)	Head(s) of state (Term)	Ref.
President of the Provisional Government
—		Ferhat Abbas فرحات عباس (1899–1985)	19 September 1958	9 August 1961	2 years, 324 days	National Liberation Front	None	First government	Ferhat Abbas (1958–1961)	
—		Ferhat Abbas فرحات عباس (1899–1985)	19 September 1958	9 August 1961	2 years, 324 days	National Liberation Front	None	Second government	Ferhat Abbas (1958–1961)	
—		Benyoucef Benkhedda بن يوسف بن خدة (1920–2003)	9 August 1961	27 September 1962	1 year, 49 days	National Liberation Front	None	Third government	Benyoucef Benkhedda (1961–1962)	
—		Benyoucef Benkhedda بن يوسف بن خدة (1920–2003)	9 August 1961	27 September 1962	1 year, 49 days	National Liberation Front	None	Third government	Abderrahmane Farès (1962)	
Head of Government
1		Ahmed Ben Bella أحمد بن بلّة (1916–2012)	27 September 1962	15 September 1963	353 days	National Liberation Front	I (1962)	Bella I	Ferhat Abbas (1962–1963)	
President of the Republic
—		Ahmed Ben Bella أحمد بن بلّة (1916–2012)	15 September 1963	19 June 1965	1 year, 277 days	National Liberation Front	II (1963)	Bella II	Himself	
—		Ahmed Ben Bella أحمد بن بلّة (1916–2012)	15 September 1963	19 June 1965	1 year, 277 days	National Liberation Front	II (1963)	Bella III	Himself	
Chairman of Revolutionary Council
—		Houari Boumédiène هواري بومدين (1932–1978)	19 June 1965	10 December 1976	11 years, 174 days	National Liberation Front	—	Boumédiène I	Himself	
—		Houari Boumédiène هواري بومدين (1932–1978)	19 June 1965	10 December 1976	11 years, 174 days	National Liberation Front	—	Boumédiène II	Himself	
—		Houari Boumédiène هواري بومدين (1932–1978)	19 June 1965	10 December 1976	11 years, 174 days	National Liberation Front	—	Boumédiène III	Himself	
President of the Republic
—		Houari Boumédiène هواري بومدين (1932–1978)	10 December 1976	27 December 1978 #	2 years, 17 days	National Liberation Front	(1976)	Boumédiène IV	Himself	
Prime Minister
2		Mohamed Ben Ahmed Abdelghani محمد بن أحمد عبد الغني (1927–1996)	8 March 1979	22 January 1984	4 years, 320 days	National Liberation Front	III (1977)	Abdelghani I	Chadli Bendjedid (1979–1992)	
2		Mohamed Ben Ahmed Abdelghani محمد بن أحمد عبد الغني (1927–1996)	8 March 1979	22 January 1984	4 years, 320 days	National Liberation Front	III (1977)	Abdelghani II	Chadli Bendjedid (1979–1992)	
2		Mohamed Ben Ahmed Abdelghani محمد بن أحمد عبد الغني (1927–1996)	8 March 1979	22 January 1984	4 years, 320 days	National Liberation Front	IV (1982)	Abdelghani III	Chadli Bendjedid (1979–1992)	
3		Abdelhamid Brahimi عبد الحميد براهيمي (1936–2021)	22 January 1984	5 November 1988	4 years, 288 days	National Liberation Front	IV (1982)	Brahimi I	Chadli Bendjedid (1979–1992)	
3		Abdelhamid Brahimi عبد الحميد براهيمي (1936–2021)	22 January 1984	5 November 1988	4 years, 288 days	National Liberation Front	IV (1982)	Brahimi II	Chadli Bendjedid (1979–1992)	
Head of Government
4		Kasdi Merbah قاصدي مرباح (1938–1993)	5 November 1988	9 September 1989	308 days	National Liberation Front	V (1987)	Merbah	Chadli Bendjedid (1979–1992)	
5		Mouloud Hamrouche مولود حمروش (born 1943)	9 September 1989	5 June 1991	1 year, 269 days	National Liberation Front	V (1987)	Hamrouche	Chadli Bendjedid (1979–1992)	
6		Sid Ahmed Ghozali سيد أحمد غزالي (1937–2025)	5 June 1991	8 July 1992	1 year, 33 days	National Liberation Front	V (1987)	Ghozali I	Chadli Bendjedid (1979–1992)	
6		Sid Ahmed Ghozali سيد أحمد غزالي (1937–2025)	5 June 1991	8 July 1992	1 year, 33 days	National Liberation Front	V (1987)	Ghozali II	Chadli Bendjedid (1979–1992)	
6		Sid Ahmed Ghozali سيد أحمد غزالي (1937–2025)	5 June 1991	8 July 1992	1 year, 33 days	National Liberation Front	National Consultative Council (1992)	Ghozali II	Mohamed Boudiaf (1992)	
7		Belaid Abdessalam بلعيد عبد السلام (1928–2020)	8 July 1992	21 August 1993	1 year, 44 days	National Liberation Front	National Consultative Council (1992)	Abdesslam	Ali Kafi (1992–1994)	
8		Redha Malek رضا مالك (1931–2017)	21 August 1993	11 April 1994	233 days	Independent		Malek	Ali Kafi (1992–1994)	
9		Mokdad Sifi مقداد سيفي (born 1940)	11 April 1994	31 December 1995	1 year, 264 days	National Liberation Front	National Transitional Council (1994)	Sifi I	Liamine Zéroual (1994–1999)	
9		Mokdad Sifi مقداد سيفي (born 1940)	11 April 1994	31 December 1995	1 year, 264 days	National Liberation Front	National Transitional Council (1994)	Sifi II	Liamine Zéroual (1994–1999)	
10		Ahmed Ouyahia أحمد أويحيى (born 1952)	31 December 1995	15 December 1998	2 years, 349 days	Independent	National Transitional Council (1994)	Ouyahia I	Liamine Zéroual (1994–1999)	
10		Ahmed Ouyahia أحمد أويحيى (born 1952)	31 December 1995	15 December 1998	2 years, 349 days	National Rally for Democracy	VI (1997)	Ouyahia II	Liamine Zéroual (1994–1999)	
11		Smail Hamdani اسماعيل حمداني (1930–2017)	15 December 1998	23 December 1999	1 year, 8 days	National Liberation Front	VI (1997)	Hamdani	Liamine Zéroual (1994–1999)	
12		Ahmed Benbitour أحمد بن بيتور (born 1946)	23 December 1999	27 August 2000	248 days	Independent	VI (1997)	Benbitour	Abdelaziz Bouteflika (1999–2019)	
13		Ali Benflis على بن فليس (born 1944)	27 August 2000	13 August 2004	3 years, 352 days	National Liberation Front	VI (1997)	Benflis I	Abdelaziz Bouteflika (1999–2019)	
13		Ali Benflis على بن فليس (born 1944)	27 August 2000	13 August 2004	3 years, 352 days	National Liberation Front	VI (1997)	Benflis II	Abdelaziz Bouteflika (1999–2019)	
13		Ali Benflis على بن فليس (born 1944)	27 August 2000	13 August 2004	3 years, 352 days	National Liberation Front	VII (2002)	Benflis III	Abdelaziz Bouteflika (1999–2019)	
(10)		Ahmed Ouyahia أحمد أويحيى (born 1952)	13 August 2004	24 May 2006	1 year, 284 days	National Rally for Democracy	VII (2002)	Ouyahia III	Abdelaziz Bouteflika (1999–2019)	
(10)		Ahmed Ouyahia أحمد أويحيى (born 1952)	13 August 2004	24 May 2006	1 year, 284 days	National Rally for Democracy	VII (2002)	Ouyahia IV	Abdelaziz Bouteflika (1999–2019)	
(10)		Ahmed Ouyahia أحمد أويحيى (born 1952)	13 August 2004	24 May 2006	1 year, 284 days	National Rally for Democracy	VII (2002)	Ouyahia V	Abdelaziz Bouteflika (1999–2019)	
14		Abdelaziz Belkhadem عبد العزيز بلخادم (born 1945)	24 May 2006	23 June 2008	2 years, 30 days	National Liberation Front	VII (2002)	Belkhadem I	Abdelaziz Bouteflika (1999–2019)	
14		Abdelaziz Belkhadem عبد العزيز بلخادم (born 1945)	24 May 2006	23 June 2008	2 years, 30 days	National Liberation Front	VIII (2007)	Belkhadem II	Abdelaziz Bouteflika (1999–2019)	
Prime Minister
(10)		Ahmed Ouyahia أحمد أويحيى (born 1952)	23 June 2008	3 September 2012	4 years, 72 days	National Rally for Democracy	VIII (2007)	Ouyahia VI	Abdelaziz Bouteflika (1999–2019)	
(10)		Ahmed Ouyahia أحمد أويحيى (born 1952)	23 June 2008	3 September 2012	4 years, 72 days	National Rally for Democracy	VIII (2007)	Ouyahia VII	Abdelaziz Bouteflika (1999–2019)	
(10)		Ahmed Ouyahia أحمد أويحيى (born 1952)	23 June 2008	3 September 2012	4 years, 72 days	National Rally for Democracy	VIII (2007)	Ouyahia VIII	Abdelaziz Bouteflika (1999–2019)	
(10)		Ahmed Ouyahia أحمد أويحيى (born 1952)	23 June 2008	3 September 2012	4 years, 72 days	National Rally for Democracy	VIII (2007)	Ouyahia IX	Abdelaziz Bouteflika (1999–2019)	
15		Abdelmalek Sellal عبد المالك سلال (born 1948)	3 September 2012	13 March 2014	1 year, 191 days	National Liberation Front	IX (2012)	Sellal I	Abdelaziz Bouteflika (1999–2019)	
15		Abdelmalek Sellal عبد المالك سلال (born 1948)	3 September 2012	13 March 2014	1 year, 191 days	National Liberation Front	IX (2012)	Sellal II	Abdelaziz Bouteflika (1999–2019)	
—		Youcef Yousfi يوسف اليوسفي (born 1941) acting	13 March 2014	29 April 2014	47 days	National Rally for Democracy	IX (2012)	Sellal II	Abdelaziz Bouteflika (1999–2019)	
(15)		Abdelmalek Sellal عبد المالك سلال (born 1948)	29 April 2014	25 May 2017	3 years, 26 days	National Liberation Front	IX (2012)	Sellal III	Abdelaziz Bouteflika (1999–2019)	
(15)		Abdelmalek Sellal عبد المالك سلال (born 1948)	29 April 2014	25 May 2017	3 years, 26 days	National Liberation Front	IX (2012)	Sellal IV	Abdelaziz Bouteflika (1999–2019)	
16		Abdelmadjid Tebboune عبد المجيد تبون (born 1945)	25 May 2017	15 August 2017	82 days	National Liberation Front	X (2017)	Tebboune	Abdelaziz Bouteflika (1999–2019)	
(10)		Ahmed Ouyahia أحمد أويحيى (born 1952)	16 August 2017	12 March 2019	1 year, 208 days	National Rally for Democracy	X (2017)	Ouyahia X	Abdelaziz Bouteflika (1999–2019)	
17		Noureddine Bedoui نور الدين بدوي (born 1959)	12 March 2019	19 December 2019	282 days	Independent	X (2017)	Bedoui	Abdelaziz Bouteflika (1999–2019)	
17		Noureddine Bedoui نور الدين بدوي (born 1959)	12 March 2019	19 December 2019	282 days	Independent	X (2017)	Bedoui	Abdelkader Bensalah (2019)	
—		Sabri Boukadoum صبري بوقادوم (born 1958) acting	19 December 2019	28 December 2019	9 days	Independent	X (2017)	Bedoui	Abdelmadjid Tebboune (since 2019)	
18		Abdelaziz Djerad عبد العزيز جراد (born 1954)	28 December 2019	30 June 2021	1 year, 184 days	National Liberation Front	X (2017)	Djerad I	Abdelmadjid Tebboune (since 2019)	
18		Abdelaziz Djerad عبد العزيز جراد (born 1954)	28 December 2019	30 June 2021	1 year, 184 days	National Liberation Front	X (2017)	Djerad II	Abdelmadjid Tebboune (since 2019)	
18		Abdelaziz Djerad عبد العزيز جراد (born 1954)	28 December 2019	30 June 2021	1 year, 184 days	National Liberation Front	X (2017)	Djerad III	Abdelmadjid Tebboune (since 2019)	
19		Aymen Benabderrahmane أيمن بن عبد الرحمان (born 1966)	30 June 2021	11 November 2023	2 years, 134 days	Independent	XI (2021)	Benabderrahmane I	Abdelmadjid Tebboune (since 2019)	
19		Aymen Benabderrahmane أيمن بن عبد الرحمان (born 1966)	30 June 2021	11 November 2023	2 years, 134 days	Independent	XI (2021)	Benabderrahmane II	Abdelmadjid Tebboune (since 2019)	
19		Aymen Benabderrahmane أيمن بن عبد الرحمان (born 1966)	30 June 2021	11 November 2023	2 years, 134 days	Independent	XI (2021)	Benabderrahmane III	Abdelmadjid Tebboune (since 2019)	
20		Nadir Larbaoui نذير العرباوي (born 1949)	11 November 2023	28 August 2025	1 year, 290 days	Independent	XI (2021)	Larbaoui I	Abdelmadjid Tebboune (since 2019)	
20		Nadir Larbaoui نذير العرباوي (born 1949)	11 November 2023	28 August 2025	1 year, 290 days	Independent	XI (2021)	Larbaoui II	Abdelmadjid Tebboune (since 2019)	
—		Sifi Ghrieb سيفي غريب (born 1971)	28 August 2025	14 September 2025	17 days	Independent	XI (2021)	Larbaoui II	Abdelmadjid Tebboune (since 2019)	
21		Sifi Ghrieb سيفي غريب (born 1971)	14 September 2025	Incumbent	1 year, 51 days	Independent	XI (2021)	Ghrieb	Abdelmadjid Tebboune (since 2019)	

== Timeline ==
This is a graphical lifespan timeline of the heads of government of Algeria. They are listed in order of first assuming office.

The following chart lists heads of government by lifespan (living heads of government on the green line), with the years outside of their tenure in beige. Heads of government with an unknown birth date or death date are shown with only their tenure or their earlier or later life.

The following chart shows heads of government by their age (living heads of government in green), with the years of their tenure in blue. Heads of government with an unknown birth or death date are excluded.

== See also ==
- List of French governors of Algeria
- President of Algeria
  - List of heads of state of Algeria
- Prime Minister of Algeria
