= Benabderrahmane government =

- 49th Cabinet of Algeria
- Incumbent
- Date formed: 7 July 2021
- Date dissolved: 11 November 2023

People and organisations
- President: Abdelmadjid Tebboune
- First Minister: Aymen Benabderrahmane
- Total no. of members: 34
- Member parties: FLN; Independents; RND; Binaa; FM
- Status in legislature: Coalition
- Opposition parties: MSP

History
- Election: 12 June 2021
- Legislature term: 9th Assembly
- Predecessor: Third Djerad government
- Successor: Larbaoui government

The Benabderrahmane government (Arabic: حكومة بن عبد الرحمان) was the forty-ninth government of the People's Democratic Republic of Algeria. It was a government formed by Aymen Benabderrahmane under President Abdelmadjid Tebboune, following 2021 legislative election and the dissolution of the Third Djerad government on 7 July 2021.

== Composition ==
=== Ministers ===
Portrait	Portfolio	Name	Term	Party
	Prime Minister	Aymen Benabderrahmane	7 July 2021 – 11 November 2023	Independent
	Minister of National Defence	Abdelmadjid Tebboune	7 July 2021 – present	Independent
	Minister of Foreign Affairs	Ramtane Lamamra	7 July 2021 – 11 November 2023	Independent
	Minister of Interior and Local Authorities	Kamel Beldjoud	7 July 2021 – 8 September 2022	Independent
	Minister of Justice and Keeper of the Seals	Abderrachid Tabbi	7 July 2021 – present	Independent
	Minister of Finance	Ayman Benabderrahmane	7 July 2021 – 8 September 2022	Independent
	Minister of Energy and Mines	Mohamed Arkab	7 July 2021 – present	Independent
	Minister of Energy Transition and Renewable Energy	Ben Attou Ziane	7 July 2021 – 16 March 2023	FM
	Minister of Mojahedin	Laid Rebiga	7 July 2021 – present	Independent
	Minister of Religious Affairs and Waqf	Youcef Belmehdi	7 July 2021 – present	Independent
	Minister of National Education	Abdelhakim Belabed	7 July 2021 – present	Independent
	Minister of Higher Education and Scientific Research	Abdelbaki Benziane	7 July 2021 – 8 September 2022	Independent
	Minister of Professional Education and Training	Yacine Merabi	7 July 2021 – present	Binaa
	Ministry of Culture and Arts	Wafaa Chaalal	7 July 2021 – 8 September 2022	RND
	Minister of Youth and Sports	Abderezak Sebgag	7 July 2021 – 16 March 2023	RND
	Minister of Digitization and Statistics	Hocine Cherhabil	7 July 2021 – 16 March 2023	Independent
	Minister of Post and Communication Technology and Information	Karim Bibi Triki	7 July 2021 – present	Independent
	Minister of National Solidarity, Family and the Status of Women	Kaoutar Krikou	7 July 2021 – present	Independent
	Minister of Industry	Ahmed Zeghdar	7 July 2021 – 16 March 2023	FLN
	Minister of Agriculture and Rural Development	Abdelhamid Hamdane	7 July 2021 – 8 September 2022	Independent
	Minister of Housing and Urban Development	Mohamed Tarek Belaribi	7 July 2021 – present	Independent
	Minister of Trade and Export Promotion	Kamel Rezig	7 July 2021 – present	Independent
	Minister of Communications and Government Spokesperson	Ammar Belhimer	7 July 2021 – present	Independent
	Minister of Public Works	Kamel Nasri	7 July 2021 – 8 September 2022	Independent
	Minister of Transport	Aissa Bekkai	7 July 2021 – 16 March 2023	Independent
	Minister of Water Resources and Water Security	Karim Hasni	7 July 2021 – 16 March 2023	Independent
	Minister of Tourism and Handicrafts	Yacine Hammadi	7 July 2021 – 16 March 2023	Independent
	Minister of Health, Population and Hospital Reform	Abderrahmane Benbouzid	7 July 2021 – 8 September 2022	Independent
	Minister of Labour, Employment and Social Security	Abderrahmane Lahfaya	7 July 2021 – 8 September 2022	Independent
	Minister of Relations with Parliament	Bessma Azouar	7 July 2021 – present	FM
	Minister of Environment	Samia Moualfi	7 July 2021 – 16 March 2023	FLN
	Minister of Fisheries and Fishery Productions	Hichem Sofiane Salaouatchi	7 July 2021 – 16 March 2023	FLN
	Minister of Pharmaceutical Industry	Abderrahmane Lotfi Djamel Benbahmad	7 July 2021 – 16 March 2023	Independent

=== Deputy Ministers (Deleguate Ministers) ===
Portrait	Portfolio	Attached	Name	Term	Party
	Minister of Microbusiness	Prime Minister	Nassim Diafat	7 July 2021 – 7 April 2023	Independent
	Minister of the Knowledge Economy and Start-ups	Prime Minister	Yacine El-Mahdi Oualid	7 July 2021 – present	Independent

=== Secretary General ===
Portrait	Attached	Name	Term	Party
	Prime Minister	Yahia Boukhari	7 July 2021 – present	Independent
