= Cabinet of Algeria =

Council of Ministers of the People's Democratic Republic of Algeria
- مجلس وزراء الجمهورية الجزائرية الديمقراطية الشعبية

Overview
- Established: 1958 Provisional Government of Algeria
- State: Algeria
- Leader: Prime Minister
- Appointed by: President of the Republic
- Responsible to: People's National Assembly
- Headquarters: El Mouradia Palace, Algiers
- Website: www.premier-ministre.gov.dz

The Council of Ministers is an Algerian government body established by the Algerian Constitution to discuss and adopt some of the main acts of executive power, such as the tabling of government bills or the appointment of senior officials. It is chaired by the President of the Republic and brings together the Prime Minister, all full-service ministers and, depending on the government, all or some of the lower-ranking ministers. Only a very summary report of the meetings being published, it is also supposed to allow the ministers to freely discuss the policy of the Government. It traditionally meets at El Mouradia Palace, the official residence of the President, although it can be summoned anywhere and at any time by the President.

The Council is one of the elements allowing the President of the Republic to direct the executive power despite the great role theoretically assigned to the Prime Minister by the Constitution. It enables it to control the development and implementation of Government policy and to give or refuse its agreement to a certain number of important decisions, and, more generally, to mark its views on discussions involving the whole of the Government.

The Council of Ministers is the only formal meeting of all members of the executive branch of the Government. The President may also chair restricted councils comprising certain ministers.

== Role ==
=== Juridical competence ===
The Constitution, laws and regulations provide that a number of government decisions must be referred to the Council of Ministers to be valid.

Government bills (the only ones called "bills", private members' bills simply being called "private bills") must be introduced in Council before being introduced in Parliament.

Certain regulatory acts must also be presented to the Council of Ministers before being adopted. These acts are the ordinances, taken in the field of the law by virtue of a temporary authorization, and a certain number of decrees, which are then called "decrees in the Council of Ministers", and concern:

Unlike other regulatory acts which are only signed by the Prime Minister and the ministers responsible for their execution, these acts must also be signed by the President of the Republic and give the President a right of veto over these texts.

A decree in the Council of Ministers, even if no text provided for its inclusion on the agenda, can only be amended by another decree in the Council of Ministers, unless its final provisions or a legislative provision only allows it is modified by simple decree.

In addition, the Prime Minister must consult the Council before committing the responsibility of his Government on his program or a declaration of general policy.

== Composition and presidency ==
The Council of Ministers brings together the President of the Republic, the Prime Minister, full-service ministers and, sometimes, lower-ranking ministers (delegate minister and secretaries of state) or some of them.

The Council is chaired by the President of the Republic. He can "exceptionally" be replaced by the Prime Minister, "by virtue of an express delegation and for a specific agenda". This procedure is extremely rare.

The Secretary General of the Presidency of the Republic and the Secretary General of the Government, who prepare the reports of the meetings, also attend the Council, without taking part in it.

== Functioning ==
=== Convocation ===
It is up to the President of the Republic, who chairs the Council, to determine the date and place of its meetings.

The Palace of El Mouradia, the official residence of the President of the Republic, is the normal meeting place of the Council. The Council meets on the ground floor. Ministers are seated in the order of protocol determined by the decree of appointment.

The President of the Republic can however convene the Council elsewhere, for symbolic reasons.

=== Preparation ===
For the meeting, the Secretary General of the Government sends a draft agenda to the President of the Republic, the Prime Minister and the ministers. The agenda is set during a meeting between the president and the secretary general, and sent to ministers.

Before the meeting, the President, the Prime Minister, the Secretary General of the Presidency and the Secretary General of the Government have a brief meeting. During this time, the director of the cabinet of the Secretary General of the Government prepares the final version of the press release and has the ministers sign the acts which will be presented to the President during the Council.

=== Process ===
Meetings follow a strict agenda that leaves little room for improvisation. The President of the Republic can, on certain particularly important or controversial questions, lead a tour de table so that the ministers express their opinion; he is always the last to speak.

Discussions in the Council of Ministers are supposed to remain confidential. The press release issued after the Council contains only brief and evasive indications.

== Other boards and meetings ==
Other councils bringing together members of the Government exist in parallel with the Council of Ministers and supplement it in a restricted field or with a reduced number of participants, the restricted meetings are called "councils" when they are chaired by the President of the Republic. and “committees” when they are chaired by the Prime Minister.

=== Restricted Councils ===
Restricted Councils can be held at El Mouradia Palace with the President of the Republic, the Prime Minister, several ministers and senior officials. Although their operation shares many features with the Council of Ministers, they are less solemn and more concrete and are meant to be working meetings.

=== Interministerial committees ===
Small government meetings, called interministerial committees, may be held without the presence of the President. They are chaired by the Prime Minister or by a minister appointed to replace him, and bring together certain ministers concerned by a particular problem, and sometimes senior officials.

== 2020 Cabinet ==
The government of President Tebboune was made up of 39 members after he took office in January 2020. The following table includes those appointees by Tebboune and other Algerian government offices appointed in previous administrations:

Portrait	Incumbent	Office	Website	Government of
	Sifi Ghrieb	Prime Minister	www.premier-ministre.gov.dz	Tebboune
	Abdelmadjid Tebboune	President, Minister of Defence	www.mdn.dz/site_principal/accueil_an.php	Tebboune
	Saïd Sayoud	Minister of Interior, Local Authorities and Transport	www.interieur.gov.dz	Tebboune
	Ahmed Attaf	Minister of Foreign Affairs	www.mae.gov.dz/default_en.aspx	Tebboune
	Abderrachid Tabbi	Minister of Justice and Keeper of the Seals	www.mjustice.dz	Tebboune
	Abdelkrim Bouzred	Minister of Finance	www.mf.gov.dz	Tebboune
	Mohamed Arkab	Minister of Energy and Mines	www.energy.gov.dz	Tebboune
	Laid Rebiga	Minister of War Veterans (Moudjahidine) and Rights Holders	www.m-moudjahidine.dz	Tebboune
	Youcef Belmehdi	Minister of Religious Affairs and Endowments (Wakfs)	www.marw.dz	Tebboune
	Abdelhakim Belabed	Minister of National Education	www.m-education.gov.dz	Tebboune
	Kamel Bidari	Minister of Higher Education and Scientific Research	www.mesrs.dz/accueil	Tebboune
	Yacine Merabi	Minister of Vocational Education and Training Professionals	www.mfep.gov.dz	Tebboune
	Soraya Mouloudji	Ministry of Culture and Arts	www.m-culture.gov.dz	Tebboune
	Abderrahmane Hammad	Minister of Youth and Sports	www.mjs.gov.dz	Tebboune
	Meriem Benmiloud	Minister of Digitization and Statistics	www.mns.gov.dz	Tebboune
	Karim Bibi Triki	Minister of Post and Telecommunications	www.mpt.gov.dz/en	Tebboune
	Kaoutar Krikou	Minister of National Solidarity, Family and Women's Affairs	www.msnfcf.gov.dz	Tebboune
	Youcef Chorfa	Minister of Agriculture and Rural Development	madr.gov.dz	Tebboune
	Mohamed Tarek Belaribi	Minister of Housing, Urban Planning and the City	www.mhuv.gov.dz/Pages/IndexFr.aspx	Tebboune
	Tayeb Zitouni	Minister of Trade and Export Promotion	www.commerce.gov.dz//	Tebboune
	Mohamed Meziane	Minister of Communication	www.ministerecommunication.gov.dz	Tebboune
	Lakhdar Rakhroukh	Minister of Public Works and Basic Infrastructures	www.mtpib.gov.dz	Tebboune
	Taha Derbal	Minister of Irrigation	www.mh.gov.dz	Tebboune
	Mokhtar Didouche	Minister of Tourism and Craftsmanship	www.mtatf.gov.dz	Tebboune
	Abdelhak Saihi	Minister of Health, Population and Hospital Reform	www.sante.gov.dz	Tebboune
	Fayçal Bentaleb	Minister of Labor, Employment and Social Security	www.mtess.gov.dz	Tebboune
	Basma Azouar	Minister of Relations with Parliament	www.mcrp.gov.dz	Tebboune
	Fazia Dahleb	Minister of Environment and Renewable Energy	www.meer.gov.dz/a/	Tebboune
	Ahmed Bidani	Minister of Fishing and Fishery Productions	www.mpeche.gov.dz	Tebboune
	Ali Aoun	Minister of Industry and Pharmaceutical Production	www.miph.gov.dz	Tebboune
	Yacine Oualid	Minister of Knowledge Economy, Start-ups and Micro-enterprises		Tebboune
	Yahia Boukhari	Secretary General of the government		Tebboune
