= Foued Chehat =

Algerian politician

Deputy Minister for Sahara Agriculture and Mountains
- Incumbent
- Assumed office 2 January 2020
- President: Abdelmadjid Tebboune
- Prime Minister: Abdelaziz Djerad; Aymen Benabderrahmane; Nadir Larbaoui

Fouhed Chehat is the Algerian Deputy Minister for Sahara Agriculture and Mountains. He was appointed as minister on 2 January 2020.
