= Mohamed Bouslimani =

Algerian politician

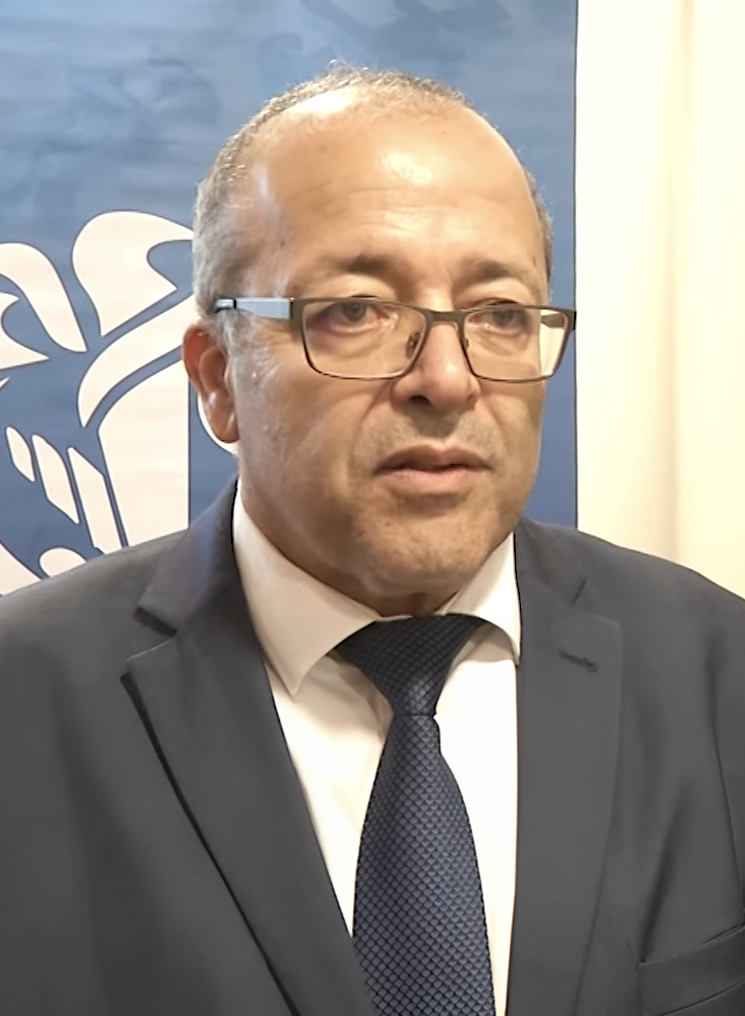

Minister of Communications
- In office 11 November 2021 – 20 June 2023
- President: Abdelmadjid Tebboune
- Prime Minister: Aymen Benabderrahmane; Nadir Larbaoui
- Preceded by: Ammar Belhimer

Personal details
- Born: 25 November 1956 (age 69) Algiers, French Algeria

Mohamed Bouslimani (born 25 November 1956) is the Algerian Minister of Communications. He was appointed as minister on 13 November 2021.

== Education ==
Bouslimani holds a Bachelor of Political and Information Sciences.
