= Rachid Bladehane =

Algerian politician

Secretary of State for National Community and Experts Abroad
- In office 2 January 2020 – 24 June 2020
- President: Abdelmadjid Tebboune
- Prime Minister: Abdelaziz Djerad
- Succeeded by: Samir Chaabna

Algerian Ambassador to the United Nations in Geneva
- Incumbent
- Assumed office 3 December 2021
- Prime Minister: Aymen Benabderrahmane; Nadir Larbaoui
- Preceded by: Toufik Dahmani

Personal details
- Born: 28 July 1957 (age 69) Ouled Hamla, Oum El Bouaghi Province, French Algeria
- Education: École nationale d'administration (PhD)

Rachid Bladehane (born 28 July 1957) is an Algerian politician. He was the Algerian Secretary of State for National Community and Experts Abroad from his appointment on 2 January 2020 until June 2020, when he was succeeded by Samir Chaabna.

== Education ==
Bladehane holds a PhD from the École nationale d'administration.

Diplomatic posts
Preceded by Toufik Dahmani	Algerian Ambassador to the United Nations in Geneva; 2024–present	Incumbent
