= Bachir Messaitfa =

Algerian politician

Deputy Minister of Statistics and Forward Planning
- Incumbent
- Assumed office 2 January 2020
- President: Abdelmadjid Tebboune
- Prime Minister: Abdelaziz Djerad; Aymen Benabderrahmane; Nadir Larbaoui

Bachir Messaitfa is the Algerian Deputy Minister of Statistics and Forward Planning. He was appointed as deputy minister on 2 January 2020.
