= Aïssa Bekkai =

Algerian politician

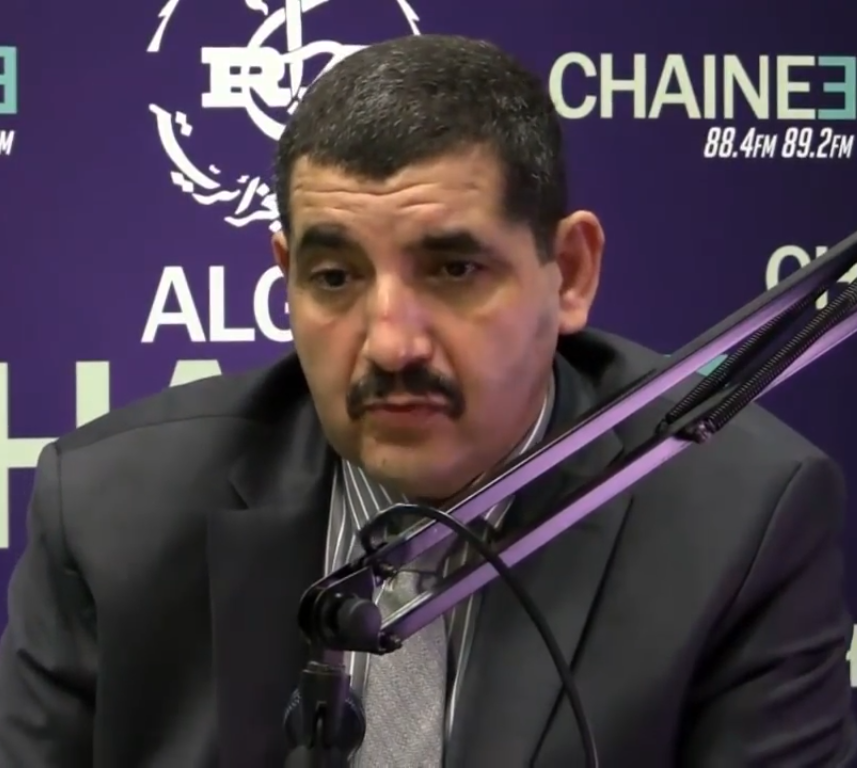
- Bekkai in 2020

Deputy Minister for Foreign Trade
- Incumbent
- Assumed office 2 January 2020
- President: Abdelmadjid Tebboune
- Prime Minister: Abdelaziz Djerad; Aymen Benabderrahmane; Nadir Larbaoui
- Preceded by: Said Djellab

Personal details
- Born: 14 August 1964 (age 61)

Aïssa Bekkai (born 14 August 1964) is the Algerian Deputy Minister for Foreign Trade. He was appointed as minister on 2 January 2020.
