= Hamza Al Sid Cheikh =

Algerian politician

Deputy Minister for Saharan Environment
- In office 2 January 2020 – 21 February 2021
- President: Abdelmadjid Tebboune
- Prime Minister: Abdelaziz Djerad; Aymen Benabderrahmane; Nadir Larbaoui

Personal details
- Born: 16 April 1983 (age 43)

Hamza Al Sid Cheikh (born 16 April 1983) is an Algerian politician. Previously he had served as Deputy Minister for Saharan environment from 2 January 2020 until 21 February 2021.
