= Ammar Belhimer =

Algerian journalist and author

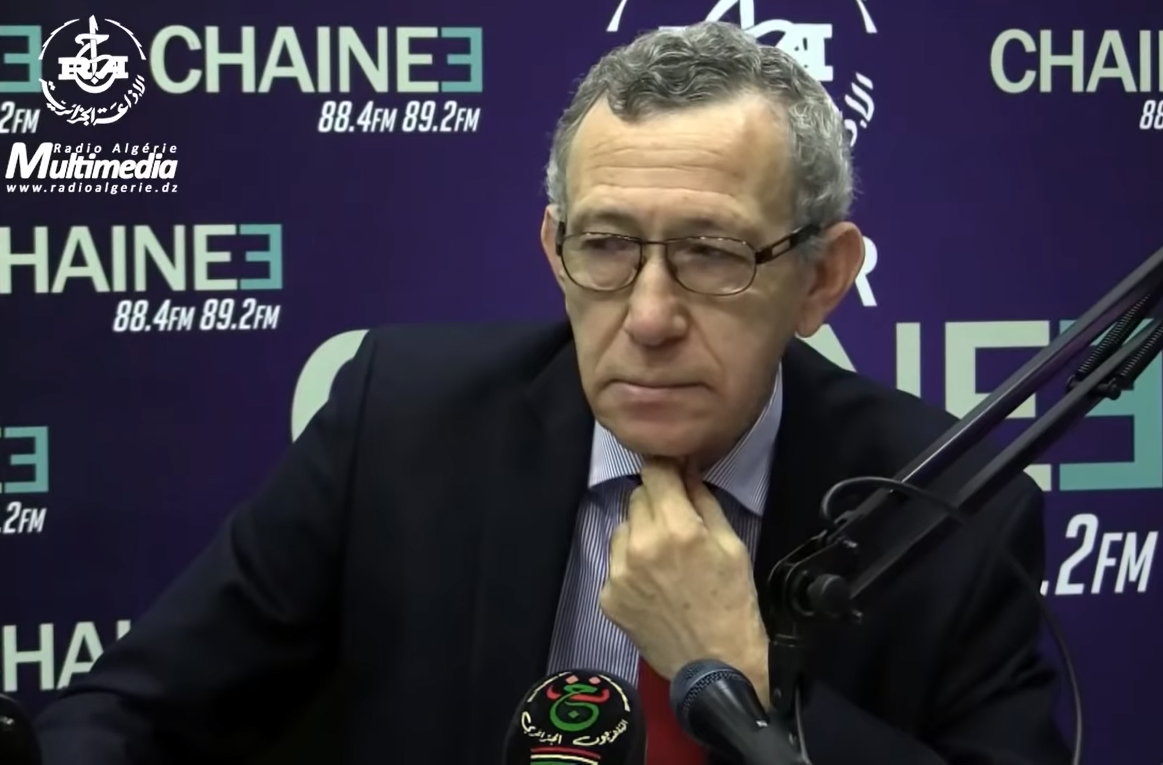

Minister of Communication Government spokesperson
- In office 4 January 2020 – 11 November 2021
- President: Abdelmadjid Tebboune
- Prime Minister: Aymen Benabderrahmane
- Preceded by: Hassan Rabehi
- Succeeded by: Mohamed Bouslimani

Personal details
- Born: May 4, 1955 (age 71) El Aouana, Jijel Province, Algeria
- Party: Independent
- Education: Paris Descartes University
- Occupation: Journalist
- Cabinet: First, second and third Djerad governments Benabderrahmane government

Ammar Belhimer (in Arabic: عمار بلحيمر) (born 4 May 1955 in El Aouana, Jijel Province) is an Algerian public law teacher and journalist, who had served as Minister of Communication and spokesperson in the first Djerad government since 4 January 2020, and then in the first Benabderrahmane government from January 4, 2020 until November 11, 2021.

He is the founder of four newspapers, and has experience as a reporter and columnist.

== Biography ==
After a degree in public law at the University of Algiers in 1978, Ammar Belhimer continued his studies at the Paris Descartes University, where after a DEA obtained in 1984 he became a Doctor of Law in December 1997, with a thesis entitled "Political and legal analysis of Algerian external debt management strategies from 1986 to the present day".

=== Journalism ===
From 1975 to 1990, Belhimer was a journalist with the State daily El Moudjahid and one of the activists of the Movement of Algerian Journalists (1988–1990). In 1980, he was banned from activity for six months by the second Abdelghani government for having written an article reporting the sentencing of an army captain to a prison term for corruption.

After the Hamrouche law of 1990 authorized the creation of a private press, he successively founded several newspapers:

- the weekly La Semaine d'Algérie (April 1991/February 1992);
- In April 1992, he founded the daily newspaper La Nation, of which he was director and editor-in-chief. Its editorial line was to allow a resumption of dialogue between some of the main political movements of the country, the Islamic Salvation Front (FIS), the Socialist Forces Front (FFS) and the National Liberation Front (FLN); the term "terrorism", usually applied to the action of the FIS, is replaced by that of "armed action", reflecting a form of dissent from government policy. At the time of the assassination of Mohamed Boudiaf in June 1992, the newspaper ran the headline "Une seul piste: la mafia politico-financier" ("One track: The politico-financial mafia"), a headline that was taken up by the international press. La Nation was then subject to a "definitive" ban on publishing, as part of a policy of censorship of the press affecting two other dailies, Le Matin, banned for two months, and Al Djazaïr al Yawn, also banned "definitively". Journalists indicated that La Nation would be allowed to reappear, in exchange for a pledge to support the government, but in October, five of the main editors, including Ammar Belhinder, published a statement in a mainstream daily, in which they indicated their refusal to participate in the newspaper: they had to blindly follow the government's line, whose anti-FIS attacks made it, according to them, complicit with terrorists and went against the proclaimed desire for dialogue and reconciliation. They also denounced the financial pressures resulting from the monopoly on the distribution of advertising by a state agency.

Subsequently, he has been:

- Founder and editor of the daily Demain L'Algérie (1998-2000);
- Director of advertising communication at ANEP, the State body allocating advertising revenues to the press (2000–2002);
- Chairman and Chief Executive Officer of the subsidiary Anep-Communication et Signalétique (2002–2003);
- author of specialized programs in geopolitics and economics on ENTV (1990–1994).

In 2003, he became a columnist for Le Soir d'Algérie. He is a lecturer at the Faculty of Law of Algiers, and director of the Algerian Journal of Legal, Economic and Political Sciences.

He campaigns at conferences for greater freedom of the press, and denounces the "democratic deficit" and corruption, factors opposing any effectiveness of Algeria's economic reforms.

=== Academic ===
Ammar Belhimer is a professor at the Faculty of Law of the University of Algiers and qualified to direct research. He is the author of several books and articles.

=== Minister of Communication ===
On 2 January 2020, Belhimer was appointed Minister of Communication and spokesperson in the Djerad government. His appointment provoked a feeling of incomprehension and questioning on the part of Saïd Kaced, one of his former journalist colleagues.

On 13 January, he praised the Hirak Movement, heralding "the rupture with the totalitarian system, which continues" and considered that "it is to preserve the nation that the Hirak has taken to the streets and that without it, the country would perhaps have collapsed at this time", which was why "its protection must constitute a national mission". Regarding the press, he announced reforms, including constitutional ones "focused on the independence and freedom of the press within the framework of respect for privacy, ethics, deontology and the rejection of insult and defamation" and said he believed that "freeing journalistic practice from all forms of censorship and monopoly will guarantee the conditions conducive to a free and responsible exercise of the journalistic profession".

On 19 February, he reiterated his praise of the Hirak Movement. He announced as future measures a stricter framework for Algerian television and news websites, and concerning the freedom of the press, pled for "a system of responsibility that frames the exercise of this freedom" by focusing on respect for the "right to the image of others, the honor and privacy of people". He indicated that he did not envisage any financial measure to support the written press, in serious crisis: "the press support fund is no longer funded since 2015".

On 16 March, he changed his discourse and affirmed, with regard to the Hirak Movement, that "NGOs based in Geneva or London, irreducible residues of the ex-FIS and the mafia revanchists of the old system are working hard [...] to spread the slogans of civil disobedience, unrest and the use of violence".

In April, he justified, as a precaution and pending a judicial decision, the suspension of two electronic media, "Maghreb émergent" and "Radio M", declaring: "Its director is a journalist who has practiced defamation, slander, and insult, against the person of Head of state", while recalling that, concerning journalists imprisoned in Algeria, it is not his role as Minister of Communication to interfere in judicial cases for which it is appropriate to await "the results of the investigations and the final decision of the court to know the content of the case". The previous day, he had justified the decision by claiming Radio M received foreign funding, an accusation described as defamatory by the publisher of both sites.

In August 2020, Belhimer's ministry reacted to the conviction of journalist Khaled Drareni for "undermining national unity" and "inciting an unarmed gathering" after his coverage of Hirak Movement protests, stating that Drareni did not apply for an Algerian press pass or for accreditation to be a correspondent for foreign media, all of which, according to the ministry, would never be tolerated by the countries of the media concerned. (Note: In the case of Khaled Drareni, correspondent of TV5Monde, the country concerned is France, where no government accreditation is required to be a correspondent, and where the press pass is optional. Since 2017, there is no longer an organization issuing the press pass in Algeria.)

In September 2020, he told the Arabic-language newspaper El-Lika, concerning Drareni's three-year prison sentence, that "There are no prisoners of conscience in Algeria".

The resumption of the Hirak demonstrations in the spring of 2021 led to the following reaction from Belhimer on 13 April 2021: "It is no secret that some external parties are instrumentalizing this pseudo Hirak, called the new Hirak, in their war against Algeria". He also said that these parties "resort to unhealthy means, including attempting to deceive public opinion and falsify the facts, but these methods have been laid bare". Belhimer did not state what he meant more precisely.

In office since January 2020 in the communication chair, on 11 November 2021 Ammar Belhimer gave way to Mohamed Bouslimani.

== Publications ==
=== Books ===
- La dette extérieure de l’Algérie : une analyse critique des politiques d’emprunts et d’ajustement (Algeria's External Debt: A Critical Analysis of Borrowing and Adjustment Policies), Casbah Éditions, 1998 (in French)
- Une histoire de la pensée économique (A History of Economic Thought), Éditions Juris-Com, 2007 (in Arabic)
