= Bachir Youcef Sehairi =

Algerian politician

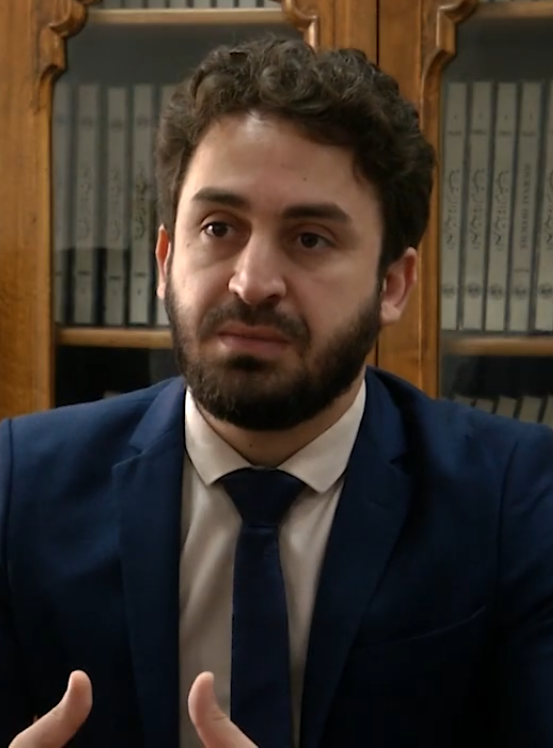
- Sehairi in 2020

Secretary of State for Film Industry
- In office 2 January 2020 – 21 February 2021
- President: Abdelmadjid Tebboune
- Prime Minister: Abdelaziz Djerad; Aymen Benabderrahmane; Nadir Larbaoui

Personal details
- Born: 21 June 1985 (age 41)

Bachir Youcef Sehairi (born 21 June 1985) was the Algerian Secretary of State for Film Industry between 2 January 2020 and 21 February 2021.
