= Mohamed Cherif Belmihoub =

Algerian politician

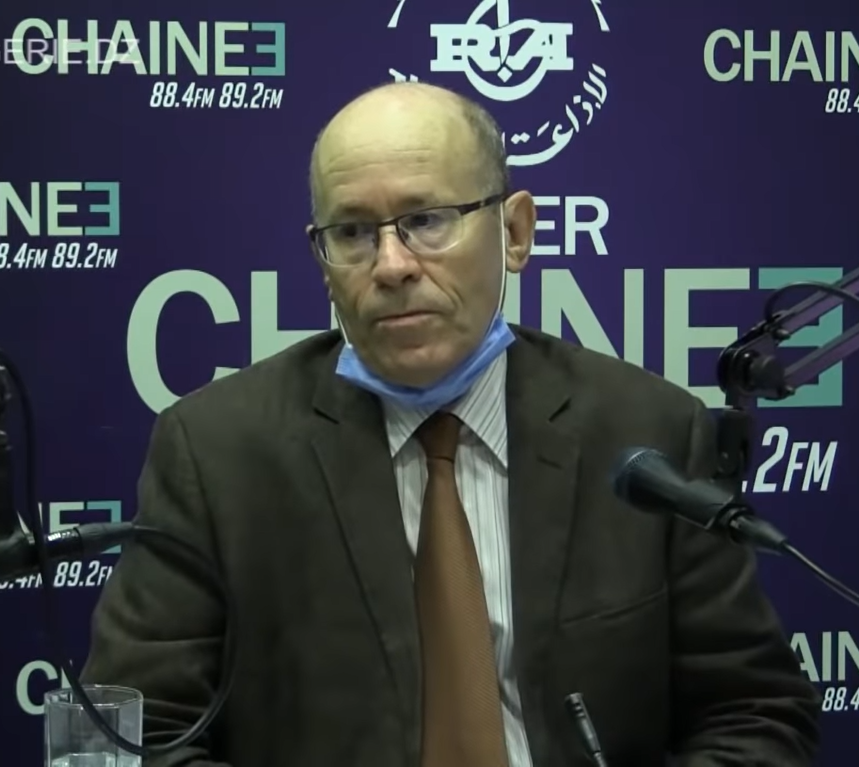
- Belmihoub in 2020

Minister Delegate of the Prime Minister in charge of Foresight
- In office June 2020 – February 2021
- Monarch: Abdelmadjid Tebboune
- Prime Minister: Abdelaziz Djerad

Personal details
- Born: 23 September 1956 (age 70)
- Education: Paris-Sorbonne University (PhD)

Mohamed Cherif Belmihoub (born 23 September 1956) is an Algerian politician and economist. He is the former Minister Delegate of the Prime Minister in charge of Foresight.

== Education ==
Belmihoub studied economics at the University of Algiers, CNAM Paris and holds a PhD from Paris-Sorbonne University.

== Career ==
From 1998 until 2018, Belmihoub was a professor of management at ENA. During that time he also taught at the University of Montpellier.

From 2010 until 2014, he additionally served as director of the École Nationale Supérieure de Management.

In 2020, he was teaching at Algiers University.

From June 2020 until February 2021, Belmihoub served as Minister Delegate of the Prime Minister in charge of Foresight.
