= Yahia Boukhari =

Algerian politician

Secretary General of the government
- Incumbent
- Assumed office 2 January 2020
- President: Abdelmadjid Tebboune
- Prime Minister: Sabri Boukadoum; Abdelaziz Djerad; Aymen Benabderrahmane; Nadir Larbaoui

Personal details
- Born: 15 June 1953 (age 72)

Yahia Boukhari (born 15 June 1953) is the Algerian Secretary General of the government. He was appointed as Secretary on 2 January 2020.
