= Basma Azouar =

Algerian politician

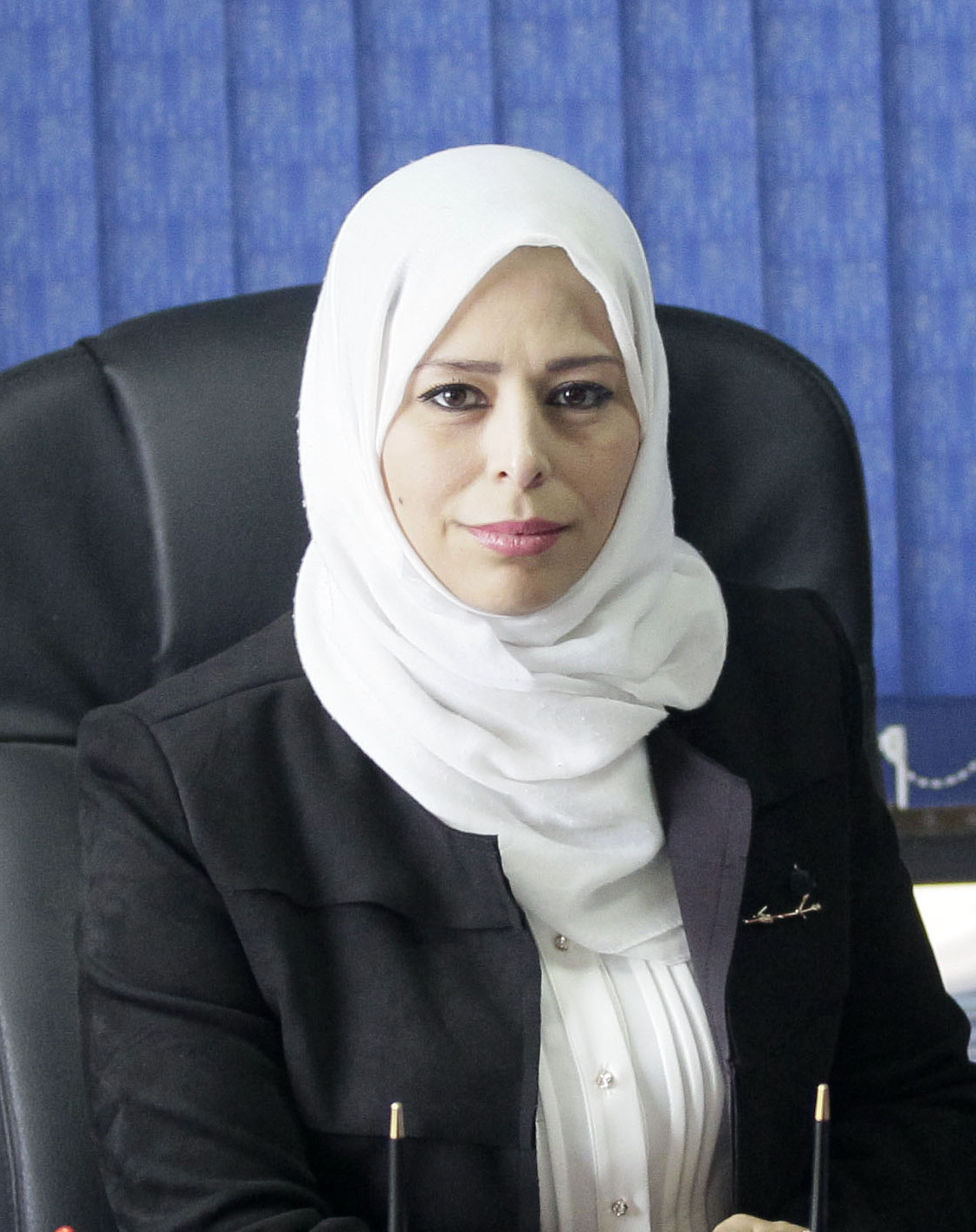
- Basma Azouar in 2018

Minister of Relations with Parliament
- Incumbent
- Assumed office 7 July 2021
- President: Abdelmadjid Tebboune
- Prime Minister: Aymen Benabderrahmane; Nadir Larbaoui

Personal details
- Born: March 16, 1983 (age 43)

Basma Azouar (born 16 March 1983) is the Algerian Minister of Relations with Parliament. She was appointed as minister on 7 July 2021.

== Education ==
Azouar holds a Bachelor in Legal and Administrative Sciences, a Diploma of Advanced Studies and a Master in Human Rights.
