= Ben Attou Ziane =

Algerian politician

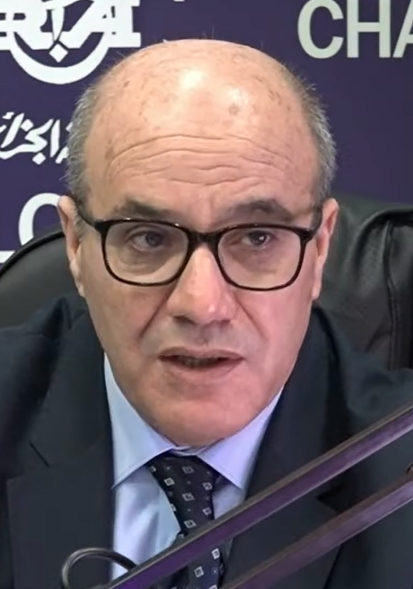

Minister of Energy Transition and Renewable Energy
- Incumbent
- Assumed office 7th July 2021
- Preceded by: Chems-Eddine Chitour

Personal details
- Political party: Future Front

Ben Attou Ziane (Arabic: بن عتو زيان) is an Algerian politician from the Future Front. He has been Minister of Energy Transition and Renewable Energy in the Benabderrahmane government since 7 July 2021.
