= Tamazight =

Tamazight may refer to:

- Berber languages, family of North African languages
  - Blidean Atlas Tamazight, Berber language of northern Algeria
  - Central Atlas Tamazight, Berber language of central Morocco
  - Standard Moroccan Tamazight, standardized Berber language of Morocco
  - Standard Algerian Tamazight, standardized Berber language of Algeria
  - Temacine Tamazight, Berber language of northeastern Algeria
  - Tidikelt Tamazight, Berber language of central Algeria
  - Tmazight (Tarifit), Berber language of northern Morocco
- Tamazight TV, Moroccan public television channel
