= Bakhti Belaïb =

Algerian politician

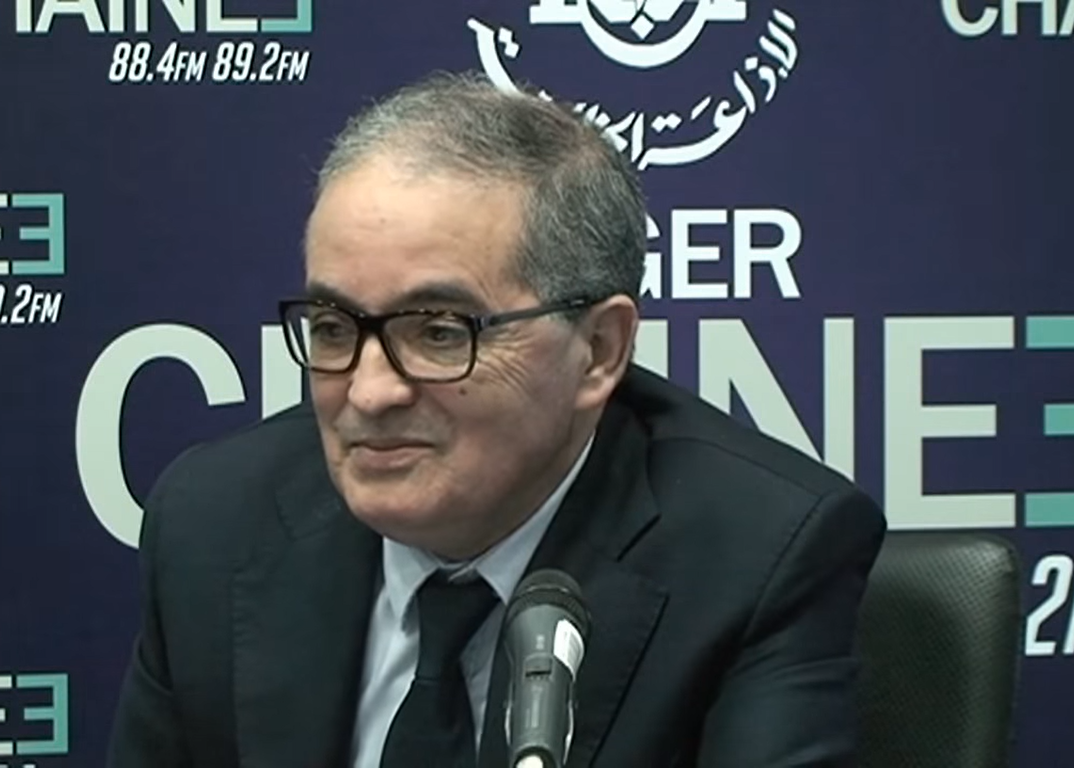
- Born: August 22, 1953; Theniet El-Had, Tissemsilt, Algeria
- Died: January 26, 2017; Paris, France
- Burial place: Cemetery at Cheraga, Algiers

Bakhti Belaïb (Arabic: بختي بلعايب) (August 22, 1953 – January 26, 2017) was an Algerian politician. He was born in Théniet El Had and educated at the Lycée Ferroukhi in Miliana. He served as the Algerian Ministry of Trade in 1982, and served as its Minister twice. He died of cancer in Paris, France.
