= Nassim Diafat =

Algerian politician

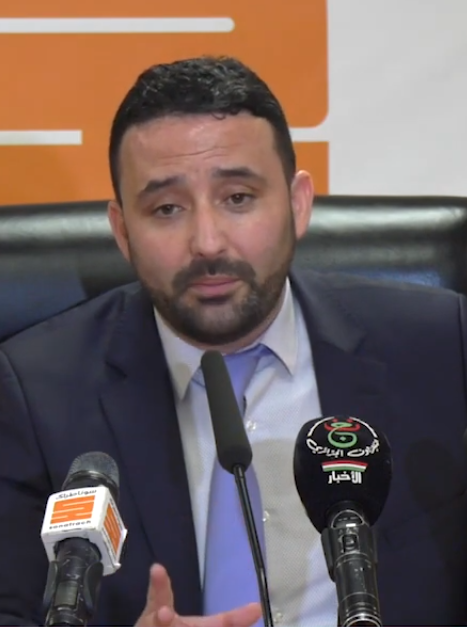
- Diafat in 2021

Deputy Minister for Incubators
- In office 2 January 2020 – 8 September 2022
- President: Abdelmadjid Tebboune
- Prime Minister: Abdelaziz Djerad; Aymen Benabderrahmane
- Succeeded by: Yacine El-Mahdi Oualid

Personal details
- Born: 24 July 1983 (age 43)

Nassim Diafat (born 24 July 1983) is an Algerian politician. Previously he had served as Deputy Minister for Incubators from 2 January 2020 until 8 September 2022. He was remanded in custody on April 7, 2023 for a corruption case.

== Education ==
Diafat has a Diploma in French language.

== Career ==
Diafat was the founder and director of Numedia Telecom and a founding member of the National Federation of Young Entrepreneurs.

In January 2020, he was appointed Deputy Minister for incubators. On 8 September 2022 he was let go from the government.
