= Youcef Belmehdi =

Algerian politician

- يوسف بلمهدي
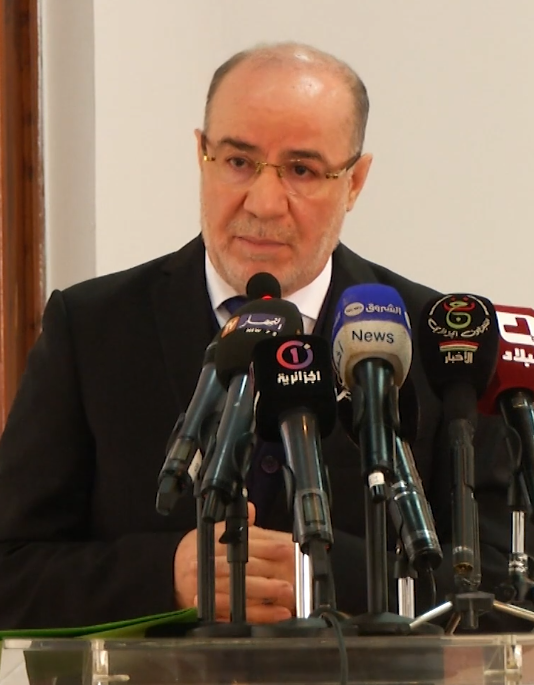
- Belmehdi in 2021

Minister of Religious Affairs and Endowments
- Incumbent
- Assumed office 30 June 2021
- President: Abdelmadjid Tebboune
- Prime Minister: Aymen Benabderrahmane; Nadir Larbaoui
- Preceded by: Mohamed Aïssa

Personal details
- Born: 29 September 1963 (age 62)
- Education: Emir Abdelkader University (GDip, Mag); Algiers 1 University (PhD)

Youcef Belmehdi (born 29 September 1963) is the Algerian Minister of Religious Affairs and Endowments. He was appointed as minister on 30 June 2021.

== Education ==
Belmehdi holds a Diploma in Islamic Sciences (1988), a Magister in Islamic Jurisprudence (1997) from the Emir Abdelkader University and a Doctorate in Islamic Jurisprudence (2007) from the Algiers 1 University.
