= Yacine Oualid =

Algerian politician

- ياسين وليد
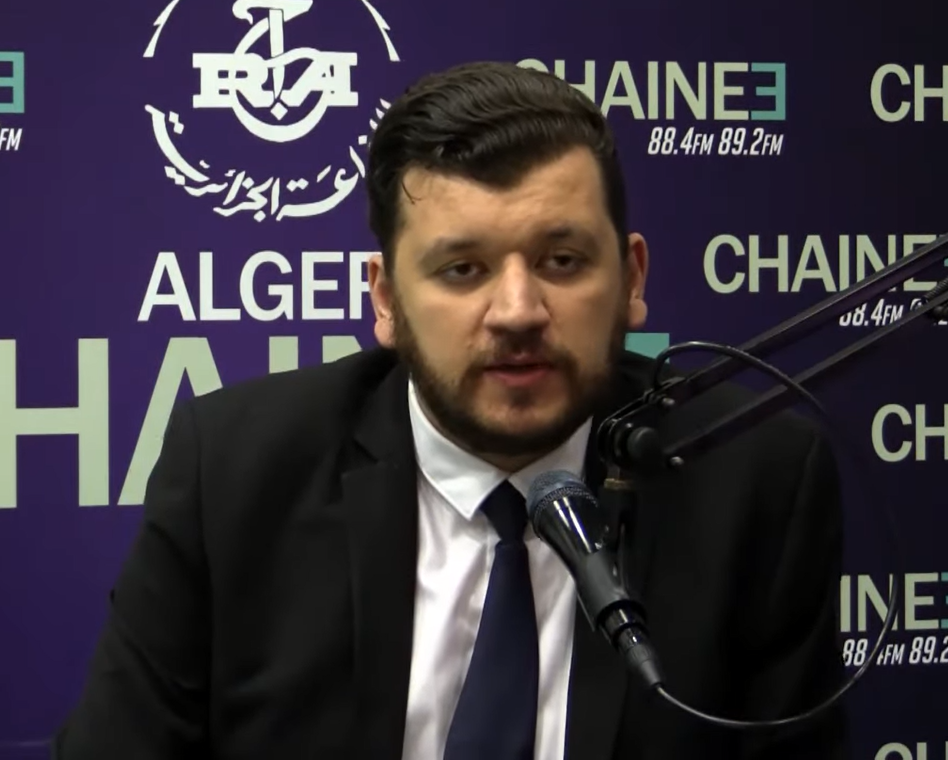
- Oualid in 2020

Minister of Agriculture and rural development
- Incumbent
- Assumed office 19 November 2024
- Prime Minister: Abdelaziz Djerad, Aymen Benabderrahmane; Nadir Larbaoui
- Preceded by: Nassim Diafat

Personal details
- Born: June 12, 1993 (age 33)
- Education: Sidi Bel Abbès University (MD)

Yacine El-Mahdi Oualid (born 12 June 1993) he is the Algerian Minister of Agriculture and rural development.

== Education ==
Oualid holds a Doctor of Medicine (2018) from the Sidi Bel Abbès University.

== Career ==
Oualid founded the company Smart Solutions Hosting in 2016.

In 2019, Oualid co-founded the startups Smart Ways and Bright Solutions.

Oualid was appointed Minister Delegate to the Prime Minister in charge of Knowledge Economy, Start-ups and Micro-enterprises in 2020.

Since 9 September 2022, Oualid has been Minister of Knowledge Economy, Start-ups and Micro-enterprises.

As of November 19, 2024, Yacine Oualid has been appointed as Minister of Vocational Training and Education.
