= Kaoutar Krikou =

Algerian politician

- كوثر كريكو
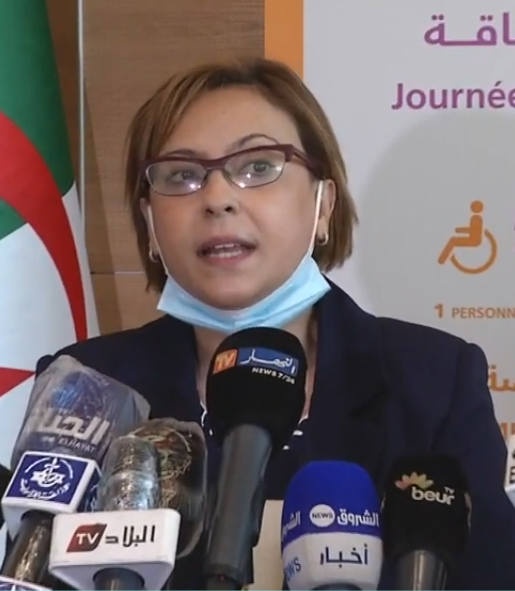
- Krikou in 2020

Minister of National Solidarity, Family and Women’s Affairs
- Incumbent
- Assumed office 4 January 2020
- President: Abdelmadjid Tebboune
- Prime Minister: Aymen Benabderrahmane; Nadir Larbaoui
- Preceded by: Ghania Eddalia

Personal details
- Born: 2 March 1982 (age 44)

Kaoutar Krikou (Arabic: كوثر كريكو; born 2 March 1982) is the Algerian Minister of National Solidarity, Family and Women's Affairs. She was appointed as minister on 4 January 2020.

== Education ==
Krikou holds a Master in Business Law.
