= Chems-Eddine Chitour =

Algerian politician and academic (1944–2026)

- شمس الدين شيتور
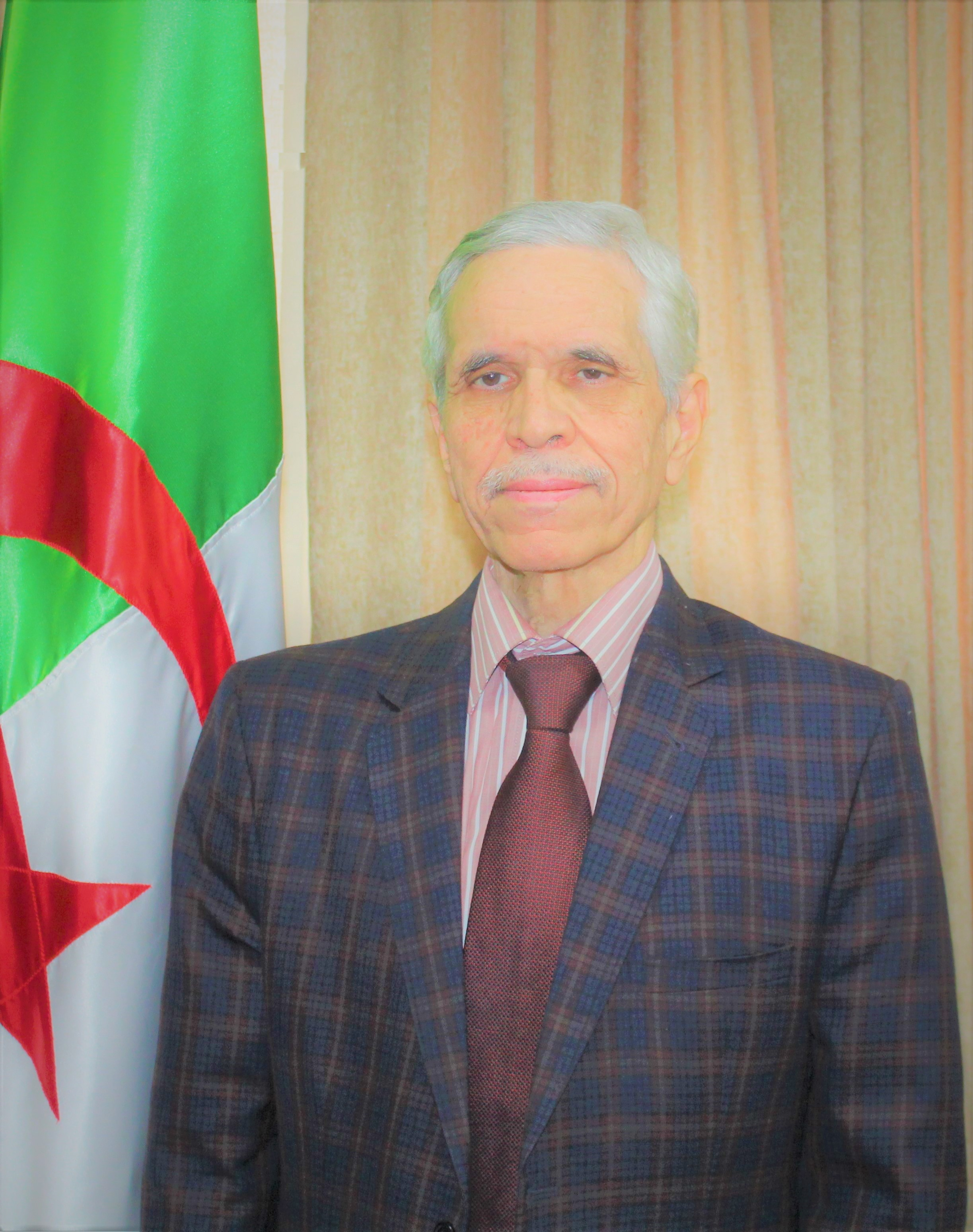

Minister of Energy Transition and Renewable Energies
- In office 23 June 2020 – 8 July 2021

Minister of Higher Education and Scientific Research
- In office 4 January 2020 – 24 June 2020

Personal details
- Born: 13 October 1944 Bordj Bou Arréridj, French Algeria
- Died: 19 April 2026 (aged 81)
- Education: Jean Monnet University (D. Sc.)

Chems-Eddine Chitour (Arabic: شمس الدين شيتور; 13 October 1944 – 19 April 2026) was an Algerian scholar, researcher, author and politician.

== Life and career ==
Chitour graduated from the National Polytechnic School and the Algerian Institute of petroleum in Algiers, in the field of Chemistry. He did his doctorate "Es Sciences" at the Université Jean Monnet in France. He is the founder of valorization of fossil energy research laboratory. He worked as a professor and assisting professor at "IGC" and then ENSIACET in the city of Toulouse in France. He published several scholarly articles and books.

He took office on 4 January 2020 as Minister of Higher Education and Scientific Research.

Chitour died on 19 April 2026, at the age of 81.
