= Sabri Boukadoum =

Algerian politician

- صبري بوقادوم
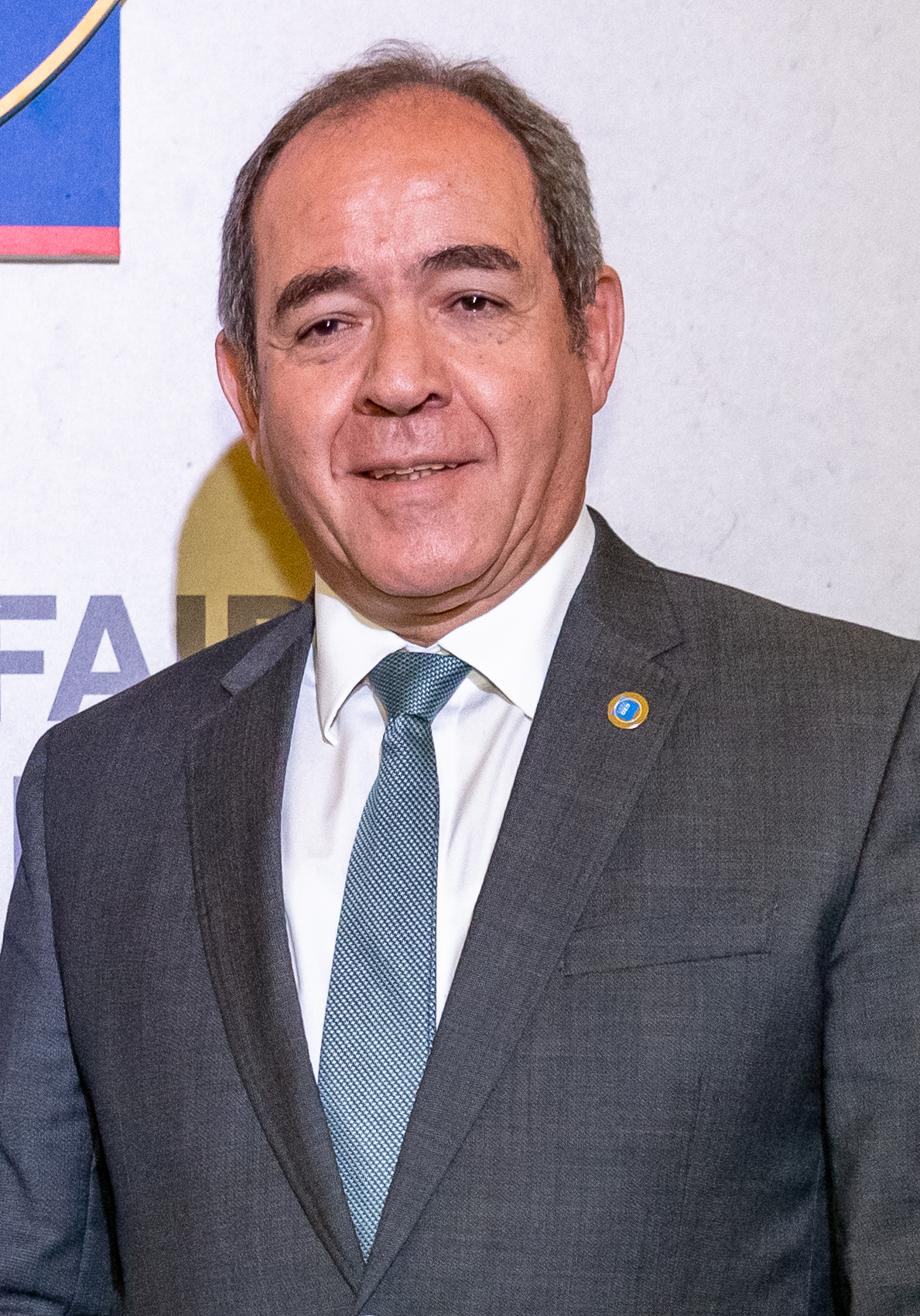

Prime Minister of Algeria
- Acting
- In office 19 December 2019 – 28 December 2019
- President: Abdelmadjid Tebboune
- Preceded by: Noureddine Bedoui
- Succeeded by: Abdelaziz Djerad

Minister of Foreign Affairs
- In office 31 March 2019 – 7 July 2021
- Prime Minister: Noureddine Bedoui; Abdelaziz Djerad
- Preceded by: Ramtane Lamamra
- Succeeded by: Ramtane Lamamra

Personal details
- Born: 1 September 1958 (age 67) Constantine, Algeria
- Profession: Diplomat, politician

Sabri Boukadoum (Arabic: صبري بوقادوم, romanized: Ṣabrī Buqādum; born 1 September 1958) is an Algerian diplomat who has served as Minister of Foreign Affairs since 31 March 2019. He briefly served as acting Prime Minister of Algeria from 19 to 28 December 2019. He was a member of the Algerian government diplomatic team since 2013.

== Early life and education ==
Boukadoum was born on 1 September 1958 in Constantine, Algeria. He graduated from the École nationale d'administration — Diplomatic Section.

== Career ==
Between 1987 and 1988, Boukadoum was First Secretary at the Algerian embassy in Budapest. From 1988 until 1992, he worked as Counsellor at the United Nations in New York. From 1993 until 1996, he was the Director for Political Affairs, the United Nations and Disarmament.

From November 1996 until September 2001, Boukadoum served as ambassador to Ivory Coast. From November 2001 until October 2005, he was Chief of Protocol of the Ministry of Foreign Affairs. From October 2005 until August 2009, he served as ambassador to Portugal. From 2009 until 2013, Boukadoum was the Director General for the Americas in the Ministry of Foreign Affairs. In December 2013, he was appointed Permanent Representative of Algeria to the United Nations. In June 2016, Boukadoum was elected Chair of the United Nations General Assembly First Committee.

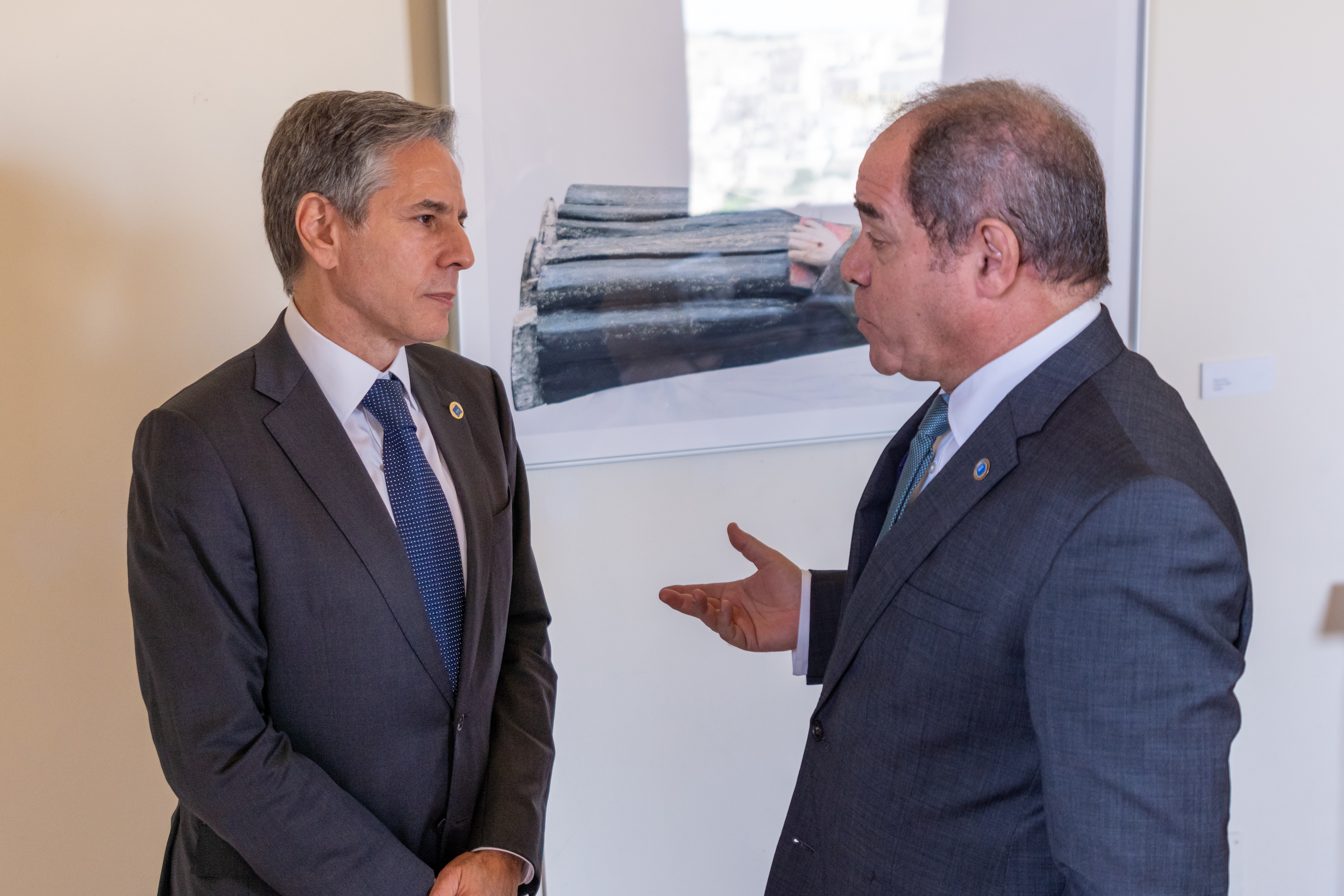
Boukadoum meets U.S. Secretary of State Antony J. Blinken in Bari, Italy on June 29, 2021.

From 19 December 2019 until 28 December 2019, he was the Algerian Prime Minister and replaced by Abdelaziz Djerad. On 2 January 2020, President Abdelmadjid Tebboune appointed Sabri Boukadoum as new Minister of Foreign Affairs.

In January 2020, Boukadoum chaired the Ministerial Session of the Peace and Security Council of the African Union. The meeting planned to ensure peace and to discuss the organization of the presidential election in December 2021 in Libya.

In May 2021, he chaired the African Union Peace and Security Council meeting in Algiers on the situation of COVID-19 and access to vaccines.

== Personal life ==
Boukadoum is a polyglot. Besides speaking Arabic, he is fluent in English, French, Portuguese and Spanish. He is married and has two children.

Political offices
Preceded by Noureddine Bedoui	Prime Minister of Algeria; Acting; 2019	Succeeded by Abdelaziz Djerad
