= Ministry of Culture and Arts (Algeria) =

Government ministry of Algeria

- Ministère de la Culture et des Arts وزارة الثقافة والفنون

Ministry overview
- Formed: 1982
- Jurisdiction: Government of Algeria
- Headquarters: Kouba, Algiers
- Minister responsible: Soraya Mouloudji
- Website: www.m-culture.gov.dz

Ministry of Culture and Arts (Algeria)

Standard Arabic
- Abjad: وزارة الثقافة والفنون

Tamazight
- Tifinagh: ⴰⵖⵍⵉⴼ ⵏ ⵢⵉⴷⵍⴻⵙ ⴷ ⵜⵥⵓⵔⵉⵡⵉⵏ
- Latin: Aɣlif n Yidles d Tẓuriwin
- Abjad: ؤغليف ن ييذلس ذ ثزوريوين

French
- French: Ministère de la Culture et des Arts

The Ministry of Culture and Arts (Arabic: وزارة الثقافة والفنون, French: Ministère de la Culture et des Arts) is the Algerian government ministry which oversees the protection and enhancement of Algeria's cultural heritage. Its head office is in Kouba, Algiers Province.
