= Prime Minister of Algeria =

Head of government

First Minister of the People's Democratic Republic of Algeria
- الوزير الأول للجمهورية الجزائرية الديمقراطية الشعبية
- Emblem of Algeria

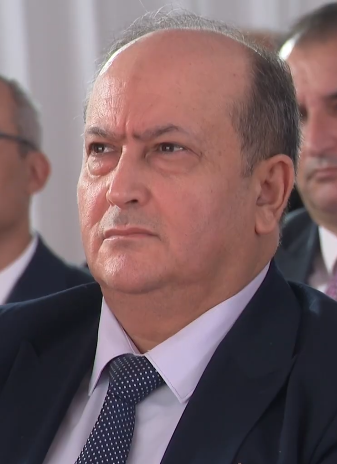
- Incumbent; Sifi Ghrieb since 14 September 2025 (Note: Acting (28 August 2025 – 14 September 2025))
- Government of Algeria
- Style: Mr Prime Minister (informal); His Excellency (diplomatic)
- Status: Head of government
- Reports to: President
- Residence: Government Palace
- Seat: Algiers, Algeria
- Appointer: President of Algeria
- Term length: No term limit
- Constituting instrument: Constitution of Algeria
- Inaugural holder: Ahmed Ben Bella
- Formation: 27 September 1962
- Salary: د.ج 500,000/US$ 2,358 monthly
- Website: www.premier-ministre.gov.dz

The prime minister of Algeria, officially the First Minister of the People's Democratic Republic of Algeria (Arabic: الوزير الأول للجمهورية الجزائرية الديمقراطية الشعبية), is the head of government of Algeria. The prime minister is appointed by the president of Algeria, along with other ministers and members of the government that the new prime minister recommends. The People's National Assembly must approve the legislative program of the new government or the Assembly is dissolved and the prime minister must resign.

There are no constitutional limits on a prime minister's term. The longest-serving prime minister was Mohamed Ben Ahmed Abdelghani, who served under President Chadli Bendjedid from 8 March 1979 until 22 January 1984. He served as the first prime minister since 1963, when the position was abolished.

Sifi Ghrieb has been the prime minister since 14 September 2025.

== Role and Constitution ==
The title of the prime minister has evolved as follows since the independence of 1962:

- Head of Government: September 27, 1962 - September 15, 1963
- Prime Minister: March 8, 1979 - November 5, 1988
- Head of Government: November 5, 1988 - November 12, 2008
- Prime Minister: November 12, 2008 - December 30, 2020
- Prime Minister or Head of Government: since December 30, 2020

The Constituent Assembly of 1962 decided to designate a Head of Government, President of the Council until the adoption of the Constitution. The Constitution of 1963 does not include the position of prime minister.

In the 1976 Constitution, the position is optional and was not assigned under the presidency of Houari Boumédiène. Starting from the constitutional revision of 1988, the position was simply referred to as Head of Government.

During the constitutional revision of 2008, there was again mention of a prime minister appointed by the president of the Republic.

Finally, the constitutional revision of 2020 provides for the designation of a Head of Government in case of a parliamentary majority opposed to the president of the Republic, or a prime minister in case of a presidential majority.

== Tenure ==
The Prime Minister or Head of Government is appointed by the President of the Republic like any other member of the government. They are first appointed to the cabinet and then propose individuals for vacant government positions.

If the outgoing government has not resigned, the new prime minister is not tasked with forming a new government.

The National People's Assembly must approve the Prime Minister's general policy statement, or they may be dismissed from their position.

There is no constitutional limit to the duration of a Prime Minister's term. Mohamed Abdelghani served nearly five consecutive years from 1979 to 1984.

However, since 2005, Ahmed Ouyahia holds the record for the longest tenure, serving ten years as prime minister from 1995 to 1998, 2003 to 2006, 2008 to 2012, and from 2017 to 2019. He is also the only individual to have held the position more than once.

== See also ==
- Politics of Algeria
- President of Algeria
