= Abdelaziz Djerad =

Prime Minister of Algeria from 2019 to 2021

- عبد العزيز جراد
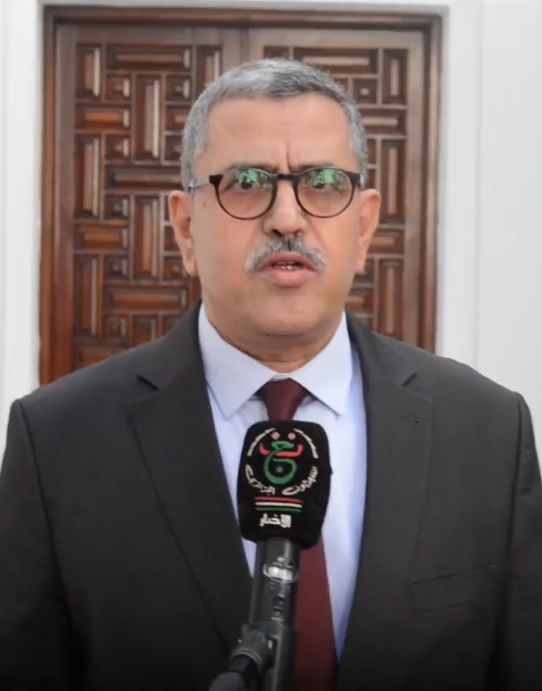
- Djerad in 2019

18th Prime Minister of Algeria
- In office 28 December 2019 – 30 June 2021
- President: Abdelmadjid Tebboune
- Preceded by: Sabri Boukadoum (Acting)
- Succeeded by: Aymen Benabderrahmane

Personal details
- Born: 12 February 1954 (age 72) Khenchela, French Algeria
- Party: Independent
- Education: University of Algiers; Paris Nanterre University
- Profession: Professor; Politician

Abdelaziz Djerad (Arabic: عبد العزيز جراد; born 12 February 1954) is an Algerian politician and diplomat who served as Prime Minister of Algeria from 28 December 2019 to 30 June 2021. In September 2021, he was appointed ambassador to Sweden.

== Early life ==
Djerad was born in Khenchela on 12 February 1954. After completing a bachelor's degree at the Institute of Political Sciences and International Relations of Algiers in 1976, he moved to Paris Nanterre University where he obtained his doctorate. He also worked as a professor of political science at the University of Algiers and published several books.

Between 1989 and 1992, Djerad was the director of the national school of administration (ENA) of Algiers.

== Political career ==
=== 1990s ===
From 1996 until 2000, Abdelaziz Djerad was the Director General of the Algerian Agency for International Cooperation.

Djerad served under the heads of Ali Kafi, Liamine Zéroual, and Abdelaziz Bouteflika. However, in 2003, under Bouteflika, he was sidelined and has since become an outspoken critic of the former president.

=== Premiership (2019–2021) ===
On 28 December 2019, Djerad was appointed Prime Minister of Algeria by President Abdelmadjid Tebboune and was immediately tasked with forming a new government.

On 29 December 2019, he appointed Brahim Bouzeboudjen as Director of Cabinet and Mohamed Lamine Saoudi Mabrouk as the Head of Prime Minister's Office.

A government was named on 2 January 2020.

On 13 January 2020, Abdelaziz Djerad was asked by president Tebboune to prepare a law criminalizing all forms of racism, regionalism and hate speech. In October 2020, president Tebboune tested positive for COVID-19 and flew to Germany for treatment. Meanwhile, Djerad assumed his tasks. On 29 December 2020, president Tebboune resumed his duties.

Djerad resigned on 24 June 2021 after the 2021 Algerian parliamentary election. He was succeeded by Aymen Benabderrahmane, Minister of Finance since June 2020.

=== After premiership (2021–present) ===
On 5 September 2021, Djerad was appointed ambassador to Sweden by President Tebboune.

Government offices
Preceded by Sabri Boukadoum; Acting	Prime Minister of Algeria; 2019–2021	Succeeded by Aymen Benabderrahmane
