= Nadir Larbaoui =

Prime Minister of Algeria from 2023 to 2025

- نذير العرباوي
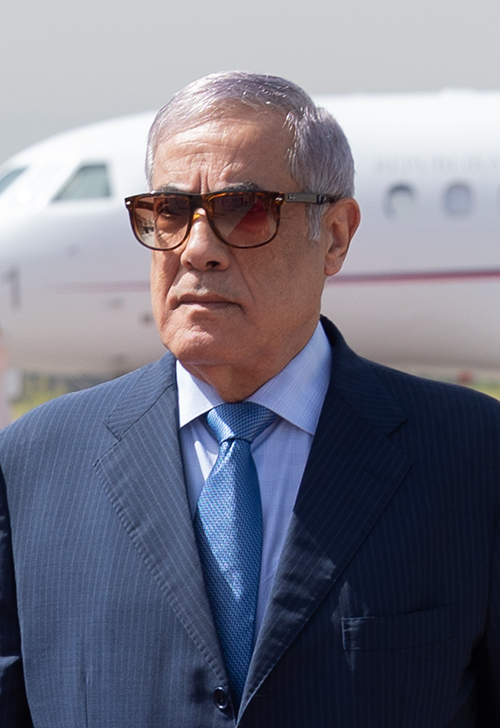
- Larbaoui in 2024

20th Prime Minister of Algeria
- In office 11 November 2023 – 28 August 2025
- President: Abdelmadjid Tebboune
- Preceded by: Aymen Benabderrahmane
- Succeeded by: Sifi Ghrieb

Director of Cabinet of Presidency of the Republic
- In office 16 March 2023 – 11 November 2023
- President: Abdelmadjid Tebboune
- Preceded by: Abdelaziz Khellef
- Succeeded by: Boualem Boualem

Algerian Ambassador to the United Nations
- In office September 2021 – 16 March 2023
- President: Abdelmadjid Tebboune
- Preceded by: Sofiane Mimouni
- Succeeded by: Amar Bendjama

Algerian Ambassador to Egypt
- In office 29 February 2012 – 15 October 2019

Personal details
- Born: 26 September 1949 (age 76) Tébessa, French Algeria
- Party: Independent
- Profession: Politician; diplomat; lawyer

Nadir Larbaoui (Arabic: نذير العرباوي, romanized: Nadīr al-ʻArbāwī; born 26 September 1949) is an Algerian politician, lawyer and diplomat, who served as the Prime Minister of Algeria from 2023 to 2025.

== Early life ==
Larbaoui was born on 26 September 1949 in Tébessa, Algeria (during the French Rule). In his youth, he was an athlete on Algeria men's national handball team. He participated in the Algerian Men's Handball Cup and won the 1971–1972, 1972–1973 and 1975–1976 Algerian Cups. He was selected during the World Handball Championship in 1974 then during the African Handball Championship in 1976.

== Career ==
After retiring from handball, he enrolled in University of Algiers Faculty of Law and earned a master's degree in public and private international law and a bachelor's degree in law, making him a lawyer. He went on to work for the Ministry of Foreign Affairs, serving as Director of the Legal and Consular Affairs Division, Director of the International Economic Relations Division and Director for the Arab Maghreb Division. He later became a career diplomat, serving as an ambassador to the United Nations, Pakistan, Arab League, Arab Magreb Union and Egypt.

Larbaoui became chief of staff of President of Algeria Abdelmadjid Tebboune in March 2023.

President Tebboune appointed Larbaoui as prime minister on 11 November 2023, replacing Aymen Benabderrahmane, who had been fired. Several observers characterized this as a desire by Tebboune to further centralize decision-making almost a year ahead of the presidential election scheduled for December 2024. Tebboune dismissed Larbaoui from the position of Prime Minister on 28 August 2025, and Sifi Ghrieb was installed as acting prime minister to replace him.

== Private life ==
He is married and has two children.

Government offices
Preceded by Aymen Benabderrahmane	Prime Minister of Algeria; 2023–2025	Succeeded by Sifi Ghrieb
