= Abdelmadjid Tebboune =

President of Algeria since 2019

His Excellency Abdelmadjid Tebboune GMNOM
- عبد المجيد تبون ⵄⴱⴷⵍⵎⴰⴵⵉⴷ ⵜⴱⴱⵓⵏ
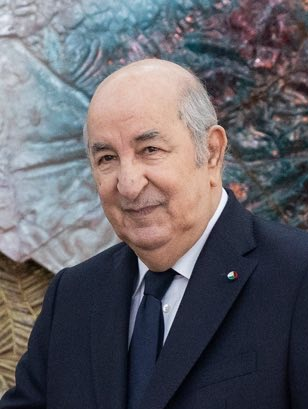
- Tebboune in 2024

8th President of Algeria
- Incumbent
- Assumed office 19 December 2019
- Prime Minister: Sabri Boukadoum (acting); Abdelaziz Djerad; Aymen Benabderrahmane; Nadir Larbaoui; Sifi Ghrieb
- Preceded by: Abdelkader Bensalah (acting); Abdelaziz Bouteflika

Minister of Defence
- Incumbent
- Assumed office 19 December 2019
- Preceded by: Ahmed Gaid Salah (Acting); Abdelaziz Bouteflika (de jure)

16th Prime Minister of Algeria
- In office 25 May 2017 – 15 August 2017
- President: Abdelaziz Bouteflika
- Preceded by: Abdelmalek Sellal
- Succeeded by: Ahmed Ouyahia
Additional offices
Minister of Commerce
Interim
In office 19 January 2017 – 15 August 2017
President	Abdelaziz Bouteflika
Preceded by	Bakhti Belaïb
Succeeded by	Ahmed Saci
Minister of Housing and Urban Development and the City
In office 3 September 2012 – 25 May 2017
President	Abdelaziz Bouteflika
Prime Minister	Abdelmalek Sellal
Preceded by	Noureddine Moussa
Succeeded by	Youcef Cherfa
Minister of Housing and Urban Development
In office 31 May 2001 – 4 June 2002
President	Abdelaziz Bouteflika
Prime Minister	Ali Benflis
Preceded by	Abdellah Bounekraf
Succeeded by	Mohamed Nadir Hamimid
Minister Delegate for Local Communities
In office 26 June 2000 – 31 May 2001
President	Abdelaziz Bouteflika
Prime Minister	Ali Benflis
Preceded by	Noureddine Kasdali
Succeeded by	Dahou Ould Kablia
Minister of Communication and Culture
In office 23 December 1999 – 26 June 2000
President	Abdelaziz Bouteflika
Prime Minister	Ahmed Benbitour
Preceded by	Abdelaziz Rahabi
Succeeded by	Mahieddine Amimour
Minister Delegate for Local Communities
In office 18 June 1991 – 22 February 1992
President	Chadli Bendjedid; Mohamed Boudiaf
Prime Minister	Sid Ahmed Ghozali
Preceded by	Benali Henni
Succeeded by	Ahmed Noui (Secretary of State)
Wali of Tizi Ouzou; (president of the High State Committee)
In office 26 July 1989 – 18 June 1991
Preceded by	Ahmed El Ghazi
Succeeded by	Mostefa Benmansour
Wali of Tiaret
In office 13 May 1984 – 10 July 1989
Preceded by	Mohamed Seghir Hamrouchi
Succeeded by	Rabah Boubertakh
Wali of Adrar
In office 30 January 1983 – 13 May 1984
Preceded by	Abdelkrim Bouderghouma
Succeeded by	Abdelmalek Sellal

Personal details
- Born: 17 November 1945 (age 80) Mécheria, Aïn-Sefra, French Algeria
- Party: National Liberation Front (1991–2019)
- Spouse: Fatima Zohra Bella (m. 1980)
- Children: 5
- Education: National School of Administration

Abdelmadjid Tebboune (Arabic: عَبد الْمَجِيْد تَبُّون, romanized: ʿAbd al-Majīd Tabbūn; Tamazight: ⵄⴱⴷⵍⵎⴰⴵⵉⴷ ⵜⴱⴱⵓⵏ; born 17 November 1945) is an Algerian politician currently serving as President and Minister of National Defense of Algeria since 2019. Since the death of Liamine Zéroual in 2026, Tebboune is the only living Algerian president.

Tebboune was elected in the 2019 Algerian presidential election. Previously, he was Prime Minister of Algeria from May 2017 to August 2017. In addition, he was also minister of housing from 2001 to 2002 for a year and again from 2012 to 2017 for five years.

== Early life and education ==
Abdelmadjid Tebboune was born on 17 November 1945 in Mécheria, in the current Naâma Province, in Algeria, back then Aïn-Sefra territory. He comes from a family from the commune of Boussemghoun, currently in El Bayadh Province, located in the region of the High Plains of southwest Algeria. His father was a sheikh member of the Association of Algerian Muslim Ulema (and Abdelmadjid studied in a school that was controlled by the Association of Ulema in Sidi Bel Abbes before the start of Algerian War between 1953 and 1954) and also a soldier. He graduated from the National School of Administration on 29 July 1969.

== Political career ==
Tebboune was Minister-Delegate for Local Government from 1991 to 1992, during the last months of Chadli Benjedid's presidency. Later, under President Abdelaziz Bouteflika, he served in the government as Minister of Communication and Culture from 1999 to 2000 and then as Minister-Delegate for Local Government from 2000 to 2001. He was the Minister of Housing and Urban Planning from 2001 to 2002. Ten years later, in 2012, he returned to the post of Minister of Housing in the government of Prime Minister Abdelmalek Sellal.

Following the May 2017 parliamentary election, President Bouteflika appointed Tebboune to succeed Sellal as prime minister on 24 May 2017. The appointment of Tebboune surprised Algerian political elites, who had expected Sellal to be reappointed. The new government headed by Tebboune was appointed on 25 May.

Tebboune served as prime minister for less than three months. Bouteflika dismissed him and appointed Ahmed Ouyahia to succeed him on 15 August 2017; Ouyahia took office the next day.

On 12 December 2019, Tebboune was elected president following the 2019 Algerian presidential election, after taking 58% from a turnout of less than 40% the voters, against candidates from both main parties (the National Liberation Front and the Democratic National Rally). On 19 December, he assumed office and received the National Order of Merit from the acting President Abdelkader Bensalah. He was re-elected for a second term in 2024 with an overwhelming majority, securing 84.3% of the votes cast.

== Presidency ==
On the eve of the first anniversary of the Hirak Movement, President Abdelmadjid Tebboune announced in a statement to the Algerian national media that 22 February would be declared the Algerian "National Day of Fraternity and Cohesion Between The People and Its Army For Democracy." In the same statement, Tebboune spoke in favor of the Hirak Movement, saying that "the blessed Hirak has preserved the country from a total collapse" and that he had "made a personal commitment to carry out all of the [movement's] demands." On 21 and 22 February 2020, masses of demonstrators (with turnout comparable to well-established Algerian holidays like the Algerian Day of Independence) gathered to honor the anniversary of the Hirak Movement and the newly established national day.

In an effort to contain the COVID-19 pandemic, Tebboune announced on 17 March 2020 that "marches and rallies, whatever their motives" would be prohibited. After protestors and journalists were arrested for participating in such marches, Tebboune faced accusations of attempting to "silence Algerians." The government's actions were condemned by Amnesty International, which said in a statement that "when all eyes [...] are on the management of the COVID-19 pandemic, the Algerian authorities are devoting time to speeding up the prosecution and trial of activists, journalists, and supporters of the Hirak movement." CNLD estimated that around 70 prisoners of conscience were imprisoned by 2 July 2020 and that several of the imprisoned were arrested for Facebook posts.

On 28 December 2019, the then-recently inaugurated President Tebboune met with Ahmed Benbitour, the former Algerian Head of Government, with whom he discussed the "foundations of the new Republic."

On 8 January 2020, Tebboune established a "commission of experts" composed of 17 members (a majority of which were professors of constitutional law) responsible for examining the previous constitution and making any necessary revisions. Led by Ahmed Laraba, the commission was required to submit its proposals to Tebboune directly within the following two months. In a letter to Laraba on the same day, Tebboune outlined seven axes around which the commission should focus its discussion. These areas of focus included strengthening citizens' rights, combatting corruption, consolidating the balance of powers in the Algerian government, increasing the oversight powers of parliament, promoting the independence of the judiciary, furthering citizens' equality under the law, and constitutionalizing elections. Tebboune's letter also included a call for an "immutable and intangible" two-term limit to anyone serving as president — a major point of contention in the initial Hirak Movement protests, which were spurred by former president Abdelaziz Bouteflika's announced intention to run for a fifth term.

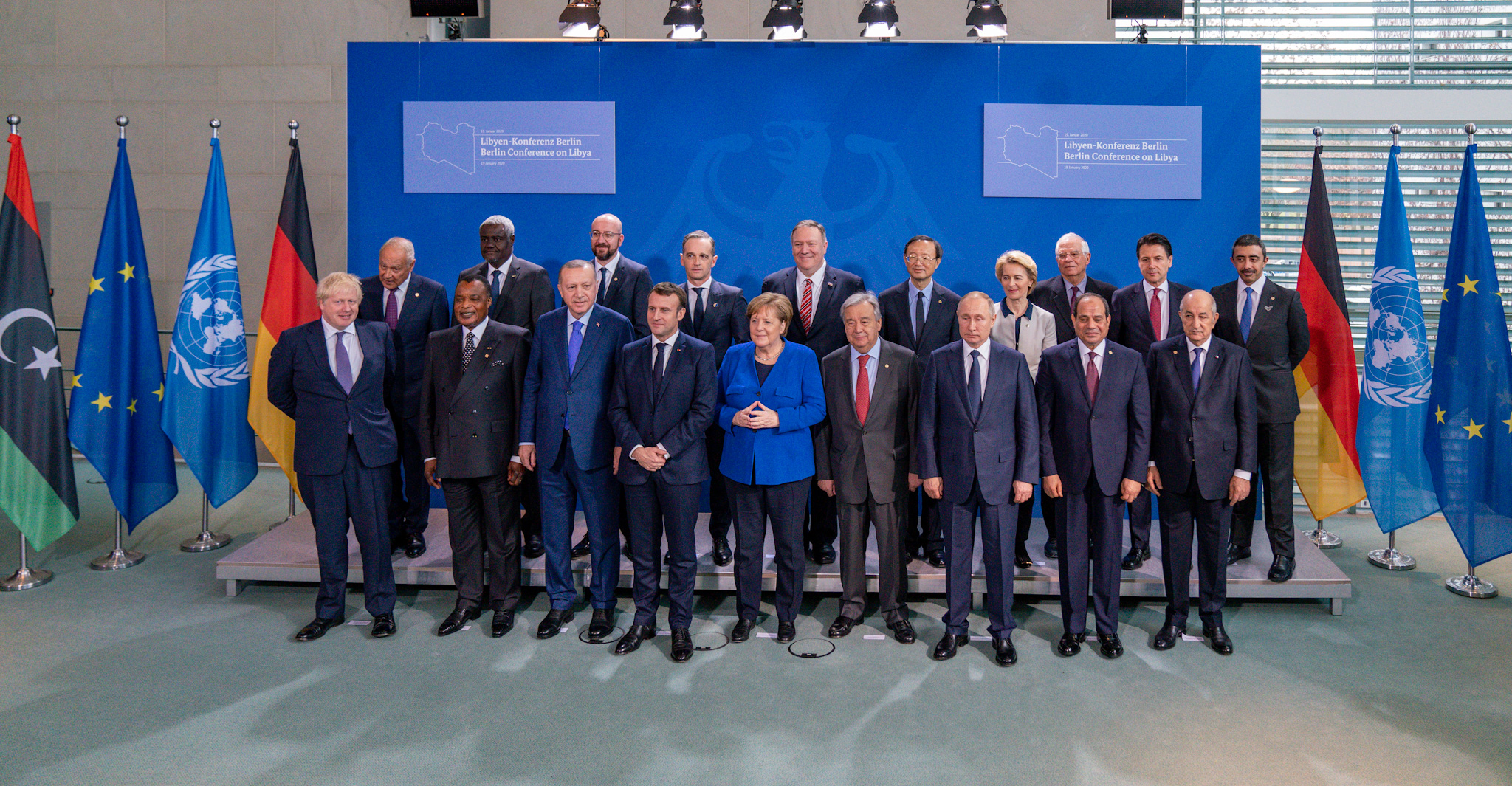
Tebboune at the Libya Summit in Berlin (January 19, 2020)

In January 2020, Tebboune also instructed Prime Minister Djerad to prepare a bill against all forms of racism, regionalism and hate speech based on political convictions, religion, belief or race.

The preliminary draft revision of the constitution was publicly published on 7 May 2020, but the Laraba Commission (as the "commission of experts" came to be known) was open to additional proposals from the public until 20 June. By 3 June, the commission had received an estimated 1,200 additional public proposals. After the Laraba Commission considered all revisions, the draft was introduced to the Cabinet of Algeria (Council of Ministers).

On 4 July 2020, Tebboune announced that the referendum would occur in September or October 2020.

On 24 August 2020, the date for the referendum was set for 1 November, the anniversary of the start of Algeria's war of independence.

The revised constitution was adopted in the Council of Ministers on 6 September, in the People's National Assembly on 10 September, and Council of the Nation on 12 September, but its implementation was contingent on the results of the 1 November referendum.

In October 2020, Tebboune tested positive for COVID-19 and flew to Germany for treatment. Meanwhile, Prime Minister Abdelaziz Djerad assumed his tasks. On 29 December 2020, Tebboune resumed his duties.

The constitutional changes were approved on the 1 November 2020 referendum, with 66.68% of voters participating in favour of the changes.

On 10 January 2021, Tebboune flew back to Germany for treatment of complications in his foot resulting from the COVID-19 infection. On 12 February 2021, he returned to Algeria.

On 16 February 2021 mass protests and a wave of nationwide rallies and peaceful demonstrations against the government of Abdelmadjid Tebboune began. On 18 February 2021, Tebboune announced changes to the cabinet. He dismissed the Minister of Energy, the Minister of Industry, and the Minister of Water Resources, among others. He also dissolved the lower house of the Algerian Parliament and called early legislative elections within six months.

In July 2021, Tebboune formed a new government with Ayman Benabderrahmane as Prime Minister.

On 28 July 2021, Tebboune stated that Algeria offers Libya "total assistance," as he was hosting Mohammad Younes el-Menfi, the president of Libya's Presidency Council. On 8 December 2021, French minister of foreign affairs Jean-Yves Le Drian and Abdelmadjid Tebboune held a meeting. They discussed bilateral relations and peace in Libya and Mali.

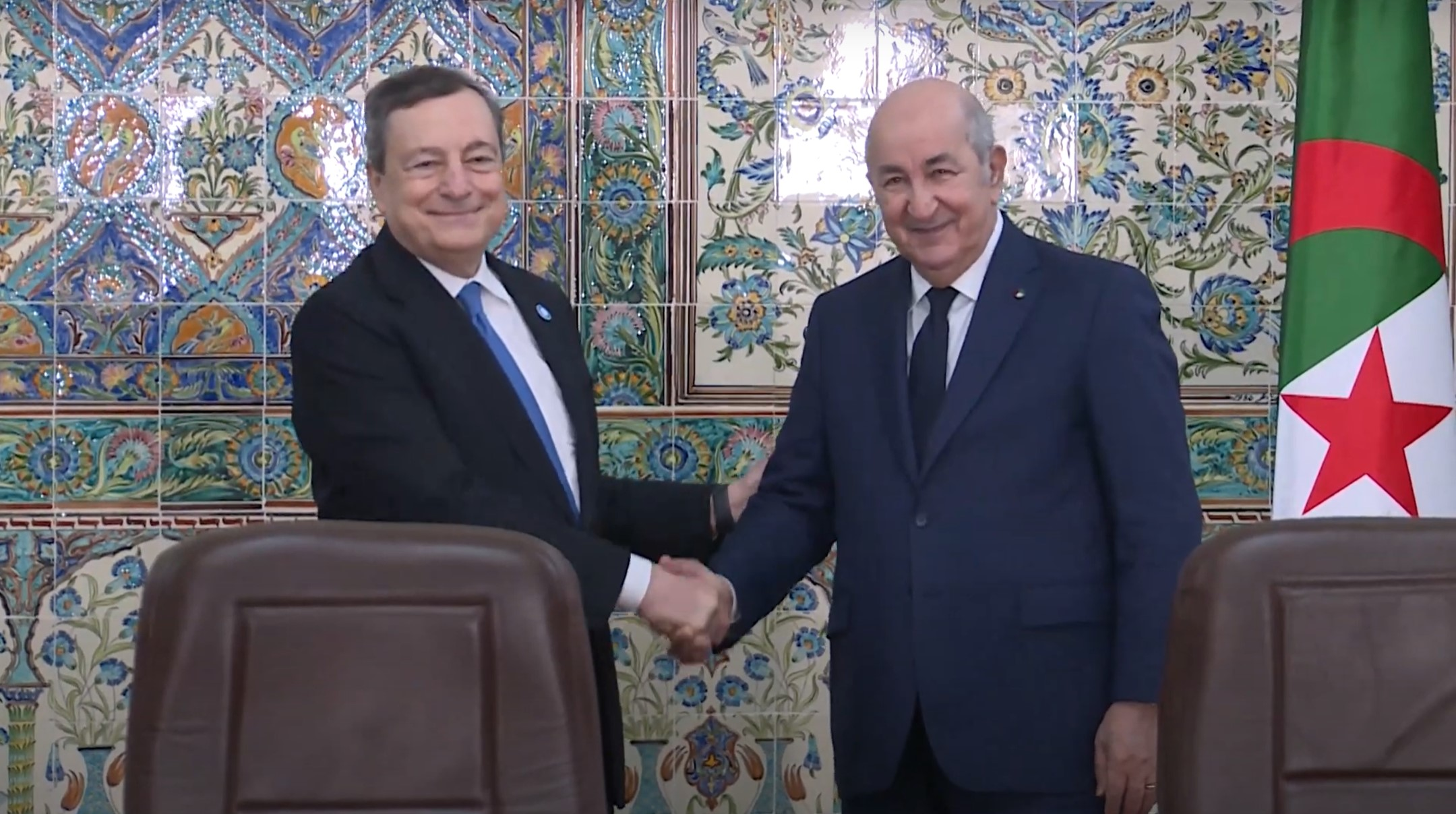
Tebboune with Italian Prime Minister Mario Draghi, 11 April 2022

On 24 January 2022, Tebboune visited Egypt's President Abdel Fattah el-Sisi in Cairo. They discussed bilateral relations, the situation in Libya after the indefinite postponement of elections, the Grand Ethiopian Renaissance Dam, and the potential return of Syria to the Arab League. It was the first official visit of an Algerian president to Cairo since 2008.

On 15 February 2022, Tebboune announced that the government would introduce unemployment benefits for young adults, with the unemployment rate in the country over 15%. The president announced that payments to job hunters aged 19 to 40 will begin in March to preserve "young people's dignity."

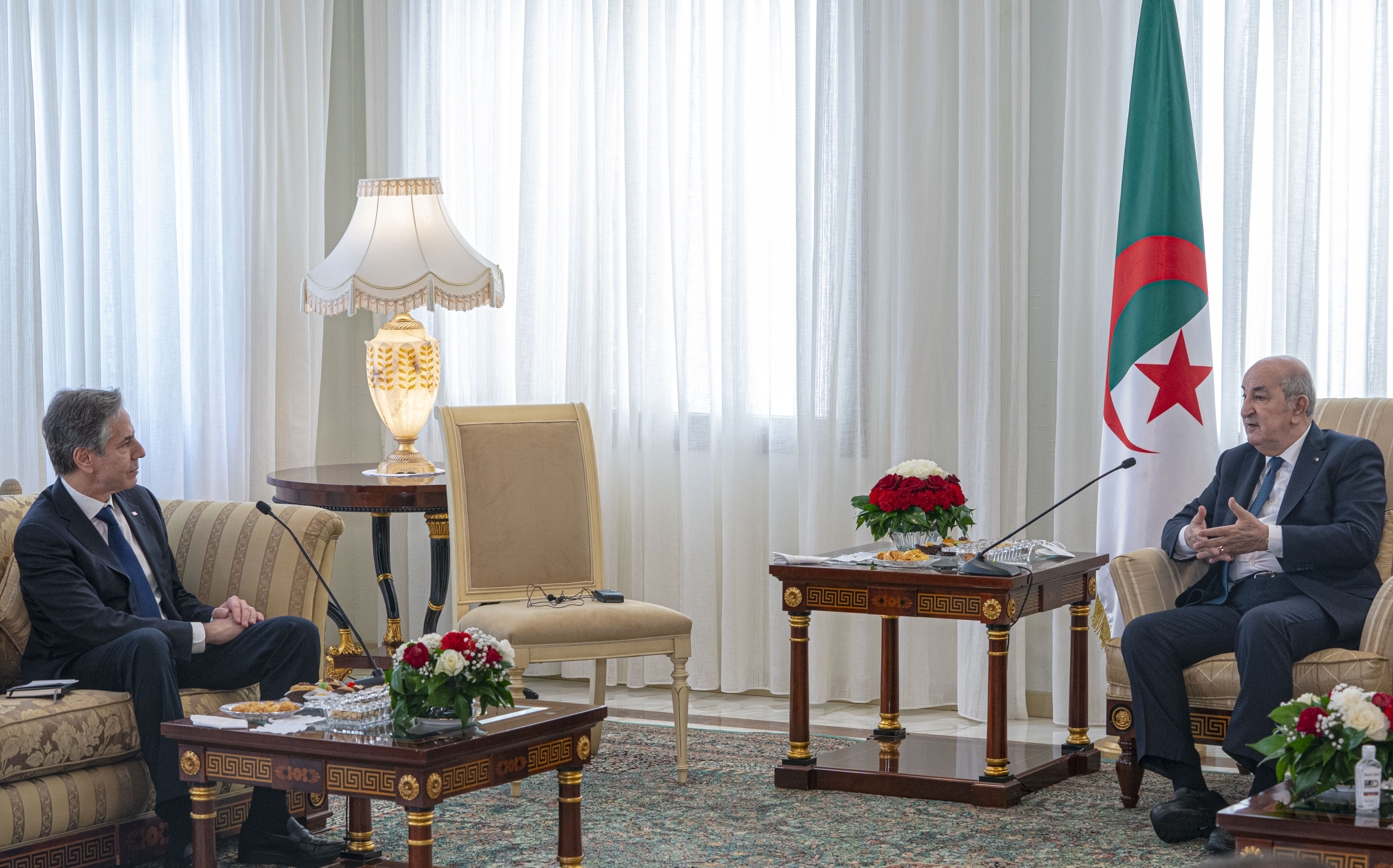
Tebboune meets with U.S. Secretary of State Antony Blinken on 30 March 2022.

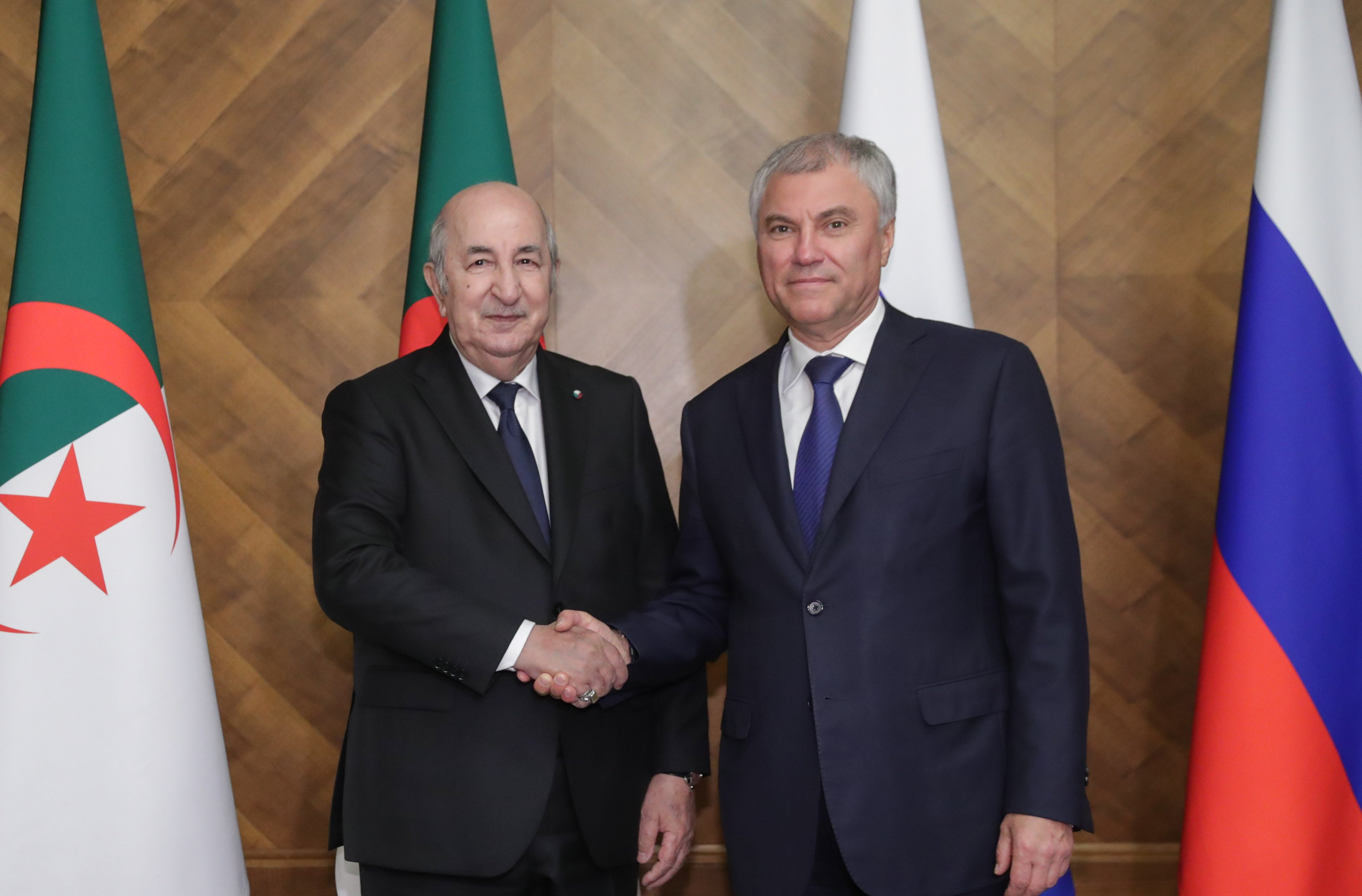
Tebboune with Vladimir Putin's close associate Vyacheslav Volodin in Moscow, Russia on 14 June 2023

On 26 May 2022, during a state visit to Rome, Tebboune agreed to increase gas supply for Italy and Europe after the Russian invasion of Ukraine. On 18 July 2022, Tebboune signed an energy contract worth €4 billion for additional gas supply to Italy with Italian Prime Minister Mario Draghi in Algiers, making Algeria Italy's biggest gas supplier. In September 2022, Tebboune announced a further diversification of Algeria's economy to increase non-hydrocarbon exports. Tebboune stated that "the goal we set is to achieve exports from outside oil and gas at $7 billion for the current year". Algeria's non-hydrocarbon exports reached US$5 billion in 2021.

On 18 December 2022, Tebboune met with French Minister of Interior Gerald Darmanin in Algiers. They discussed bilateral relations, migration, security, and ended the visa issue with France which had limited the number of visas issued to Algerians since September 2021.

On 13 June 2023, Tebboune started a three-day visit to Russia. During a meeting with Russian President Vladimir Putin, they pledged to deepen the "strategic partnership" between Russia and Algeria.

In 2024, he criticized Israel's Gaza war and accused Israel of committing genocide against Palestinians in Gaza.

On 10 September 2026, he decided to cut ties with the United Arab Emirates for what he calls provocative and hostile acts and long-standing interference in regional affairs, including the destabilization of African countries (like Libya, Sudan and Mali), the backing of Morocco during the Western Sahara conflict, the normalisation of ties with Israel under the Abraham Accords, the diplomatic and military footprint in the Sahel region tension, and the blocking of Algeria's entry into the BRICS economic group. Immediate actions taken to signal the end of the diplomatic missions between Algeria and the United Arab Emirates include the expulsion of the Emirati ambassador, who was given 48 hours to leave the country, the ban on UAE-registered civilian and military aircraft from its airspace, and the exemption of commercial flights, which are allowed to continue temporarily until the end of 2026.

== Honours ==
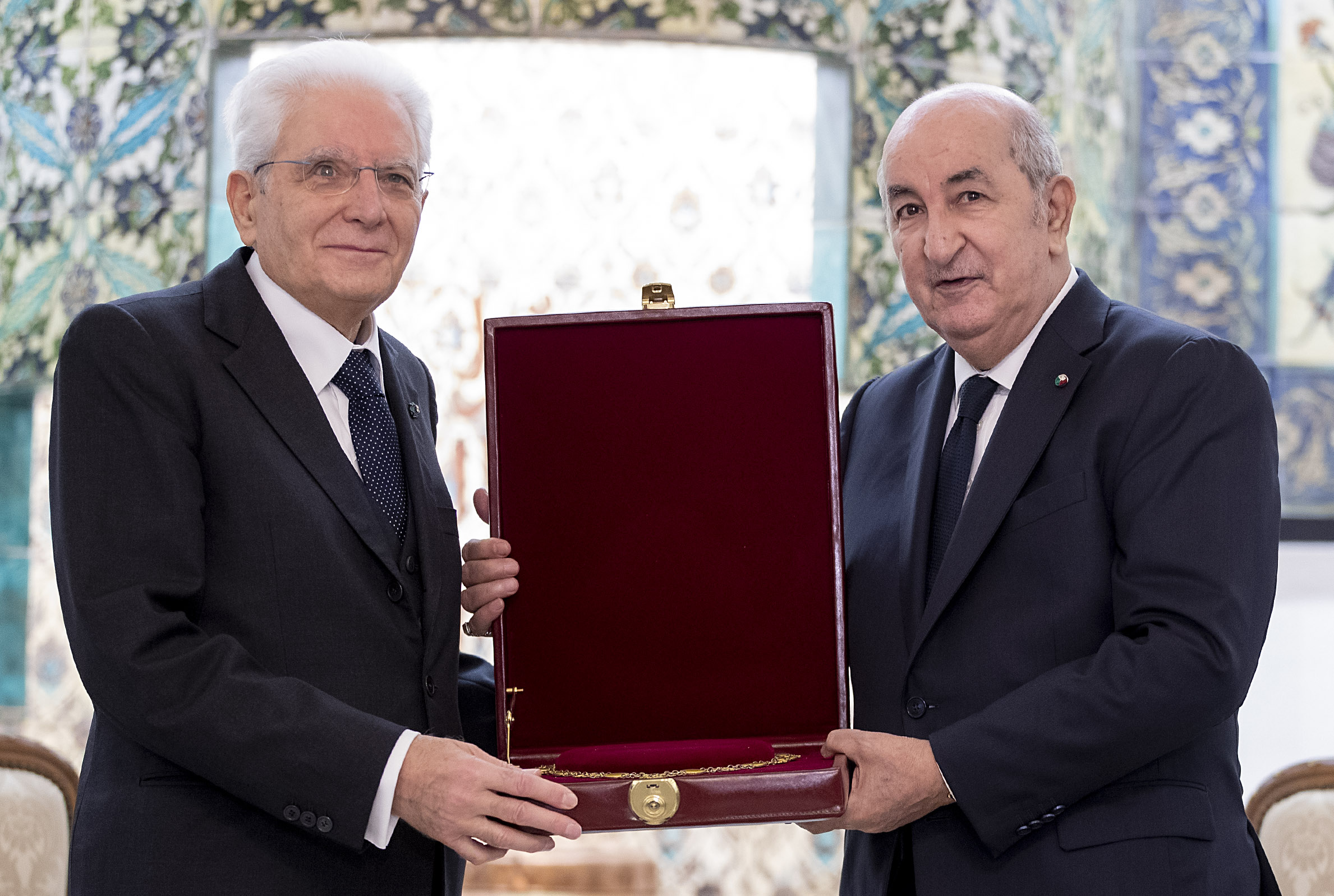
Abdelmadjid Tebboune receiving from the President Sergio Mattarella the Order of Merit of the Italian Republic (Algiers, 3 November 2021)

=== National ===
- Grand Master and Grand Collar of the National Order of Merit

=== Foreign ===
- Italy:
  - Knight Grand Cross with Collar of the Order of Merit of the Italian Republic (3 November 2021)
- Palestine:
  - Grand Collar of the State of Palestine (6 December 2021)
- Tunisia:
  - Grand Collar of the National Order of Merit of Tunisia (15 December 2021)
- Arab League:
  - Collar of the Leader of the Arab Parliament (4 November 2022)
- Jordan:
  - Grand Cordon of the Supreme Order of the Renaissance (4 December 2022)
- Portugal:
  - Grand Collar of the Order of Prince Henry (23 May 2023)
- Russia:
  - Medal of the Order of Friendship (15 June 2023)
- Oman:
  - Grand Collar of the Order of Al Said (29 October 2024)
- Turkey:
  - Collar of the Order of the State of the Republic of Turkey (7 May 2026)
- Angola:
  - Collar of the Order of Agostinho Neto (11 May 2026)

== Personal life ==
Tebboune is a heavy smoker. He is married to Fatima Zohra Bella, and has five children: Saloua, Maha, Salaheddine Ilyes, Mohamed and Khaled.

== See also ==
- Cabinet of Algeria

Political offices
Preceded by Abdelmalek Sellal	Prime Minister of Algeria; 2017	Succeeded by Ahmed Ouyahia
Preceded by Abdelkader Bensalah as Acting Head of State	President of Algeria; 2019–present	Incumbent
