= Aymen Benabderrahmane =

Prime Minister of Algeria from 2021 to 2023

- أيمن بن عبد الرحمان
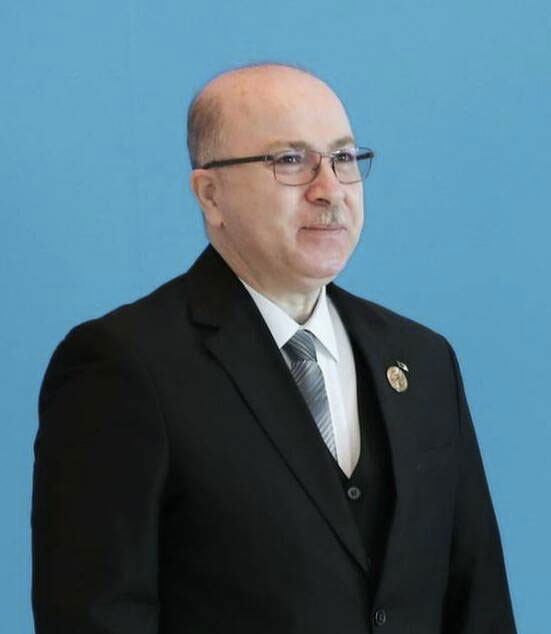
- Benabderrahmane in 2023

19th Prime Minister of Algeria
- In office 30 June 2021 – 11 November 2023
- President: Abdelmadjid Tebboune
- Preceded by: Abdelaziz Djerad
- Succeeded by: Nadir Larbaoui

Minister of Finance
- In office 23 June 2020 – 17 February 2022
- Prime Minister: Abdelaziz Djerad; Himself
- Preceded by: Abderrahmane Raouya
- Succeeded by: Abderrahmane Raouya

Personal details
- Born: 7 November 1960 (age 65) Algiers, Algeria
- Party: Independent
- Education: National School of Administration
- Profession: Politician

Aymen Benabderrahmane (Arabic: أيمن بن عبد الرحمان, romanized: Ayman ibn ʿAbd al-Raḥmān; born 7 November 1960) is an Algerian politician who served as Prime Minister of Algeria from 30 June 2021 to 11 November 2023. He had served as Minister of Finance from June 2020 to February 2022.

== Early life ==
Benabderrahmane was born in 1960 in Algiers. He graduated from the National School of Administration.

== Professional career ==
From 1991 until 2000, he was Inspector of Finance at the General Inspectorate of Finance. From December 2001 until March 2010, Benabderrahmane served as Deputy Director for Control at the General Inspectorate of Finance. In addition, he worked as General Inspector of Finance in 2004 and as General Inspector Chief of Finance in 2006.

Benabderrahmane served as censor of the Bank of Algeria from March 2010 to June 2020. He was promoted to governor of the Bank of Algeria in November 2019, a position he served until June 2020.

== Political career ==
From 23 June 2020 to February 2022, Benabderrahmane served as Minister of Finance. He was appointed prime minister on 30 June 2021 and succeeded Abdelaziz Djerad. On 10 July 2021, Benabderrahmane tested positive for COVID-19. Algerian state TV said that he would quarantine for seven days, but will continue performing his duties virtually.

In July 2023, Benabderrahmane attended the 2023 Russia–Africa Summit in Saint Petersburg and met with Russian President Vladimir Putin.

== Other activities ==
- African Development Bank (AfDB), Ex-Officio Member of the Board of Governors (since 2020)
- World Bank, Ex-Officio Member of the Board of Governors (since 2021)
- Multilateral Investment Guarantee Agency (MIGA), World Bank Group, Ex-Officio Member of the Board of Governors (since 2021)

Government offices
Preceded by Mohamed Loukal	Governor of the Bank of Algeria; 2019–2020	Succeeded by Rosthom Fadli
Political offices
Preceded by Abderrahmane Raouya	Minister of Finance; 2020–2022	Succeeded by Abderrahmane Raouya
Preceded by Abdelaziz Djerad	Prime Minister of Algeria; 2021–2023	Succeeded by Nadir Larbaoui
