= 2010 in Algeria =

- Decades: 1990s; 2000s; 2010s; 2020s
- See also: History of Algeria; List of years in Algeria

Events from the year 2010 in Algeria

== Incumbents ==
- President: Abdelaziz Bouteflika
- Prime Minister: Ahmed Ouyahia

== Events ==
=== January ===
- January 5: Terrorists kidnapped an Algerian engineer who worked for the Canadian firm, SNC-Lavalin.
- January 11: Islamists ransacked and burned a Protestant church in Tizi Ouzou. El Watan reported that parishioners fled the temple after local police failed to protect the Pentecostal temple.
- January 12: More than 1,200 Algerians affected by Hepatitis B and C were treated in 2009. The national organization "SOS hepatitis" expected around 1,000 patients with hepatitis to receive care in 2010.
- January 12: 7,200 ArcelorMittal workers in Algeria went on strike led by the primary steel plant located in Annaba, eastern Algeria. The union leader was Smain Kouadria.
- January 18: Sonatrach and ALNAFT, an Algerian state agency, signed contracts with a consortium of Italian energy group, Enel, Spanish Repsol, and Franco-Belgian GDF Suez, which will explore and exploit a gas field in southeast Algeria.
- January 19: A report transmitted by the Pasteur Institute to the Algerian Ministry of Health, Population, and Hospital Reform stated the results of their technical and administrative report on the H1N1 vaccine Arepanrix. Produced by Glaxo Smith Kline, and imported to Algeria, the four lots were approved by the Pasteur Institute.
- January 20: Four people were killed and fourteen others injured on January 19 in a gas explosion which destroyed a portion of a building in the "Climate France" neighborhood of Algiers.
- January 23: Mohammed Djetti, a Moroccan terrorist disclosed having built strong relationships with members of Al Qaeda in the Islamic Maghreb, including Abdelmalek Droukdal. Following his arrest, he revealed to Moroccan intelligence services that he traveled to Iraq to fight Shiites there. He then went to Turkey with an Algerian friend.
- January 26: Hamer Bouazza tallied in extra time to lift Algeria by Ivory Coast in the quarterfinals of the African Nations Cup.
- January 27: Goldblade, a punk rock band led by John Robb (musician), became the first foreign band to play in Algeria in years. Their concert was promoted by Algeria's sole music magazine, D-Full.
- January 28: Eight people were sentenced from twenty years to life for drug trafficking by the criminal court of Oran. The individuals were convicted in absentia in connection with the seizure of two tons of cannabis on March 18, 2008, in Béchar.

=== February ===
- February 1: Abu Musab Abdul Wadud (Abdelmalek Droukdal) offered training and arms to Nigerian Muslims in a message posted on a jihadist website. On August 19, 2009, Wadud offered sympathy in a message following July clashes with security forces which left many people dead in Nigeria.
- February 2: The European Union wants to further talks with Algeria in June 2010, based on an agreement signed in 2005. The new negotiations will include talks regarding European investment, agriculture, fisheries, and the accession of Algeria to the World Trade Organization.
- February 3: Seven terrorists were killed in the Djelfa province region on February 1 by an operation of security forces in Charek. Charek is fifty miles west of the town of Djelfa. Seven Kalashnikov AK 47 rifles were recovered.
- February 8: Algeria has begun negotiations with Glaxo Smith Kline to reduce the order of H1N1 vaccines from twenty million to five million doses, a Ministry of Health official reports.
- February 10: 488 Toyotas affected by defects revealed by the Japanese have been imported to Algeria. This according to information released by the Algerian Trade Ministry's Economic Control and Fraud Squad.
- February 17: President Abdelaziz Bouteflika has promised Algerian Minister of Youth and Sports, Hachemi Djiar, that he will support sports activities in Algeria. This includes supporting the ticket price to South Africa on the occasion of the World Cup 2010.
- February 22: Four terrorists claimed by al-Qaeda in the Islamic Maghreb have been released in Mali.
- February 25: The fifth session of the Algerian - Omani Joint Committee concluded in Muscat, Oman on February 24. An Algerian- Omani business council was established. It will convene its first meeting in June 2010, coinciding with the opening of the International Fair of Algiers.

=== March ===
- March 2: The slaying of Algerian national police chief, Ali Tounsi, came at a time of heightening political tension between President Bouteflika and his intelligence services. Tounsi, who was head of the police for 16 years, was shot and killed in his Algiers' headquarters on March 3, by a retired army officer.
- March 7: A rift in Algeria's political system may have grown out of a corruption probe into Sonatrach, Algeria's state-owned energy conglomerate. Sonatrach provides 20% of the gas used in Europe.
- March 11: Algeria wants to continue to export gas to Turkey after 2014. 2014 is the date of expiration of a contract between Sonatrach and the Turkish company BOTAŞ. Chakib Khelil, Algerian minister for energy and mines, stated this desire on March 10.
- March 11: In a less than amicable aftermath of soccer matches between Algeria and Egypt during qualifying for the 2010 World Cup, Egyptian football federation spokesman, Medhat Chalabi, said that Samir Zaher had received orders not to apologize to Algeria. Zaher was president of the board of directors of the Egyptian federation.
- March 21: A Spanish engineer who was working in the desert of Ouargla has been missing since March 18 . A large search has been undertaken by a collection of security forces in the Hassi Messaoud desert in search of the engineer.
- March 23: In less than a year after his April 14, 2009, re-election, President Abdelaziz Bouteflika is facing a political crisis. Education and health care are two important sectors of the country rife with demonstrations. Corruption is also becoming more prevalent in Algeria.
- March 23: Portuguese Prime Minister Jose Socrates arrived in Algiers on March 22 for a working visit. He pointed to Algeria's water and renewable energy sectors as attractive investment opportunities.
- March 24: Christopher Ross, United Nations envoy for the Western Sahara, met with President Bouteflika as part of a regional tour intended to resolve a longstanding territorial dispute. Morocco claims hegemony in the Western Sahara.
- March 25: The Algerian operations of ArcelorMittal filed a complaint with a state owned firm, alleging it unfairly missed out on a contract.
- March 31: Chakib Khelil, energy and mines minister, says Algeria is asking prices in excess of $7 per million British thermal units during an "unsustainable" slump in natural gas prices.

=== April ===
- April 2: President Bouteflika affirmed Iran's right to use nuclear power for peaceful purposes. Bouteflika discussed this in a meeting with Iranian foreign minister Manouchehr Mottaki on April 1.
- April 5: Islamist rebels ambushed and murdered seven Algerian security guards who were employed by a Turkish firm. The guards were attacked in the mountainous Kabylie region.
- April 6: Foreign minister Mottaki began a tour of Africa. Thus far he has visited Algeria, Gabon, and Senegal.
- April 12: Sonatrach announced discoveries of oil in the Illizi basin and the southeastern Sahara on April 11. The find was made after two wells were drilled in the perimeter Tinrhert of the Illizi basin. Since the outset of 2010 Sonatrach has reported five new hydrocarbon discoveries.
- April 13: Karim Ziani says that he might leave Vfl Wolfsburg by the summer of 2010. After joining the 2009 champions of the Bundesliga, he has appeared in only ten games during the 2009–10 Bundesliga season. Ziani is under contract with Vfl Wolfsburg until 2013.
- April 14: Orascom Telecom says that it has completed paying a bill of approximately $600 million in tax arrears to the Algerian Treasury, which came due in November 2009. Its subsidiary, OTA paid $113 million on April 13. This was the latest installment of a bill which totaled $587 million.

=== May ===
- May 4: A film concerning Algeria's French colonial past sparked controversy prior to its release at the Cannes Film Festival. Outside of the Law by Rachid Boucharab, a French born filmmaker of Algerian parentage, tells of two brothers who join the struggle for Algerian independence. They had survived the massacre of Setif.
- May 5: A Chinese businessman who runs a private company in Algeria, attempted to bribe an officer of the National Directorate For National Security (DGSN). He brought 2,000 dinars to persuade the official to alter rule records on residence permits for four Chinese nationals in Algeria.
- May 6: Terrorist strife in the Maghreb has been complicated by Algeria's more than thirty years of support for the Polisario Front.
- May 7: 100,000 refugees continue to reside in Polisario's camps in Algeria. Polisario is a Sahrawi national liberation movement which seeks the independence of Western Sahara from Morocco.
- May 14–23: The 5.1–5.3 M_{w} Beni-Ilmane earthquakes occur southeast of Algiers with a maximum EMS-98 intensity of VII (Damaging). Two are killed and 43 are injured.
- May 26: President Jacob Zuma arrived in Algeria on May 25 to attend the 5th session of the South Africa - Algeria Presidential Binational Commission.
- May 27: South Africa has signed a nuclear agreement with Algeria, the South African energy department announced on May 26. The accord was signed in Algiers between energy minister Dipuo Peters and her Algerian counterpart, Dr. Chakib Khelil.
- May 28: President Bouteflika made a government reshuffle on May 28. The Algerian leader currently has Ahmed Ouyahia as prime minister, Nourredine Zerhouni as vice prime minister, and Abdelaziz Belkhadem as minister of state, personal representative of the head of state.
- May 31: CEO Mohammed Mezian, together four vice presidents of Sonatrach, were fired by a presidential decree on May 29. Each was already under house arrest due to an investigation of embezzlement of hundreds of millions of dollars. The announcement of the removal of Chakib Khelil, a former OPEC chief, who was fired from Algeria's Energy Ministry on May 28 because of graft allegations.

=== June ===
- June 1: President Bouteflika was encouraged by Algerian rights groups to open an independent inquiry into assaults of female domestic workers. The assaults have reportedly occurred on bases of foreign oil companies.
- June 1: 32 Algerians were aboard the flotilla of aid-carrying ships attacked by Israel in Gaza on May 31. Reports said there were two casualties among this group.
- June 2: The Algerian government granted 15,000 metric tons of rice as food aid. Abdelkader Messahel, deputy minister for Maghreb and African Affairs, told the Algerie Presse Service on June 2. Mauretania, Mali, Niger, Chad, Zimbabwe, and Ethiopia received the assistance after suffering through periods of extreme dry weather.
- June 14: Algeria lost their initial game in World Cup 2010 to Slovenia, at Peter Mokaba Stadium in Polokwane, South Africa. The Desert Foxes dropped the contest in World Cup Group C after surrendering a single goal to Slovenia.
- June 15: In August 2002 thousands of Algerians gathered outside the offices of Orascom Telecom's stores, hoping to purchase prepaid cards, which for the first time made mobile phones affordable for people of average means.
- June 17: Al-Hadi Rjab, a former entertainment icon in Algeria, is currently unemployed, sick, and forgotten. He is a casualty of the long struggle between Algerian military forces and Islamist rebels.
- July 8: Algerian security forces killed three militants in M'Sila the APS news agency reported. In the al-Nawarah neighborhood of M'Sila troops came in conflict with an unidentified number of militants.
- June 18: Chinese companies are in the middle of a conflict between President Bouteflika and members of the Algerian military and intelligence community. The former are led by General Mohammed Tewfik Mediene. The primary point of contention is the government's ant-corruption campaign.
- June 23: Over 6,000 employees at an ArcelorMittal steel factory are on strike. This despite a court ruling prohibiting them from doing so. The protest is in the eastern Algerian coastal town of Annaba, at the El-Hadjar plant. There are grievances concerning a promised pay rate.
- June 25: Recruiters for Al Qaeda in the Islamic Maghreb are focusing on Algeria's unemployed in recruiting new members. The Mediterranean seaside town of Dellys, population 30,000, the terrorist organization finds a ripe environment. Officially 10.2% of Algerians are unemployed, and 73.4% of this group is below the age of 30.
- June 26: Suspected Islamic rebels murdered 5 people at a wedding party in eastern Algeria. The attack occurred in the hamlet of Ghrab in Tebessa Province, close to the border with Tunisia.
- June 30: In the deadliest attack of the year to-date, suspected Islamic militants killed 11 paramilitary police in an ambush of a military patrol in Tin Zaouatine, close to the border with Mali, in Tamanrasset Province.

=== July ===
- July 5: Algerian president Bouteflika was consoled by Egyptian President Hosni Mubarak following the death of his brother. The trip came after months of tension between Algeria and Egypt.
- July 6: Three Algerian policemen were killed and another was injured during an explosion in the northeast region of the country. In Ziama-Mansouriah a homemade bomb detonated at a beach resort. The location is 35 kilometers west of the northeast city of Jijel.
- July 9: Abdelghani Hamel, an officer of the gendarmerie, took office as head of the Algerian police on July 8. He replaced Ali Tounsi in this position. Originally from the Tlemcen region, he has since 2008 been commander of the Republican Guard.
- July 9: Rabah Saadane, Algerian national team coach, has agreed to continue coaching. The team was eliminated in the first round of the 2010 World Cup held in South Africa. Algeria will play a friendly match against Gabon on August 11.
- July 9: A criminal court in Boumerdès postponed the case of six defendants accused of belonging to an armed terrorist faction until the next criminal court session. There is a delay until a ruling concerning the death certificate of one of those accused. Others belonging to the group are still at large.
- July 17: A hunting party whose members were traveling in eastern Algeria, between the towns of Khenchela and Tebessa, lost four of its members after an explosion near the border with Tunisia. One source said the explosion's source was a homemade device. It was set off remotely in an area in which Al Qaeda in the Islamic Maghreb is very active.
- July 20: Algerian prosecutors denied local newspaper reports which said that the son of a government minister aligned with President Bouteflika Is under criminal investigation.
- July 22: President Bouteflika met with Chinese state councillor Dai Bingguo to discuss meeds of strengthening relations between Algeria and China. The two men also talked about world affairs and regional issues of mutual interest.
- July 24: Algeria is striving to develop additional large reserves of oil and gas to counteract declines it is experiencing in existing field production. The country is working with several oil companies in this endeavor.
- July 26: President Bouteflika attended the 15th African Union Summit in Kampala, Uganda.
- July 28: Abdul Aziz Naji has been repatriated to Algeria from the United States prison at Guantanamo Bay, where he was an inmate beginning in 2002. He returned to the town of Batna, 500 kilometers from Algiers. Naji was opposed to returning to his native country because he feared persecution from the Algerian government and Islamist groups.
- July 31: Algeria is the largest importer of potato seeds in North Africa. On July 29 a delegation of seven members visited the New Brunswick Plant Propagation Center. The Canadian province exported $300,000 in potato exports to Algeria in 2009.

=== August ===
- August 3: H. H Hamad bin Khalifa al-Thani and President Bouteflika discussed ways to strengthen ties between Algeria and Qatar during a visit by the Emir to Algiers. The Emir was joined by Sheikha Mozah following the conclusion of his trip to Lebanon.
- August 5: A 70 million euro shopping mall, financed by Swiss companies Valartis and Jelmoli, opened in Algiers. It is the first western-style mall to open in Algeria. It also marks the entrance of foreign companies into the energy exporting country's retail market.
- August 13: Tahar Wattar, prominent Algerian author of Arabic literature had died at age 74. His books are noted for their themes which explore Algeria's struggle for independence from France.
- August 19: The London based Quds Press International News Agency disclosed that a former Algerian intelligence agent has admitted that Algerian security planned and carried out the bombing of the Hotel Asni in Marrakesh, in 1994. The attack caused the deaths of a number of tourists and locals. Afterward King Hassan II began to require visas for Algerian nationals who wished to visit Morocco.
- August 20: Three people in the town of Djelfa died after intense flooding in Algeria, which resulted in the closing of several major highways.
- August 24: A 9-month kidnapping ordeal in the Sahara Desert concluded on August 23. Members of Al-Qaeda in the Islamic Maghreb freed two Spanish aid workers.

=== September ===
- September 2: Gunmen fired inside a mosque at Ain Defla, southwest of Algiers, during prayers. A large group of people were gathered for prayer during Ramadan. A sheikh guiding prayer was killed by gunfire and several persons were taken to a hospital in serious condition.
- September 7: Algerian publisher, Barzakh Editions, will receive the Principal Prince Claus Award of €100,000 on December 17, 2010. The business is one of ten other laureates to be honored at the Royal Palace (Amsterdam).
- September 10: Police in the province of Bejaya detained ten young men for eating in public, a violation of Ramadan. The men face up to two years in prison if convicted.
- September 14: Security forces killed two Islamic extremists in the Tebessa region, 600 km east of Algiers. The Islamists attacked a communal guard post near Tlydjen about 50 km south of Tebessa.
- September 23: Algerian international soccer player, Karim Ziani of Vfl Wolfsburg, could be out of action until December. He has been told that he needs a hip operation.
- September 24: Outside The Times, a thriller about Algeria's struggle for independence debuted in France on September 23. The film opens with a scene of mostly unarmed Algerians being murdered by French soldiers in the town of Setif.

=== October ===
- October 11: Torrential rains caused the deaths of seven people in Algeria. Five people were swept away in a car which was carried away by a river which jumped its banks. The five car passenger perished in Djelfa, about 300 kilometers south of Algiers.
- October 12: Terramin Australia Ltd reported that its Algerian zinc mine will be among the six largest zinc mines in the world. The cost to construct it will be $589 million. The firm is based in Adelaide, South Australia and will take 57 months to complete its venture.
- October 13: At least five persons died following a bomb explosion at a construction site close to the Algeria-Tunisia border. The attack was aimed at construction officials who were examining the construction site of new homes. It came near Tebessa, approximately 600 kilometers east of Algiers.
- October 30: President Bouteflika opened the Algeria - Cuba Ophthalmologic Hospital in the province of Ouargla on October 28, 2010. It is a project which is an outgrowth of Algerian - Cuban friendship.

=== November ===
- November 1: Imprisoned since September 21, 2010, vocal Sahrawi leader Mustapha Salma Sidi Ould Mouloud, has been shot and possibly seriously injured by his captors, the Polisario militia and Algerian security.
- November 2: President Barack Obama offered congratulations to the people of Algeria on their National Day, November 1.
- November 2: An Algerian minister says that Orascom Telecom owes the Algerian government $400,000 in debts remaining from a former subsidiary.
- November 3: Azerbaijani President Ilham Aliyev congratulated Algerian President Bouteflika on the national holiday of the People's Democratic Republic of Algeria-Revolution Day.
- November 26: Algeria is clamping down on imports of books which preach the very conservative Salafist branch of Islam. It is part of a move to dissuade the growing popularity of the ideology.
- November 27: Four converts to Christianity were placed on trial for illegally opening a place of worship. The defendants range in age from 35 to 45. They are charged with establishing a Protestant church in the region without the approval of authorities.
- November 30: Four Algerian soldiers and two Islamic militants were killed in clashes in northern Algeria. The confrontation between security forces and Islamic extremists occurred in Tenes, near Chelf province.

=== December ===
- December 5: According to WikiLeaks Algerian president Bouteflika said that the country's military respected its civilian leadership, unlike in Turkey. A report of his comments was made public in Africom, whose head the Algerian president talked with,
- December 6: Algeria announced a 20-year program of renewable energy. The effort will tap alternate sources of energy, i.e. solar and wind power, to produce electricity.
- December 6: Members of the National Popular Army (ANP) have killed two terrorist leaders, the heads of the "al-Arkham phalanx". Habib Mourad, aka Nuh, and Abdeslam Samir were eliminated near Boulafrat. Mourad was the chief of "al-Arkham" while Samir was its primary communication officer.
- December 7: The Algerian football team continued its preparation in Algeria for the second African Nations Championship. The championship is to be held in the Sudan from February 4, 2011 – February 25, 2011.
- December 8: President Bouteflika arrived in Germany on December 7 for a two-day official visit at the invitation of German President Angela Merkel.
- December 28: Le Monde discussed the book "Al Qaeda in the Islamic Maghreb", a book written by the Algerian author Anis Rahmani.
- December 28: Algeria and Tunisia signed a number of cooperation agreements during a visit by Tunisian Prime Minister Mohamed Ghannouchi.
- December 30 : Sonatrach reports that revenues from gas and oil should reach almost $57 billion in 2010, according to forecasts. Production is expected to reach 220 million tons of oil in 2010. Production of oil reached 222.5 million in 2009 and 231.9 million in 2008.
- December 30 : President Bouteflika signed the finance bill for 2011, which includes 3.434 trillion dinars operation and 3.184 billion dinars equipment. In current rates in dollars this is $46.431 and $43.05 billion, respectively.

=== Full date unknown ===
- Dans le silence, je sens rouler la terre documentary film is released.
