= 2006 in Algeria =

- Decades: 1980s; 1990s; 2000s; 2010s; 2020s
- See also: History of Algeria; List of years in Algeria

The following lists events that happened during 2006 in Algeria.

== Incumbents ==
- President: Abdelaziz Bouteflika
- Prime Minister: Ahmed Ouyahia (until 24 May), Abdelaziz Belkhadem (starting 24 May)

== Events ==
=== March ===
- March 12 – Abdelhak Layada, one of the founders of the Armed Islamic Group (GIA), is released from prison due to the February 28, 2006, national reconciliation charter decree of application.
- March 20 – An earthquake measuring 5.2 Mw affected the Béjaïa Province, leaving dozens of damaged and destroyed homes and four dead. The shock's intensity, indicated by modeling, was VI (Strong).
