= List of years in Algeria =

This is a list of years in Algeria. For only articles about years in Algeria that have been written, see Category:Years in Algeria.

== Twenty-first century ==
2020s
2020
2021
2022
2023
2024
2025

2010s
2010
2011
2012
2013
2014
2015
2016
2017
2018
2019

2000s
2000
2001
2002
2003
2004
2005
2006
2007
2008
2009

== Twentieth century ==
2000 - 1999 - 1998 - 1997 - 1996 - 1995 - 1994 - 1993 - 1992 - 1991
1990 - 1989 - 1988 - 1987 - 1986 - 1985 - 1984 - 1983 - 1982 - 1981
1980 - 1979 - 1978 - 1977 - 1976 - 1975 - 1974 - 1973 - 1972 - 1971
1970 - 1969 - 1968 - 1967 - 1966 - 1965 - 1964 - 1963 - 1962 - 1961
1960 - 1959 - 1958 - 1957 - 1956 - 1955 - 1954 - 1953 - 1952 - 1951
1950 - 1949 - 1948 - 1947 - 1946 - 1945 - 1944 - 1943 - 1942 - 1941
1940 - 1939 - 1938 - 1937 - 1936 - 1935 - 1934 - 1933 - 1932 - 1931
1930 - 1929 - 1928 - 1927 - 1926 - 1925 - 1924 - 1923 - 1922 - 1921
1920 - 1919 - 1918 - 1917 - 1916 - 1915 - 1914 - 1913 - 1912 - 1911
1910 - 1909 - 1908 - 1907 - 1906 - 1905 - 1904 - 1903 - 1902 - 1901

== Nineteenth century ==
1900 - 1899 - 1898 - 1897 - 1896 - 1895 - 1894 - 1893 - 1892 - 1891
1890 - 1889 - 1888 - 1887 - 1886 - 1885 - 1884 - 1883 - 1882 - 1881
1880 - 1879 - 1878 - 1877 - 1876 - 1875 - 1874 - 1873 - 1872 - 1871
1870 - 1869 - 1868 - 1867 - 1866 - 1865 - 1864 - 1863 - 1862 - 1861
1860 - 1859 - 1858 - 1857 - 1856 - 1855 - 1854 - 1853 - 1852 - 1851
1850 - 1849 - 1848 - 1847 - 1846 - 1845 - 1844 - 1843 - 1842 - 1841
1840 - 1839 - 1838 - 1837 - 1836 - 1835 - 1834 - 1833 - 1832 - 1831
1830 - 1829 - 1828 - 1827 - 1826 - 1825 - 1824 - 1823 - 1822 - 1821
1820 - 1819 - 1818 - 1817 - 1816 - 1815 - 1814 - 1813 - 1812 - 1811
1810 - 1809 - 1808 - 1807 - 1806 - 1805 - 1804 - 1803 - 1802 - 1801

== Eighteenth century ==
1800 - 1799 - 1798 - 1797 - 1796 - 1795 - 1794 - 1793 - 1792 - 1791
1790 - 1789 - 1788 - 1787 - 1786 - 1785 - 1784 - 1783 - 1782 - 1781
1780 - 1779 - 1778 - 1777 - 1776 - 1775 - 1774 - 1773 - 1772 - 1771
1770 - 1769 - 1768 - 1767 - 1766 - 1765 - 1764 - 1763 - 1762 - 1761
1760 - 1759 - 1758 - 1757 - 1756 - 1755 - 1754 - 1753 - 1752 - 1751
1750 - 1749 - 1748 - 1747 - 1746 - 1745 - 1744 - 1743 - 1742 - 1741
1740 - 1739 - 1738 - 1737 - 1736 - 1735 - 1734 - 1733 - 1732 - 1731
1730 - 1729 - 1728 - 1727 - 1726 - 1725 - 1724 - 1723 - 1722 - 1721
1720 - 1719 - 1718 - 1717 - 1716 - 1715 - 1714 - 1713 - 1712 - 1711
1710 - 1709 - 1708 - 1707 - 1706 - 1705 - 1704 - 1703 - 1702 - 1701

== Seventeenth century ==
1700 - 1699 - 1698 - 1697 - 1696 - 1695 - 1694 - 1693 - 1692 - 1691
1690 - 1689 - 1688 - 1687 - 1686 - 1685 - 1684 - 1683 - 1682 - 1681
1680 - 1679 - 1678 - 1677 - 1676 - 1675 - 1674 - 1673 - 1672 - 1671
1670 - 1669 - 1668 - 1667 - 1666 - 1665 - 1664 - 1663 - 1662 - 1661
1660 - 1659 - 1658 - 1657 - 1656 - 1655 - 1654 - 1653 - 1652 - 1651
1650 - 1649 - 1648 - 1647 - 1646 - 1645 - 1644 - 1643 - 1642 - 1641
1640 - 1639 - 1638 - 1637 - 1636 - 1635 - 1634 - 1633 - 1632 - 1631
1630 - 1629 - 1628 - 1627 - 1626 - 1625 - 1624 - 1623 - 1622 - 1621
1620 - 1619 - 1618 - 1617 - 1616 - 1615 - 1614 - 1613 - 1612 - 1611
1610 - 1609 - 1608 - 1607 - 1606 - 1605 - 1604 - 1603 - 1602 - 1601

== Sixteenth century ==
1600 - 1599 - 1598 - 1597 - 1596 - 1595 - 1594 - 1593 - 1592 - 1591
1590 - 1589 - 1588 - 1587 - 1586 - 1585 - 1584 - 1583 - 1582 - 1581
1580 - 1579 - 1578 - 1577 - 1576 - 1575 - 1574 - 1573 - 1572 - 1571
1570 - 1569 - 1568 - 1567 - 1566 - 1565 - 1564 - 1563 - 1562 - 1561
1560 - 1559 - 1558 - 1557 - 1556 - 1555 - 1554 - 1153 - 1552 - 1551
1550 - 1549 - 1548 - 1547 - 1546 - 1545 - 1544 - 1543 - 1542 - 1541
1540 - 1539 - 1538 - 1537 - 1536 - 1535 - 1534 - 1533 - 1532 - 1531
1530 - 1529 - 1528 - 1527 - 1526 - 1525 - 1524 - 1523 - 1522 - 1521
1520 - 1519 - 1518 - 1517 - 1516 - 1515 - 1514 - 1513 - 1512 - 1511
1510 - 1509 - 1508 - 1507 - 1516 - 1505 - 1504 - 1503 - 1502 - 1501

== Fifteenth century ==
1500 - 1499 - 1498 - 1497 - 1496 - 1495 - 1494 - 1493 - 1492 - 1491
1490 - 1489 - 1488 - 1487 - 1486 - 1485 - 1484 - 1483 - 1482 - 1481
1480 - 1479 - 1478 - 1477 - 1476 - 1475 - 1474 - 1473 - 1472 - 1471
1470 - 1469 - 1468 - 1467 - 1466 - 1465 - 1464 - 1463 - 1462 - 1461
1460 - 1459 - 1458 - 1457 - 1456 - 1455 - 1454 - 1453 - 1452 - 1451
1450 - 1449 - 1448 - 1447 - 1446 - 1445 - 1444 - 1443 - 1442 - 1441
1440 - 1439 - 1438 - 1437 - 1436 - 1435 - 1434 - 1433 - 1432 - 1431
1430 - 1429 - 1428 - 1427 - 1426 - 1425 - 1424 - 1423 - 1422 - 1421
1420 - 1419 - 1418 - 1417 - 1416 - 1415 - 1414 - 1413 - 1412 - 1411
1410 - 1409 - 1408 - 1407 - 1406 - 1405 - 1404 - 1403 - 1402 - 1401

== Fourteenth century ==
1400 - 1399 - 1398 - 1397 - 1396 - 1395 - 1394 - 1393 - 1392 - 1391
1390 - 1389 - 1388 - 1387 - 1386 - 1385 - 1384 - 1383 - 1382 - 1381
1380 - 1379 - 1378 - 1377 - 1376 - 1375 - 1374 - 1373 - 1372 - 1371
1370 - 1369 - 1368 - 1367 - 1366 - 1365 - 1364 - 1363 - 1362 - 1361
1360 - 1359 - 1358 - 1357 - 1356 - 1355 - 1354 - 1353 - 1352 - 1351
1350 - 1349 - 1348 - 1347 - 1346 - 1345 - 1344 - 1343 - 1342 - 1341
1340 - 1339 - 1338 - 1337 - 1336 - 1335 - 1334 - 1333 - 1332 - 1331
1330 - 1329 - 1328 - 1327 - 1326 - 1325 - 1324 - 1323 - 1322 - 1321
1320 - 1319 - 1318 - 1317 - 1316 - 1315 - 1314 - 1313 - 1312 - 1311
1310 - 1309 - 1308 - 1307 - 1306 - 1305 - 1304 - 1303 - 1302 - 1301

== Thirteenth century ==
1300 - 1299 - 1298 - 1297 - 1296 - 1295 - 1984 - 1293 - 1292 - 1291
1290 - 1289 - 1288 - 1287 - 1286 - 1285 - 1284 - 1283 - 1282 - 1281
1280 - 1279 - 1278 - 1277 - 1276 - 1275 - 1274 - 1273 - 1272 - 1271
1270 - 1269 - 1268 - 1267 - 1266 - 1265 - 1264 - 1263 - 1262 - 1261
1260 - 1259 - 1258 - 1257 - 1256 - 1255 - 1254 - 1253 - 1252 - 1251
1250 - 1249 - 1248 - 1247 - 1246 - 1245 - 1244 - 1243 - 1242 - 1241
1240 - 1239 - 1238 - 1237 - 1236 - 1235 - 1234 - 1233 - 1232 - 1231
1230 - 1229 - 1228 - 1227 - 1226 - 1225 - 1224 - 1223 - 1222 - 1221
1220 - 1219 - 1218 - 1217 - 1216 - 1215 - 1214 - 1213 - 1212 - 1211
1210 - 1209 - 1208 - 1207 - 1206 - 1205 - 1204 - 1203 - 1202 - 1201

== Twelfth century ==
1200 - 1199 - 1198 - 1197 - 1196 - 1195 - 1194 - 1193 - 1192 - 1191
1190 - 1189 - 1188 - 1187 - 1186 - 1185 - 1184 - 1183 - 1182 - 1181
1180 - 1179 - 1178 - 1177 - 1176 - 1175 - 1174 - 1173 - 1172 - 1171
1170 - 1169 - 1168 - 1167 - 1166 - 1165 - 1164 - 1163 - 1162 - 1161
1160 - 1159 - 1158 - 1157 - 1156 - 1155 - 1154 - 1153 - 1152 - 1151
1150 - 1149 - 1148 - 1147 - 1146 - 1145 - 1144 - 1143 - 1142 - 1141
1140 - 1139 - 1138 - 1137 - 1136 - 1135 - 1134 - 1133 - 1132 - 1131
1130 - 1129 - 1128 - 1127 - 1126 - 1125 - 1124 - 1123 - 1122 - 1121
1120 - 1119 - 1118 - 1117 - 1116 - 1115 - 1114 - 1113 - 1112 - 1111
1110 - 1109 - 1108 - 1107 - 1106 - 1105 - 1104 - 1103 - 1102 - 1101

== Eleventh century ==
11th century in Algeria

== First millennium AD ==
10th century in Algeria
9th century in Algeria
8th century in Algeria
7th century in Algeria
6th century in Algeria
5th century in Algeria
4th century in Algeria
3rd century in Algeria
2nd century in Algeria
First century in Algeria

== See also ==
- Timeline of Algeria
- Timeline of Algiers
- Timeline of Oran
- List of years by country

== Bibliography ==
- "Algeria". Political Chronology of Africa. Political Chronologies of the World. Europa Publications. 2001. p. 1+. ISBN 0203409957.
