= 2021 in Algeria =

- Decades: 2000s; 2010s; 2020s
- See also: History of Algeria; List of years in Algeria

Events from 2021 in Algeria.

== Incumbents ==
- President: Abdelmadjid Tebboune
- Prime Minister: Abdelaziz Djerad (until 30 June); Aymen Benabderrahmane onwards

== Events ==
Ongoing – COVID-19 pandemic in Algeria

=== January ===
- January 1
  - President Abdelmadjid Tebboune signs the new constitution, approved in November 2020. He also said he hopes to soon start applying the Russian-made Sputnik V vaccine against COVID-19.
  - Twenty people are killed and 11 injured when a vehicle overturns near Ain Amguel, Tamanrasset Province. Nineteen people, including children, are African nationals, and Tamanrasset, is regarded as a transit point for migrants seeking to go to Europe.
- January 2 – Three top officials, including the younger brother of former President Abdelaziz Bouteflika, Saïd, are acquitted after a September 2019 arrest.
- January 14 – A homemade bomb kills five civilians in Tebessa Province. An armed rebel is killed in Khenchela Province. It is not known if the incidents are related.
- January 20 – French President Emmanuel Macron refuses to apologize for colonialism or the Algerian War.
- January (date unknown) – Reuters reports fighting between militants and government troops in Aïn Defla Province.

=== February ===
- February 8 – Cherif Belmihoub, a minister in charge of economic projections, warns that Algeria′s energy exports are falling and the country may cease to be an exporter of crude within a decade.
- February 12 – President Tebboune, 74, returns from Germany after a second bout with COVID-19.
- February 18 – Tebboune says he will dissolve Parliament and free political prisoners.
- February 19 – Journalist Khaled Drareni and thirty other activists are released from prison in Koléa, Tipaza Province on the second anniversary of the Hirak Movement.
- February 26 – Protesters take to the streets of Algiers and other cities in a renewal of the Friday Hirak movement protests, suspended because of the COVID-19 pandemic.

=== March ===
- March 5 – Thousands of protesters march on the second Friday in a row.

=== August ===
- 10 August – Death toll rises to 42, including 25 soldiers, after massive wildfires spread throughout 18 wilayas in Algeria, particularly in Kabylia.
- 11 August – Algerian President Abdelmadjid Tebboune declares 3 days of national mourning as death toll soars to 65 following massive forest fires in Kabylie.
- 12 August – At least 22 suspected arsonists are arrested by authorities following the fires in Kabylie.

== Scheduled events ==
- June 12 – 2021 Algerian parliamentary election
- TBA – Local elections

== Sports ==
- August 24 to September 5 – Algeria at the 2020 Summer Paralympics
- 2020–21 in Algerian football

== Deaths ==
- January 2 – Mirzaq Biqtash, 75, writer.
- January 18 – Jean-Pierre Bacri, 69, Algerian-born French actor (Same Old Song, Place Vendôme) and screenwriter (The Taste of Others); cancer.
- January 22 – Guem, 73, musician, composer and dancer.
- March 17 – Rym Ghezali, 38, actress (El Wa3ra).
- March 27 – Redha Hamiani, 76, politician.
- September 10 – Saadi Yacef, 93, independence fighter, politician and actor.

== See also ==
- COVID-19 pandemic in Africa
- 2020s
- African Union
- Arab League
- Berber languages
- al-Qaeda in the Islamic Maghreb
- Islamic State – Algeria Province
