= Ministry of Religious Affairs and Endowments (Algeria) =

Government ministry of Algeria

The Ministry of Religious Affairs and Wakfs (Arabic: وزارة الشؤون الدينية والأوقاف, French: Ministère des affaires religieuses et des wakfs) is a ministry of Algeria. Its head office is in Hydra, Algiers.

== Ministers ==
Several ministers have succeeded in this ministerial post in successive Algerian governments:

Chronology of ministers of religious affairs and endowments in Algeria
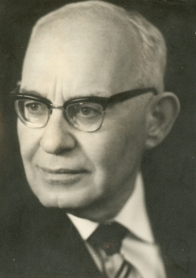
N°	Minister	From	To	Image
01	Ahmed Tewfik El Madani	September 27, 1962	December 2, 1964
02	Tedjini Haddam	December 2, 1964	July 10, 1965
03	Larbi Saadouni	July 10, 1965	June 1, 1970
04	Mouloud Kacem Naît Belkacem	June 1, 1970	March 8, 1979
05	Boualem Baki	March 8, 1979	July 15, 1980
06	Abderrahmane Chibane	July 15, 1980	February 18, 1986
07	Boualem Baki	February 18, 1986	September 9, 1989
08	Saïd Chibane	September 9, 1989	June 4, 1991
09	M'hamed Benredouane	June 18, 1991	February 22, 1992
10	Sassi Lamouri	February 22, 1992	August 21, 1993
11	Abdelhafid Amokrane	August 21, 1993	April 11, 1994
12	Sassi Lamouri	April 15, 1994	December 31, 1995
13	Ahmed Merani	December 31, 1995	June 10, 1997
14	Bouabdellah Ghlamallah	June 24, 1997	April 29, 2014
15	Mohamed Aïssa	April 29, 2014	April 1, 2019
16	Youcef Belmehdi	April 1, 2019	Nowadays

== See also ==
- Algerian Islamic reference
- Islam in Algeria
- Religion in Algeria
