= 2011 in Algeria =

- Decades: 1990s; 2000s; 2010s; 2020s
- See also: History of Algeria; List of years in Algeria

Events from the year 2011 in Algeria

== Incumbents ==
- President: Abdelaziz Bouteflika
- Prime Minister: Ahmed Ouyahia

=== January ===
- January 11: Riots in towns and the countryside of Algeria have accounted for 5 deaths, 677 injuries, and more than 1,000 arrests. Food products lobbies have succeeded in reducing taxes on import transactions by 41%. The riots adverse effects include the burden on Algerian families, which are having to pay the bills for damages incurred.
- January 11: The law firm Shearman and Sterling has been selected to evaluate the mobile operator Djezzy, a subsidiary of Orascom. The Algerian state hopes to purchase OTA Djezzy. Nine other consulting firms and investment banks offered bids to evaluate Djezzy.
- January 13: Algeria has imported more than one billion dollars (800 million Euros) of brown sugar and crude oil in 2010.
- January 14 Renault pledges to continue its operations in Algeria despite damages it has incurred during the recent riots. Company spokeswoman, Amel Boutamene, says the French auto manufacturer will remain because Algeria is a booming country.
- January 31: A man from the Bordj Bou Arréridj region became the third person from Algeria to commit suicide by self-immolation. He died from his burns while another man in Algiers attempted to kill himself in the same manner.

=== February ===
- February 2: Air Algérie has extended attractive discounts for the elderly, students, and the unemployed to destinations in the Middle East, Europe, and the United States. The promotion lasts until the conclusion of 2011.
- February 2: Algeria's inflation rate reached 3.9% in 2010 as compared with 5.7% in 2009. The source of the information is the National Statistics Office.
- February 5 An Italian female tourist, age 56, traveling alone with a guide and a driver, was kidnapped in southern Algeria. The kidnappers, numbering a dozen persons, took the woman to an unknown destination, She had earlier contacted a travel agency in Djanet, near the border with Libya.
- February 19: Algeria has remained relatively calm despite the turmoil experienced by other countries in the Middle East and North Africa. Conditions seem favorable for a revolt, however one comparable to those in Egypt and Italy, is unlikely in the near future.
- February 7: Nineteen Algeria Post employees have been accused of embezzling more than sixteen billion centimes from the accounts of citizens and public utilities enterprises.
- February 26: Approximately 50 protestors attended a banned rally in Algiers. This number was less than expected and indicated that opposition hopes in Algeria are fading.
- February 26 The Algerian government ended a nineteen-year-old state of emergency which had been imposed to combat an Islamist insurgency. The sanctions were imposed initially in 1992. The ban was renewed indefinitely in 1993. The repeal made possible the expansion of civil liberties such as freedom of speech and freedom of the press.
- February 27: Around 200 riot police were employed to block an opposition effort to stage an anti-government rally in the center of Algiers.

=== March ===
- March 17: Beji Caid Essebsi, Prime Minister of the Provisional Government of Tunisia, and special envoy of Tunisia's acting president, arrived in Algiers for a one-day visit. He came to discuss the situation in Tunisia after the country's revolt.
- March 20: Algeria's top Salafist leader, Sheikh Abdelmalek Ramdani, contends that democracy is opposed to Islam. Ramdani resides in Saudi Arabia. He encourages Muslims to ignore all calls for change. Also, he believes that Algerians should obey their leader as long as he is a Muslim.
- March 21: President Bouteflika pledged to initiate political reforms in Algeria. The improvements promised to address government repression, poverty, and unemployment.
- March 22: Algeria is planning major forestry projects through a new state-owned agricultural engineering firm in 2011. The projects will be funded by an 18 billion dinar contract.
- March 23: Algeria's capability for producing drinking water has increased by three times in the past decade.
- March 25: Approximately fifty people were injured, including five police officers, during soccer fans rush to purchase tickets for the CAN 2012 qualifier match between Morocco and Algeria. The tickets were being sold in Annaba, Algeria.
- March 29: Doctors who work in hospitals began an indefinite strike. They desire a generally better situation and refuse random assignments to remote regions of the country.
- March 31: The Ministry of Education has decided to integrate all contract teachers after ten days of protests outside the headquarters of the presidency of the republic in Algiers.

=== April ===
- April 17: The proposed reforms of President Bouteflika received only sparse support from independent media and the opposition. Critics stated that the Algerian leader failed to meet expectations for genuine change.
- April 20: Frank LaRue, United Nations Special Rapporteur on the right to freedom of opinion and expression, asked Algeria to guarantee the right to freedom of opinion and expression. He included a plea to decriminalize defamation.
- April 23: The movie Of Gods and Men, based on the book The Monks of Tibhirine by John W. Kiser, tells the story of seven French monks who were violently murdered. Their severed heads were found on a road near Medea, Algeria, on May 30, 1996. The film is directed by Xavier Beauvois.
- April 24: Police used truncheons to beat down pro-reform activists outside parliament. Organizers noted that the police action prevented an anti-government rally. Among the protesters were hundreds of teachers who had assembled in central Algiers. Only 2 kilometers away was a protest called by the National Coordination for Democracy and Change (CNDC).
- April 26: The current protests in Algeria are similar to those in other North African nations, i.e. in their demands for democratic reforms, freedom from corruption, and civil rights. The last election, in which President Bouteflika took 90.2% of the vote, was boycotted by opposition parties which charged widespread fraud.
- April 28: Two Algerian paramilitary police were killed during a bomb attack near Bordj Menaiel. The site is approximately 80 kilometers east of Algiers. The attack occurred in the mountainous Kabylie region, an area which Al Qaeda in the Islamic Maghreb use as a base.

=== May ===
- May 16: President Bouteflika plans a release of several thousand Islamist prisoners to help ease memories of a conflict which killed an estimated 200,000 people.
- May 19: One million Algerians will receive training in information and communications technologies. This was announced by Moussa Benhamadi, the Minister of Post and Information and Communication Technologies.
- May 24: Alistair Burt, English Minister for the Middle East and North Africa, commended the beginning of negotiations for political reform in Algeria.
- International Christian Concern has discovered that Algerian authorities ordered the closing of seven Protestant churches in the province of Béjaïa, in early May.
- May 31: Siagh Krimo, an Algerian Christian, was sentenced to five years in prison on May 25. The jail term occurred after he disclosed his faith to a neighbor. Algeria has a blasphemy law which outlaws acts which insult the prophet Mohammed, and any messengers of God.

=== June ===
- June 11: 46 women suspected of prostitution were arrested in Tichi, a popular seaside resort. They were charged with incitement to debauchery. Echourouk, a daily newspaper, reported the arrests.
- June 15: The high commissioner of police in Béjaïa ordered all Christian churches closed. This edict includes all places of worship currently under construction. He threatened extreme consequences if the order is not obeyed.
- June 16: The Algerian parliament passed a budget law which encompassed numerous subsidies. The statute is designed to dispel growing public unrest concerning jobs and high consumer prices.
- June 23: Two months of talks on the subject of amending Algeria's constitution have concluded. The discussions have made a path for Algeria to institute reforms instead of experiencing the crises which other North African nations have, during a pro-democracy wave.
- June 26: Two months of meetings regarding how to amend Algeria's constitution have concluded. The consultations have made possible the implementation of reforms designed to prevent an uprising similar to those which have occurred in Tunisia and Libya.

=== July ===
- July 7: Algeria has been more subtle in its reaction against the Bouteflika regime when compared to the revolutions of its North African and Middle Eastern neighbors, i.e. Tunisia, Libya, and Egypt.
- July 17: A double suicide attack occurred in the small town of Bordj Menail, sixty kilometers east of Algiers. Two people were killed and fourteen injured.
- July 21: Several Algerian soldiers were wounded, a number of them seriously, during a roadside bomb attack against their convoy southeast of Algiers.
- July 25: Yahia Douri, the sub-director of the Algiers Religious Affairs Ministry, claimed that 134 foreigners have converted to Islam in Algeria, in 2011.

=== August ===
- August 4: Relatives of seventeen Algerian sailors held by Somali pirates since January 2011, demonstrated, demanding the captives release. They are afraid the men will not survive the famine in Somalia and the Ramadan fast.
- August 11: Henry Ensher, the new U.S. Ambassador to Algeria, said that he expects Algiers to play a prominent role in the Arab region and Africa. He spoke in Algiers.
- August 11: Algeria announced that it would provide $10 million in aid for victims of famine and drought in countries in the Horn of Africa region.

=== September ===
- September 1: The Emir of Qatar flew to see President Bouteflika earlier this summer. He came to advise the Algerian president not to give support to the regime of Muammar Gaddafi. Algeria previously supported Gaddafi because it refused to accept orders from abroad.
- September 27: An escalation in attacks by Al Qaeda is threatening to undermine the political stability of the pro-western Bouteflika regime. After the January 2011 political dissension in Algeria, the government guaranteed reforms. The effort to curtail popular discontent continues.
- September 27: Algeria and Qatar held talks in Algiers. Qatar's prime minister and foreign minister, Sheikh Hamad bin Jassam bin Jabor Al-Thani and Algeria's prime minister, Ahmed Ouyahia, were the principals in the discussions.
- September 28: Algerian troops killed six militants in an extensive move versus hideouts used by Al-Qaeda's regional franchise, east of Algiers. Elite troops swept the Chouicha forest near Boumerdès, just sixty miles east of the capitol.

=== October ===
- October 6: Hachemi Sanouni, a founder of the Islamic Salvation Front, and Abderazek Zeraoui Hamadache, asked Algerians to demand the closing of all bars and stores where alcoholic beverages are sold.
- October 8: Total S.A., Gaz de France and Sonatrach announced a joint venture in the oil fields located in southwest Algeria. The gas fields of In-Salah are among the few sites worldwide which use sequestration technology to bury CO_{2} in deep layers instead of releasing it into the atmosphere.
- October 12: Somali pirates who have held an Algerian bulk carrier since January 1, 2011, released two of its twenty-seven crewmen.
- October 31: Construction was completed on the long anticipated metro. Building began twenty-eight years ago but was halted due to an oil crisis, and then a decade of civil unrest.

=== November ===
- November 2: Azerbaijan President Ilham Aliyev congratulated Bouteflika on Algeria's public holiday A-Anniversary of the Revolution.
- November 8: Terrorist activities have escalated in Kabylie since April 2011. The majority of terrorist attacks in Algeria have occurred there. Kabyls make up the largest number of Algerian Berbers.
- November 17: Algerian crew members, held hostage by Somali pirates since January 2011, were repatriated to Algeria on November 14 . They arrived in Algiers on a special flight from Kenya.
- November 18: President Bouteflika dismissed Noureddine Cherouati, managing director of Sonatrach. He appointed Abdelhamid Zerguin, head of the Sonatrach subsidiary in Lugano, Switzerland, to take Cherouati's place.
- November 21: Henry Ensher has been nominated to be the United States ambassador to Algeria. Ensher is a career member of the US senior foreign service.

=== December ===
- December 12: Islamists in Algeria are hoping to triumph in elections in the spring of 2012. They have been encouraged by the successes of other Islamists throughout North Africa.
- December 15: Bouteflika's health is a concern after the president failed to deliver a traditional speech marking the beginning of the academic year. Instead, a copy of the speech was distributed to journalists.
- December 16: Algerian lawmakers passed a controversial new media law which opponents believe will restrict journalists' freedom. Specifically, the law imposes sanctions on journalists who attempt to compromise Algeria's national identity, sovereignty, economy, and security. Fines up to $3,900 and prison terms will be levied on offenders.
- December 29: Scientists in Algeria have identified four poisonous plants native to the Sahara Desert which can be used to kill the fungus which causes Bayoud disease in date palm trees.
- December 30 : Riots in Algeria in early 2011 were a result of social problems, i.e. poor housing, unemployment, and a paucity of medical services. In contrast to protests in Tunisia and Egypt, in which governments were toppled, Algerian uprisings were not politically motivated. Bouteflika is not despised as were Hosni Mubarek and other Arab leaders, by his own people.
