= 2022 in Algeria =

- Decades: 2000s; 2010s; 2020s
- See also: History of Algeria; List of years in Algeria

Events in the year 2022 in Algeria.

== Incumbents ==
- President: Abdelmadjid Tebboune
- Prime Minister: Aymen Benabderrahmane

== Events ==
Ongoing – COVID-19 pandemic in Algeria

- 5 February – 2022 Algerian Council of the Nation elections
- 7 March – French forces confirm reports that they killed Algerian-born senior al-Qaeda official Yahia Djouadi in a drone strike in February.
- 12 April – Algerian authorities accuse Morocco of attacking an Algerian vehicle convoy on Sunday.
- 26 May – Italian fossil fuel company Eni signs an agreement with Algerian state-owned company Sonatrach to both explore up to 3 billion cubic meters of gas and launch a pilot green hydrogen project in the Algerian desert. The agreement comes as Italy looks to decrease its dependence on Russian gas in light of the Russian invasion of Ukraine.
- 8 June – Algeria suspends a 20-year friendship treaty with Spain, and bans all imports from Spain, amid a disagreement over the Spanish government's position on the disputed Western Sahara.
- 26 July – Algerian Foreign Minister Ramtane Lamamra indicates support for Syria to return to the Arab League after a decade-long suspension.
- 17 August – Twenty-six people are killed by wildfires in Algeria, mostly in the city of El Taref.
- 18 August – 2022 European and Mediterranean wildfires: The death toll from wildfires in Algeria increases to 38 with 200 others suffering from burns and respiratory problems. Firefighters are still trying to contain 39 forest fires in the north of the country, according to officials.
- 13 October – Rival Palestinian factions sign an agreement in Algiers, Algeria, aimed at resolving over 15 years of discord. The agreement is signed by senior Fatah leader Azzam al-Ahmad, Hamas political chief Ismael Haniyeh, Popular Front for the Liberation of Palestine general secretary Talal Naji, and leaders and representatives of 14 other factions, and calls for legislative and presidential elections to be held in Palestine within one year.
- 7 November – Algeria formally applies to join the BRICS economic group.
- 14 November – Sixteen people are killed, and three others are injured after a road accident in Bordj Badji Mokhtar.
- 24 November – 2021 Algeria wildfires: A court in Algeria sentences 49 people to death for the lynching of a 38-year-old man during last year's wildfires, after the man turned himself to police on suspicion of arson.

== Sports ==
- 2022 African Judo Championships
- 2022 Mediterranean Games

== Deaths ==
- 3 January – Kamel Lemoui, 82, football player and manager.
- 5 January – Mohamed Hilmi, 90, actor and director.
- 9 January – Abdelkrim Kerroum, 85, footballer
- 15 January – Michelle Grangaud, 80, Algerian-born French poet
- 31 January – Abdelkarim Badjadja, 76, archivist and historian
- 2 February –
  - Djilali Abdi, 78, footballer
  - Hamid Zouba, 86, football player and manager
- 6 February – Abdelmalek Ali Messaoud, 66, footballer
- 3 April – Yamina Bachir, 68, film director
- 13 May – Karim Djoudi, 63, politician
- 16 May – Faouzi Mansouri, 66, footballer
- 20 May – Ahmed Benaissa, 78, actor
- 10 June – Billel Benhammouda, 24, footballer
- 17 June – Sid Ahmed Ferroukhi, 54, politician
- 10 July – Chantal Gallia, 65, Algerian-born French singer and humorist
- 12 July – Zahia Mentouri, 74–75, physician and government official, minister of health and social affairs
- 6 August – Boudjemaa Talai, 70, politician, MP (2017–2019) and transport minister (2015–2017).
- 16 August – Bachir Yellès, 100, painter.
- 13 September – Abderrahmane Mehdaoui, 72, footballer
- 3 November – Sadek Hadjeres, 94, politician
- 20 November – Djamel-Eddine Houhou, 88, diplomat and politician
- 29 November – Mohamed Betchine, 88, military officer and politician
- 30 November – Othman Saadi, 91–92, writer, diplomat, and politician
- 4 December – Saïd Chibane, 97, doctor and politician
- 10 December – Aziouz Raïs, 68, chaabi singer.

== See also ==
- COVID-19 pandemic in Africa
- 2020s
- African Union
- Arab League
- al-Qaeda in the Islamic Maghreb
- Islamic State – Algeria Province
