= 2020 in Algeria =

- Decades: 2000s; 2010s; 2020s
- See also: History of Algeria; List of years in Algeria

Events from 2020 in Algeria.

== Incumbents ==
- President: Abdelmadjid Tebboune
- Prime minister: Abdelaziz Djerad

== Events ==
Ongoing – COVID-19 pandemic in Algeria

=== January ===
- January 28 – The Human Rights Watch denounces the arrests of dozens of peaceful dissidents that have occurred since the presidential election in 2019.
- January 30 – Defense forces announce the arrest of a man planning a suicide attack against peaceful protesters.

=== February ===
- February 3 – Tunisian President Kais Saied visits Algeria in his first trip outside the country.
- February 14 – Thousands of Algerians march against corruption and military participation in politics.
- February 25 – The first confirmed case of COVID-19 is reported in Algeria: an Italian man who had arrived on February 17. He was deported back to Italy on February 28.

=== March ===
- March 12 – Schools were locked down due to the spread of COVID-19. Five new cases of COVID-19, including one death, were reported.

=== May ===
- May 14 – Algeria summons Morocco's ambassador to Algiers in protest against when the Moroccan consul in Oran purportedly referred to Algeria as an "enemy country."
- May 20 – Soheib Debaghi, Larbi Tahar, and Boussif Mohamed are sentenced to tough jail terms after Facebook posts are ruled to be potentially damaging to national interest.
- May 28 – Algeria recalls its ambassador to France for consultations after French public television aired documentaries on the anti-government protest movement, one of which contained shots of young people kissing and drinking alcohol.

=== June ===
- June 2 – Opposition leaders of the 2019–20 Algerian protests, Karim Tabbou and Samir Benlarbi, are announced to be freed soon. "President Abdelmadjid Tebboune assured me that he would use his constitutional prerogative to ensure that Tabbou and Benlarbi regain their freedom," Sosiane Djilali of the Jil Jadid party told AFP news agency.

=== October ===
- October 1 – President Abdelmadjid Tebboune meets with U.S. Secretary of Defense Mark Esper to discuss security issues in Libya and the Sahel.

=== December ===
- December 29 – President Abdelmadjid Tebboune returns to Algeria after receiving treatment for COVID-19 in Germany since October.
- December – Over the course of 2020, twenty-one rebel fighters were killed, nine were captured, and eleven surrendered to the army.

== Deaths ==
=== January ===
- January 2 – Mohamed Salah Dembri, politician and former Minister of Foreign Affairs (b. 1938).

=== February ===
- February 19 – Jean Daniel, journalist and founder of L'Obs (b. 1920).

=== March ===
- March 31 – Pierre Bénichou, journalist (b. 1938).

=== June ===
- June 27 – Belaid Abdessalam, politician and former prime minister (born 1928).

=== July ===
- July 9 – Mohamed Kouradji, football referee (b. 1952).
- July 17 – Moussa Benhamadi, politician and executive (b. 1953).
- July 23 – Lamine Bechichi, politician (b. 1927).

=== August and September ===
- August 2 – Saïd Amara, football player and manager (b. 1933).
- August 3 – M'hamed Benredouane, politician (b. 1950).
- August 4 – Jean-Paul Grangaud, doctor and professor (b. 1938).
- August 9
  - Rachid Belhout, football player and manager (b. 1944).
  - Nouria Kazdarli, actress (b. 1921).
- September 1 – François Lalande, 89, Algerian-born French actor (Herbie Goes to Monte Carlo, French Postcards, Dangerous Liaisons).
- September 5 – Frédéric Musso, 79, Algerian-born French writer and poet.
- September 10 – Pierre Nahon, 84, Algerian-born French art collector and gallery owner.
- September 17 – Hassan Achour, 82, football player (CR Belouizdad, national team) and manager (Chéraga).
- September 21 – Hamdi Benani, 77, musician and singer; COVID-19.

=== October to December ===
- November 1 – Ali El Kenz, 74, writer and sociologist.
- November 5 – Lakhdar Bouregaa, 87, independentist militant; COVID-19.
- November 7 – Abdelkader Guerroudj, 92, political activist.
- November 25 – Saïd Bouhadja, 82, politician, President of the People's National Assembly (2017–2018).
- November 27 – Kamel Madoun, handball player and coach (NA Hussein Dey, Oman Club, national team).
- December 1 – Henri Teissier, 91, French-Algerian Roman Catholic prelate, Archbishop of Roman Catholic Archdiocese of Algiers (1988–2008); stroke.
- December 14 – Lamine Khene, 89, politician.
- December 18 – Yazid Zerhouni, 83, Tunisian-born Algerian politician.
- December 24 – Mouloud Achour, 76, writer.

== See also ==
- COVID-19 pandemic in Africa
- 2020 in North Africa
- 2020s
- African Union
- Arab League
- al-Qaeda in the Islamic Maghreb
- Islamic State – Algeria Province
