= 1960 in Algeria =

- Decades: 1940s; 1950s; 1960s; 1970s; 1980s
- See also: History of Algeria; List of years in Algeria

1960 in Algeria:

== Incumbents ==
- Head of State: Benyoucef Benkhedda

== Births ==
- January 24: Mohamed Ouamar Ghrib, Algerian footballer
- February 22: Antar Osmani, Algerian footballer
- February 29: Khaled, Algerian raï musician
- April 25: Hocine Yahi, Algerian footballer
