= 2012 in Algeria =

- Decades: 1990s; 2000s; 2010s; 2020s
- See also: History of Algeria; List of years in Algeria

Events from the year 2012 in Algeria

== Incumbents ==
- President: Abdelaziz Bouteflika
- Prime Minister: Ahmed Ouyahia (until September 3), Abdelmalek Sellal (starting September 3)

=== January ===
- January 8: Fateh Rebai, leader of the Algeria opposition Ennahda Party, says that members of the party believe Turkish claims that the French army massacred Algerian citizens during the colonial period in Algeria.
- January 8: The Algerian government will take over mobile phone operator Djezzy, a firm which was owned by the Egyptian company Orascom. Algeria will have a 51% stake in Djezzy, which was also once the property of Vimpelcom of Russia.
- January 10: ArcelorMittal, a multinational firm which owns 70% of the El Hadjar steelworks in eastern Annaba, filed bankruptcy papers. However, Algerian prime minister Ahmed Ouyahia, says the government will not allow the closure of the steelworks.
- January 11: Chadli Bendjedid resigned as president of Algeria on January 11, making the announcement on live television.
- January 17: A governor of an Algerian desert region, which borders Libya, was kidnapped. Armed men representing Al Qaeda in the Islamic Maghreb, took Mohamed Laid Khelfi hostage, after detaining a convoy in which he was traveling, Khelfi is the governor of the Illizi region.
- January 19: Algeria's interior minister stated that Al Qaeda in the Islamic Maghreb did not kidnap Mohamed Khelfi. He was smuggled across the border with Libya prior to being released on January 17. Some Algerian newspapers reported that the kidnappers were linked to Aqim.
- January 23: A court in Algeria sentenced fugitive Al Qaeda leader Mokhtar Belmokhtar and three of his followers to death for attacks against the Algerian military. Six more suspected members of Al Qaeda in the Islamic Maghreb (AQIM), also fugitives, received sentences ranging from two to twenty years.

=== February ===
- February 25: United States Secretary of State Hillary Clinton warned against reversing the course of the 2011 Arab Spring. She encouraged countries in the Middle East and North Africa to work to fulfil the promise of democratic transformations.
- February 28: Algeria signed a deal with China State Construction Engineering Corporation (CSCEC) to build a mosque, which will be the third largest in the world, upon its completion. A unique structure, it will overlook the seafront on the east side of Algiers.
- February 29: President Abdelaziz Bouteflika initiated several measures to calm discontent, bringing an end to the Algerian civil war in 1999. He offered amnesty to rebels who "repented". These people were responsible for 200,000 deaths in Algeria during the 1990s. Algeria now feels somewhat insulated from the Arab Spring movement because of his actions.

=== March ===
- March 2: A Chinese company will construct a mega-mosque which will be located on twenty hectares of land in the Mohammadia section of Algiers.
- March 10: Algeria will assist Libya with creating an army and police force according to foreign minister Mourad Medelci. The news was announced three days after Medelci visited Tripoli, Libya.
- March 19: An Algerian Islamist alliance has vowed to boycott upcoming parliamentary elections if it finds any evidence of fraud.
- March 27: His Highness Mohammed bin Rashid Al Maktoum, Vice President and Prime Minister of the UAE, received Algerian justice minister, Tayib Belaiz. Belaiz communicated the greetings of President Bouteflika at the meeting in Dubai.
- March 28: The father of an Algerian-born 23-year-old who went on a shooting spree in southern France, wants his son's body returned to Algeria for burial. Mohammed Merah, who killed three Jewish schoolchildren, a rabbi, and three paratroopers early in March, was separated from his wife. Merah experienced psychological difficulties and claimed that he had links to al Qaeda. His body will be sent from Toulouse, France to Algeria for burial on March 29.

=== April ===
- April 2: Although harvest season has arrived, Algerian consumers find potatoes, one of the country's primary dishes, inaccessible price wise. The price of potatoes exceeded 100 Algerian dinars (1.35 dollars) per kilogram. In February the price was just 45 dinars or 0.6 dollars.
- April 3: Economists believe that on paper Algeria looks like a country which is very ripe for revolution. However, the Algerian government has worked to dispel discontent through economic incentives, i.e. subsidies for basic consumer goods.
- April 5: President Bouteflika met General Carter Ham, who heads AFRICOM, the U.S. Command for Africa. They discussed the security issue in Mali. The United States fears that Al Qaeda-linked Islamists are turning Mali into an outlaw nation.
- April 11: Ahmed Ben Bella dies. Ahmed Ben Bella was president of Algeria from 1963 until he was overthrown in a military coup led by Colonel Houari Boumedienne, in 1966. He was placed under house arrest until 1980. Then he entered into self-exile in Switzerland, before he returned to Algeria in 1990. He was 95.
- April 12: Algerian President Bouteflika declared a mourning period of eight days for former president and revolutionary leader Ahmed Ben Bella.

=== May ===
- May 12: Abou Djara Soltani, leader of the Islamist Movement For Society of Peace Party, expressed disappointment with results of Algeria's legislative elections. Algeria's main ruling party captured almost half of the seats in the election. The independent daily, El Watan, described the election as "The Status Quo".
- May 21: On the 50th anniversary of the conclusion of the French–Algerian War (1954–1962), on March 19, French news site OWNI and Algerian newspaper El Watan launched a collaborative application, Memories of Algeria (Mémoires d'Algérie), which allows people an opportunity to view the history of the war themselves.

=== June ===
- June 2: The May 10 parliamentary elections were marked by low turnout and electoral successes for two pro-government parties. Islamist parties showed rather poorly.
- June 22: A joint venture between Algeria and Renault will be final within two or three months. Located in western Algeria, the plant will produce cars for the Algerian market.

=== July ===
- July 6: Since its independence from France in 1962, Algeria has concentrated on industry as a driving force for development. This is especially true of its establishment of industrial hubs designed for the quick acquisition of technology.
- July 10: Qatar and Algeria signed a Memorandum of Understanding (MoU) to bring about the construction of an iron and steel factory. Its location will be the industrial region of Bellara in Jijel state.
- July 21: Rossella Urru, freed humanitarian aid worker, offered testimony before Roman prosecutors. She was questioned regarding her kidnapping in Algeria by Islamic rebels in October 2011.

=== August ===
- August 2: Algeria plans to offer tax incentives to foreign investors to encourage investment in its shale energy resources. The government also intends to offer sharing of costs and risks to lure investors.
- August 9: An Irish oil exploration group, Petroceltic, announced that its Ain Tsila natural gas field is commercial. The area is in the Illizi Basin of Algeria.
- August 11: Algerian protestors in several of the nation's regions amassed in the streets to protest recurrent blackouts, which have exacerbated the problem of dealing with the intense summer heat.

=== September ===
- September 1: Forces of the military clashed with members of Al Qaeda in the Islamic Maghreb in Jebel Djerrah, in the Beni Amrane area of Boumerdes province. Soldiers killed ten AQIM militants, including Boubeker Zammouri, 29, a chief.
- September 3: Algerian authorities seized cannabis with a street value estimated at $1.6 million Euros near the north African nation's border with Morocco. Officials pursued an auto which was abandoned by its driver near Tlemcen.

=== December ===
- December 31: Algeria's ruling party, National Liberation Front (FLN), conceded its ruling majority after a partial election in the Algerian senate. The FLN has a ruling majority in the lower house of parliament, controlling 208 of 462 seats. The FLN won only 17 of 48 seats which were submitted in a vote.
