= 2003 in Algeria =

- Decades: 1980s; 1990s; 2000s; 2010s; 2020s
- See also: History of Algeria; List of years in Algeria

The following lists events that happened during 2003 in Algeria.

== Incumbents ==
- Abdelaziz Bouteflika – President

== Events ==
=== May ===
- May 21 – The 6.8 Mw Boumerdès earthquake affected coastal Algeria with a maximum Mercalli intensity of X (Extreme), leaving 2,266 dead and 10,261 injured.
- May 27 – A destructive aftershock of the Boumerdès earthquake affected the Algiers-Boumerdes-Reghaia area with a maximum intensity of VI (Strong), leaving nine dead and 200 injured.
