= 1993 in Algeria =

- Decades: 1970s; 1980s; 1990s; 2000s; 2010s
- See also: History of Algeria; List of years in Algeria

Events in the year 1993 in Algeria

== Incumbents ==
- President – Ali Kafi
- Prime Minister – Belaid Abdessalam (until 21 August), then Redha Malek

== Events ==
- 14 December – Hidroelektra workers massacre: 12 people are murdered by Islamic militants at a construction site.
- Tlemcen National Park is established.

== Deaths ==
- 21 August – Kasdi Merbah, politician
