= 2017 in Algeria =

- Decades: 1990s; 2000s; 2010s; 2020s
- See also: History of Algeria; List of years in Algeria

Events in the year 2017 in Algeria.

== Incumbents ==
- President: Abdelaziz Bouteflika
- Prime Minister:
  - until 25 May: Abdelmalek Sellal
  - 25 May – 15 August: Abdelmadjid Tebboune
  - starting 16 August: Ahmed Ouyahia

== Events ==
- 4 May – scheduled date for the Algerian legislative election, 2017

== Deaths ==
- 26 January – Bakhti Belaïb, politician (b. 1953).
- 6/7 February – Smail Hamdani, politician, former Prime Minister of Algeria (b. 1930).
- 11 February – Danièle Djamila Amrane-Minne, political activist, academic and writer (b. 1939).
