= 1992 in Algeria =

- Decades: 1970s; 1980s; 1990s; 2000s; 2010s
- See also: History of Algeria; List of years in Algeria

Events from the year 1992 in Algeria

== Incumbents ==
- President – Chadli Bendjedid (until 11 January), then Abdelmalek Benhabyles (until 14 January), then Mohamed Boudiaf (until 29 June), then Ali Kafi
- Prime Minister – Sid Ahmed Ghozali (until 8 July) then Belaid Abdessalam

== Events ==
- 4 January – The National People's Assembly is dissolved.
- January – Mohamed Boudiaf invited to become the president of Algeria, backed by the military.
- 9 February – Algerian Civil War: State of emergency announced by the government.
- 4 March – Islamic Salvation Front banned by the Court of Appeal.
- 26 August – A terrorist attack at Houari Boumedienne Airport kills 9 people and injures 128.
- 29 June – President Mohamed Boudiaf is assassinated.

== Births ==
- 25 February – Zahia Dehar, lingerie designer
- 7 May – Abdelmalik Lahoulou, athlete

== Deaths ==
- 29 June – Mohamed Boudiaf, politician (born 1919)
