= 1995 in Algeria =

- Decades: 1970s; 1980s; 1990s; 2000s; 2010s
- See also: History of Algeria; List of years in Algeria

Events from the year 1995 in Algeria.

== Incumbents ==
- President: Liamine Zéroual
- Prime Minister: Mokdad Sifi (until 31 December), Ahmed Ouyahia (starting 31 December)

== Births ==
- January 8 – Laldja Bendahmane, volleyball player
- April 2 – Abdou Nef, footballer (died 2013)
- August 10 - Saïd Benrahma, footballer
