= 2018 in Algeria =

- Decades: 1990s; 2000s; 2010s; 2020s
- See also: History of Algeria; List of years in Algeria

Events in the year 2018 in Algeria.

== Incumbents ==
- President: Abdelaziz Bouteflika
- Prime Minister: Ahmed Ouyahia

== Events ==
- 11 April – the 2018 Algerian Air Force Il-76 crash: An Algerian military transport aircraft crashed shortly after take-off from Boufarik Airport. All 257 people on board were killed, making the accident the deadliest air crash in Algeria.
- October – Prime Minister Ahmed Ouyahia announced that Algeria would ban the burka at the Workplace.

== Deaths ==
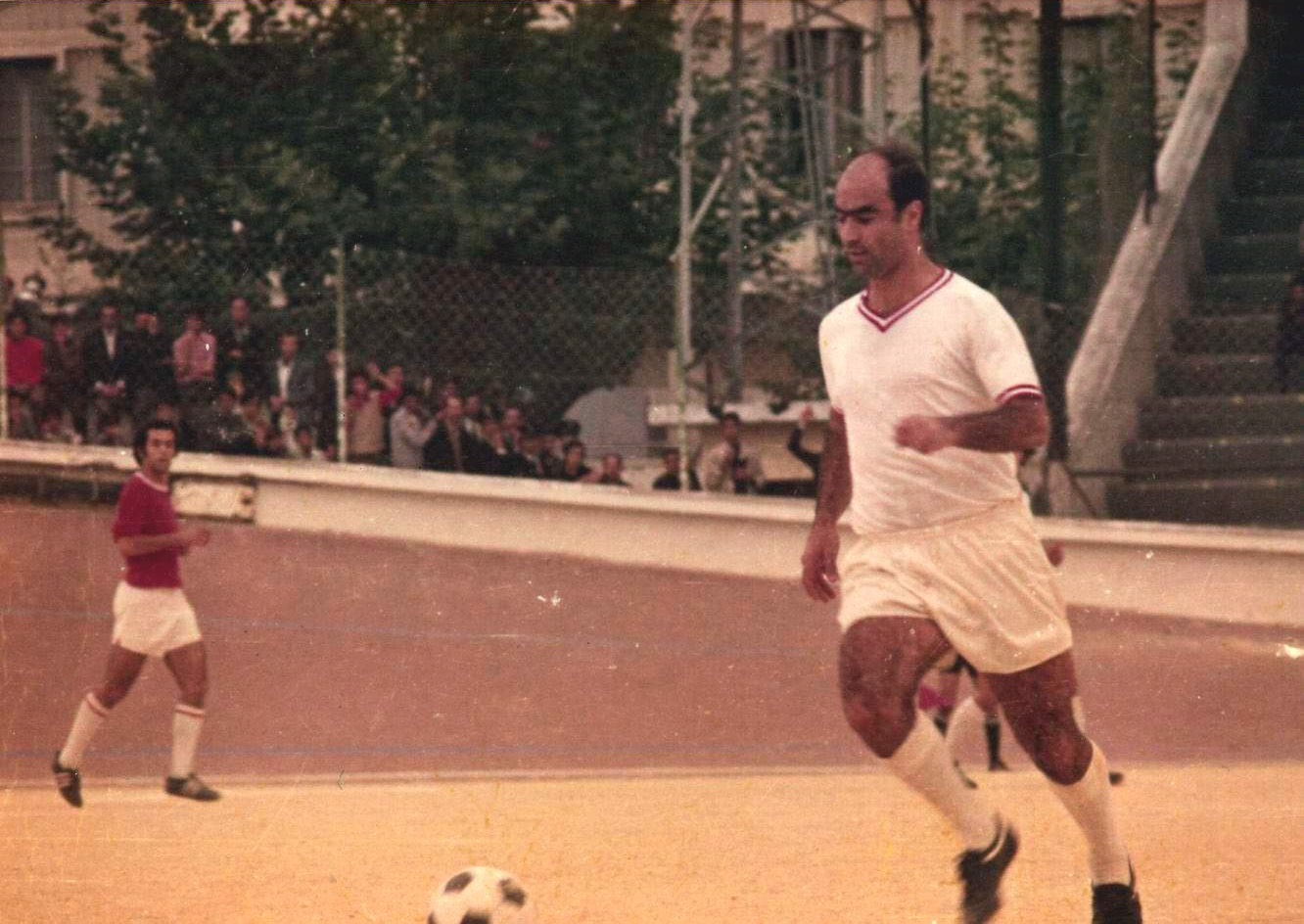
Hacène Lalmas in 1967

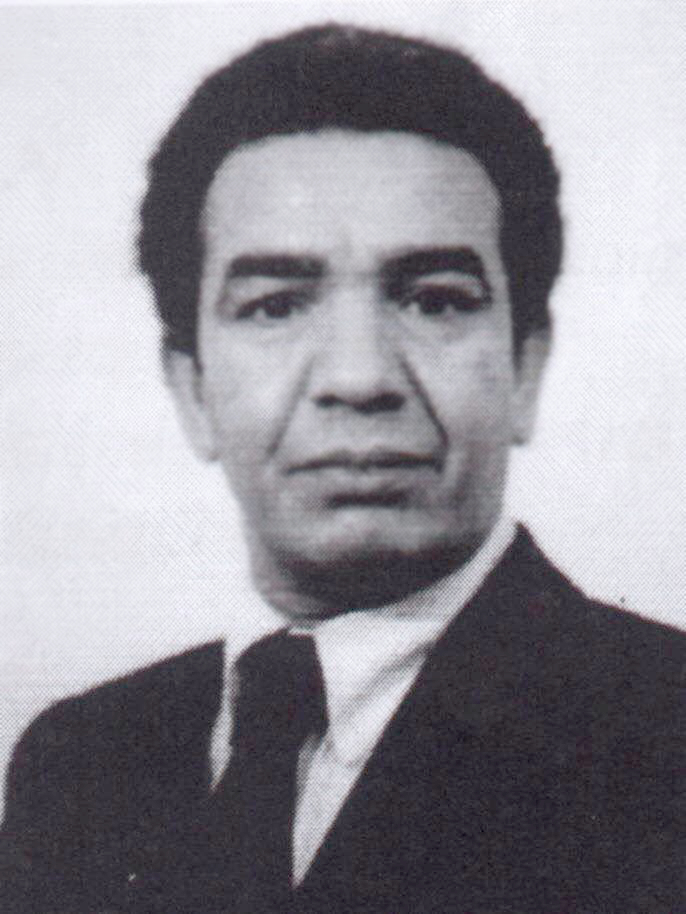
Abdelkhader Houamel

- 7 July – Hacène Lalmas, footballer (b. 1943).
- 11 July –Abdelkhader Houamel, painter (b. 1936).
- 15 August – Abu Bakr al-Jazaeri, Islamic scholar and writer (b. 1921).
- 16 August – Mohamed Demagh, sculptor (b. 1930).
- 12 September – Rachid Taha, singer (b. 1958).
- 20 September – Mohamed Sahnoun, diplomat (b. 1931).
- 14 October – Ahmed Boustila, military officer (b. 1944).
- 28 December – Abdelmalek Benhabyles, politician (b. 1921).
