= 2013 in Algeria =

- Decades: 1990s; 2000s; 2010s; 2020s
- See also: History of Algeria; List of years in Algeria

Events from the year 2013 in Algeria:

== Incumbents ==
- President: Abdelaziz Bouteflika
- Prime Minister: Abdelmalek Sellal

== Events ==
- 16–19 January – Al-Qaeda-linked terrorists take over 800 people hostage at the Tigantourine gas facility near "In Amenas" in the In Amenas hostage crisis.
- 16–30 March – 2013 African U-20 Championship, the 19th African Youth Championship was held in Algeria, with Egypt winning, and going on to the 2013 FIFA U-20 World Cup.
- 5 December – High-level Al-Qaeda leader, Khalil Ould Addah, is killed by the Algerian Army. He had been coming from Mali to a meeting with other al-Qaeda leaders.

== Deaths ==
- 5 November – Abdou Nef, 18, footballer (born 1995)
- 5 December – Khalil Ould Addah, high-level Al-Qaeda leader
