= 2019 in Algeria =

- Decades: 1990s; 2000s; 2010s; 2020s
- See also: History of Algeria; List of years in Algeria

Events from 2019 in Algeria.

== Incumbents ==
- President: Abdelaziz Bouteflika
- Prime Minister:
  - Ahmed Ouyahia (until March 11)
  - Noureddine Bedoui (March 12 – December 19)
  - Sabri Boukadoum, acting (December 19 – December 28)
  - Abdelaziz Djerad (from December 28)

== Events ==
- March 2 – Tens of thousands of Algerians demonstrate in the streets against President Bouteflika's bid for reelection for a fifth term, with 183 injured.
- March 11 – President Bouteflika announces he will not seek a fifth term in office and postpones the election with no date given. Prime Minister Ouyahia also resigns and is replaced by Noureddine Bedoui.
- March 14 – Protests continue as some see the postponement of the election as the President extending his rule.

== Deaths ==
- 23 December – Ahmed Gaid Salah, military chief.
