= 2016 in Algeria =

- Decades: 1990s; 2000s; 2010s; 2020s
- See also: History of Algeria; List of years in Algeria

Events in the year 2016 in Algeria.

== Incumbents ==
- President: Abdelaziz Bouteflika
- Prime Minister of Algeria: Abdelmalek Sellal

== Predicted and scheduled events ==
=== August ===
- August 5–21 – Thirty-eight athletes from Algeria will compete in the 2016 Summer Olympics in Rio de Janeiro, Brazil

== Events ==
=== February ===
- February 7 – Legislative reform was passed that awarded Berber the status of an official language (meaning it can be used in administrative documents).
