= Saïd Chibane =

Algerian politician (1925–2022)

Minister of Religious Affairs and Endowments
- In office 9 September 1989 – 4 June 1991
- Preceded by: Boualem Baki
- Succeeded by: M'hamed Benredouane

Personal details
- Born: 2 April 1925 Chorfa, Algeria, Kabylie
- Died: 4 December 2022 (aged 97)
- Party: Association of Algerian Muslim Ulema
- Education: University of Strasbourg
- Occupation: Professor in Ophthalmology

Saïd Chibane (Arabic: سعيد شيبان; 2 April 1925 – 4 December 2022) was an Algerian doctor and politician. A member of the Association of Algerian Muslim Ulema, he served as Minister of Religious Affairs Endowments from 1989 to 1991.

Chibane died on 4 December 2022, at the age of 97.
