= 2014 in Algeria =

- Decades: 1990s; 2000s; 2010s; 2020s
- See also: History of Algeria; List of years in Algeria

The following lists events that happened during 2014 in Algeria.

== Incumbents ==
- President – Abdelaziz Bouteflika
- Prime Minister –
  - Abdelmalek Sellal (until 13 March)
  - Youcef Yousfi (Acting, 13 March-29 April)
  - Abdelmalek Sellal (from 29 April)

== Events ==
=== February ===
- February 11 – 2014 Algerian Air Force C-130 crash: A military transport plane crashed in a mountainous area of Oum El Bouaghi Province killing 77 people.

=== April ===
- April 17 – Voters in Algeria go to the polls for a presidential election with incumbent President Abdelaziz Bouteflika standing for a fourth term.

=== June ===
- June 25 – Egypt's president Abdel Fattah el-Sisi makes his first official visit abroad to Algeria where security was top of the agenda. Algeria agreed to ship five cargoes of liquefied natural gas to Egypt before the end of the year.

=== August ===
- August 1 – The 5.6 M_{w} Algiers earthquake affected the north coast, causing 420 injuries and six deaths.
- August 30 – A Ukrainian Antonov An-12 aircraft with seven people on board crashes in the Sahara Desert.

=== September ===
- September 24 – Algerian jihadist group Jund al-Khilafah release a video showing French tourist Hervé Gourdel being killed because of French participation in airstrikes against ISIS.
