= 2015 in Algeria =

- Decades: 1990s; 2000s; 2010s; 2020s
- See also: History of Algeria; List of years in Algeria

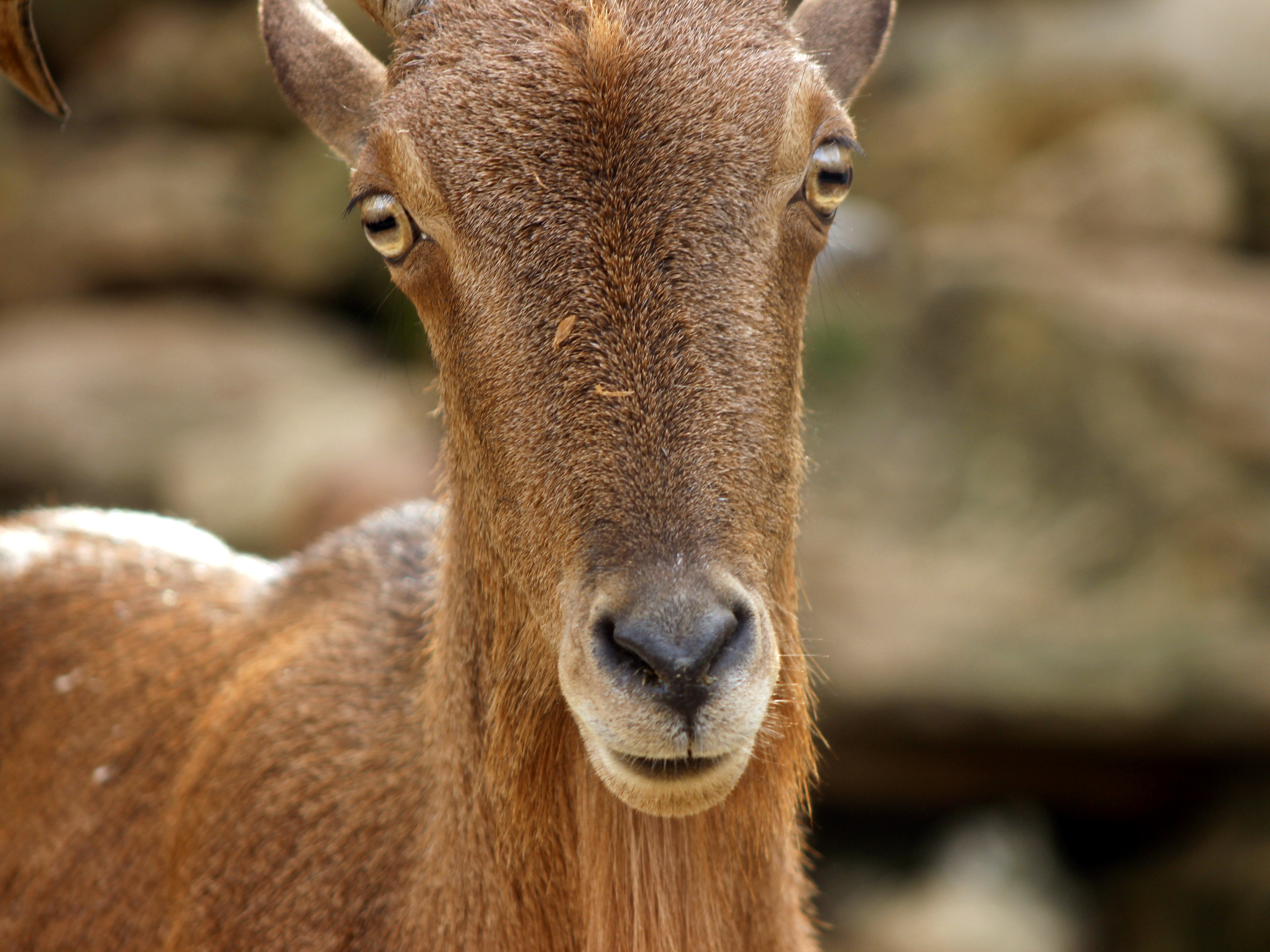
Bisque Wonder

The following lists events that happened during 2015 in Algeria.

== Incumbents ==
- President: Abdelaziz Bouteflika
- Prime Minister : Abdelmalek Sellal

== Events ==
=== January ===
- January 8-16 – 2015 UNAF U-23 Tournament

== Deaths ==
- 6 February – Assia Djebar, 78, novelist, translator and filmmaker
- 5 July – Abderrahmane Soukane, 78, footballer
