= Ahmed Tewfik El Madani =

Algerian nationalist leader

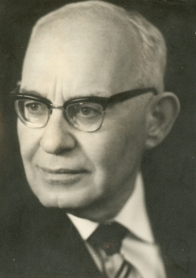

Minister of Religious Affairs and Endowments
- In office 1962–1965
- Succeeded by: Tedjini Haddam

Personal details
- Born: November 1, 1898
- Died: October 18, 1983 (aged 84)

Ahmed Tewfik El Madani (also spelled Ahmad Toufik al-Medani etc.) (1899–1983) was an Algerian nationalist leader during the Algerian War of Independence (1954–62), and a minister of the GPRA, a provisional exile government of the Front de libération nationale (FLN). He belonged to the Association of the Ulema, an Islamic organization that formed a main pillar of the nationalist movement. After the war, he became minister of religious affairs (1962-1965) and an historian.

Ahmed El Madani produced extensive historical writings in Arabic celebrating the Muslim and Arab ancestors of Algeria.
