= Jean-Paul Grangaud =

Algerian pediatrician (1938–2020)

- Born: 7 February 1938; Algiers, French Algeria
- Died: 4 August 2020 (aged 82); Algiers, Algeria
- Occupations: Professor; Pediatrician

Jean-Paul Grangaud (7 February 1938 – 4 August 2020) was an Algerian pediatrician and university professor.

== Biography ==
At the age of 24, Grangaud began practicing medicine at the Hôpital El Kettar in Algiers. He joined the National Liberation Front during the Algerian War, and supplied the soldiers with medicines.

After Algeria gained independence, Grangaud became a member of the commission on health responsible for national immunization. He became a naturalized Algerian citizen in the 1970s. In 1994, he was appointed to the Ministry of Health as an advisor. He was appointed as director of preventative medicine in 2002. In addition to his public career, he served as a professor at the University of Algiers.

Grangaud was the first winner of the Prix Tedjini Haddam from the Académie algérienne d'allergologie.
