= Sassi Lamouri =

Algerian politician (1940–2023)

Sassi Lamouri (Arabic: ساسي لعموري; 1940 – 25 March 2023), also transliterated as Laamouri, was the Algerian minister for religious affairs in the 1992 government of Belaid Abdessalam.

== Life and career ==
Lamouri was born in 1940 in Mila, Algeria. He joined the National Liberation Army of Algeria (ALN) in the historic Wilaya II, before being imprisoned from 1957 to 1962.

He was Minister of Religious Affairs and Wakfs in 1992 in the government of Sid Ahmed Ghozali then in that of Mokdad Sifi in 1994.
