= 1962 in Algeria =

- Decades: 1940s; 1950s; 1960s; 1970s; 1980s
- See also: History of Algeria; List of years in Algeria

1962 in Algeria:

== Incumbents ==
- Head of State:
  - until 22 July: Benyoucef Benkhedda
  - 22 July-25 September: Abderrahmane Farès
  - starting 25 September: Ferhat Abbas
- Prime Minister: Ahmed Ben Bella (starting 27 September)

== Events ==
This was the year that Algeria's revolution against French colonization officially ended after the peace talks in March of that year between the NLF (National Liberation Front) and the French government. This was followed by a ceasefire called between the NLF and the OAS, a secret army determined to keep Algeria a French colony, which was what officially ended the fighting.

=== July ===
- 1 July: the Algerian Évian Accords referendum, 1962

=== September ===
- 26 September: the Algerian legislative election, 1962

== Births ==
- January 21: Ali BenHalima (Algerian international footballer)
- February 2: Mustapha Moussa (Algerian boxer)
- February 5: Chaba Fadela (an Algerian raï musician and actress)
