= El Wa3ra =

- Promotional poster for the series
- Also known as: El Waara
- Genre: Reality television; hidden camera; comedy
- Created by: Rym Ghazali
- Written by: Rym Ghazali; Chemseddine Lamrani
- Directed by: Chemseddine Lamrani
- Starring: Rym Ghazali; Chemseddine Lamrani
- Theme music composer: Studio Padidou
- Opening theme: Freeklane
- Country of origin: Algeria
- Original language: Arabic
- No. of seasons: 1
- No. of episodes: 20 (televised); 24 (online)

Production
- Producer: Rym Ghazali
- Camera setup: Multiple
- Running time: 10–15 minutes
- Production company: Rym Ghazali Productions

Original release
- Network: Echorouk TV
- Release: May 27 – June 15, 2017

El Wa3ra, sometimes written El Waara (Arabic: الواعرة, translated as The Tricked), is an Algerian hidden camera pranking television series, created and produced by Rym Ghazali, and starring Ghazali herself alongside Chemseddine Lamrani. It airs every day during Ramadan, starting May 27, 2017, on Echorouk TV.

== Background ==
The series is presented by Algerian singer, actress, TV presenter and producer Rym Ghazali, alongside the YouTuber Chemseddine Lamrani, better known as DZjoker.

The idea of the program is to invite guests to different locations, and record them on hidden camera while they get in a frightening situation. The show mixes the actual images with scenes in which the participant views the hidden camera footage and comments on it.

According to Media & Market Research (MMR) agency, El Wa3ra is the most watched program during the 2017 Ramadan season. It is also considered by people and some media as "the best comic program" broadcast on Echorouk TV in Ramadan 2017, in terms of content.

The series is also viewed in Tunisia and Morocco, and by Maghrebis who are living in France. This success comes, according to Al Watan Voice, from the creativity in the various scenes filmed in Algeria, especially in the Algerian Desert, in addition to the participation of leading Algerian media and drama figures.

== Episodes ==
No.	Guest	Activity	Original release date
1	Hassiba Amrouche	Singer	May 27, 2017
2	Cheb Toufik	Singer	May 28, 2017
3	Mourad Khan	Actor	May 29, 2017
4	Redouane Bila Hodoud	Comedian	May 30, 2017
5	Reda City 16	Rapper	May 31, 2017
6	Houssine	N/A	June 1, 2017
7	Naouel Scander	Singer	June 2, 2017
8	Ramzi	N/A	June 3, 2017
9	Atika Tobal	Actor	June 4, 2017
10	Mister AB	Rapper	June 5, 2017
11	Chemseddine Abacha	Singer	June 6, 2017
12	Cheb Mazi	Singer	June 7, 2017
13	Chef Karim	Chef	June 8, 2017
14	Tir El Hadi	Actor	June 9, 2017
15	Moufida Addas	Comedian	June 10, 2017
16	Mohamed El Khames Zeghdi	Singer	June 11, 2017
17	Naima Ababsa	Singer	June 12, 2017
18	Ryad Benamor	Journalist	June 13, 2017
19	Bilel Milano	Singer	June 14, 2017
20	N/A	N/A	June 15, 2017
21	N/A	N/A	June 16, 2017
22	N/A	N/A	June 17, 2017
23	N/A	N/A	June 18, 2017
24	N/A	N/A	June 19, 2017
