= Rym Ghezali =

Algerian actress (1982–2021)

- Born: 29 June 1982; Algiers, Algeria
- Died: 17 March 2021 (aged 38); Paris, France
- Occupations: Actress, singer
- Years active: 2005–2021
- Spouse: Nabil bin Nasser
- Relatives: Selma Ghezali (sister)

Rym Ghezali (Arabic: ريم غزالي; 29 June 1982 – 17 March 2021) was an Algerian actress and singer. She was known for creating the television series El Wa3ra.

== Biography ==
Ghezali participated in Star Academy 3 in 2005. She created and produced El Wa3ra. in 2017, then acted in Boqron in 2018. She suffered several years ago from cancer, and had to remove a tumor from the brain after an urgent surgery to save her from losing memory and vision as a result of the tumor, which was a successful operation, but the disease returned to penetrate her brain and body and she entered a hospital in Paris in April 2019, and announced her illness in November 2019 and she remained in the hospital until her health deteriorated in the last month.

She died in Paris, France, on 17 March 2021, aged 38, suffering from cancer since 2019.
