= Dans le silence, je sens rouler la terre =

2010 documentary film

- Directed by: Mohamed Lakhdar Tati
- Screenplay by: Mohamed Lakhdar Tati
- Produced by: Stella Productions
- Cinematography: Sylvie Petit
- Edited by: Julie Durré
- Music by: Mohamed Zami
- Release date: 2010
- Running time: 52 minutes
- Countries: Algeria; France

Dans le silence, je sens rouler la terre is a 2010 documentary film.

== Synopsis ==
In 1939, the end of the Spanish Civil War forced thousands of men, women and children to flee Francoist Spain. The French administration in Algeria opened refugee camps to take them in. Seventy years later, a young Algerian investigates the past. Despite the absence of archives and files, the traces of these camps have survived the collective oblivion and still appear in current Algeria.
