= Mohamed Hilmi =

Algerian actor and director (1993–present )

- Born: Mohamed Ameziane Brahimi; 15 February 1931; Azzefoun, Tizi Ouzou, French Algeria, France
- Died: 5 January 2022 (aged 90); Algiers, Algeria
- Occupations: Actor; Director

Mohamed Ameziane Brahimi known as Mohamed Hilmi (15 February 1931 – 5 January 2022) was an Algerian actor and director. He was the brother of actor Saïd Hilmi.

== Life and career ==
Hilmi attended his first show, Diviser pour régner, at the age of 10. He left his hometown of Azzefoun at 13 years old to live in Algiers, where he began working for an insurance company. In 1947, he played a small role in the play Ould Ellil. Mahieddine Bachtarzi would only cast him into small roles, so Hilmi joined Rédha Falaki on the radio in 1949. However, he turned to the screen the following year, writing telefilms, short films, and medium-length films. He acted in his first feature film, El Ouelf Essaib.

In 1950, he returned to the stage. After independence, he wrote a number of song-based sketches and went on to direct TV films, shorts and medium-length features: Chkoune Yassbag, El Ghoumouk, Ec-Chitta, Matfahmine, Listihlak and, above all, L'Après-pétrole (1986). In 1993, he signed his first film, El Ouelf Essaib, and published a satirical comedy entitled Démocra-cirque ou le cri du silence. Parcours miraculeux, an autobiography, and Le présent du passé.

== Death ==
Hilmi died in Algiers on 5 January 2022, at the age of 90.

== Filmography ==
=== Actor ===
- El Ouelf Essaib

=== Director ===
- Chkoune yassbag
- El Ghoumouk
- Ec-Chitta
- Matfahmine
- Listihlak

=== Screenwriter ===
- Démocra-cirque ou le cri du silence
