= 2005 in Algeria =

The following lists events that happened during 2005 in Algeria.

== Incumbents ==
- President: Abdelaziz Bouteflika
- Prime Minister: Ahmed Ouyahia

== Events ==
June 28, 2005 (Tuesday)

- Islamic Studies dropped from secondary school curriculum.
- Six Yemeni guerrillas killed in Algeria last week

June 27, 2005 (Monday)

- Algeria refuses entry to four Moroccan journalists working for the Moroccan Sahara Foundation NGO, expelling them to Rome. The move follows increased Morocco-Algeria tensions over the Western Sahara.

June 26, 2005 (Sunday)

- Joint US-Algerian naval exercises, codenamed "Barbary Thunder", involving such vessels as the USS Nashville.
- General Electric announces plans to build Africa's largest water desalination plant to supply Algiers.

June 25, 2005 (Saturday)

- Amari Saifi ("Abderrezak el-Para), a leading member of the GSPC captured in Chad in October 2004, is sentenced to life imprisonment by a court in Algiers. He failed to turn up to his trial, sparking speculation. (Reuters).

June 24, 2005 (Friday)

- Enforcement of the 2002 partnership agreement between Algeria and the European Union to begin on September 1st, says EU source.
- Finance Minister Mourad Medelci announces plans to cut foreign debt by $1 billion this year "if the positive financial position of the country continues". The debt currently stands at $21.4 billion, having fallen 7.7% over 2004.
