= M'hamed Benredouane =

Algerian politician (1950–2020)

Minister of Religious Affairs
- In office 1991–1992
- Prime Minister: Sid Ahmed Ghozali

Personal details
- Born: 20 August 1950 Bouinan, French Algeria
- Died: 3 August 2020 (aged 69) Algiers, Algeria

M'hamed Benredouane (20 August 1950 – 3 August 2020) was an Algerian politician.

Benredouane worked as a lecturer at Mustapha Pacha hospital in Algiers and was host of the TV program "Avis religieux" on Canal Algérie.

He served as Minister of Religious Affairs under the rule of Sid Ahmed Ghozali from 1991 to 1992. He was a member and once served as Vice-President of the Foundation Emir Abdelkader.
