= 2008 in Algeria =

Events from the year 2008 in Algeria.

== Incumbents ==
- President: Abdelaziz Bouteflika
- Prime Minister: Abdelaziz Belkhadem (until 23 June), Ahmed Ouyahia (starting 23 June)

== Events ==
=== January ===
- January 17: A senior United Nations official stated that the Algerian government refused to close off the streets outside a U.N. building in Algiers despite repeated requests in the months prior to a suicide car bombing in December 2007. The blast killed 17 staff members. Al Qaeda in the Islamic Maghreb took responsibility for the action.

=== February ===
- February 7: Algerian security forces killed a rebel leader and apprehended six of his associates who were suspected in a dual bombing of a court building and United Nations offices in Algiers. They are also wanted for an attack on foreign oil workers.
- February 22: The Algerian militant group, al-Qaeda, kidnapped two Austrian tourists in Tunisia. According to an audio recording released by the faction the people were seized because of western world cooperation with Israel.

=== May ===
- May 9 & May 10: 9 Algerian government troops were killed in two separate incidents by Islamic extremists. 6 died in an ambush carried out by the North Africa wing of Al Qaeda, as the soldiers were patrolling in Medea Province. 3 others were killed by the same group in another incident in Bouira Province. The soldiers' paths were halted by 2 bombs prior to the commencement of gunfire.
- May 15: The Algerian interior minister announced that 115 people were kidnapped in Algeria in terrorist-related actions in 2007. He reported 260 additional kidnappings attributed to family disputes.
- May 18: Hundred of Algerian security forces intervened in Beriane, Algeria following three nights of clashes between Arabs and minority Berbers. 2 people were killed and dozens made homeless after violence involving rival gangs of hooded young men in the town of about 35,000.
- May 19: Russia and Algeria concluded a deal in which the African nation purchased $7.5 billion in arms in return for ceding Russia gas leverage. The agreement is post-Soviet Russia's largest single arms deal. Algeria acquired fighter aircraft, tanks, and air defense systems, with the possibility of more equipment.
- May 20: Algeria resumed a role as mediator in an armed conflict between Tuareg fighters and government troops in north Mali. Malian foreign minister Moctar Ouane held discussions with Algerian president Abdelaziz Bouteflika about the strife which threatens Mali's internal stability.
- May 20: The Moroccan Bar Association, composed of 1,200 members, called for the restoration of diplomatic ties with Algeria and the re-opening of land borders between the two nations, closed since 1994. It is thought that Algerian officials want the settlement of a thirty-three-year-old Western Sahara conflict between Morocco and the national liberation movement Polisario Front, as a precondition to normalization of relations.
- May 21: Algerian state energy conglomerate, Sonatrach, estimated 2008 earnings at $81 billion if oil prices maintain their high level. The 2007 earnings amounted to $59 billion.
- May 22: Algeria became the first country to acquire Runitel, the United States developed information and communications system. It is a component of modernizing the arms and acquisition of the latest technologies.
- May 22: Algerian army troops killed two terrorists in an ambush in the Beni Douala region at Tizi Ouzou. The soldiers acted on information that the terrorists were en route to Beni Douala in a car. Two AK-74 assault rifles were recovered from the dead men.
- May 22: Ghaleb Abdullah Moussa is appointed as the new Catholic Church Archbishop of Algiers by Pope Benedict XVI.
- May 27: A Swiss firm, Algeria Shopping Malls Company, announced plans to build 5 shopping malls in Algerian cities by 2013. The first mall will be in Bab Ezzouar, a new business square in Algiers. A second one will also be located in the capital city, followed by additional ones in Oran, Setif, and Tlemcen.
- May 27: 70 policemen were injured and 150 people were arrested when partisans of Mouloudia of Oran protested their team's relegation to the 2nd division for the first time in its history. Dozens of businesses were destroyed and police clashed with angry fans in the streets.
- May 29: Abdelmalek Sayeh, chairman of the Algerian national office of drug taking and addiction fighting, cited foreign countries as using Algeria's youth for consumption of drugs like heroin and cocaine from Colombia. Sayeh stated that Algerian young people are being used to traffick cannabis from Morocco to Libya, Tunisia, the Middle East, and western and eastern Europe.
- May 30: The Court of Boumerdes sentenced 14 people suspected of terrorism and possession of weapons, ammunition, and explosive materials to death in absentia.

=== June ===
- June 2: The Russian Irkut (company) Corporation delivered 2 Su 30 MKA Flanker multi-role fighters to Algeria. By the terms of a 2006 contract amounting to $2.5 billion, Irkut is scheduled to deliver 28 Su 30 MKA fighters to Algeria by 2010. Irkut is part of Russia's United Aircraft Corporation (UAC).
- June 5: A suicide attack occurred in Bordj El Kiffan, eastern Algiers, in front of the main entrance of the Republican Guards barracks. Nearby a bomb exploded inside a cafe. One person was killed and many others were injured. Observers suspected the two incidents were the work of Al-Qaeda in the Islamic Maghreb A thirty-year-old man carried a bomb belt to the barracks near Matares Beach. He blew himself up two meters in front of the barracks' gate.
- June 5: Six Algerian soldiers were killed and four wounded in Cap Djinet, east of Algiers, when a roadside bomb exploded when their vehicle ran over it, returning to their barracks.
- June 6: Algeria is cited in a United States trafficking in persons report, which specifies it as a transit nation for illegal migrants coming from southern African countries. Often these persons become involved in prostitution networks.
- June 8: Thirteen people were killed at a railway station in Beni Amrane (about sixty miles east of Algiers) when two bombs exploded. The explosives were triggered by a remote control device. The first bomb killed at least two people, including a French citizen who was repairing the station's rails. He was in the process of leaving the area in a car.
- June 8: Algeria's national oil company, Sonatrach, and the Portuguese company, Energias de Portugal (EDP), signed a memorandum to expand their partnership outside the Iberian Peninsula. The companies hope to bring their products to Latin America. Sonatrach owns a 2.035% stake in EDP.
- June 10: Shariket Karhaba Koudiet Edraaouch Spa (SKD), a subsidiary of Sonatrach and Sonelgaz, have said that a consortium of General Electric and Iberdrola of Spain are responsible for the construction of a power station being built in El Taref, 700 kilometers east of Algiers. The project will increase Algeria's energy capacity by 18%.
- June 12: A cooperation agreement sealed by Sonatrach stipulates that a bureau of the Russian oil company, Gazprom, will open in Algiers in June.
- June 12: Air Algérie announced an increase of 15% in wages to become effective by June 2009. The raise for pilots and employees necessitates the allocation of $959 million. Seven trade unions defended the company's employees in negotiations with airline executives.
- June 15: Four people suspected of complicity in the deaths of six Algerian soldiers were arrested in Cap Djinet in the coastal province of Boumerdes, They admitted to attacking an army troops patrol in Cap Djinet on June 5.
- June 15: The president of the pharmaceutical sector in Algeria, Lofti Ben Ahmed, said that Algerian medicines are subject to being smuggled into Morocco and Tunisia even though control measures have been set up at all borders. Medicines imported into Algeria are being sold illegally in Oujda. Medicines are nonrefundable in Morocco because social insurance is nonexistent there.
- June 15: The Algerian navy apprehended twenty-four Algerians attempting to enter Europe by boat from Oran.
- June 16: NATO proposed a unilateral counterterrorism program for Algeria which would include seven hundred troops, with coordination of military and information activities. The training of military officials would be conducted at the defense academy in Rome, Italy.
- June 16: A 2008 people census revealed that there are approximately 35 million people in Algeria, with a growth rate of 1.72% from 1998 to 2008.
- June 17: Three Moroccans affiliated with Al-Qaeda in the Islamic Maghreb were detained three weeks ago and have been transferred to Serkadji prison in Algiers. The three said that they carried arms against the United States as well as working to overthrow the "pro U.S. monarchy" in Morocco. It is unsure whether they will be tried in Algeria or Morocco.
- June 17: An investigative team has been formed to inquire into scandals affecting Algerian hospitals. The committee will submit a detailed report to President Abdelaziz Bouteflika in the coming months. The investigation has been prompted by complaints of poor treatment of patients and bad hospital working conditions.
- June 18: Production workers at Sonatrach threaten an indefinite strike unless their demands for wage increases and other grievances are not met.
- June 18: Algerian Prime Minister Abdelaziz Belkhadem revealed in an interview with Le Monde that his country would object to some provisions of the Union For The Mediterranean Project proposed by Nicolas Sarkozy. One of these was an agreement to normalize relations with Israel. Belkhadem stated that President Bouteflika did not desire a life term and supported democratic elections in which Algerians would be free to select from a number of candidates.
- June 19: Tayeb Louh, Algerian Labour, Employment and Social Security minister, said that there are more than one million unemployed in Algeria and 300,000 new job seekers annually.
- June 21: Algerian security forces killed an armed Islamist near Tizi-Ouzou, in the town of Akaouadj, 110 kilometers east of Algiers. An automatic gun, documents, and ammunition were seized by the government forces.
- June 24: Sultan Bin Saeed Al Mansoori, the head of the Algeria-United Arab Emirates joint committee, said that the Emirates will invest $50 billion in Algeria by 2010. Saeed stated that the Algerian party could determine projects for investment in the agricultural sector in the upcoming years.
- June 25: Algeria is experiencing a shortage of 25 important medicines including those which treat blood pressure, gynecology, and heart disease.
- June 29: Algerian and Palestinian authorities signed a tax exemption agreement in Algiers which favors Palestinian products in a resolution to support the Palestinian economy.
- June 29: The Algerian civil defence announced that the number of professional divers available to the country's beaches would be raised to 500 in the coming years.
- June 29: Houcine Zehouane revealed that Mohamed Boudia supervised a secret organization in Algiers following the military coup which ousted former Algerian president Ahmed Ben Bella. Boudia was prosecuted and forced to leave Algeria to avoid imprisonment. He was murdered by the Israeli Mossad on June 28, 1973. Mossad was assisted by French intelligence. Zehouane spoke at a conference organized by Boudia's sons which was associated with the Art et Culture institution.
- June 30: President Bouteflika donated $150,000 to the Clayton County, Iowa Disaster Relief Committee, to assist the town of Elkader, Iowa in its recovery from the June 2008 flooding. Elkader is named after Emil Abdelkader (1832 - 1847), an Algerian freedom fighter.

=== July ===
- July 1: A court in Oran overturned the 2006 defamation conviction of a reporter and her newspaper supervisor. Salima Tiemcani and Omar Belhouchet were each fined approximately $790 after an investigation into drug trafficking in the western region of Algeria, which was considered defamatory. The overturning of their sentence after an appeal filed on June 7 is a first in the annals of Algerian justice.
- July 2: Mustafa Hamlily, 49, of Bashare, Algeria, and Abdul Raham Hourari, 28, of Algiers, became the first Algerians to be liberated from the Guantanamo Bay detention center since it was opened by the United States Department of Defense in January 2002.
- July 8: Algerian Minister of Communication Abderrachid Boukerzaza announced an increase in government contribution to Company for Housing and low-cost housing construction in Shelter Afrique by $1.5 million, to $4.6 million. Earlier Algeria had contributed $3.1 million.
- July 8: Sonatrach acquired a new LNG tanker named Cheikh Bouamama, which will serve to deliver natural gas to Mediterranean basin markets. It is 75,500 m3 with four reservoirs. It was delivered in Japan in the Universal Shipbuilding yard.
- July 17: The Algerian national gendarmerie announced that there were 11,336 road accidents in the first half of 2008. These accounted for 1,600 deaths and 19,396 injuries. The figures revealed a significant increase in road accidents when compared with the first half of 2007. The mortality rate rose 7.24%, injuries jumped 7.99%, and the number of road accidents went up by 5%.
- July 18: The United States Treasury activated measures to freeze the assets of four Algerians who are believed to be leaders of a group with al Qaeda affiliations. The four are considered to be responsible for bombings which caused deaths in Algeria in June 2008.
- July 22: Oran recently hosted its second annual Arab Film Festival. Algerian producers and critics contend that there is quite a way to go before the Algerian film community returns to the form which produced The Battle of Algiers in the 1960s. However, European film enthusiasts have noticed a revival of the film industry in North Africa.
- July 28: Pied noirs or "black feet", French settlers who left Algeria following its independence in 1962, are returning in large numbers to see the country where they were born and raised.

=== August ===
- August 5: The North African wing of Al Qaeda claimed responsibility for a car bomb which wounded 25 people, including 4 policemen, in Tizi Ouzou. The bomb exploded near a police station. Al Qaeda in the Islamic Maghreb identified the bomber as Makhlouf Abou Mariam. His truck carried 600 kg. of an unspecified explosive.
- August 10: A suicide bombing in Zemmouri Al Bahri killed at least eight people. The coastal town is 45 kilometers from Algiers.
- August 11: Iranian President Mahmoud Ahmadinejad held talks with Bouteflika on ways to expand bilateral relations between Iran and Algeria. Among many issues the two discussed the formation of an OPEC type gas group.
- August 11: The Protestant Church of Algeria [EPA] debated whether to obey government orders which have closed more than fifty Protestant Churches in the country during the past six months.
- August 22: The North African branch of Al Qaeda claimed responsibility for attacks on a police academy, a military barracks, and a Canadian engineering firm. These were retaliatory actions against security forces which had killed a number of young Mujahedeen or holy warriors. Salah Abu Mohammad, an Al Qaeda spokesman, delivered a taped message to the Al Jazeera news channel. The attacks claimed up to sixty lives in Algeria.
- August 30: Islamic militants beheaded a patron of a bootleg bar in the town of Boghni, near Tizi Ouzou on August 29. The terrorists were disguised as police officers and murdered the man because he was a prison guard. Other bar patrons were robbed by the members of the group. An Algerian -born emigrant was kidnapped in an attempt to win ransom. It is uncertain whether the militants targeted the bar because it served alcohol or they just wanted to rob it.

=== September ===
- September 6: United States Secretary of State Condoleezza Rice met with Algeria's foreign minister during her three-day visit to North Africa. The visit came at a time when Algeria was experiencing a surge in terror attacks.
- September 9: SNASCO appointed the Kun Won architecture firm of South Korea to design the SNASCO mega waterfront project in Oran, Algeria.
- September 11: Algerian President Bouteflika congratulated two Algerian judokas after they won gold medals at the 2008 Summer Paralympics.
- September 20: Algerian Prime Minister Ahmed Ouyahia expressed his desire to strengthen strategic cooperation between Algeria and China.
- September 24: Algerian President Bouteflika remained silent regarding his decision on seeking an unprecedented third term.
- September 26: The government of Algeria donated $2 million in aid to Cuba to assist the Cuban people recover from the devastation left following the passage of Hurricane Gustav and Hurricane Ike.
- September 29: A suicide bomber killed three people and injured six in the Dellys area of Boumerdes on Sunday, September 28. The region is thirty miles east of Algiers. The incident occurred at a checkpoint during Iftar.

=== October ===
- October 20: Al Salam Bank began operations in Algeria.
- October 20: Algeria is on course to be among the top three nations in handing down death sentences to criminals in 2008. As of October 20 the nation's courts and tribunals had handed down almost 300 death sentences. In 2007 Algeria sentenced 271 people to death, ranking it 3rd on a list of fifty-one countries.
- October 30: Algerian opposition parties attacked President Bouteflika's plan to change the constitution in order to abolish term limits and achieve a third term in office. Prime Minister Ouyahia said that the amendment would likely be passed by the end of November 2008. A presidential election is likely to be held in April 2009.
- October 30: Abu Dhabi President Sheikh Khalifa bin Zayed Al Nahyan congratulated President Bouteflika in a telegram sent on Algeria Revolution Day.
- October 31: Algerian journalist Noureddine Boukraa was convicted of disclosing confidential information after he reported that security officials might have used their positions for personal gain. Boukraa was sentenced to a three-month suspended jail term and fined $465 for disclosing confidential information of an ongoing investigation. The verdict was delivered by a court in the northeastern Annaba region. The charge came from a November 2007 article in Al-Nahar which was based on multiple sources and documents. Boukraa currently works for Akhbar al-Jazair and planned to file an appeal.

=== November ===
- November 1: Mourad Medelchi of Algeria is one of forty-four foreign ministers meeting in France during a Union por la Mediterrannee (Union for Mediterranean) assembly. The gathering seeks a common plan to end the trust crisis between members who are disputing the Union's positions and structures.
- November 2: A Travelex delegation is expected in Algeria on November 16, 2008. The officials are considering issuing an international payment card, permitting Algerian citizens with foreign currency accounts to obtain money in their own country.
- November 3: The general prosecutor in Oran denied receiving complaints about the use of prison labor in private workshops. Algerian law permits the practice. Prosecutor Saad Allah said that his judicial pole is composed of nine courts. He said that his courts have not received requests from state-owned companies for the use of cheap labor.
- November 4: Car sales in the Algerian auto market decreased by 70% in the last four months. Many of those hoping to purchase a new car are waiting until 2009.
- November 4: Eleven months after thirty-seven people died and one hundred seventy-seven were wounded following twin terrorist attack bombings of the Constitutional Court and the United Nations building in Algiers, a judicial investigation continues. The Court of Algiers has twenty-eight cases to treat in the session which opened on November 3. The primary one, that involving Al Queda in North Africa leader, Abdelmalek Droukdal, will be tried in absentia, by December 2.
- November 4: Algeria announced that it will cut 71,000 daily barrels of its oil exports among the Organization of Petroleum Exporting Countries OPEC. Following a recent meeting the oil cartel agreed to reduce its exports by a collective 1.5 billion barrels (240,000,000 m^{3}) a day, beginning on November 1.
- November 4: Austria has denied paying a ransom to Al Qaeda in the Islamic Maghreb for the release of two hostages, Wolfgang Ebner and Andrea Kloiber. Their release was credited to the efforts of the governments of Algeria and Mali. The victims were held in Mali.
- November 10: Algeria is one of seventeen African nations suffering from severe water shortages. The United Nations Development Program and the World Bank released a report indicating that the distribution of water in Algeria is inefficient. 30% of the water is being wasted because of numerous leaking points.
- November 10: Yazid Zerhouni, Home Affairs Minister of Algeria, visited family members of Fateh Chabaane, former mayor of Timzrit, who was assassinated by terrorists the previous week. Chabaane's death followed the earlier political murders of the head of the municipal people's assembly of Boumerdes and the Wilayat People's Assembly of Tizi Ouzou.
- November 10: Five medical companies monopolize the Algerian medical import business, which amounts to $2 billion annually. The statistic was cited by Minister of Solidarity, Family, and Immigration, Djamel Ould Abes, at a seminar held at the University of Medea.
- November 10: King Abdullah II of Jordan arrived for a visit in Algeria along with a large delegation. He was greeted at the airport by President Bouteflika. Private talks began in Zaralda, the state residence west of Algiers, regarding issues of Arab countries and other common interests.
- November 11: The United States government released two Algerian prisoners from the Guantanamo Bay detention camp, reducing the total number of Algerian prisoners remaining there to twenty-six.
- November 12: The French language daily El Watan reported that Algeria has taken a step backwards in joining the few Arab states which have consented to lifetime presidencies in their constitutions. The Berber opposition denounced the parliamentary vote as a hold up. Le Soir d'Algérie said "Bouteflika treats himself to a third mandate".
- November 16: Argentina President Cristina Fernandez de Kirchner is in Algeria for an economic state visit. The countries are seeking agreements related to the food industry, medicine, and auto and agricultural engines. Increased cooperation in chemicals, iron, steel, construction materials, mining, biotechnology, oil, and gas, are anticipated. The two nations have been joined in a nuclear agreement since 1985.
- November 20: A United States federal judge ordered the release of five Algerians being held at the Guantanamo Bay detention camp. Judge Richard J. Leon found the evidence against the prisoners insufficient to link them to Al Qaeda, because it came from a single source.
- November 20: The Algerian Defense Ministry has ordered 21 fast patrol boats from the French company Ocea. The boats will be used by the Algerian Navy for security missions in the Mediterranean and the Atlantic Ocean.
- November 23: Éric Zemmour, a French journalist for Le Figaro, is being accused of promoting ethnic separatism. Zemmour, born in Paris, France, is from an ethnic Berber family in Algeria, who left Algeria following the Algerian Revolution. His main point seems to be there are different races distinguishable by color.
- November 30: The accounts of four members of al Qaeda in the Islamic Maghreb have been frozen by the United States Treasury Department. Thus far in 2008, 138 cases of money laundering and terror financing have been reported to the Financial Information Treatment Cell (CTRF).
- November 30: The Chairman of the National Office of Drugs Fighting, Abdelamlek Sayeh, said that 18 tons of cannabis and 900 hallucinogenic tablets have been seized in 2008. He added that drug trafficking networks are smuggling drugs to Europe on Algerian boats.

=== December ===
- December 3: A poll published by the independent daily, Liberté, revealed that 49.5% of Algerian men between the ages of 15 and 34 desire to emigrate to England or Europe. More than 80% of those polled cited fleeing Algeria and building a future as motivation for leaving. The poll reported that four out of five Algerians knew someone who had left illegally without the required passports and visas.
- December 8: Algeria pardoned a 51-year-old Dutch drug smuggler. The pardon was issued to coincide with a Muslim holiday for the prophet Abraham. The smuggler, Berry Dovens, was sentenced to life imprisonment in 1993 after he was apprehended at the Moroccan border with 2,400 kilos of hashish in his camper van.
- December 23: Algeria maintains the world's largest carbon capture and storage operation in Salah, Algeria, approximately seven hundred miles south of Algiers. About 800,000 tons of carbon dioxide is stored there, 1.2 miles (1.9 km) below land. Currently the site is being operated by BP, Statoil and Sonatrach. The operation made headlines during the December 2008 meeting of OPEC in Algiers.
- December 28: Algeria plans to invest $1.5 billion to modernize and expand its rail network. The project is part of an effort to expand railway connectivity to the high plateau region and refurbish railroads in the rest of the country.
- December 29: Omar Belhouchet, an Algerian editor of the French-language daily, El Watan, was jailed for three months along with one of his journalists, Salima Tlemcani. They were found guilty in a libel suit dating back to 2004. They wrote an article claiming that a faith healer was an imposter.
  In 2004 Tlemcani won a Courage in Journalism Award from the International Women's Media Foundation (IWMF).
