= 2009 in Algeria =

Events from the year 2009 in Algeria

== Incumbents ==
- President: Abdelaziz Bouteflika
- Prime Minister: Ahmed Ouyahia

== Events ==
=== January ===
- January 2: The death toll from political violence reached sixteen in the month of December 2008, double the number of the previous month. The total killed in 2008 dropped to 338 from 491 in 2007. Al-Qaeda in the Islamic Maghreb claimed to have murdered five members of government security forces in December 2008.
- January 3: Al-Qaeda's North African wing claimed to have killed at least 29 members of the Algerian security forces in the past three months. It conducted 21 attacks in northern Algeria, between September and December 2008. The incursions came in Béjaïa, Constantine, Algeria, and Biskra. The group was previously known as the Salafist Group for Preaching and Combat (GSPC).
- January 7: The Palestinian ambassador to Algeria, Ahmed Al-Hourani, emphasized the importance of regaining unity among all factions in Palestine. He told Fatour Essabah that Israel has set a new map of the region, separating the Gaza Strip from the West Bank, and joining them to Egypt and Jordan, respectively.
- January 7: In Dhebahia, western Bouïra Province, a 65-year-old woman sustained a leg injury while she was harvesting olives with another family member. She was treated in the emergency area of her town's hospital after she stepped on a bomb planted by terrorists.
- January 12: Protectors of the Salafiste Preaching Group, a rival terrorist organization to Al-Qaeda in the Islamic Maghreb, is led by Mohamed Ben Salem, a.k.a. Abu Djaafar Al-Afghani. The group has posted video recordings of attacks against Algerian army forces in Tipaza, Sidi Bel Abbès, Ain Deffla, Relizene, and Tissemsilt. These are regions in which Al-Qaeda has yet to establish known bases.
- January 12: Terrorist murdered a 40-year-old man and his 75-year-old mother during an ambush in Amelza in southern Sidi Bel Abbès. The attackers used a gun stolen from an 80-year-old man to kill the two people and injure another relative, who was hospitalized.
- January 13: Reporters Without Borders urged Algerian authorities to conduct a full investigation into the attempted murder of Hafnaoui Ghoul, a journalist for the daily al-Wassat. Ghoul, a human rights advocate, was approached by a group of hooded assailants who gagged him and tore his clothes on the night of January 6, 2009. The attempt came at Ghoul's home in Djelfa and the attackers fled without being identified.
- January 14: The criminal court in Algiers has sentenced to death a terrorist bearing the initials K.J., with the nickname Abou Khitama. He was charged with killing hundreds of civilians and security agents after joining terror organizations in Aïn Defla province in 1994. Khitama was arrested on June 13, 2005. His murders occurred over the years from 1996 to 2005.
- January 14: Algerian Labour Party PT Louisa Hanoune expressed opposition to a government proposal to install a national committee of elections supervising. She believes that such an organization has not been proved to be efficient.
- January 17: The GAC Group of Dubai has opened a ship agency in Algeria to exploit the booming gas and oil business there.
- January 18: Al-Qaeda militants in training have been reported to have succumbed to the Black Death, a plague which decimated Europe during the Middle Ages.
- January 21: Fifteen people have died during storms which occurred in Algeria over a 48-hour period. Most of the dead were the victims of traffic accidents. The storms struck both the northern and southern parts of the country. Hundreds of homes in Alouef, Ouargia, and Ghardaya have been damaged.
- January 21: Algeria Telecom has formed a partnership with Iristel under the Algeria Connect brand. With Algeria Connect phone calls can be made from Algerian phones to locations worldwide at the cost of a local call.
- January 21: Algerian judicial police reported a total of 34,000 crimes committed in the nation during 2008. 23,900 people were involved and 23,729 were taken into custody.
- January 28: Algeria's foreign ministry admonished the United States for warning of terrorist attacks in Algiers, during a meeting with a senior American diplomat.
- January 28: Bovine tuberculosis is prevalent in Algeria despite the efforts of government authorities to control the disease. The abattoirs of Algiers and Blida were studied between August and November 2007. A total of 7250 animals in all were screened. In 260 of these gross visible granulomatous lesions were found and put into culture. Bacterial isolates were afterward analyzed employing molecular methods.
- January 28: Andrew Warren, Algeria CIA station chief according to Propaganda Press, is alleged to have raped two Muslim women during his posting in the North African nation. He is supposed to have used a knockout drug to lace the women's drinks prior to the assault, ABC News reported.

=== February ===
- February 5: Abou Djerra Soltani, head of the Movement of Society for Peace, said that he has no regrets for having once been a candidate of the Islamic Salvation Front (FIS), during the legislative elections of 1991.
- February 10: Algerian President Abdelaziz Bouteflika designated April 9, 2009 as the date for the nation's presidential election. He invited a number of international groups to monitor the elections by sending observers.
- February 10: Growth in Algerian gas exports may disappoint European nations which hope to trim their reliance on imports from Russia. Algeria, the third biggest contributor of gas to the European Union is readying to step up its exports. It will add a pipeline to Spain and increase the capacity of its existing links to both Spain and Italy.
- February 14: The Algerian state news agency reported that two roadside bombs exploded in eastern Algeria, killing seven people. The first bomb detonated in Foum El-Metlag, close to the country's eastern border with Tunisia. Two police officers and a firefighter died when a second bomb exploded after rescue services arrived. The tragic events took place in the aftermath of President Bouteflika's announcement that he would seek a third term in office.
- February 18: Al-Jazeera aired a recording by members of Al-Qaeda in the Islamic Maghreb in which they claim to have kidnapped two Canadian diplomats, one of them a former advisor to Canadian prime minister Pierre Trudeau. The men were abducted in Niger in December 2008. Salah Abu Mohammed, spokesman for the Algerian/North African group, also claimed responsibility for the capture of four European tourists in January 2009. The four were kidnapped in Mali, and are a British citizen, two Swiss, and a German.
- February 18: The Algerian Office of Childhood Protection and Minors' Crimes revealed that up to 1414 children in the country suffered sexual abuse in 2008. This included 762 female children and 652 male children.
- February 25: Nigeria and Algeria began talks in Abuja about completing a Memorandum of Understanding (MOU). The agreement would implement the Trans Sahara Gas Pipeline, which will transport gas from Nigeria to be delivered to Mediterranean and European gas markets. The gas line will also pass through Niger and Algeria.
- February 25: A patrol associated with the Malian National Gendarmerie seized a sizable cache of arms and munitions intended to be delivered to Al-Qaeda in the Islamic Maghreb. The arms load included a large number of machine guns and ammunition, launchers, mortars, and anti-tank missiles. The weapons were in transit from Guinea and were taken by authorities in Bamako, Mali. It is assumed that the cache was financed by the kidnapping and ransom of two Austrian tourists, who were later freed in November 2008. The Austrian government denies having paid for their ransom.
- February 25: Morocco expresses a willingness to discuss reopening its border with Algeria, which has been closed for fifteen years. It will also entertain talks concerning fighting terrorism, drug smuggling, and illegal immigration.
- February 27: Members of Algeria's North African wing claim to have killed nine security guards near an Algerian power facility close to Jijel, approximately 215 miles east of Algiers. The attack was carried out using bombs and mortars. The guards were employed by Sonelgaz, and they were working on an electricity dam.

=== March ===
- March 3: Algerian state radio says that members of the Algerian military killed sixteen militants aligned to Al-Qaeda during the past weekend. The raid began on Friday near Blida, beginning with a tip from a terror support cell which was penetrated a week before. The government has killed one hundred and twenty members of Al-Qaeda in the Islamic Maghreb in the past six months.
- March 3: Candidates for the April 9 Algerian Presidential election number six, including incumbent President Bouteflika. The others are leftwinger Louisa Hanoune, the only woman candidate, nationalists Moussa Touati and Fawzi Rebaine, and Islamist politicians Mohammed Said (a moderate) and Djahid Younsie (a hardliner).
- March 9: At least two people died on March 7 during an attack on Algerian security forces in Tadmait, near Tizi Ouzou, about sixty miles east of Algiers.
- March 10: Nadjar Hadj Daoud was released from Chaabet Ennachine Prison in Ghardaïa on Monday, March 9. Daoud, the managing director of Al-Waha (The Oasis) is a frequent critic of the corruption in the administration of Algerian President Bouteflika. His six-month jail sentence for defamation was issued by a minor court in 2005 and upheld by Algeria's highest court in 2008. Daoud was imprisoned for his article in Al Waha which described multiple rapes by a local government official against his female coworkers. Daoud was provisionally released by a judge following an assassination attempt almost one month ago.
- March 14: Algerian border guards seized 3.5 tons of cannabis in a desert region close to the frontier with Morocco. The cannabis was confiscated near Erg Ferradj, approximately 100 kilometers from Béchar. More than 38 tons was seized in 2008 compared to only 4 tons in 2007.
- March 16: An Algerian sheep farmer had his throat slit and three of his children were killed in a bomb attack near the border with Tunisia. Militants killed three hundred sheep prior to killing their owner in this attack in Houidjbet. The motive for the attack was uncertain.
- March 19: Algerian chief investment officer of Spa Dahli, Abdelouahab Rahim, 57, has proposed an urban renewal project for Algiers. In February 2009 Rahim floated a 91.3 million pounds bond issue to fund a portion of the project. It is worth a total of 2.5 billion pounds in investment over a number of years. It is the first public bond offering made by a private Algerian company.
- March 22: A prosecutor of the criminal court of Oran ordered the detention of a forty-year-old woman for belonging to an international network of terror which targeted important personages in Algeria. She contends that the female terrorist network is headed by the Israeli Mossad. The center of the network is located in Egypt and some Persian Gulf nations.
- March 22: The five opponents of President Bouteflika trail the incumbent in terms of financing for the April 9 election. The state provides fifteen million dinars (€150,000) to each candidate for his campaign. However this sum is insufficient to cover the costs of public meetings, posters, and updating websites. In Algiers 5,000 associations and neighborhood committees have been entrusted with the task of convincing voters to go out and vote.
- March 24: Gas asphyxiation accounts for the death of one person per day in Algeria. As many as thirty persons per day die during the cold season and two hundred nineteen succumbed to gas asphyxia in 2008.
- March 25: 120 Algerian Harragas (illegal immigrants) are serving prison terms in Adana Province after being charged with illegal immigration and attempting to cross the border into Greece. The term of their detention in jail in northwest Turkey is five days.
- March 31: Burgan Bank has purchased a 60% stake in TMs Gulf Bank of Algeria it was announced on March 30.
- March 31: Gambia and host Algeria will meet in the final of the 8th CAF-17 soccer championship. The Baby Scorpions of Gambia shutout Malawi 4–0 in a semifinal played in Zéralda on March 29.

=== April ===
- April 5: A police officer who feared terrorists would kill him and his family committed suicide in Gouraya (Department of Tipaza). He ended his life with a service weapon after receiving death threats from a terrorist group.
- April 6: Al-Qaeda warned Algerian voters against reelecting President Bouteflika in the April 9 election. In a statement posted on jihadi forums, Al-Qaeda in the Islamic Maghreb called Bouteflika a "ferocious enemy" to Muslims. They asked for money and moral support for the mujahideen.
- April 6: Algerian authorities arrested thirty-five terrorists from various North African countries including Mauretania, Tunisia, Libya, Morocco, and a single one from Mali. Each is thought to have ties to Al-Qaeda in the Islamic Maghreb. The one Mali national is considered to be associated with the famous "ivory" case.
- April 6: Tunisian human rights activist, Sihem Bensidrene, was expelled on her arrival at Algiers' airport after arriving from Paris, France. She represented a working group monitoring Arab media. She was invited to Algeria by the LDDH. The group denounces the Bouteflika regime's opposition to the defenders of human rights in the Maghreb.
- April 9: President Bouteflika expressed "sadness and pain" upon hearing of the earthquake which struck L'Aquila, Italy on April 6. He transmitted a message of condolence to Italian President Giorgio Napolitano.
- April 10: Abdelaziz Bouteflika tallied 90.24% of the vote to earn a third mandate as Algerian president on April 9. Voting was carried out under tight security. Two incidents of violence occurred when a bomb exploded at a polling station in Imeghenine near Boumerdès, and a police officer died after a roadside bomb detonated in Tébessa.
- April 14: Mohammed Djahid Younsi, Ali Faouizi Rebaine, and Louisa Hanoune, challengers to Bouteflika in the April 9 presidential election, accused the administration of rigged elections throughout Algeria's forty-eight provinces. Hanoune plans to file a claim with the Constitutional Council with an appeal of the results.
- April 19: The upcoming Pan-African Festival will mark Africa's return to the international cultural stage. It will be held in Algiers forty years after the noted PanAf of 1969. Forty-four of the fifty-three member states of the African Union have confirmed that they will participate. Other nations which will attend include the United States, Cuba, Venezuela, and Brazil.
- April 23: Algeria Watch, a French and German human rights organization, estimates 10,000 people disappeared between 1992 and 1996 during the war between the Algerian government and Islamic rooted militants and guerrillas. President Bouteflika offered amnesty to rebels who gave up their insurgency in 2006. He has promised to expand his offer following his recent re-election.
- April 28: President Bouteflika reappointed Ahmed Ouyahia as Prime Minister after Ouyahia earlier submitted his resignation.
- April 28: The brother of a contractor in the town of Jijel was kidnapped by a terrorist group led by "Noureddine", alias "Djelbib".
- April 28: The father of Abou Daoud, 34, coordinator of Al-Qaeda in the Islamic Maghreb, has been arrested by Algerian security forces in the Department of Tlemcen. Daoud sustained a serious injury during a fight between Moroccan police and members of his terrorist group. Born in 1975, he was responsible for logistics operations in Al-Qaeda bases in Boumerdès and Tizi Ouzou.
- April 29: The Ministry of Health, Population, and Hospital Reform issued a communique which stated Algeria has the necessary means to combat swine flu.
- April 29: The strawberry fair is held every two years at the community arts centre in Jijel. The provincial agriculture department reports that the event is being attended by a number of producers and strawberry cultivators this year.

=== May ===
- May 4: The criminal court in the jurisdiction of Tizi Ouzou sentenced three people to life imprisonment on a charge of forgery. The same court sentenced three other individuals to twenty-year sentences without suspension. The case dates back to July 25, 2006, when the court of Azazga received a complaint from France.
- May 4: The Tunisian group Loukil, formed in 1998, is near opening an industrial unit in Algeria. The company is expected to invest eight million pounds after acquiring a plant in the Azaba region in Annaba. The firm makes steel structures used in construction workshops and infrastructures.
- May 6: The Bank of Algeria is initiating a new system for opening and managing bank accounts in foreign currency. Specifically, new regulations focus on curbing "concealed embezzlements" by foreign companies, their owners and managers.
- May 6: There are a growing number of medical mistakes in hospitals and medical centers throughout Algeria. 200 medical errors remain pending from 2006. The Chairman of the Council of Medical Deontology is requesting that a law be enacted requiring private clinics to be insured.
- May 11: Mohand Issaad, head of a fact-finding panel regarding events in the Kabylie region in 2001, describes Algerian justice as a "caricature-like situation". He attributes the causes to congestion of people, as well as economic, social, and cultural factors.
- May 11: The Office of National Exams and Contests (ONEC) stated that up to forty centers of exam correction have been opened in Algeria. From twenty to fifty teachers in each province will be assigned the task of correcting exams. Technical reasons have prevented the opening of such centers in some southern areas like Tindouf, Illizi, Adrar, and Tamanrasset.
- May 11: Amari Saifi, a former Algerian Islamist leader, is urging leaders of al-Qaeda's North African wing to lay down their arms. A security crackdown has resulted in a sharp decrease in attacks. Saifi planned the 2003 kidnapping of thirty-two tourists. He wants remaining insurgents to accept a longstanding amnesty offer.
- May 13: Kim Jong Il sent a telegram congratulating Algerian Prime Minister Ahmed Ouyahia on being reappointed prime minister.
- May 20: Spanish police arrested thirteen people in Bilbao who are suspected of financing Islamic militants in Algeria. Authorities broke up a gang of twelve Algerians and one Iraqi who are thought to be involved in drug trafficking, and robbery.
- May 22: The Algerian coast guard has arrested twenty-two illegal migrants whose ages range from 17 to 31 in Annaba province. Traveling in a handmade boat four miles north of Cape Ras El Hamra, their destination was the Italian coast.
- May 22: Al-Qaeda in the Islamic Maghreb has announced a fifteen-day deadline for the English negotiator prior to executing an English tourist held by the organization since the beginning of 2009. Al-Qaeda is using the English tourist as a bargaining chip to obtain the release of Abu Qatada El Filastini, alias Mohamad Abou Omar, age 48.
- May 22: A French court has rejected demands from military veterans for millions of dollars in compensation for thirty years of nuclear testing in Algeria and French Polynesia. However the French government is planning to draft legislation to compensate some victims of nuclear testing.

=== June ===
- June 1: Algerian Minister of Energy and Mines, Chakib Kelil, says that hydrocarbons revenues in 2009 will likely vary between $40 and $45 billion. He estimates that oil prices may reach $70 to $75 per barrel in 2010 if the United States and European economies recover. Until the conclusion of this year Kelil surmises oil prices will stabilize between $60 and $65 per barrel.
- June 2: Algerian security forces have arrested four men accused of plotting to abduct foreigners. One of these men, Abu Djendel, once worked as a keeper of a garden adjacent to the Homeland Security Directorate (DGSN), and Bastion 23 Castle. One group of persons watched foreigners to see which places they frequented, while another planned their abductions or targeted them for terrorist attacks.
- June 3: The North African wing of Al-Qaeda put to death English hostage Edwin Dyer in Mali. The group had been threatening to kill Dwyer unless Abu Qatada, a Jordanian Islamist, was released from an English prison. Dwyer was assassinated on May 31 following the expiration of a second deadline imposed by Al-Qaeda.
- June 8: A municipal guard was killed and two others injured by a roadside bomb near Tizi Ouzou on June 7. The bomb exploded in Mizrana as the vehicle arrived carrying the guards. The communal guard was created in 1996 to support security forces in municipalities.
- June 8: Algeria hopes to raise its natural gas exports to thirty billion cubic meters over the next five years according to Chakib Khelil, Minister of Energy and Mines. The volume exported via the Trans-Med gas pipeline linking Algeria to Italy will be increased by up to seven billion cubic meters.
- June 16: A group of Palestinian children arrived in Rafah on their way to Algeria. They will spend holidays there following psychotherapy following an attack by Israeli forces. The group is made of sixteen people, including nine children and seven guides
- June 16: An Algerian citizen residing in Lehdada in the Department of Tlemcen took hostages in the visa office of the Moroccan embassy, while carrying a large dagger in his hand. Security services managed to subdue the man after surrounding the premises around midday on Monday. The man resided near the border of Morocco and Algeria. The former captives are Moroccan except for one, who is of German nationality.
- June 20: Algeria's initial case of swine flu has been detected at Houari Boumediene Airport. The sick woman is an Algerian national who resides in Frankfurt, Germany and came to Algiers from Miami, Florida. She was conveyed to El Kettar Hospital for treatment.
- June 22: Al-Qaeda in the Islamic Maghreb is claiming responsibility for murdering 18 paramilitary policemen and 1 civilian. An attack on a security convoy for Chinese construction workers in Mansoura, Bordj Bou Arréridj Province, on June 17, is one of 10 carried out by AQIM between May 22 and June 18.
- June 25: Al-Qaeda in the Islamic Maghreb claims to have killed American aid worker, Chris Leggett, in Mauritania, on June 23. al Jazeera TV reports that Leggett was murdered for spreading Christianity. A native of Cleveland, Tennessee, Leggett taught at a centre specializing in computer sciences and languages in a working class section of Nouakchott. He was shot several times by unidentified gunmen.

=== July ===
- July 2: Russian industry sources report that Iran and Algeria are considering acquiring Russian-origin submarines in 2010. The particular submarines the countries desire are of the Project-636 and Amur-1650 classes.
- July 7: Karim Ziani, a midfielder from Algeria, signed a four-year contract with VfL Wolfsburg. Formerly with Olympique Marseille, the 26-year-old is the second signing by the German club since winning the championship of the Bundesliga in May.
- July 9: SNC-Lavalin Inc., announced that it will design a new city in Algeria, to be built over an eight-year period, which will be large enough for 80,000 inhabitants.
- July 13: Cuban President Raúl Castro is in Algeria. He was greeted by Algerian President Bouteflika.
- July 13: The North African wing of Al-Qaeda received $4.17 million for the release of Swiss hostage Werner Greiner. Greiner was handed over to authorities in the remote northern region of Mali on July 12. Greiner was kidnapped along with Edwin Dyer near the border of Mali and Niger on January 22. The source declined to say who paid the ransom.
- July 16: Support is building among the Algerian establishment for a new amnesty for al-Qaeda members, even the most militant. However some, who formerly surrendered under previous amnesty offers, are taking up arms again, due to depressed living conditions.
- July 21: In the town of Dellys, Algerian security forces shot and killed a 25-year-old man who was wearing a belt which contained explosives. He planned to use a bomb against the coast guard in the town. The man, Omar Toudji, was a member of the Al Ansar cell of al-Qaeda in the Islamic Maghreb. He joined the fundamentalist guerrillas in 2004. Dellys is 100 kilometers east of Algiers.
- July 28: Six people died and twenty-five more were injured when a lorry, coach, and cross-country vehicle crashed. The lorry overtook another vehicle about thirty kilometers from the town of Chlef, west of Algiers. It collided with the coach and the car.
- July 30: Bouteflika has established two companies which will manufacture weapons for the Algerian defense industry. One company, EDIV, will be known by its French acronym. It will produce commercial vehicles for a factory in Tiaret, northwest Algeria.
- July 31: Algeria has joined Mali and Libya in planning an offensive against the Al-Qaeda network. The countries have agreed to share intelligence and to plan military operations against the terrorist organization.

=== August ===
- August 5: More than ten Chinese were injured in a confrontation between Chinese businessmen and Algerians in Algiers. It was not reported the extent of the injuries but it was mentioned that some Chinese citizens might leave Algeria.
- August 5: France denied that its consulate in Algeria was involved in spying activities in the North African nation.
- August 13: Three suspected militants have been killed by the Algerian army in the Bordj Bou Arréridj region, approximately 200 kilometers southeast of Algiers. The men traveled in three cars and were surprised by troops who were acting on a tip-off. Army members recovered homemade bombs and weapons. The area is a transit passage for terrorists associated with al-Qaeda in the Islamic Maghreb.
- August 14: The Algerian football team defeated Uruguay 2–1 in a friendly match at the 5 July Stadium in Algiers. The team is preparing for a 2010 World Cup qualification game versus Zambia in September.
- August 15: 17 people were killed in a head-on collision near Ghazaouet, when a lorry and a minibus collided. More than a dozen members of the same family were traveling together and died.
- August 16: A survey revealed that there are 1,169,000 unemployed persons in Algeria. The study by the Office of National Statistics discloses that 87% of unemployed Algerians are willing to accept work positions below their levels of education.
- August 20: The potential for terrorist attacks threatens the construction of a 2,500 mile Trans-Sahara gas pipeline projected to run from Nigeria through Niger, to Algeria. The region is perilous because of the prospect of attacks by al-Qaeda forces. The pipeline will cost in the neighborhood of $13 billion and feed natural gas to Europe.
- August 28: President Bouteflika has called for Algeria to expand its defense industry. His mandate will, if successful, enable the country to become self-sufficient in a number of areas of military production.
- August 29: Five people were killed in two separate attacks in eastern and western Algeria. Two members of the Algerian military died in a car bomb attack while two more armed soldiers were murdered in Jijel Province. Three soldiers were wounded in this ambush by Islamic radicals against the Algerian army. Bouteflika continued to pledge amnesty to repentant terrorists.

=== September ===
- September 3: Three officials who are employees of the Houari Boumediene Airport, were arrested after an investigation guided security officials to an attempted heist of €595,000. The three are suspected in an embezzlement plot involving other airlines which operate in Algeria.
- September 7: Algeria defeated Zambia 1–0 in a World Cup qualifying match. Afterward fireworks erupted in the town of Sidi Amar and thousands of people flooded the streets. Twelve fans were injured during fighting in the streets of Constantine. Two who were hurt seriously were evacuated to a hospital.
- September 11: Eight people were taken away by flash floods and a ninth was killed during thunderstorms which occurred in southwestern Algeria. 700 km southwest of Algiers, 4 people drowned in El Bayadh. In the Naama district, 600 km from Algiers, 4 died when their auto was caught in a flash flood in a river bed.
- September 17: Servge Gurvil, director general of the Algerian subsidiary Diamal, was dismissed from his position after making comments regarding the political situation in Algeria. Gurvil had received a warning on April 15, 2009, after he wrote an earlier document. A new CEO will be appointed, probably in the next week.
- September 22: El Mouhtarem, the author of Algérie-politique, writes for a pro-government newspaper during the day. Following work he becomes the author of one of Algeria's most popular political blogs. A law which is likely to be approved in October calls for Internet police to crack down on online criminal and terrorist activities. If free speech is restricted by the law, El Mouhtarem's blog could become endangered.
- September 23: A soldier in Idjalouahen, near Timizert, was killed when a roadside bomb exploded on September 17. The bomb is believed to have been planted by terrorists who are active in the region between Boumerdès and Tizi Ouzou.
- September 26: A terrorist group and the Algerian armed forces confronted each other in Boumerdès on September 25, in the Ghazeroual region. The altercation came after a two-day operation by the armed forces. The army acted upon information about presumed terrorist movements between Baghila and Naciria, in Boumerdès. Two terrorists, likely members of Saryate Ghazaroual, are thought to have been injured in the combat.
- September 28: 930 fully inhabited bee hives will soon be distributed to beekeepers in Tébessa Province, 634 kilometers east of Algiers. This is a portion of a program of integrated rural development (PPDRI). It will provide hives to 83 beekeepers, covering 28 communes in Tébessa.
- September 29: President Bouteflika is in Havana, Cuba, where he arrived on the evening of September 28 for three days of work and friendship. Bouteflika and President Raúl Castro will look at ways to enhance bilateral cooperation. They will also consult on regional and international issues they have in common.

=== October ===
- October 7: An English medical delegation has agreed to visit Algeria once a month to provide medical care for infants suffering from congenital cardiopathy. The English doctors will expedite disease diagnosing techniques and distance training through video conference systems.
- October 7: Most of the attacks conducted by the Salafist Group For Preaching and Combat (GSPC) employs the use of homemade bombs and explosives. These devices are used because the terrorists lack military means and manpower. The explosives have rendered immense casualties to members of the Algerian security services.
- October 9: Journalist and rights activist Hafnaoui Ghoul is on trial for criticizing local authorities in Djelfa province. The committee to Protect Journalists has asked Algerian authorities to drop charges against Ghoul.
- October 12: Ten Islamic militants and three soldiers were killed in an intense gun battle in the Sahara Desert. This occurred when a convoy of well armed militants was attacked by members of the Algerian army. The gunmen, traversing the desert in 4X4 vehicles, looked for refuge near the Great Erg, the world's largest sand dune. They repelled security forces, killing three and wounding two more. A security chief in Béchar said that Algerian troops, supported by army helicopters, killed ten militants, including three who were not Algerian nationals.
- October 17: Algeria's Ministry of Public Works is studying the feasibility of a road link between Tindouf and Choum in northern Mauretania.
- October 19: President Bouteflika is closely following the progress of the Algerian national soccer team which will play Egypt in a qualifying match for the 2010 World Cup, to be held in South Africa.
- October 19: L. Mourad, nicknamed Nouh Abu Qatada Es-Salafi, a terrorist, was ambushed and killed in El Khither, in the province of El Bayedh. Known as "the Salafi" in English, L. Mourad was one of the oldest and most ominous of the amirs of the GSPC, Groupe Salafiste pour la Predication et le Combat.
- October 22: Sonatrach has joined France's Total and Spain's Cepsa in the Timimoun natural gas project. Located in southwestern Algeria, Timimoun expects to produce 1.6 billion cubic meters of natural gas annually.
- October 23: Hundreds of youths from the Algiers' slum district, Diar Echems, threw stones at police from the roads which lead to their decrepit homes. The youths, with their parents' assistance, were protesting the need for them to sleep in rooms which are occupied by ten or more people. Another reason for the violence is that Algerian authorities threatened to prohibit the construction of shanties on a soccer ground in the area.
- October 27: The Algerian-American Sonatrach-Anadarko announced the signing of a $149.7 million contract with the Italian firm Bonatti. The agreement is for conducting gas facilities near Hassi Messaoud, Algeria's largest oil field.
- October 29: Two hundred Tunisian families crossed the border between Algeria and Tunisia in late October. They occupied tents in the El Mezara region, in the town of Bir El Ater, Tébessa Province. They have requested political asylum from Algerian authorities after fleeing Hogra injustice.

=== November ===
- November 4: Six new cases of A/H1N1 have been confirmed by the Algerian Health Ministry. This brings the total number of Swine Flu cases up to 98. A 24-year-old foreign national in Algiers and a 5-year-old residing in Tizi Ouzou have recently been diagnosed with the virus.
- November 5: National army forces killed a terrorist in the village of Ouzellaguen, and seized his Kalashnikov rifle. Several terrorists, including one wounded, escaped. The terrorist's body was taken to Khelil Amrane in Béjaïa for identification.
- November 7: A meeting in Algiers was held between Dr. Sheikh Abderrahmane al-Nuaimi Ben Amir, an activist for human rights and Qatari preacher noted for his strong positions, and former leaders of the Salafist Group For Preaching and Combat (GSPC). Hassan Hattab (Abu Hamza), founder of GSPC, outlined an initiative which seeks to stop the bloodshed in Algeria.
- November 12: Algeria ranked 1st in Group C, 3 points ahead of Egypt, prior to a meeting of the two countries' soccer teams on November 14 in Cairo, Egypt.
- November 12: The total number of persons infected by H1N1 influenza in Algeria has risen to 133, with 11 new cases confirmed by the Ministry of Health, Population, and Hospital Reform.
- November 14: On November 13 Abdelmalek Droukdal and 48 of his associates were sentenced to death in absentia. This judgment was rendered for their participation in an April 2007 attack in Algiers, which caused the deaths of 11 people and injured more than 100.
- November 15: The Spanish Civil Guard announced the arrest of an Algerian suspected of being a part of a terrorist organization. He was providing terrorist cells in Algeria with information and assistance with logistics and finances.
- November 23: Six people were arrested and taken before a judge at El Harrach by the anti-terrorist unit of judiciary police. They are from Berraki and Errais in Sidi Moussa. Each has been detained following accusations that they belong to a terrorist group and support terrorism. The network is considered responsible for reigniting terrorism in Algiers by recruiting youths into their organization. The arrested persons are between 21 and 35.
- November 23: 18 new cases of H1N1 have been confirmed in Algeria on November 22, bringing the total number of cases in the nation to 186. 5 cases were reported in Constantine, Algeria, including two young women ages 27 and 22, a 15-year-old girl, an 8-year-old girl, and a boy, age 9.
- November 29 A French citizen has been kidnapped by Al-Qaeda in the Islamic Maghreb in the northern Mali town of Ménaka. Located 1,500 northeast of Bamako, the man was seized in a hotel on the night of November 26, November 27.
- November 30: 25 new cases of A/H1N1 swine flu were confirmed by the health ministry on November 29. 11 people in Algiers have been diagnosed with the virus. 299 cases have been reported altogether in Algeria. 3 people have died.

=== December ===
- December 6: Oil ministers of the Organization of Arab Petroleum Exporting Countries (OAPEC) reported that international investment in petroleum has decreased by 20% due to the 2008 financial crisis.
- December 8: Egypt will return its ambassador to Algeria provided that Algeria compensates Egypt for vandalized property, resulting in the aftermath of a soccer game and row which followed it. The Egyptian ambassador was recalled from Algeria in November 2009.
- December 9: A 32-year-old pregnant woman in Oran died of A/H1N1 on December 1, 2009. Including the death of a 26-year-old Sétif man, the number of deaths attributable to the virus in Algeria is 10.
- December 9: The Algerian army destroyed 5,700 mines from the pre-Algerian independence era, in November 2009. The mines, most of them raised by the French arm], were part of a demining program, which continues 47 years after Algerian independence. As of November 30, 2009, 426,599 mines, 358,515 antipersonnel mines, 65,873 anti-group mines, and 2,211 illuminating mines had been eliminated in the operation.
- December 9: Three Spanish humanitarians have been detained by members of Al-Qaeda in the Islamic Maghreb. The kidnapping occurred on November 29 while they were in Mauritania. In a separate excursion the forces of AQIM took prisoner a Frenchman, Pierre Camatte, in Mali on November 25.
- December 10: High-ranking officials, acting on the advice of intelligence services, are encouraging the United Nations Security Council to adopt an Algerian proposal to limit the payment of ransom to terrorist groups.
- December 22: Despite having a large group of women participating in the health-care, justice, and educational fields, the number of females holding parliamentary seats has declined from 35 in 1962 to 30 in 2007. Political and legal experts convened in Algiers on December 20 to increase awareness among Algerians about women's role in politics and their relationship to the media.
- December 28: Algerian border guards seized in excess of three tons of hashish and two Toyota all terrain vehicles in the vicinity of Akla El Bereaber. Traffickers abandoned the drugs and vehicles prior to escaping across the Moroccan border. A Kalashnikov rifle was also recovered during this military operation.
- December 29: Mali is facing a difficult dilemma in determining a response to Al-Qaeda in the Islamic Maghreb. It is particularly problematic to resolve on a course of action in response to hostages taken by the group. Currently six European kidnap victims are thought to be prisoners of Al-Qaeda in Mali.
- December 30: Chakib Khelil, Energy and Mining Minister, raised Algeria's estimated hydrocarbon export revenues from $40 billion to $43 billion. The higher estimate is the result of an increase in world oil prices. Sonatrach chief, Mohamed Meziane, stated that hydrocarbon revenues were valued at $34.5 billion in late October 2009.
- December 31: Al-Qaeda in the Islamic Maghreb have demanded $7 million and the release of a number of its members being detained in Mauretania in return for permitting the release of three Spanish aid workers it is holding in Mali. The three Spanish workers were kidnapped on November 29, 2009.
