= List of ministers of foreign affairs of Algeria =

The minister of foreign affairs of the People's Democratic Republic of Algeria is a cabinet minister in charge of the Ministry of Foreign Affairs of Algeria, responsible for conducting foreign relations of the country.

The following is a list of foreign ministers of Algeria since the establishment of the GPRA in 1958:

No.	Name (Birth–Death)	Portrait	Tenure
1	Mohamed Lamine Debaghine (1917–2003) In exile		1958–1960
2	Krim Belkacem (1922–1970) In exile		1960–1961
3	Saad Dahlab (1918–2000) In exile		1961–1962
4	Mohamed Khemisti (1930–1963)		1962–1963
5	Abdelaziz Bouteflika (1937–2021)		1963–1979
6	Mohammed Seddik Benyahia (1932–1982)		1979–1982
7	Ahmed Taleb Ibrahimi (1932–2025)		1982–1988
8	Boualem Bessaïh (1930–2016)		1988–1989
9	Sid Ahmed Ghozali (1937–2025)		1989–1991
10	Lakhdar Brahimi (b. 1934)		1991–1993
11	Redha Malek (1931–2017)		1993
12	Mohamed Salah Dembri (1938–2020)		1993–1996
13	Ahmed Attaf (b. 1953)		1996–1999
14	Youcef Yousfi (b. 1941)		1999–2000
15	Abdelaziz Belkhadem (b. 1945)		2000–2005
16	Mohammed Bedjaoui (b. 1929)		2005–2007
17	Mourad Medelci (1943–2019)		2007–2013
18	Ramtane Lamamra (b. 1952)		2013–2017
19	Abdelkader Messahel (b. 1949)		2017–2019
(18)	Ramtane Lamamra (b. 1952)		2019
20	Sabri Boukadoum (b. 1958)		2019–2021
(18)	Ramtane Lamamra (b. 1952)		2021–2023
(13)	Ahmed Attaf (b. 1953)		2023–present
