= Amar Bendjama =

Algerian diplomat

- عمار بن جامع
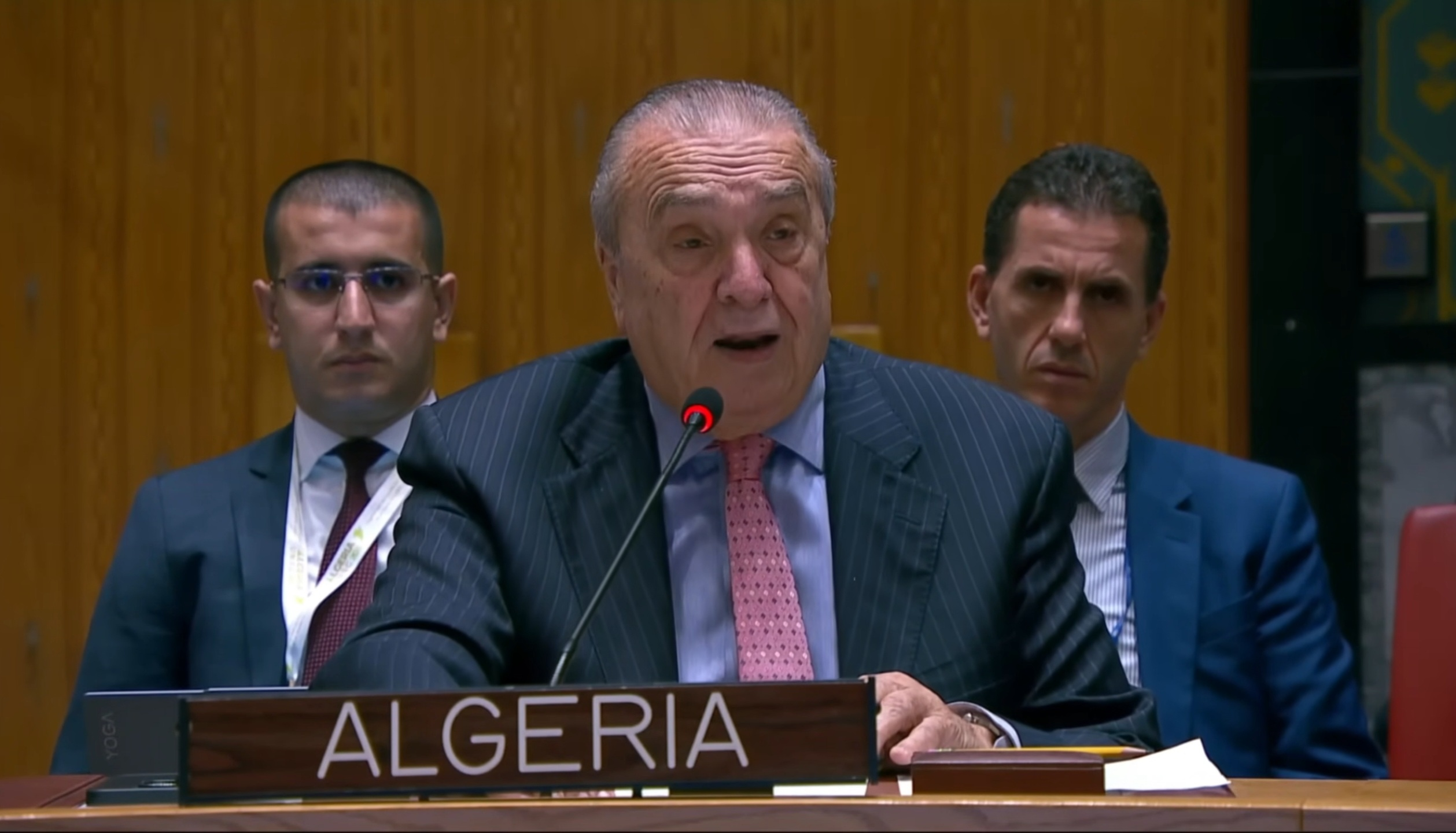
- Bendjama in 2025

Permanent Representative of Algeria to the United Nations
- Incumbent
- Assumed office 11 April 2023
- President: Abdelmadjid Tebboune
- Preceded by: Nadir Larbaoui

President of the United Nations Economic and Social Council
- Incumbent
- Assumed office 31 July 2026
- Preceded by: Lok Bahadur Thapa

Personal details
- Born: 1951 (age 74–75) Skikda, French Algeria
- Education: National School of Administration
- Profession: Politician; diplomat

Amar Bendjama (Arabic: عمار بن جامع; born 1951) is an Algerian diplomat. He currently holds the position of the president of United Nations Economic and Social Council (ECOSOC) and the Ambassador of Algeria and Permanent Representative to the United Nations in New York since April 11, 2023.

== Personal life ==
Bendjama is from the Skikda region in eastern Algeria. He studied and graduated from the National School of Administration, specializing in diplomacy, in the Frantz Fanon class of 1975. He then immediately joined the Ministry of Foreign Affairs, serving as Algeria's ambassador in several capitals around the world.

== Career ==
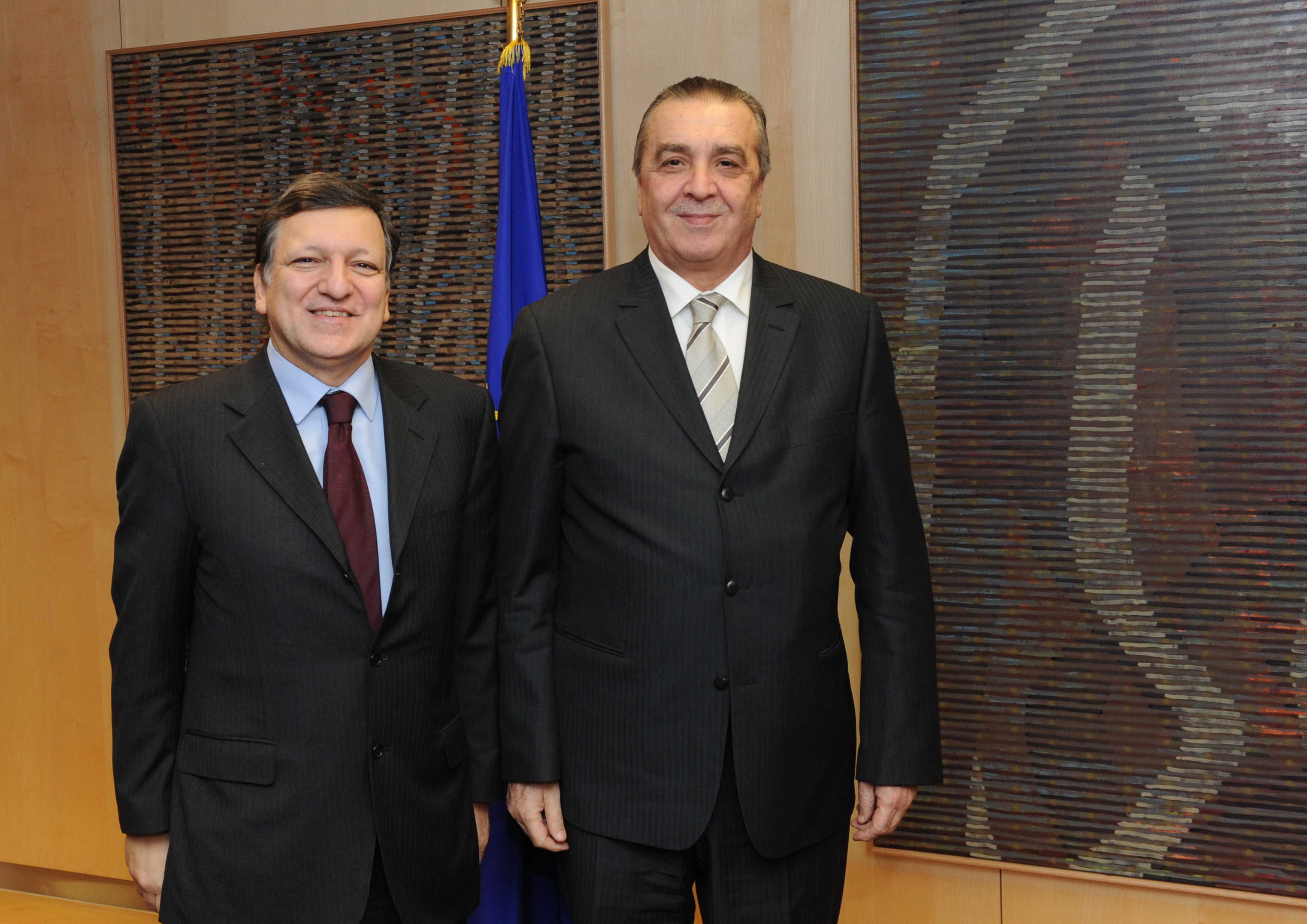
Amar Bendjama with José Manuel Barroso

Throughout his career, Amar Bendjama held several positions in the Ministry of Foreign Affairs. He began as the Head of the Official Visits Office in the ministry for two years (1977–1979). His first assignment outside Algeria came after Chadli Bendjedid assumed the presidency, as he served as First Secretary at the Algerian Embassy in the Soviet Union from 1980 to 1984. This position prepared him to become Director of the Eastern European Countries Division in the Ministry of Foreign Affairs for five years. He was then appointed as Deputy Permanent Representative of Algeria to the United Nations from 1989 to 1991, followed by a role as Ambassador to Ethiopia (1991–1994), where the African Union is headquartered. He was later transferred to London as Ambassador until 1996.

Bendjama was appointed Secretary General of the Ministry of Foreign Affairs after Ahmed Attaf became Minister of Foreign Affairs for the first time in 1996, during the presidency of Liamine Zéroual, and he held this position until 2000. He then served as Algeria's Ambassador to Japan for four years (2001–2005) and as an advisor to the Minister of Foreign Affairs on Euro-Mediterranean relations until 2009. Following this, he became Ambassador to Belgium and Luxembourg, as well as Algeria's Representative to the European Union and NATO from 2010 to 2013. Bendjama's final posting was as Ambassador in Paris for three years (2013–2016). He then remained as an advisor in the Ministry of Foreign Affairs until he was appointed as Algeria's Permanent Representative to the United Nations on April 11, 2023.

By presidential decree issued on April 11, 2023, Bendjama was appointed as Algeria's ambassador and permanent representative to the United Nations in New York, succeeding Nadir Larbaoui. This appointment coincided with Algeria's election as a non-permanent member of the Security Council for the 2024–2025 term. Bendjama became well known for his support of the Palestinian cause within the Security Council during the Gaza war. One of his memorable stances was when Palestine's permanent representative to the UN, Riyad Mansour, called on him to stand by his side for an official statement and the final group photo. Bendjama responded, "No, I am always behind you," as a sign of his unwavering and unconditional support for the Palestinian cause.

Bendjama was elected as the president of United Nations Economic and Social Council (ECOSOC) on 23 July 2026, replacing Lok Bahadur Thapa whose term ended on 31 July 2026.

== Honours ==
- 27 September 2025: Order of National Merit medal at the rank of "Achir", awarded by the President of the Republic Abdelmadjid Tebboune.
