= Mohamed Salah Dembri =

Algerian politician (1938–2020)

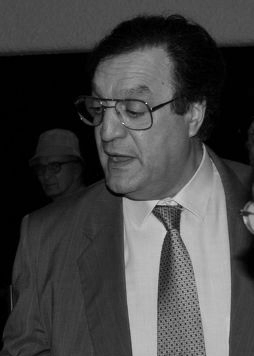

Minister of Foreign Affairs
- In office 1993–1996
- President: Ali Kafi; Liamine Zéroual
- Prime Minister: Mokdad Sifi
- Preceded by: Redha Malek
- Succeeded by: Ahmed Attaf

Personal details
- Born: 30 January 1938 El Harrouch, Algeria
- Died: 2 January 2020 (aged 81) Narbonne, France
- Party: National Liberation Front

Mohamed Salah Dembri (Arabic: محمد صالح دمبري; 30 January 1938 – 2 January 2020) was an Algerian politician. He was Minister of Foreign Affairs of Algeria from 1993 to 1996.

== Career ==
After his studies, Dembri studied at the Faculty of Social Sciences at the University of Paris. Subsequently, he was, among other things, secretary general of the ministry of higher education and scientific research and secretary general of the ministry of labour and social affairs. After being secretary general of the State Department between 1979 and 1982, he was ambassador to Canada from 1982 to 1984. He then worked as a government adviser on political and diplomatic affairs. In 1992, he became Ambassador to Greece and remained in this post until 1993.

Upon his return, Dembri took over the post of Minister of Foreign Affairs from Redha Malek in 1993, who in turn took up the post of Prime Minister on 23 August 1993 and formed a new government. Until 1996, Dembri also held the post of Minister of Foreign Affairs in the following governments of Prime Ministers Mokdad Sifi and Ahmed Ouyahia.

He then became Permanent Representative to the United Nations Office at Geneva in 1996 and remained in this post until 2005. At the same time, Dembri was accredited to the Holy See between 1997 and 2004. He was in 1999 President of the Conference on Disarmament UNCD (United Nations Conference on Disarmament) and between 2000 and 2001 president of the local working group for development rights, then from 2001 to 2003 President of a group of work of the Commission on Human Rights, before 2004 President of the Executive Committee of the 101st session of the International Organization for Migration (IOM).

Dembri was accredited as Ambassador Extraordinary and Plenipotentiary to the United Kingdom from September 2005 to 2010. He was also the founder of the National Institute for Global Strategic Studies and the author of numerous articles in professional journals. He was married and the father of two children.

Political offices
Preceded by Redha Malek	Minister of Foreign Affairs; 1993–1996	Succeeded by Ahmed Attaf
