= Mohammed Bedjaoui =

Algerian judge

His Excellency Mohammed Bedjaoui
- محمد بجاوي
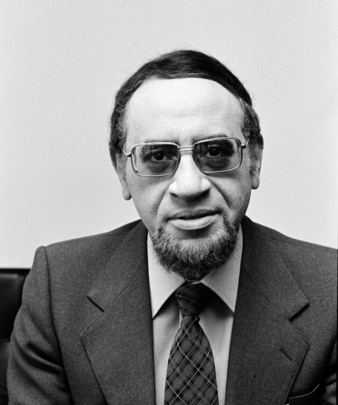

President of the International Court of Justice
- In office 1994–1997
- Vice President: Stephen M. Schwebel
- Preceded by: Robert Yewdall Jennings
- Succeeded by: Stephen M. Schwebel

President of the Constitutional Council of Algeria
- In office 2002–2005
- Preceded by: Saïd Boulchair
- Succeeded by: Boualem Bessaïh

Minister of Foreign Affairs of Algeria
- In office 2005–2007
- Preceded by: Abdelaziz Belkhadem
- Succeeded by: Mourad Medelci

Minister of Justice, Keeper of the Seals
- In office 1964–1970
- Preceded by: Mohamed El Hadi Hadj Smain
- Succeeded by: Boualem Benhamouda

Personal details
- Born: 21 September 1929 (age 97) Sidi Bel Abbès, French Algeria
- Education: University of Grenoble (PhD)
- Occupation: Judge

Mohammed Bedjaoui (Arabic: محمد بجاوي) (born September 21, 1929 in Sidi Bel Abbès) is an Algerian diplomat and jurist. He served as Algeria's ambassador to France and the United Nations among other places. He also served as a judge on the International Court of Justice and as President of the Constitutional Council, Algeria's highest judicial authority of constitutionality review.

== Early life and education ==
He was born in Sidi Bel Abbès, Algeria during French Colonization.

He earned a Diploma of the Grenoble Institute of Political Studies in 1952 and a PhD degree from University of Grenoble in 1956.

== Career ==
He was legal adviser of National Liberation Front (FLN) from 1956 to 1962.

At the beginning of the independence of Algeria, Mohammed Bedjaoui was appointed first as Secretary General of the Government in 1962, and then Minister of Justice, Keeper of the Seals from 1964 to 1970.

He was appointed Ambassador of Algeria to France from 1970 to 1979.

Mohammed Bedjaoui was appointed Ambassador at Permanent Representative of Algeria to the United Nations in New York from 1979 to 1982.

Mr. Bedjaoui was Judge at the International Court of Justice of the Hague for almost twenty years from 19 March 1982 to 20 September 2001.

His international law career has been summarised as "always committed to reforming international law from within the discipline’s centres of intellectual and professional power, but ... demonstrating an expansion and augmentation of his existing beliefs into a broader account of the historical and conceptual relations between colonialism and international law".

He was appointed Minister of Foreign Affairs on May 1, 2005 during a cabinet reshuffle, and remained in that position until the appointment of a new government on June 4, 2007, in which he was not included. He was replaced as foreign minister by Mourad Medelci.

== Major works ==
=== Selected books ===
- Bedjaoui, Mohammed. Fonction publique internationale et influences nationales. s.l.: Stevens, 1958. (in French)
- Bedjaoui, Mohammed. Law and the Algerian Revolution. Brussels: International Association of Democratic Lawyers, 1961.
- Bedjaoui, Mohammed. Terra nullius, "droits" historiques et autodétermination. s.l.: Autonomy, 1975. (in French)
- Bedjaoui, Mohammed. Towards a New International Economic Order. s.l.: Holmes and Meier, 1979.
- Bedjaoui, Mohammed. International law: achievements and prospects. Paris, Unesco, 1991.
- Bedjaoui, Mohammed. The New World Order and the Security Council: Testing the Legality of its Acts. Translated by Bernard Noble. s.l.: Nijhoff Publishers, 1995.

=== Selected academic articles and chapters ===
- Bedjaoui, Mohammed (1956). ‘Jurisprudence comparée des tribunaux administratifs internationaux en matière d'excès de pouvoir, 2 Annuaire français de droit international 482. (in French)
- Bedjaoui, Mohammed (1969). La nouvelle organisation judiciaire en Algérie, 23 Revue Juridique et Politique 521. (in French)
- Bedjaoui, Mohammed (1970). Problèmes récents de succession d'états dans les états nouveaux, 130 Recueil des cours (Lecture in the Collected Courses of the Hague Academy of International Law). (in French)
- Bedjaoui, Mohammed (1974). L' Algérie dans la lutte pour le développement du Tiers Monde, 1 Annuaire du tiers monde 17. (in French)
- Bedjaoui, Mohammed (1977). Aspects internationaux de la Constitution algérienne, 23 Annuaire francaise de droit international 75. (in French)
- Bedjaoui, Mohammed (1991). The “manufacture” of judgments at the International Court of Justice, 3 Pace International Law Review 29.
- Bedjaoui, Mohammed (1995). The Vision of Non-Occidental Cultures on the Legitimacy of Contemporary International Law, 11 Anuario de Derecho Internacional 23.
- Bedjaoui, Mohammed (1995). The Reception by National Courts of Decisions of International Tribunals, 28 New York University Journal of International Law and Politics 45.
- Bedjaoui, Mohammed (2004). The Convention for the Safeguarding of the Intangible Cultural Heritage: the Legal Framework and Universally Recognized Principles, 56 Museum International 150.
