= Mohamed Khemisti =

Algerian politician (1930–1963)

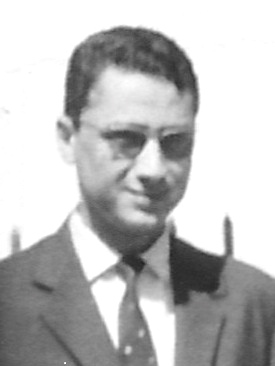

Minister of Foreign Affairs
- In office 28 September 1962 – 11 April 1963
- Prime Minister: Ahmed Ben Bella
- Preceded by: Saad Dahlab
- Succeeded by: Abdelaziz Bouteflika

Personal details
- Born: 11 August 1930 Maghnia, French Algeria
- Died: 5 May 1963 (aged 32) Algiers, Algeria
- Party: National Liberation Front

Mohamed Khemisti (Arabic: محمد خميستي; 11 August 1930 – 5 May 1963) was an Algerian politician. He was Minister of Foreign Affairs of Algeria for nine months, from 1962 prior to his assassination in 1963. He was married to Fatima Khemisti—instrumental in the enactment of the Khemisti Law, which raised the minimum age of marriage in Algeria to 16 for women and 18 for men.

He also had been the general secretary of UGEMA (the General Union of Muslim Algerian Students, in French Union Générale des Etudiants Musulmans Algériens) and was imprisoned by the French on 12 November 1957.

Political offices
Preceded by Saad Dahlab	Minister of Foreign Affairs; 1962–1963	Succeeded by Abdelaziz Bouteflika
