= Adda Chentouf =

Algerian film critic and researcher

- شنتوف، عدة
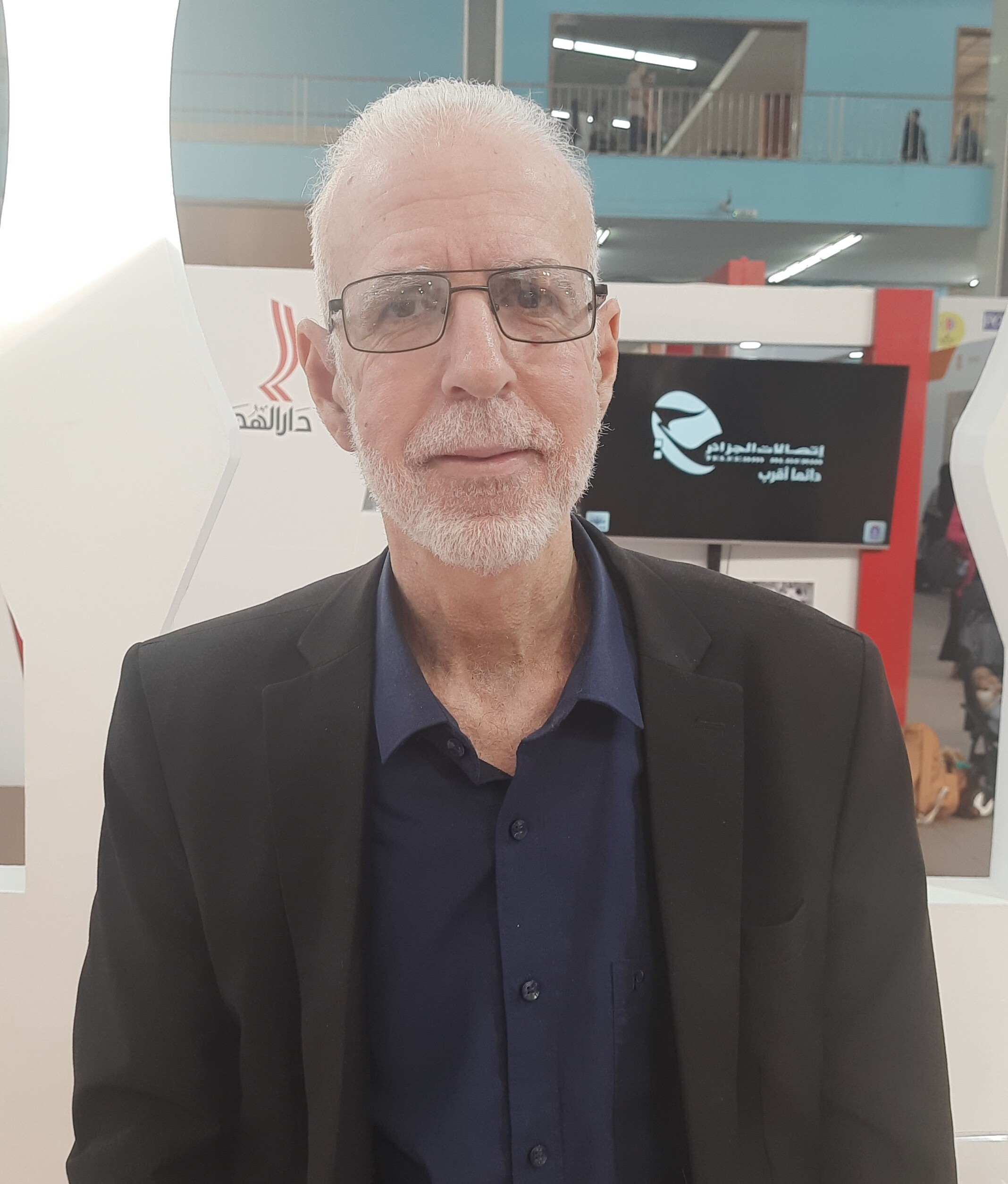
- Chentouf in 2025
- Born: 1961 (age 64–65); Mascara Province, Algeria
- Education: National School of Administration (Algeria)
- Occupations: Film critic, researcher, author
- Writing career
- Language: Arabic, French
- Genres: Essay, film criticism
- Notable works: Fondu au noir (2009); Le cinéma algérien, entre hier et aujourd’hui (2012); Le cinéma algérien et la guerre de libération nationale (2014); Dictionnaire du cinéma algérien (2017)

Signature
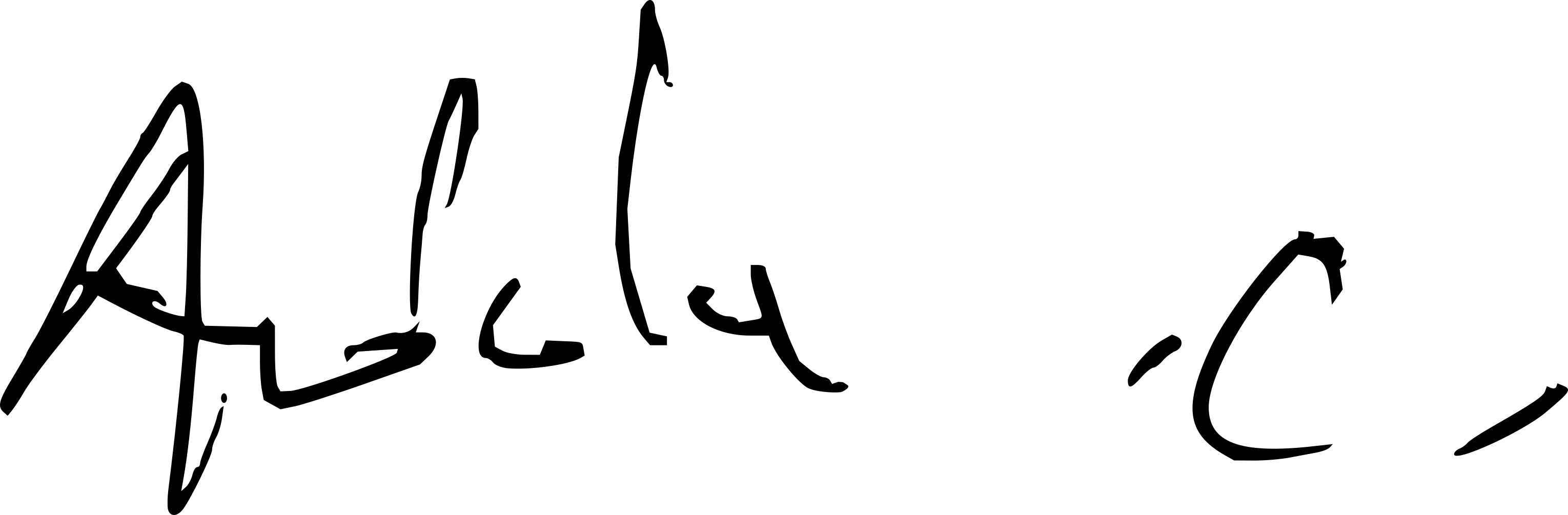

Adda Chentouf (born 1961 in Mascara, Algeria) is an Algerian film critic and researcher, specializing in the history of Algerian cinema.

== Biography ==
=== Early life and education ===
Adda Chentouf was born in 1961 in Mascara Province, Algeria. He graduated from the National School of Administration (Algeria).

=== Career ===
As a film enthusiast, he owns a collection of over 1,200 films on CD/DVD and approximately 700 posters, a testament to his commitment to preserving the memory of Algerian cinema.

== Works ==
- Fondu au noir — Volume 1. Oran: Dar El Gharb, 2009. 319 p. — (A panorama of a quarter-century of world cinema, 1970–1995). Preface by Jean-Paul Belmondo. ISBN 978-9961-54-277-4. ·
- Fondu au noir — Volume 2. Dar El Adib.
- 50 ans de cinéma en Algérie (1964–2014) — De la splendeur du passé au marasme actuel. Algiers: Dar El Adib, 2016. (Cited in academic works on Maghrebi cinema). ISBN 9789931518525.
- Le cinéma algérien et la guerre de libération nationale.
- Dictionnaire du cinéma algérien (Arabic: «دليل المخرجين والممثلين والتقنيين في السينما الجزائرية»). Algiers: Éditions ANEP, November 2017.
- Le cinéma algérien entre hier et aujourd'hui (in Arabic). Editions Dar El Gharb, Oran, 2012.

== Themes and style ==
Chentouf's work focuses on the history of Algerian cinema, particularly the period of the Algerian War of Independence, and on filmic memory. He aims to make this cultural heritage accessible to both students and the general public.

== Reception and impact ==
His 2017 Dictionnaire du cinéma algérien was received as a response to a long-standing editorial gap on Algerian cinema. During the "Cinema and Revolution Days" in Tissemsilt, one of his works was featured and honored.

== See also ==
- Cinema of Algeria
- List of Algerian films
