= Sid Ahmed Ghozali =

Prime Minister of Algeria from 1991 to 1992

- سيد أحمد غزالي
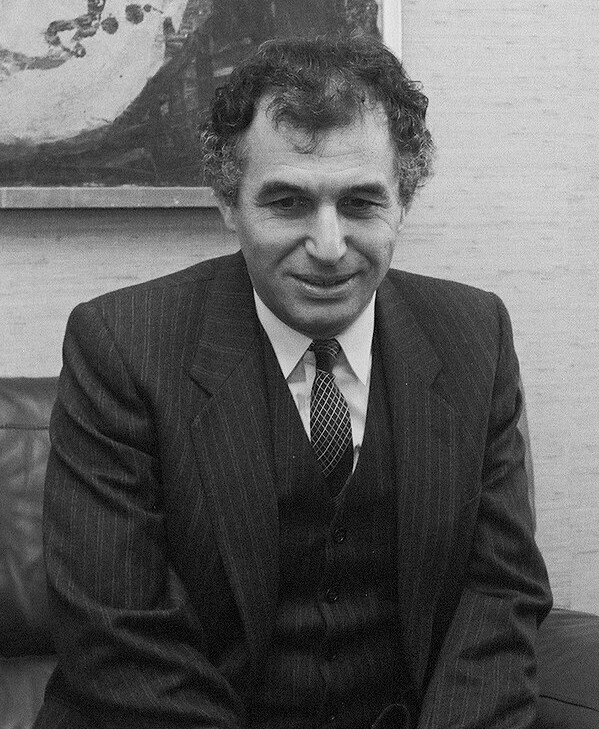

6th Prime Minister of Algeria
- In office 1991–1992
- President: Chadli Bendjedid
- Preceded by: Mouloud Hamrouche
- Succeeded by: Belaid Abdessalam

Minister of Foreign Affairs
- In office 1989–1991
- Prime Minister: Mouloud Hamrouche
- Preceded by: Boualem Bessaïh
- Succeeded by: Lakhdar Brahimi

Minister of Finance
- In office 1988–1989
- Prime Minister: Kasdi Merbah
- Preceded by: Hocine Benissad
- Succeeded by: Belaid Abdessalam

Personal details
- Born: 31 March 1937 Maghnia, French Algeria
- Died: 4 February 2025 (aged 87) Algiers, Algeria

Sid Ahmed Ghozali (Arabic: سيد أحمد غزالي, romanized: Sayyid Aḥmad Ghazzālī; 31 March 1937 – 4 February 2025) was an Algerian politician who was the Prime Minister of Algeria from 1991 to 1992.

== Life and career ==
Ghozali was a member of the National Liberation Front party and an ally of President Houari Boumedienne, under whom he served as head of Sonatrach from 1966 to 1977, when he became Minister of Energy and Industry. He was removed from this post by the new president Chadli Bendjedid in 1979, becoming ambassador to France, but was brought back in 1988 as Minister of Finance until 1989, then foreign minister until 1991. On 5 June 1991, he succeeded Mouloud Hamrouche as Prime Minister; he remained Prime Minister following the January 1992 resignation of Bendjedid and takeover by the military, but he resigned on 8 July that year, shortly after the assassination of Mohammed Boudiaf. He ran for president in the 1999 elections, and attempted to do so again in 2004, but was disqualified by the Constitutional Council.

Ghozali died in Algiers on 4 February 2025, at the age of 87.

== Honours ==
- Grand Cordon of the Order of the Rising Sun (2024)

== Sources ==
- Maroc-Hebdo
- L'Humanité

Political offices
Preceded by Mouloud Hamrouche	Head of Government of Algeria; 1991–1992	Succeeded by Belaid Abdessalam
