= Ramtane Lamamra =

Algerian politician and diplomat

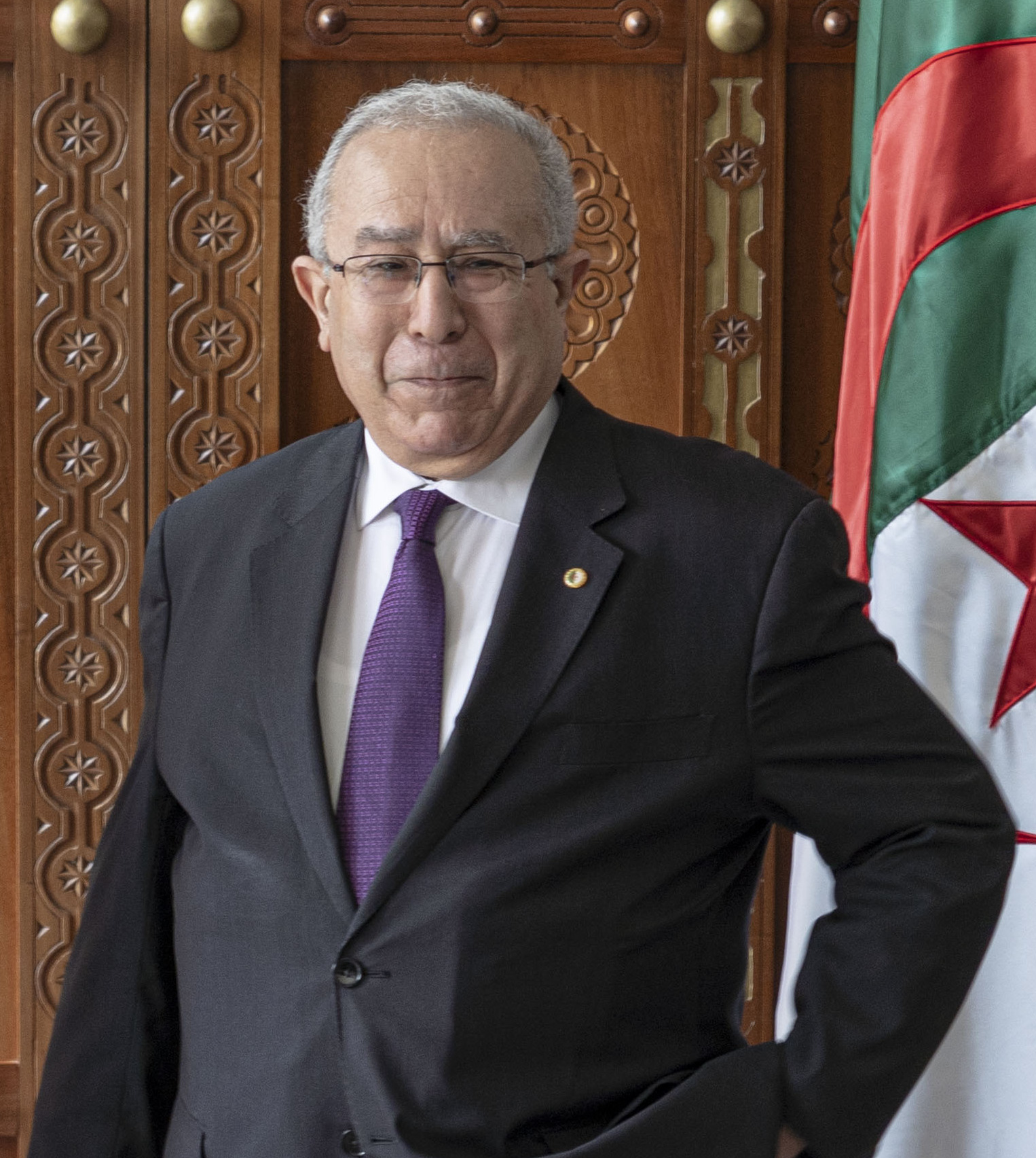
- Lamamra in 2022

Minister of Foreign Affairs
- In office 7 July 2021 – 18 March 2023
- President: Abdelmadjid Tebboune
- Prime Minister: Aymen Benabderrahmane
- Preceded by: Sabri Boukadoum
- Succeeded by: Ahmed Attaf
- In office 13 March 2019 – 31 March 2019
- President: Abdelaziz Bouteflika
- Prime Minister: Noureddine Bedoui
- Preceded by: Abdelkader Messahel
- Succeeded by: Sabri Boukadoum
- In office 11 September 2013 – 25 May 2017
- President: Abdelaziz Bouteflika
- Prime Minister: Abdelmalek Sellal
- Preceded by: Mourad Medelci
- Succeeded by: Abdelkader Messahel

Personal details
- Born: 15 June 1952 (age 74) Amizour, Algeria
- Education: National School of Administration

Ramtane Lamamra (Arabic: رمطان لعمامرة; born 15 June 1952) is an Algerian diplomat who was United Nations Secretary-General António Guterres' Personal Envoy for Sudan from 2023 to 2026.

Lamamra previously served as the African Union's Commissioner for Peace and Security from 2008 to 2013 and Minister of Foreign Affairs of Algeria from 2013 to 2017 and briefly in March 2019.

== Early life and education ==
Born at Amizour in Béjaïa Province, Lamamra studied at the École nationale d'administration in Algiers.

== Career ==
Lamamra was appointed Algeria's Ambassador to Ethiopia and Djibouti, as well the Organization of African Unity and the United Nations Economic Commission for Africa, in 1989. He was Chairman of the Board of Governors of the International Atomic Energy Agency from 1992 to 1993. Subsequently, he was appointed Algeria's Permanent Representative to the United Nations in 1993, and he served as Ambassador to the United States from 1996 to 1999.

From 1 August 2005 until 7 July 2007 he was Secretary-General of the Ministry of Foreign Affairs. He was elected as the African Union's Commissioner for Peace and Security in early 2008, taking office on 28 April 2008. He succeeded another Algerian diplomat, Said Djinnit, in that post.

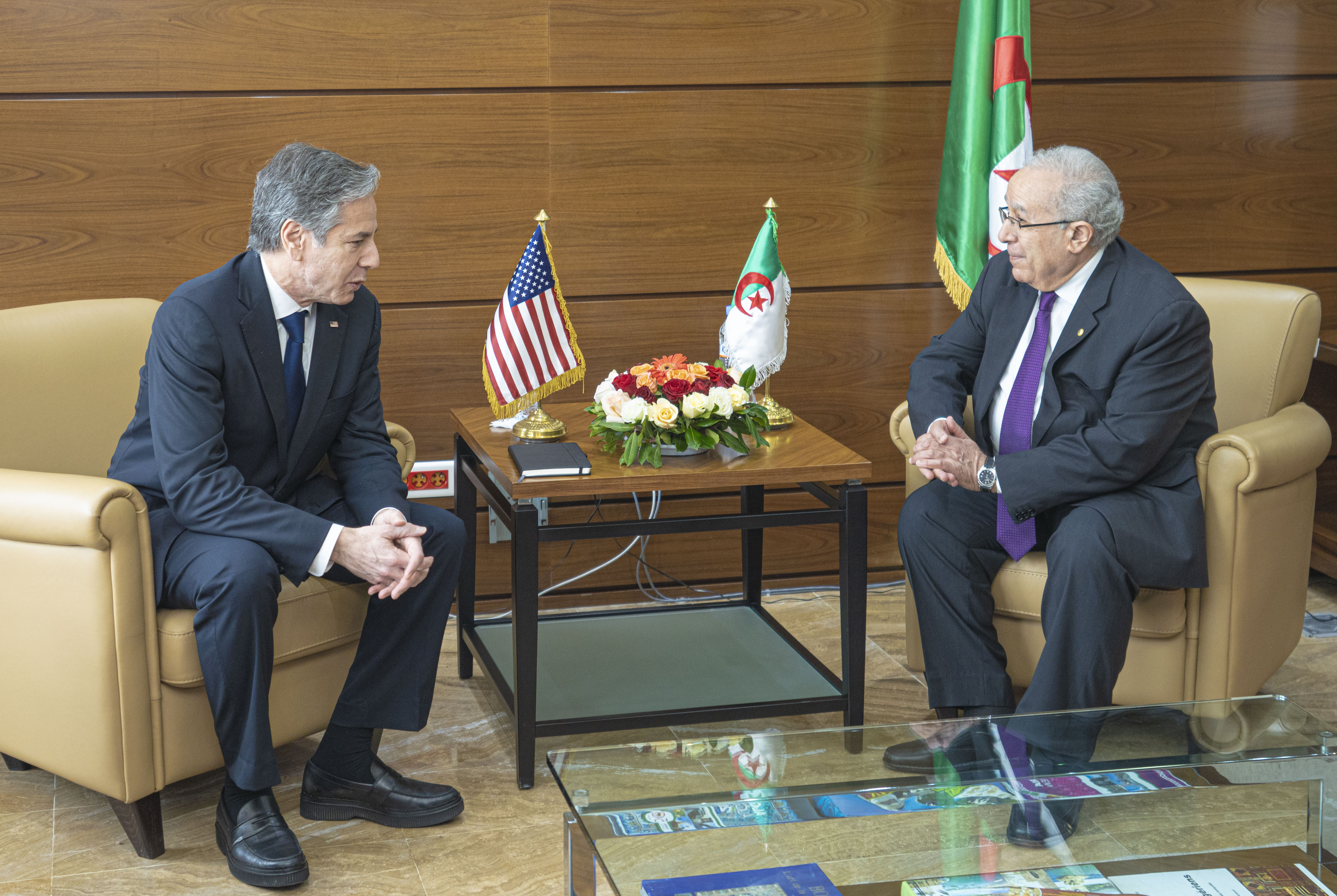
Lamamra with U.S. Secretary of State Antony Blinken in March 2022

Lamamra was appointed to the Algerian government as Minister of Foreign Affairs on 11 September 2013; consequently he left his post as AU Commissioner for Peace and Security.

After nearly four years as Minister of Foreign Affairs, Lamamra was dismissed from the government on 25 May 2017.

=== Later career ===
On 5 October 2017, Lamamra was appointed by the Chairperson of the African Union, Moussa Faki Mahamat, as the High Representative for Silencing the Guns in Africa. Recently, he also became a member of the High-Level Group of the Africa-Europe Foundation.

Since 2017, Lamamra has been a member of the High-level Advisory Board of the United Nations Secretary-General on Mediation. Between 2018 and 2021, he served as a Member of the African Union High-Level Implementation Panel for Sudan, South Sudan and the Horn of Africa.

On 7 July 2021, his return to the post of foreign minister was announced, as part of a cabinet reshuffle.

Lamamra is a member of the Cosmos Club and the University Club of Washington DC.

== Other activities ==
- Africa Europe Foundation (AEF), Member of the High-Level Group of Personalities on Africa-Europe Relations (since 2020)

== Honours ==
- Argentina: Grand Cross of Order of the Liberator General San Martin
- Niger: Commander of the National Order of the Niger
- Portugal : Commander of the Order of Merit

== See also ==
- List of ministers of foreign affairs of Algeria
- Foreign relations of Algeria

Political offices
| Preceded by Sabri Boukadoum | Minister of Foreign Affairs of Algeria; 2021–2023 | Succeeded by Ahmed Attaf |
| Preceded by Abdelkader Messahel | Minister of Foreign Affairs of Algeria; 2019 | Succeeded by Sabri Boukadoum |
| Preceded by Mourad Medelci | Minister of Foreign Affairs of Algeria; 2013–2017 | Succeeded by Abdelkader Messahel |
