= Abdelkader Messahel =

Algerian politician and diplomat

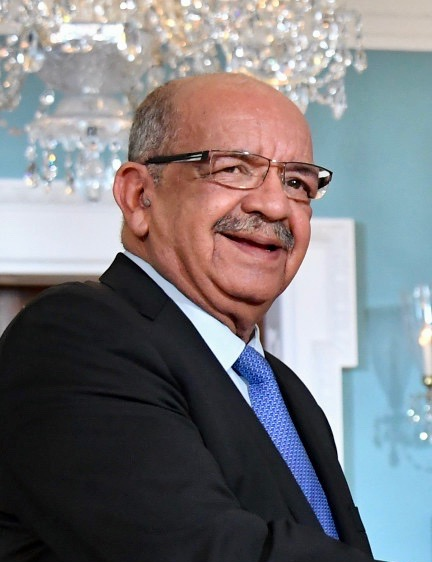

Minister of Foreign Affairs
- In office 25 May 2017 – 13 March 2019
- President: Abdelaziz Bouteflika
- Prime Minister: Abdelmalek Sellal; Ahmed Ouyahia
- Preceded by: Ramtane Lamamra (Foreign Affairs and International Cooperation); Himself (Maghreb African Affairs and Arab League)
- Succeeded by: Ramtane Lamamra

Secretary General of Arab Maghreb Union
- In office 5 May 2014 – 25 May 2017
- President: Abdelaziz Bouteflika
- Preceded by: Abdelmadjid Bouguerra
- Succeeded by: Position Abolished

Minister of Communication
- In office 21 September 2013 – 5 May 2014
- Preceded by: Position Established
- Succeeded by: Hamid Grine

Personal details
- Born: 11 July 1949 (age 76) Tlemcen, Algeria
- Party: National Rally for Democracy

Abdelkader Messahel (Arabic: عبد القادر مساهل) (born 11 July 1949) is a former Algerian journalist and Minister of Foreign Affairs of Algeria between 2017 and 2019.
