= Mohamed Bensalam =

Algerian minister for tourism in the 1995 government of Mokdad Sifi

Mohamed Bensalam was the Algerian minister for tourism in the 1995 government of Mokdad Sifi.
