= Saad Dahlab =

Algerian nationalist and politician (1918–2000)

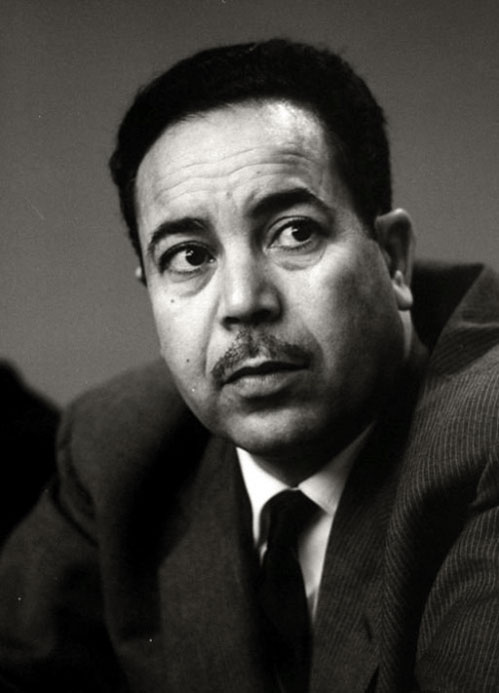

Minister of Foreign Affairs
- In office 9 August 1961 – 22 July 1962
- Prime Minister: Ahmed Ben Bella
- Preceded by: Krim Belkacem
- Succeeded by: Mohamed Khemisti

Personal details
- Born: 18 April 1918 Ksar Chellala, French Algeria
- Died: 16 December 2000 (aged 82) Algiers, Algeria
- Party: National Liberation Front

Saad Dahlab (April 18, 1918 – December 16, 2000) was an Algerian nationalist and politician. A long-time national activist, he played a part in virtually all the early Algerian nationalist movements: L'Étoile Nord-Africaine (ENA), the Parti du Peuple Algérien (PPA) and the Mouvement pour la Triomphe des Libertés Démocratiques (MTLD), all of them headed by Messali Hadj.

== Biography ==
He was jailed by France from 1945 to 1946.

After becoming part of the internal anti-Hadj opposition in the PPA-MTLD, he joined the emergent Front de libération nationale (FLN) splinter group, which began an armed rebellion in 1954. During the Algerian war of independence (1954–62), he was involved with the creation of El Moudjahid—the FLN bulletin that evolved into independent Algeria's main French language daily—as well as with radio transmissions and other propaganda efforts. He also served as minister of foreign affairs in the 1961-62 version of the group's exile government (the GPRA).

After independence in 1962 he served as the ambassador to Morocco, and pursued a career in business. In his later years, he started a publishing company, and among other things published his memoirs of the war years.
