= Salim Saadi =

Algerian soldier and politician (1936–2023)

Minister of the Interior and Local Government of Algeria
- In office August 21, 1993 – April 11, 1994
- Succeeded by: Abderrahmane Meziane Chérif

Personal details
- Born: February 3, 1936 Sétif, French Algeria (now Algeria)
- Died: June 26, 2023 (aged 87) Algiers, Algeria

Military service
- Battles/wars: Algerian War

Salim Saadi (Arabic: سليم سعدي; February 3, 1936 – June 26, 2023), also spelled Selim Saadi, was an Algerian politician and soldier.

== Biography ==
Saadi was born on February 3, 1936, in Sétif, Algeria. He initially began his career in the French army, but joined the FLN in 1959. After Algerian independence, Saadi held several positions within the Algerian government, notably serving as the Minister of the Interior during the early stages of the Algerian Civil War. He died on June 26, 2023, in Algiers.

== Political career ==
- 1979–1984: Minister of Agriculture
- 1984–1986: Minister of Heavy Industry
- 1993–1994: Minister of the Interior
- 1998–2001: Minister of Water Resources
- 2001–2002: Minister of Transport
