= Said Abadou =

Algerian politician (c.1935–2019)

Minister of Mujahideen
- In office 1995–1999
- President: Mokdad Sifi

Personal details
- Born: January 17, 1935 Biskra, French Algeria
- Died: June 12, 2019 (aged 84)
- Resting place: El Alia Cemetery, Algiers, Algeria
- Party: National Liberation Front

Said Abadou (عبادو السعيـد) (17 January 1935 – 12 June 2019) was an Algerian politician who served as a member of the People's National Assembly and as the Minister of Mujahideen from 1995 to 1999, in the government of Mokdad Sifi.

Born in Biskra, French Algeria, Abadou fought for the National Liberation Front during the Algerian War before being captured in 1965. He served as Secretary General of the National Organization of Mujahideen until his death in 2019.

== Biography ==
Said Abadou was born in Biskra, French Algeria, on 17 January 1935. He fought in the Algerian War as an officer in the National Liberation Front (FLN). In 1961, he was captured by the French army after a battle in Ghardaïa.

After Algeria gained its independence Abadou was the mouhafedh of the FLN in the wilayahs of Ouargla, Béchar, and Tiaret. He was elected to the People's National Assembly and was Minister of Mujahideen in Mokdad Sifi's government from 1994 to 1999.

Abadou served as Secretary General of the National Organization of Mujahideen (ONM) until his death. In 2009, he was critical of a French law compensating victims of its nuclear tests as its focused more on Polynesia than Algeria and he felt that the compensation was inadequate. He denied that any Harkis were killed after the Algerian War ended. In 2010, he stated that members of the Democratic National Rally were worse than French colonial settlers.

Abadou died on 12 June 2019, and was buried at the El Alia Cemetery in Algiers on 13 June. Mohand Ouamar Benlhad was appointed as the interim leader of the ONM after Abadou's death.

== Works cited ==
- "Algeria marks 50 years since France cease-fire". KTAR-FM. 19 March 2012. Archived from the original on 16 June 2025.
- "General-Secretary of the Mudjahidin Organization: France must assume all its responsibilities". Echorouk El Yawmi. 27 June 2009. Archived from the original on 16 June 2025.
- "Le Secrétaire général de l'Organisation nationale des moudjahidine Saïd Abadou n'est plus". Radio Algeria. 13 June 2019. Archived from the original on 16 June 2025.
- "Said Abadou yewweḍ leɛfu n Yuc: Lezzayer iṛuḥ-as yiwen seg yizamulen n Tegrawla n Wamber". Algeria Press Service. 14 June 2019. Archived from the original on 16 June 2025.
- Boufatah, Mohamed (21 October 2010). "Saïd Abadou tire à boulets rouges sur le RND". L'Expression.
