= Lakhdar Brahimi =

Algerian United Nations diplomat (born 1934)

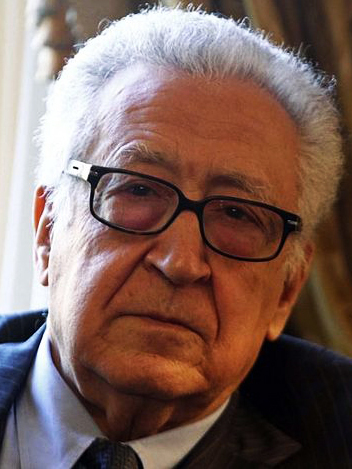

Minister of Foreign Affairs
- In office 5 June 1991 – 3 February 1993
- Prime Minister: Sid Ahmed Ghozali; Belaid Abdessalam
- Preceded by: Sid Ahmed Ghozali
- Succeeded by: Redha Malek

United Nations and Arab League Envoy to Syria
- In office 1 September 2012 – 31 May 2014
- Secretary General: Ban Ki-moon (UN); Nabil Elaraby (AL)
- Preceded by: Kofi Annan
- Succeeded by: Staffan de Mistura

Personal details
- Born: 1 January 1934 (age 92) El Azizia, French Algeria
- Party: National Liberation Front
- Spouse: Mila Bacic Brahimi
- Children: Salah Brahimi; Princess Rym Ali; Salem Brahimi
- Relatives: Prince Ali bin Hussein of Jordan (son-in-law)
- Education: University of Algiers

Lakhdar Brahimi (Algerian pronunciation: [læxdˤɑr bræhiːmi]; Arabic: الأخضر الإبراهيمي; al-Akhḍar al-Ibrāhīmi; born 1 January 1934) is an Algerian United Nations diplomat who served as the United Nations and Arab League Special Envoy to Syria until 14 May 2014. He was Minister of Foreign Affairs of Algeria from 1991 to 1993. He served as chairman of the United Nations Panel on United Nations Peace Operations in 2000. Its highly influential report "Report of the Panel on United Nations Peacekeeping" is known as "The Brahimi Report".

He is also a member of The Elders, a group of world leaders working for global peace. Brahimi is a member of the Commission on Legal Empowerment of the Poor, the first global initiative to focus specifically on the link between exclusion, poverty and law. He has also been a Member of the Global Leadership Foundation since 2008, an organization which works to promote good governance around the world. He is currently a distinguished senior fellow at the Centre for the Study of Global Governance at the London School of Economics and Political Science, and a governing board member of the Stockholm International Peace Research Institute. He relinquished his post as UN Special Envoy to Syria on 31 May 2014.

== Early life and education ==
Brahimi was born in 1934 in El Azizia near Tablat, Algeria, about 60 km south of Algiers. He was educated in Algeria and in France where he studied law and political science. He joined the campaign for independence in 1956. Based in Jakarta for five years, he was the representative of the National Liberation Front (Algeria) in South East Asia, touring the region in search of diplomatic support.

== Career ==
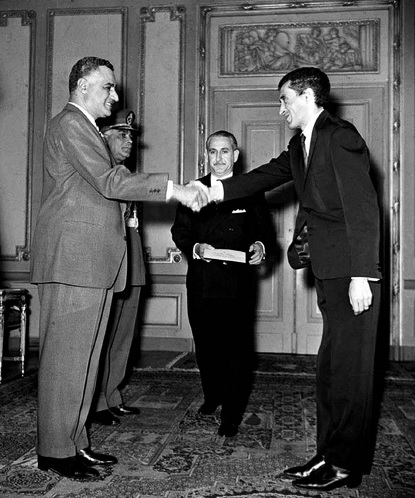
Brahimi (right) as the Algerian Ambassador to Egypt, shaking hands with Gamal Abdel Nasser, the Egyptian President, after presenting his credentials to the president (Cairo, April 1963).

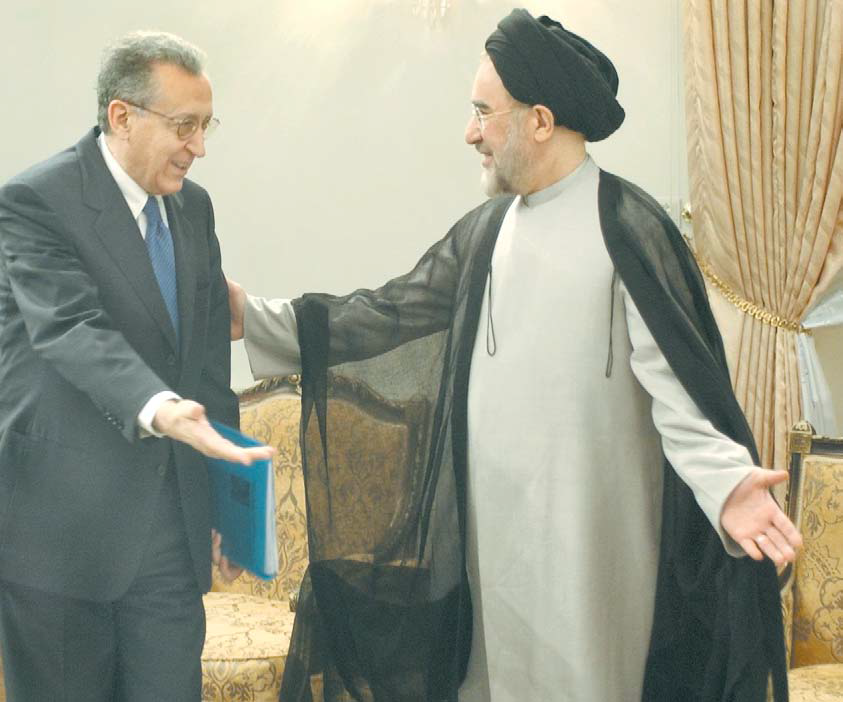
Brahimi (left) as United Nations special mission to Afghanistan, visit President Mohammad Khatami (Tehran, 4 August 2003).

Brahimi was the United Nations special representative for Afghanistan and Iraq. Before his appointment in 2001 by the Secretary-General, Kofi Annan, he had served the U.N. as special representative to Haiti where he narrowly escaped an assassination attempt. Brahimi facilitated the first American UN Force Commander since their involvement in the Korean War. Before coming to the U.N., Brahimi, who represented the National Liberation Front in Tunis during Algeria's independence movement in 1956–1961, was an Arab League official (1984–1991) and the Algerian Minister for Foreign Affairs from 1991 until 1993. Brahimi was also chair of the Panel on United Nations Peace Operations, which produced the influential Brahimi Report.

On a visit to Baghdad in April 2004 to help determine how and when Iraqi elections can be held, he said that the recent violence threatened to delay Iraqi national assembly elections—the national assembly is to pick the president and write a constitution.

"The elections scheduled to take place in January 2005 are the most important milestone," Brahimi said. "There is no substitute for the legitimacy that comes from free and fair elections." (Witter, 2004)

Brahimi suggested that the Iraq Interim Governing Council be dissolved and that most of its members should not have any role in the new government. Though the council was in fact dissolved early, some of its members did have major roles in the ensuing government. The president, one of the two vice-presidents, and the prime minister in the following government all served on the council. Most prominently, Brahimi's criticism of Ahmed Chalabi has led to Chalabi's claim that Brahimi is an Arab nationalist who should have no role in determining the future of Iraq. At the same time, close allies of Chalabi have been pushing claims that various world leaders and the UN took bribes from Saddam Hussein under the Oil for Food program.

In May 2004, Brahimi was supposed to play a largely advisory role in the appointment of candidates, which ended up selecting as Iraq's new interim President and Prime Minister: Ghazi Mashal Ajil al-Yawer and Iyad Allawi, respectively. However, Brahimi expressed serious disappointment and frustration about his role. "Bremer is the dictator of Iraq, He has the money. He has the signature. ... I will not say who was my first choice, and who was not my first choice ... I will remind you that the Americans are governing this country." According to a person who spoke with him, "He was very disappointed, very frustrated," al Dulame said. "I asked him why he didn't say that publicly (and) he said, 'I am the U.N. envoy to Iraq, how can I admit to failure?'" Brahimi announced his resignation, resulting from "great difficulties and frustration experienced during his assignment in Iraq", at the UN in New York on 12 June. While serving as the United Nations envoy to Iraq, he described Israel's policy towards the Palestinians as "the big poison in the region".

On 5 February 2008, the UN Secretary-General, Ban Ki-moon, appointed Brahimi to lead a panel investigation on United Nations staff security in the wake of the Algiers bombings of 11 December 2007. He was one of the founders of the French language Journal of Palestine Studies called La revue d'étude palestinienne.

On 17 August 2012, Brahimi was appointed by the United Nations as the new peace envoy to Syria, replacing Kofi Annan.

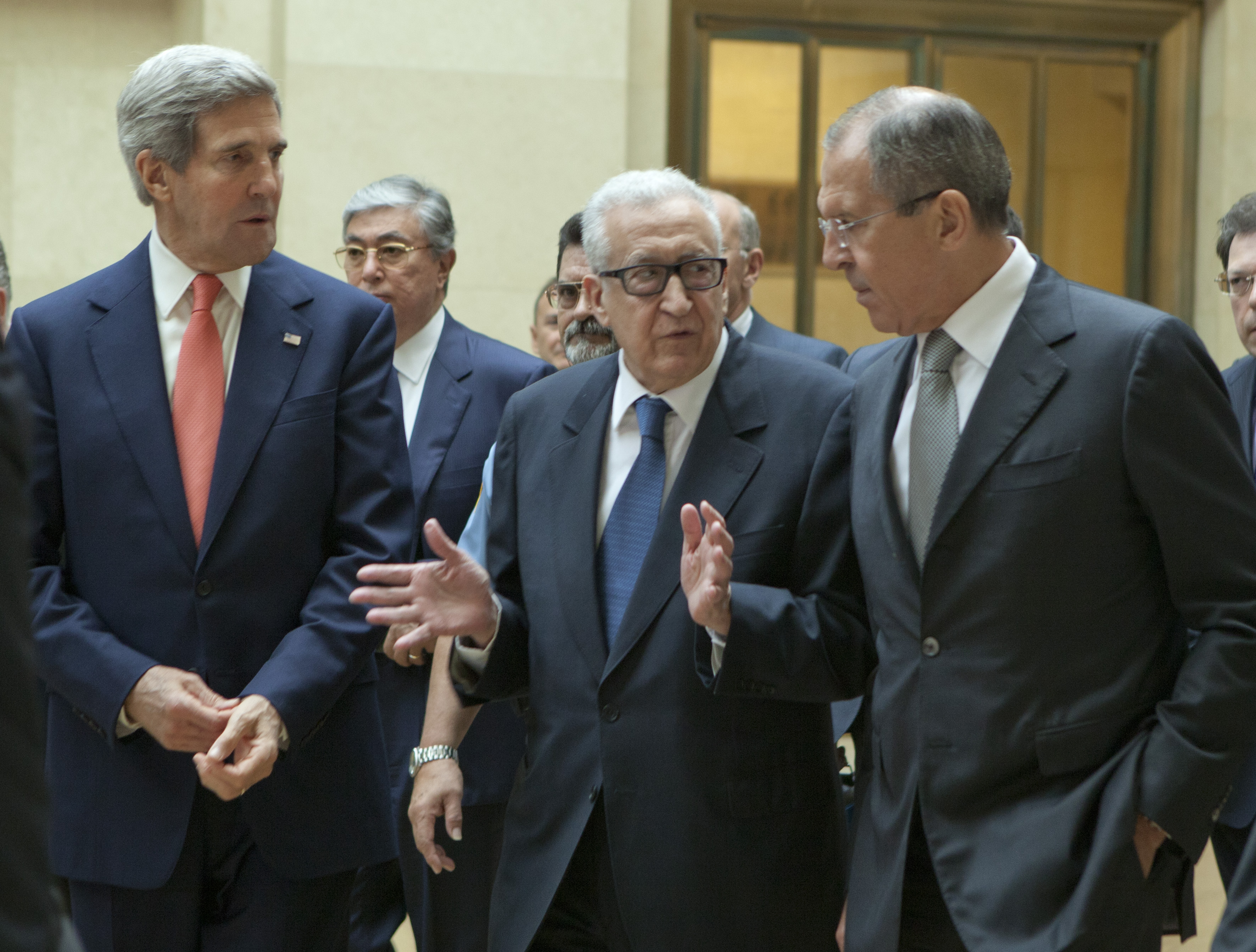
Lakhdar Brahimi with John Kerry and Sergey Lavrov (Geneva, September 13, 2013).

On 13 May 2014, UN Secretary-General Ban Ki-moon announced that Brahimi would resign as the special envoy to Syria on 31 May 2014.

Brahimi addressed a police academy in December 2016, expressing his wish that Algeria and Morocco should “leave the Sahara issue aside in an effort to build a communal economy based on exchange.” His statement caused shockwaves in Algeria.

In March 2019, he was mandated by Abdelaziz Bouteflika to preside over the national conference that was to propose a new constitution and set the date of the presidential election.

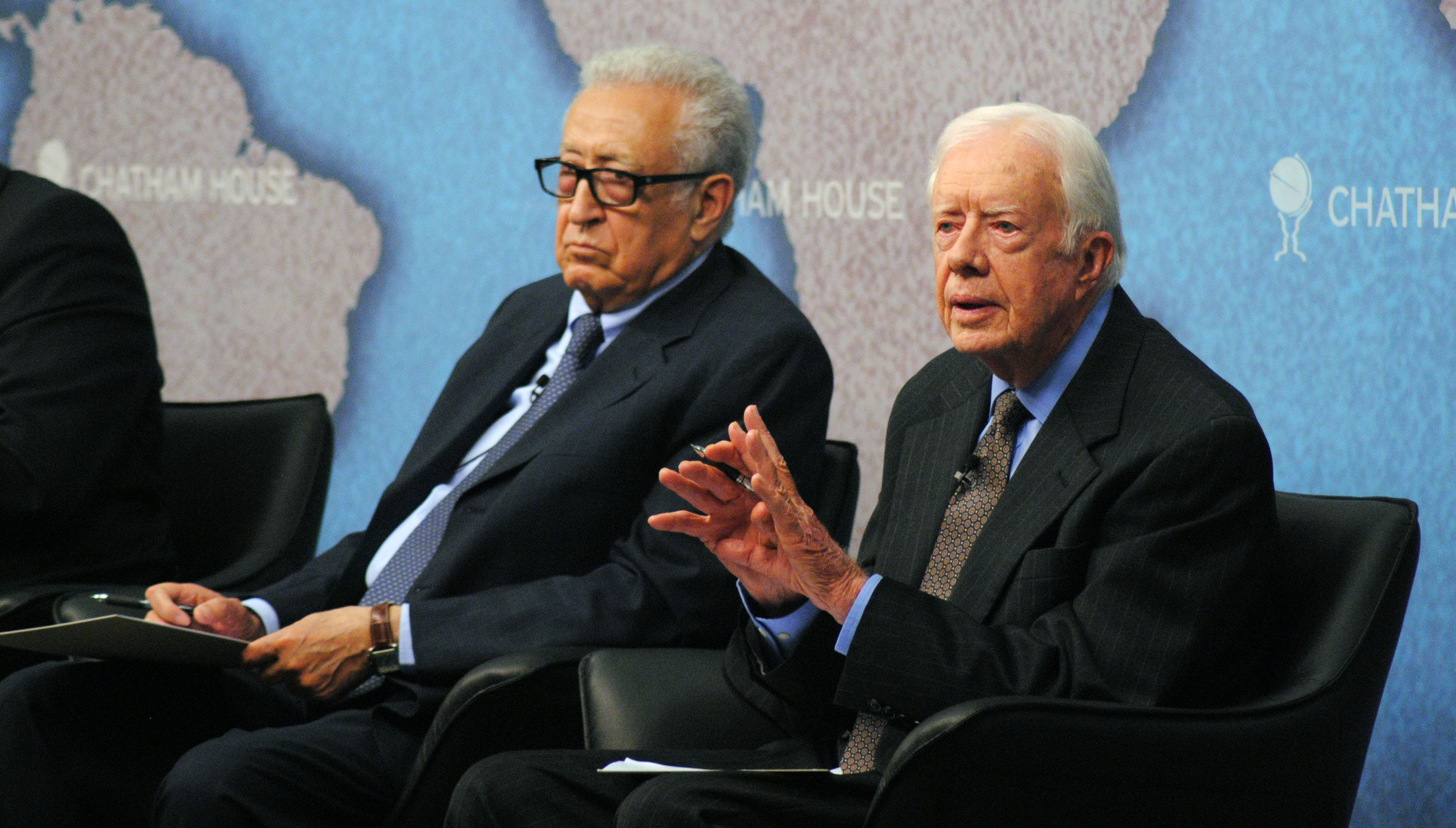
Lakhdar Brahimi and Jimmy Carter (New York, 24 July 2013)

Brahimi was one of the founding members of The Elders in 2007, an independent group of global leaders working for peace, justice, human rights and a sustainable planet. He became an Elder Emeritus in 2021.

== Career history ==
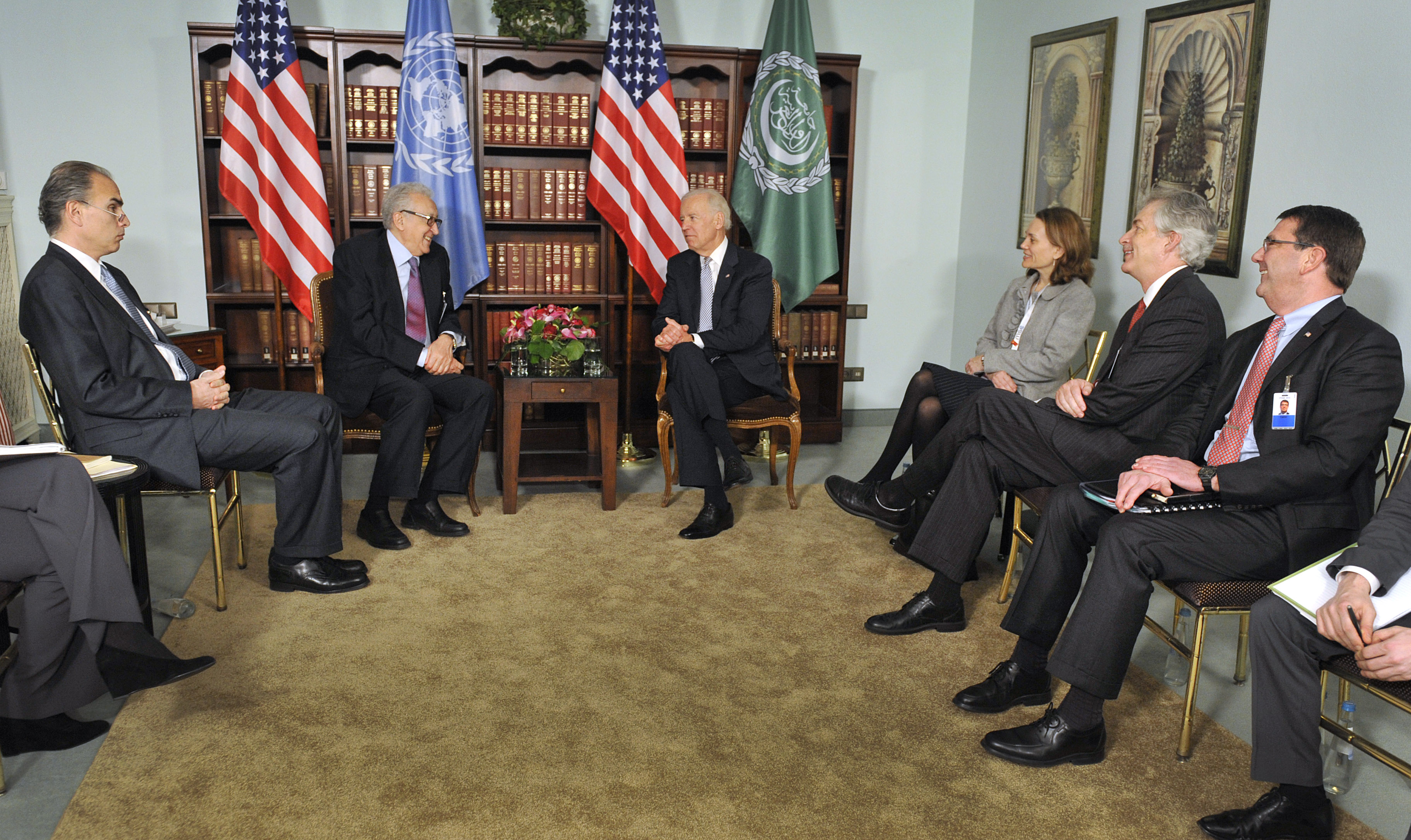
Lakhdar Brahimi with Joe Biden (Munich, 7 February 2013)

- National Liberation Front Representative to Indonesia: 1956–1961
- Ambassador to Egypt, Sudan and the Arab League: 1963–1970
- Ambassador to the United Kingdom: 1971–1979
- Diplomatic Adviser to the President: 1982–1984
- Undersecretary General of the Arab League: 1984–1991
- Arab League Special Envoy for Lebanon: 1989–1991
- Foreign Minister of Algeria: 5 June 1991 – 3 February 1993
- Rapporteur to the Earth Summit: 3 June 1992 – 14 June 1992
- United Nations Special Envoy for South Africa: December 1993 – June 1994
- United Nations Special Envoy for Haiti: 1994–1996
- From 1996-1997, he also undertook a series of special missions to Zaire, Cameroon, Yemen, Burundi, Angola, Liberia, Nigeria, Sudan and Côte d'Ivoire on behalf of the United Nations.
- United Nations Special Envoy for Afghanistan: July 1997 – October 1999
- Chairperson of the Independent Panel on United Nations Peace Operations: 7 March 2000 – 17 August 2000
- United Nations Special Envoy for Afghanistan: 3 October 2001 – 31 December 2004
- Chairperson of the Bonn Conference: 24 November 2001 – 5 December 2001
- Special Adviser and Undersecretary General of the United Nations: 2004–2005
- United Nations Special Envoy for Iraq: 1 January 2004 – 12 June 2004
- Visiting Professor of the Institute for Advanced Study: 2006–2008
- Member of The Elders: 2007–present
- Chairperson of the Independent Panel on Safety and Security of United Nations Personnel and Premises Worldwide: 5 February 2008 – 9 June 2008
- United Nations and Arab League Special Envoy for Syria: 2012–2014

== Honours and awards ==
=== Honours ===
- Algeria: First Class of the National Order of Merit
- Chile: Grand Cross of the Order of Merit
- Jordan: Grand Cordon of the Supreme Order of the Renaissance
- South Africa: Grand Officer of the Order of Good Hope
- Tunisia: Commander of the Order of the Republic
- USA: Medal of the Four Freedoms Award
- Yemen: Collar of the Order of the Unity

=== Awards ===
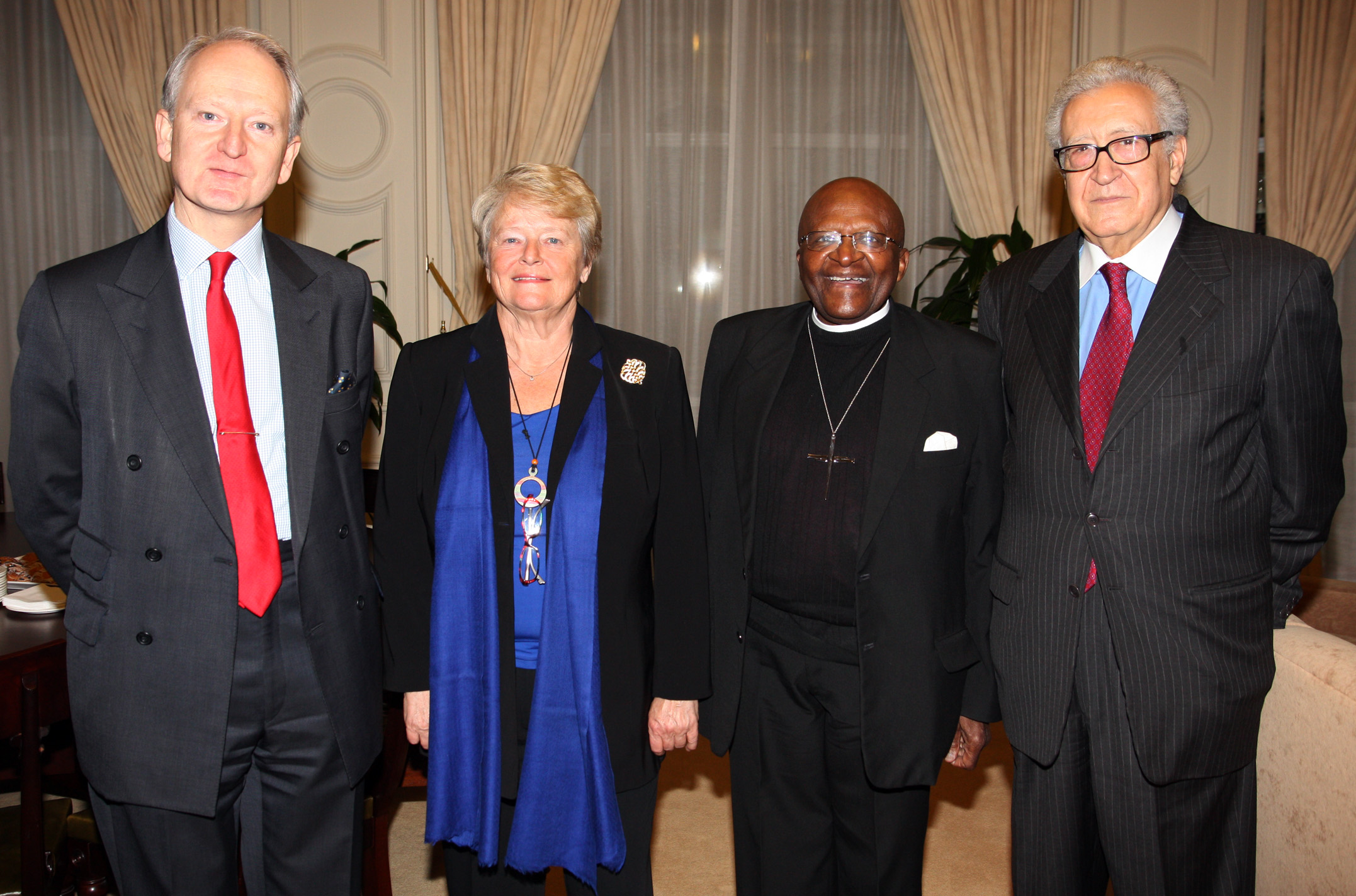
Lakhdar Brahimi with Desmond Tutu, Gro Harlem Brundtland and Henry Bellingham, Baron Bellingham (London, 10 February 2011).

- 2016: Human Rights Prize of the National Consultative Commission for the Promotion and Protection of Human Rights (France)
- 2016: Emir Abdelkader Prize for Living Together
- 2014: Wateler Peace Prize
- 2011: Laureate of the Special Jury Prize for Conflict Prevention laureate of the Special Jury Prize awarded by the Fondation Chirac
- 2006: Hesse Peace Prize
- 2004: Dag Hammarskjöld Medal of Honor

=== Honorary degrees ===
- 2018: Waseda University
- 2017: University of Ottawa
- 2017: University of Algiers
- 2016: Sciences Po

== Personal life ==
Brahimi is fluent in Arabic, French and English.

He is married to Mila Bacic Brahimi, and has three children: Salah Brahimi is the CEO of Grey Matter International, a consultant company, located in Washington, DC, where he lives with his wife, Dr. Doaa Taha, and his two children; Princess Rym Ali, who was a CNN correspondent in Baghdad during the 2003 Iraq War, is married to Prince Ali bin Hussein. She lives in Amman, Jordan, with her husband and two children, Jalila and Abdullah ibn Ali; and Salem Brahimi, who lives in Paris, France, just a block away from his parents, with his wife Lawrence Brahimi, and his two children.

== Published works ==
- Afghanistan: Negotiating Peace, New York, The Century Foundation Press, 2012.
- Arab–Israeli conflict (collective work), Beirut, American University of Beirut, 2010.
- Guerres d'Aujourd'hui : Pourquoi ces conflits ? Peut on les résoudre ? (collectif work), Paris, Delavilla, 2008.
- Étude d'ensemble de toute la question des opérations de maintien de la paix sous tous leurs aspects, New York, Nations Unis, 2003.
- Rapport du Groupe d'étude sur les opérations de paix de l'ONU, New York, Nations Unis, 2000.

Political offices
Preceded by Sid Ahmed Ghozali	Minister of Foreign Affairs; 1991–1993	Succeeded by Redha Malek
Positions in intergovernmental organisations
Preceded by Kofi Annan	United Nations and Arab League Envoy to Syria; 2012–2014	Succeeded by Staffan de Mistura
