= Abdelaziz Belkhadem =

Prime Minister of Algeria from 2006 to 2008

- عبد العزيز بلخادم
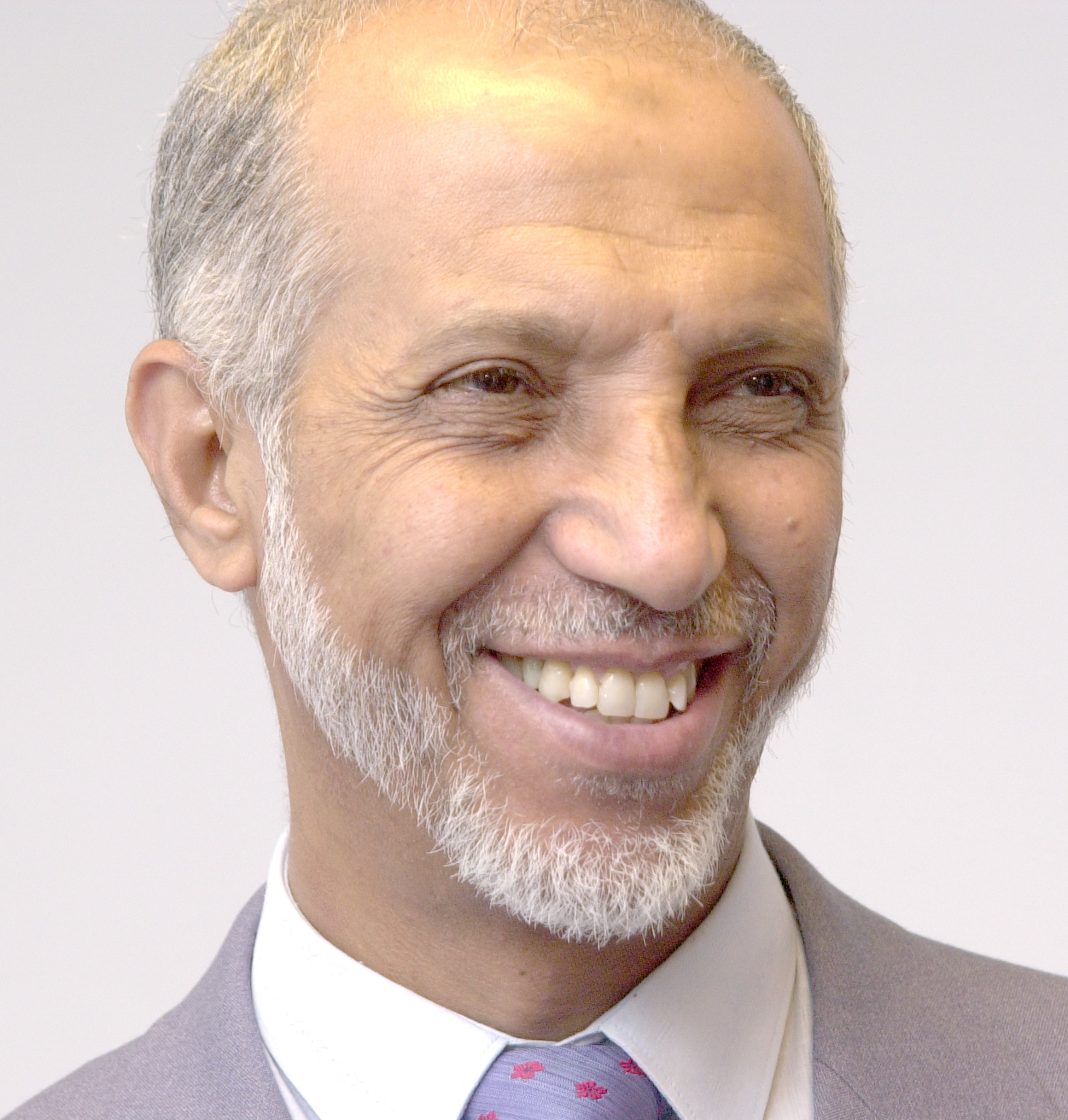
- Belkhadem in 2002

14th Prime Minister of Algeria
- In office 24 May 2006 – 23 June 2008
- President: Abdelaziz Bouteflika
- Preceded by: Ahmed Ouyahia
- Succeeded by: Ahmed Ouyahia

Minister of Foreign Affairs
- In office 2000–2005
- President: Abdelaziz Bouteflika
- Prime Minister: Ali Benflis; Ahmed Ouyahia
- Preceded by: Youcef Yousfi
- Succeeded by: Mohammed Bedjaoui

Personal details
- Born: 8 November 1945 (age 80) Aflou, Laghouat, Algeria
- Party: FLN

Abdelaziz Belkhadem (/ɑːbdəlɑːˈziːz bəlˈkɑːdəm/; Arabic: عبد العزيز بلخادم; born 8 November 1945) is an Algerian politician who was Prime Minister of Algeria from 2006 to 2008. He was also Secretary-General of the National Liberation Front (FLN). Belkhadem served as Minister of Foreign Affairs from 2000 to 2005 and Personal Representative of President Abdelaziz Bouteflika from 2005 to 2006; after serving as prime minister from 2006 to 2008, he was again appointed Personal Representative of the Head of State in 2008.

== Political career ==
Belkhadem was born in Aflou, Laghouat Province, Algeria. A graduate in literature and economics, he began his professional life in 1964 as a financial inspector and later was a professor of Arabic literature. In 1972, President Houari Boumédiène appointed him as Deputy Director of International Relations at the Presidency, and he held that post until 1977.

As an FLN candidate, Belkhadem was elected to the People's National Assembly (APN) in 1977 from Sougueur in Tiaret, and was re-elected as a Deputy from Sougueur in 1982 and 1987. During his time as a Deputy, he was rapporteur of the APN's Planning and Finance Committee before being elected as President of the Education, Training, and Scientific Research Committee in 1987. He was Vice-President of the APN from 1988 to 1990 and President of the APN from October 1990 to 1992. Belkhadem was a member of the Political Bureau of the FLN from 1991 to 1997.

Later, Belkhadem was Minister of State for Foreign Affairs from July 2000 to May 2005. As Foreign Minister, he visited Paris in July 2002 to discuss cooperation with French Foreign Minister Dominique de Villepin. He was Minister of State and Personal Representative of the Head of State (President Abdelaziz Bouteflika) from May 2005 to May 2006. He was appointed prime minister on 24 May 2006, replacing Ahmed Ouyahia.

One of two bombings in Algiers on 11 April 2007 struck near Belkhadem's office. He was not harmed in the attack and condemned the bombings as "criminal and cowardly". At least 23 people were reported killed in the two bombings.

Following the May 2007 parliamentary election, Belkhadem presented the pro forma resignation of his government, and it was accepted by President Bouteflika on 1 June. Belkhadem remained in office in a caretaker capacity, along with 11 ministers; the remaining 15, who won parliamentary seats in the election, were required to choose between those seats and their positions as ministers. Bouteflika reappointed Belkhadem as Prime Minister in a new government on 4 June.

Bouteflika appointed Ouyahia as prime minister on 23 June 2008, replacing Belkhadem, who was instead appointed for a second time as Minister of State and Personal Representative of President Bouteflika.

== See also ==
- Cabinet of Algeria

Political offices
| Preceded by Ahmed Ouyahia | Prime Minister of Algeria; 2006 – 2008 | Succeeded by Ahmed Ouyahia |
