= Abderrahmane Meziane Chérif =

Algerian politician

Minister of the Interior of Algeria
- In office April 11, 1994 – July 2, 1995
- Preceded by: Salim Saadi
- Succeeded by: Mostefa Benmansour

Wali of Algiers Province
- In office August 21, 1991 – 1992
- Preceded by: Mohamed Ouahcène Oussedik
- Succeeded by: Ahmed Horri

Personal details
- Born: 1938 (age 87–88) El Eulma, French Algeria (now Algeria)
- Other political affiliations: FLN

Abderrahmane Meziane Chérif is a former Algerian politician who has served as wali of several Algerian provinces since 1979, the Algerian Minister of the Interior between 1994 and 1995, and the Algerian ambassador to the Czech Republic between 1995 and 2004.

== Biography ==
Chérif was born in El Eulma in 1938, and moved to Avignon, France when he was 17. When in France, he was recruited by French underground FLN networks, and took part in the attack against the Mourepiane oil depot in France. He was sentenced to death, but was acquitted due to the Évian Accords. When Algeria gained independence, Chérif was appointed an executive in the Ministry of the Interior. Chérif was then appointed director of energy and industry in Algiers Province between 1971 and 1979.

Chérif was appointed as the wali of several Algerian provinces between 1979 and 1992. He served as the wali of Djelfa Province between 1979 and 1980, the wali of Béjaïa Province between 1981 and 1985, wali of Guelma Province between 1985 and 1989, wali of Aïn Defla between 1989 and 1990, and finally wali of Algiers Province between 1991 and 1992.

Between 1992 and 1994, Chérif served as the consul-general of Algeria in Frankfurt, Germany. Between 1994 and 1995, he served as Minister of the Interior, Local Authorities, Environment, and Administrative Reform. Chérif then served as the Algerian ambassador to the Czech Republic between 1995 and 2004, and subsequently the consul-general of Algeria in Paris, France.

== Bibliography ==
- 2010: L'armée des ombres : La guerre d'Algérie en France
