= Amar Sakhri =

Algerian politician

Amar Sakhri was the minister of education for Algeria in the 1995 government of Mokdad Sifi.
