= Sassi Aziz =

Algerian politician

Sassi Aziz was the Algerian minister for trade in the 1995 government of Mokdad Sifi.
