= Boubakour Benbouzid =

Minister of higher education for Algeria

Boubakour Benbouzid was the minister of higher education for Algeria in the 1995 government of Mokdad Sifi.
