= Mostefa Benmansour =

Minister of the Interior, Local Authorities, and the Environment
- In office July 2, 1995 – December 15, 1998
- Preceded by: Abderrahmane Meziane Chérif
- Succeeded by: Abdelmalek Sellal

Personal details
- Born: November 17, 1944 (age 81) El Keurt, Mascara Province, French Algeria
- Education: National School of Administration, Algiers

Mostefa Benmansour is an Algerian politician who served as the Algerian Minister of the Interior twice between July and November 1995 and between January 1996 and December 1998. Benmansour also served as the Algerian Minister of Foreign Affairs between November 1995 and January 1996, and as the wali of Tizi Ouzou, Annaba and El Bayadh.

== Biography ==
Benmansour was born on November 17, 1944, in El Keurt, Mascara Province, French Algeria. He graduated from the National School of Administration of Algeria, with his first position being an administrator at the Ministry of Commerce in 1968. He then joined the Ministry of the Interior in 1971, and in 1978 Benmansour was appointed as the head of El Milia District in Jijel Province. He then served as the secretary-general of Ghardaïa Province from 1984 to 1989.

Benmansour was then appointed as the wali of El Bayadh province from 1989 to 1990, wali of Tizi Ouzou province from 1991 to 1994, and wali of Annaba province from 1994 to 1995. Benmansour was briefly appointed as the Minister of the Interior, Local Authorities, Environmental and Administrative Reform from July 2 to November 27, 1995. Under Benmansour's tenure, Amnesty International considered him considered complicit in the detainment and possible torture of Algerian journalists Saghir Bouhadida and Djamleddine Fahassi. He was then transferred as the Minister of Foreign Affairs, where he served from 1995 to January 5, 1996.

He then served again as the Minister of the Interior from January 5, 1996, to December 15, 1998. Benmansour was part of a coalition of seven Islamist members to be appointed to government positions amidst the Algerian Civil War. Benmansour visited the villages of Sidi Hamed and Haouche Sahrouai following the Sidi-Hamed massacre in January 1998, where the GIA killed hundreds of civilians.
