= Redha Malek =

Algerian politician (1931–2017)

- رضا مالك
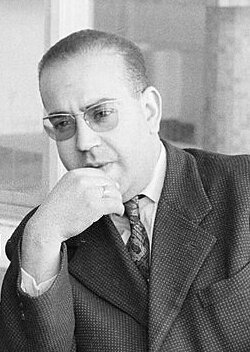
- Malek in 1961

Prime Minister of Algeria
- In office 21 August 1993 – 11 April 1994
- President: Ali Kafi; Liamine Zeroual
- Preceded by: Belaid Abdessalam
- Succeeded by: Mokdad Sifi

Minister of Foreign Affairs
- In office 3 February 1993 – 21 August 1993
- President: Ali Kafi
- Prime Minister: Belaid Abdessalam
- Preceded by: Lakhdar Brahimi
- Succeeded by: Mohamed Salah Dembri

Minister of Information and Culture
- In office 1977–1979
- President: Houari Boumédiène; Rabah Bitat

Personal details
- Born: 21 December 1931 Batna, French Algeria
- Died: 29 July 2017 (aged 85) Algiers, Algeria

Redha Malek (Arabic: رضا مالك) (21 December 1931 – 29 July 2017) was an Algerian politician who served as Prime Minister of Algeria from 21 August 1993 to 11 April 1994. During his short term of office, which came in the early years of the Algerian Civil War, he pursued a hardline anti-Islamist policy and successfully negotiated debt relief with the International Monetary Fund (IMF), following the implementation of an IMF reform plan. He was known for his support of a free market economy.

== Biography ==
He was born in Batna on 21 December 1931 and was editor of the FLN newspaper El Moudjahid between 1957 and 1962, during the Algerian War of Independence (1954–62). After 1963, he was sent as ambassador to Yugoslavia, France, the Soviet Union, the United States (1979–82), and the United Kingdom; he also briefly became Minister of Information and Culture (1977–79) and later Foreign Minister (3 February – 21 August 1993). He later became head of a minor political party, the National Republican Alliance (ANR), founded on 5 May 1995 shortly after a presidential election.

He died on 29 July 2017, at the age of 85 after a long illness.

== Books ==
- L'Algerie a Evian: Histoire des négociations secretes, 1956-1962 (L'epreuve des faits); ISBN 2-02-023898-5

Political offices
Preceded by Belaid Abdessalam	Prime Minister of Algeria; 1993–1994	Succeeded by Mokdad Sifi
