= Ahmed Attaf =

Algerian politician and diplomat

- أحمد عطاف
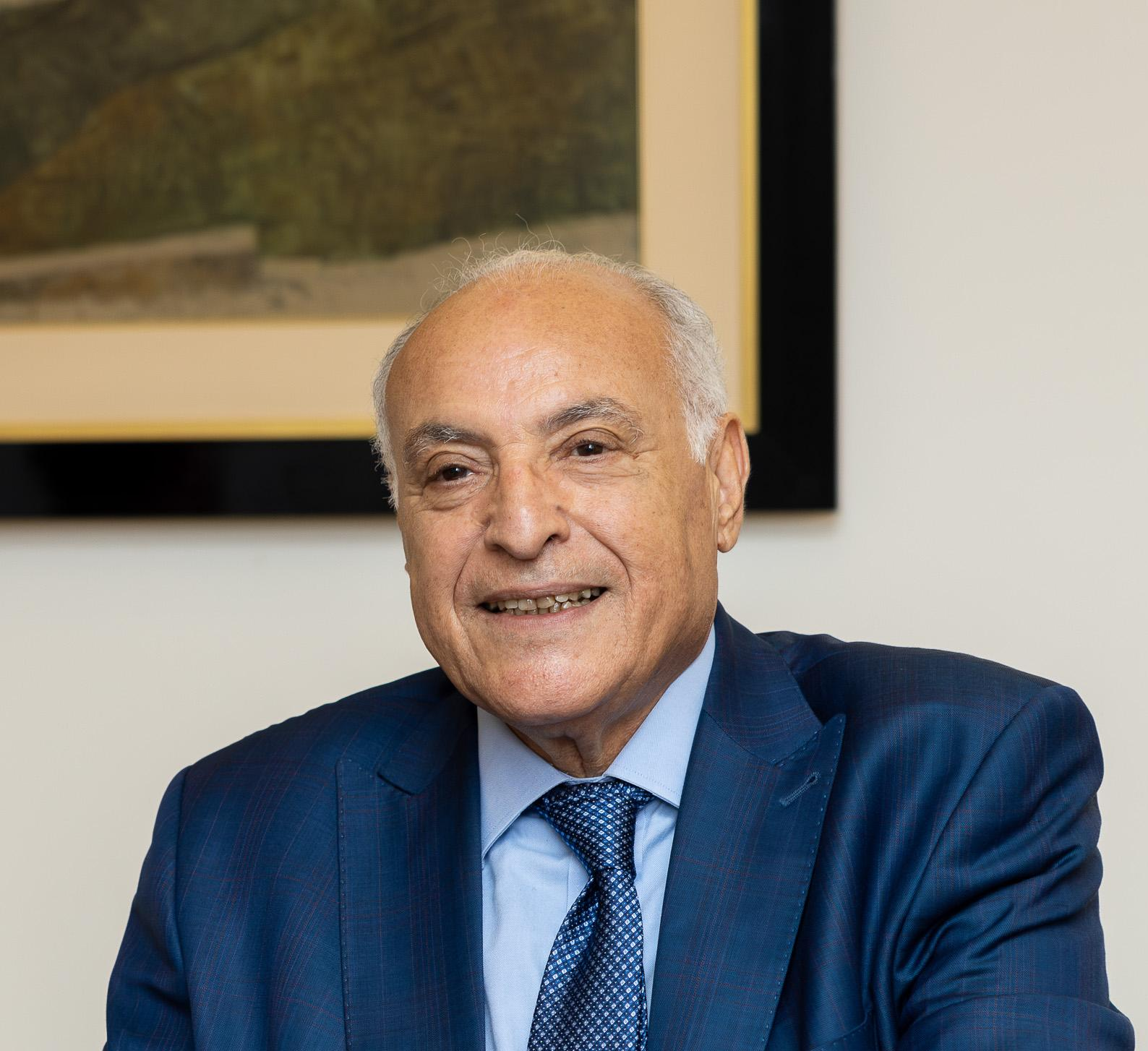
- Attaf in 2024

Minister of Foreign Affairs
- Incumbent
- Assumed office 18 March 2023
- President: Abdelmadjid Tebboune
- Prime Minister: Aymen Benabderrahmane; Nadir Larbaoui; Sifi Ghrieb
- Preceded by: Ramtane Lamamra
- In office 1996–1999
- President: Liamine Zéroual; Abdelaziz Bouteflika
- Prime Minister: Ahmed Ouyahia; Smail Hamdani
- Preceded by: Mohamed Salah Dembri
- Succeeded by: Youcef Yousfi

Personal details
- Born: 10 July 1953 (age 73) Ain Defla, Algeria
- Party: National Rally for Democracy.
- Education: National School of Administration
- Profession: Politician, Diplomat

Ahmed Attaf (Arabic: أحمد عطاف; born 10 July 1953) is an Algerian politician and diplomat. He is the current Minister of Foreign Affairs and the National Community Abroad since March 18, 2023, after having held the position from early 1996 to late 1999.

== Biography ==
=== Education ===
Ahmed Attaf is a graduate of the National School of Administration of Algeria (ENA) in the Frantz Fanon promotion of 1971–1975.

In 1980, he obtained a diploma in English language proficiency from Hunter College in New York.

In 1977, he earned a postgraduate diploma (D.E.S) in Political Science from the University of Algiers.

=== Diplomatic Career ===
After obtaining his ENA diploma at the age of 22, he was recruited by the Ministry of Foreign Affairs. He was then sent to Washington to head the economic section at the Algerian Embassy in the United States and later became the head of the Multilateral Treaties Division.

He subsequently held important positions, such as Chief of the Political Affairs Division of the Organization of African Unity (OAU) from 1977 to 1979, Secretary at the Permanent Mission of Algeria to the United Nations from 1979 to 1982, deputy director of Strategic Affairs and Disarmament at the United Nations in 1982, and Director of International Political Affairs at the Algerian Ministry of Foreign Affairs in 1984.

Throughout his career, Ahmed Attaf held several important diplomatic positions, including Algerian Ambassador to India, Yugoslavia, and the United Kingdom. He was also one of the close collaborators of the Minister of Foreign Affairs Ahmed Taleb Ibrahimi, alongside Ramtane Lamamra.

=== Political career ===
==== Secretary of State ====
In March 1994, Ahmed Attaf was appointed Secretary of State for Cooperation and Maghreb Affairs, and later also designated as the government spokesperson starting from October 1994.

Prior to his government appointment, Ahmed Attaf was known for his support for the closure of the borders between Algeria and Morocco, which he justified due to the smuggling of Algerian food products and drug trafficking. After his government appointment, he wrote a memorandum in 1994, informing President Zéroual of the need to close the borders with Morocco, which he obtained from the head of state.

In 1995, Ahmed Attaf described the Sant'Egidio Platform as a "non-event" in the context of the civil war of the 1990s in Algeria. This position was controversial and criticized by several political groups and human rights organizations.

==== Minister of Foreign Affairs ====
In January 1996, Ahmed Attaf became Minister of Foreign Affairs of Algeria, a position he held during the "black decade" until 1999.

==== RND Deputy ====
In 1997, he was one of the founding members of the National Democratic Rally (RND). He was elected as a deputy for the 1997-2002 legislature under the banner of this party, during the first pluralistic mandate of the National People's Assembly (APN) in Algeria. He was also the President of the RND parliamentary group in the National People's Assembly and again the leading candidate in the Algerian legislative elections of 2002 in Aïn Defla.

==== Secretary General of Avant-garde des libertés ====
In 2014, he was expelled from the RND by President Abdelkader Bensalah after joining the Avant-garde des libertés (AGL) party founded by Ali Benflis.

In 2015, he was appointed advisor to Benflis and President of the Political Bureau of the movement. In 2019, he actively participated in Ali Benflis' electoral campaign for the Algerian presidential election, which was contested by Abdelmadjid Tebboune. He left the party at the end of the same year, following Benflis' withdrawal from the political scene after his electoral defeat.

==== Return to the Ministry of Foreign Affairs ====
On 16 March 2023 Ahmed Attaf was appointed Minister of Foreign Affairs and National Community Abroad in the Benabderrahmane government during a ministerial reshuffle, succeeding Ramtane Lamamra.

This appointment marked Ahmed Attaf's return to foreign affairs after a long period of political withdrawal during which he dedicated himself to teaching at the School of Political Sciences and International Relations in Algiers from 2009 to 2013. He assumed his role as minister on March 18, 2023.

On 4 May 2023, Attaf was chosen by President Abdelmadjid Tebboune to represent him at the enthronement ceremony of King Charles III in England.

On 17 May 2023, he chaired the follow-up body for the implementation of decisions and commitments made during the 31st Arab Summit held in Algeria. The meeting took place in Jeddah, Saudi Arabia.

On 29 May 2023, he attended the tribute ceremony for the late Algerian boxer and diplomat Lahouari Godih in New York.

In June 2023, Attaf met with representatives of the United Nations in New York to strengthen support for Algeria's candidacy as a non-permanent member of the Security Council for the period 2024–2025.

On August 9, 2023, Attaf undertakes a working visit to the United States. He is welcomed by his counterpart Antony Blinken.

== Publication ==
L'intégrisme, une contre-culture en Algérie, Entretiens avec Bachir Boumaaza, Ahmed Attaf et Abdelkader Taffar. L'Harmattan. March 1998. ISBN 2-7384-6527-7.

== Gallery ==
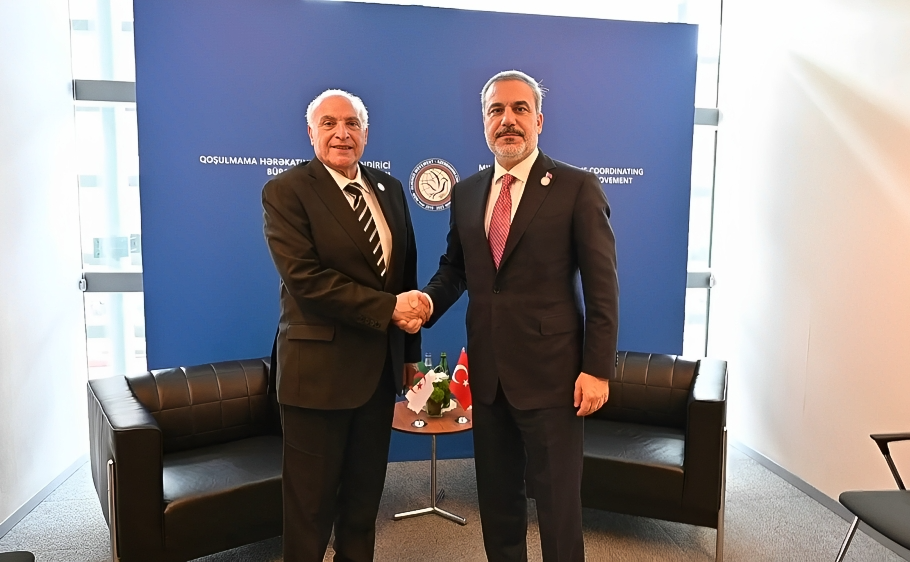
Ahmed Attaf with his Turkish counterpart Hakan Fidan.

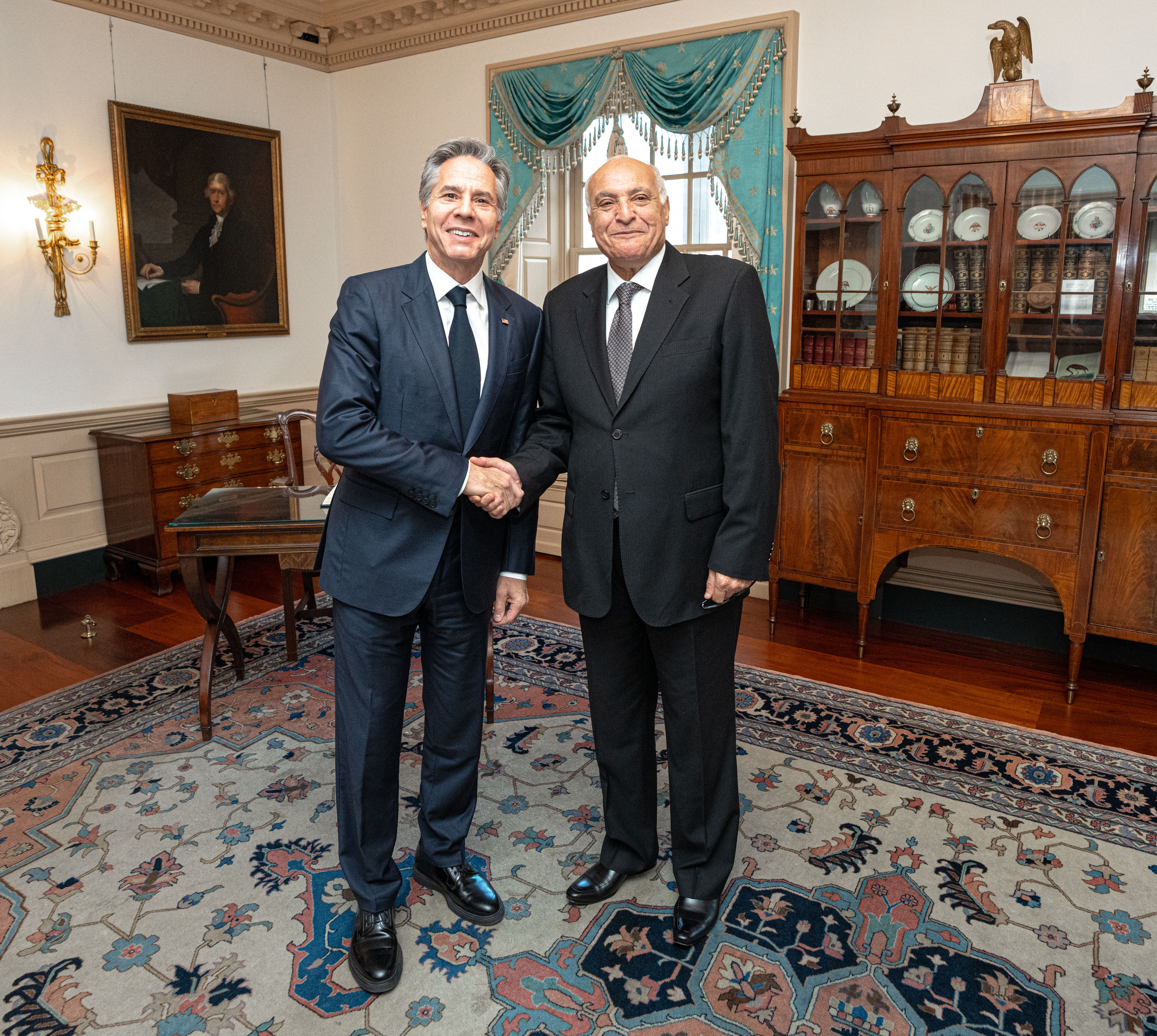
Ahmed Attaf with his American counterpart Antony Blinken.

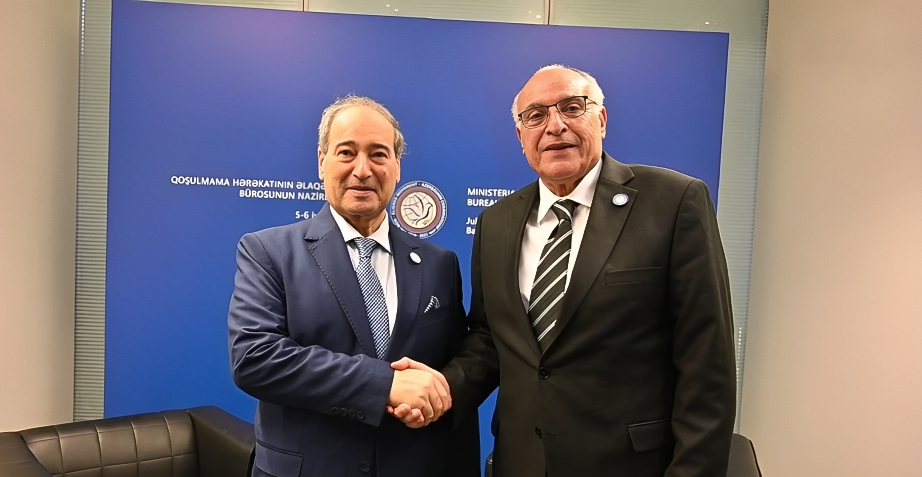
Ahmed Attaf with his Syrian counterpart Fayçal Al-Meqdad.

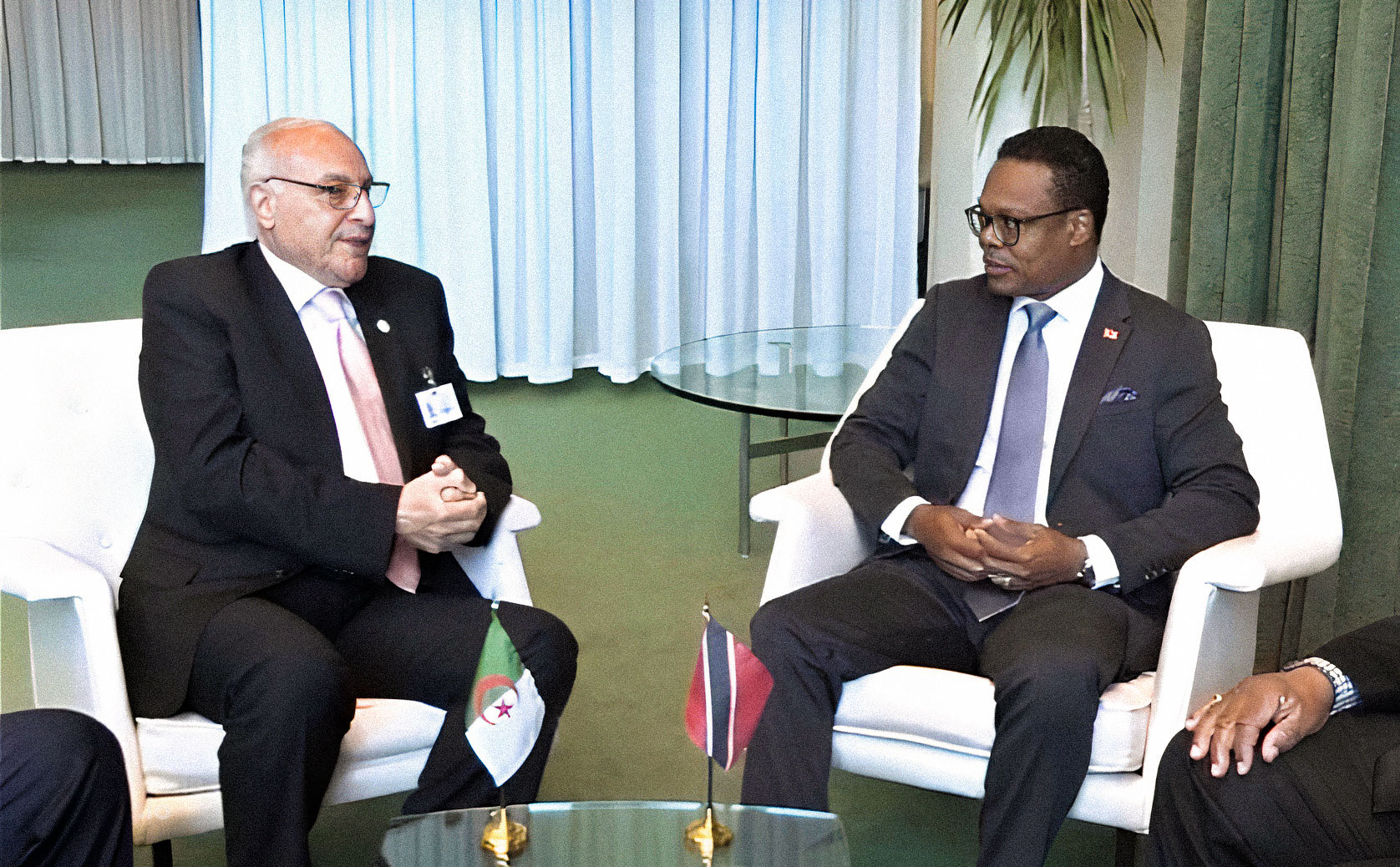
Ahmed Attaf with his counterpart from Trinidad and Tobago, Amery Browne.

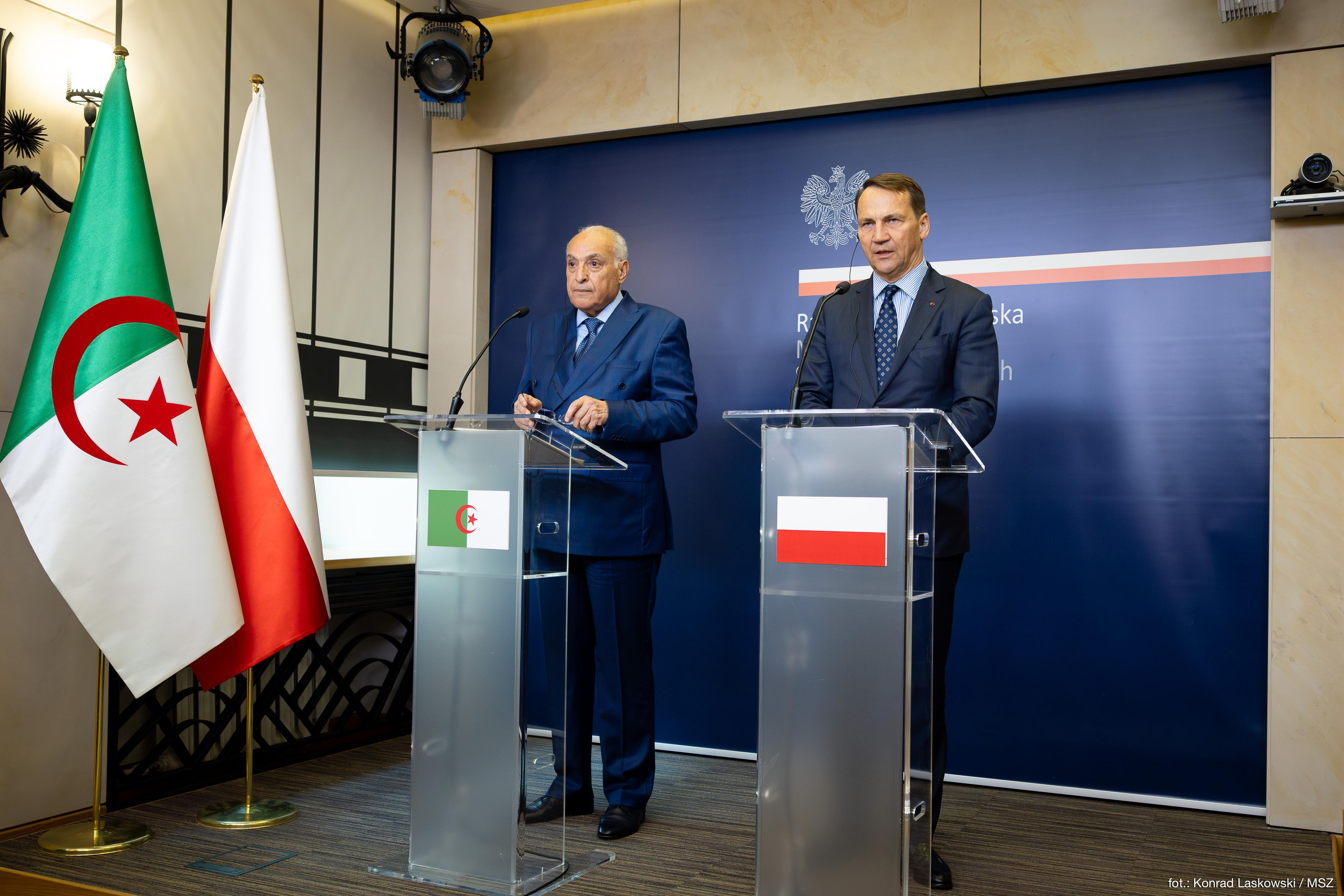
Ahmed Attaf and Polish minister of foreign affairs, Radosław Sikorski
