= National School of Administration (Algeria) =

Algerian Grande école

Coordinates: 36.7525°N 3.0239°E

- المدرسة الوطنية للإدارة (Arabic); École nationale d'administration (French)
- Type: Public
- Established: 1964
- Location: 13, Chemin Abdelkader Gadouche, Hydra, Algiers, Algeria
- Website: www.ena.dz

National School of Administration (ENA) (Arabic: المدرسة الوطنية للإدارة) (French: École nationale d'administration (ENA) is a public Grande école located in Hydra, Algiers, established in 1964.

This school was established pursuant to Executive Decree No. 64-155 dated June 8, 1964, It is currently under the supervision of the Ministry of the Interior and Local Communities.

== Notable graduates ==
- Abdelmadjid Tebboune (President of Algeria since December 19, 2019)
- Ahmed Ouyahia (Former Prime Minister of Algeria)
- Ramtane Lamamra
- Abdelmalek Sellal
- Abderezak Sebgag
- Azzedine Mihoubi (Minister of Culture and Arts of Algeria, May 14, 2015 - March 31, 2019)
- Nouria Yamina Zerhouni
- Noureddine Bedoui
- Leila Zerrougui
- Mostefa Benmansour

== See also ==
- List of universities in Algeria
