= Boualem Bessaïh =

Algerian politician and writer

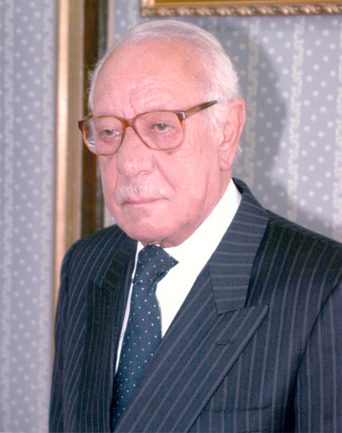
Boualem Bessaïh

Boualem Bessaïh (1930 – July 28, 2016) was an Algerian politician and writer. He was Minister of Foreign Affairs of Algeria from 1988 to 1989 and President of the Constitutional Council from 2005 to 2012. He was a professor of letters and human sciences at the University of Algiers.

== Career ==
Born in 1930 in El Bayadh, he joined the maquis in early 1957 and occupied important functions in the ranks of the armed revolution. He was among the founders of the Algerian secret services, led the section of espionage based in Tripoli, and was a member of the general secretariat of the National Council of the Algerian Revolution from 1959 to 1962.

After independence, he served as ambassador in several European and Arab capitals (Bern, the Vatican, Cairo, Kuwait City, Rabat). In 1971, he was appointed as Secretary-General of the Ministry of Foreign Affairs.

In 1979, he joined the government and held several ministerial positions. He was appointed successively as Minister of Information, Minister of Post and Telecommunications, Minister of Culture, and ultimately as Minister of Foreign Affairs from 1988 to 1989. As such, he participated actively in the tripartite Algeria - Morocco - Saudi Arabia, decided by the Arab Summit in Casablanca, the efforts made to arrive at the 1989 Taif Agreement to put an end to the Lebanese Civil War.

In 1997, he was appointed as a member of the Council of the Nation (the upper house of Parliament), and he was then elected as President of the Commission of Foreign Affairs of the Council. Subsequently he was Ambassador to Morocco. He was appointed by President Abdelaziz Bouteflika as President of the Constitutional Council in September 2005, serving in that post until March 2012.

Bessaïh was appointed as Minister of State and Special Adviser to President Bouteflika, as well as Personal Representative of the President, on 11 June 2016. He died less than two months later, on 28 July 2016, at the age of 86.
