= Ahmed Ouyahia =

Prime minister of Algeria (1995-1998; 2004-2006; 2008-2012; 2017-2019)

- أحمد أويحيى
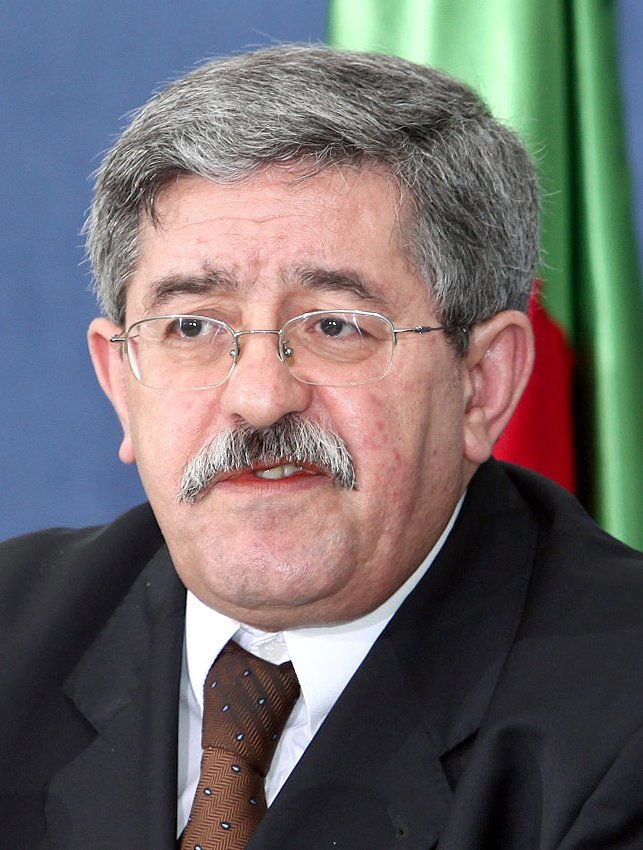
- Ouyahia in 2011

10th Prime Minister of Algeria
- In office 16 August 2017 – 12 March 2019
- President: Abdelaziz Bouteflika
- Preceded by: Abdelmadjid Tebboune
- Succeeded by: Noureddine Bedoui
- In office 23 June 2008 – 3 September 2012
- President: Abdelaziz Bouteflika
- Preceded by: Abdelaziz Belkhadem
- Succeeded by: Abdelmalek Sellal
- In office 11 August 2004 – 24 May 2006
- President: Abdelaziz Bouteflika
- Preceded by: Ali Benflis
- Succeeded by: Abdelaziz Belkhadem
- In office 31 December 1995 – 15 December 1998
- President: Liamine Zéroual
- Preceded by: Mokdad Sifi
- Succeeded by: Smail Hamdani

Secretary General of the Democratic National Rally
- In office 10 June 2015 – 25 June 2019; Acting: 10 June 2015 – 5 May 2016
- Preceded by: Abdelkader Bensalah
- Succeeded by: Azzedine Mihoubi (acting); Tayeb Zitouni
- In office 26 January 1999 – 3 January 2013
- Preceded by: Tahar Benaibèche
- Succeeded by: Abdelkader Bensalah

Personal details
- Born: 2 July 1952 (age 74) Iboudraren, Algeria
- Party: Democratic National Rally

Ahmed Ouyahia (Arabic: أحمد أويحيى, romanized: Aḥmad ʾŪyaḥyā; 2 July 1952) is an Algerian politician who was prime minister of Algeria four times (1995–98, 2004–2006, 2008–2012, 2017–2019). A career diplomat, he also served as Minister of Justice, and he was one of the founders of the Democratic National Rally (RND) as well as the party's secretary-general. He is considered by Western observers to be close to the military of Algeria and a member of the "eradicator" faction in the 1990s civil war against Islamist militants. Ouyahia resigned as prime minister in March 2019 following President Bouteflika's announcement that he would not seek reelection, and Ouyahia was arrested in June 2019 for crimes related to corruption. He was later convicted and is currently serving 19 years in jail.

== Early life and education ==
Ouyahia was born in the village of Bouadnane in Tizi Ouzou Province in the Kabylie region of Algeria on 2 July 1952. Following a primary education starting in Algiers, he followed a secondary education at the Lycee El Idrissi (El Idrissi High School) in Algiers. Ouyahia obtained his diploma of Baccalauréat ès-lettres in 1972.

In 1972, Ahmed Ouyahia joined the entry examination for the "National High Studies School of Administration" of Algiers. Having scored among the top three applicants, along with Ahmed Attaf, Ouyahia joined the National High Studies School of Administration and specialised in diplomacy. He graduated in 1976 and did his military service from 1976 to 1978, at the El Mouradia compound of the Algerian Presidency where he was a member of the press relations team.

== Early career ==
In 1979, Ouyahia joined the Ministry of Foreign Affairs and was assigned to the African affairs department. In 1980 he was named as an advisor for foreign affairs to the Ambassador of Algeria in Ivory Coast, where he served until 1982. In 1982 he was assigned as a foreign affairs advisor to the head of the Permanent Mission of Algeria at the United Nations headquarters in New York. In 1988 Ouyahia became the general director of the African department of the foreign affairs ministry. From 1988 to 1989 Ouyahia was co-representative to the United Nations Security Council. He was an advisor to the Minister of Foreign Affairs from 1990 to 1991.

He led the African department until 1991 when he was named as Ambassador to Mali; he served in the latter post from 1992 to 1993. There he helped negotiate a 1992 peace deal in the Malian Tuareg rebellion between the warring Malian government of Alpha Oumar Konaré and the Azawad Tuareg movement: the short lived "Pacte National" treaty. In August 1993, Ouyahia was called back to Algiers to serve in the government of Redha Malek as Undersecretary of State for African and Arab Affairs, Secretary of State for Cooperation and Maghreb Affairs.

In April 1994, he was nominated as the cabinet director of President Liamine Zeroual, in which post he was in charge of political affairs such as the negotiations with the leaders of the banned Islamic Salvation Front party (FIS) and the preparations for the 1995 presidential election, which the president won in November 1995. His role in as a member of the so-called "eradicator" faction, advocating all out war against the insurgency during the Algerian Civil War that killed more than 150,000 on both sides, earned him criticism from some Western human rights groups. He is particularly associated with the creation in the late 1990s of the GLD citizen militias ("Legitimate Defence Groups", Groupes de légitime défense).

== First and second premierships ==
In December 1995, Ouyahia was nominated as Prime Minister and held that position until December 1998, when he resigned following the election of Abdelaziz Bouteflika as president. The economic condition of Algeria in the late 1990s, as well as a wave of public sector strikes, contributed to his increasing unpopularity as Prime Minister and his December 1998 resignation. As well, opposition parliamentarians accused Ouyahia of rigging the 1997 elections.

In 2000, Ouyahia was elected as Secretary General of the National Rally for Democracy (RND), which he had earlier helped to found. He resigned from the post on 5 January 2013.

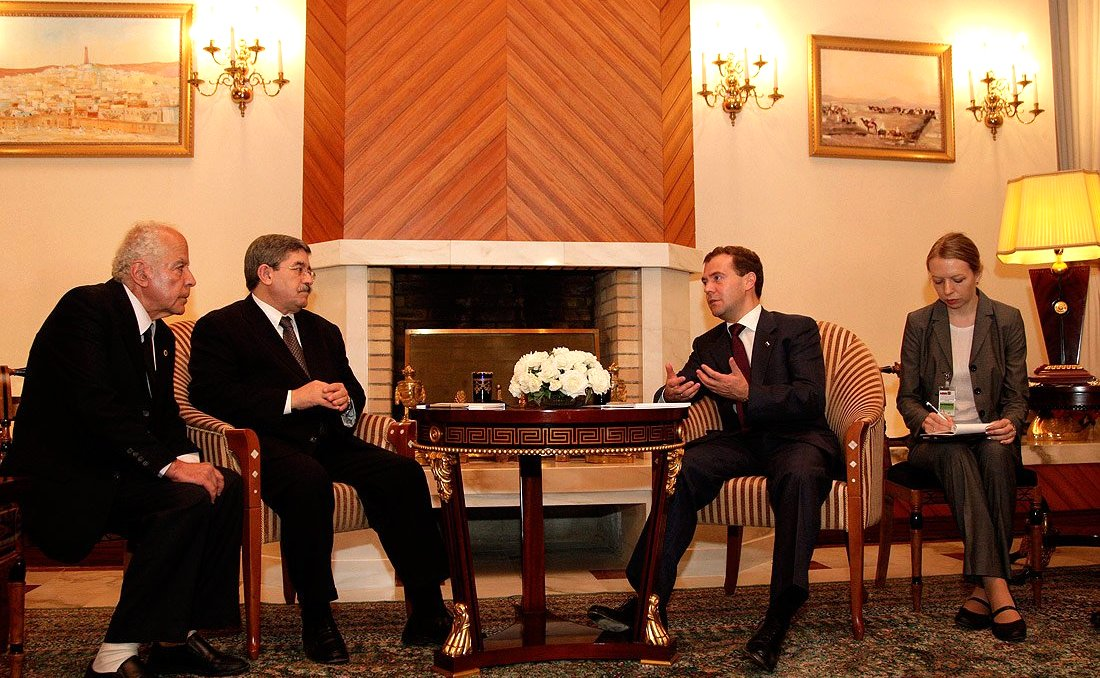
Ahmed Ouyahia and Russian President Dmitry Medvedev

Ouyahia served as the Minister of State for Justice from 1999 to 2002 in Bouteflika's first government. During this time Ouyahia was assigned the task of securing a peace deal in the war between Ethiopia and Eritrea by Bouteflika, who was also the president of Organisation for African Unity in 2000. Ouyahia worked in conjunction with Anthony Lake, National Security Advisor to President Bill Clinton of the United States, and a peace deal was secured and signed in Algiers in December 2000.

A strong defender of the government, in February 2001, Ouyahia proposed new laws as justice minister which would have imposed a three-year prison term for authors of articles or drawings deemed "defamatory" to political leaders.

In June 2002, following the defeat of the RND in the 2002 parliamentary election, Ouyahia resigned and was nominated in the next government as Minister of State and Special Representative of the President, an honorary position entailing no governing power. In August 2004, Ouyahia was nominated as prime minister for a second time, following a political crisis between President Bouteflika and Prime Minister Ali Benflis, who was dismissed. Ouyahia served in the post for three years, until his resignation on 24 May 2006 amidst political arguments between Ouyahia's political party and Bouteflika's political party, the FLN.

=== Economic troubles ===
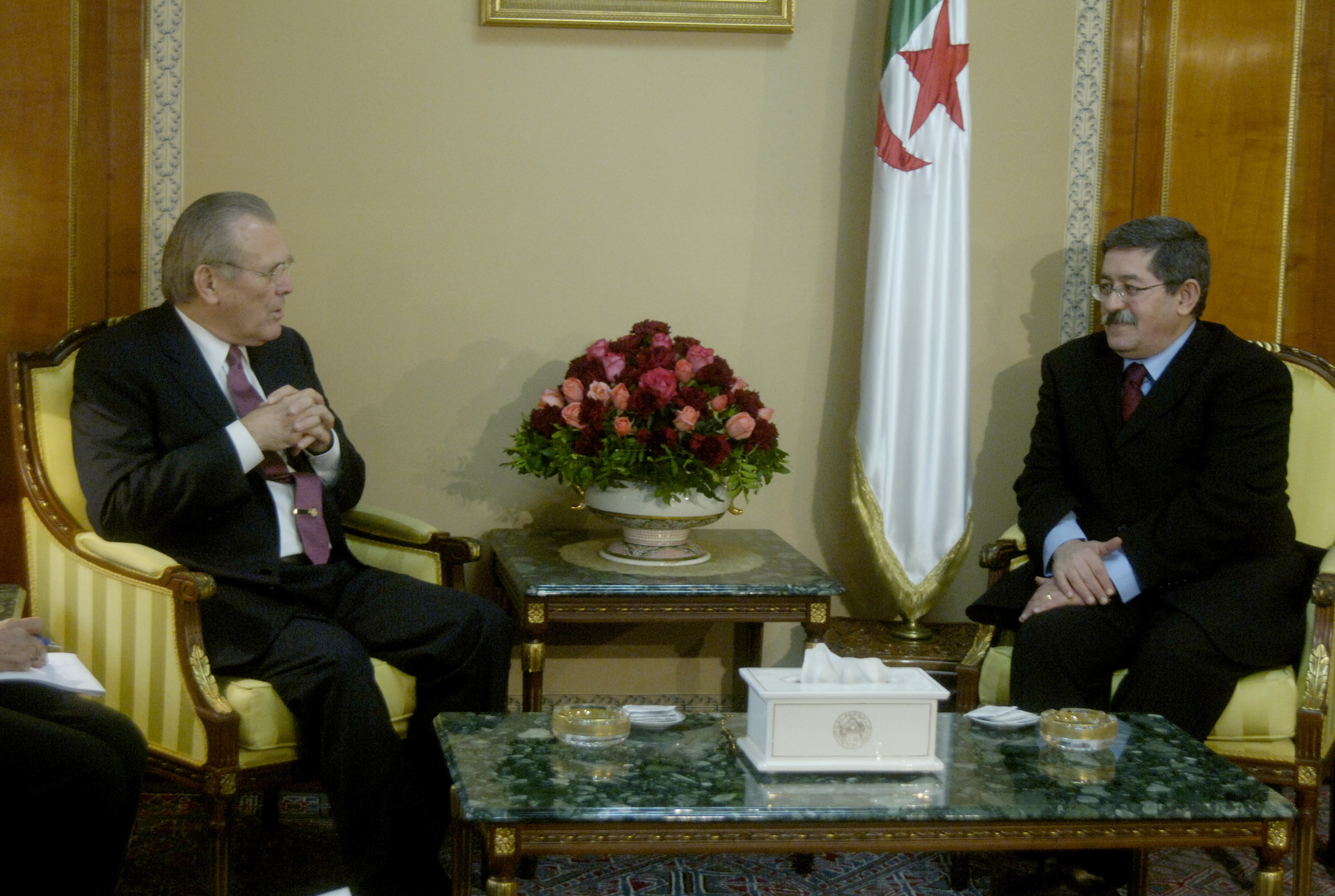
Ouyahia with Donald Rumsfeld on 12 Feb. 2006

Starting on 14 October 2004 and lasting through 10 November, the National Council of Secondary and Technical Education Professors (CNAPEST) and the Secondary School Council of Algiers (CLA) went on strike over low wages. education minister Boubekeur Benbouzid, backed by prime minister Ahmed Ouyahia, refused to meet with representatives of either union because they were not officially recognized. Instead, the Government ordered the suspension of more than 300 teachers and threatened further sanctions. only after the officially recognized UGTA affiliate National Federation of Education Workers (FNTE) joined the strike did the agree to raise wages.

The domestic press again asserted that his May 2006 resignation was due to public unpopularity after his opposition to public sector strikes, his opposition to a plan put forward by the rival FNL to raise salaries, and by his support for privatisation of industries.

=== Human rights ===
In June 2005, Ouyahia called Al-Jazeera television, recently closed indefinitely by his government, "a channel whose sole aim was to tarnish Algeria's image." The channel had broadcast several reports critical of the government the week prior to its closure. From 1993 to 2000, around 4,000 men and women suddenly disappeared in Algeria after being arrested by security forces. Ouyahia has been accused by Western Human rights groups of downplaying the number missing and criticised for claiming that "a large number of the so-called disappeared were in fact in the ranks of terrorist groups."

=== Kabylie mediator ===
Ouyahia has been widely credited with mediating a longstanding dispute between protesters leaders from his native Kabylie and the government. In 2005, the government took steps to defuse tensions with the Kabylie and address the concerns of regional leaders. In particular, prime minister Ahmed Ouyahia reached agreement on a number of Kabylie grievances with Arouch leader Belaid Abrika, who had been physically assaulted during a public protest rally and seriously injured in 2004 by members of government security services. The agreement dealt with economic and social concerns and made possible regional elections in November 2005. Ouyahia made a number of visits to opposition leaders, and reached out in the Berber-language media for reconciliation.

== Third and fourth premierships ==
After some prominent involvement in international diplomatic meetings earlier in 2008, Ouyahia was again named Prime Minister by Bouteflika on 23 June 2008. On this occasion, he pledged "to continue to apply the policy programme of the President of the Republic." The foreign and domestic press commented on the sometime stormy relations between Ouyahia and Bouteflika, which did not have the same way of his Prime Ministership. Ouyahia's term ended on 3 September 2012, and he was replaced by Abdulmalek Sellal.

Bouteflika appointed Ouyahia as Director of the Cabinet of the Presidency, with the rank of Minister of State, in March 2014. Ouyahia was again appointed as prime minister on 15 August 2017, succeeding Abdelmadjid Tebboune; he took office on 16 August.

In October 2018, Ouyahia announced that Algeria would ban the burqa at the workplace. In March 2019, Ouyahia resigned from his position as prime minister following President Bouteflika's announcement that he would not seek reelection following protests across the country. In June 2019, Ouyahia was arrested by the country's supreme court as part of an anti-corruption investigation. In December 2019, he was sentenced to 15 years in jail.

In March 2020, an appeals court upheld his sentence, to 12 years in prison. On 4 January 2021, Ouyahia was sentenced to seven years in prison, in relation to the corruption case in the tourism sector in Skikda.

Political offices
Preceded by Mokdad Sifi	Prime Minister of Algeria; 1995–1998	Succeeded by Smail Hamdani
Preceded by Ali Benflis	Prime Minister of Algeria; 2004–2006	Succeeded by Abdelaziz Belkhadem
Preceded by Abdelaziz Belkhadem	Prime Minister of Algeria; 2008–2012	Succeeded by Abdelmalek Sellal
Preceded by Abdelmadjid Tebboune	Prime Minister of Algeria; 2017–2019	Succeeded by Noureddine Bedoui
Party political offices
Preceded by Tahar Benaibèche	Leader of the National Rally for Democracy; 1999–2013	Succeeded by Abdelkader Bensalah
Preceded by Abdelkader Bensalah	Leader of the National Rally for Democracy; 2015–2019; Acting: 2015–2016	Succeeded by Azzedine Mihoubi; Acting
