= Mokdad Sifi =

Algerian politician

Mokdad Sifi (Arabic: مقداد سيفي; born 21 April 1940 in Tébessa) is an Algerian politician. Sifi was Head of Government of Algeria from 11 April 1994 to 31 December 1995. He was a Member of Parliament and once considered running for the Presidency. However, Sifi withdrew in April 1999 along with six of the seven other candidates, allowing the only remaining candidate, Abdelaziz Bouteflika, to become president. Sifi was said to have favored a market-oriented economy and no amnesty for the Islamic Salvation Front.

== Known Ministers ==
- Said Abadou (Minister for War Veterans)
- Sassi Aziz (Minister for Trade)
- Boubakour Benbouzid (Minister of Higher Education)
- Yahia Kaidum (Minister for Health and Population)
- Amar Sakhri (Minister of Education)

== Sources ==
- "The candidates who pulled out" BBC News, 15 April 1999

Political offices
Preceded by Redha Malek	Head of Government of Algeria; 1994–1995	Succeeded by Ahmed Ouyahia
