= Ministry of Foreign Affairs (Algeria) =

Government ministry of Algeria

Coordinates: 36°44′09″N 3°4′45″E

- Ministère des affaires étrangères وزارة الشؤون الخارجية
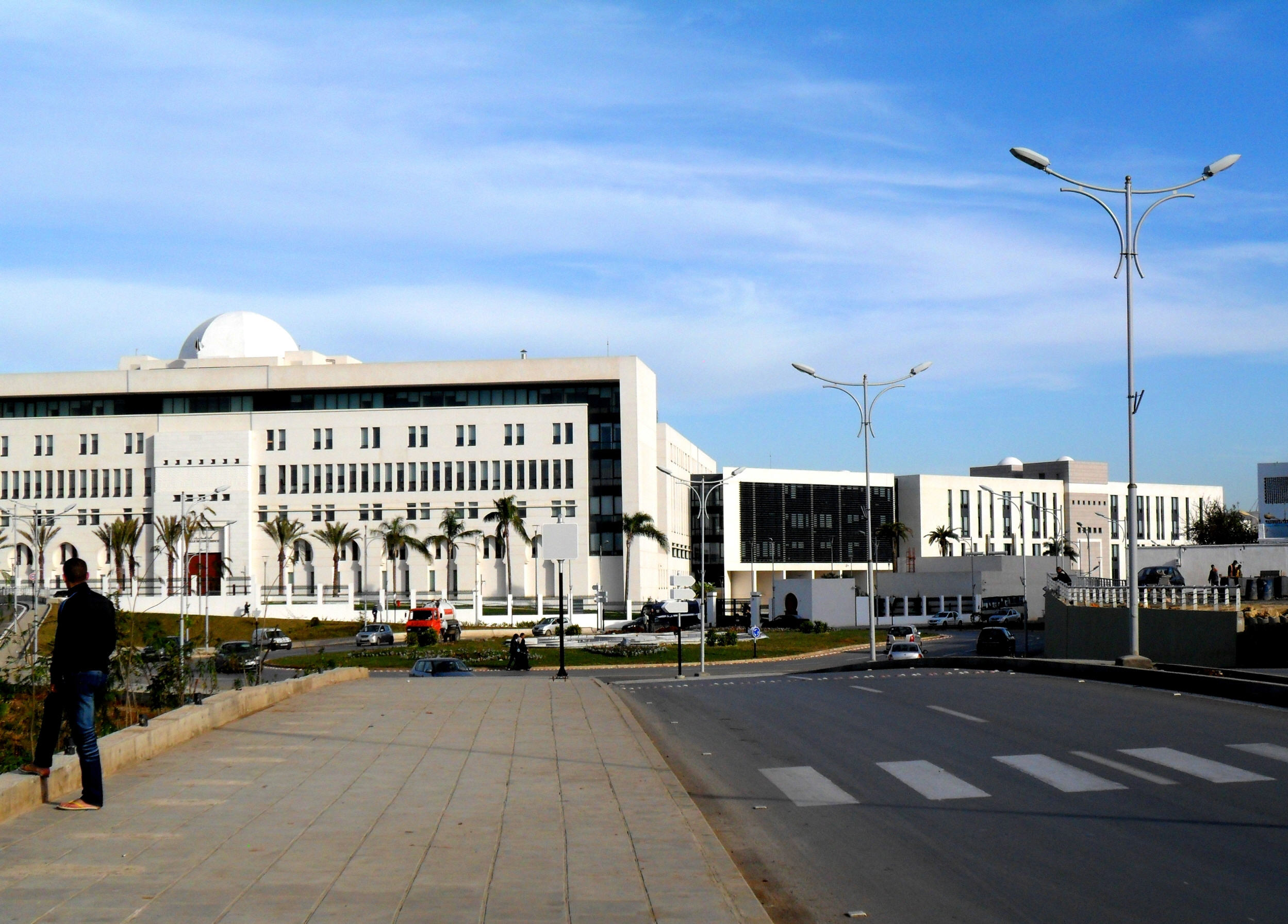

Agency overview
- Jurisdiction: Government of Algeria
- Headquarters: Kouba, Algiers
- Minister responsible: Ahmed Attaf
- Website: https://www.mfa.gov.dz/en/

The Ministry of Foreign Affairs (Arabic: وزارة الشؤون الخارجية, romanized: Wizārat al-Shuʼūn al-Khārijīyah) is the Algerian government ministry which oversees the foreign relations of Algeria. Its head office is in Kouba, Algiers Province.

Ahmed Attaf has served as Minister of Foreign Affairs since March 2023.

== See also ==
- Foreign relations of Algeria
