= 2025 in Algeria =

- Decades: 2000s; 2010s; 2020s
- See also: History of Algeria; List of years in Algeria

Events in the year 2025 in Algeria.

== Incumbents ==
- President: Abdelmadjid Tebboune
- Prime Minister: Nadir Larbaoui (until 28 August); Sifi Ghrieb onwards
- Government: Ghrieb government

== Events ==
=== January ===
- 17 January – A Spanish national is abducted in the south of the country by a "transnational mafia". He is subsequently located in neighboring Mali and released by the Azawad Liberation Front on 20 January.

=== February ===
- 11–12 February – A nationwide strike is held by teachers in protest over low salaries and poor working conditions.

=== March ===
- 9 March – Elections are held for 72 seats in the 144-member Council of the Nation.
- 19 March – A fighter jet of the Algerian Air Force crashes during a training mission near Aoulef in Adrar Province, killing the pilot.
- 27 March – A court in Dar El Beïda sentences writer Boualem Sansal, who holds dual French nationality, to five years' imprisonment and a fine of 500,000 Algerian dinars ($3,730) for comments deemed to be undermining Algeria's territorial integrity.
- 31 March – The Algerian Army says it had shot down a drone that had entered the country's airspace from Mali near Tin Zaouatine.

=== April ===
- 6 April –
  - Burkina Faso, Niger and Mali withdraw their ambassadors from Algeria as part of protests against accusations by Algiers over the drone shoot-down incident near the Malian border on 31 March.
  - Algeria suspends all flights to and from Mali, citing multiple airspace violations.
- 14 April – Algeria orders the expulsion of 12 French diplomats in retaliation for France indicting three Algerians for the 2024 abduction of dissident Amir Boukhors in Paris. In retaliation, France expels 12 Algerian diplomats the next day.

=== May ===
- 11 May – Algeria orders the expulsion of 15 French diplomats, citing breaches of diplomatic procedures related in part to the replacement of staff expelled in the previous round of removals in April.
- 26 May – Former presidential candidates Saïda Neghza, Belkacem Sahli and Abdelhakim Hamadi are convicted and sentenced to 10 years' imprisonment for corruption.

=== June ===
- 10 June – The European Union adds Algeria to its list of high risk jurisdictions for money laundering and terrorism financing.
- 22 June – Three fans die and more than 70 others are injured after a security barrier collapses during celebrations at the Stade du 5 Juillet in Algiers following MC Alger’s league title win against NC Magra.
- 28 June – French freelance sports journalist Christophe Gleizes is sentenced by a court in Algeria to seven years' imprisonment on charges that include terrorism and illegal entry to Algeria in connection with his reporting on JS Kabylie.

=== August ===
- 5 August – A civil protection surveillance aircraft crashes during a training mission at Jijel Ferhat Abbas Airport in Taher, killing four people.
- 15 August – A bus falls off a bridge into the Oued El Harrach river in El Harrach, killing 18 people and injuring 24 others.
- 28 August – President Tebboune dismisses Nadir Larbaoui as prime minister, replacing him with Sifi Ghrieb.

=== September ===
- 4 September – Mali files a case in the International Court of Justice against Algeria over the latter's shootdown of a Malian military drone in the Tinzaouaten area on 31 March.

=== November ===
- 12 November – President Tebboune issues a pardon to Boualem Sansal.

=== December ===
- 24 December – The People's National Assembly passes a law criminalizing the French occupation of Algeria.

== Holidays ==
- 1 January – New Year's Day
- 12 January – Amazigh New Year
- 22 February – Day of Fraternity and Cohesion in Algeria
- 31 March – Eid al-Fitr
- 1 May - Labour Day
- 7 June — Eid al-Adha
- 26 June – Awal Muharram
- July 5 – Independence Day
- 4 September – Milad un-Nabi
- 1 November – Revolution Day

== Deaths ==
- 7 January – Abdelkader Ould Makhloufi, 80, boxer.
- 24 January – Lakhdar Bouyahi, 79, footballer (NA Hussein Dey, national team).
- 4 February – Sid Ahmed Ghozali, 87, prime minister (1991–1992).
- 17 March – Hocine Zehouane, 89, politician.
- 22 March – Djamel Menad, 64, football player (Nîmes, national team) and manager (USM Annaba).
- 28 March – Hamza Feghouli, 86, actor (Le Clandestin).
- 2 April – Omar Aktouf, 80, Algerian-born Canadian consultant and academic.
- 14 May – Fadéla M'rabet, 90, writer.
- 23 May – Mohammed Lakhdar-Hamina, 91, film director (Chronicle of the Years of Fire, Sandstorm, The Last Image) and screenwriter.
- 5 June – Djoher Amhis-Ouksel, 96–97, writer.
- 1 July – Ahmed Zahzah, 91, footballer (USM Blida).
- 15 July – Madani Naamoun, 81, actor.
- 11 August – Sid Ali Lazazi, 67, footballer (NA Hussein Dey, national team).
- 13 August – Rachid Ferhani, 80, Kabyle singer.
- 14 August – Noureddine Ben Omar, 74, film and television director.
- 18 August – Issaâd Dhomar, 92, football player (JS El Biar, national team) and executive, president of the Algerian Football Federation (1984–1986).
- 24 August – Khaled Louma, 70, musician and radio presenter
- 27 August – Abdellah Liegeon, 67, footballer (Monaco, Strasbourg, national team).
- 5 October – Ahmed Taleb Ibrahimi, 93, politician, minister of education (1965–1970) and foreign affairs (1982–1988).
- 7 October – Djilali Selmi, 79, footballer (OMR, CRB, national team).
- 3 November – Tayeb Zitouni, 69, politician.
- 20 November – Miloud Khetib, 80, Algerian-born French actor.
- 25 November – Biyouna, 73, singer and actress (Bacon on the Side, Holiday, Belleville Cop).

== See also ==
- 2020s
- African Union
- Arab League
- al-Qaeda in the Islamic Maghreb
- Islamic State of Iraq and the Levant – Algeria Province
