= 2026 in Algeria =

- Decades: 2000s; 2010s; 2020s
- See also: History of Algeria; List of years in Algeria

Events in the year 2026 in Algeria.

== Incumbents ==
- President: Abdelmadjid Tebboune
- Prime Minister: Sifi Ghrieb

== Events ==
=== January ===
- 4 January – President Tebboune dismisses Bank of Algeria governor Salah Eddine Taleb by presidential decree, and appoints deputy governor Mouatassem Boudiaf as acting governor.

=== March ===
- 4 March – At least six people are killed and 15 others are injured when a passenger bus and a semi-trailer truck collide in Tamacine, Touggourt Province.
- 5 March – Two people are killed and four others are injured when a Beechcraft 1900 of the Algerian Air Force crashes at Boufarik Airport near Boufarik, Blida Province.
- 13 March – Seven militants are killed by the Algerian Army during two counter-terrorism operations in Tebessa Province; three soldiers are also killed in the clashes.

=== April ===
- 13 April –
  - Pope Leo XIV arrives in Algiers for a two-day visit, becoming the first pontiff to visit Algeria.
  - Two bombers die in a suicide attack near a police station in Blida.
- 20 April – Former industry minister Ali Aoun is sentenced to five years' imprisonment for corruption by a court in Algiers over the irregular sale of ferrous and non-ferrous metal waste.
- 23 April – A boat carrying migrants from Somalia capsizes off Bou Ismaïl, killing 17 passengers.

=== May ===
- 1 May – China lifts tariffs on imports from Algeria until 2028.

=== June ===
- 11 June–19 July – Algeria participates at the 2026 FIFA World Cup.

=== July ===
- 2 July – 2026 Algerian parliamentary election: The FLN wins a plurality of seats in the People's National Assembly.
- 11 July – Mali restores diplomatic relations with Algeria after a yearlong rift.
- 16 July – A fire at an orphanage in the Mohammadia district of Algiers kills 11 people and injures 19 others.
- 24 July – The United States imposes a 12.5% tariff on Algeria, citing the presence of alleged forced labour in the supply chain.
- 31 July – A bus plunges into a ravine near Boumerdès, killing 28 people. President Tebboune declares three days of national mourning for the victims.

=== August ===
- 4 August – Seventeen migrants are reported dead after attempting to cross from Algeria to Spain's Balearic Islands, with two survivors.
- 26 August – Multiple heatwave-caused wildfires kill 12 people and injure 54, across several provinces.

=== September ===
- 6 September – A 10-year-old boy is found dead in a well in Ghassoul, El Bayadh Province, bringing an end to a four-day rescue operation which drew national attention.
- 10 September – Algeria severs diplomatic relations with the United Arab Emirates, citing unspecified "provocative or hostile" acts.

=== October ===
- 25 October – Parliament authorizes a proposal to deploy military forces in Niger with the intention of protecting Sonatrach's oil assets.

=== Scheduled ===
- 2025–26 in Algerian football

== Holidays ==
- 1 January – New Year's Day
- 12 January – Amazigh New Year
- 22 February – Day of Fraternity and Cohesion in Algeria
- 20 March – Eid al-Fitr
- 1 May - Labour Day
- 27 May — Eid al-Adha
- 16 June – Awal Muharram
- July 5 – Independence Day
- 25 August – Milad un-Nabi
- 1 November – Revolution Day

== Deaths ==
- 20 February – Abdelwahab Bekli, 85, politician.
- 14 March – Noureddine Djoudi, 92, diplomat.
- 28 March – Liamine Zéroual, 84, president (1994–1999) and minister of defense (1993–1999).
- 5 October – Boualem Boualem, 73, member of the Council of the Nation (2007–2012), cabinet director of the presidency (since 2023).
- 24 October – Ali Haroun, 99, member of the High Council of State (1992–1994).
- 18 November –Djamel Ould Abbes, 92, politician, member of the Council of the Nation (2013–2019).

== See also ==
- 2020s
- African Union
- Arab League
- al-Qaeda in the Islamic Maghreb
- Islamic State of Iraq and the Levant – Algeria Province
