= Ministry of Vocational Training and Education (Algeria) =

- وزارة التكوين والتعليم المهنيين; Ministère de la Formation et de l'Enseignement professionnels

Agency overview
- Headquarters: Ben Aknoun, Algiers
- Minister responsible: Nacima Arhab, Minister
- Website: www.mfep.gov.dz

The Ministry of Vocational Training and Education (Arabic: وزارة التكوين والتعليم المهنيين, French: Ministère de la Formation et de l'Enseignement professionnels) is the Algerian government ministry overseeing the public network for vocational education and training, including vocational secondary schools, apprenticeships, and accreditation of private providers. Its current minister is Nacima Arhab, and it is headquartered in Ben Aknoun, Algiers.

== History ==
Responsibility for vocational training has moved between several portfolios. It was combined with labor from 1977 to 1982 and again from 1984 to 1988, and held by a standalone ministry from 1982 to 1984. It was placed under the education ministry from 1988 to 1989, handled by a minister delegate from 1989 to 1991, combined with employment from 1991 to 1992, and held by a separate ministry from 1992 to 1996. From 1996 to 1999 it was a secretariat of state under the labor ministry, and it took its current name in 2002.

In early 2008, Law 08-07 set the framework for vocational education and training. In 2011, vocational education was transferred to the ministry from the Ministry of National Education. On 10 June 2018, Law 18-10 updated and consolidated the rules on apprenticeships.

Yacine Oualid held a national consultative forum in December 2024 shortly after his appointment to head the ministry, which resulted in eight priorities, including aligning curricula with market needs, improving employability and increasing placements and apprenticeships, moving toward digital transformation and less paperwork, and drawing in the private sector via a flexible legal framework.

In July 2025, the ministry announced that enrollment in its programs would move entirely online, through takwin.dz, and that the competency-based approach would be extended across its entire system. The ministry also emphasized its focus on training in strategic sectors such as agriculture, digital economy, energy, and industry.

Oualid was replaced by Nacima Arhab in September 2025 after Sifi Ghrieb took office as prime minister.

== Organization ==
In 2014, the ministry consisted of nine main directorates, covering strategy, planning, and implementation. It also had a directorate in each province, through which the central government coordinated training locally.

Multiple bodies operate under the ministry, including INFEP, the national institute for vocational education and training, responsible for the design of curricula, training trainers, and quality assurance. The ENEFEP is another body under the ministry's umbrella, supplying equipment to more than 1,300 institutions as of 2025. The CNEPD is the national center for vocational distance learning, and the FNAC is a fund that promotes apprenticeship and continuing training with employers.

There are also six regional trainer-training institutes operating under the ministry.

== Training network ==
Algeria had over 1,400 vocational training centers in 2025. Private providers are accredited by the ministry and in 2025 accounted for under 15% of enrolled trainees.

As of 2025, initial training covered 165 specialties. The October 2025 intake enrolled 672,000 trainees. For the February 2026 intake, about 285,000 new places were opened, of which over 57,000 were apprenticeship placements in companies. During the 2024–2025 academic year, over 183,000 full-time trainees were supported by stipends, while about 402,000 apprentices were paid pre-salaries.

== Reforms and programs ==
Arhab launched the National Training and Competency Framework (Référentiel national de formation et de compétences, RNFC) on 16 March 2026 in Algiers, replacing the old nomenclature of more than 400 specialties grouped into 23 branches. The RNFC organizes training into units of competence that can be assessed and recognized separately.

Earlier, on 17 June 2025, Oualid had announced 40 new digital specialties, to be rolled out across institutes and centers of excellence.

Centers of excellence were given legal status and accreditation criteria by Executive Decree 25-045 in February 2025. Centers identified include ones in Sétif for digital technologies and Ouargla for the petroleum industry.

The ministry launched three digital platforms: Mihnati for access, Maharati for teaching, and Tassyir for administration. Enrollment runs through takwin.dz, and tamhin.dz matches apprentices with companies.

== International cooperation ==
On 7 April 2026, at a ceremony held at INFEP in El Biar, Arhab announced Algeria's accession to WorldSkills, making the country its 90th member. Prior to this, the country had joined WorldSkills Africa in October 2025.

== Ministers ==
Minister	Title	Took office	Left office	Government	Ref
Mohamed Amir	Minister of Labor and Vocational Training	23 April 1977	8 March 1979	Boumédiène IV	
Mouloud Oumeziane	Minister of Labor and Vocational Training	8 March 1979	12 January 1982	Abdelghani I–II	
Mohamed Nabi	Minister of Vocational Training	12 January 1982	22 January 1984	Abdelghani III	
Mohamed Nabi	Minister of Vocational Training and Labor	22 January 1984	18 February 1986	Brahimi I	
Aboubakr Belkaïd	Minister of Vocational Training and Labor	18 February 1986	9 November 1988	Brahimi II	
Slimane Cheikh	Minister of Education and Training	9 November 1988	9 September 1989	Merbah	
Abdenour Keramane	Minister Delegate for Vocational Training	9 September 1989	18 June 1991	Hamrouche	
Mohamed Boumahrat	Minister of Vocational Training and Employment	18 June 1991	16 October 1991	Ghozali I	
Anissa Benameur	Minister of Employment and Vocational Training	16 October 1991	22 February 1992	Ghozali I	
Saïd Guechi	Minister of Employment and Vocational Training	22 February 1992	19 July 1992	Ghozali II	
Djelloul Baghli	Minister of Vocational Training	19 July 1992	21 August 1993	Abdessalam	
Hacène Laskri	Minister of Vocational Training	21 August 1993	5 January 1996	Malek, Sifi I–II	
Tahar Kaci	Secretary of State for Vocational Training, under the Minister of Labor	5 January 1996	24 June 1997	Ouyahia I	
Karim Younes	Secretary of State for Vocational Training, under the Minister of Labor	24 June 1997	24 December 1999	Ouyahia II, Hamdani	
Karim Younes	Minister of Vocational Training	24 December 1999	17 June 2002	Benbitour, Benflis I–II	
Abdelhamid Abad	Minister of Vocational Training and Education	17 June 2002	4 October 2003	Benflis III, Ouyahia III	
El Hadi Khaldi	Minister of Vocational Training and Education	4 October 2003	4 September 2012	Ouyahia III–IX, Belkhadem I–II	
Mohamed Mebarki	Minister of Vocational Training and Education	4 September 2012	11 September 2013	Sellal I	
Noureddine Bedoui	Minister of Vocational Training and Education	11 September 2013	14 May 2015	Sellal II–III	
Mohamed Mebarki	Minister of Vocational Training and Education	14 May 2015	31 March 2019	Sellal IV, Tebboune, Ouyahia	
Belkheir Dada Moussa	Minister of Vocational Training and Education	31 March 2019	2 January 2020	Bedoui	
Hoyem Benfreha	Minister of Vocational Training and Education	2 January 2020	7 July 2021	Djerad I–III	
Yassine Merabi	Minister of Vocational Training and Education	7 July 2021	18 November 2024	Benabderrahmane, Larbaoui	
Yacine Oualid	Minister of Vocational Training and Education	18 November 2024	14 September 2025	Larbaoui II	
Nacima Arhab	Minister of Vocational Training and Education	14 September 2025	Incumbent	Ghrieb	

== See also ==
- Education in Algeria
- Ministry of Higher Education and Scientific Research (Algeria)
