= Ministry of Youth (Algeria) =

Algerian government ministry

- وزارة الشباب; Ministère de la Jeunesse

Agency overview
- Formed: 18 November 2024
- Preceding agency: Ministry of Youth and Sports
- Minister responsible: Mustapha Hidaoui, Minister
- Website: mjeunesse.gov.dz

The Ministry of Youth is the Algerian government ministry responsible for youth affairs. It was created on 18 November 2024, when the Youth and Sports portfolio was split. Its minister is also in charge of the Supreme Youth Council (Algeria). The current minister is Mustapha Hidaoui.

== History ==
Previously, youth was combined with sports, as Ministry of Youth and Sports (Algeria), until 18 November 2024, when Decree 24-374 appointed Hidaoui minister of youth, in charge of the Supreme Youth Council, and named Walid Sadi minister of sports.

Hidaoui was reappointed in September 2025 when Sifi Ghrieb became prime minister.

== Mandate ==
On 11 February 2025, Decree 25-74 was issued, outlining the minister's attributions. It repealed Decree 16-84 from 2016, which had outlined the attributions of the previous joint ministry.

Its responsibilities include youth empowerment and capacities, leisure, and mobility; control and evaluation of the youth portfolio including state aid to youth associations; international cooperation; diaspora youth; and major youth events.

== Organization ==
Decree 25–75, issued on 11 February 2025, set up an inspectorate general and eight directorates, covering planning and research; skills development, youth initiatives, and integration; events, mobility, and leisure; and digitization and documentation, among others.

On 12 June 2025, Decree 25-164 was issued, covering the inspectorate general.

== Programs ==
In January 2026, the ministry announced a year-long young leaders training program for 1,000 youth aged 18 to 28, who will go on to train 30 other youth each, for a total of about 30,000 indirect beneficiaries.

The ministry also launched the 2025–2026 activity season at a pilot youth house in Aïn Taya in November 2025, with plans to extend the model to 1,002 establishments.

== Ministers ==
Minister	Title	Took office	Left office	Government	Ref
Mustapha Hidaoui	Minister of Youth	18 November 2024	Incumbent	Larbaoui II, Ghrieb	

== See also ==
- Cabinet of Algeria
- Politics of Algeria
