= 2023 in Algeria =

- Decades: 2000s; 2010s; 2020s
- See also: History of Algeria; List of years in Algeria

Events in the year 2023 in Algeria.

== Incumbents ==
- President: Abdelmadjid Tebboune
- Prime Minister: Aymen Benabderrahmane (until 11 November); Nadir Larbaoui onwards

== Events ==
Ongoing – COVID-19 pandemic in Algeria

- 23 January – During a military exercise, an Algerian Air Force Mi-171 helicopter crashes in Algeria, killing 3 crew on board.
- 3 February – Democracy activist Amira Bouraoui flees Algeria via Tunisia and then to France despite a travel ban. Her escape would later cause a diplomatic incident between Algeria, Tunisia and France.
- 19 July – At least 34 people are killed and 12 more injured during a road accident in Tamanrasset.
- 1 September – Two Moroccan-French tourists on a Jetski are shot dead and another is injured by the Algerian National Navy Near Saïdia after illegally crossing the border into Algerian waters.
- December 22: Mali recalls its ambassador in Algeria after accusing it of interference in its internal affairs by meeting rebel leaders, deepening diplomatic tensions over efforts to end the separatist and Islamist insurgencies in northern Mali.

=== Sports ===
- 25 November 2022 – May 2023: 2022–23 Algerian Cup
- 13 January – 4 February: 2022 African Nations Championship

== Deaths ==
- 13 May – Tayeb Belaiz (born 1948), jurist and politician

== See also ==
- 2020s
- African Union
- al-Qaeda in the Islamic Maghreb
- Arab League
- COVID-19 pandemic in Africa
- Islamic State – Algeria Province
