= 2027 in Algeria =

- Decades: 2000s; 2010s; 2020s
- See also: History of Algeria; List of years in Algeria

Events in the year 2027 in Algeria.

== Events ==
=== Predicted and scheduled events ===
- 2 August – Solar eclipse of August 2, 2027 (total eclipse)

== Holidays ==
- 1 January – New Year's Day
- 12 January – Amazigh New Year
- 22 February – Day of Fraternity and Cohesion in Algeria
- 9 March – Eid al-Fitr
- 1 May - Labour Day
- 16 May — Eid al-Adha
- 6 June – Awal Muharram
- 5 July – Independence Day
- 15 August – Milad un-Nabi
- 1 November – Revolution Day

== See also ==
- 2020s
- African Union
- Arab League
- al-Qaeda in the Islamic Maghreb
- Islamic State of Iraq and the Levant – Algeria Province
