= Ghrieb government =

Incumbent government of Algeria since 2025

- 51th Cabinet of Algeria
- Incumbent
- Date formed: 15 September 2025

People and organisations
- President: Abdelmadjid Tebboune
- First Minister: Sifi Ghrieb
- Total no. of members: 38
- Member parties: FLN; Independents; RND
- Status in legislature: Coalition
- Opposition parties: MSP

History
- Election: 12 June 2021
- Legislature term: 11th Assembly
- Predecessor: Larbaoui government

The Ghrieb government is the executive branch of Algeria, headed since 15 September 2025 by Prime Minister Sifi Ghrieb.

== Composition ==
=== Prime Minister ===
Image	Function	Name	Party
	Prime Minister	Sifi Ghrieb	Independent

=== Ministers ===
Image	Function	Name	Party
	Minister of National Defence	Abdelmadjid Tebboune	FLN
	Minister of the Interior, Local Authorities and Transport	Saïd Sayoud	
	Minister of Justice, Keeper of the Seals	Lotfi Boudjemaa	
	Minister of Finance	Abdelkrim Bouzred	
	Minister of Mujahideen and Beneficiaries	Abdelmalek Tachrift	
	Minister of Religious Affairs and Endowments	Youcef Belmehdi	
	Minister of National Education	Mohamed Seghir Saâdaoui	
	Minister of Higher Education and Scientific Research	Kamel Bidari	
	Minister of Vocational Training and Education	Nassima Arhab	
	Minister of Culture and Arts	Malika Bendouda	
	Minister of Youth; In charge of the Supreme Youth Council	Moustafa Hidaoui	
	Minister of Sports	Walid Sadi	
	Minister of Post and Telecommunications	Sid Ali Zerrouki	
	Minister of National Solidarity, Family and the Status of Women	Soraya Mouloudji	
	Minister of Industry	Yahia Bachir	
	Minister of Agriculture, Rural Development and Fisheries	Yacine Oualid	
	Minister of Energy and Renewable Energies	Mourad Adjal	
	Minister of Housing, Urban Planning and the City	Mohamed Tarek Belaribi	
	Minister of Domestic Trade and National Market Regulation	Amel Abdellatif	
	Minister of Trade and Export Promotion	Kamel Rezig	
	Minister of Communication	Zoheir Bouamama	
	Minister of Public Works and Infrastructure	Abdelkader Djellaoui	
	Minister of Water Resources	Taha Derbal	
	Minister of Tourism	Houria Meddahi	
	Minister of Health	Mohamed Seddik Aït Messaoudène	
	Minister of Labour, Employment and Social Security	Abdelhak Saihi	
	Minister and Governor of the Province of Algiers	Mohamed Abdenour Rabehi	
	Minister for Relations with Parliament	Nadjiba Djilali	
	Minister of the Environment and Quality of Life	Kaoutar Krikou	
	Minister of the Knowledge Economy, Start-ups and Micro-enterprises	Noureddine Ouaddah	
	Minister of the Pharmaceutical Industry	Ouassim Kouidri	
	High Commissioner for Digitalization and Statistics	Meriem Benmouloud	

=== Minister delegates ===
Image	Function	Name	Party
	Minister Delegate to the Minister of National Defence	Saïd Chengriha	

=== Secretaries of State ===
Image	Function	Name	Party
	Secretary of State for African Relations	Salma Mansouri	
	Secretary of State for Community	Sofiane Chaïb	
	Secretary of State for Mines	Karima Bekkir	

== See also ==
- Cabinet of Algeria
