= Feghouli =

Feghouli is a surname. Notable people with the surname include:

- Hamza Feghouli (1938–2025), Algerian actor
- Sofiane Feghouli (born 1989), Algerian footballer
