= Amira Bouraoui =

French-Algerian political activist

Amira Bouraoui (Arabic : أميرة بوراوي born c. 1976) is a French-Algerian political activist. A former gynecologist, in 2014 she came to prominence for her involvement in the protests against the fourth term of President Abdelaziz Bouteflika, and later in the Hirak movement. In 2023, she was sentenced to 10 years in prison in absentia by an Algerian court for leaving the country while she was under an exit ban.

== Biography ==
Amira Bouraoui grew up as the daughter of Mohamed Saleh Bouraoui, an Algerian cardiologist and former military officer who was the director of a military hospital in Algiers. Amira Bouraoui later trained as a gynecologist and became involved in political activism as a pro-democracy activist. She additionally holds French citizenship.

=== Political activism ===
Bouraoui was first arrested for her political advocacy in 2011. By 2014 she had been arrested by Algerian authorities five times. Bouraoui was called to activism because of an impulse to fight injustice. When asked why she took part in protesting, she said "I think human beings are not born simply to eat and sleep. We are born to dream of freedom, to realize our dreams, to defend our ideas, to think".

In 2014, Dr. Bouraoui was recognized as one of the initiators of the Barakat movement against the fourth term of President Abdelaziz Bouteflika. After 15 years in power, and an Algerian law that had limited presidents to two terms, the Barakat protests aimed to challenge Bouteflika's continued rule.

She described the Barakat movement,

"We are a citizen movement, made up of Algerian citizens who were not all political activists. We work for democracy and the acquisition of citizenship. When you have not chosen your president, you are no more than a pilot project of a citizen. You are not an actual citizen. I would say Barakat is supra-political, because to permit political parties to take part in democracy, you must have rules of the game that are clear, transparent and respected. This citizen movement aspires to create these rules. We do not want to be a political party, and we do not want to be political in the partisan sense."

During the Barakat protests, Bouraoui was arrested and detained for her activism. She claimed during her first arrest she was subject to harsh treatment, which she had to take time out of her work as a doctor to recover from.

=== Hirak ===
In 2019, she became known for her role in the protests that would become known as the Hirak movement, which led to the resignation of President Bouteflika. Bouraoui later became the host of a talk show on Radio M, an independent radio station in Algeria.

In 2020, she was detained by Algerian authorities and released from Kolea prison in July 2020.

In 2021, Bouraoui was sentenced to two years in jail for "insulting the president" and "offending Islam" for her actions with the Hirak movement. At the time, more than 70 people involved in the Hirak protests were being held in Algerian prisons for their relationship to the protest movement or other cases related to freedom of expression. She remained on remand while an appeal was pending, but banned from leaving the country. In 2022, Radio M was banned in Algeria.

=== Escape from Algeria ===
On February 3, 2023, Bouraoui left her home in Annaba, Algeria by taxi and travelled to Tunisia where she attempted to catch a flight to Paris. Bouraoui used her mother Khadidja's passport to enter the country. Upon her arrival at the airport, she was detained by Tunisian authorities and threatened with deportation. Due to being a French-Algerian dual national, she was allowed to proceed to Lyon three days later after being received by authorities at the French embassy in Tunis as well as by representatives from Human Rights Watch and Amnesty International.

Bouraoui's flight to France caused a diplomatic incident between France and Algeria, as well as one within Tunisia. The Algerian Ministry of Foreign Affairs expressed the following communique,

The Ministry of Foreign Affairs and the National Community abroad expressed today to the Embassy of France the firm condemnation by Algeria of the violation of national sovereignty by diplomatic, consular and security personnel under the French State who participated in a clandestine and illegal operation of exfiltration of an Algerian national whose physical presence on the national territory is prescribed by the Algerian justice. In this official note, Algeria rejects this inadmissible and unacceptable development which causes great damage to Algerian-French relations.

In response, Algeria's ambassador to France, Said Moussi was recalled from his post, and Tunisian president Kais Saied dismissed the country's foreign minister. After Bouraoui's escape, he mother, sister and cousin were detained by Algerian authorities.

=== Trial and conviction ===
Tunisia later tried Bouraoui in absentia and charged her with illegally entering the country and sentenced her to three months in prison. In November 2023, Bouraoui was sentenced in absentia by authorities in Algeria for "illegally leaving the territory" when she crossed into Tunisia and defied an exit ban. At the time of her sentencing, her mother received a one year suspended sentence for providing her passport, her cousin Yacine Bentayeb, and the taxi driver who drove her across the border, Djamel Miassi, both received six months in prison for supporting her.

== See also ==
- Ihsane El Kadi, founder of Radio M and former prisoner of conscience
- 2021 Algerian protests
