= Mohamed Meziane (politician) =

Algerian politician

Minister of Communication
- In office 19 November 2024 – 14 September 2025
- President: Abdelmadjid Tebboune
- Prime Minister: Nadir Larbaoui; Sifi Ghrieb (acting)
- Preceded by: Mohamed Laagab
- Succeeded by: Zoheir Bouamama

Personal details
- Born: November 20, 1960 (age 65) Algiers, Algeria
- Education: Algiers 1 University (Dr)

Mohamed Meziane (born November 20, 1960) is the Algerian Minister of Communication. He was appointed as minister on 19 November 2024.

== Education ==
Meziane holds a master's degree in Journalism (1995) and a Doctorate in Information and Communications Sciences (2001) from the University of Algiers.

== Career ==
From 2006 to 2008, he worked as Deputy Director of Media Relations at the Ministry of Foreign Affairs.

Between 2008 and 2013, Meziane was Minister-Counselor and Charge d’Affaires at the embassy of Algeria in New Delhi and in Tokyo.

From 2019 until 2023, he served as ambassador of Algeria to Mozambique, Malawi, and Eswatini. Since 1 August 2023, Meziane has been the Director General of Communication, Information, and Documentation at the Ministry of Foreign Affairs and the National Community Abroad and he was appointed as Minister of Communication on 19 November 2024.
