= Athmane Ariouet =

Algerian actor

- عثمان عريوات
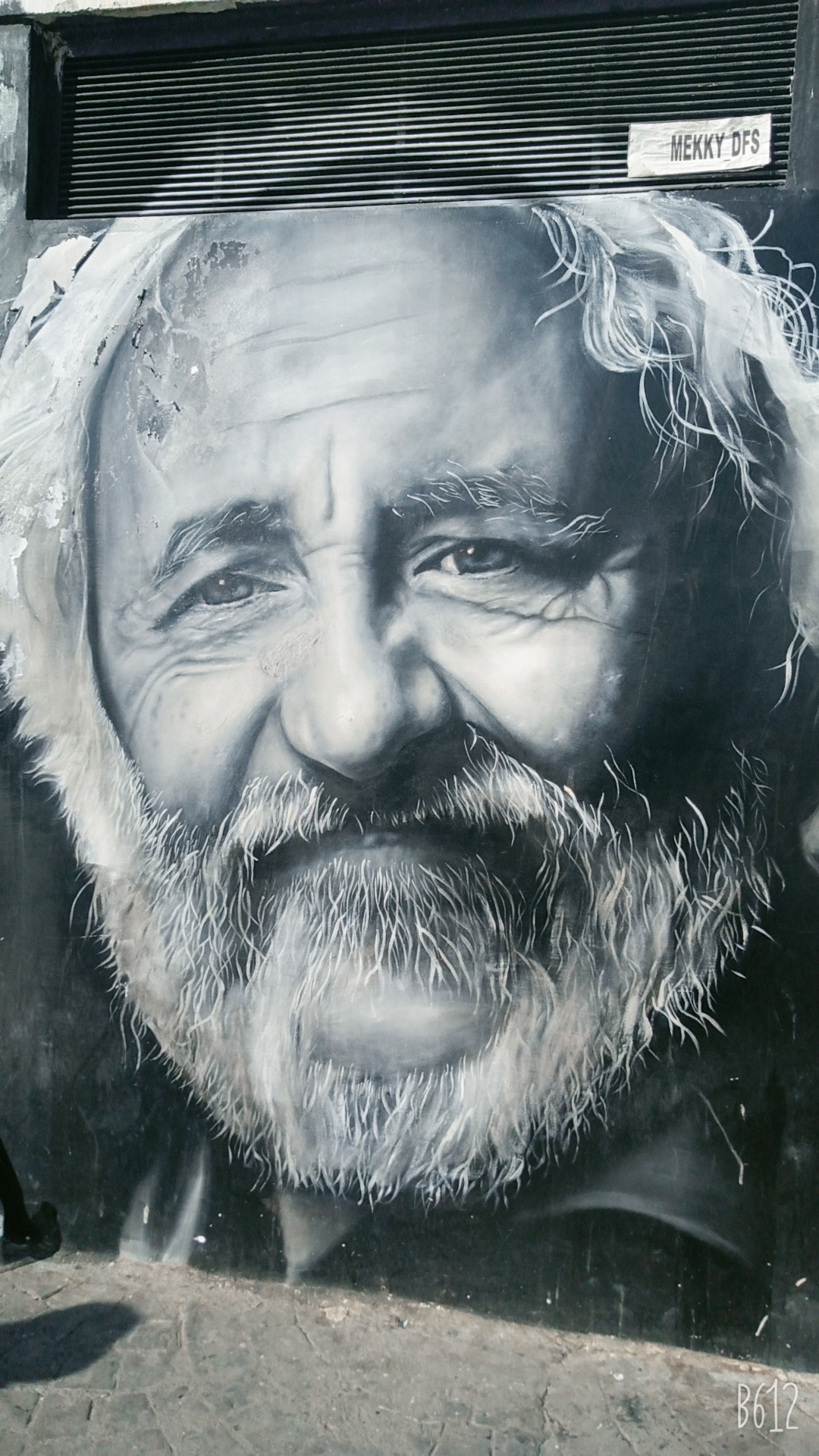
- Born: Amdoukal, Algeria
- Occupation: Actor
- Years active: 1963–2004

Athmane Ariouet (Arabic: عثمان عريوات) is an actor in Algerian cinema, theatre, and television. He is known as a character actor, and has won many awards.

== Early life ==
Ariouet was born in Amdoukal in Barika, in the wilaya of Batna.

As a schoolboy, he wished to become a great actor. He unanimously won the first prize for diction in French. Later, his acting credibility was encouraged by the French teacher Henri Vangret. He then studied Arabic theatre along with prominent actors Mustapha Kasdarli, Taha Laâmiri, and Allal Mouhib.

He first attended the Algiers Conservatory from 1969 to 1972.

== Career ==
Considered as one of the best and most distinguished character actors in Algerian cinema, Ariouet has been awarded multiple times in a career spanned for more than five decades.

His debut acting role was in the 1963 film Le Résultat. In 1981, he acted in the television film The Executioner Cries directed by Abder Isker.

His 1994 cult film Carnaval Fi Dechra, considered as the most relentless caricature of a political system adrift. The film, directed by Mohamed Oukassi, is acomedy film which depicts Algerian society with derision. He was banned from acting after the film. In 2002, he returned to cinema acting with the film El Arch under the presidential permission. In December 2003, he released his debut (as director? producer?) film Er-roubla, co-produced with ENTV.

In 2004, he retired from acting after the film Chronique des années pub, in which he encountered financial difficulties as well as theatrical release ban. However, in 2017 at the forum of the daily El Moudjahid, former Minister of Culture Azzedine Mihoubi said that "the film was in the editing phase", and it was finally released in 2018.

== Awards and recognition ==
In July 2020, Ariouet awarded with national merit medals of "Achir" rank, by President Abdelmadjid Tebboune.

== Filmography ==
Year	Film	Roles	Ref.
1963	Le Résultat		
1967	Molière's miser		
1969	The Sorcerer		
1969	By You and For You		
1971	Archam		
1972	Sketch the Living Dead		
1973	Chaàbia		
1973	Negligence		
1976	The Uprooted		
1976	The Rifles of Mother Karar		
1976	Blessed Hendel		
1978	The Cat		
1983	The Epic of Cheïkh Bouamama		
1985	Buamama	Cheikh Bouamama	
1988	The Village Doctor		
1989	The Choice		
1989	La Rose des sables		
1989	Le Clandestin	Mahfoud	
1991	From Hollywood to Tamanrasset		
1992	Le Pain		
1992	Family Like the Others of Ameur Tribèche		
1992	Two Women		
1994	Carnival fi Dachra	Makhlouf Bombardier	
2002	El Arch		
2003	Er-roubla		
2004	Chronicle of The Pub Years		
