= COVID-19 pandemic in Algeria =

Aspect of viral disease pandemic

- Disease: COVID-19
- Pathogen: SARS-CoV-2
- Location: Algeria
- First outbreak: Wuhan, Hubei, China
- Index case: Blida, Algeria
- Arrival date: 17 February 2020 (6 years, 8 months, 1 week and 3 days)
- Confirmed cases: 272,440
- Recovered: 183,061 (updated 23 July 2023)
- Deaths: 6,881
- Fatality rate: 2.53%
- Vaccinations: 7,840,131 (updated 18 Sep) (total vaccinated); 6,481,186 (updated 18 Sep) (fully vaccinated); 15,267,442 (updated 18 Sep) (doses administered)

Government website
- http://covid19.sante.gov.dz/carte/ https://dz-covid19.com/ http://covid19.cipalgerie.com/en/ https://corona-dz.live/ https://covid19.cdta.dz/

The COVID-19 pandemic in Algeria was a part of the worldwide pandemic of coronavirus disease 2019 (COVID-19) caused by severe acute respiratory syndrome coronavirus 2 (SARS-CoV-2). The virus was confirmed to have spread to Algeria in February 2020. In response, the Algerian government ordered curfews, restricted gatherings, canceled public events, and issued stay-at-home orders between February and June. Some measures were re-implemented in later months in response to new waves of infections. A mass vaccination campaign against COVID-19 began in January 2021. The pandemic disrupted anti-government protests, which largely halted in 2020 and resumed in 2021. 6,881 deaths were officially recorded by the Algerian government through 2022, although the World Health Organization estimated over 21,000 deaths had occurred through 2021.

== Background ==
On 12 January, the World Health Organization (WHO) confirmed that a novel coronavirus was the cause of a respiratory illness in a cluster of people in Wuhan, Hubei, China, who had initially come to the attention of the WHO on 31 December 2019. Unlike SARS of 2003, the case fatality ratio for COVID-19 was much lower, but the transmission was significantly greater, with a significant total death toll. Algerians living in Wuhan were repatriated in early February. On February 12, the Ministry of Health, Population and Hospital Reform announced it was preparing a new emergency plan for handling an outbreak of the virus.

== Timeline ==
=== February 2020 ===
- On 25 February, Algeria laboratory-confirmed its first case of severe acute respiratory syndrome coronavirus 2 (SARS-CoV-2), an Italian man who arrived on 17 February; on 28 February, Algeria deported him back to Italy, via a special flight from Hassi Messaoud Airport where he was subject to quarantine.

=== March 2020 ===
Number of cases (blue) and number of deaths (red) on a logarithmic scale. The evolution is atypical inasmuch as the two lines are not parallel, denoting an important regime change, which can be caused by an excess of deaths or an underestimation of cases before April, compared to what is observed after. For reference, the brown line is the number of deaths minus 370, value for which the trend is parallel to the number of cases (meaning the death toll is proportional to the number of cases).

- On 2 March, Algeria confirmed two new cases of SARS-CoV-2, a woman and her daughter, the health ministry said.
- On the afternoon of 3 March, Algeria reported another two new cases of SARS-CoV-2, which brought the total number of confirmed cases to five. The two new cases were from the same family, a father and daughter, and were living in France. A contact-tracing investigation was begun to identify other potential cases. The Ministry of Health announced on the evening of 3 March that three new cases of SARS-CoV-2 had been registered in Algeria, all from the same family, bringing the total number of cases to eight. On 4 March, the Ministry of Health recorded 4 new confirmed cases of SARS-CoV-2, from the same family, bringing the total number of cases to 12.
- On 12 March, five new cases of COVID-19 were recorded, as well as the first death from the disease. A second death was recorded shortly after. The ministry of Health, Population and Hospital Reform began reporting recoveries, stating that eight patients had recovered. On the same day, schools were locked due to the coronavirus spread, and all cultural events were postponed.
- On 15 March, all sporting events were postponed until April 5 by the ministry of Youth and Sports.
- On 17 March, Friday prayer was suspended and all mosques were ordered to close by the Minister of Religious Affairs. Air and sea travel was suspended between Algeria and several regions of the world, including Europe, North Africa, Arabia, and countries of the Sahel. All international flights were suspended by Air Algérie the next day. The sudden suspension of travel around the world left thousands of Algerian citizens stranded at international airports, and a government plan for repatriation was announced. Many Algerians would not return home until January 2021.
- On 20 March, anti-government protests were called off for the first time in over a year. Many activists who participated in the protests turned to charity work during the pandemic but continued to express dissatisfaction with the government. Activists such as Walid Kechida were arrested for offending the president during the pandemic.
- On 22 March, the Algerian Minister of Health, Abderrahmane Benbouzid, announced that the government would implement stay-at-home orders as the third phase of its pandemic response plan due to the rapid spread of the virus. The first provinces to be affected were Blida and Algiers, where a lockdown began the following day. The order was expanded to nine other provinces on March 27: Batna, Tizi Ouzou, Sétif, Constantine, Médéa, Oran, Boumerdes, El Oued, and Tipaza.
- On 24 March, the Ministry of Communication announced that chloroquine would be used for therapeutic treatment of COVID-19.
- By 31 March, there were a total of 716 confirmed cases and 44 deaths to the disease nationwide.

=== April 2020 ===
- On 1 April, lockdown measures were extended to the provinces of Béjaïa, Aïn Defla, Mostaganem and Bordj Bou Arreridj.
- On 9 April, an extraordinary meeting of OPEC members was held to address the falling price of oil during the pandemic. Algeria's production quota was reduced by 200,000 barrels per day.
- On 19 April, the Ministry of National Education announced Sunday the extension of the suspension of classes for the three education stages to 29 April.
- On 22 April, Algeria received a new donation from China made up of surgical masks, test kits and artificial breathing apparatuses as part of the fight against COVID-19.
- On 24 April, the lockdown measures which were applied in nine provinces, subject to partial containment from 3 p.m. to 7 a.m., were eased to run from 5 p.m. to 7 a.m. The Blida province which was on total lockdown was subject now to partial lockdown from 2:00 p.m. to 7:00 a.m.
- On 25 April, Prime Minister Abdelaziz Djerad issued an instruction to ministerial departments and Republic's Walis (governors of provinces) for the extension of activity sectors and business opening.
- On 27 April, the lockdown measures and the other relevant preventive measures to face COVID-19 were extended for an additional period of 15 days (from April 30 to May 14).
- On 29 April, at the air base of Boufarik, Blida (50-km south of Algiers), Algeria received medical equipment offered by Russia as a contribution to Algeria's efforts to stem the spread of the COVID-19.
- By 30 April, there were a total of 4,006 confirmed cases and 450 deaths.

=== May 2020 ===
- On 3 May, the school year was suspended and the Council of Ministers decided to submit proposals on the best way to finish the school year, with a final decision to be made at the next Council of Ministers meeting.
- On 10 May, the Council of Ministers decided to postpone until September the baccalaureate and intermediate school certificate examinations in the second week of the same month, and canceled the primary school leaving examination while pupils and students will move up into the next classes in the three education cycles by calculating the averages of the first and second terms and reducing the admission average.
- On 14 May, Minister of Health, Population and Hospital Reform Abderahmane Benbouzid said that wearing facemasks would become mandatory, if the spread of the COVID-19 pandemic in Algeria persisted, and the situation was not under control.
- By 17 May, 19 deaths to COVID-19 had been reported among the medical and paramedical staff in Algeria since the outbreak of the epidemic.
- On 21 May, the Prime Ministry decided to suspend the traffic for all vehicles, including motorcycles, during the whole day of the 1st and 2nd days of Eid al Fitr holiday (24 and 25 May). This measure concerned all provinces and remained applicable even outside the hours of partial lockdown, scheduled from 13:00 pm until the next day at 07:00 am.
- On 28 May, the government decided to maintain the partial lockdown until June 13 as part of the measures to fight against the COVID-19 pandemic and to totally lift it in four provinces. Algeria decided to continue the use of the therapeutic protocol based on hydroxychloroquine against COVID-19.
- By 31 May, there were a total of 9,394 confirmed cases and 653 deaths.

=== June 2020 ===
- On 14 June, lockdown measures were lifted in 19 provinces, and hours were adjusted in the remaining 29.
- By 30 June, there were a total of 13,907 confirmed cases and 912 deaths.

=== July 2020 ===
- By 8 July 1700 healthcare professionals had been infected with COVID-19 since the outset of the outbreak in the country in February.
- By 31 July, there were a total of 30,394 confirmed cases and 1,210 deaths.

=== August 2020 ===
- In the meeting of the High Security Council on 3 August 2020, it was decided to "adjust the partial lockdown hours from 11.00 p.m. to 6.00 a.m. in 29 provinces". Boumerdes, Souk Ahras, Tissemsilt, Djelfa, Mascara, Oum El Bouaghi, Batna, Bouira, Relizane, Biskra, Khenchela, M'sila, Chlef, Sidi Bel Abbes, Medea, Blida, Bordj Bou Arreridj, Tipaza, Ouargla, Bechar, Algiers, Constantine, Oran, Setif, Annaba, Bejaia, Adrar, Laghouat and El Oued were the concerned provinces.
- On 9 August, Prime Minister Abdelaziz Djerad decided on the measures for the "gradual and monitored opening of beaches, recreation areas, hotels, cafés and restaurants", while "respecting health protocols of prevention against the spread of Covid-19 pandemic".
- There were 14,100 new cases in August, raising the total number of confirmed cases to 44,494. The death toll increased by 300 to 1,510. At the end of August there were 11,740 active cases.

=== September 2020 ===
- On 1 September, lockdown measures were lifted in 19 provinces, and renewed in 10 others.
- There were 6,874 new cases in September, raising the total number of confirmed cases to 51,368. The death toll rose to 1,726. The number of recovered patients increased to 36,063, leaving 13,579 active cases at the end of the month.

=== October 2020 ===
- There were 6,574 new cases in October, raising the total number of confirmed cases to 57,942. The death toll rose to 1,964. The number of recovered patients increased to 40,201, leaving 15,777 active cases at the end of the month.

=== November 2020 ===
- On 3 November 2020, Algerian President Abdelmadjid Tebboune was reported to have COVID-19 after being flown to Germany for treatment. There were 25,257 new cases in November, raising the total number of confirmed cases to 83,199. The death toll rose to 2,431. The number of recovered patients increased to 53,809, leaving 26,959 active cases at the end of the month. Model-based simulations suggest that the 95% confidence interval for the time-varying reproduction number R_{t} was lower than 1.0 in November and December.

=== December 2020 ===
- In December it was announced that Algeria intended to launch COVID-19 vaccinations in January 2021. President Tebboune returned from two months' hospitalization in Germany, but would return in early January for additional care. There were 16,411 new cases in December, taking the total number of confirmed cases to 99,610. The death toll rose to 2,756. The number of recovered patients increased to 67,127, leaving 29,727 active cases at the end of the month.

=== January to March 2021 ===
- On 10 January, the minister of Culture and Arts, Malika Bendouda, announced plans to reopen theaters and other cultural institutions.
- Mass vaccination commenced on 29 January, initially using 50,000 doses of the Sputnik V COVID-19 vaccine. Shipments of the AstraZeneca and Sinovac vaccines were also received for the vaccination campaign.
- There were 7,637 new cases in January, taking the total number of confirmed cases to 107,247. The death toll rose to 2,893. The number of recovered patients increased to 73,250, leaving 31,104 active cases at the end of the month.
- In February the European Union and the United Nations Development Programme provided medical aid to Algeria including medical equipment, testing kits, and protective clothing. Lockdown measures were extended in 19 provinces on 15 February. Despite the extension, the mass protests against the government which had halted the previous year resumed. President Tebboune appeased protesters by addressing the nation, pardoning several political prisoners, and inviting six political parties to a meeting at the presidential palace. There were 5,753 new cases in February, taking the total number of confirmed cases to 113,000. The death toll rose to 2,985. The number of recovered patients increased to 78,004, leaving 32,011 active cases at the end of the month.
- Lockdown measures were extended in 19 provinces on March 2, and 16 provinces on March 17. There were 4,192 new cases in March, taking the total number of confirmed cases to 117,192. The death toll rose to 3,093. The number of recovered patients increased to 81,538, leaving 32,561 active cases at the end of the month.

=== April to June 2021 ===
- There were 5,119 new cases in April, taking the total number of confirmed cases to 122,311. The death toll rose to 3,261. The number of recovered patients increased to 85,249, leaving 33,801 active cases at the end of the month.
- In May, international travel began to resume. Foreigners were allowed to enter the country if they tested negative for COVID-19 starting on 13 May. On 24 May, Air Algerie announced that international flights would resume in June. There were 6,702 new cases in May, taking the total number of confirmed cases to 129,013. The death toll rose to 3,472. The number of recovered patients increased to 89,839, leaving 35,702 active cases at the end of the month.
- There were 10,613 new cases in June, taking the total number of confirmed cases to 139,626. The death toll rose to 3,716. The number of recovered patients increased to 97,089, leaving 38,821 active cases at the end of the month.

=== July to September 2021 ===
- Recently appointed Prime Minister Aymen Benabderrahmane tested positive on 10 July and was forced to work from home for seven days. Curfews were implemented in 35 provinces on July 26 in response to a new wave of cases. There were 31,766 new cases in July, taking the total number of confirmed cases to 171,392. The death toll rose to 4,254. The number of recovered patients increased to 115,335, leaving 51,803 active cases at the end of the month.
- There were 24,688 new cases in August, taking the total number of confirmed cases to 196,080. The death toll rose to 5,269. The number of recovered patients increased to 133,395, leaving 57,416 active cases at the end of the month.
- There were 7,279 new cases in September, taking the total number of confirmed cases to 203,359. The death toll rose to 5,812. The number of recovered patients increased to 139,309, leaving 58,238 active cases at the end of the month.

=== October to December 2021 ===
- There were 3,093 new cases in October, bringing the total number of confirmed cases to 206,452. The death toll rose to 5,920. The number of recovered patients increased to 141,667, leaving 58,865 active cases at the end of the month.
- There were 4,079 new cases in November, bringing the total number of confirmed cases to 210,531. The death toll rose to 6,071. The number of recovered patients increased to 144,450, leaving 60,010 active cases at the end of the month.
- Algeria's first case of the omicron variant was confirmed on 14 December.
- There were 7,901 new cases in December, bringing the total number of confirmed cases to 218,432. The death toll rose to 6,276. The number of recovered patients increased to 150,084, leaving 62,072 active cases at the end of the month. Modelling by WHO's Regional Office for Africa suggests that due to under-reporting, the true cumulative number of infections by the end of 2021 was around 20 million while the true number of COVID-19 deaths was around 21,491.

=== January to March 2022 ===
- There were 33,685 new cases in January, raising the total number of confirmed cases to 252,117. The death toll rose to 6,579. The number of recovered patients increased to 220,183, leaving 25,355 active cases at the end of the month.
- There were 12,819 new cases in February, bringing the total number of confirmed cases to 264,936. The death toll rose to 6,835. The number of recovered patients increased to 255,334, leaving 2,767 active cases at the end of the month.
- There were 735 new cases in March, bringing the total number of confirmed cases to 265,671. The death toll rose to 6,874. The number of recovered patients increased to 258,637, leaving 160 active cases at the end of the month.

=== April to June 2022 ===
- There were 109 new cases in April, raising the total number of confirmed cases to 265,780. The death toll rose to 6,875. The number of recovered patients increased to 258,864, leaving 41 active cases at the end of the month.
- There were 104 new cases in May, raising the total number of confirmed cases to 265,884. The death toll remained unchanged. The number of recovered patients increased to 258,953, leaving 56 active cases at the end of the month.
- There were 203 new cases in June, raising the total number of confirmed cases to 266,087. The death toll remained unchanged. The number of recovered patients increased to 259,089, leaving 123 active cases at the end of the month.

=== July to December 2022 ===
- There were 1,367 new cases in July, raising the total number of confirmed cases to 267,454. The death toll rose to 6,876. The number of recovered patients increased to 259,569, leaving 1,009 active cases at the end of the month.
- The total number of confirmed cases rose to 270,838 in October. The death toll rose to 6,881. The number of recovered patients increased to 263,876, leaving 81 active cases at the end of the month.
- The total number of confirmed cases rose to 271,090 in November. The death toll remained unchanged.

=== January to December 2023 ===
- The total number of confirmed cases rose to 272,010 in 2023. The official death toll remained unchanged.

== Statistics ==
=== Graphs ===
==== Cumulative number of cases ====
View source data.

==== New cases per day ====
View source data.

==== Deaths per day ====
View source data.

== See also ==
- COVID-19 pandemic in Africa
- COVID-19 pandemic by country and territory
- COVID-19 vaccination in Algeria
