= Ahmed Zeghdar =

Algerian politician

- أحمد زغدار
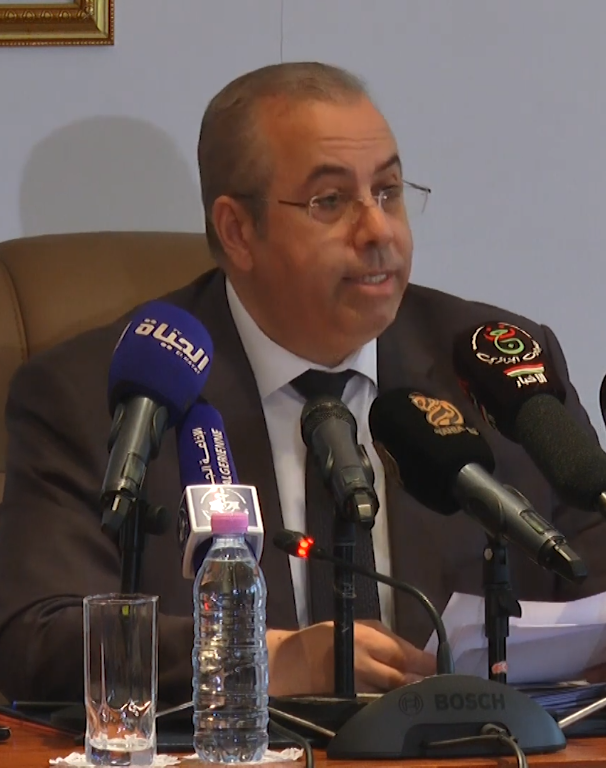
- Zeghdar in 2022

Minister of Industry
- In office 7 July 2021 – 18 March 2023
- President: Abdelmadjid Tebboune
- Prime Minister: Aymen Benabderrahmane
- Preceded by: Mohamed Bacha
- Succeeded by: Ali Aoun

Personal details
- Born: April 17, 1966 (age 60) Algiers, Algeria
- Children: 4
- Education: Algiers 1 University (Mag, GDip, PhD)

Ahmed Zeghdar (Note: Arabic: أحمد زغدار) (born 17 April 1966) is an Algerian politician who served as Minister of Industry from 2021 to 2023. He served as a deputy in the People's National Assembly from 2017 to 2021.

== Education ==
Zeghdar holds a Magister in Economic Sciences (1998), a Diploma in Chartered Accountant (2001) and a Doctorate in Economics (2005) from the Algiers 1 University.

== Personal life ==
Zeghdar is married and has four children.
