= 2024 in Algeria =

- Decades: 2000s; 2010s; 2020s
- See also: History of Algeria; List of years in Algeria

Events in the year 2024 in Algeria.

== Incumbents ==
- President: Abdelmadjid Tebboune
- Prime Minister: Nadir Larbaoui

== Events ==
=== June ===
- 8–9 June: Riots break out in Tiaret over mandated water rationing in response to droughts and drained reservoirs.

=== July ===
- 30 July: Algeria withdraws its ambassador from France after the latter declares its support for the Western Sahara Autonomy Proposal, which was proposed by Morocco in 2007.

=== August ===
- 9 August: Imane Khelif wins a gold medal at the women's welterweight boxing competition of the 2024 Summer Olympics in Paris amid a row over misinformation regarding her gender.
- 31 August: The BRICS New Development Bank authorizes Algeria as a new bank member.

=== September ===
- 7 September: 2024 Algerian presidential election: Incumbent President Abdelmadjid Tebboune is re-elected for a second term with 84% of the vote.
- 9 September: At least five people are reported killed following floods in the Algerian Sahara.
- 17 September: Abdelmadjid Tebboune is inaugurated for a second term as president.
- 26 September: Algeria imposes visa requirements on Moroccans, accusing them of criminal activity in its territory, including "Zionist espionage" and "drug and human trafficking".

=== October ===
- 11 October: A Swiss tourist is reported killed in unspecified circumstances.
- 31 October: Journalist Ihsane El Kadi is released after from prison after receiving a pardon from President Tebboune along with 4,000 prisoners on the occasion of the 70th anniversary of the Algerian War of Independence.

== Deaths ==
- 30 October: Tahar Zbiri, 95, military officer, chief of staff (1964–1967), participant of the 1965 coup d'état and leader of the 1967 coup attempt.
- 9 November: Rachid Mekhloufi, 88, football player (Saint-Étienne, France national team) and manager (national team).

== See also ==
- Algeria at the 2024 Summer Olympics
- COVID-19 pandemic in Africa
- 2020s
- African Union
- Arab League
- al-Qaeda in the Islamic Maghreb
- Islamic State of Iraq and the Levant – Algeria Province
