= COVID-19 vaccination in Algeria =

- Date: 29 January 2021
- Location: vaccination clinics
- Cause: COVID-19 pandemic
- Participants: 2,500,000 doses administered Sputnik V and Oxford-AstraZeneca (6 June 2021); 2,500,000 Total vaccinated people (to which the first and second dose of vaccine were administered)
- Footage: https://corona-dz.live/

On 29 January 2021, Algeria launched a COVID-19 vaccination campaign, a day after receiving its first shipment of 50,000 doses of Russia's Sputnik V vaccine. As of 6 June 2021, around 2.5 million doses have been administered. Algeria is currently vaccinating its population with both Sputnik V and Oxford-AstraZeneca vaccines.

== Background ==
=== Data Reporting ===
Algeria has reported on administering over 2.5 million doses of the vaccine. Data is only reported every few weeks or months apart without secondary dose information.

== History ==
=== Timeline ===
==== January 2021 ====
On 28 January 2021, Algeria received 50,000 doses of Russia's Sputnik V vaccine which landed at Algiers International Airport. On the very next day, 29 January, Algeria launched a coronavirus vaccination campaign.

==== February 2021 ====
On 1 February, 50,000 doses of the Oxford–AstraZeneca COVID-19 vaccine arrived.

On 25 February 2021, Algeria received 200,000 more vaccines from China.

==== April 2021 ====
364,800 doses of the Oxford-AstraZeneca vaccine were delivered on 3 April through the COVAX pillar.

On 7 April, minister Lotfi Benbahmad announced that an agreement had been reached to produce Sputnik V at Saidal's manufacturing plant in Constantine.

On 26 April, the U.S. provided more than 600,000 doses of the Johnson & Johnson COVID-19 vaccine.

==== August 2021 ====
By the end of the month, 4.1 million vaccine doses had been administered.

==== September 2021 ====
By the end of the month, 10.2 million vaccine doses had been administered.

==== October 2021 ====
By the end of the month, 11.2 million vaccine doses had been administered while 27% of the target population had been fully vaccinated.

==== November 2021 ====
By the end of the month, 12.1 million vaccine doses had been administered while 30% of the target population had been fully vaccinated.

==== December 2021 ====
By the end of the month, 12.5 million vaccine doses had been administered while 31% of the target population had been fully vaccinated.

==== January 2022 ====
By the end of the month, 13 million vaccine doses had been administered while 32% of the target population had been fully vaccinated.

==== April 2022 ====
By the end of the month, 15 million vaccine doses had been administered while 6.5 million persons had been fully vaccinated.

== Progress ==
Cumulative vaccinations in Algeria

View source data.

Daily vaccinations chart of Algeria

View source data.
