= Mohamed Tarek Belaribi =

Algerian politician

- محمد طارق بلعريبي
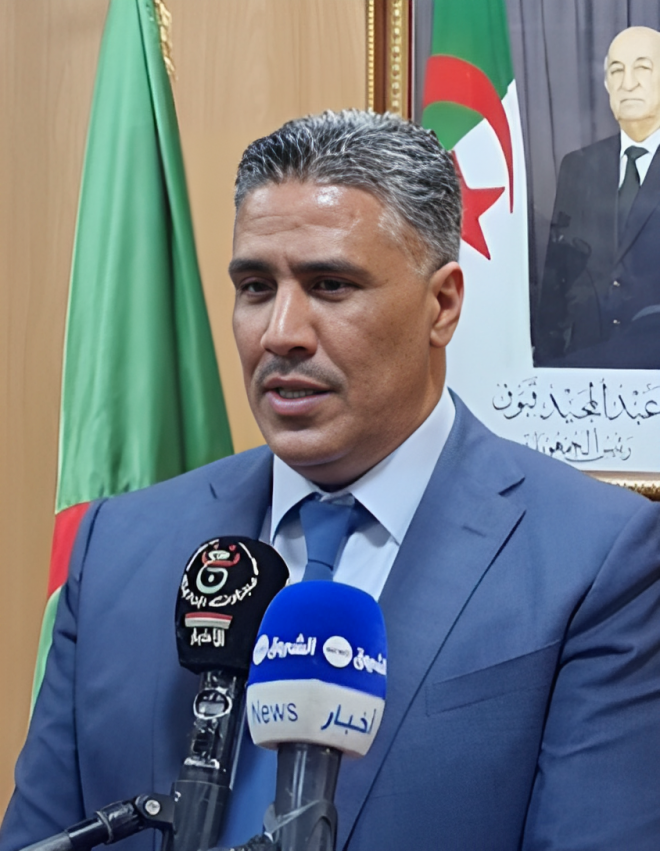
- Belaribi in 2021

Minister of Housing, Urban Planning, Cities and National Planning
- Incumbent
- Assumed office 21 February 2021
- President: Abdelmadjid Tebboune
- Prime Minister: Abdelaziz Djerad; Aymen Benabderrahmane; Nadir Larbaoui; Sifi Ghrieb
- Preceded by: Kamel Nasri

Personal details
- Born: 21 February 1972 (age 54) Algiers, Algeria

Mohamed Tarek Belaribi (Arabic: محمد طارق بلعريبي; born 21 February 1972) is the Algerian Minister of Housing, Urban Planning, Cities and National Planning. He was appointed as minister on 21 February 2021.

== Biography ==
=== Education ===
Belaribi holds a Bachelor in Civil Engineering.

=== Professional and political career ===
Belaribi began his professional career as a Civil Engineer at the Cosider group. He later worked as an Engineer at CTC and served as a Project Manager at the National Real Estate Promotion Company (ENPI), where he also held the position of General Director.

From 2015 to 2017, Belaribi served as the General Director of the National Agency for Housing Improvement and Development (AADL). He was later reappointed as General Director of AADL in January 2021, before becoming the Minister of Housing in February 2021. Belaribi is the youngest son of former Minister for the Interior Daho Kabila Belaribi.
