= Boualem Boualem =

Algerian politician (1952–2026)

- بوعلام بوعلام

Cabinet Director of the Presidency of the Republic of Algeria
- In office 11 November 2023 – 5 October 2026
- President: Abdelmadjid Tebboune
- Preceded by: Nadir Larbaoui
- Succeeded by: TBD

Member of the Council of the Nation
- In office 11 January 2007 – March 2012
- Succeeded by: Kemoune Aek

Personal details
- Born: 16 October 1952 Aïn Sefra, French Algeria
- Died: 5 October 2026 (aged 73) Geneva, Switzerland
- Party: RND
- Occupation: Jurist

Boualem Boualem (Arabic: بوعلام بوعلام; 16 October 1952 – 5 October 2026) was an Algerian politician of the Democratic National Rally (RND).

== Life and career ==
Born in Aïn Sefra on 16 October 1952, Boualem represented the RND in the Council of the Nation from 2007 to 2012 and served on the supervisory committee of the 2012 parliamentary election. On 8 October 2015, then-President Abdelaziz Bouteflika appointed him head of telephone-tapping agency Onpolitic. The agency was tasked with monitoring telephone and electronic communication. After Bouteflika stepped down, he was able to maintain his influence in Algerian politics. He was notably able to keep general Ali Ghediri in detention. From then on, he was dubbed President Abdelmadjid Tebboune's "secret ear".

Boualem's rising influence in Algerian politics continued to surprise observers. On 11 November 2023, he replaced Nadir Larbaoui as Tebboune's Cabinet Director in the intermediary and was made permament in January 2024. Algérie-Focus wrote that the appointment was part of Tebboune's plan to ensure government continuity. In October 2025, a decree was issued announcing the termination of Boualem's duties. However, he remained in office before temporarily disappearing from the public view in May 2026. He reappeared the following month. Talks of his departure resurfaced in September 2026.

Boualem died in Geneva on 5 October 2026, at the age of 73.
