= Djamel Ould Abbes =

Algerian Politician (1934–2026)

Djamel Ould Abbes (Arabic: جمال ولد عباس; February 24, 1934 – November 18, 2026) was an Algerian doctor and politician.

Djamel Ould Abbes (2018)

== Life and career ==
Abbes was born February 24, 1934, in Tlemcen. He served as the Minister of National Solidarity, Family and National Community Abroad (2003–2010), Minister of Health, Population and Hospital Reform (2010–2012), Minister of Labour, Employment and Social Security (2012), Senator (2013–2019), and Secretary General of the National Liberation Front.

He died in Algiers on November 18, 2026, aged 92.
