= 2026 Blida attacks =

Suicide bombings in Blida, Algeria

2026 Blida Attacks
- Part of Insurgency in the Maghreb (2002–present)
- Locations bombed: Near the intersection of Rue de la Palestine and Boulevard Mohamed Boudiaf. Near the intersection of Rue Belkacem El Ouazri and Boulevard Mohamed Boudiaf. Approximate location of the two perpetrator's bodies.
- Location: Blida, Algeria
- Date: 13 April 2026; 13:00~ (UTC +1)
- Target: Algerian police
- Weapon: Explosive belt
- Deaths: 2 (2 perpetrators)
- Injuries: 1+
- Perpetrator: Sleeper cell
- Assailants: Unknown, a man and a women
- No. of participants: 2
- Motive: Anti-Christian sentiment (likely)

On April 13, 2026, two suicide bombings occurred in the city of Blida in Algeria, 40-50 kilometers south-west of the capital Algiers. The attacks coincided with the visit of Pope Leo XIV to Algeria.

== Attacks ==
On April 13, 2026, Pope Leo XIV visited Algeria on his 11-day African tour, marking the first Papal visit to the country. In the afternoon, Pope Leo gave a speech in the Djamaa el Djazaïr in Algiers, accompanied by the mosque's rector Mohamed al-Mamoun al-Qassimi al-Hassani.

Around the same time, a double suicide bombing occurred 40 km (25 mi) away in Blida, supposedly targeting both the city's police station and a sports complex. A witness told Jeune Afrique: "It was about 1:00PM, I was 200 meters away eating lunch when I heard an explosion then a second one. Outside the crowd was shocked...I heard the owner of the restaurant describe that a man wearing a qashabiya exploded himself meters away from a police officer." CCTV footage shows a man wearing a qashabiya advancing towards the sidewalk, where two police officers were talking to each other. One of the officers turns to approach the man in the qasahbiya, who activates his explosive belt, sending him multiple meters away, the blow hits the police officer but he gets up shortly after. A man with a yellow umbrella is seen injured after the strike, a few minutes later, a photo circulates of the area where a white cloth is drapped on a body. The second suicide bomber was reportedly shot by police officers but had enough time to launch their explosive belts.

== Perpetrators ==
Both perpetrators, one man and one woman, died in the blast. No group has claimed the attack. News outlets have reported the suspected motive is Anti-Christian sentiment. Algerian analyst Akram Kharief told Le Figaro he suspected the attack "was...for media purposes, carried out by a micro-group or lone wolves."

== Aftermath ==
After the two attacks, multiple bomb alerts were reported in Blida. Four other bombs were defused, all targeting public spaces or police. The El Rahba market was encircled by the Algerian BRI. Multiple local administrations closed and baricaded their staff inside their establishments.
