= Abdenour Keramane =

Algerian politician

Abdenour Keramane was the Algerian minister for industry and mines in the 1992 government of Belaid Abdessalam.

Keramane was amongst those injured in the attack that killed Algerian head of state Mohamed Boudiaf.
