= Yassine Merabi =

Algerian politician

- ياسين ميرابي
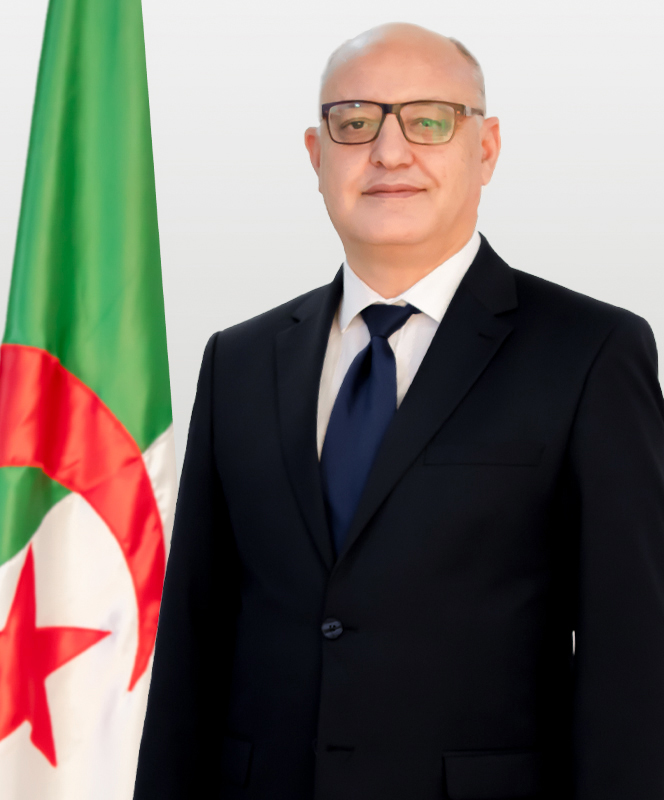

Minister of Vocational Education and Training Professionals
- Incumbent
- Assumed office 7 July 2021
- President: Abdelmadjid Tebboune
- Prime Minister: Aymen Benabderrahmane; Nadir Larbaoui
- Preceded by: Hoyem Benfreha

Personal details
- Born: August 7, 1966 (age 60)
- Education: Oran 1 University (GDip, Mag, PhD)

Yacine Merabi (Arabic: ياسين ميرابي; born 7 August 1966) is the Algerian Minister of Vocational Education and Training Professionals. He was appointed as minister on 7 July 2021.

== Education ==
Merabi holds a Diploma in Philosophy (1990), a Magister in Philosophy (2009) and a Doctor of Philosophy from the Oran 1 University.
