= Saidal =

Algerian pharmaceutical company

Saidal Group
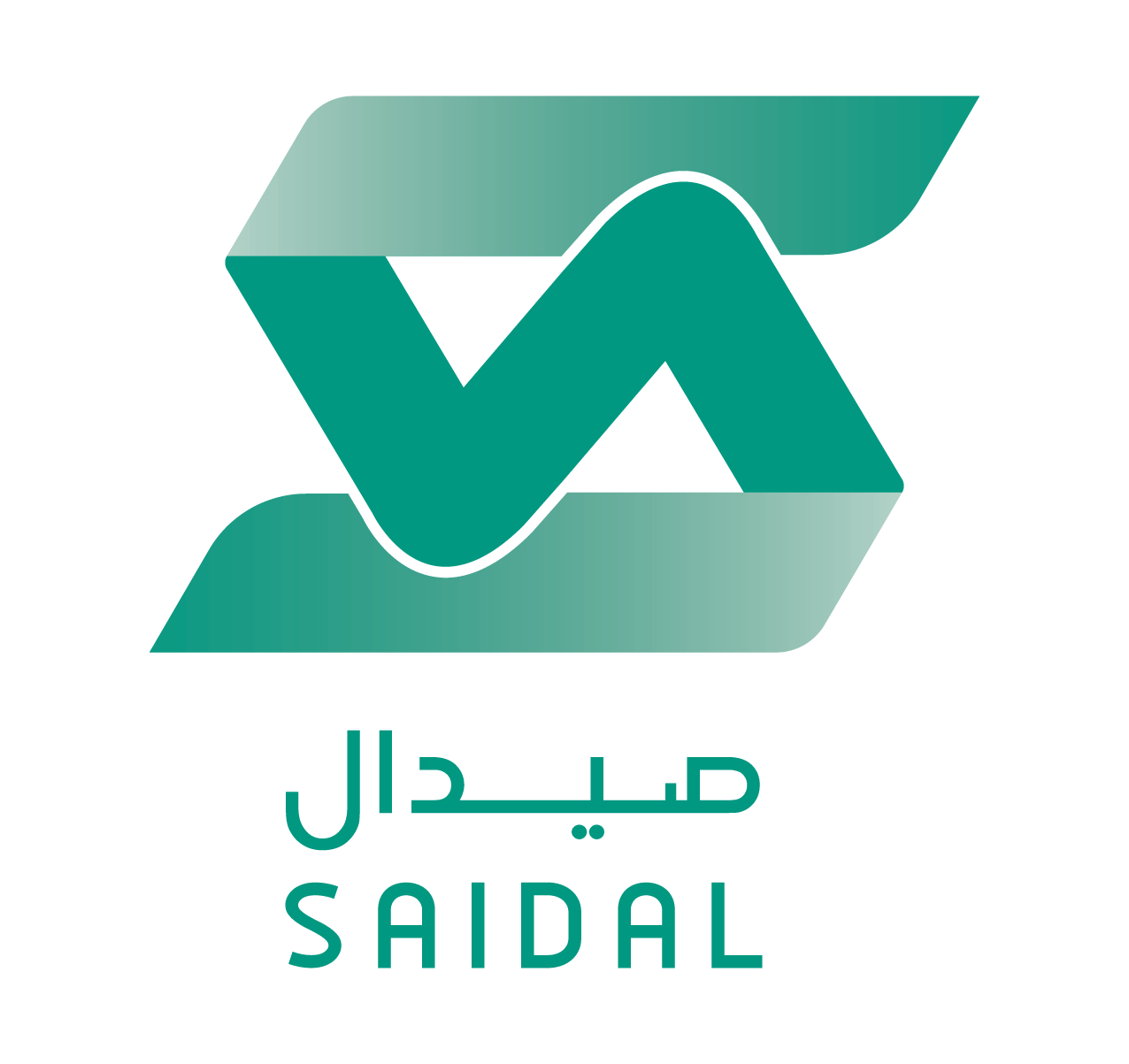
- Native name: مجمع صيدال
- Type: State-owned company
- Traded as: Algiers Stock Exchange: SAI
- Industry: pharmaceuticals
- Founded: 1982; 44 years ago
- Headquarters: Algiers, Algeria
- Key people: Ouacim Kouidri (CEO)
- Products: antibiotics, generics
- Production output: pharmaceuticals
- Revenue: US$982 million (2006)
- Number of employees: 4,300 (2006)
- Website: saidalgroup.dz

Saidal Group (Arabic: مجمع صيدال, French: Groupe Saïdal) is an Algerian pharmaceutical company created in 1982. Saidal Group is the largest pharmaceutical company in Algeria and one of the largest in Africa.

Saidal Group exports its products to Ivory Coast, Gabon, Senegal, Cameroon, Mali, Democratic Republic of the Congo, Republic of the Congo, Niger, Togo, Benin, Guinea-Bissau, Chad and Mauritania.

== History ==
Saidal's logo from 1982 to 2022

Saidal was created in April 1982 following the restructuring of the Algerian Central Pharmacy. In 1985, it changed its name to become Saidal.

In 1989, Saidal became an economic public company, one of the first national companies to acquire the status of joint stock company in 1993. In 1997, Saidal was transformed into an industrial group to which Biotic, Pharmal, and Antibiotical were attached.

In March 2022, the group announced the launch of its first bioequivalence center called "Equival".

== Company management ==
Saïdal has been headed by :

- Ali Aoun (1995–2008)
- Rachid Zahouani (2008–?)
- Boumediene Derkaoui (2010–2015)
- Mohamed Hammouche (2015–2016)
- Yacine Tounsi (2016 – 3 January 2018)
- Mohamed Nouas (3 January 2018 – 11 February 2020)
- Fatouma Akacem (11 February 2020 – 10 April 2023)
- Wassim Kouidri (10 April 2023 – present)
