= Abdelwahab Bekli =

Algerian politician (1940–2026)

Abdelwahab Bekli (Arabic: عبد الوهاب بكلي; 1940 – 20 February 2026) was an Algerian politician.

== Life and career ==
Bekli served as Minister of Tourism and Handicrafts of Algeria from 19 July 1992 to 21 August 1993.

Bekli died on 20 February 2026, at the age of 86.
