= Le Clandestin =

- Arabic: التاكسي المخفي
- Starring: Athmane Ariouet; Yahia Benmabrouk
- Release date: 1989 (Algeria)
- Running time: 90 minutes
- Country: Algeria
- Language: Algerian Arabic

Le Clandestin (also known as Taxi el makhfi التاكسي المخفي, Algerian Arabic for "The Clandestine Taxi") is an Algerian comedy film directed by Benamar Bakhti, produced in 1989 (or 1991), starring Athmane Ariouet and Yahia Benmabrouk. It's considered one of the most remarkable films in Algerian cinema.

== Plot ==
A group of people trying to travel from Bou Saâda, M'Sila to Algiers who are unable to find a suitable mean of transport. They finally have to use an illegal taxi operation "un clandestine" of a poor man who has many children. Comedian conversations and many troubles take place during the trip.

== Cast ==
- Athmane Ariouet
- Yahia Benmabrouk
- Hamza Feghouli
- Ouardia Hamtouche
- Arezki Rabah
- Rachid Fares
- Sissani
- Himoud Brahimi
- Aziz Anik
