= Noureddine Djoudi =

Algerian diplomat (1934–2026)

Noureddine Djoudi (1934 – 14 March 2026) was an Algerian diplomat and politician.

== Life and career ==
Djoudi was born in Algiers in 1934. He obtained a bachelor's degree in English literature in Montpellier and in 1955, he enrolled in a university in London, where he represented the National Liberation Front, before heading on a short visit to the United States, and then joined the ranks of the National Liberation Army units on the western border of the country.

He was nicknamed the dean of Algerian diplomats, and was a resistance mujahideen during the Algerian War.

Following independence, Djoudi continued a diplomatic march, leading him to several African capitals, including Nairobi, Dar es Salaam, Lagos, Luanda, Pretoria etc. He was also active in Algeria's support for liberation movements in Africa, especially in Angola, Mozambique, and the Congo.

Djoudi died in Algiers on 14 March 2026, at the age of 92.
