= Noureddine Ben Omar =

Algerian director (1951–2025)

Noureddine Ben Omar (Arabic: نور الدين بن عمر; 1951 – 14 August 2025) was an Algerian film and television director.

== Life and career ==
Ben Omar was born in French Algeria in 1951. He began his career in the 1970s working as an actor and theatre director before joining the National Television Corporation of Oran. He produced documentaries including Liqa and Rainbow.

Ben Omar died in Oran on 14 August 2025, at the age of 74.
