= Madani Naamoun =

Algerian actor (1944–2025)

- Born: 7 March 1944
- Died: 15 July 2025
- Citizenship: Algeria
- Occupation: Actor

Madani Naamoun (Arabic: مدني نعمون; 7 March 1944 – 15 July 2025) was an Algerian actor.

== Life and career ==
Naamoun was born in Algiers on 7 March 1944. He began performing in the theatre from a young age. At the age of ten, he participated in the appreciation of children's programs on the radio. When he was 17 years, he fought in the Algerian War, following which he returned to acting.

Throughout his career he acted in a number of television dramas.

Naamoun died on 15 July 2025, at the age of 81.
