= 2014 Algerian protests =

The 2014 Algerian protests or Barakat Revolution was mass protests and a wave of nonviolent demonstrations (some episodes of violence) against president Abdelaziz Bouteflika’s plans for a fourth term, ending up winning the 2014 Algerian presidential election despite boycotts and opposition protests, which is dispersed usually by Tear gas. Thousands continued to resist the violence for the next 2 months.

The protests began with rallies and demonstrations by young-Berber students, demanding reform to the political system and calls for people to protest. Despite the protests and acts of civil nonviolent disobedience, strikers and young masked youth used violence against the security forces, igniting tensions and confrontations with the military in Kabylie. Hostile slogans against the government was heard during the demonstrations.

70 protesters were injured and hundreds were arrested during the demonstrations, including accusations of crackdowns (by Human Rights Watch) and violence against protesters in the Southern regions. In Algiers, thousands participated in the next few weeks in March-April in protests calling for broader reforms and the rejection of the fourth term. There are no concessions made with protesters and their demands aren’t met.

== See also ==
- 2010-2012 Algerian protests
- 2019-2020 Algerian protests
