= Miloud Khetib =

Algerian-born French actor (1945–2025)

- Born: 15 February 1945; Orléansville, French Algeria
- Died: 20 November 2025 (aged 80); Marseille, France
- Occupation: Actor

Miloud Khetib (15 February 1945 – 20 November 2025) was an Algerian-born French actor.

After the independence of Algeria, Khetib moved to Paris and became a member of the Théâtre de l'Épée de Bois. He was also a member of the Comédie-Française and the Théâtre Nanterre-Amandiers. On screen, he appeared in films such as Les Sacrifiés and Morituri, both directed by Okacha Touita.

Khetib died in Marseille on 20 November 2025, at the age of 80.
