= Djelloul Baghli =

Algerian politician

Djelloul Baghli was the Algerian minister for professional training in the 1992 government of Belaid Abdessalam.
