= Sid Ali Lazazi =

Algerian footballer (1957–2025)

Personal information
- Date of birth: 20 September 1957
- Place of birth: Hussein Dey, French Algeria
- Date of death: 11 August 2025 (aged 67)
- Positions: Midfielder; forward

Youth career
- 1970–1977: NA Hussein Dey

Senior career*
| Years | Team | Apps | (Gls) |
| 1977–1991 | NA Hussein Dey | | |

International career
| 1981 | Algeria | 2 | (0) |
- * Club domestic league appearances and goals

Sid Ali Lazazi (Arabic: سيد علي لعزازي; 20 September 1957 – 11 August 2025) was an Algerian footballer who played as a midfielder and a forward.

Lazazi won the 1978–79 Algerian Cup with NA Hussein Dey and helped bring the team to the finals of the 1978 African Cup Winners' Cup. He played in two matches for the Algeria national team in 1981.

Lazazi died on 11 August 2025, at the age of 67.
