= Issaâd Dhomar =

Algerian footballer (1933–2025)

Personal information
- Date of birth: 27 July 1933
- Place of birth: El Biar, French Algeria
- Date of death: 18 August 2025 (aged 92)
- Position: Defensive midfielder

Senior career*
Years	Team	Apps	(Gls)
1952–1958	SCU El Biar		
1962–1967	JS El Biar		

International career
1963	Algeria	2	(0)

Managerial career
- 1965–1966: JS El Biar
- * Club domestic league appearances and goals

Issaâd Dhomar (Arabic: إسعاد دوّمار; 27 July 1933 – 18 August 2025) was an Algerian footballer who played as a defensive midfielder. He played from 1952 to 1968 and served as president of the Algerian Football Federation from 1984 to 1986.

== Career ==
Born in El Biar on 27 July 1933, Dhomar played for SCU El Biar and JS El Biar. He played in two matches for the Algeria national team: a match against Bulgaria on 6 January 1963 and against Czechoslovakia on 26 February 1963. His leadership at the Algerian Football Federation saw the country's qualification for the 1986 FIFA World Cup.

== Death ==
Dhomar died on 18 August 2025, at the age of 92.
