= Soraya Mouloudji =

Algerian politician

- صورية مولوجي
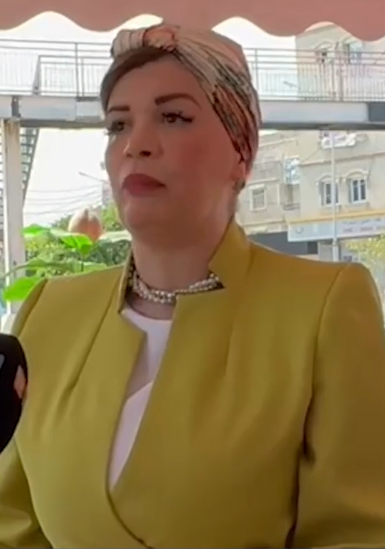
- Mouloudji in 2024

Minister of Culture and Arts
- Incumbent
- Assumed office 19 February 2022
- President: Abdelmadjid Tebboune
- Prime Minister: Aymen Benabderrahmane; Nadir Larbaoui
- Preceded by: Wafaa Chaalal

Personal details
- Born: 8 October 1977 (age 48)

Soraya Mouloudji (Arabic: صورية مولوجي; born 8 October 1977) is the Algerian Minister of Culture and Arts. She was appointed as minister on 19 February 2022. She was succeeded by Zouhir Ballalou.

== Education ==
Mouloudji holds a Doctorate in Translation and Anthropologie.
