= Omar Aktouf =

Algerian-born Canadian consultant and academic (1944–2025)

- Ɛumer Aktuf
- Born: 22 October 1944; Algeria
- Died: 2 April 2025 (aged 80); Montreal, Quebec, Canada
- Education: University of Algiers; Panthéon-Sorbonne University; HEC Montréal
- Occupations: Consultant; Academic

Omar Aktouf (Kabyle: Ɛumer Aktuf; 22 October 1944 – 2 April 2025) was an Algerian-born Canadian consultant and academic. He served as a professor at HEC Montréal and was a founding member of several humanist and globalist organizations. He also served on the scientific council of ATTAC Québec.

== Life and career ==
Born on 22 October 1944, Aktouf earned a degree in psychology from the University of Algiers and a diplôme d'études approfondies in industrial psychology from Panthéon-Sorbonne University. He then earned a Master of Business Administration and a doctorate in administration from HEC Montréal.

Before arriving in Canada, Aktouf held various positions in Algerian companies. He then became a consultant at various Canadian firms, such as the Desjardins Group, as well as other large firms from France, Algeria, Tunisia, and Morocco. He also taught at HEC Montréal in the 1980s.

Aktouf engaged in Canadian politics with the Union des forces progressistes and the New Democratic Party, earning 14% of the vote in the 2004 federal election in Outremont. The following year, he was a signatory of the Manifeste pour un Québec solidaire. He was recognized by the Bibliothèque et Archives nationales du Québec and the Canadian Broadcasting Corporation as one of the key figures in Quebec business and economics.

Omar Aktouf died in Montreal on 2 April 2025, at the age of 80.

== Works ==
- Le travail industriel contre l'homme (1986)
- La stratégie de l'autruche. Post-mondialisation, management et rationalité économique (2002)
- Le management entre tradition et renouvellement (2006)
- Halte au gâchis ! En finir avec l’économie management à l’américaine (2008)
