= Ali Aoun =

Algerian politician

- علي عون
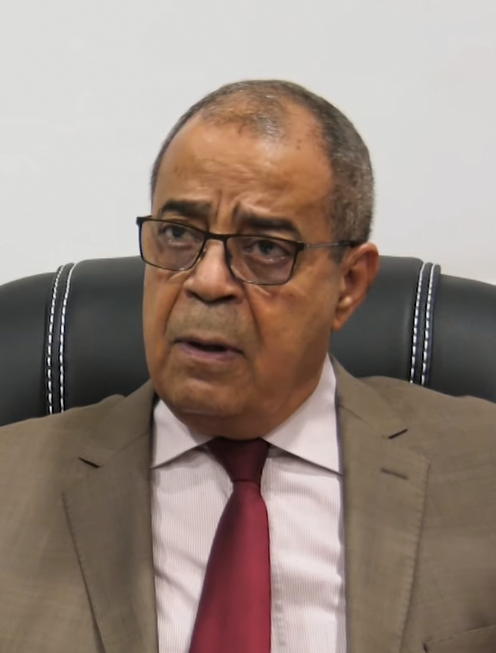

Minister of Industry and Pharmaceutical Production
- In office 18 March 2023 – 19 november 2024
- President: Abdelmadjid Tebboune
- Prime Minister: Aymen Benabderrahmane; Nadir Larbaoui
- Preceded by: Ahmed Zeghdar
- Succeeded by: Sifi Ghrieb

Personal details
- Born: May 6, 1946 (age 79) Tamacine, Touggourt, French Algeria
- Children: 4

Ali Aoun (Arabic: علي عون; born 6 May 1946 in Tamacine), is an Algerian politician who served as the Minister of Industry since March 2023. He was succeeded by Sifi Ghrieb.

== Biography ==
=== Early life and education ===
After obtaining his degree in Industrial Chemistry Engineering from the Saint-Luc Mons Institute in Belgium in 1972, Aoun began his professional career in the chemical industry in Algeria.

=== Career ===
Aoun held several executive positions in the chemical and pharmaceutical industry in Algeria. He was unit director at the National Chemical Industries Company (SNIC) from 1974 to 1979, central director at SNIC from 1979 to 1982, and CEO of the National Enterprise for Detergents and Cleaning Products (ENAD) from 1983 to 1985.

In 1986, Aoun became sub-director, then director of chemistry, pharmacy, and fertilizers at the Ministry of Industry, before becoming CEO of the Saidal Group from 1995 to 2008. He was also a lecturer at the National Institute of Light Industries in Boumerdès from 1984 to 1986.

In 2009, Aoun became a consultant in organization and business management before becoming CEO of the Central Pharmacy of Hospitals from April 2022 to September 2022.

=== Trials ===
In March 2007, he was sentenced to two years in prison in the context of the Khalifa affair. Re-tried, he was sentenced to a suspended prison sentence in 2020, then acquitted in 2022.

On 20 April 2026, Aoun was sentenced to five years' imprisonment for corruption by the Economic and Financial Criminal Court in Algiers over the irregular sale of ferrous and non-ferrous metal waste.
