= Hamza Feghouli =

Algerian actor (1938–2025)

- حمزة فغولي
- Born: 11 September 1938; Tiaret, French Algeria
- Died: 28 March 2025 (aged 86); Blida, Algeria
- Occupation: Actor

Hamza Feghouli (Arabic: حمزة فغولي; 11 September 1938 – 28 March 2025) was an Algerian actor.

Feghouli died in Blida on 28 March 2025, at the age of 86.

== Filmography ==
=== Film ===
- Hold up à Mascara (1981)
- Hassan Niya (1989)
- Le Clandestin (1989)
- L'Honneur de la tribu (1993)
- Beur Blanc Rouge (2006)
- Morituri (2007)

=== Television ===
- Café de Mimoun (2012)
- Dar El Djirane (2012)
- Boudhou (2013–2016)
- Rayeh Djey (2015)
- Kaid Ezzamane (2019)
