= Ihsane El Kadi =

Algerian journalist

- إحسان القاضي
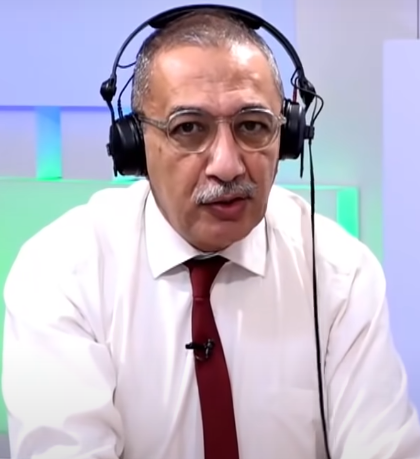
- Born: April 27, 1959 (age 67); Tripoli, United Kingdom of Libya
- Education: University of Algiers
- Occupations: Journalist; Activist

Ihsane El Kadi (Arabic: إحسان القاضي; born 27 April 1959) is an Algerian journalist and press freedom activist who founded the media outlets Maghreb Émergent and Radio M, among the few independent outlets in Algeria until their dissolutions in 2023. A noted critic of the government and a prominent leader during the Hirak protest movement, El Kadi has been arrested and charged with multiple offences, most recently being sentenced to five years in prison in 2023 for the "foreign financing of his business" in a trial that human rights organisations have denounced as unfair and unjust.

== Early life ==
El Kadi was born in Tripoli in what was then the Kingdom of Libya where his father Bachir was working for the National Liberation Front (FLN), the principal Algerian nationalist movement, managing one of its intelligence stations in Libya transporting weaponry into Algeria. The family remained in Libya following Algeria's independence in 1962 while Bachir served as a member of Algeria's diplomatic mission to the country, before returning to Algeria in 1964, when El Kadi's father became a member of the FLN's central committee under the country's first president, Ahmed Ben Bella. Bachir El Kadi retired from public life following the 1965 Algerian coup d'état by Houari Boumédiène, following which many of Ben Bella's supporters were arrested and imprisoned.

El Kadi studied economics at the University of Algiers where he was active in the Revolutionary Communist Group, an underground Trotskyist movement founded by trade unionists and Pabloists. In 1980, he took part in the Berber Spring advocating for the rights of the Berbers during which he was first arrested and imprisoned.

== Journalism career ==
El Kadi first began working as a journalist during the early 1980s, gaining prominence in Algeria's independent press. During the Algerian Civil War between 1991 and 2002, El Kadi was the editor-in-chief of the French-language newspaper La Tribune, which gained recognition for its investigations into individuals who had disappeared during the conflict between the Algerian government and various Islamist rebel groups. Journalists were common targets of the Armed Islamic Group of Algeria during this time.

In June 2007, El Kadi was a leading figure during the founding of Les Afriques, the first pan-African financial newspaper written by journalists based on the continent. El Kadi served as the newspaper's economics and politics editor based in Algiers. In 2008, El Kadi founded Maghreb Émergent, an online newspaper focusing on economic news from the Maghreb, and subsequently founded Radio M, a private radio station broadcasting to the Maghreb. El Kadi's media outlets have been described as among the few independent media groups in Algeria, and have been noted as often been critical of the country's government and its actions, particularly during the presidencies of Abdelaziz Bouteflika and Abdelmadjid Tebboune

== Arrest and imprisonment ==
On 10 June 2021, during the Hirak protests triggered by Bouteflika's decision to stand for a fifth presidential term, and shortly before the 2021 Algerian parliamentary election was scheduled to take place, El Kadi was arrested, alongside opposition politician Karim Tabbou and fellow journalist Khaled Drareni, the North African representative for Reporters Without Borders. The three were subsequently prohibited from speaking to the media about their arrests.

In June 2022, El Kadi was tried at a Sidi M'Hamed court in relation to an article published on 23 March 2021 in which he called for the integration of followers of all ideologies, including Islamists, into the reform movement. He was sentenced to six months imprisonment and a fine of 50, 000 dinars but did not ultimately serve a custodial sentence.

El Kadi was arrested again near midnight on 24 December 2022 at his home in Boumerdès by six plainclothes police officers, during which time the offices of Maghreb Émergent and Radio M in Algiers were searched and sealed by Algerian authorities. El Kadi was subsequently remanded on the basis of breaching article 95 of the penal code in relation to alleged articles he had published and donations he had received, which were accused of threatening state security. He was initially held at the El Harrach prison in Algiers.

On 16 January 2023, the Algerian judiciary confirmed El Kadi's ongoing "preventative detention", setting a trial date of 12 March. Several charges against El Kadi were dropped, though he continued to be accused of being financed by foreign sources. El Kadi's defence team stated the only foreign donation El Kadi received was from his daughter, who resided in the United Kingdom and was a partner in his business. They accused the Algerian government of violating the country's constitution and El Kadi's basic right to a fair trial after the government prevented them from properly advising El Kadi.

On 28 March 2023, the state prosecutor announced its intention to seek a five year custodial sentence for El Kadi. On 2 April 2023, the court in Sidi M'Hamed found El Kadi guilty of the "foreign financing of his company" and received a five-year sentence, with three years suspended. Upon appeal, the sentence was increased to seven years, five of which were suspended, on 18 June 2023. In addition, Interface Media, which ran Maghreb Émergent and Radio M, were ordered to be dissolved, with the company and El Kadi being fined a total of 11.7 million dinars.

On 12 October 2023, the Supreme Court of Algeria rejected an appeal to the Court of Cassation filed by El Kidane's lawyers, ending his last legal recourse to reverse his sentence.

On 1 November 2024, El Kadi was released after a presidential pardon granted on the occasion of the seventieth anniversary of the Algerian War of Independence.

== International response ==
In January 2023, Reporters Without Borders denounced the "judicial harassment" El Kadi had received in a statement sent to the United Nations, calling on the Special Rapporteur to "immediately" call on the Algerian government to comply with its international and constitutional obligations. Khaled Drareni stated that the ongoing Russian invasion of Ukraine and Algeria's subsequent emergence as an oil and gas supplier to countries in southern Europe following the ban on Russian oil and gas made them wary to speak out against the government's actions.

On 4 January 2023, a week after El Kadi's arrest, the online magazine Orient XXI republished his article that had prompted his arrest, in which he criticised the Algerian People's National Army's stronghold on the country's presidency. In the subsequent weeks, numerous prominent figures and organisations called for El Kadi's release, including the Nobel Peace Prize laureate Dmitry Muratov and the human rights organisation Amnesty International. A petition started by Reporters Without Borders garnered over 10, 000 signatures in one month calling for El Kadi's immediate release.

On 11 May 2023, the European Parliament adopted a resolution calling on El Kadi's "immediate and unconditional release", a few weeks prior to a state visit to France by the Algerian president, Abdelmadjid Tebboune. MEPs called on European Union institutions and members to raise the issue of press freedom with Algerian officials.

An op ed in Le Monde calling on El Kadi's release was signed by writers including Noam Chomsky, Annie Ernaux, Ken Loach and Arundhati Roy was published on 30 May 2023, stating he had been "unjustly detained and convicted".

An open letter to Abdelmadjid Tebboune in January 2024, calling on a presidential pardon for El Kadi, was signed by notable Algerian figures including Maïssa Bey, Yasmina Khadra, Louisette Ighilahriz, Fellag, Merzak Allouache, Kaouther Adimi, Mohamed Kacimi, Nadia Kaci, Elias Zerhouni, Noureddine Melikechi and Salim Bachi.

In 2025, El Kadi was awarded the German Prize for the Freedom and Future of the Media (de).
