= Sifi Ghrieb =

Prime Minister of Algeria since 2025

- سيفي غريب
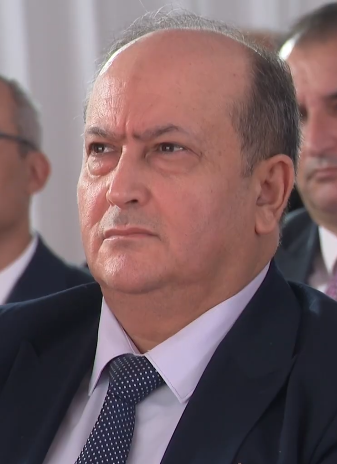
- Ghrieb in August 2026

21st Prime Minister of Algeria
- Incumbent
- Assumed office 28 August 2025 (Note: Acting: 28 August – 14 September 2025)
- President: Abdelmadjid Tebboune
- Preceded by: Nadir Larbaoui

Minister of Industry
- In office 19 November 2024 – 15 September 2025
- President: Abdelmadjid Tebboune
- Prime Minister: Nadir Larbaoui; Himself (acting)
- Preceded by: Ali Aoun
- Succeeded by: Yahia Bachir

Personal details
- Born: 1971 (age 54–55) Tébessa, Algeria
- Party: Independent
- Education: Badji Mokhtar Annaba University (PhD)
- Occupation: Politician

Sifi Ghrieb (Arabic: سيفي غريب, romanized: Sayfī Gharīb; born 1971) is an Algerian politician who is serving as the Prime Minister of Algeria since September 2025.

== Early life ==
Ghrieb was born in 1971 in Tébessa. He holds advanced degrees in industrial engineering and economics and a Ph.D. in physical chemistry of materials from the Badji Mokhtar Annaba University in Annaba.

== Professional career ==
In his career, he has managed several major industrial complexes and state-owned companies, including Sider and Imetal. Sifi Ghrieb also served as the Director-General of the Industrial University under the Ministry of Industry, and as the Director-General of the Cement Industry Training Center, affiliated with the Industrial Cement Group of Algeria (GICA).

Prior to joining the Algerian government, his last role was Chairman of the Board of the Qatari-Algerian joint venture Algerian Qatari Steel (AQS).

== Political career ==
In the Second Larbaoui government, he was appointed Minister of Industry on November 19, 2024, succeeding Ali Aoun in this position.

On 28 August 2025, he was named interim Prime Minister following the dismissal of Nadir Larbaoui. He retained his role as Minister of Industry and Pharmaceutical Production. After being considered for the position, his appointment was confirmed on 14 September 2025, and he was tasked with forming a new government.

== Notes ==
Political offices
Preceded by Nadir Larbaoui	Prime Minister of Algeria; 2025–present	Incumbent
