= List of Panthéon-Assas University people =

This is a list of notable persons who have had ties to Panthéon-Assas University.

== Notable alumni ==
- Manuel Aeschlimann, former member of the French National Assembly
- Michèle Alliot-Marie, former French minister of justice, minister of the interior, minister of defence, minister of foreign and European affairs, minister of youth affairs and sports, member of the French National Assembly and former president of the Rally for the Republic
- Antoine Andraos, member of the Lebanese Parliament
- Gabriel Attal, former Prime Minister of France
- Martine Aubry, first secretary of the Socialist Party of France, mayor of Lille, former minister of social affairs, minister of labour, employment and vocational training, and member of the French National Assembly
- Joaquim Barbosa, chief justice of Brazil
- François Baroin, member of the French National Assembly, former French minister of finance, minister of the interior, and minister for overseas territories
- Martine Billard, member of the French National Assembly
- Yves Bot, advocate general of the European Court of Justice
- Mohamed Najib Boulif, Moroccan minister delegate for general affairs and governance
- Franck Boulin, former secretary-general of the Assembly of Kosovo
- Christine Boutin, former French minister of housing and the city, and former member of the French National Assembly
- Bernard Carayon, member of the French National Assembly
- Sabino Cassese, judge of the Constitutional Court of Italy and former Italian minister of civil service
- Anna Chalon, French singer-songwriter and guitarist
- Claire Chazal, journalist
- Claude Chirac, advisor to former President of France Jacques Chirac
- Jean-Paul Cluzel, president of the Réunion des musées nationaux et du Grand Palais des Champs-Élysées, LGBT rights activist, former general inspector of finances and former managing director of the Paris Opera
- Jean-Marie Colombani, director of Le Monde from 1994 to 2007
- Milica Čubrilo, Serbian ambassador to Tunisia and former Serbian minister of diaspora
- Rachida Dati, member of the European Parliament and former French minister of justice
- Olivier De Schutter, legal scholar and United Nations Special Rapporteur
- Patrick Devedjian, member of the French National Assembly, former minister in charge of the implementation of the recovery plan, minister of industry, minister of local liberties and advisor to former President of France Nicolas Sarkozy
- Sophie De Wit, member of the Belgian Chamber of Representatives, former member of the Flemish Parliament
- Francisco Javier Domínguez Brito, Dominican minister of labour, former attorney general of the Dominican Republic and senator for the province of Santiago
- Emmanuel Gaillard, chairman of the International Arbitration Institute and former professor at Harvard Law School
- Nadim Gemayel, member of the Lebanese Parliament
- Henri Giscard d'Estaing, French businessman and son of former President of France Valéry Giscard d'Estaing
- Claude Goasguen, member of the French National Assembly and former minister
- Bruno Gollnisch, member of the European Parliament and former member of the French National Assembly
- Mattias Guyomar, French judge at the European Court of Human Rights
- Pierre Damien Habumuremyi, prime minister of Rwanda and former minister of education of Rwanda
- Éric Halphen, French judge
- Raphaël Haroche, French singer-songwriter and actor
- Gahoun Georges Hégbor, former member of the National Assembly of Togo and former Togolese minister of communication and civic education
- Anne-Marie Idrac, former secretary of State for foreign trade and former member of the French National Assembly
- Dali Jazi, former Tunisian minister of defence, minister of higher education, and minister of public health
- Yves Jégo, member of the French National Assembly and former secretary of State for Overseas
- Giorgos Kaminis, mayor of Athens and former Greek ombudsman
- Assad Kotaite Secretary-General and Council President of the International Civil Aviation Organization
- Axelle Lemaire, member of the French National Assembly
- Corinne Lepage, member of the European parliament, former French minister of the environment
- Jean-Marie Le Pen, president of the Front National, member of the European Parliament and former member of the French National Assembly
- Marine Le Pen, president of the Front National, member of the European Parliament
- Gérard Longuet, member of the Senate of France, former member of the French National Assembly, former member of the European Parliament, former minister of posts and former minister of defence
- Ivan Lozowy, Ukrainian political activist and founder of the Institute for Statehood and Democracy in Ukraine
- Victorin Lurel, minister of overseas France and former member of the French National Assembly
- Alain Madelin, former French minister of economy and finance, former minister of posts, former member of the French National Assembly, former president of Démocratie Libérale
- Marion Maréchal-Le Pen, member of the French National Assembly
- Carlos Eduardo Medellín Becerra, former ambassador of Colombia to the United Kingdom, and former minister of justice and law of Colombia
- Jamshid Momtaz, former member and chairman of the International Law Commission
- Éric de Montgolfier, French judge
- Hervé Morin, leader of the New Centre, member of the French National Assembly and former minister of defence
- Khalid Naciri, former minister of communications and spokesperson of the government of Morocco
- Alexandre Najjar, Lebanese writer
- Néstor Osorio Londoño, permanent representative of Colombia to the United Nations, former permanent representative of Colombia to the International Coffee Organization and executive director of the International Coffee Organization, former and first permanent representative of Colombia to the World Trade Organization
- Prokopis Pavlopoulos, president of Greece, former member of the Hellenic Parliament and former Greek minister of the interior
- Alain Pellet, former member and chairman of the International Law Commission
- Saddek Rabah, Algerian researcher and Professor
- Daniel Picouly, French writer
- Panagiotis Pikrammenos, former interim prime minister of Greece and former president of the Greek Council of State
- Jean-Pierre Raffarin, member of the Senate of France, former member of the European Parliament, and former prime minister of France and former minister of commerce and industry
- Manuela Ramin-Osmundsen, former Norwegian minister of children and equality
- Raymond Ranjeva, former vice-president of the International Court of Justice
- Philippe Risoli, television presenter
- Jean-Luc Romero, French politician, writer and leader of non-governmental organizations
- Édouard Étienne de Rothschild, businessman
- Catherine Samba-Panza, first female president of the Central African Republic
- Julio Mario Santo Domingo Braga, Brazilian socialite
- Jacques Schwarz-Bart, jazz saxophonist
- Nicolas Sehnaoui, Lebanese minister of telecommunication
- Christiane Taubira, French minister of justice, former member of the French National Assembly and former member of the European Parliament
- Vassiliki Thanou-Christophilou, caretaker Prime Minister of Greece from 27 August to 21 September 2015 and former President of the Greek Court of Cassation
- Pol Theis, interior designer and founder of P&T Interiors
- Jean Tiberi, member of the French National Assembly, mayor of the 5th arrondissement of Paris and former mayor of Paris
- Daniel Turp, member of the National Assembly of Quebec
- Evangelos Venizelos, president of the Panhellenic Socialist Movement, member of the Greek Parliament, former deputy prime minister of Greece, former Greek minister of finance, minister of national defence, minister of culture and sport, minister of development, minister of justice, minister of transport and communications, and minister of the press and the media
- Dominique de Villepin, former prime minister of France, former minister of the interior and former minister of foreign affairs
- Éric Woerth, member of the French National Assembly, former French minister of budget and minister of labour
- Gaël Yanno, former member of the French National Assembly
- Adán Augusto López Hernández, former governor of the Mexican State of Tabasco and secretary of the Mexican Secretariat of the Interior.

== Notable faculty ==
- Fabrice d'Almeida
- Edmond Alphandéry, former French minister of economy
- Philippe Ardant, former president of the Constitutional Court of the principality of Andorra and former president of the Arab World Institute
- Jean-Michel Blanquer, former Minister of Education joined the faculty in 2022 as professor of civil and constitutional law.
- Frank Bournois
- Jean Carbonnier
- Serge Guinchard
- Jean-Claude Martinez, member of the European Parliament and former member of the French National Assembly
- David Naccache, forensic expert and member of the Computer Science Laboratory of the École normale supérieure
- Hugues Portelli, member of the Senate of France
- Jacques Robert
- Roger-Gérard Schwartzenberg, member of the French National Assembly, former minister of research and former member of the European Parliament
- Georges Vedel, member of the Académie française and former member of the Constitutional Council of France
- Louis Vogel
- Prosper Weil, member of the Académie des sciences morales et politiques
