= CCFF =

CCFF can stand for:

- Canadian Cystic Fibrosis Foundation
- Common Compiler Feedback Format
- Le Congrès de la Culture Française en Floride, an academic competition for students of French held in Orlando, Florida
- The letters "C C F F" occur at the four count in SMPTE Universal Leader
