= Hichem Sofiane Salaouatchi =

Algerian politician

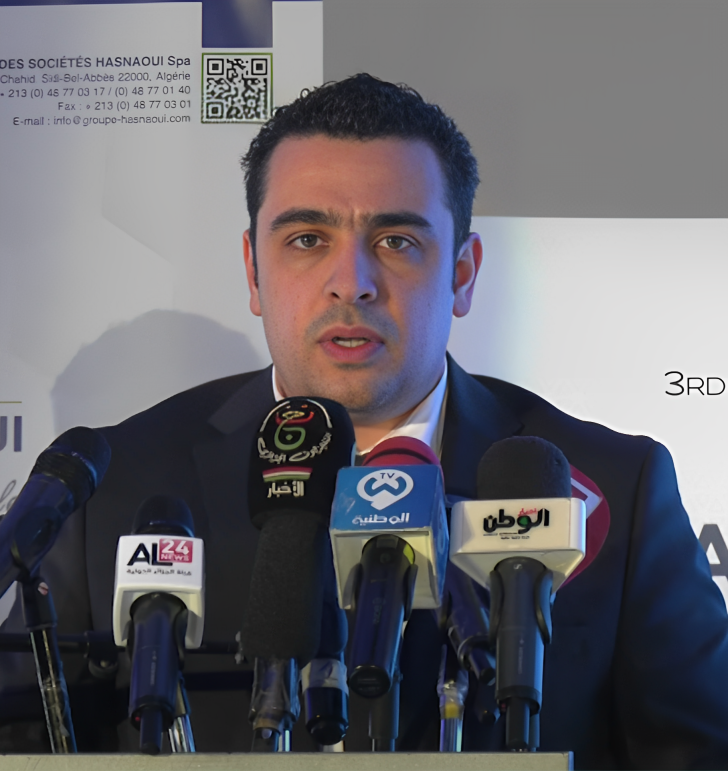

Minister of Fishing and Fishery Productions
- In office 7 July 2021 – 16 March 2023
- President: Abdelmadjid Tebboune
- Prime Minister: Aymen Benabderrahmane
- Succeeded by: Ahmed Bidani

Personal details
- Born: August 26, 1983 (age 43)
- Education: Blida 1 University (MSc); Algiers 3 University (PhD)

Hichem Sofiane Salaouatchi (born 26 August 1983) is an Algerian politician. Previously he had served as Minister of Fishing and Fishery Productions from 7 July 2021 until 16 March 2023.

== Education ==
Salaouatchi holds a Bachelor in Accounting from the University of Algiers 3, a Master in Management from the University of Blida and a Doctorate in Management from the University of Algiers 3.
