= Abderrahmane Benkhalfa =

Algerian politician (1949–2021)

Abderrahmane Benkhalfa عبد الرحمان بن خالفة
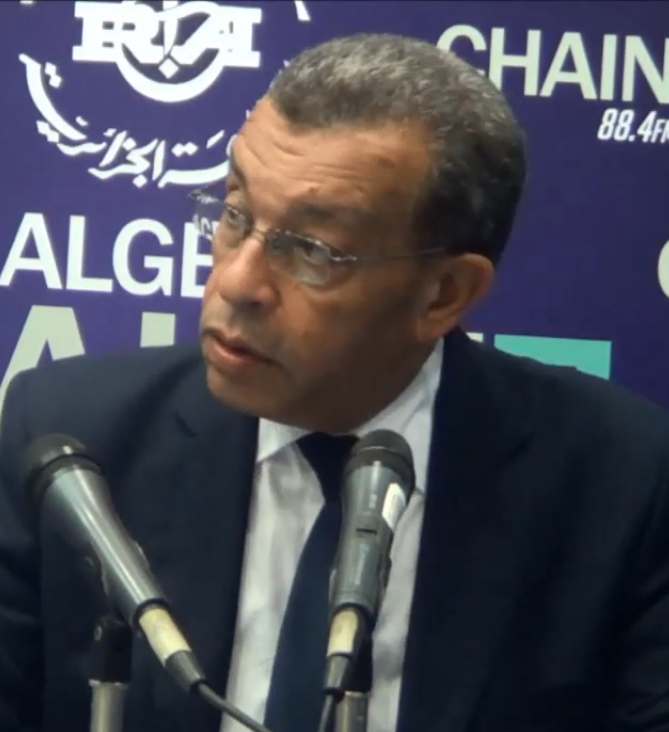
- Benkhalfa in 2015

Minister of Finance
- In office 14 May 2015 – 11 June 2016
- President: Abdelaziz Bouteflika
- Prime Minister: Abdelmalek Sellal
- Preceded by: Mohamed Djellab
- Succeeded by: Hadji Baba Ammi

Personal details
- Born: Abderrahmane Benkhalfa; 2 July 1949 Tiaret, French Algeria
- Died: 23 April 2021 (aged 71) Algiers, Algeria
- Party: National Liberation Front
- Education: University of Algiers; University of Grenoble

Abderrahmane Benkhalfa (Arabic: عبد الرحمان بن خالفة, July 2, 1949 – April 23, 2021) was an Algerian financial expert. He was general delegate for the Algerian Association of Banks and Financial Institutions, and director of the Bank of Algeria. He was Algerian Minister of Finance. He was also a member of the Finance and Credit Council at the Bank of Algeria. He was described as being pro-private-sector.

== Education ==
He obtained a bachelor's in commercial and financial sciences from the Superior College of Business at the University of Algiers, and went on to obtain a doctorate in management sciences from the French University of Grenoble in 1977. He also attended a specialization course at the University of Warsaw in Poland.

== Death ==
On 23 April 2021, Benkhalfa died at Aïn Naadja Military Hospital, Algiers, from complications related to COVID-19.

Political offices
Preceded by Mohamed Djellab	Minister of Finance; 2015–2016	Succeeded by Hadji Baba Ammi
