= Suzanne Carrell =

American educator (1923–2019)

- Born: Suzanne Jeanne Tarbouriech; March 6, 1923; Albi, France
- Died: April 21, 2019 (aged 96); St. Augustine, Florida
- Citizenship: Franco-American
- Occupation: educator
- Years active: 1954 - 2019
- Known for: Alliance Française of Jacksonville (Florida)
- Board member of: Congress of French Culture in Florida
- Awards: Legion of Honour, National Order of Merit (France), Chevalier of the Order of Academic Palms

Academic background
- Education: Master's degree
- Alma mater: University of Algiers

Academic work
- Discipline: French as a Foreign Language
- Sub-discipline: Humanities
- Institutions: Jacksonville University

Suzanne Carrell (March 6, 1923 – April 21, 2019) was an American educator and recipient of the awards of the Order of Academic Palms, the Legion of Honor, and the National Order of Merit in honor for her service to France. She was the co-founder of the Jacksonville, Florida chapter of the Alliance Française and was a key member of the Congress of French Culture in Florida, based in Orlando.

== Early life and education ==
Carrell was born in Albi, France in 1923. After the Second World War, she studied at the University of Algiers, where she graduated with a Master's degree in foreign language and the humanities. In 1954, she became an instructor at Jacksonville University after moving to the city with her husband, who was an American Army captain.

== Career ==
In 1961, Carrell co-founded a local chapter of the Alliance Française in Jacksonville. By the following year, she facilitated the relocation of the existing Congress of French Culture in Florida to the Jacksonville University campus, where it would remain for several years. Carrell continued her work as the university expanded until, in 1974, she was finally granted the opportunity to head a new department devoted entirely to the study of the French language.

For its duration between 1980 and 1986, Carrell was an active promoter of the sister city program between Jacksonville and Nantes. As part of this promotion, a scholarship was made available by the French government through the Congress of French Culture, la Bourse Suzanne Carrell, that made it possible for meritorious students of French to spend a summer studying in France.

After her retirement in 1989, Carrell continued to be an active member in all of her organizations and was highly praised for her work in strengthening the cultural ties between the United States and France.

== Awards and recognition ==
In 1967, Carrell was decreed a Knight of the Order of Academic Palms.

In 1980, a scholarship open to participants of Congress of French Culture in Florida was established in her name and continues to this day.

In 2002, Carrell was awarded the French Legion of Honor by then-President Jacques Chirac.

In 2012, Carrell was awarded the National Order of Merit by the Consul General of France Gaël de Maisonneuve.
