= Algeria–Uzbekistan relations =

- Algeria: Uzbekistan

Envoy
- Algerian ambassador to Uzbekistan Jamila Achour: Uzbek ambassador to Algeria Mansurbek Kilichev

Algeria–Uzbekistan relations refer to the bilateral relations between Algeria and Uzbekistan. Algeria recognized the independence of Uzbekistan and established diplomatic relations on June 30, 1992. Algeria has an embassy in Tashkent. Uzbekistan is accredited to Algeria through its embassy in Cairo.

== History ==
On June 11, 2026, Uzbek foreign minister, Bakhtiyor Saidov, travelled to Algiers and met with Algerian president, Abdelmadjid Tebboune, where the two discussed deepening trade, political dialogue, and multilateral ties. Saidov also met with Minister of Foreign Affairs of Algeria, Ahmed Attaf, where they both discussed ways to strengthen cooperation between trade and economic and investment cooperation. They also spoke about how the two nations could deepen ties on cooperation between culture and humanitarianism. Both nations also signed a memorandum of understanding between each other, as well as an agreement on the two between mutual exemption of holders of diplomatic passports from visa requirements. Saidov had also met with Minister of Foreign Trade and Export Promotion of Algeria, Kamel Rezig, about increasing trade turnover.

On August 21, 2026, Algerian ambassador to Uzbekistan, Jamila Achour, met with Deputy Foreign Minister of Uzbekistan, Bakhromjon Aloyev, in Tashkent, and discussed expanding bilateral ties between the two nations, specifically in the field of trade.

== High-level visits ==
High level visits from Algeria to Uzbekistan

- Jamila Achour (August 21, 2026)

High level visits from Uzbekistan to Algeria

- Bakhtiyor Saidov (June 11, 2026)

== See also ==
- Foreign relations of Algeria
- Foreign relations of Uzbekistan
