= Kaïd Ahmed =

Algerian nationalist and politician

Kaid Ahmed
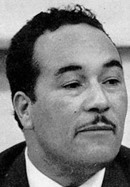
- Born: March 17, 1921; Tiaret
- Died: March 5, 1978 (aged 56); Rabat
- Other name: Commandant Sliman
- Occupations: politician, nationalist
- Political party: FLN

Kaïd Ahmed (Commandant Sliman) (March 17, 1921 – March 5, 1978) was an Algerian nationalist and politician.

== Early life ==
Born on March 17, 1921, at Tiaret, Si Ahmed was born into a family of small landowners installed in Sidi Belgacem. Sidi Belgacem is located in the town of Tagdemt not far from Mina and on lands of the former capital of Emir Abdelkader. His father, a former communal guard was tortured and murdered by the French army in 1957 in Mostaganem.

From a young age, Si Ahmed had the sense of a deeply committed leader with a strong spirit and a sense of responsibility and action. He continued his primary and secondary studies at Tiaret. he was made aware of the misdeeds of the colonial policy and the precarious state of Algerians that resulted. A man of action, he campaigned openly and realized very early on the situation of segregation suffered by the Algerian people. After completing his military service during World War II in 1939–45, he campaigned within UDMA.

== Nationalist movement ==
Then he was elected Municipal Councillor and Deputy Mayor of Tiaret from 1951 to 1954. He became secretary of the UDMA journalist and a daily Oran in August 1953, and moderated the region of Tiaret an awareness campaign on the situation in the country and local elections, as well as arrange for three Tagdempt days, the congress of the youth of UDMA.

== Algerian Revolution ==
Kaïd Ahmed moved to Algiers in 1954 to make contact with various members of the national movement and with the leaders of CRUA and the OS. In 1955, he carried the weapon to become the Commander Slimane in the Area 8 of the Wialya 5 along with Colonel Lotfi, Then becoming a member of the General Staff of the ALN alongside Colonels Boussouf, Othman including Boumediène Chief of Staff of which he became a close.

in 1961 he was one of the ALN representatives in the talks and the negotiations with France, which led to 'ceasefire' and the signing of Evian agreements.

During the war of national liberation, Si Slimane participate actively in structuring the FLN organization and the supply of weapons of the ALN.

== After the independence ==
In 1962, he became Deputy Minister of Tourism and Government of the first People's Democratic Republic of Algeria; He left in 1964 after a 'blurring' with President Ben Bella. On 19 June 1965 he returned as a Member of Council of the Revolution and Minister of Finance, over four years he made strong efforts to organize the country's financial institutions, plan and launch initial development plans as well as the first special plans Wilaya. In 1969, he was appointed Head of the FLN party until 1974, when he disagreed with President Boumédiène regarding the implementation of the Agrarian Revolution and the injustice it would create. He left Algeria for security reasons and moved to France and later to Morocco where he died at March 5, 1978 in Rabat from a heart attack, he was repatriated and buried in Tiaret

== See also ==
- Benali Boudghène
