= Mourad Medelci =

Algerian politician (1943–2019)

Mourad Medelci مراد مدلسي
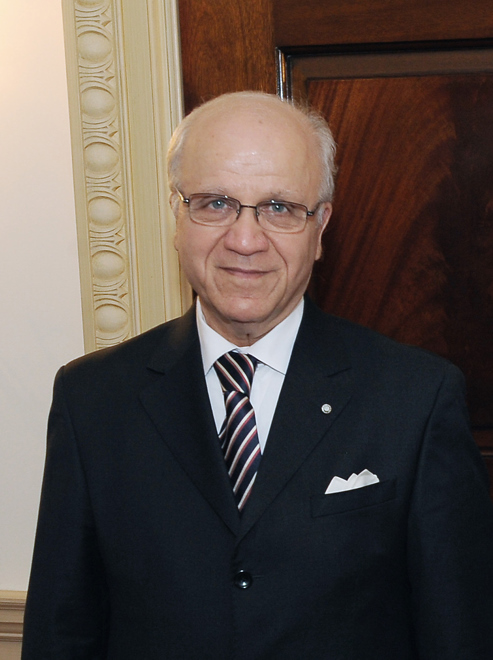
- Medelci in 2012

Minister of Foreign Affairs
- In office 4 June 2007 – 11 September 2013
- Preceded by: Mohammed Bedjaoui
- Succeeded by: Ramtane Lamamra

Minister of Finance
- In office May 2001 – June 2002
- President: Abdelaziz Bouteflika
- Preceded by: Abdelatif Benachenhou
- Succeeded by: Mohamed Terbéche
- In office May 2005 – June 2007
- President: Abdelaziz Bouteflika
- Preceded by: Abdelatif Benachenhou
- Succeeded by: Karim Djoudi

Personal details
- Born: 30 April 1943 Tlemcen, Algeria
- Died: 28 January 2019 (aged 75) Algiers, Algeria
- Education: University of Algiers

Mourad Medelci (Arabic: مراد مدلسي; 30 April 1943 – 28 January 2019) was an Algerian politician who served in the government of Algeria as Minister of Foreign Affairs from 2007 to 2013. He was President of the Constitutional Council of Algeria from 2013 until his death in 2019.

== Early life ==
Born in Tlemcen on 30 April 1943, Medelci studied economics at the University of Algiers, receiving his bachelor's degree in 1966 and master's degree in 1968. From 1970 to 1980 he worked in the private sector before entering public service as Secretary-General of the Ministry of Trade in 1980. He was married with five children.

== Political career ==
Medelci was Minister of Trade from 1988 to 1989 and Deputy Minister for the Budget from 1990 to 1991. He was again Minister of Trade from 1999 to 2001, then Minister of Finance from 2001 to 2002. From 2002 to May 2005 he was Adviser to the President, Abdelaziz Bouteflika. In May 2005 he became Minister of Finance again, serving in that position until he became Minister of State for Foreign Affairs on 4 June 2007.

After serving more than six years as Foreign Minister, Medelci was replaced by Ramtane Lamamra in the government named on 11 September 2013. President Bouteflika instead appointed Medelci as President of the Constitutional Council on 15 September 2013. Medelci replaced Tayeb Belaiz, who had been appointed to the government as Minister of the Interior.

== Death ==
Medelci was very unwell in January 2019, he was hospitalised in Paris before being brought back to Algiers in the last week of January. By 27 January, he was incapable of carrying out his role of president of the Constitutional Council just as it was preparing to oversee the 2019 Algerian presidential election. Medelci died at approximately 1:30am on 28 January in Algiers. He was buried the same day in Ben Aknoun cemetery. The constitutional council, led by the vice-president will meet to discuss the situation.

== See also ==
- Cabinet of Algeria
