= 15th BRICS summit =

2023 international summit in Johannesburg, South Africa

2023 BRICS summit 15th BRICS summit
- 22–24 August 2023

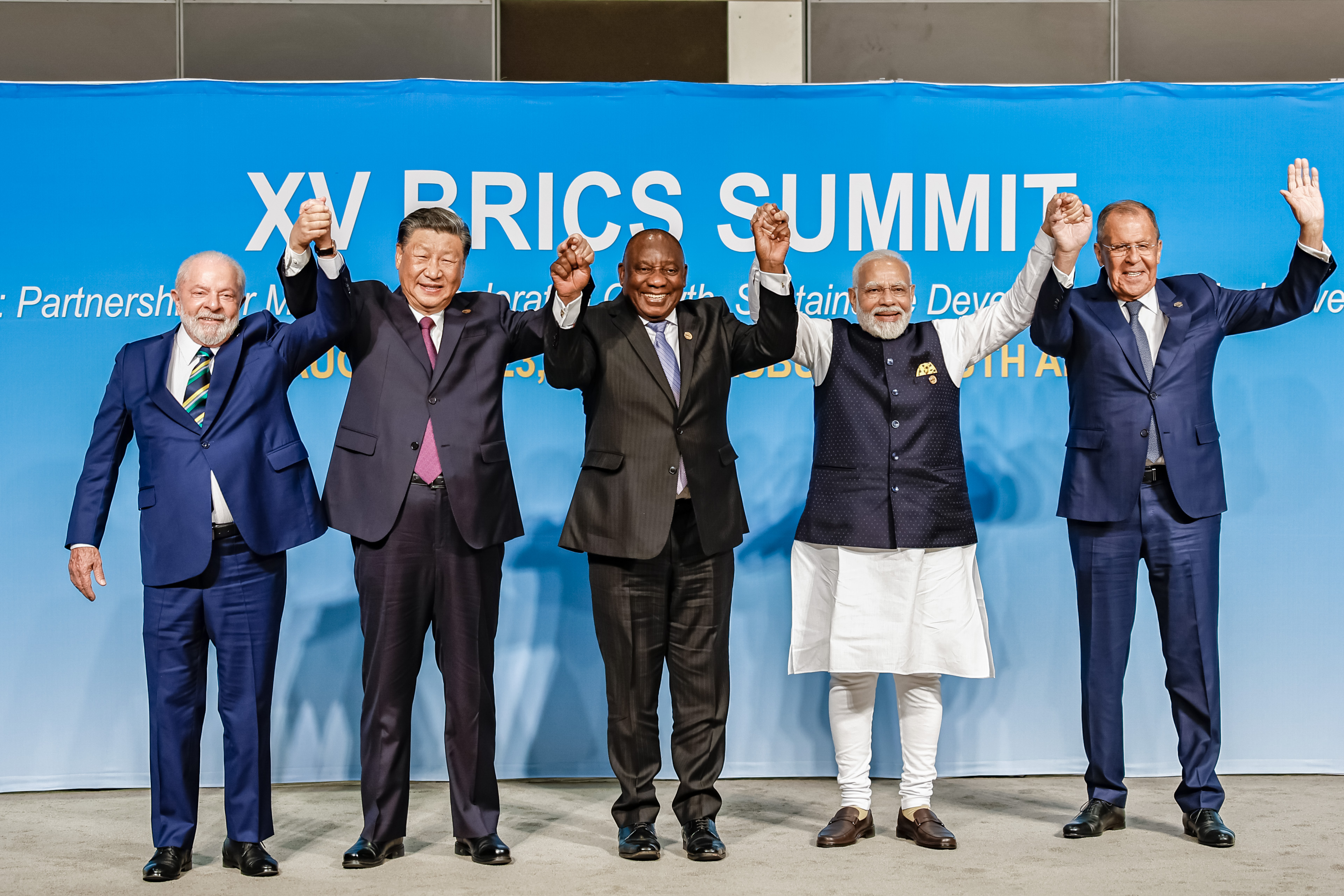
- Host country: South Africa
- Cities: Johannesburg
- Venues: Sandton Convention Centre
- Participants: Brazil; Russia; India; China; South Africa; Invited bodies: African Union; Arab Maghreb Union; Organisation of Islamic Cooperation; United Nations; ASEAN
- Chair: Cyril Ramaphosa, President of South Africa
- Website: www.brics2023.gov.za

The 2023 BRICS summit was the fifteenth annual BRICS summit, an international relations conference attended by the heads of state or heads of government of the five member states: Brazil, Russia, India, China, and South Africa. South African President Cyril Ramaphosa also invited the leaders of 67 countries to the summit.

== Summit events ==
=== BRICS expansion ===
Several countries have expressed interest in joining the BRICS group. At the summit, South African President Cyril Ramaphosa announced that Argentina, Egypt, Ethiopia, Iran, Saudi Arabia, and the United Arab Emirates have been invited to join the bloc. Full membership took effect on 1 January 2024.

== Participating leaders ==
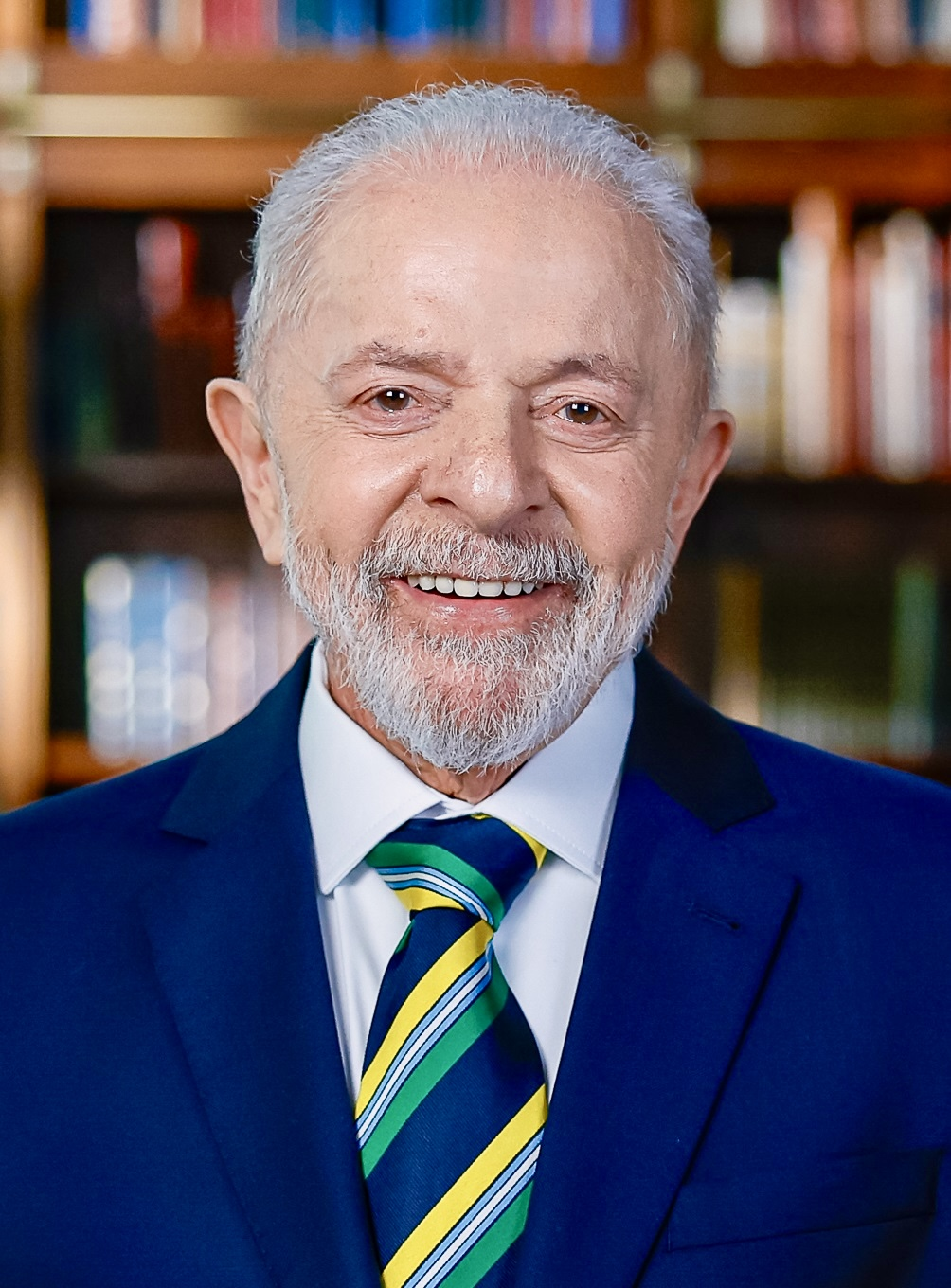
Brazil
Luiz Inácio Lula da Silva, President

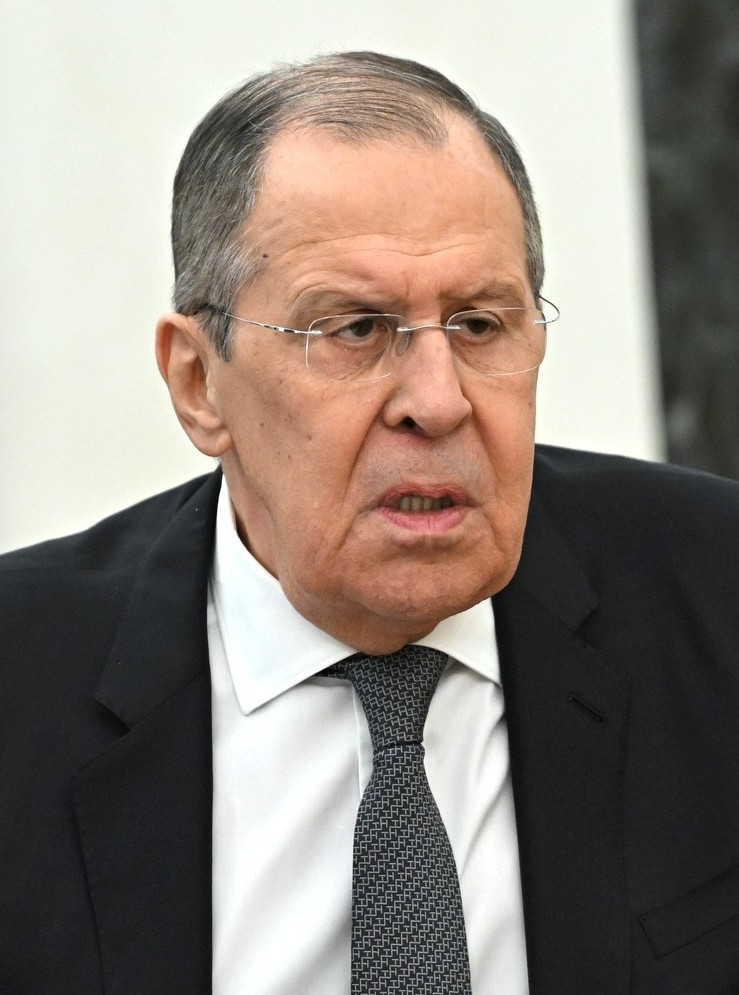
Russia
Sergei Lavrov, Foreign Minister

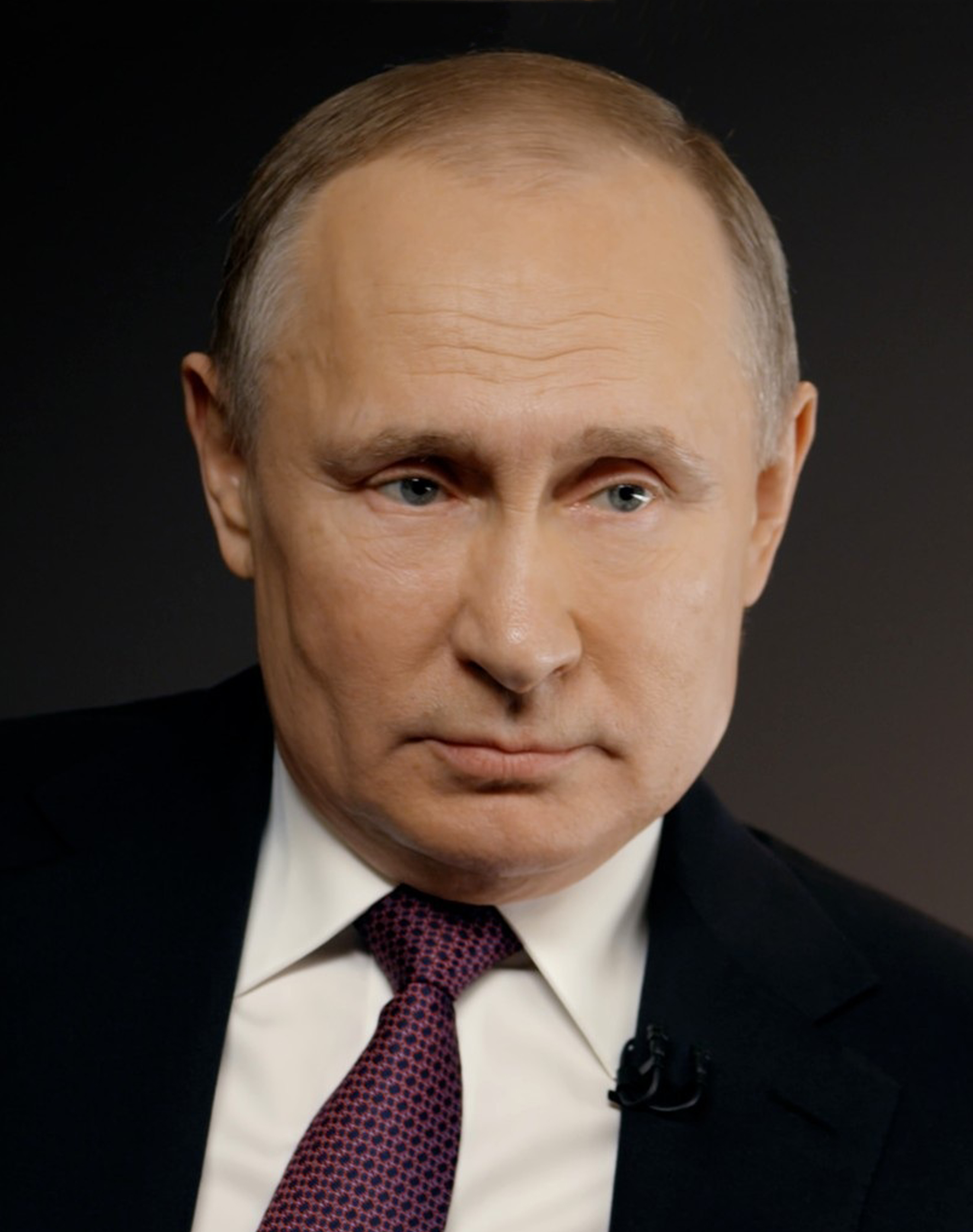
Russia
Vladimir Putin, President (participating virtually)

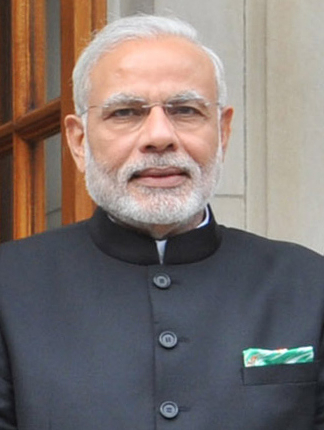
India
Narendra Modi, Prime Minister

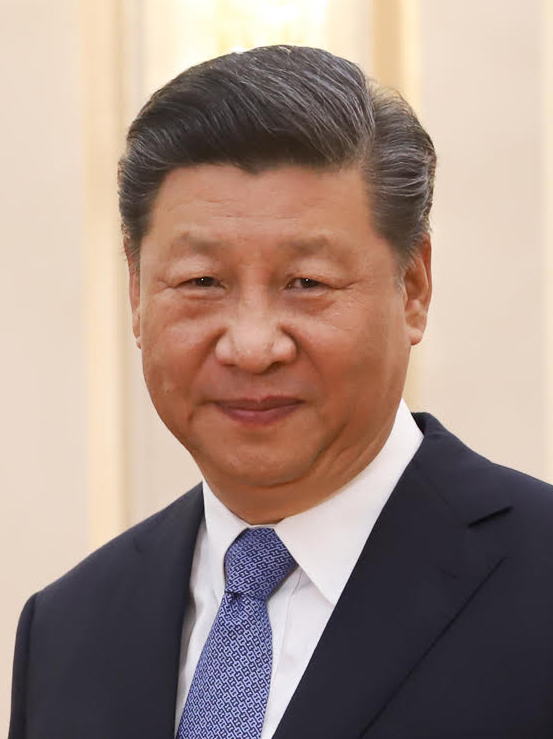
China
Xi Jinping, CCP General Secretary and President (Note: The head of government of China is the Premier, while the President is legally a ceremonial office and has no real power in China's political system. However, the General Secretary of the Chinese Communist Party (top position) has always held this office since 1993 except for the months of transition, and the current paramount leader is Xi Jinping.)

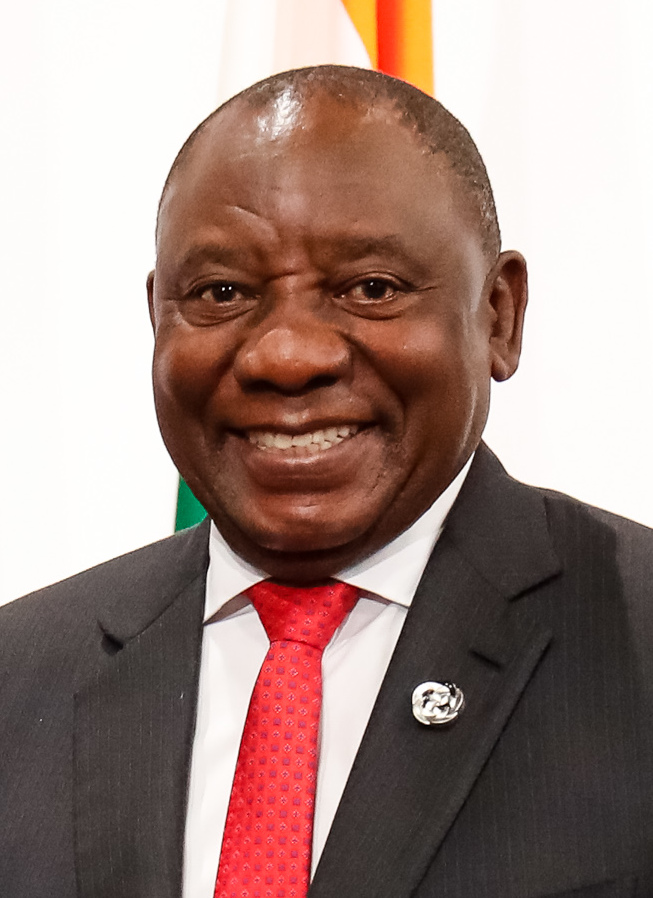
South Africa
Cyril Ramaphosa, President (Host)

=== Other attendees ===
Country	Position	Officeholder	Source
Algeria	Finance Minister	Laaziz Fayed	
Angola	State Minister of Economic Coordenation	José de Lima Massano	
Bangladesh	Prime Minister	Sheikh Hasina	
Belarus	Foreign Minister	Sergei Aleinik	
Bolivia	President	Luis Arce	
Botswana	Vice President	Slumber Tsogwane	
Burundi	President	Evariste Ndayishimiye	
Cameroon	Prime Minister	Joseph Ngute	
Central African Republic	President	Faustin-Archange Touadera	
China	Commerce Minister	Wang Wentao	
Congo	President	Denis Sassou Nguesso	
Cuba	First Secretary; President	Miguel Díaz-Canel	
DR Congo	Prime Minister	Jean-Michel Sama Lukonde	
Egypt	Prime Minister	Mostafa Madbouly	
Ethiopia	Prime Minister	Abiy Ahmed	
Equatorial Guinea	President	Teodoro Obiang Nguema Mbasogo	
Eritrea	President	Isaias Afwerki	
Ghana	President	Nana Akufo-Addo	
Indonesia	President	Joko Widodo	
Iran	President	Ebrahim Raisi	
Libya	Vice President	Musa Al-Koni	
Malawi	President	Lazarus Chakwera	
Mozambique	President	Filipe Nyusi	
Namibia	President	Hage Geingob	
Nigeria	Vice President	Kashim Shettima	
Palestine	Deputy Prime Minister	Ziad Abu Amr	
Sahrawi Arab Democratic Republic	President	Brahim Ghali	
São Tomé and Príncipe	President	Carlos Vila Nova	
Saudi Arabia	Foreign Minister	Faisal bin Farhan Al Saud	
Senegal	President	Macky Sall	
South Sudan	President	Salva Kiir	
Tanzania	President	Samia Suluhu Hassan	
Uganda	Vice President	Jessica Alupo	
United Arab Emirates	President	Mohamed bin Zayed Al Nahyan	
Zambia	President	Hakainde Hichilema	
Zimbabwe	Vice President	Constantino Chiwenga	

== Controversies ==
=== Participation of Vladimir Putin ===
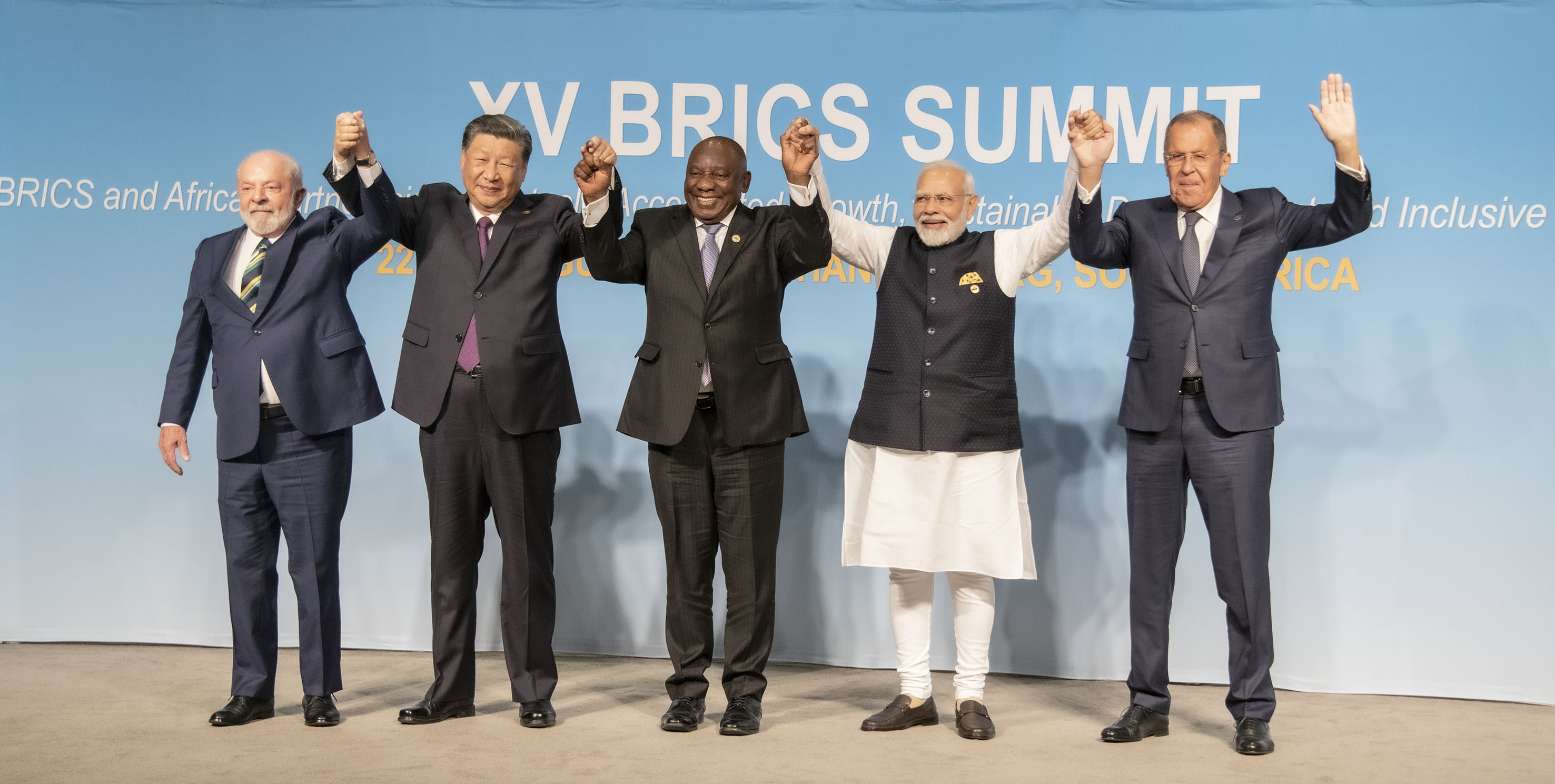
The BRICS leaders and Sergei Lavrov

In March 2023, the International Criminal Court (ICC) issued an arrest warrant against Russian President Vladimir Putin for war crimes during the Russian invasion of Ukraine. South Africa is required as an ICC signatory to honour the warrant.

In May 2023, the South African government, led by the African National Congress (ANC), granted all invited leaders diplomatic immunity. It remained unclear at the time whether this would prevent Putin from being arrested if he attended. According to the Department of International Relations and Cooperation, it was standard practice in South Africa to confer such immunity to attendees of international conferences held in the country.

By early June 2023, moving the summit to China was being considered to avoid the issue. In mid-July 2023, Vladimir Putin announced that he would not attend the summit "by mutual agreement" and would instead be sending Foreign Minister Sergei Lavrov.

=== Narendra Modi's refusal to disembark plane ===
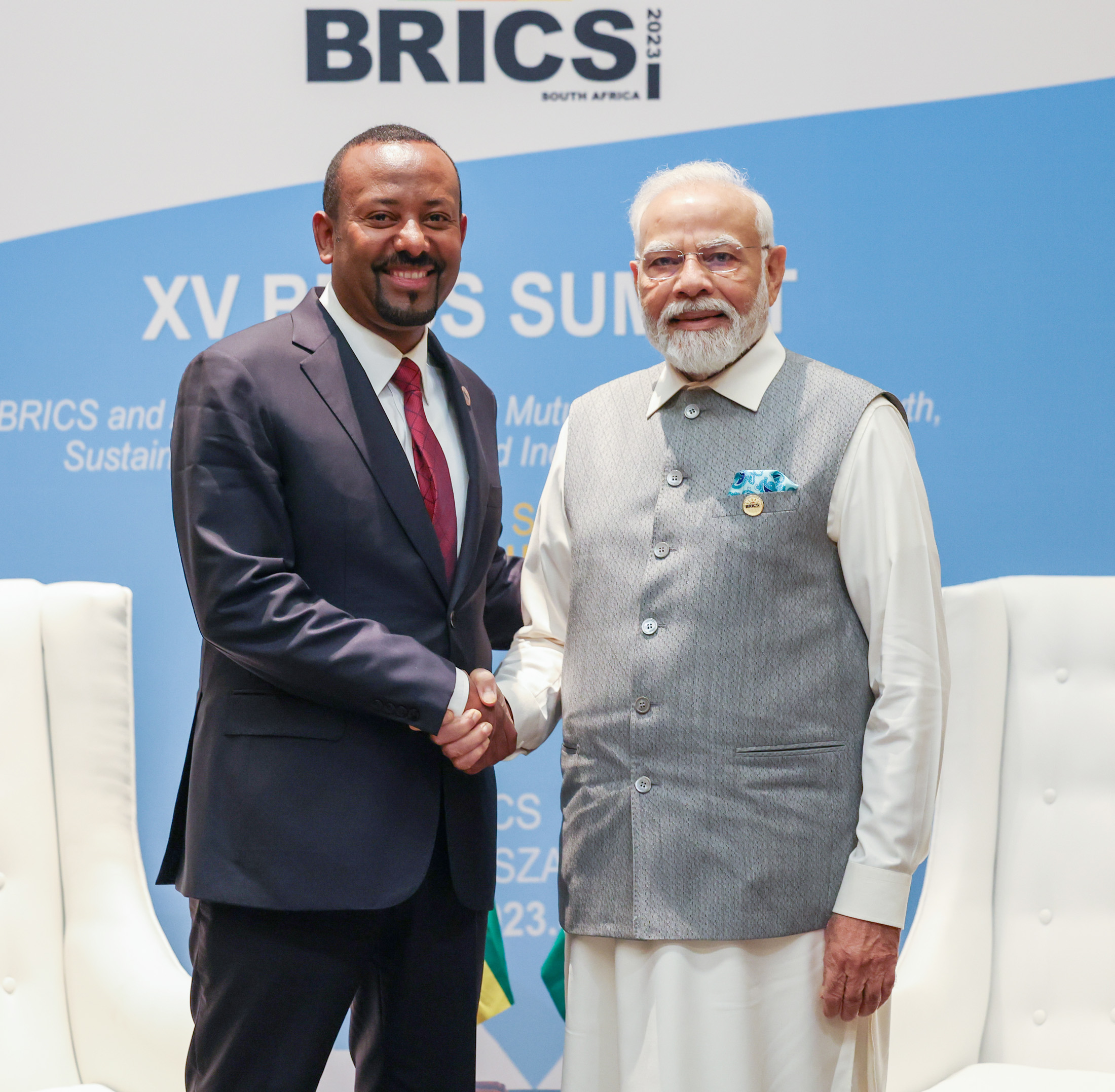
Ethiopian Prime Minister Ahmed with Indian counterpart Prime Minister Narendra Modi meeting for Ethiopia's admission to the alliance

On 22 August 2023, Daily Maverick reported that India's Prime Minister Narendra Modi refused to get off his plane until the deputy president of South Africa was dispatched to welcome him instead of the government cabinet minister that was present to conduct the airport welcome. The South African government denied that Modi had refused to disembark his plane, saying that Ramaphosa was unable to meet Modi at the airport due to scheduling difficulties, and adding that it was common for government ministers to welcome visiting heads of state.

Following the publication of the story, the Daily Maverick experienced a sustained DDOS attack from India, which forced it to temporarily block access to the site from the country. The editor-in-chief of the Daily Maverick speculated that the reason for the DDOS attack was to prevent people in India from reading the article.

=== Nonattendance by Xi Jinping ===
Despite meeting with host Cyril Ramaphosa earlier in the day and attending the BRICS dinner afterward, Chinese leader Xi Jinping unexpectedly did not attend the BRICS business forum where he had been scheduled to speak and instead his speech was read out by Minister of Commerce of China Wang Wentao.
