= Jean Baptiste Paulin Trolard =

French anatomist (1842–1910)

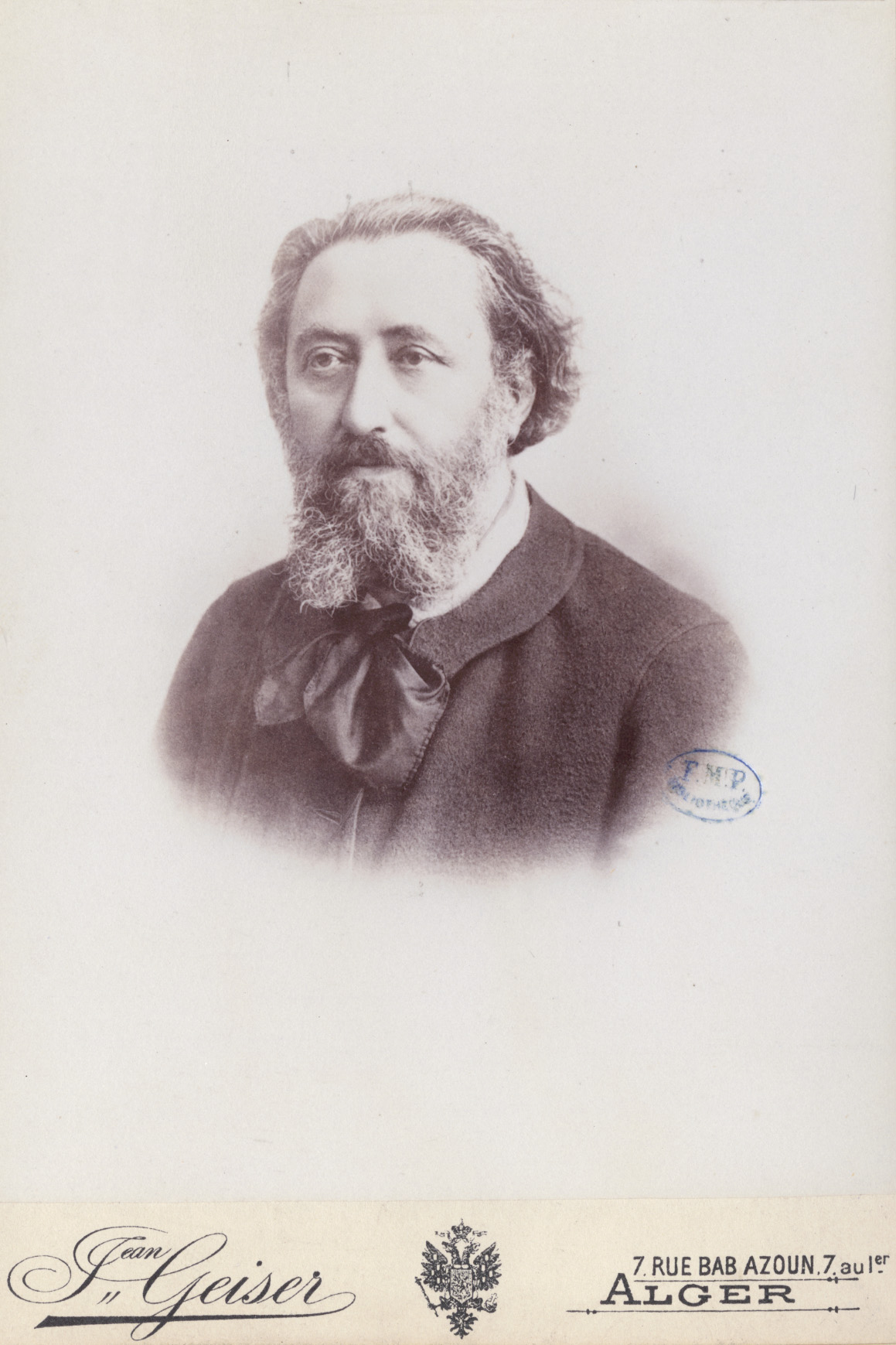
- Born: Jean Baptiste Paulin Trolard; 27 November 1842; Sedan, Ardennes
- Died: 13 April 1910 (aged 67); Algiers
- Education: Algiers 1 University
- Occupation: Anatomist

Jean Baptiste Paulin Trolard (27 November 1842 – 13 April 1910) was a French anatomist from Sedan, Ardennes, known for his work on the anastomotic veins of the cerebral circulation. The "vein of Trolard" (the superior anastomotic vein) was named after him.

He studied medicine at the Algiers Preparatory College of Medicine, afterwards working as a municipal physician in Saint Eugène, a suburb of Algiers. In 1861, he began work as an anatomy prosector at the college. From 1869 to 1910, he was a professor of anatomy at the Mustapha Pacha hospital Algiers.

Known for his work against contagious diseases and epidemics, he was a proponent of free vaccinations for all indigent peoples. In 1882, he founded La Ligue de Reboisement in an effort to promote reforestation and prevent the deforestation of Algeria for the sake of creating pastureland. With Henri Soulié, he was co-founder of the Pasteur Institute of Algeria in 1894.

== Bibliography ==
- Loukas, Marios; Shea Misha; Shea Cory; Lutter-Hoppenheim Martine; Zand Paula; Tubbs R Shane; Cohen-Gadol Aaron A (Jun 2010). "Jean Baptiste Paulin Trolard (1842–1910): his life and contributions to neuroanatomy". J. Neurosurg. 112 (6). United States: 1192–6. doi:10.3171/2009.8.JNS09818. PMID 19780648.
- Le Minor, Jean-Marie (2005). "The anatomists in Algiers during the French colonial period (1830-1962)". Hist Sci Med (in French). 39 (4). France: 385–96. ISSN 0440-8888. PMID 17162936.
