= Badra Ben Mustapha =

Tunisian midwife and activist (1912–1993)

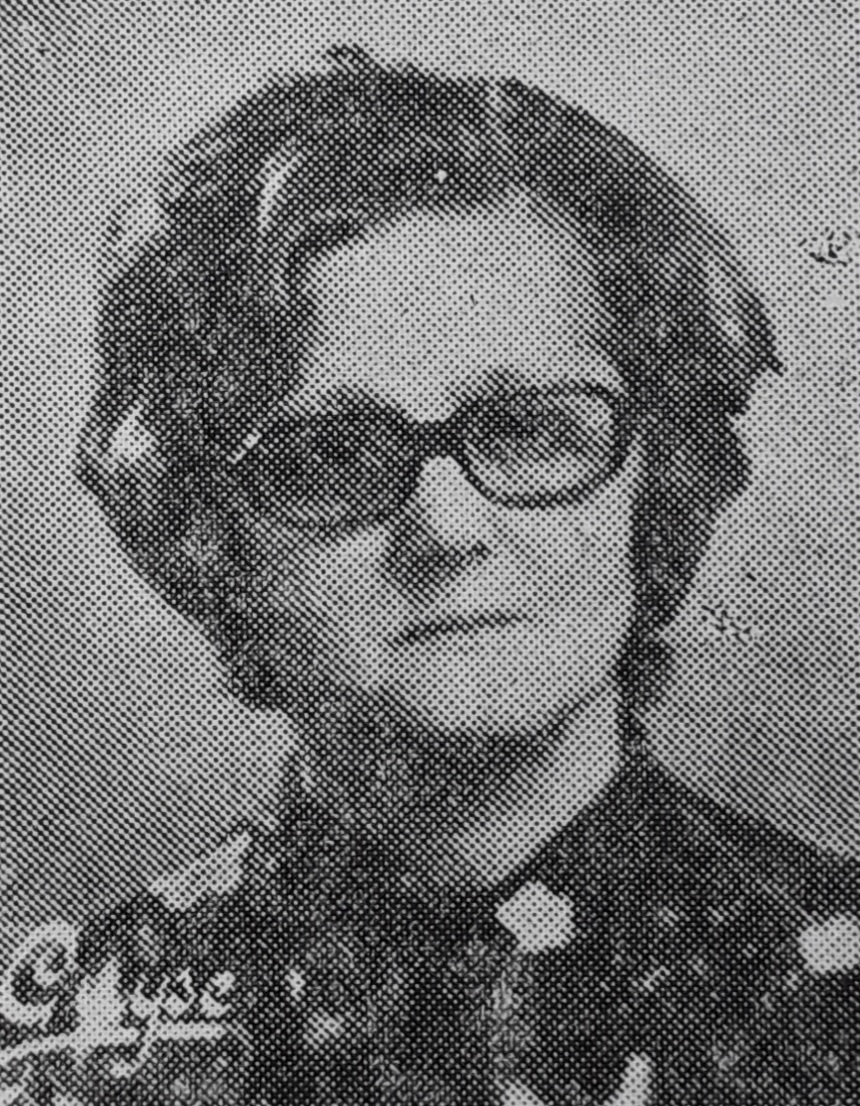
- Born: 12 March 1912; French protectorate of Tunisia
- Died: 6 June 1993 (aged 81); Tunisia
- Education: University of Algiers 1, Faculté de médecine d’Alger
- Occupations: Midwife, activist
- Employer: Hôpital Aziza Othmana
- Honours: Ordre de l'Indépendance (Tunisie)

Badra Ben Mustafa (Arabic: بدرة بن مصطفى, romanized: Badrah ibn Muṣṭafá; 12 March 1912 – 6 August 1993) was the first woman to graduate from the Faculty of Medicine at the University of Algiers. She worked as a midwife, advocated for women's rights, and was a member of the Tunisian Union of Muslim Women, which was later renamed the Tunisian Women's Union.

== Life and education ==
In 1932, Badra Ben Mustapha completed her Medicine at the University of Algiers, specializing in obstetrics. She was the first Tunisian woman to graduate from this medical faculty and only the second Tunisian woman ever to study medicine.

Following her graduation, she worked for the social services department of the city of Tunis. In 1935, together with four physicians (including Ahmed Ben Mayled) and a dentist, she founded the first Tunisian hospital, Dar Ibn Al-Jazzar, in the Halfaouine district. The hospital remained in operation until the period following the World War II. She was promoted to the position of senior physician.

In 1936, she joined the Union of Tunisian Muslim Women, founded by Bashira Ben Mourad. Later, she became a member of the Union of Tunisian Women which was closely linked to the Tunisian Communist Party and represented this organization at a symposium on family planning in Belgrade in November 1969.

== Honors ==
In 1989, she was named of the Ordre de l'Indépendance (Tunisie), alongside other women, including Bchira Ben Mrad. On the occasion of International Women’s Day, the city of Ariana (Tunisia) honored her as one of Tunisia’s ten pioneers by naming a street after her.
