= Ahmed Djoghlaf =

Algerian diplomat (born 1953)

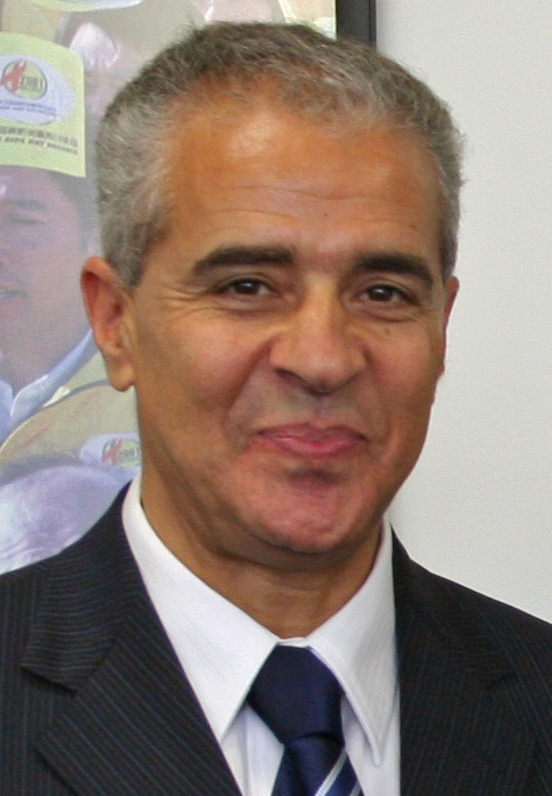
Ahmed Djoghlaf in 2009

Ahmed Djoghlaf (born 25 November 1953 in Algiers), was the executive secretary of the Convention on Biological Diversity under the United Nations Environment Programme (UNEP) until 2012.

As Executive Secretary of the Convention, he had a key role in the field of sustainable development and protection of global biodiversity.

He was formerly the Assistant Executive Director of UNEP and Director of the Division of the Global Environment Facility Coordination. He studied at, among others, the Nancy-Université, France (PhD in political sciences), St. John's University, New York (Master of Arts, Government and Politics), Université Lille Nord de France (Master of Political Sciences and Information Sciences) and the University of Algiers (Law degree).

He is a Councillor of the World Future Council.
