= Ahmed Bidani =

Algerian politician

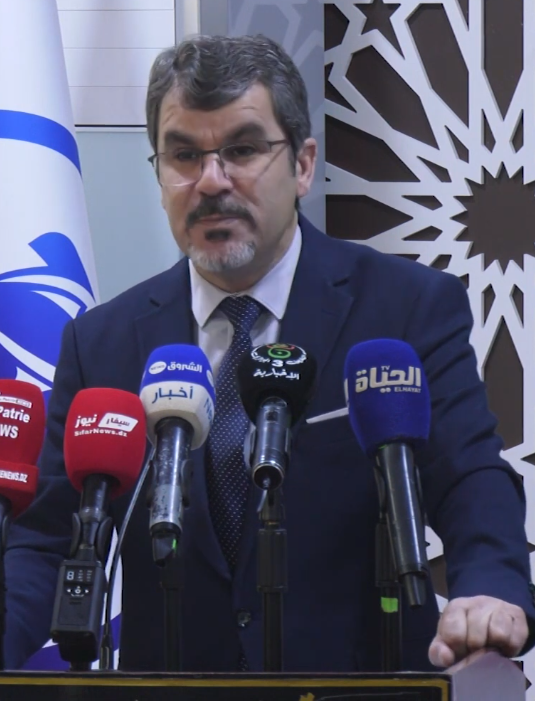
- Bidani in 2024

Minister of Fishing and Fishery Productions
- In office 16 March 2023 – 19 november 2024
- President: Abdelmadjid Tebboune
- Prime Minister: Aymen Benabderrahmane; Nadir Larbaoui
- Preceded by: Hichem Sofiane Salaouatchi
- Succeeded by: Youcef Cherfa (Fishing)

Personal details
- Born: April 24, 1972 (age 54)
- Education: National Higher School of Statistics and Applied Economics (Dr)

Ahmed Bidani (born 24 April 1972) is the Algerian Minister of Fishing and Fishery Productions. He was appointed as minister on 16 March 2023.

== Education ==
Bidani holds a Doctorate in Statistics from the National Higher School of Statistics and Applied Economics.

== Career ==
From 2001 until 2017, Bidani was a state engineer at the Ministry of Fishing and Fishery Productions. In 2008, he was appointed head of the Statistics and IT Office at the ministry.

Between 2008 and 2017, Bidani served as the Deputy Director of Statistics and Prospective Studies at the Ministry of Fishing and Fishery Production.

From 2017 until 2019, he was the Deputy Director of Information Systems of Aquaculture at the Ministry of Agriculture, Rural Development and Fisheries.

In 2019, he was appointed as Director of Statistical Information Systems and Forecasting at the Ministry of Agriculture and Rural Development.

Since 16 March 2023, Bidani has served as Minister of Fishing and Fishery Productions.
