= Kamel Rezig =

Algerian politician

- كمال رزيق
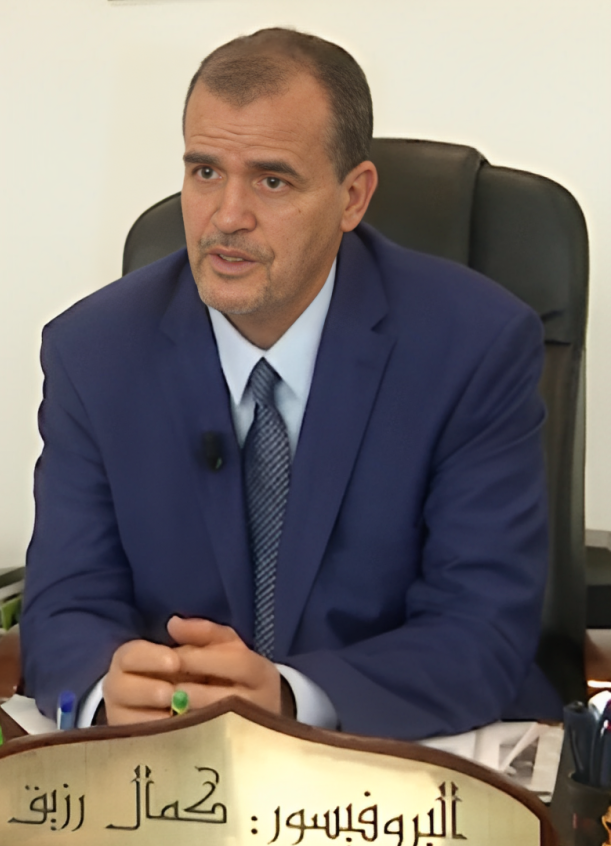
- Rezig in 2020

Minister of Trade and Export Promotion
- Incumbent
- Assumed office 14 September 2025
- President: Abdelmadjid Tebboune
- Prime Minister: Nadir Larbaoui; Sifi Ghrieb
- Preceded by: Mohamed Boukhari
- In office 2 January 2020 – 16 March 2023
- President: Abdelmadjid Tebboune
- Prime Minister: Aymen Benabderrahmane
- Preceded by: Saïd Djellab
- Succeeded by: Tayeb Zitouni

Personal details
- Born: October 18, 1964 (age 61) Boufarik
- Education: Algiers 3 University (MSc); Algiers 3 University (DSc)

Kamel Rezig (Arabic: كمال رزيق; born 18 October 1964) is an Algerian politician serving as Minister of Trade and Export Promotion since 2025. He previously held the same position from 2020 to 2023.

== Education ==
Rezig holds a Graduate Diploma in Finance (1993) from the l’Institut National des Finances in Koléa, a Master in Economics (1996) and a Doctorate in Economics (2001) from the Algiers 3 University.
