= Fadéla M'rabet =

Algerian writer (1935–2025)

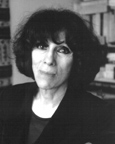
- Born: 12 April 1935; Skikda, French Algeria
- Died: 14 May 2025 (aged 90)
- Occupations: Writer; Doctor of Biology; teacher; feminist

Fadéla M'rabet (12 April 1935 – 14 May 2025) was an Algerian writer, teacher and feminist.

== Life and career ==
M'rabet was born in Skikda on 12 April 1935, and grew up in Constantine, Algeria. Her family was religious Islamic, and her father worked in the Algerian state radio station. M'rabet attended the University of Algiers where she got her degree and later attended university in Strasbourg where she completed a doctorate in biology. After university M'rabet worked as a teacher before joining the radio station with her father where she ran a women's program. Her work there inspired her first books La Femme algérienne and Les algériennes. She became known as a leading feminist in Algeria. As a result, she was dismissed from her job and moved to France where she has worked as a lecturer. On 14 May 2025, she died at the age of 90.

== Bibliography ==
- La Femme algérienne, 1965
- Les algériennes, 1967
- L'Algérie des illusions, 1973
- Une femme d'ici et d'ailleurs, 2005
- Une enfance singulière : récit, 2009
- Le muezzin aux yeux bleus, 2013
- Une poussière d'étoiles, 2014
- Le bonheur d'être Algérien, 2019
