= Saddek Rabah =

- Born: July 1, 1966 (age 60); Bir el Ater, Algeria
- Education: University Of Algiers (BA); Paris II (MA) and (PhD)
- Children: 3
- Scientific career
- Fields: Media studies; Mass communication
- Workplaces: Ajman University; United Arab Emirates University; University of Sharjah; Emirates Canadian University College; Emirates College of Technology; Qatar University
- Thesis: La problématique de l'autre : le discours médiatique sur l'islam transplanté en France : le cas de l'Express et du Nouvel Observateur (1997)
- Doctoral advisor: Francis Balle

Saddek Rabah (born 1968) is an Algerian researcher, professor and author in the field of information science and communication. He has been teaching higher education since the year 2000.

== Biography ==
Graduate of ISIC (Institute of Information and Communication Science, University of Algiers) and Panthéon-Assas University, Rabah is a researcher in information science and communication. He is currently working on modern forms of media and social networking in the Arab world and worldwide.

== Publications ==
=== Books ===
- Saddek, R. (2013). Digital Studies: Concepts, Approaches and Stakes. Beirut: Dara Annahada Al Arabia.
- Saddek, R. (2004). Media & New Technologies. Al Ain (UAE): University Book House.
- Saddek, R. & Alayadi, N. (2005). History of Theories of Mass Communication (translated from French). Beirut (Lebanon), third edition: Arab Organization for Translation. Arab Association for Translation.
- Saddek, R. & Alayadi, N. (2004). Introduction to Multimedia (translated from French). Al Ain (UAE): University Book House.
- Saddek, R. (1998). The French Media Discourse on Islam Transplanted to France (in French). Paris (France): Dar El Bourak.
- Saddek, R. (1998). The Western Imaginary and Islam. Sources of Discourse, (in French). Paris (France): Dar El Bourak.

=== Book chapters ===
Book chapters:

- Saddek, R. (2021). Media and Communication Studies and the Question of Identity. In Hamdi, M. and al., (eds.), Introduction to Communication and Media Studies (pp. 63–94). Amman: Zamzam Publishing House.
- Saddek, R. (2020). The Concept of Discourse. From Text to Context. In Alabdallah, M. and al., (eds.), The Concept in Communication and Media Studies (pp. 8–55). Beirut: Dara Annahdha Al Arabia.
- Saddek, R. (2019). "Citizen Media":Concept and Approaches. In Foudil Deliou (eds.), Studies in Electronic Media (pp. 27–80). Amman:Academic Book Center.
- Saddek, R. (2012). Wikileaks & Newspapers: celebration and skepticism". In Arab Center for Research & Policy Studies (eds.), The Dialectic of Media and Politics between Virtual and the Real: The Case of Wikileaks (pp. 231–281). Doha (Qatar): Arab Center for Research & Policy Studies.
- Saddek, R. (2010). Childhood, Media & Networked Society: Interaction vs. Adversity. In Azzi, A. R. & Elmeshmeshy M. M. (Ed.), Satellite Television and Cultural Identity in the Arab World (pp. 293–319). Sharjah (UAE): College of Graduate Studies & Research.
- Saddek, R. (2010). Islamophobia in French Media Discourse. In Philadelphia University (eds.), Culture of love and Hate (pp. 291–314). Amman (Jordan): Philadelphia University Publications.
- Saddek, R. (2008). French Media and the Image of Islam. In Islamic Educational, Scientific & Cultural Organization (Ed.), Media and Islamophobia. Rabat (Morocco): Islamic Educational, Scientific & Cultural Organization Publications.
- Saddek, R. (2005). Some Questions about Media Studies. In Philadelphia University (eds.), Insights into the Future (pp. 539–562). Amman (Jordan): Philadelphia University Publications.
- Saddek, R. (2002). The Future of the Printed Press in the Era of the Internet. In Saud Saleh, K. (Ed.), Traditional & New Mass Media. "Is the printed Press going to disappear?" (pp. 242–304). Jedda (Saudi Arabia): Sharikat Almadina Elmounawar Litibaa wa Nashr.

=== Articles ===
- Saddek, R., (2021). Media Governance : an Epistemogical approach of the Concept. Communication & Development, 30, 105-131.
- Saddek, R., (2020). Rationalizing Youth’s Ethical practices in Digital Spaces. Lubab for Strategic and Media Studies, 8, 235-273.
- Saddek, R. & Amor B. A., (2019). Relations 2.0, Strategies of Friendship Management on Facebook in Tunisia. Journal of Communication. Media Watch, 10(2), 404-418. DOI: 10.15655/mw/v10i2/49630
- Saddek, R., (2019). Media and Communication Studies: A Critical Approach. International Journal of Social Communication, 6(2), 8-34.
- Saddek, R. (2017). "The Role of Critical Thinking in Dealing Rationally with Rumors on Social Networks". Arabian Journal of Media and Communication, 17, 99–124.
- Saddek, R. (2015). Networked Environment and Media Convergence and their Effects on Media Profession. Alim ElFikr Journal, 44(2), 153-184.
- Saddek, R. (2014). Online Newspapers and the Web 2.0 Era. Journal of Media Researcher, 23, 28-50.
- Saddek, R. (2013). The Perception of Islam & Arabs in French Textbooks. Journal of Public Relations/Middle East, 3, 15-28.
- Saddek, R. (2013). Economics of Online Media. The Arab Radio Journal, 3, 82-89.
- Saddek, R. (2013). Social Networks and Crisis Management: Some Practical Examples and Prospective Visions. Journal of Communication & Media Studies, 15, 10-35
- Saddek, R. (2013). "Social Networking Platforms: A Virtual Public Space in the Arab World?"Global Media Journal, 2 (1–2), 47–62.
- Saddek, R. (2012). Youth digital identity: Social and Self Representations. Idafat (the Arab Journal of Sociology), 19, 89-115.
- Saddek, R. (2012). New Technologies and the Future of Radio. The Arab Radio Journal, 4, 27-33.
- Saddek, R. (2011). Public Service Broadcasting Concept: Commercial versus Critical Approach. The Arab Radios Journal, 2, 16-27.
- Saddek, R. (2010). "Citizen Media": Concept & Approaches. Arab Journal for information and Communication Studies, 6, 223-276.
- Saddek, R. (2010). Journalistic Blogs and Institutional Media: an exploratory Study of Differences and Similarities. Arab Journal for the Humanities. 28(112), 57-93.
- Saddek, R. (2010). Reflections on Cultural and Social Stakes of the Networked Technologies. Communication & Development, 1, 5-12.
- Saddek, R. (2009). Cost of "Happiness": Advertising & Body's Fetishization. Alim ElKikr, 37(4), 169-207.
- Saddek, R. (2008). The blogosphere: Emergence of a New Medium or New Collective Illusions? Dirasat/Human & Social Sciences, 35(3), 579-600.
- Saddek, R. (2008). New Information and Communications Technologies & the Question of Social Bonds. Journal of Social Affairs, 25(99), 9-34.
- Saddek, R. (2008). Audiovisual field: the academic exigencies and the professional constraints. The Arab Radios Journal, 4, 57-62.
- Saddek, R. (2007). The Integration of ICT in the Press Institutions. Revue tunisienne de communication (a Scholarly Referred Journal specialized in Mass Media Studies), 47/48, 71-95.
- Saddek, R. (2007). Information Society: Searching for a Cognitive Efficiency of the Concept. Alim ElKikr, 36(1), 7-35.
- Saddek, R. (2006). Some Considerations about the sociocultural Stakes of the Digital Technologies. The Arab Radios Journal, 1, 84-94.
- Saddek, Rabah (1999). Mass Media & the Phenomenon of Globalization. Al Moustaqbal Al Arabi, 243, 88-109.
- Saddek, R. (1999). Islam in French Orientalist Writings (in French). Al Mounataf, 14, 29-45.
- Saddek, R. (1998). Islam in France: The Identity's Problem. Al Moustaqbal Al Arabi, 233, 23-47.
- Saddek, R. (1996). The Moslem's Image in Middle Age Writings. (in French). Etudes Orientales, 17/18, 4-22.
