= Mohammed Seddik Benyahia =

Algerian politician (1932–1982)

Mohamed Seddik Benyahia
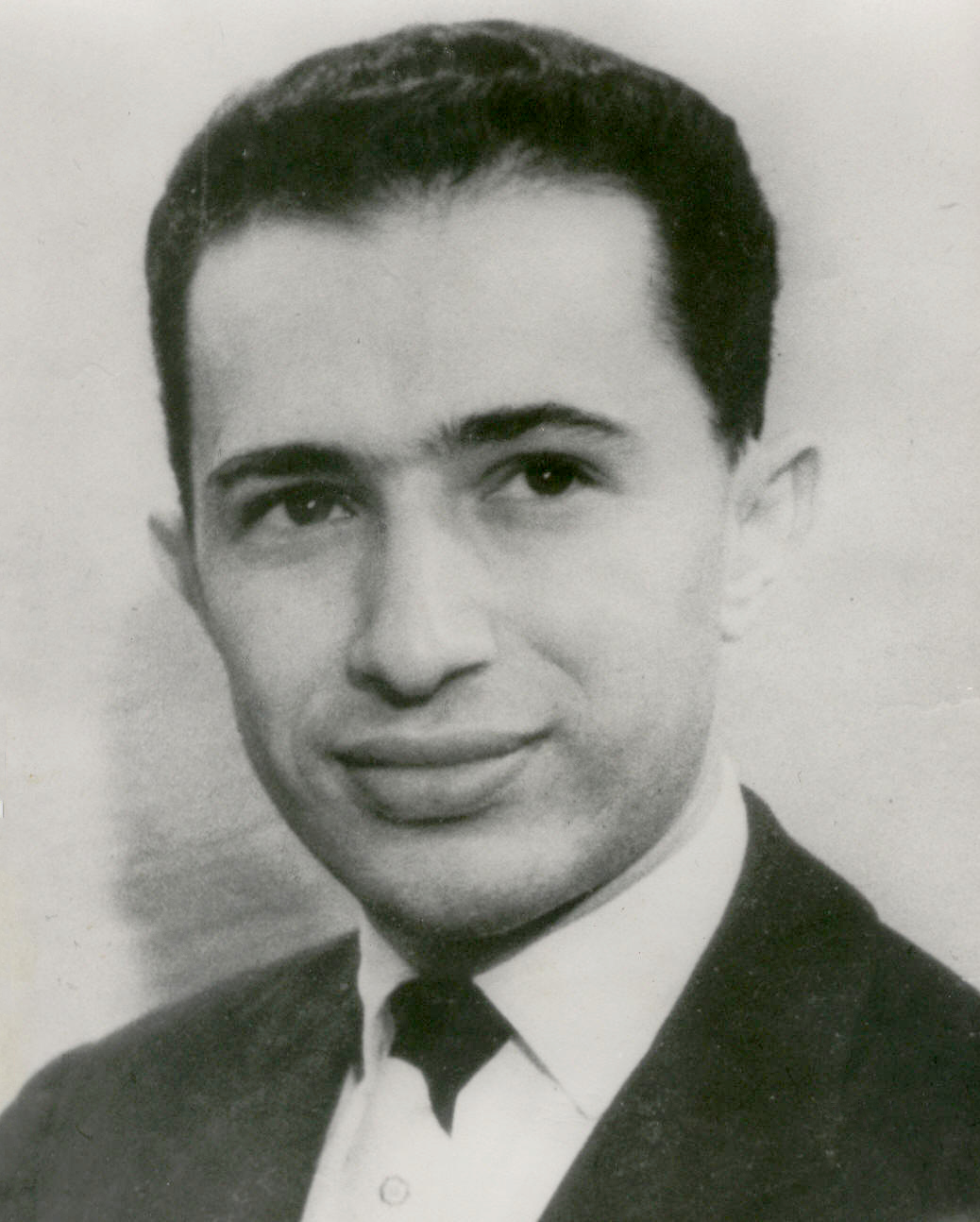
- Born: January 30, 1932; Jijel, Algeria
- Died: May 3, 1982 (aged 50); Gottour, Iran (Turkish -Iranian border)
- Occupations: Politician, Militant nationalist
- Political party: FLN
- Parent: Father's name: Ferhat

Mohammed Seddik Benyahia or Ben Yahia (Arabic: محمد الصديق بن يحيى; January 30, 1932 – May 3, 1982) was an Algerian politician and a militant nationalist during the war in Algeria. After independence he was Minister of Information (1967–1971), Higher Education (1971–1977), Finance (1977–1979), and Foreign Affairs (1979–1982).

== Early life ==
He was born on January 30, 1932, in Jijel. During the Algerian war, he took an active part in the struggle for independence of his country. He was secretary general of the presidency of the provisional government of the Republic of Algeria (GPRA) and a member of the Algerian delegation in negotiations with the French government in Evian in 1962. He was responsible for chairing the meeting of CNRA in Tripoli (Libya) in 1962. After the independence of his country, he held the post of ambassador to Moscow and London. He led the Algerian team that brokered the Algiers Accords.

== Ministries ==
- Minister of Information from 1967 to 1971, in which he organized the first Pan-African Festival in 1968.
- Minister of Higher Education and Scientific Research from 1971 to 1977.
- Minister of Finance from 1977 to 1979.
- Minister of Foreign Affairs from 1979 until his death.

== Death ==
On 3 May 1982, his plane was shot down on the Iran-Turkey border during his mediation mission in the Iran–Iraq War. Both Iran and Iraq denied responsibility.
