= Brahim Djamel Kassali =

Algerian politician

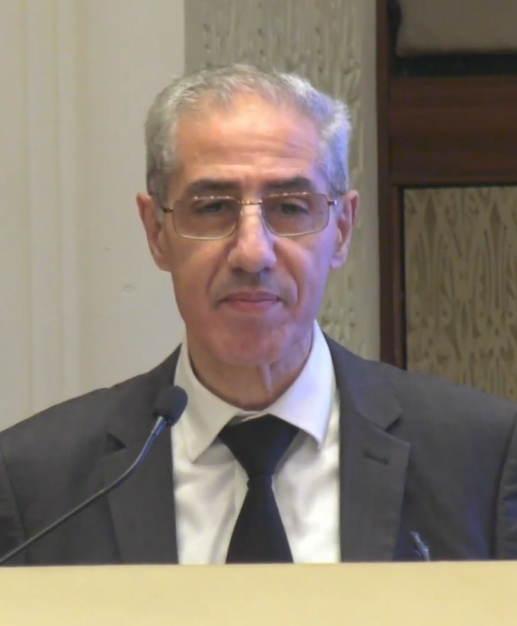
- Kassali in 2022

Minister of Finance
- In office 14 June 2022 – 16 March 2023
- President: Abdelmadjid Tebboune
- Prime Minister: Aymen Benabderrahmane
- Preceded by: Abderrahmane Raouya
- Succeeded by: Laaziz Fayed

Personal details
- Born: 11 November 1954 (age 71)
- Education: University of Algiers; Institut international d'administration publique

Brahim Djamel Kassali (Arabic: إبراهيم جمال كسالي; born 11 November 1954) was the Algerian Minister of Finance from 14 June 2022 to 16 March 2023.

== Education ==
Kassali has a degree in financial sciences (1977) from the University of Algiers, a Diploma in Privatization and Modernization of the Public Sector in the Market Economy (1994) from the Institut international d'administration publique in Paris and a Diploma in Capital Markets Organization (1995) from the Institute of International Financial Services in Montreal.

== Career ==
From 1980 until 1983, Kassali worked as the Senior Treasury Inspector at the Ministry of Finance.

In 1984, he was appointed head of the Banking Regulation Office and in 1987, Deputy Director of Credit at the Ministry of Economy. He was the Deputy Director of Budgetary Operations at the Ministry of Economy from 1990 until 1991.

Between 1995 and 2003, Kassali worked as the Director of Loans and Commitments of the State at the Ministry of Finance. In 2003, he was appointed the acting Director General of the Treasury at the Ministry of Finance.

From 2005 until 2020, Kassali was the CEO of the Algerian Insurance and Reinsurance Company (CAAR). In addition, he was the president of the Algerian Union of Insurance and Reinsurance Companies (UAR) for several years.

In May 2020, he was appointed Secretary General of the Ministry of Finance.

Since July 2022, Kassali has been the Minister of Finances.
