= University of Algiers 2 =

Public university in Bouzareahm, Algeria

Coordinates: 36°46′32.6″N 3°0′14″E

- جامعة الجزائر 2
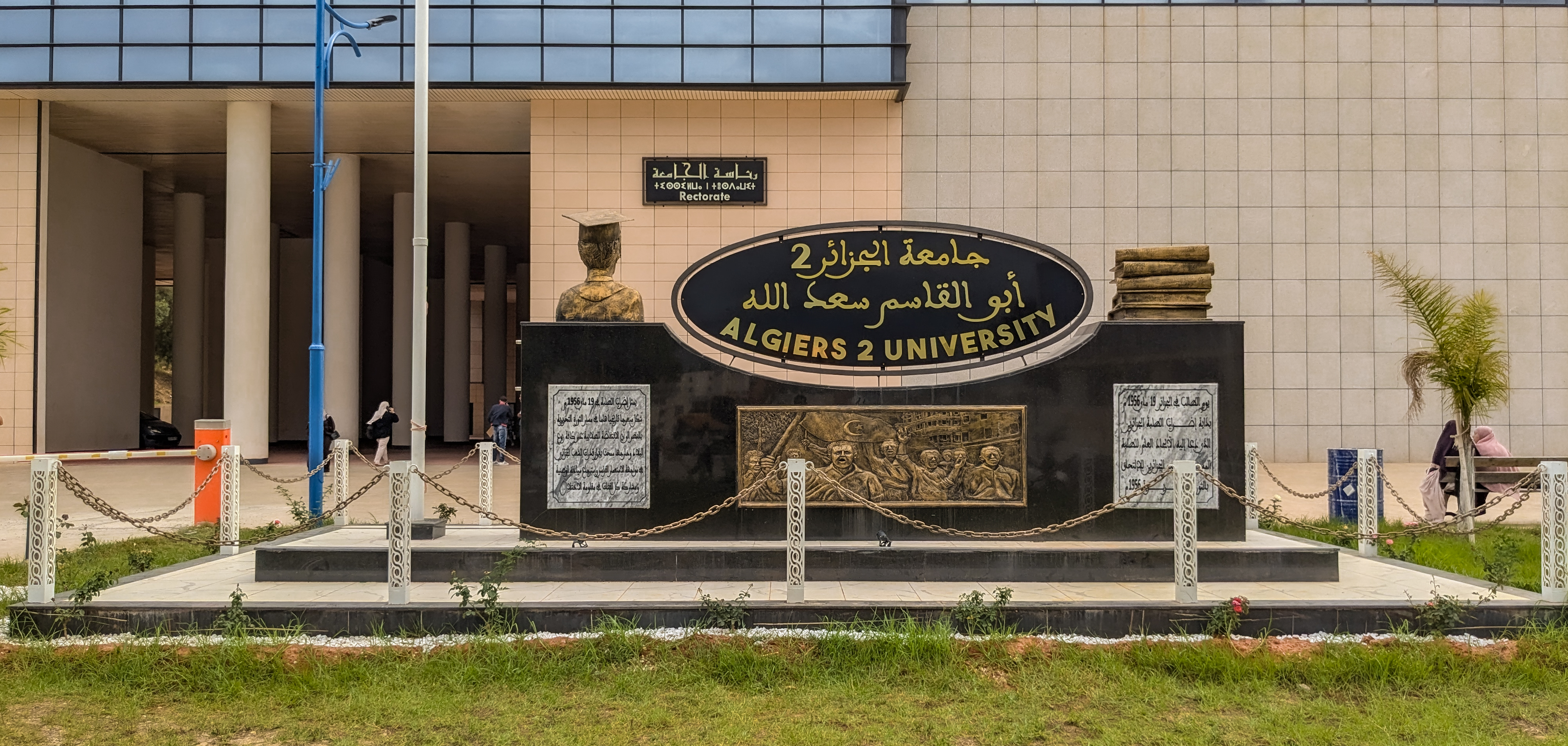
- Type: Public
- Established: 2009; 17 years ago
- Location: Algiers, Algeria
- Website: www.univ-alger2.dz

The University of Algiers 2 (French: Université d'Alger 2), commonly called the Abou El Kacem Saadallah, is an Algerian public university located in Bouzareah, Algiers Province, in the north of the country.

Created in 2009 after the division of the University of Algiers to three universities (University of Algiers 1, University of Algiers 2 and University of Algiers 3).

== See also ==
- List of universities in Algeria
