= Karim Djoudi =

Algerian politician (1958–2022)

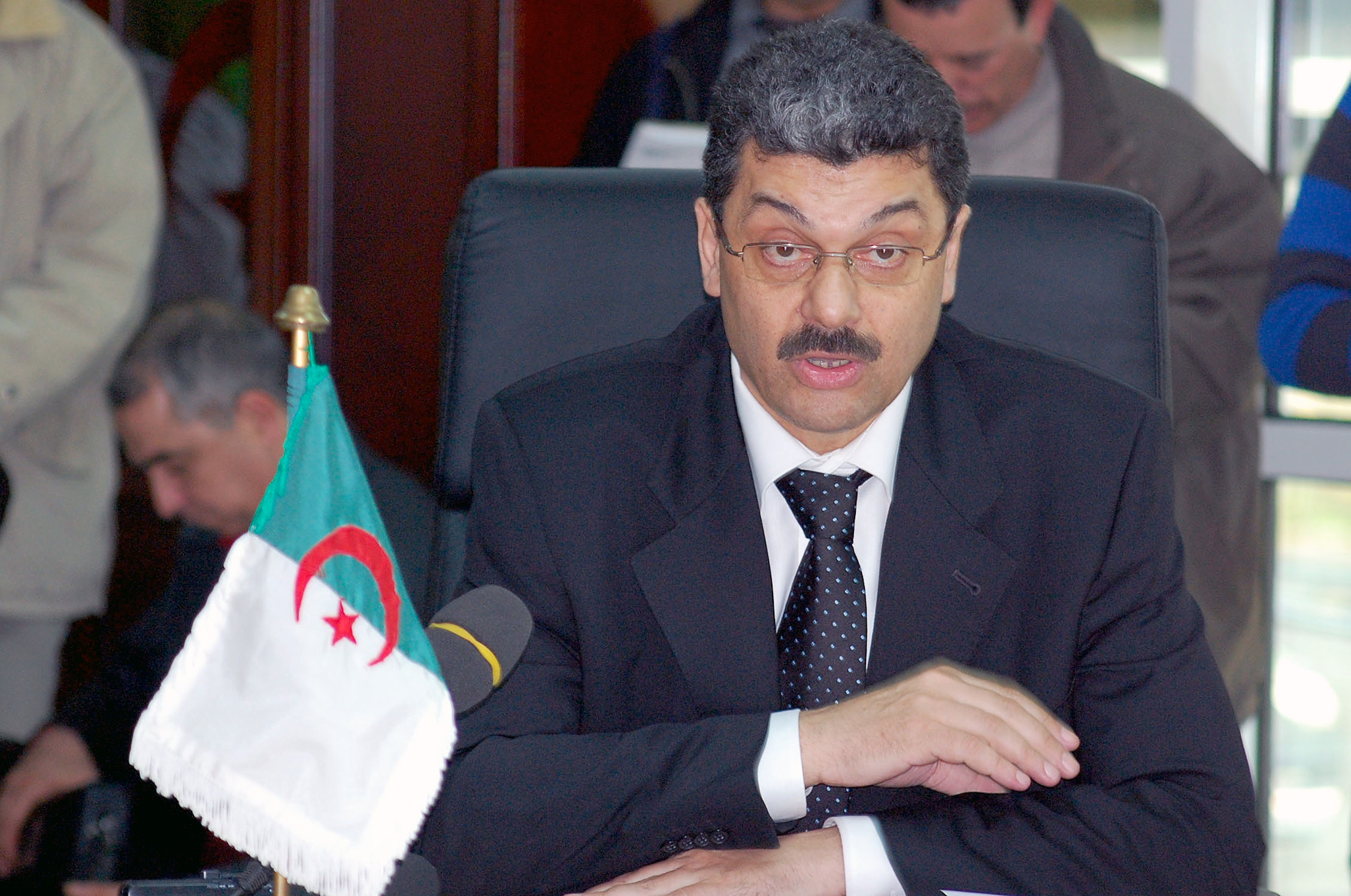
- Djoudi in 2011

Minister of Finance
- In office 4 June 2007 – 5 May 2014
- President: Abdelmadjid Tebboune
- Prime Minister: Abdelaziz Belkhadem; Ahmed Ouyahia; Abdelmalek Sellal; Youcef Yousfi; Abdelmalek Sellal
- Preceded by: Mourad Medelci
- Succeeded by: Mohamed Djellab

Personal details
- Born: 13 July 1958 Montpellier, France
- Died: 13 May 2022 (aged 63)
- Party: Workers' Party
- Education: University of Strasbourg

Karim Djoudi (Arabic: كريم جودي; 13 July 1958 – 13 May 2022) was an Algerian politician. He was born in Montpellier, France. He was the Minister of Finance of Algeria from June 2007 to May 2014, in office since 2007. In 2011 Djoudi froze the assets of Muammar Gaddafi in Algeria.
