= Laaziz Fayed =

Algerian politician

- العزيز فايد
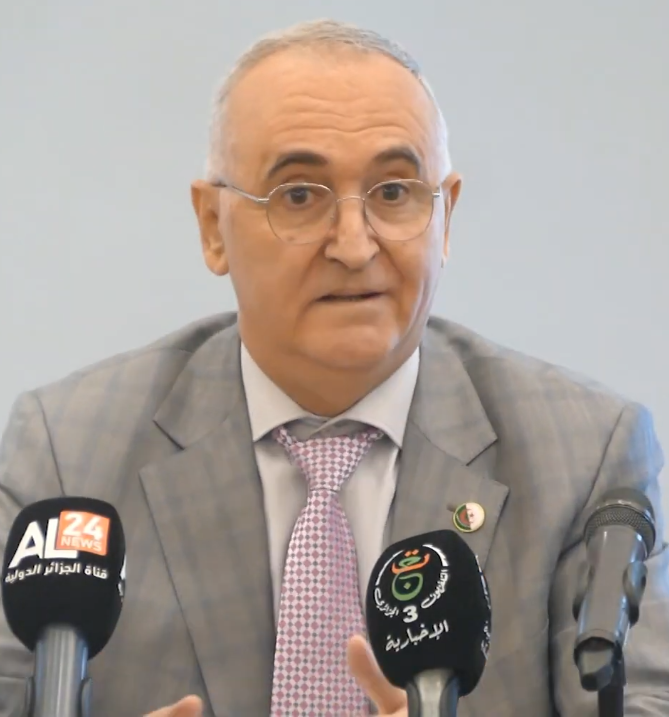
- Fayed in 2023

Minister of Finance
- In office 16 March 2023 – 2 February 2025
- President: Abdelmadjid Tebboune
- Prime Minister: Aymen Benabderrahmane; Nadir Larbaoui
- Preceded by: Brahim Djamel Kassali
- Succeeded by: Abdelkrim Bouzred

Personal details
- Born: January 19, 1961 (age 65)
- Education: Jean Moulin University Lyon 3 (PhD)

Laaziz Fayed (Arabic: العزيز فايد; born 19 January 1961) is an Algerian politician who served as the Minister of Finance from 2023 to 2025. He was appointed as minister on 16 March 2023.

== Education ==
Fayed holds a Diploma in Finances from the National Institute des Finances, a Diploma in Public Finance and Taxation and a PhD in Public Finance from the Jean Moulin University Lyon 3.
