= Benali Boudghène =

Algerian nationalist and guerilla (1934–1960)

Colonel Lotfi Dghine Benali
- بن علي دغين بودغن
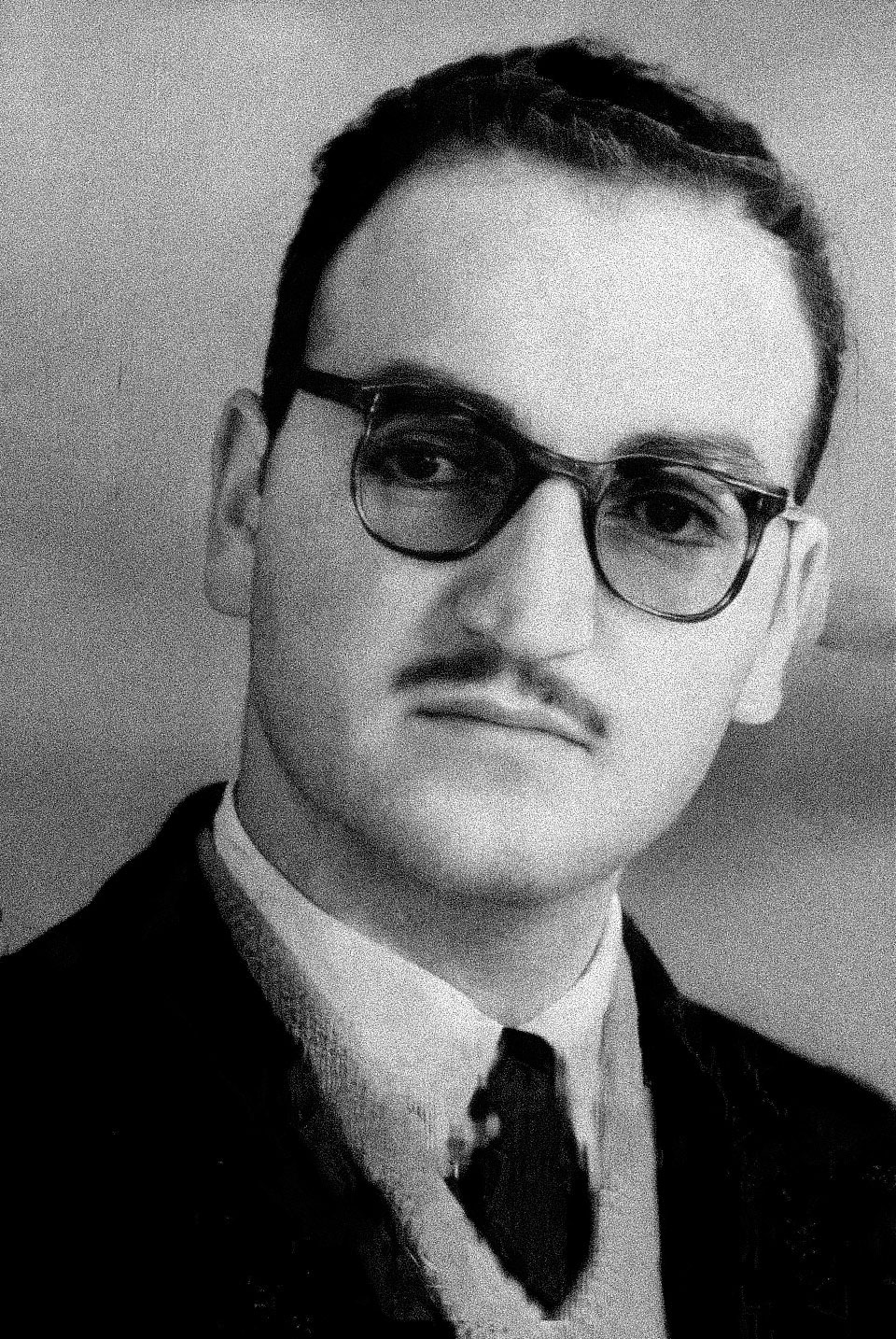
- Born: May 5, 1934; Tlemcen, French Algeria (present-day Algeria)
- Died: March 27, 1960 (aged 25); Béchar, French Algeria
- Burial place: El Alia Cemetery
- Other names: Colonel Lotfi, Si Brahim
- Military career
- Service years: 1954–1960
- Rank: Colonel
- Nickname: Colonel Lotfi
- Conflicts: Algerian War

Benali Dghine Boudghene (Arabic: بن علي دغين بودغن; May 5, 1934 – March 27, 1960), commonly known as Colonel Lotfi, was born on 5 May 1934 in Tlemcen in Algeria. Benali was an Algerian leader in the Algerian War, organising the Wilaya V from 1958 to 1960. He first worked as a Political leader with the National Liberation Front then moved to fighting in battlefield; he was killed in Béchar by French troops in 1960

== Biography ==
He was born on May 7, 1934, in Tlemcen in western Algeria.

== Joining the Liberation Front ==
He joined the National Liberation Front at an early age, developing a good reputation among other members and he could handle responsibilities, until he decided to move to fight in the battlefield.

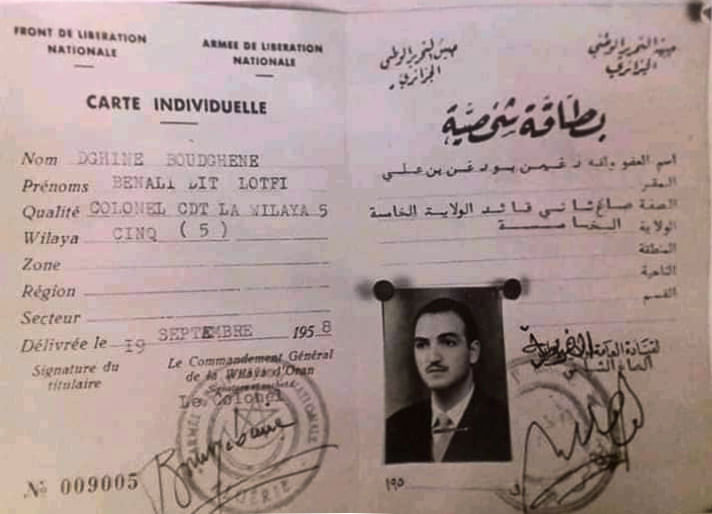
FLN-ALN identity card of Colonel Lotfi, issued in 1958.

== Death ==
Colonel Lotfi died in battle against French troops on March 27, 1960, two years before independence in a mountain in eastern Béchar.

== Legacy ==
He is considered a national hero in Algeria. The airport of Béchar, Boudghene Ben Ali Lotfi Airport was named after him. A movie was produced with the name of "Lotfi" narrating his story and struggle against French rule in Algeria. In Oran one of the biggest streets in the city has his name; a high school there is named after him.

== See also ==
- French rule in Algeria
- History of Algeria
- Provinces of Algeria
- Algerian War
