= Ministry of Finance (Algeria) =

Government ministry of Algeria

- وزارة المالية

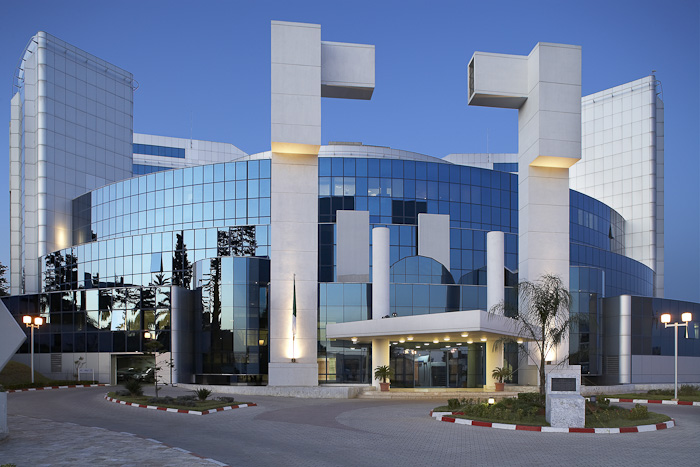
- Ministry of Finance building, the Immeueble Ahmed Francis

Agency overview
- Formed: 27 September 1962
- Headquarters: Immeuble Ahmed Francis Ben Aknoun, Algiers
- Agency executive: Abdelkrim Bouzred, Minister of Finance
- Website: www.mf.gov.dz

The Ministry of Finance (Arabic: وزارة المالیة, French: Ministère des finances) is a government ministry of Algeria responsible for public finances. As of 2025, Abdelkrim Bouzred is the current Minister of Finance.

== Ministers of Finance ==
- Ahmed Francis, 1962 – 1963
- Bachir Boumaza, September 1963 – July 1965
- Kaïd Ahmed, July 1965 – March 1968
- Cherif Belkacem, March 1968 – April 1969
- Ahmed Medeghri, April 1969 – July 1970
- Smaïn Mahroug, July 1970 – February 1976
- Abdelmalek Temmam, February 1976 – April 1977
- Mohamed Seddik Benyahia, April 1977 – March 1979
- M'hamed Yala, March 1979 – January 1982
- Boualem Benhamouda, January 1982 – February 1986
- Abdelaziz Khellef, February 1986 – November 1988
- Sid Ahmed Ghozali, November 1988 – September 1989
- Ghazi Hidouci, September 1989 – June 1991
- Hocine Benissad, June 1991 – October 1991
- Sid Ahmed Ghozali, October 1991 – June 1992
- Belaid Abdessalam, July 1992 – August 1993
- Mourad Benachenhou, August 1993 – April 1994
- Ahmed Benbitour, April 1994 – September 1996
- Abdelkrim Harchaoui, September 1996 – December 1999
- Abdelatif Benachenhou, December 1999 – May 2001
- Mourad Medelci, May 2001 – June 2002
- Mohamed Terbéche, June 2002 – May 2003
- Abdelatif Benachenhou, May 2003 – May 2005
- Mourad Medelci, May 2005 – June 2007
- Karim Djoudi, June 2007 – May 2014
- Mohamed Djellab, May 2014 – May 2015
- Abderrahmane Benkhalfa, May 2015 – June 2016
- Hadji Baba Ammi, June 2016 – May 2017
- Abderrahmane Raouya, May 2017 – March 2019
- Mohamed Loukal, March 2019 – January 2020
- Abderrahmane Raouya, January 2020 – June 2020
- Aïmene Benabderrahmane, June 2020 – February 2022
- Abderrahmane Raouya, February 2022 – June 2022
- Brahim Djamel Kassali, June 2022 – March 2023
- Laaziz Fayed, March 2023 – February 2025
- Abdelkrim Bouzred, since February 2025
