= Pol Theis =

Pol G. Theis
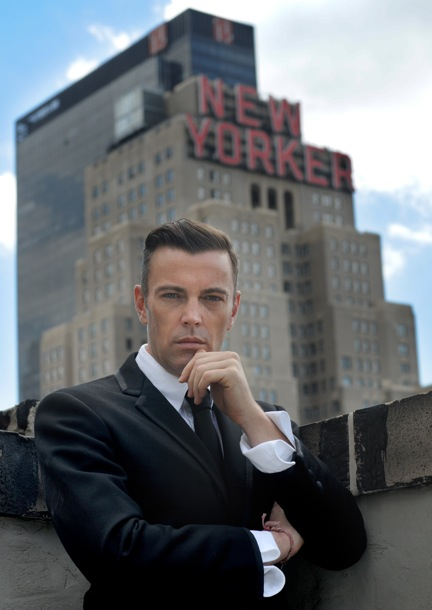
- Born: February 10, 1968 (age 58); Luxembourg
- Education: Master's degrees in Business, Economic, and Tax law
- Alma mater: Panthéon-Assas University; Paris-Sorbonne University
- Occupation: Interior designer
- Years active: 2002–present
- Organization(s): P&T Interiors

Pol Theis (born February 10, 1968) is a Luxembourger attorney and interior designer. He is the founder and principal of the international interior design firm P&T Interiors, which is based in New York City. Before pursuing interior design, he was a corporate lawyer, based in Luxembourg and Paris.

== Personal background ==
Theis was born on February 10, 1968, in Luxembourg. He attended Panthéon-Assas University, graduating in 1993, with a Master's degree in Business and Tax Law. The following year, he graduated from Paris-Sorbonne University with a Master's in Business and Economic Law. He was admitted to the Luxembourg Bar in 1995.

== Professional background ==
Law

After graduating from Paris Sorbonne University, Theis began practicing law in Luxembourg at Wildgen Spielmann & Ries. In 1996, he moved to Paris and continued his practice at Stibbe Simont Monahan Duhot, before joining the staff of Haarmann Hemmelrath.

Interior design

In 2002, he relocated to New York and established the interior design firm of P&T Interiors. He designed his own 2,000-square-foot Manhattan loft apartment (formally a carpet warehouse), which was later featured in New York Home magazine and The Wall Street Journal. He has designed for clients in New York City, The Hamptons, France, and Luxembourg. His interior design work has been published in over 50 journals, including New York Spaces, The New York Observer, Elle Decor, Objeckt International, and Michèle Schumacher magazine. His work has also been presented in the 2013 book, East Coast Modern: Contemporary Residential Architecture and Interiors.

== Honors and awards ==
- 2011: International Property Awards in association with Bloomberg Television
- 2012: Top 50 Designers by New York Spaces
- 2013 Top 50 Designers by New York Spaces
- 2014 Top 50 Designers by New York Spaces

== Published work ==
—Magazines—

2006

- Residences Decoration
- Residences Decoration
- Uhmepbep

2007

- 4homes
- Elle Décor
- New York Home, May/June 2007, pages 96-99
- Elle Decoration
- Residences Decoration
- L'Expansion
- Elle Decoration
- Architectural Digest
- Elle Décor

2008

- New York Spaces
- Les Plus Beaux Interieurs
- Residences Decoration
- Architectural Digest
- Uhmepbep
- In/Out

2009

- New York Spaces
- Objekt International
- Objekt International
- Residences Decoration
- Toute la Maison
- Architectural Digest
- Uhmepbep
- Objekt International

2010

- Michele Schumacher, no2, pages 138-143
- New York Spaces
- New York Observer
- Residences Decoration
- Uhmepbep
- Elle Decoration
- Revue

2011

- Michele Schumacher
- World's Best 2011
- Property Summit 2011
- Wall Street Journal
- Residences Decoration

2012

- International Property, British Airways
- International Property
- International Property, Emirates
- New York Spaces
- Les Plus Beaux Interieurs
- L'Eventail
- Residences Decoration
- Harper's Bazaar
- Hong Kong
- City Magazine

2013

- New York Spaces
- Villa
- New York Spaces
- Hamptons Cottages and Gardens
- New York Spaces - Top 50 Designers
- Residences Decoration
- New York Spaces

2014

- Simply You Living
- NY Spaces
- NY Spaces
- Living Etc
- South China Morning Post

2015

- Elle Decoration
- Eigen Huis & Interieur
- Marie Claire Maison

—Books—

2012

- Interiors New York
- Interiors New York

2013

- Interiors New York
- Luxury Interiors
- East Coast Modern
