= Franck R. Boulin =

French diplomat

Personal details
- Born: December 15, 1952 Neuilly-sur-Seine, France

Franck R. Boulin is a French lawyer (attorney-at-law), member of the Bar of Lawyers of Paris. He works also as an international expert in Parliamentary Development.

He was born in Neuilly-sur-Seine in December 1952.

== Biography ==
Franck Boulin was appointed the first Secretary-General of the Assembly of Kosovo during the Provisional Institutions of Self-Government (2001–02) before being made principal international adviser to the Assembly of Kosovo. He has worked with the United Nations Development Programme on various parliamentary capacity-building programs in North Africa, the Middle East and Southeast Asia. He is the Honorary Secretary of the Association of Secretaries-General of Parliaments, a branch of the Inter-Parliamentary Union. Franck Boulin holds a master's degree in law from Sorbonne University and a doctorate in political studies from Panthéon-Assas University, both in Paris. He has worked for 20 years as a senior legislative advisor to the French Parliament and the German Bundestag.

== Bibliography ==
- A Conceptual Framework for the Development of Parliamentary Institutions, 2009, ANU College of Asia & the Pacific, http://www.parliamentarystudies.anu.edu.au/papers_etc/2009/publications/Boulin.pdf.
- Dossier pour la nouvelle plate-forme aéroportuaire, 2001, Débat Public, https://web.archive.org/web/20081114061424/http://www.debatpublic.fr/docs/debats/01_DUCSAI/Dossier_Ducsai_8-08-01.doc, Participant.
