= Common Compiler Feedback Format =

The Common Compiler Feedback Format is an XML schema defined by The Portland Group for use in benchmarking and debugging optimizing compilers. It is available under an open source license for use by other entities, in an attempt to allow the standardization of similar functionality across multiple compiler tools.
