= University of Algiers 1 =

Public university in Algiers, Algeria

Coordinates: 36°46′15″N 3°03′20″E

- جامعة الجزائر
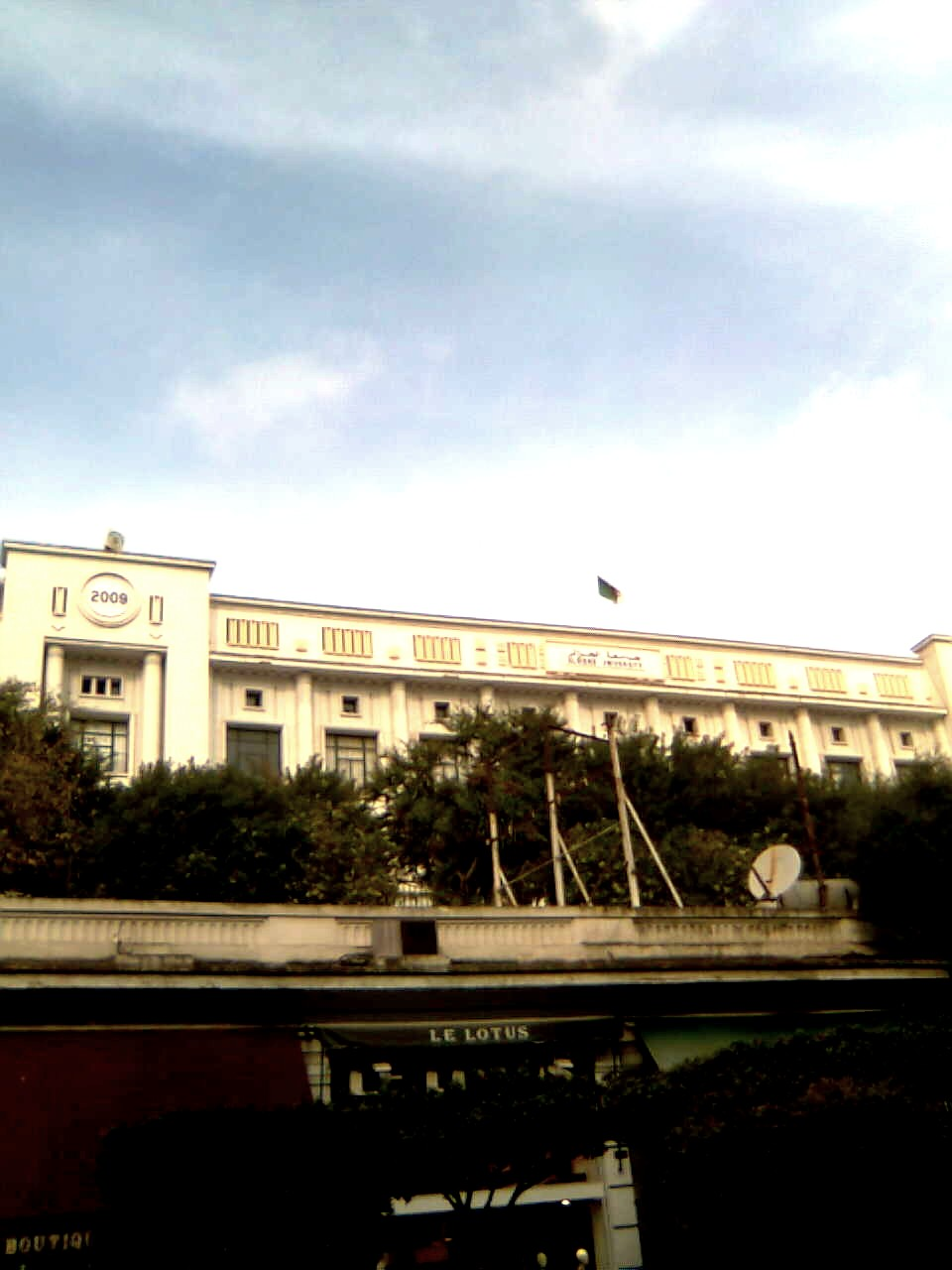
- Former names: Higher School of Letters of Algiers; Superior School of Medicine and Pharmacy; School of Sciences of Algiers; School of Law of Algiers
- Motto: Integritas, Scientia, Vis (Latin)
- Motto in English: Integrity, Knowledge, Strength
- Type: Public research university
- Established: 1909; 117 years ago
- Affiliations: Association of African Universities; Association of Arab Universities; Erasmus+ Mediterranean Universities Union
- President: Ali Abubaha
- Rector: Fares Mokhtari
- Students: 45,000
- Location: Algiers, Algeria
- Campus: Urban, suburban
- Colors: Green; Red
- Website: www.univ-alger.dz//
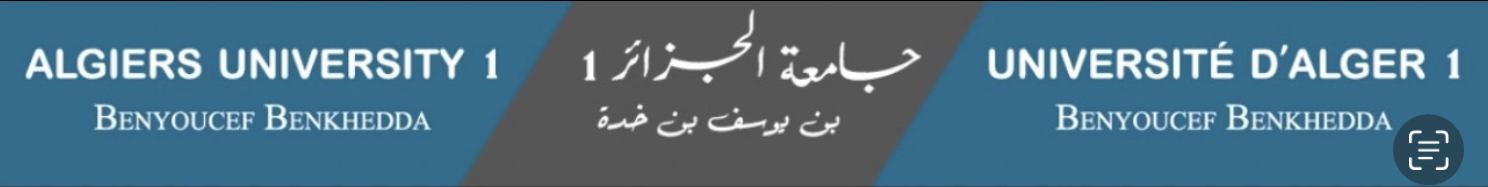

The University of Algiers 1 (Arabic: جامعة الجزائر, romanized: Jāmiʻat al-Jazāʼir), commonly called Benyoucef Benkhedda, is a public research university based in Algiers, Algeria. Founded in 1909 from the amalgamation of different French colonial educational institutions, it has become the oldest and most prestigious university in the country.

== History ==
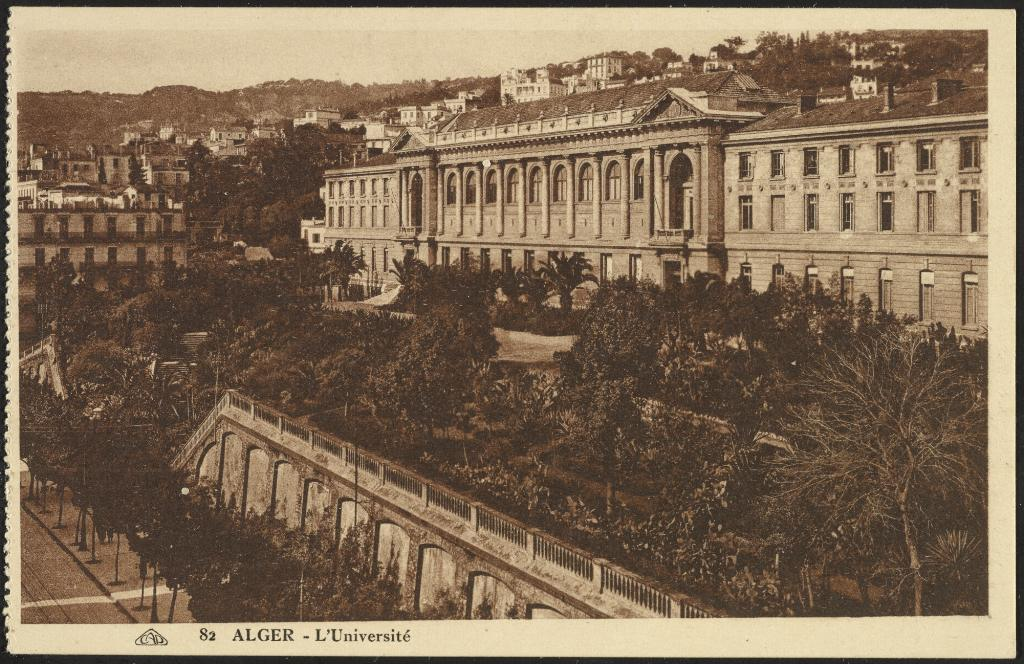
The University of Algiers in 1920.

=== French colonialism, 1830–1962 ===
The historical tradition of higher education in Algeria began in 1832, with the creation of the Higher School of Letters of Algiers (École supérieure des lettres d'Alger), as a way to guarantee the teaching of Arabic and French languages, in the context of the French conquest of Algeria. In 1849 the institution opened campuses in Oran and Constantine, and was formally integrated into the regular French education system on 20 December 1879. Subsequently, the Superior School of Medicine and Pharmacy (École supérieure de médecine et de pharmacie) was created in 1833 (officialized on 4 August 1857); in 1868 the School of Sciences (École supérieure des sciences), and; in 1879 the School of Law (École supérieure de droit). All were based in the city of Algiers.

In 1909, these Superior Schools were turned into the Faculties of Letters, Law, Medicine and Pharmacy, and Sciences. Soon after, in the same year, the faculties were united to form the University of Algiers. With this change, the University of Algiers became the only colonial French higher education institution on par with a metropolitan universities.

Throughout the French colonial period, the majority of student were European. Arab and Berber Algerians only made up a small minority, ranging from 1.2% to 18.1% of the total student body.

On 19 May 1956, the General Union of Algerian Muslim Students (UGEMA) called an indefinite student strike, which halted the academic courses and examinations at the University of Algiers, rallying support from the National Liberation Front.

On 7 June 1962 – just a month ahead of the Algerian independence referendum – the Organisation Armée Secrète (OAS), the movement of colonists opposing Algerian independence, set fire to the library building, destroying 500,000 books. The destruction of these books and the library was reported in the Arab world as a tactic of war or dirty war, known as scorched earth. Egypt, Iraq and Jordan condemned the arson and issued repudiation notes. It showed the savagery of the anti-independence movement would extend to removing and indeed destroying culture so long as Algeria intended to create its own national culture.

=== Algerian independence, 1962–present ===
The 1971 higher education reform abolished the college system and grouped the different disciplines by affinities into departments and institutes. The reform decrees the progressive Arabization of the disciplines, starting with certain classes in the social sciences (initially, philosophy and history). On 12 December 1998, the college system was re-established.

In 2009 the university was subdivided into three new institutions. The most important, the University of Algiers Benyoucef Benkhedda (or University of Algiers 1), stands as heir to the historical-academic tradition. The other two institutions created were:

- Abou El Kacem Saadallah University (University of Algiers 2);
- Brahim Soltane Chaibout University (University of Algiers 3).

In 2015, due to the state of degradation of the university's buildings, professors, students and supporters demanded that the university be classified as a national historical-architectural heritage. The Ministry of Culture responded to the claims in July 2015.

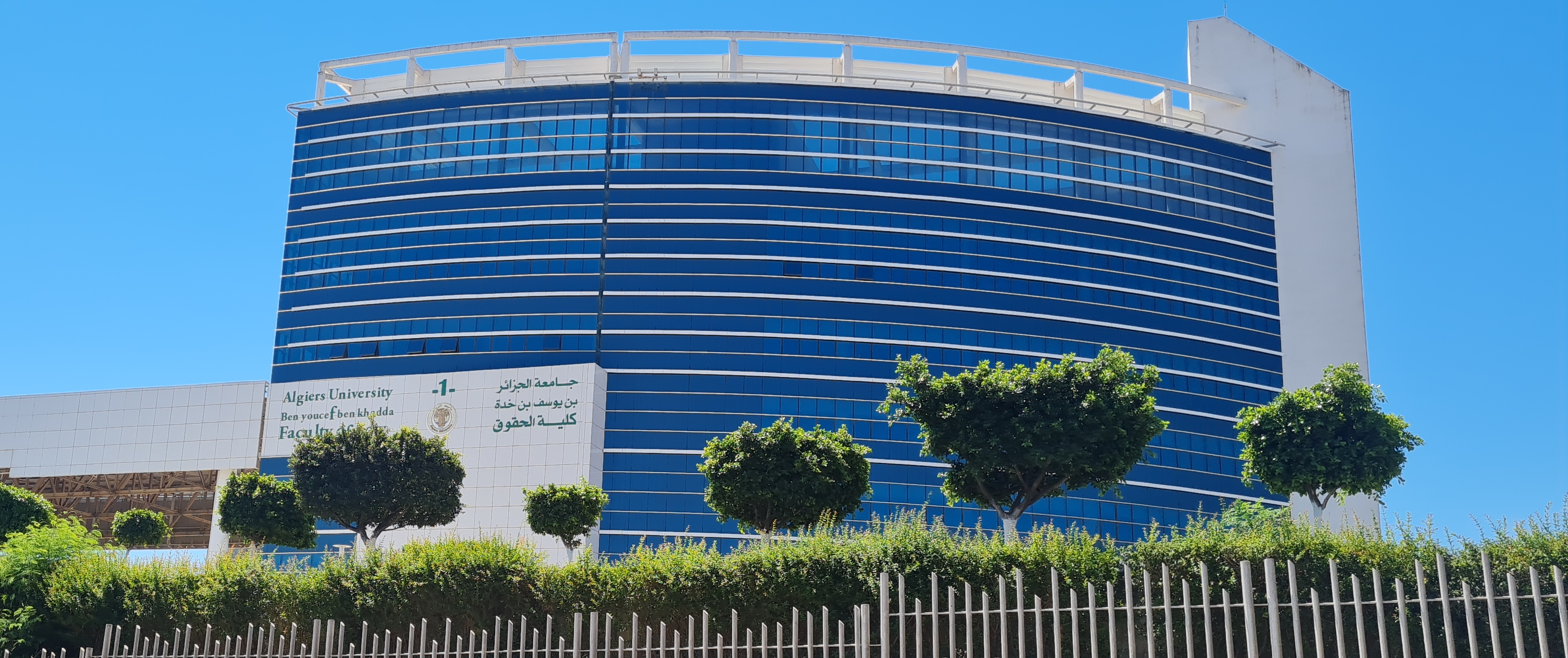
New law faculty in Saïd Hamdine

== Library ==
The library holds 800,000 volumes.

== Notable faculty ==
- Fernand Braudel (1902–1985) – French historian
- John Peters Humphrey (1905–1995) – Canadian legal scholar
- André Chastagnol (1920–1996) – French historian
- Assia Djebar (1936–2015) – novelist, translator, film maker
- Ahmed Zaoui – Islamic scholar, obtained refugee status in New Zealand in 2014

== Notable alumni ==
=== Arts and Science ===
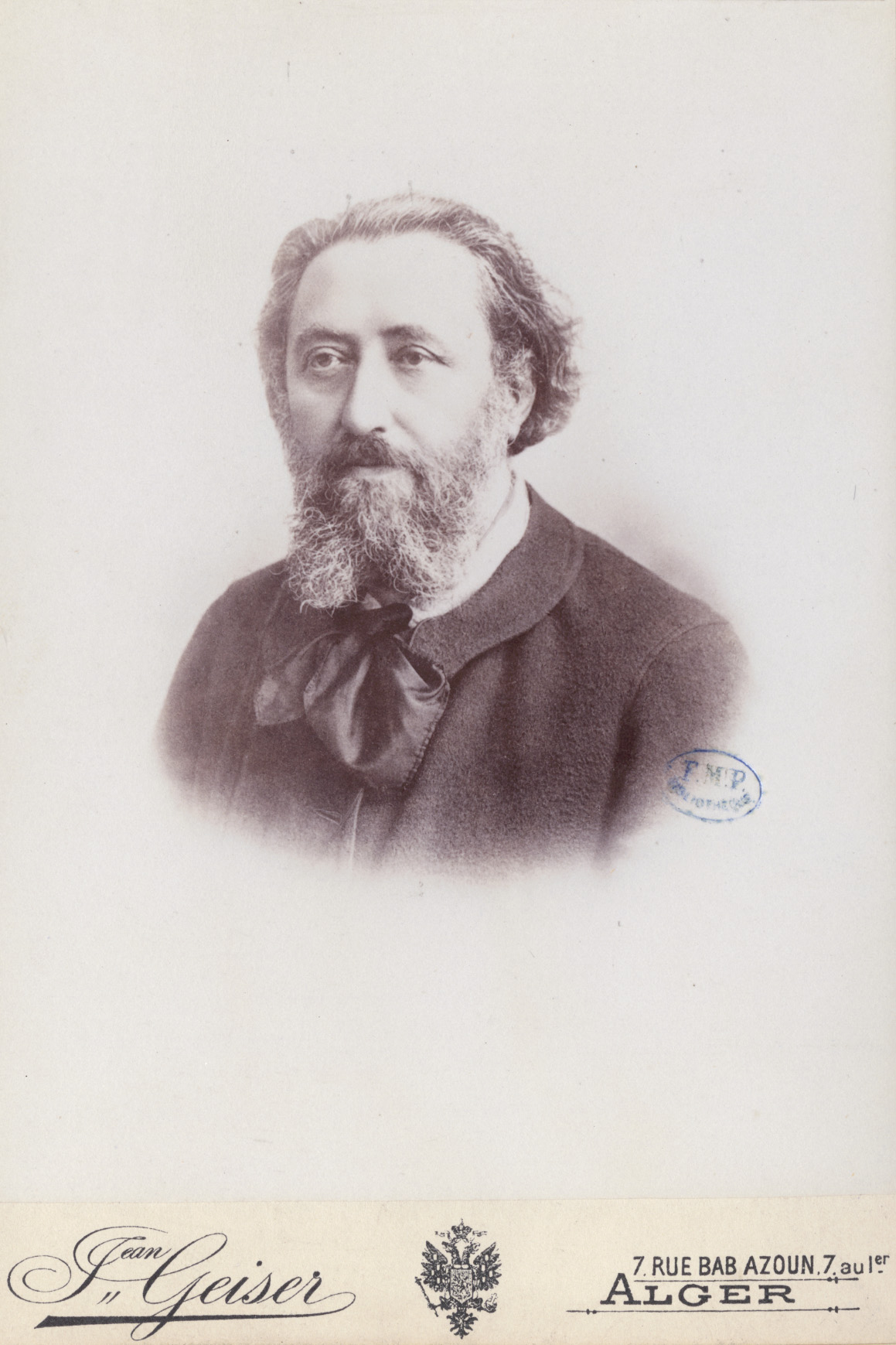
Jean Baptiste Paulin Trolard

- Jean Baptiste Paulin Trolard (1842–1910) – physician; the "vein of Trolard" (the superior anastomotic vein) was named after him
- Albert Camus (1913–1960) – writer and the awardee of the Nobel Prize for Literature in 1957.
- Paul Coste-Floret (1911–1979) law professor and politician
- Albert Memmi (1920–2020) – Tunisian scholar
- Suzanne Carrell (1923–2019) – educator
- Gabriel Camps (1927–2002) – archaeologist and social anthropologist
- Maurice Audin (1932–1957) – mathematician and political activist
- Fadéla M'rabet (1935-2025) – writer and feminist.
- Fatima Gallaire (1944–2020) – author and playwright
- Youcef Saad (born 1950) – mathematician
- Bernard Picinbono (born 1933) – applied statistician
- Elias Zerhouni (born 1951) – Algerian-born American physician scientist radiologist and biomedical engineer.
- Saddek Rabah (born 1968) – University Professor and academic researcher.
- Kaouther Adimi (born 1986) – writer
- Abdelkader Rezig Elmokhadimi (1950–2022) – author and journalist.
- Badra Ben Mustapha (1912–1993) – Tunisian midwife and activist

=== Politics and Diplomacy ===
- Ferhat Abbas (1899–1985) – politician
- Mohamed Lamine Debaghine (1917–2003) – political activist
- Mehdi Ben Barka (1920–1965?) – Moroccan politician; disappeared in 1965
- Lakhdar Brahimi (born 1934) – UN diplomat and Algerian Minister of Foreign Affairs.
- Hassiba Ben Bouali (1938–1957) – political activist
- Ferhat Mehenni (born 1951) – political activist
- Ahmed Djoghlaf (born 1953) – executive secretary of the Convention on Biological Diversity
- Said Djinnit (born 1954) – United Nations diplomat
- Brahim Djamel Kassali (born 1954) – Algerian Minister of Finance
- Khalida Toumi (born 1958) – feminist activist
- Lehbib Mohamed Abdelaziz (1989–2026) – Sahrawi military commander and politician

== See also ==
- List of colleges and universities
- List of universities in Algeria
- Universities and colleges in Algeria
