= Congress of French Culture in Florida =

Le Congrès de la Culture Française en Floride, Inc.
- Location: Orlando, Florida
- Established: 1952
- President: Valerie Lecomte
- Vice president: Hannah Humphries
- General secretary: Molly Ryan
- Treasurer: Marissa Tessier
- Members: 1,500+
- Website: link

The Congress of French Culture in Florida (French: Le Congrès de la culture française en Floride), also referred to as CCFF or simply Le Congrès, is an academic organization that holds competitions annually in Orlando, Florida, to promote literacy in French culture and language among middle and high school students. The name also refers to the organizational body that oversees the event and its preparation.

== History ==
Three French instructors from Jacksonville conceived the foundation of the competition in the fall of 1952: Lelia Alexander of Julia E. Landon High School (now Julia Landon College Preparatory and Leadership Development School), Cornelia Burge of Duncan U. Fletcher High School, and Doris McCleary of Andrew Jackson High School. The first competition was held in April of 1953 at the Provençal House of Rollins College and continued to occur annually.

=== Suzanne Carrell ===
In 1962, professor Suzanne Carrell facilitated the event's relocation to Jacksonville University where it had remained for several years. A French national, Carrell, was highly praised for her work in strengthening the cultural ties between the United States and France, particularly in the relationship between the sister cities of Jacksonville and Nantes. In 1980, a scholarship open to participants of the Congrès was established in her name and continues to this day. In recognition of her work, French President Jacques Chirac decreed upon her the French Legion of Honor in the competition's fiftieth year (2002). In the competition's sixtieth year (2012), Carrell would also receive the National Order of Merit.

Despite having retired in 1989, Carrell continued to chair the organization until her death in 2019.

=== After Jacksonville ===
Today, the competition is principally held in Orlando, Florida.

== Purpose ==
Students from participating middle schools and high schools compete in various challenges designed to test fluency in French as well as knowledge of French culture. These challenges include la lecture (reading proficiency), le discours (improvised oration), la déclamation (poetry recitation), and le casse-tête (lit. "break-head", a quiz bowl). Separately, students who demonstrate in writing an intent to continue their studies in French (especially in higher education) are allowed to win multiple scholarships, the most notable of which is the Bourse Suzanne Carrell. The organization's homepage claims that the event allows students to "meet other enthusiastic Francophiles who inspire one another."
