= University of Algiers 3 =

Public university in Dély Ibrahim, Algieria

Coordinates: 36°45′24.3″N 2°59′1.6″E

- جامعة الجزائر 3
- Type: Public
- Established: 2009; 17 years ago
- Location: Algiers, Algeria
- Website: www.univ-alger3.dz

The University of Algiers 3 (French: Université d'Alger 3), commonly called the Brahim Soltane Chaibout, is an Algerian public university located in Dély Ibrahim, Algiers Province, in the north of the country.

It was established in accordance with Executive Decree No. 09-341 of 22 October 2009 after the division of the University of Algiers to three universities (University of Algiers 1, University of Algiers 2 and University of Algiers 3).

== Faculties and Institutes ==
The faculties and institute of the University of Algiers 3 are as follows:

- Faculty of Economics and Management;
- Faculty of Political Science and International Relations;
- Faculty of Information and Communication Sciences;
- Institute of Physical Education and Sport.
