= List of universities in Algeria =

This is a list of universities in Algeria. The Ministry of Higher Education and Scientific Research lists 114 universities and colleges within the country.

== List of universities ==
Province	University Name	Established	Type	Website				
Province	University Name	Established	Type	Website	Adrar	University of Ahmed Draia	1986	Public
Aïn Defla	Djilali Bounaama University of Khemis Miliana	1991	Public	(in Arabic)				
Aïn Témouchent	Belhadj Bouchaib University Centre of Ain Témouchent		Public					
Algiers	Benyoucef Benkhedda University of Algiers	1832	Public	(in French)				
Algiers	University of Algiers Abou El Kacem Saadallah	2009	Public	(in Arabic)				
Algiers	University of Algiers Brahim Soltane Chaibout	2009	Public	(in Arabic)				
Algiers	University of Science and Technology Houari Boumediene	1974	Public					
Algiers	University of Continuing Education (UFC)	1990	Public	https://ufc.dz(in Arabic)				
Algiers	Higher School of Social Security	2012	Public	https://esss.dz (in French)				
Algiers	National School of Administration (ENA)	1964	Public	http://www.ena.dz(in Arabic)				
Algiers	National Higher School of Artificial Intelligence (ENSIA)	2021	Public	https://www.ensia.edu.dz/				
Algiers	National Higher School of Mathematics (NHSM)	2021	Public	nhsm.edu.dz				
Algiers	National Polytechnic School	1925	Public	https://www.enp.edu.dz/en/				
Algiers	Higher National Veterinary School (ENSV)	1970	Public	https://www.ensv.dz/				
Algiers	National Higher School of Agronomy (ENSA)	1905	Public	https://www.ensa.dz/en/				
Algiers	National School of Computer Science (INI)	1969	Public	https://www.esi.dz/				
Algiers	Higher School of Kouba		Public	https://www.ens-kouba.dz/english/				
Algiers	National Higher School of Bouzaréah (ENSB)	1984	Public	https://ensb.dz/?lang=en				
Algiers	National School of Marine and Coastal Sciences (ENSSMAL)	2008	Public	https://www.enssmal.edu.dz/en/home/				
Algiers	National School of Journalism and Information Sciences	2015	Public	https://ensjsi.dz/en				
Algiers	National School of Public Works	1966	Public	http://www.entp.edu.dz/ (in French)				
Algiers	National School of Political Science	2009	Public	https://enssp.dz/en				
Algiers	National School of Technology	2016	Public	https://enst.dz/				
Algiers	Faculty of Law and Political	2025	Public	(in English) (in Arabic)				
Annaba	Badji Mokhtar Annaba University	1975	Public	(in French)				
Annaba	Higher School of Industrial Technologies	2017	Public					
Annaba	National School of Mines and Metallurgy	2009	Public	https://ensmm-annaba.dz/en/				
Batna	Université Colonel Hadj Lakhdar	1977	Public	(in French)				
Batna	Mostefa Ben Boulaid University	2015	Public					
Batna	National School of Renewable Energy, Environment and Sustainable Development		Public	http://www.hns-re2sd.dz/en-fr/ (in French)				
Batna	University Center of Barika	2011	Public	(in Arabic)				
Béchar	University of Tahri Mohammed Béchar	1986	Public	(in French)				
Béchar	Higher Normal School of Béchar	2015	Public	https://www.ens-bechar.dz/				
Béjaïa	University Abderrahmane Mira of Béjaïa	1983	Public					
Béjaïa	Higher School of Computer Science and Technology	2016	Public	https://estin.dz/				
Biskra	University of Mohamed Khider Biskra	1984	Public					
Blida	Saad Dahlab University of Blida	1977	Public	(in French)				
Blida	Ali Lounici University of Blida	2011	Public	(in Arabic)				
Blida	National Superior School of Hydraulics (ENSH)	1985	Public	https://www.ensh.dz/en/home/				
Bordj Bou Arréridj	Mohamed El Bachir El Ibrahimi University	2000	Public	(in French)				
Bouïra	Akli Mohand Oulhadj University of Bouïra	2001	Public	(in French)				
Boumerdès	M'hamed Bougara University of Boumerdès	1964	Public	(in French)				
Chlef	Hassiba Benbouali University of Chlef	1983	Public	(in French)				
Constantine	Mentouri University Constantine 1	1958	Public					
Constantine	Abdelhamid Mehri University Constantine 2	2011	Public	(in French)				
Constantine	Salah Boubnider University Constantine 3	2011	Public	(in French)				
Constantine	Emir Abdelkader University of Islamic Science	1984	Public					
Constantine	National Institute of Paramedical (Constantine)	1970	Public	/				
Constantine	National Polytechnic School of Constantine (ENPC)	2011	Public	https://enp-constantine.dz/en/				
Constantine	National School of Biotechnology (ENSB)		Public	https://www.ensbiotech.edu.dz/fr/				
Mila	University of Mila	2008	Public					
Djelfa	University of Djelfa	1990	Public					
El Bayadh	University Center of Nour Bachir El Bayadh	2010	Public					
El Oued	University of El Hamma Lakhdar Oued	1995	Public					
El Taref	University of Chadli Bendjedid El Taref	1992	Public	(in French)				
Ghardaïa	University of Ghardaïa	2004	Public	(in Arabic)				
Guelma	University of Guelma	1986	Public	(in French)				
Illizi	University Center of Illizi	2012	Public	(in French)				
Jijel	University of Jijel	1986	Public					
Khenchela	Abbes Laghrour University	2001	Public	(in French)				
Laghouat	University of Laghouat	1986	Public	(in French)				
Laghouat	University Center of Aflou	2012	Public	(in French)				
Laghouat	Higher Normal School of Laghouat	2012	Public	(in Arabic)				
Mascara	University of Mascara	1986	Public					
Medea	University of Medea	1989	Public					
Mila	Abdelhafid Boussouf University of Mila	2008	Public	(in French)				
Mostaganem	University of Mostaganem	1969	Public					
M'Sila	Mohamed Boudiaf University of M'Sila	1985	Public					
Naama	University Center of Naama	2010	Public	(in French)				
Oran	University of Oran 1 Ahmed Ben Bella	1961	Public					
Oran	University of Oran 2 Mohamed Ben Ahmed	2014	Public	(in French)				
Oran	University of Science and Technology Mohamed Boudiaf	1971	Public	(in French)				
Oran	Higher National School of Telecommunications and ICT Abdelhafid Boussouf	1971	Public	(in French)				
Oran	National Polytechnic School of Oran	2012	Public					
Ouargla	University of Ouargla	1988	Public	(in French)				
Ouargla	Higher Normal School of Ouargla	2015	Public	https://ens-ouargla.dz/				
Oum El Bouaghi	Larbi Ben M'hidi University of Oum El Bouaghi	1983	Public	(in French)				
Relizane	University Center of Relizane	2008	Public	(in French)				
Saïda	University of Saïda	1986	Public					
Sétif	Ferhat Abbas Sétif 1 University	1978	Public					
Sétif	Mohamed Lamine Debaghine Sétif 2 University	2011	Public					
Sidi Bel Abbès	Djillali Liabes University	1978	Public	(in French)				
Sidi Bel Abbès	Higher School of Computer Science of Sidi Bel Abbès	2014	Public	https://www.esi-sba.dz/fr/				
Skikda	University of Skikda	1988	Public	(in French)				
Souk Ahras	University of Souk Ahras Mohamed Chérif Messaadia	1998	Public					
Tamanrasset	University of Tamanrasset	2005	Public					
Tébessa	Echahid Cheikh Larbi Tebessi University	1985	Public	(in French)				
Tiaret	Ibn Khaldoun University of Tiaret	1980	Public	(in French)				
Tindouf	University Center of Tindouf		Public					
Tipaza	Abdallah Morsli University Center	2011	Public	(in French)				
Tipaza	Higher School of Management and Digital Economy		Public	http://www.esgen.edu.dz/				
Tipaza	Higher School of Magistracy	1989	Public	(in Arabic)				
Tipaza	Higher National School of Management	2008	Public	(in French)				
Tissemsilt	Ahmed Ben Yahia Al Wancharissi University Center	2005	Public	(in French)				
Tizi Ouzou	Mouloud Mammeri University of Tizi Ouzou	1977	Public	(in French)				
Tlemcen	University of Tlemcen	1974	Public					
Tlemcen	University Center of Maghnia	2006	Public					
Tlemcen	National School of Applied Sciences of Tlemcen (ENSAT)	2009	Public	https://www.essa-tlemcen.dz/en/				
Algiers	National Higher School of Cybersecurity	2024	Public	https://www.enscs.edu.dz/				
Algiers	National School of Nanoscience and Nanotechnology	2023	Public	https://www.nsnn.edu.dz/				
Algiers	National Higher School of Autonomous Systems Technology	2023	Public	https://nhsast.edu.dz/				

== See also ==
- Education in Algeria
- Ministry of Higher Education and Scientific Research in Algeria
- List of universities in Africa
