= Kamel Bidari =

Algerian politician

- كمال بداري
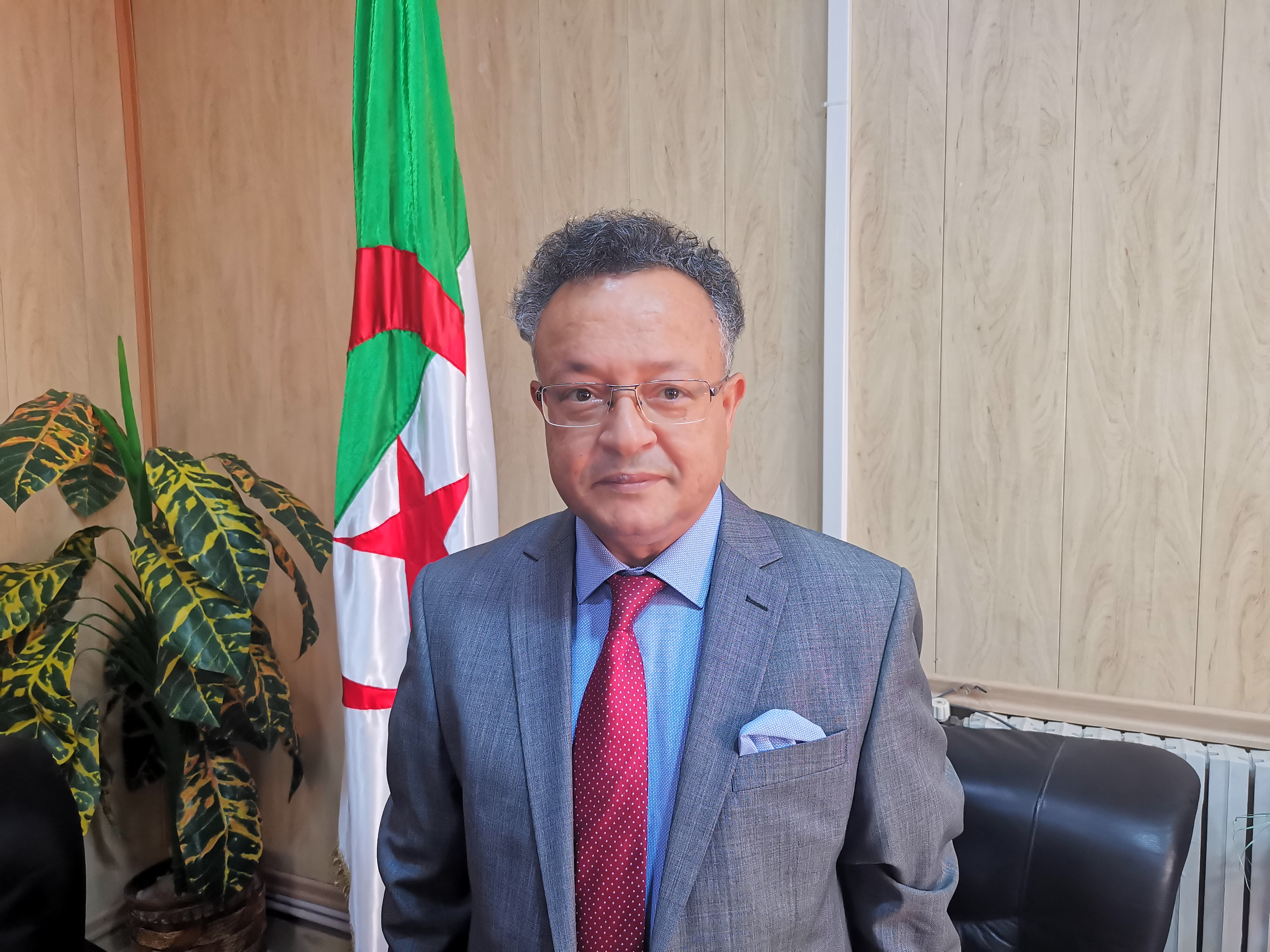
- Bidari in 2020

Minister of Higher Education and Scientific Research
- Incumbent
- Assumed office 9 September 2022
- President: Abdelmadjid Tebboune
- Prime Minister: Aymen Benabderrahmane; Nadir Larbaoui; Sifi Ghrieb (acting)
- Preceded by: Abdelbaki Benziane

Personal details
- Born: February 1, 1960 (age 66)
- Education: University of Boumerdès (MSc); Academy of Sciences of the Soviet Union (PhD)

Kamel Bidari (born 1 February 1960) is the Algerian Minister of Higher Education and Scientific Research. He was appointed minister on 9 September 2022.

He was born in 1960 in Biskra, Algeria. He is a geophysicist and he occupied the position of rector of the University of M'Sila, Algeria . In 2016 he was the president-representative of the Algerian Minister of Higher Education and Scientific Research, of the national steering and monitoring committee for the implementation of the pedagogical accompaniment program for the benefit of the teacher-researcher in Algeria. He has been a university professor since 1998.

He developed a complex parameter, combining several physical fields recorded during the rupture of large blocks of rock, precursor of the different stages of deformation of these solid bodies under high pressure and temperatures conditions.

== Education ==
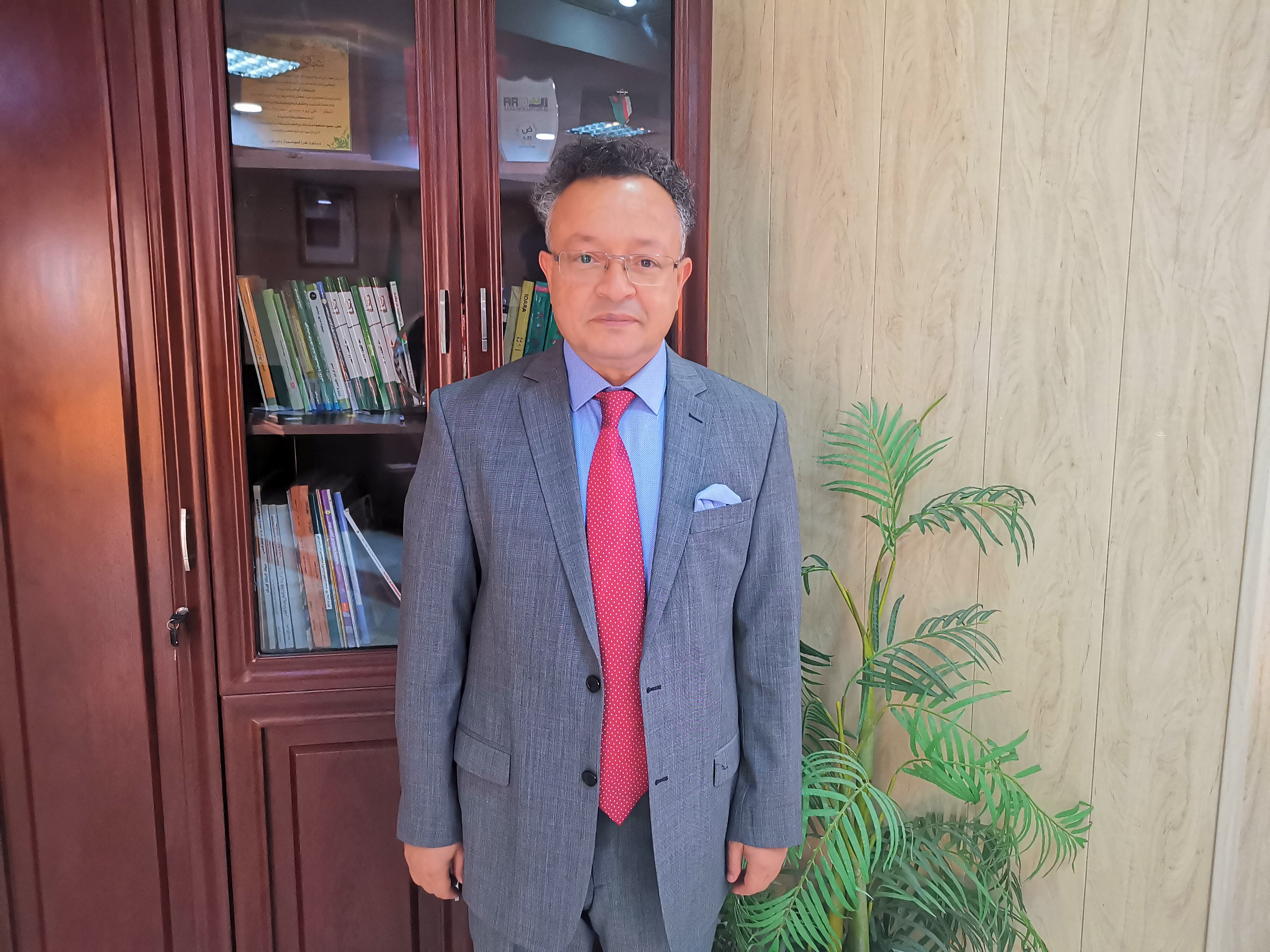
Pr. Baddari Kamel in 2020

Bidari holds a Bachelor of Science (1978) from the Lycée Ben Mhidi, a Master of Geophysics (1983) from the University of Boumerdès and a PhD of Geophysics(1987) from the Academy of Sciences of the Soviet Union.

In 1978, he obtained the scientific (Secondary School) Degree from Larbi Ben M’Hidi — Biskra high school. He has been graduated from the National Institute of Hydrocarbons and Chemistry (INH) in Boumerdes-Algeria (first of the student promotion of 1983), when he obtained «State Engineer» Degree in Geophysics. From 1983 to 1987, he prepared a Ph.D in geophysics at the Russian geological prospecting university and the Institute of Physics of the Earth- Academy of Sciences of USSR in Moscow. In 1988, he obtained the equivalent degree of the Algerian State Doctorate (Ministry of Higher Education and Scientific Research) — Algeria. In 1991, he received the Doctorate Nauk diploma in Physics and Mathematics (doktor physico mathematicheskikh nauk recognized for Soviet talented Scientist) for a thesis realized in Russian geological prospecting university and the Institute of Physics of the Earth - Academy of Sciences of the USSR Moscow about the complex studies of physical precursors of failure of rocks in relation to earthquake prediction, the fractal structure of geophysical field, and the simulation of seismic process. He obtained this highest scientific title for his contribution to the development of science.

== Career ==
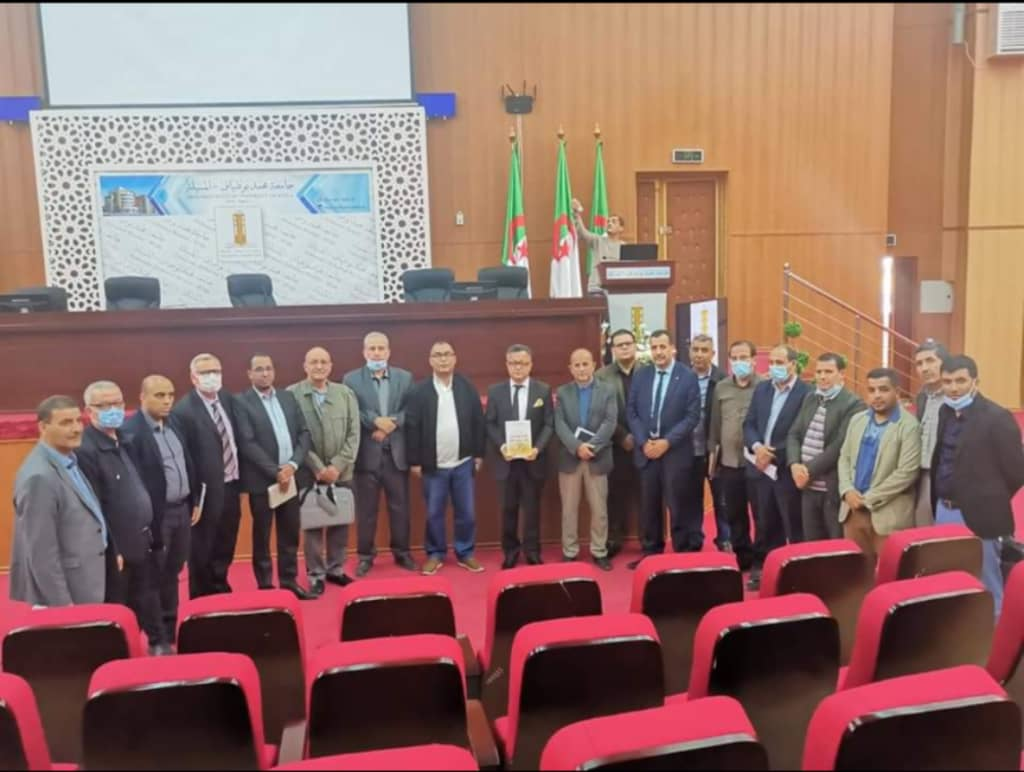
Pr Baddari President of the steering committee of the strategic development plan of M'Sila University PSD, 2017-2022

From 1990 until 1993, Bidari worked as head of department of Geophysics of Random Phenomena at the University of Boumerdès. Between July 1998 and September 2000, he was the Vice-Rector of the University of Boumerdès.

His transversal knowledge led him to contribute to strengthening the higher education. He was the head of several institutions: from 2017 to now: Rector of Mohamed Boudiaf university — M’Sila (Algeria); from 2016 to now: Chairman of the national commission for the training of higher education teachers (Algeria); 08/2016 - 06/2017: Director of Studies, the Minister's advisor of Higher Education (Algeria); 2012 - 2016: Rector of Mohand Akli Oulhadj University — Bouira (Algeria); 2000 - 2012: Dean of the Faculty of Science at University of Boumerdes (Algeria); 07/1998 - 09/2000: Vice-Rector of Mhamed Bougara University - Boumerdes (Algeria); 1990 - 1993: Head of department of geophysics and random phenomena (National Institute of Hydrocarbons and Chemistry INH)— Boumerdes (Algeria); 1987 - 1990: Head of department of physics and mathematics - INH (Algeria). In 1988 he founded the laboratory of Physics of the Earth - INH (Algeria).

== Publications ==
Baddari has been author of numerous scientific publications in field of physics and mathematics, such as:

=== Scientific papers ===
- Baddari K, Sobolev Guennadi A, Frolov Anatoly D (1988) Complex failure precursors of large scale rock bloks (In Russian). Dokladi Academy of Sciences USSR, 299, 5, 1087-1092.
- Baddari K, Sobolev Guennadi A, Frolov Anatoly D (1996) Similarity in seismic precursors at different scales. C.R Acad. Sc. Paris, t323, série IIa ? 755-762
- Baddari K, Djarfour N, Aïfa T, Ferahtia J (2010) Acoustic impedance inversion by feedback artificial neural network. Journal of Petroleum Science and Engineering 71 106–111.
- Baddari K, Sobolev Guennadi A, Frolov Anatoli D, Ponomarev Alexander V (1999) An integrated study of physical precursors of failure in relation with earthquake prediction, using large scale rock blocks. Annali Di Geofisica Vol. 42, N°5, 771-787
- Djarfour N, Aïfa T, Baddari K, Mihoubi A, Ferahtia J (2008) Application of feedback connection artificial neural network to seismic data filtering. C. R. Geoscience 340 335–344.
- Ferahtia J, Djarfour N, Baddari K, Guérin R (2009) Application of signal dependent rank-order mean filter to the removal of noise spikes from 2D electrical resistivity imaging data. Near Surface Geophysics 159-169.
- Saad Saoud L, Rahmoune F, Tourtchine V, Baddari K (2013) Complex-valued forecasting of the global solar irradiation. J. Renewable and Sustainable Energy 5, 043124.
- Baddari, Kamel; Frolov, Anatoly D.; Tourtchine, Victor; Rahmoune, Fayçal; Makdeche, Said (2015). "Effect of Stress-Strain Conditions on Physical Precursors and Failure Stages Development in Rock Samples". Acta Geophysica. 63 (1): 62–102. Bibcode:2015AcGeo..63...62B. doi:10.2478/s11600-014-0206-9. S2CID 129228813.
- Baddari, Kamel; Frolov, Anatoly D.; Tourtchine, Victor; Makdeche, Said; Rahmoune, Fayçal (2012). "Effect of temperature on the physical precursors of rock block failure". Acta Geophysica. 60 (4): 1007–1029. Bibcode:2012AcGeo..60.1007B. doi:10.2478/s11600-012-0038-4. S2CID 140588697.
- Baddari K, Frolov Anatoly D (1997) Modeling of the fractal structure of a geophysical field. C.R Acad Sc Paris, Earth and Planetary Sciences, 325, 925-930.
- Baddari, Kamel; Makdeche, Said; Bellalem, Fouzi (2013). "Probabilistic model to forecast earthquakes in the Zemmouri (Algeria) seismoactive area on the basis of moment magnitude scale distribution functions". Acta Geophysica. 61 (1): 60–83. Bibcode:2013AcGeo..61...60B. doi:10.2478/s11600-012-0064-2. S2CID 129934223.
- Kamel Baddari; Anatoly d. Frolov (2011). "Regularities in discrete hierarchy seismo-acoustic mode in a geophysical field". Annals of Geophysics. 53 (5–6). doi:10.4401/ag-4725.
- Baddari K, Ferahtia J, Aifa T, Djarfour N (2011) Seismic noise attenuation by means of ananisotropic non-linear diffusion filter. Computers & Geosciences 37 456–463.
- Djarfour N, Ferahtia J, Babaia F, Baddari K, El-adj S, Farfour M (2014) Seismic noise filtering basedon Generalized Regression Neural Networks. Computers & Geosciences 69 1–9
- Bouchelaghem H.E, Hamadouche M, Soltani F, Baddari K (2016) Adaptive clutter-map CFAR detection in distributed sensor networks,” AEU-Int. J. Electronics Commun. 70, No. 9, 1288.
- Baouche R, Aïfa T, Baddari K (2017) Intelligent methods for predicting nuclear magnetic resonance of porosity and permeability by conventional well-logs: a case study of Saharan field. Arabian Journal of Geosciences 10:545.
- Baouche R, Aïfa T, Baddari K (2017) Intelligent methods for predicting nuclear magnetic resonance of porosity and permeability by conventional well-logs: a case study of Saharan field. Arabian Journal of Geosciences 10:545.
- Baouche R, Baddari K (2017) Prediction of permeability and porosity from well log data using the nonparametric regression with multivariate analysis and neural network, Hassi R’Mel Field, Algeria. Egyptian Journal of Petroleum 26, 7763-778.
- Bouchelaghem H. E, Hamadouche M, Soltani F, Baddari K (2019) Distributed Clutter-Map Constant False Alarm Rate Detection Using Fuzzy Fusion Rules (2019) Radioelectronics and Communications Systems, Vol. 62, No. 1, 1–5. © Allerton Press, Inc.
- I.Ali Zerrouki A, Geraud Y, Diraison M, Baddari K (2019) A Preliminary study of relationships between thermal conductivity and petrophysical parameters in Hamra Quartzites reservoir, Hassi Messaoud field (Algeria). J. African Earth Sciences, Vol 151, 461-471.
- Baddari Kamel, Aifa T., Djarfour N., Ferahtia J. (2009): Application of a radial basis function artificial neural network to seismic data inversion . Computer and Geosciences, 35, pages 2338–2344.
- Baddari Kamel, Aifa T., Djarfour N., Ferahtia J. : Acoustic impedance inversion by feedback artificial neural network – Petrol J.—Zci. Eng. 76.
- Baddari Kamel, Guerin R., Djarfour N., Ferahtia J. : Application of signal depen- dant rank-order mean filter to the removal of noise spikes from 2D electrical resistivity imaging data. Near surface geophysics, 7 (3), pages 159 – 169.
- Baddari, K., Frolov, A. D., Tourtchine, V., & Rahmoune, F. (2011). An integrated study of the dynamics of electromagnetic and acoustic regimes during failure of complex macrosystems using rock blocks. Rock Mechanics and Rock Engineering, 44(3), 269-280.
- Zerrouki, A.A, Geraud, Y, Diraison, M Baddari, K Preliminary study of relationships between thermal conductivity and petrophysical parameters in Hamra
- "A Preliminary study of relationships between thermal conductivity and petrophysical parameters in Hamra Quartzites reservoir, Hassi Messaoud field (Algeria)". Journal of African Earth Sciences.

=== Books ===
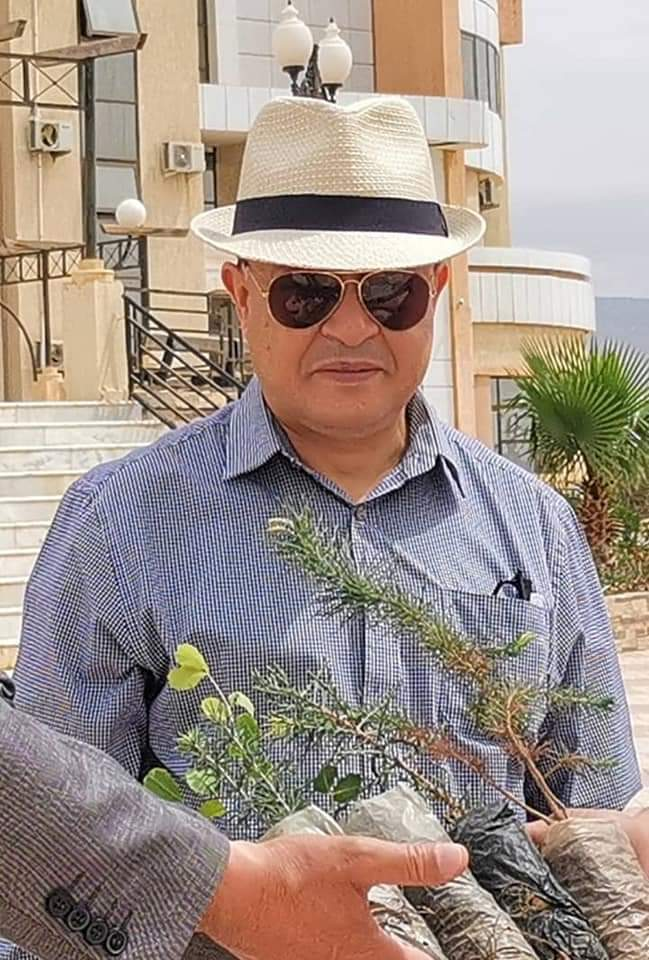
Pr Baddari during the implementation of the idea a student a tree

Kamel is the author of numerous books:

- Physique de la terre. OPU. 388 pages
- Equations de la physique mathématiques appliquées. OPU – 404 pages.
- Théorie et pratique des fonctions d’une variable complexe. OPU- 350 pages.
- Filtrage Analogique-Numérique. Dar El Djazairia Alger,
- les Seismes Et Leur Prévision. Opu Alger 2002, 355 P,
- assurance Qualité Dans L'enseignement Supérieur - Conduire Et Réussir L'autoévaluation. Opu Alger 2013, 146 P.
- Comprendre et pratiquer le LMD, OPU, 140p.
- Conduire et réussir une au- toévaluation institutionnelle – OPU – 198p.
- Indicateurs de qualité dans l’E.S. - OPU (2012)
- Bien enseigner avec le LMD – OPU – (2014)
- La recherché d’information – OPU – (2016)
