= University of Adrar =

University in Adrar, Algeria

Coordinates: 27.8907°N 0.2867°W

University Ahmed Draia of Adrar
- جامعة أدرار (Arabic); Université D'adrar (French)
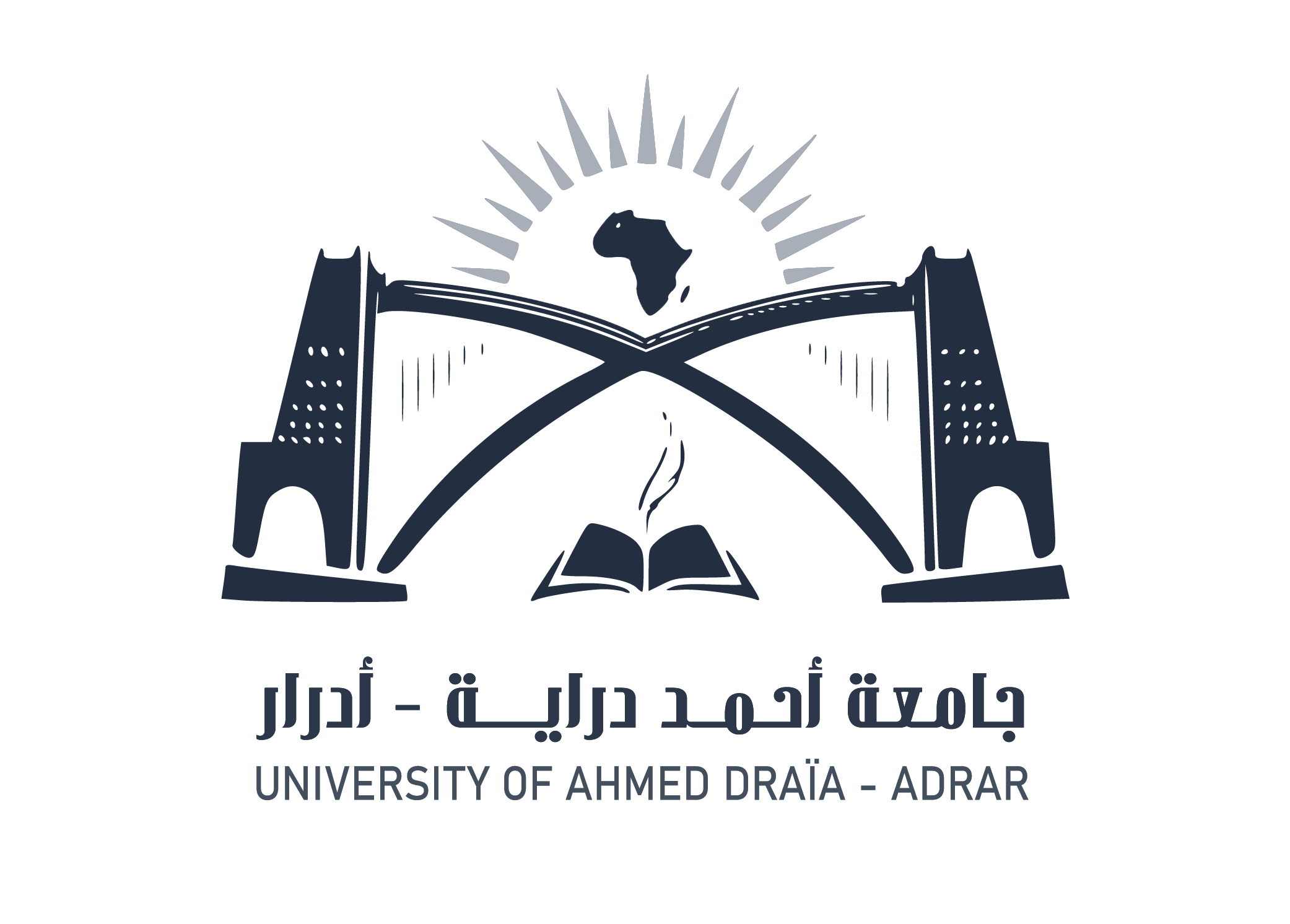
- Other name: University of Adrar
- Type: Public
- Established: 2001
- Rector: Salah Hamlil
- Location: Adrar, Adrar Province, Algeria
- Website: University of Adrar

The African University Ahmed Draia of Adrar (Arabic: الجامعة الأفريقية, French: Université D'adrar) is a university, located in Adrar in the south west of Algeria. The name The African University was given to it since the beginning because its researchers and laboratories are specialized in African studies and many of its students come from various African countries, but recently, it has been added the name of the martyr Ahmed Draïa (Arabic: دراية أحمد) because he is a national symbol who fought in the Algerian War of Independence.

== See also ==
- List of universities in Algeria
- Universities in Algeria
- Education in Africa
- University of Djelfa
- Algerian National Universities
- School in Algeria
