= University of Continuing Education (Algeria) =

Algerian University

- جامعة التكوين المتواصل (Arabic); Université de la Formation Continue (French)
- Type: Public
- Established: 1990
- Total staff: 2,389 2025
- Students: 77,500 2025
- Address: Ahmed Ouakad Street, Dali Ibrahim, Algiers, Algeria
- Website: ufc.dz

The University of Continuing Education (Arabic: جامعة التكوين المتواصل) is an Algerian university founded in 1990. Its headquarters are currently located in Dely Brahim, Algiers. It has 54 university centers distributed across the states of Algeria.

The University of Continuing Education was established under the auspices of the Ministry of Higher Education and Scientific Research by Decree No. 90-149 90–150 issued on 26 May 1990.

== History of the education system ==
To be admitted to university, a student must hold a secondary school baccalaureate certificate and pass the entrance exam to be accepted at the university or hold an equivalent foreign baccalaureate certificate, in accordance with Ministerial Decree No. 258 of 28 December 1994, specifying the conditions for admission to the University of Continuing Education.

At the end of the three-year study period, the student receives a diploma in applied university studies (in French: Diplôme d'accès aux études universitaires) (DEUA), in accordance with Executive Decree No. 90-219 of 21 July 1990.

In 2017, Ministerial Resolution No. 1022 was issued on 23 October of the same year, making a baccalaureate degree or its equivalent a requirement for university admission. This resolution also allowed the university to qualify according to the L.M.D. system to train students to obtain bachelor's and master's degrees remotely, while continuing to train regularly enrolled students until they obtain a degree in applied university studies.

The L.M.D. system has been put into effect in the 2020/2021 academic year.

== Current study pattern ==
The study is conducted via the Moodle learning platform. The university administration provides each student with a username and password to access the university's website.

Students receive a set of lessons tailored to their specialization. In addition, in-person classes are organized and scheduled (usually on weekends or evenings) for review and guidance. Tests and assignments (homework, essays) are conducted via the learning platform, and in-person exams are held at the end of each semester.

After a student completes each semester, they submit a graduation thesis addressing an academic or applied topic. This thesis is discussed by a committee. Upon successful completion, the student is awarded a bachelor's or master's degree (depending on the degree program). This degree is equivalent to that of a regular university and allows them to participate in the doctoral competition.

== See also ==
- List of universities in Algeria
