= University of Setif 2 =

University in Constantine, Algeria

- جامعة سطيف 2 - محمد لمين دباغين (Arabic); Université Sétif 2 - Mohamed Lamine Debaghine (French)
- Type: Public
- Established: November 28, 2011
- Location: Sétif, Algeria; 36.212°N 5.452°E
- Colors
- Website: www.univ-setif2.dz

The University of Setif 2, (Arabic: جامعة سطيف 2), also known as University of Mohamed Lamine Debaghine, is a public university, located in Sétif, Algeria, established in November 2011.

The university was established in accordance with Executive Decree No. 11-404 dated November 28, 2011.

== Faculties ==
- Faculty of Social and Human Sciences
- Faculty of Law and Political Sciences
- Faculty of Letters and Languages

== See also ==
- List of universities in Algeria
- Mohamed Lamine Debaghine
- University of Setif 1

== University Rankings links ==
- University of Setif 2 on THE Rankings
- University of Setif 2 on Uniranks
