= Abdelbaki Benziane =

Algerian politician

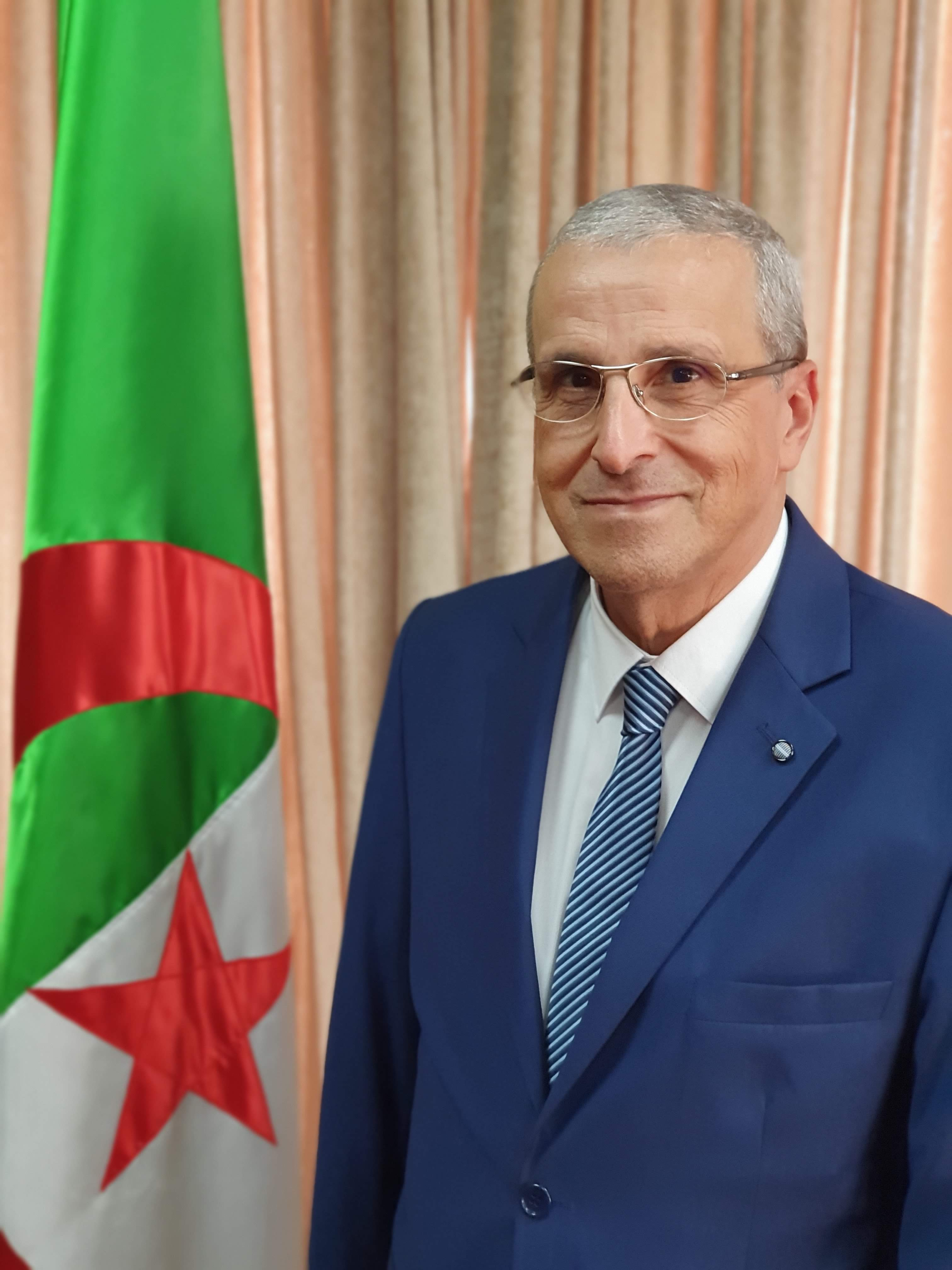

Minister of Higher Education and Scientific Research
- In office June 25, 2020 – 9 September 2022
- President: Abdelmadjid Tebboune
- Prime Minister: Abdelaziz Djerad; Aymen Benabderrahmane
- Succeeded by: Kamel Bidari

Personal details
- Born: December 12, 1958 (age 67)

Abdelbaki Benziane (Arabic:وزارة التعليم العالي والبحث العلمي) (born 12 December 1958 in Algiers, Algeria) is an Algerian politician. Previously he had served as the Minister of Higher Education and Scientific Research from June 25, 2020 until 9 September 2022.

== Background ==
Abdelbaki Benziane is a professor in Research field Management Sciences. Among his duties his works mainly covered the fields of University Governance, Human Resources Management, Public Management, Energy Management, Tourism Management.

== Career ==
- 33 years of experience in higher education in management sciences.
- 32 years of experience in the management of higher education structures (Institute, University, University Academy, Higher School, Regional Conference of Universities,...).
- Member of the Bureau of several international research networks.
- International expert in evaluation and governance.
- Member of National Commissions for Higher Education and Research.
- Project leader of several CNEPRU research projects related to governance and evaluation.
