= Mustapha Yahi =

Algerian politician (born 1963)

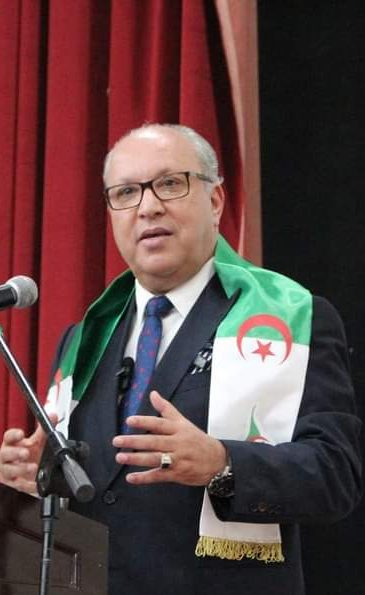
- Mustapha Yahi

The Secretary-General of the Democratic National Rally
- Incumbent
- Assumed office 14 October 2023

Personal details
- Born: July 1, 1963 (age 62) Barika
- Party: National Democratic Rally party
- Profession: Professor

Mustapha Yahi (born 1 July 1963) is an Algerian politician and university professor, the Secretary General of the National Democratic Rally party since 14 October 2023, and the president of M'Hamed Bougara University in Boumerdès. He is married and has two children.
