= Higher School of Social Security =

Algerian Grande école

Coordinates: 36°45′18″N 2°59′51″E

- المدرسة العليا للضمان الإجتماعي (Arabic); École Supérieure de la Sécurité Sociale (French)
- Type: Public
- Established: 2012
- Location: Street 5 July, Ben Aknoun, Algeria
- Colors
- Website: www.esss.dz

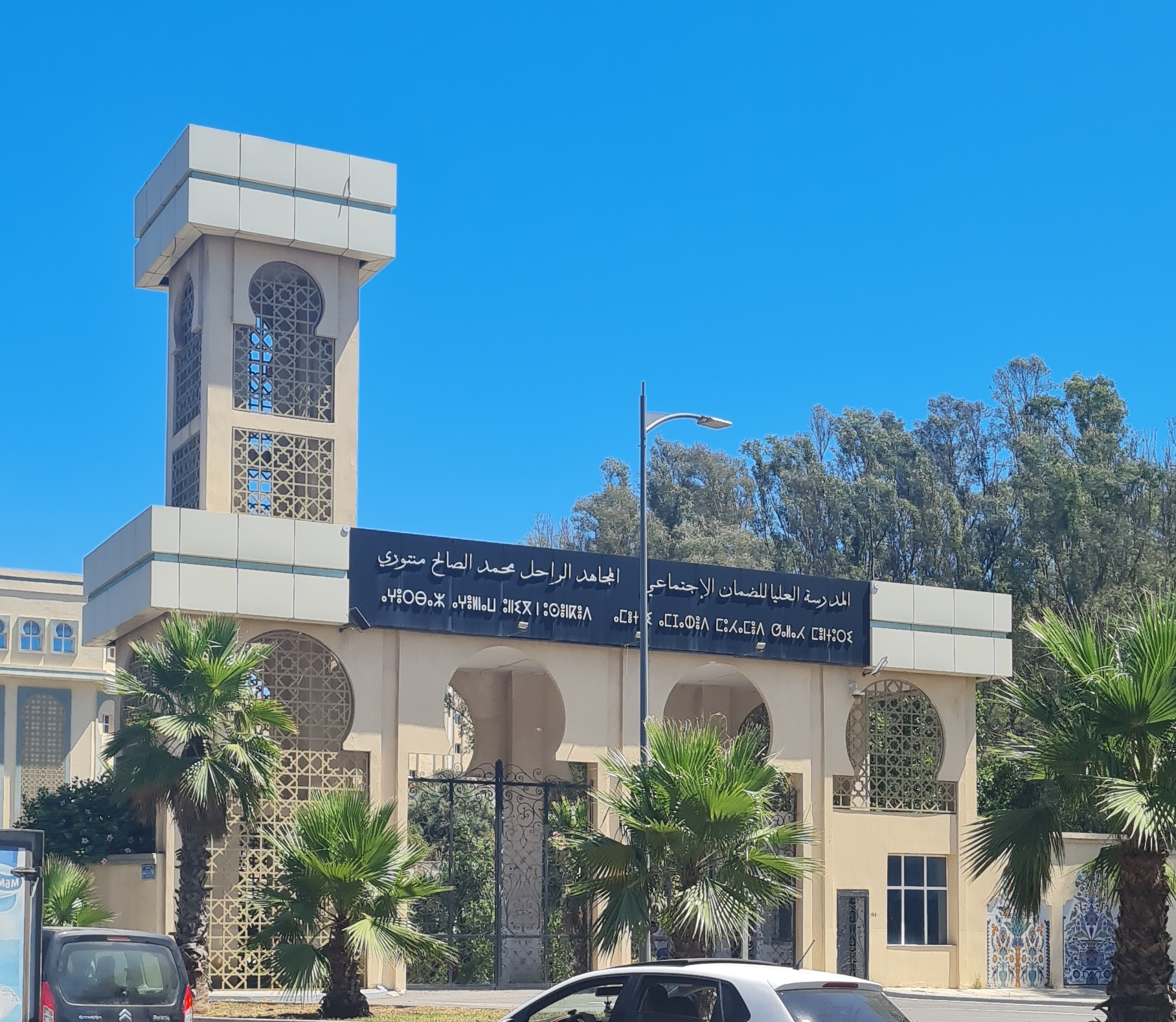
Building of the Higher School of Social Security.

The Higher School of Social Security (Arabic: المدرسة العليا للضمان الإجتماعي) is an Algerian Grande école founded in 2012 and located in Ben Aknoun, Algiers.

The Grande école was established by Decree No. 12-158 issued on 1 April 2012.

It is the only international Grande école in Africa specializing in social security, through an agreement between the Government of the People's Democratic Republic of Algeria and the International Labor Organization signed in Geneva 2013, and ratified by Presidential Decree No. 14-173 on 2 June 2014.

== See also ==
- List of universities in Algeria
- Grande école
