= University of Mila =

- جامعة المجاهد عبد الحفيظ بوالصوف - ميلة (Arabic); Université AbdelHafid Boussouf - Mila (French)
- Type: Public
- Established: 2008
- Location: Mila, Algeria
- Website: www.univ-mila.dz

The University of Mila, (Arabic: جامعة ميلة), also known as University of AbdelHafid Boussouf, is a public university located in Mila, Algeria.

It was established in July 2008 as a university center by virtue of Executive Decree 08-204 issued on July 9, 2008, and in 2014 it was named after AbdelHafid Boussouf.

In 2025 it became a university by virtue of Executive Decree 25-266 issued on October 7, 2025.

== Faculties ==
- Faculty of Science and Technology.
- Faculty of Mathematics and Computer Science.
- Faculty of Natural and Life Sciences.
- Faculty of Economics, Business, and Management.
- Faculty of Arts and Languages.
- Faculty of Law.
- Annex of the École Normale Supérieure.

== See also ==
- List of universities in Algeria
- AbdelHafid Boussouf

== University Rankings links ==
- University of Mila on THE Rankings
- University of Mila on QS World University Rankings
