= University of Guelma =

Algerian university

Coordinates: 36.4485°N 7.4195°E

8 Mai 1945 - Guelma University
- جامعة 8 ماي 1945–قالمة
- Former names: Guelma University
- Type: Public
- Established: 1986
- Rector: Prof. Saleh Ellagoune
- Academic staff: 553
- Administrative staff: 812
- Students: 17530
- Undergraduates: 17004
- Postgraduates: 526
- Location: Guelma, Algeria
- Website: www.univ-guelma.dz

8 Mai 1945 - Guelma University (Arabic: جامعة 8 ماي 1945 - قالمة), also called Guelma University, is located in Guelma, Algeria, on the north eastern coast of Algeria.

== General ==
The University 8 Mai 1945 Guelma has 7 faculties:

- Faculty of Science and Technology,
- Faculty of Mathematics, Computer Science and sciences of matter,
- Faculty of Economics and Business,
- Faculty of Natural and Life Sciences and Earth and Universe Sciences (SNVSTU),
- Faculty of Law and Political Science,
- Faculty of Letters and Languages,
- Faculty of human and social sciences.

It also brings together 23 research laboratories.

It has 4 vice rectorates:

- Vice rectorate of higher education for the first and second cycles, continuing education and diplomas, and graduation
- Vice Rectorate of Postgraduate Training, University Habilitation, Scientific Research and Post-Graduation Training
- Vice rectorate of external relations, cooperation, animation, communication and scientific events
- Vice Rectorate of Development, Foresight and Guidance

== Numbers ==
The student body of the University 8 Mai 1945 - Guelma during the university year 2020-2021 is: 17,530 students distributed as follows:

- Graduation: (17004)
- post-graduation: (526)

The teaching staff during the 2020-2021 university year is broken down by grade as follows:

Grade	Number
Professors	143
Lecturers A	192
Lecturers B	279
Assistant Masters A	234
Assistant Masters B	19
Assistant	01
Associate teachers	02

The University 8 Mai 1945 -Guelma also has 553 employees (ATS) and 259 contractual employees.

== See also ==
- List of universities in Algeria
