= Mohamed Boudiaf University of M'Sila =

Algerian public educational institution

- جامعة محمد بوضياف مسيلة – Université Mohamed Boudiaf de M'Sila
- Type: Public university
- Established: 1985
- Rector: Pr Mohamed Taher Helilat
- Faculty: 1402 (in 2025)
- Students: 28385 (in 2025)
- Location: M'Sila, Algeria; 35.701917°N 4.546967°E
- Language: Arabic and French
- Website: www.univ-msila.dz

The Mohamed Boudiaf University of M'Sila is a public university in M'Sila, Algeria.

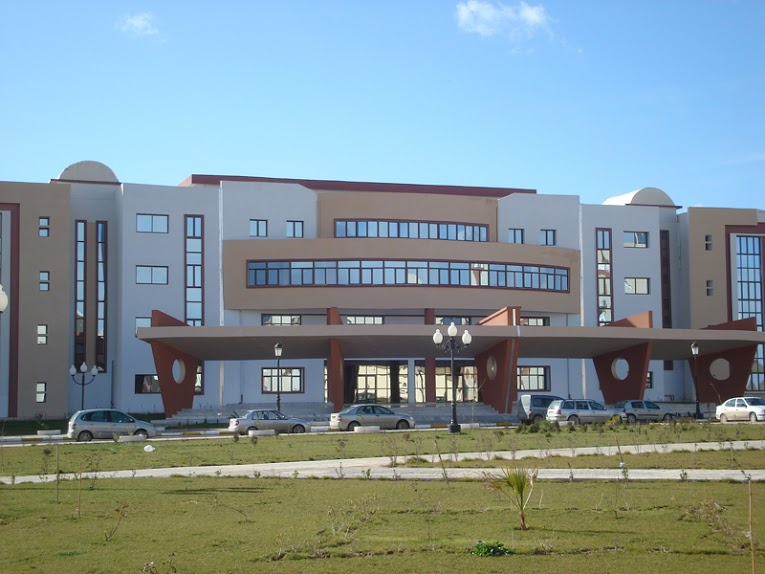
Faculty of Technology

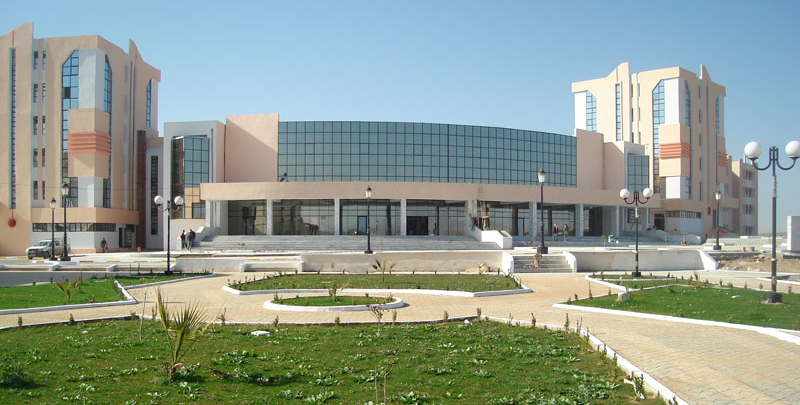
Faculty of Mathematics and Computer Science

== History ==
The institution began in 1985 with the opening of a higher education institute in mechanics, followed in 1989 by institutes of civil engineering and urban management. In 1992, it became a university center, and in 2001 achieved university status with four faculties and 23 departments. According to university statistics for the year 2013, the number of faculties and institutes increased to 7 and 2, respectively. The number of research laboratories within the institution, approved by the Ministry of Higher Education and Scientific Research, increased from 7 to 23 research laboratories.

Mohamed Boudiaf University of M'Sila can accommodate 36,217 students and has 10,000 dormitory beds available.

The university is named after Mohamed Boudiaf.

== Organization ==
=== Faculties and Institutes ===
Mohamed Boudiaf University of M'Sila consists of seven faculties and two institutes:

- Faculty of Science
- Faculty of Mathematics and Computer Science
- Faculty of Technology
- Faculty of Economics and Management
- Faculty of Letters and Languages
- Faculty of Law and Political Science
- Faculty of Humanities and Social Sciences
- of Sciences and Techniques of Physical and Sports Activities – University of M'sila

=== Scientific Research ===
Since the early 2000s, Mohamed Boudiaf University of M'Sila has been developing scientific research projects in various fields (mathematics, physics, biology, computer science, literature, etc.).

==== Research Laboratories ====
The Mohamed Boudiaf University of M'Sila has the following research laboratories:

- Laboratory of Motor Learning and Control (LACM)
- Laboratory of Theoretical and Practical Linguistic Studies (LELTP)
- Laboratory of Commercial Science Studies (LESC)
- Life Skills Laboratory (LLS)
- Algerian Poetics Laboratory
- Laboratory of Adapted Physical and Sports Activities Programs
- Laboratory of Human Resource Planning and Performance Improvement
- Laboratory of New Political Science Research
- Laboratory of Economic Strategies and Policies in Algeria
- Laboratory of Studies and Research on the Algerian Revolution
- Laboratory of Health and Developmental Psychology
- Laboratory of Functional Analysis and Geometry of Spaces
- Laboratory of Signal and Systems Analysis
- Laboratory of Communication and Society
- Laboratory of Geomaterials Development (LDGM)
- Laboratory of History, Sociology, and Social and Economic Change Studies (LEHSCSE)
- Laboratory of Inorganic Materials
- Laboratory of Materials and Structural Mechanics
- Laboratory of Pure and Applied Mathematics (LMPA)
- Laboratory of Physics and Chemistry of Materials
- Laboratory of Organic Synthesis and Phytochemistry
- Laboratory of Urban Techniques and Environment
- Laboratory of Electrical Engineering

=== Central Library ===
The central library includes the following services:

- Acquisition service
- Processing service
- Bibliographic research service
- Orientation service
