= University of Oum El Bouaghi =

University in the Oum El Bouaghi Province, Algeria

Coordinates: 35.880°N 7.091°E

Larbi Ben M'hidi University of Oum El Bouaghi
- جامعة أم البواقي; University of Oum El Bouaghi
- Type: Public
- Established: 2001
- Location: Oum El Bouaghi, Oum El Bouaghi Province, Algeria
- Website: www.univ-oeb.dz

University of Oum El Bouaghi (Arabic: جامعة أم البواقي) or Larbi Ben M'hidi University of Oum El Bouaghi (Arabic: جامعةالعربي بن مهيدي بأم البواقي, is a university located in Algeria in the Oum El Bouaghi Province. It was established in 2013.

== See also ==
- List of universities in Algeria
