= National Institute of Paramedical (Constantine) =

Algerian institute

National Institute of Paramedical Constantine
- المعهد الوطني للتكوين العالي شبه طبي - قسنطينة (Arabic); Institut National De Formation Superieure Paramédical Constantine (French)
- Type: Public
- Established: 1970
- Address: Constantine, Algeria

National Institute of Paramedical Constantine (Arabic: المعهد الوطني للتكوين العالي شبه طبي - قسنطينة) is an Algerian institute founded in 1970.

The institute was established in October 1970 and officially started in September 1976 with the start of the academic year 1976-1977 under the name of the Institute of Public Health Technology of Constantine.

Pursuant to Executive Decree No. 99-155 of July 1999, this institute was dissolved and its functions transferred to the Paramedical School of Constantine, established by Decree No. 73-79 of June 5, 1973.

In February 2011, the school was transformed into the National Institute of Paramedical pursuant to Executive Decree No. 11-92 of February 24, 2011.

== Specializations available at the institute ==
- Public Health Nurse
- Public Health Laboratory Technician
- Medical Imaging Equipment Operator
- Physiotherapist
- Public Health Social Worker
- Public Health Midwife
- Nutritionist
- Medical Assistant Specializing in Anesthesia and Resuscitation
- Pharmacy Instructor

== See also ==
- List of universities in Algeria
