= University of Djelfa =

- جــامــــــعة الجلفة; Université de Djelfa
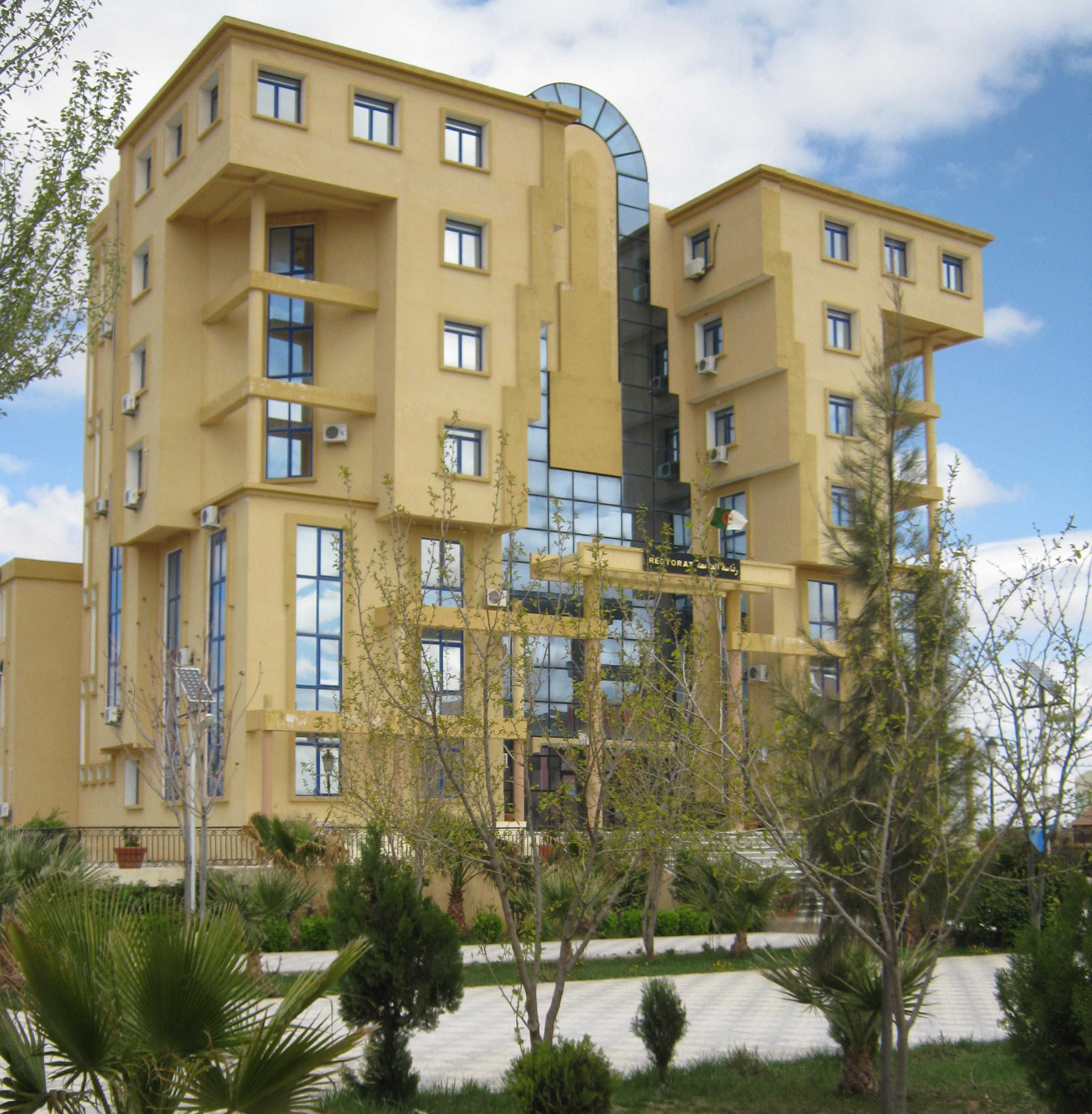
- Type: Public
- Established: 1990
- Endowment: Free
- Students: 22000
- Location: Djelfa, Djelfa, Algeria
- Website: http://www.univ-djelfa.dz/

University of Djelfa (Arabic: جامعة الجلفة, French: Université de Djelfa) is a university located in Djelfa, Algeria. Under President Abdelaziz Bouteflika, it was upgraded from a university center to a university on October 13, 2008.

== See also ==
- University of Djelfa (Arabic)
- List of universities in Algeria
- Education in Algeria
- List of Universities in Africa
