= Higher National School of Management =

Algerian Grande école

Coordinates: 36.6419°N 2.7904°E

- المدرسة الوطنية العليا للمناجمت (Arabic); École nationale supérieure de management (French)
- Type: Public
- Established: 2008
- Location: Koléa, Algeria
- Website: www.ensmanagement.dz

The Higher National School of Management (ENSM) (Arabic: المدرسة الوطنية العليا للمناجمنت) (French: École nationale supérieure de management) is a public Grande école located in Koléa, Algeria, established in 2008.

== See also ==
- List of universities in Algeria
