= Higher School of Magistracy (Algeria) =

Public school in Koléa,Tipaza

Coordinates: 36°38′38″N 2°44′41″E

The Higher School of Magistracy
- المدرسة العليا للقضاء (Arabic)
- Type: Public
- Established: 1989
- Location: Koléa, Tipaza, Algeria
- Website: www.esm.dz

The Higher School of Magistracy (Arabic: المدرسة العليا للقضاء) is a public school of higher learning under the supervision of the Ministry of Justice, located in Koléa, Tipaza, established in 1989.

== History ==
The National Institute of Judiciary was established by the basic law of the judiciary No. 89-21 dated December 12, 1989, for the training of judges and their assistant staff and to improve their level. It was established by executive decree No. 90-139 dated May 19, 1990, concerning the organization of the National Institute of Judiciary, its operation, and the rights and duties of students.

The National Institute of Judiciary was transformed into a Higher School of Magistracy by organic law No. 04-11 September 6, 2004, which includes the basic law of the judiciary. Executive decree No. 05-303 of August 20, 2005, regulated its organization, operation, admission conditions, study system, and the rights and duties of student judges.

The School was reorganized by executive decree No. 16-159 of May 30, 2016, which specifies the organization, operation, admission conditions, study system, and the rights and duties of student judges.

The first intake joined the school in 1990, initially located in Dar El Beida, Then it was transferred to the city of Bouzareah in the year... and then to El Biar in 1999. Its new headquarters were inaugurated on December 15, 2020, in Kolea, in the wilaya of Tipaza, west of Algiers, on an area of 12.5 hectares.

Since its establishment in 1992, the School has graduated 26 promotions totaling 5995 judges.

== See also ==
- List of universities in Algeria
