= University of Chlef =

University in Chlef, Algeria

- جامعة الشلف; University of Chlef
- Type: Public
- Established: 2001
- Location: Chlef, Chlef Province, Algeria
- Website: University of Chlef

The University of Chlef (Arabic: جامعة الشلف), is a university in Algeria in the province of Chlef. It was established in 2001 by grouping several national institutes of higher education into one center, and named after the Algerian martyr Hassiba Benbouali. The university currently has almost 26,000 students enrolled over nine faculties, with 75 specialties in the first cycle (LMD) and nearly 112 specialties at the masters level. The teaching staff consists of 1,083 teachers and the personal staff consists of 1,195 functionaries.

== History ==
=== Foundation ===
The university began during the academic year 1983/1984 with the foundation of the national institute of higher education in civil engineering which enrolled 144 registered students. During the academic year 1986/1987 two new national institutes of higher education - hydraulics and agronomy - were officially opened. Since 1988 other formation courses have been opened, including:

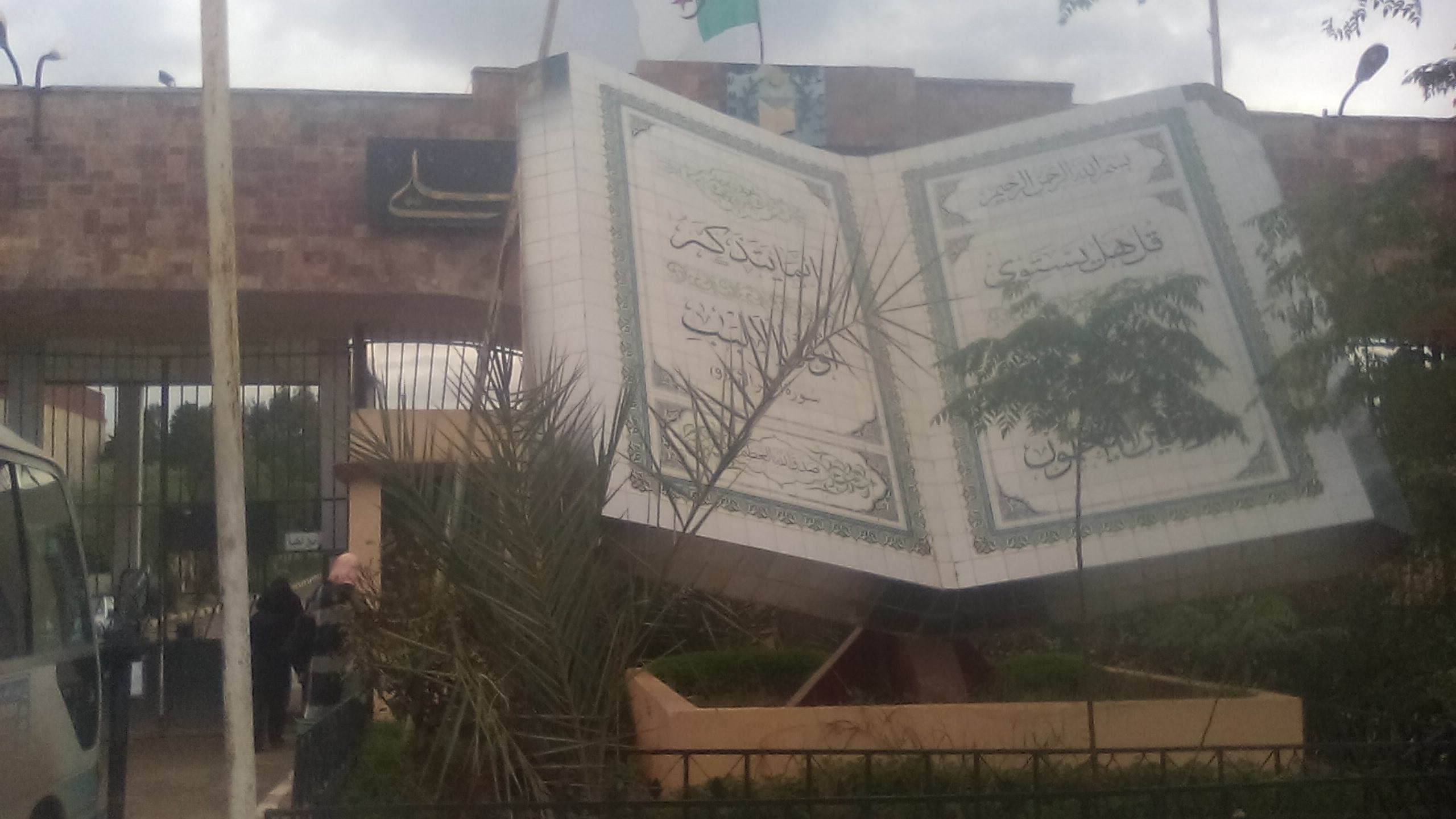
Uhbchlef (ancient)

- mechanical engineering
- electronics
- business informatics
- accounting and taxation

In 1992 the INES of Chlef were grouped under the governance of a single directorate by the creation of the university center of Chlef, an opportunity that has opened up others sectors such as:

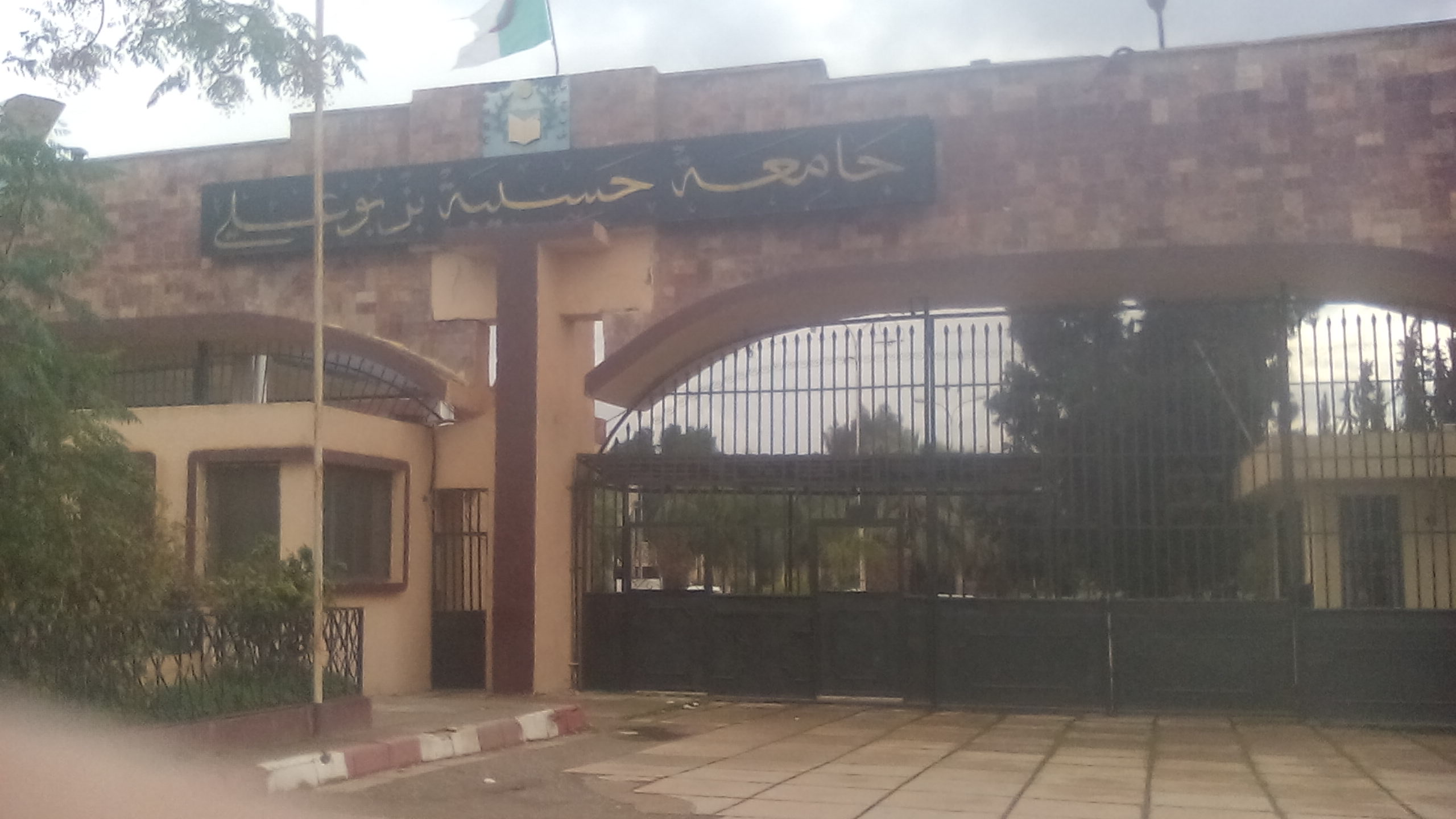

- Economic science
- Management science
- Legal and administrative science
- Arabic literature
- Process engineering
- Data processing
- Science of nature and life
- Biology

In 2001 the university center became a university that consisted of three faculties:

- Faculty of Science and Engineering Science
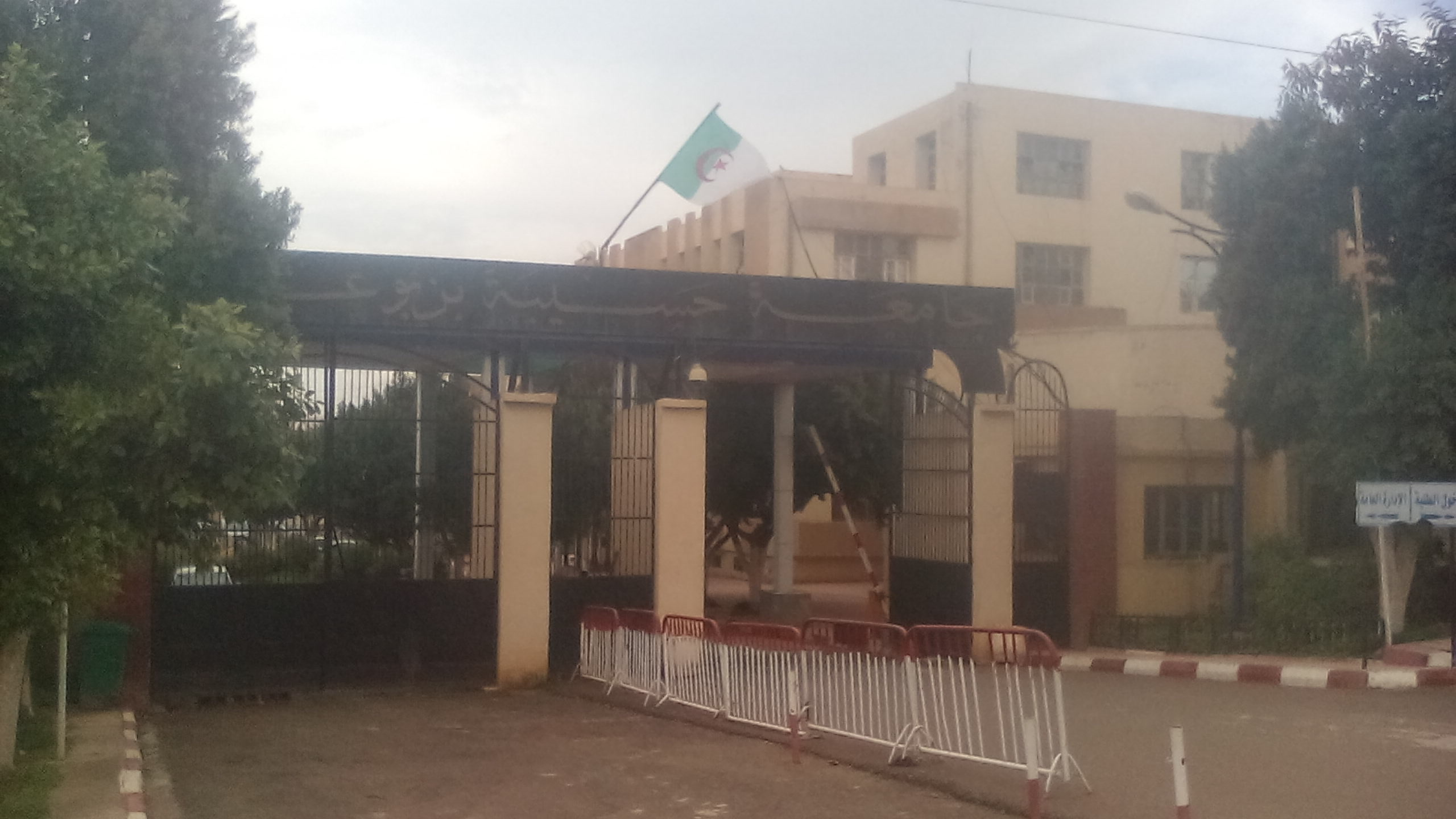
  Uhbc hay Salem
- Faculty of Earth Sciences and Agricultural Science
- Faculty of Human Sciences and Social Science

In 2006 Chlef was restructured with five facilities and one institute:

- Faculty of Science and Engineering Science
- Faculties of Agricultural Sciences and Biological Sciences
- Faculty of Economic Science and Management Science
- Faculty of Legal and Administrative Science
- Faculty of Letters and Languages
- Institute of Physical Education and Sports

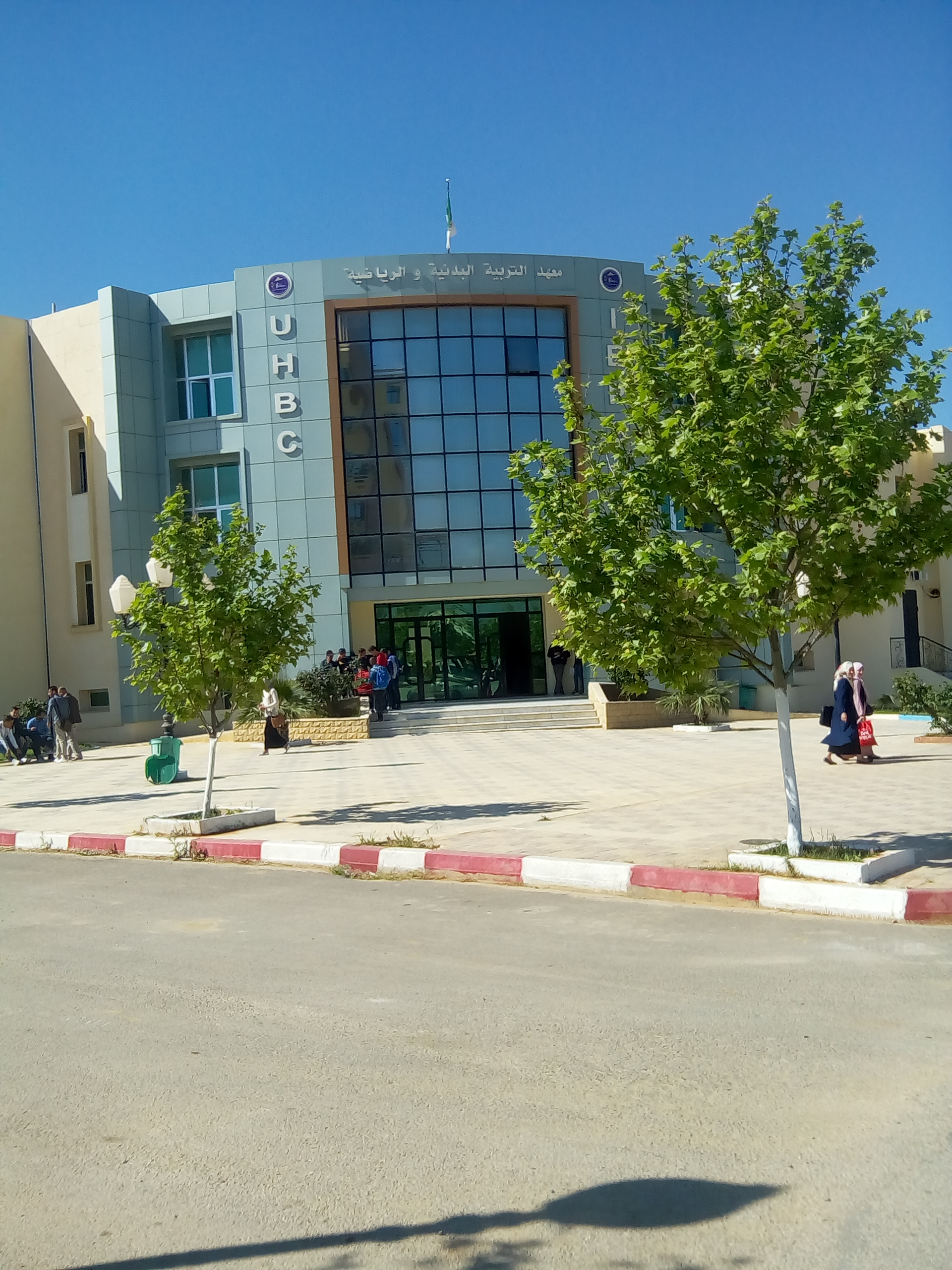

In the academic year 2007/2008 the university began to offer degrees in two new academic fields:

- Law and political science
- Human science

In 2008/2009 the university began to offer masters-level degrees in several specialties:

- Science and technology
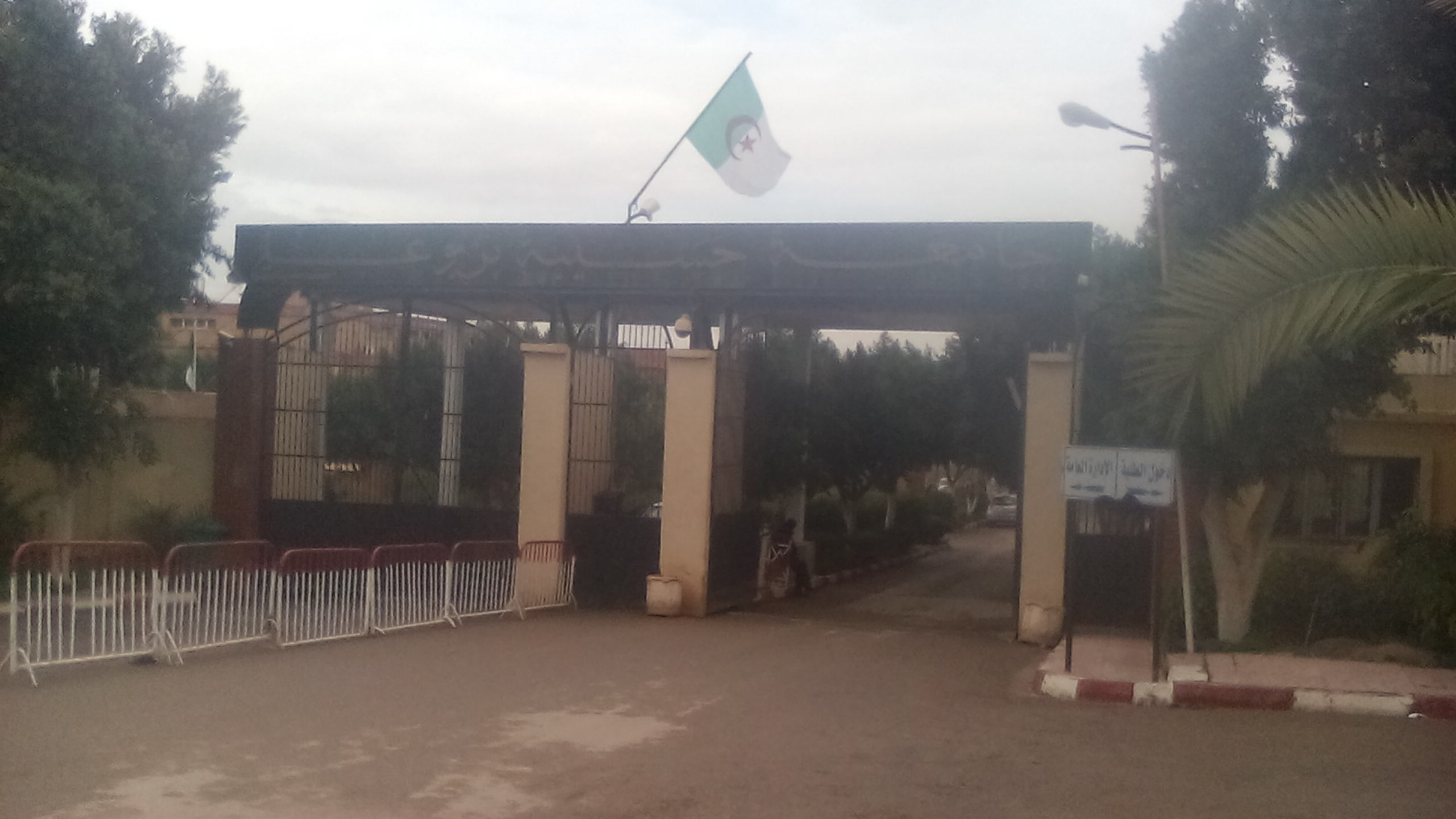
  Uhbc 2
- Process engineering
- Science of nature and life
- Reproductive biology
- Water and environment
- Human nutrition
- Food science

The university's masters training has benefited from various options in the following areas:

- Science and technology.
- Science of nature and life.
- Economic science, management and commercial science.
- Science and technology of physical and sports activities.

It should also be pointed out that the academic year 2010/2011 saw the generalization of the LMD system at the level of all faculties as well as the restructuring of the university into seven faculties and two institutes:

- Faculty of technology.
- Faculty of science.
- Faculty of letters and languages.
- Faculty of human and social science.
- Faculty of Civil Engineering and Architecture.
- Faculty of economic science, commercial and management science.
- Faculty of law and political science.
- Institute of agronomic science.
- Institute of physical education and sports.

UHBC also saw the creation of the 4th Vice-Rectorate in charge of postgraduate studies, university habilitation, scientific research and post-graduation higher education, which gave it the rank of (A). With the start of the 2016/2017 academic year UHBC brought together nine faculties and under one institute:

- Faculty of Technology.
- Faculty of Exact Sciences and Computer Science
- Faculty of Arts and Arts
- Faculty of Foreign Languages.
- Faculty of Humanities and Social Sciences.
- Faculty of Civil Engineering and Architecture.
- Faculty of Economics, Business and Management Sciences.
- Faculty of Rights and Political Sciences.
- Faculty of Science of Nature and Life.
- Institute of Physical Education and Sports.

=== See also ===
- List of universities in Algeria
