= University of Biskra =

University in Biskra, Algeria

Coordinates: 34.8464°N 5.7504°E

University of Mohamed Khider Biskra
- جامعة محمد خيضر بسكرة
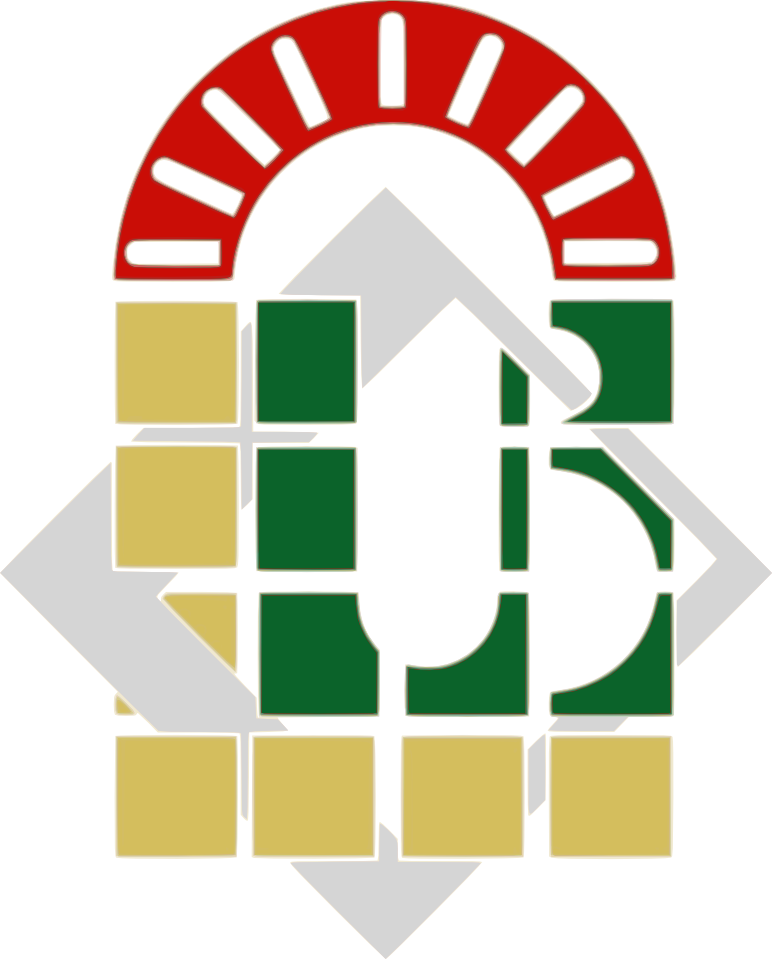
- Seal of the University of Biskra
- Type: Public Non-profit University
- Established: 1984
- Rector: Pr. Ahmed Boutarfaia
- Students: 30,000-34,999
- Location: BP 145 RP, Biskra, 07000, Algeria
- Website: univ-biskra.dz

The University of Mohamed Khider Biskra (Arabic: جامعة محمد خيضر بسكرة, French: Université Mohamed Khider Biskra, Acronym UMKB) is one of the 106 institutions of higher education in Algeria, located in the state of Biskra. Established in 1983, the University of Mohamed Khider Biskra is a non-profit public higher education institution located in the urban setting of the medium-sized city of Biskra (population range of 500,000-1,000,000 inhabitants). Officially accredited and/or recognized by the Ministry of Higher Education and Scientific Research, the University of Mohamed Khider Biskra (UMKB) is a very large (uniRank enrollment range: 30,000-34,999 students) coeducational higher education institution, it offers courses and programs leading to officially recognized higher education degrees such as bachelor's degrees, master's degrees, doctorate degrees in several areas of study. The university has its origins in three national institutes that were administratively, pedagogically, and financially autonomous: National Institute of Hydraulics, National Institute of Architecture, National Institute of Electrotechnics. These three institutes became a university center in 1992, the university center became the Mohamed Khider University of Biskra in 1998, now the university has six faculties.

== Statistics ==
The number of students in the University of Mohamed Khider Biskra for the academic year 2017/2018 reached 32,582 students in the first, second, and third phases, including 230 foreign students from 11 nationalities. The university has 09 libraries, with a capacity for 6,860 seats. The libraries contain 532,923 copies of 86726 books and articles in various scientific, technological, social, and literary specialties. As for the end of the study, master's, and doctoral theses, they reached 11860 titles. The number of articles published in international magazines as of August 2017 reached 1781 articles (Scopus) of class B. The university has 34 international agreements with universities and research institutions with different countries, while at the national level there are 38 agreements with universities and university centers and scientific research laboratories in addition to national institutions. According to UniRank the national rank of University of Mohamed Khider Biskra is 05 and the international rank is 5093.

== Historical Landmarks of Mohamed Khider Biskra University ==
=== Executive Decrees Establishing the University of Biskra ===
==== First Stage: The National Institutes (1984-1992) ====
The University of Biskra has its origins in three national institutes that were administratively, pedagogically and financially autonomous.

- National Institute of Hydraulics (Decree No. 254-84, of 18/08/1984).
- National Institute of Architecture (decree n ° 253–84, of 05/08/1984).
- National Institute of Electrotechnics (decree n °: 169–86, of 18/08/1986).

==== Second Stage: The University Center (1992-1998) ====
These three institutes became a university center by decree: 295–92, of 07/07/1992. Since 1992, other institutes have emerged:

- Institute of Exact Sciences.
- Institute of Civil Engineering.
- Institute of Economics.
- Institute of Electronics.
- Institute of Arabic Literature.
- Institute of Sociology.

==== Third Stage: The university (since 1998) ====
Decree n ° 219–98, of: 07.07.1998 transforms the University Center into a University of 03 faculties. Executive Decree 255-04 of 24/08/2004: amending Executive Decree 219-98 of 07/07/1998, organizes the University of Biskra in four (04) faculties:

- Faculty of Science and Engineering.
- Faculty of Arts, Humanities and Social Sciences.
- Faculty of Law and Political Science.
- Faculty of Economics and Management.

==== The Current Situation ====
Following the executive decree n ° 90-09 dated: 17/02/2009, and at the Executive Decree 129–14, the university counts today six (06) faculties and one (01) institute:

- Faculty of the exact sciences, natural and life sciences.
- Faculty of Humanities and Social Sciences.
- Faculty of Law and Political Science.
- Faculty of Economic, Commercial and Management Sciences.
- Faculty of Science and Technology.
- Faculty of Arts and Languages.
- Institute of Sciences and Techniques of Physical Activities and Sports (ISTAPS).

After the modification of the article n ° 4 of the executive decree n ° 219–98, the university, in addition to the general secretariat and the central library, includes 04 vice rectorate:

- Vice Rectorate in charge of higher education at the undergraduate and graduate level, continued education and diplomas, and graduate training.
- Vice-Rectorate in charge of postgraduate training, university and scientific research, and postgraduate higher education.
- Vice Rectorate for External Relations, Cooperation, Animation and Communication, and Scientific Events.
- Vice Rectorate in charge of Planning and Guidance.

=== Rectors of The University of Biskra (from 1983 to date) ===
- BARKAT Morad
- BAHRI Mebarek
- SAKER Mohamed Larbi
- REZGUI Ali
- DJEDI Noureddine
- SELATNIA Belkacem
- BOUTARFAIA Ahmed Current rector.

== Faculties / Institute ==
=== Faculty of Economic, Commercial and Management Sciences ===
The opening of the field of training in economics, business, and management at the University of Biskra dates back to 1991. During this period, the college succeeded in raising many challenges, especially pedagogical and administrative framing. This allowed the attainment of very professional results in terms of training in graduation and post-graduation with a modest percentage in the field of scientific research and community service. The college has reached a new stage by appointing all its users, professors and students to raise other challenges that are consistent with what was stated in the institution's project approved in 2018, which does not exclude any field of good governance to improve pedagogical performance, scientific research and other aspects of university life.

=== Faculty of The Exact Sciences, Natural, and Life Sciences ===
The Faculty of Exact, Natural and Life Sciences at Mohamed Khider University in Biskra is the result of the restructuring of the Faculty of Engineering Sciences and Sciences under Executive Decree 90-09 of 17 February 2009. Geographically, the faculty is located on two sites, the first at the Central University, and the second on the pole of El-hadjeb, it is structured in 06 pedagogical departments (mathematics, computer science, material sciences, agronomic sciences, nature and life sciences, and earth and universe sciences). These departments provide Bachelor's, Master's, and Doctorate courses within the framework of the LMD system, as well as Engineer and Magister courses in the classical system (on the way to extinction). The faculty also has 34 teaching laboratories, 23 computer rooms, and 2 libraries, It also contains nine research laboratories that contribute on the one hand to the promotion of scientific research and on the other hand to the management of thesis frameworks within the framework of accredited doctoral training courses.

=== Faculty of Science and Technology ===
The faculty is a teaching and scientific research unit in the field of science and knowledge. The faculty of sciences and technology is considered as one of the largest faculties of Mohammed KHIDER University. It was created in 2009 following executive decree N ° 90/09 for the creation of the University of Biskra published in the Official Journal of the Republic of Algeria No. 12 of 17/02/2009.

=== Faculty of Law and Political Science ===
The Faculty of Law and Economic Sciences was established by Decree No. 98-219 7 July 1998, establishing the University of Biskra. The decree was amended by Executive Decree No. 04- 255 dated 29 August 2004, where the Faculty of Law was separated from the Faculty of Economics. Political Science, and includes two sections: the Department of Law, and the Department of Political Science and International Relations.

=== Faculty of Humanities and Social Sciences ===
The Faculty of Human and Social Sciences was established under the Executive Decree No 90-09 of the 21st Safar 1430 corresponding to 17 February 2009 amending and completing the Executive Decree No 219-98 of the 13th Rabiaa the 1st 1419 corresponding to 7 July 1998 and concerning the establishment of the University of Biskra. The site of the Faculty of Human and Social Sciences is located at the University Pole of Chetma Town and comprises three Departments: the Department of Social Sciences, the Department of Human Sciences, and the Department of Physical Education and Sports.

=== Institute of Sciences and Techniques of Physical Activities and Sports (ISTAPS) ===
The Institute of Science and Techniques of Physical and Sports Activities was established at Mohamed Khayder University - Biskra - on 5 April 2014, in accordance with Executive Decree No. 14-129 5 April 2014, and supplementing the Executive Decree No. 98-219 of 7 July 1998 which includes the establishment of the University.

=== Common Services ===
- Intensive Language Teaching Center
- Center for Networks, Information and Communication Systems
- Publishing Branch
- Preventive medicine unit

== Administrations ==
=== The rectorate ===
- Pr. BOUTARFAIA Ahmed: Rector of Biskra University
- Pr. BACHIR Abdelmalik: Vice-Rector in charge of higher education at the undergraduate and graduate level, continued education, diplomas, and graduate training.
- Pr. DEBABECHE Mahmoud: Vice-Rector in charge of External Relations, Cooperation, Animation, Communication, and Scientific Events.
- Pr.ZEMMOURI Noureddine: Vice-Rector in charge of Postgraduate training, university habilitation, scientific research, and postgraduate higher education.
- Dr.BENAICHI Elhadj: Vice-Rector in charge of Development, Foresight, and Orientation.
- Mr.DJOUDI Said: Chief of staff.

=== Deans of Faculties ===
- Pr. DEBABECHE Adberraouf: Faculty of Law and Political Science.
- Dr.ROUINA Abdelhafid: Faculty of Science and Technology.
- Dr. KETIRI Brahim: Faculty of Arts and Languages.
- Pr. ATTAF Abdallah: Faculty of the exact sciences, natural and life sciences.
- Dr. MISSOUM Belkacem: Faculty of Humanities and Social Sciences.
- Dr. Djoudi Hanane: Faculty of Economic, Commercial, and Management Sciences.
- Dr. BOUAROURI Djaafar: Institute of Sciences and Techniques of Physical Activities and Sports (ISTAPS).

== See also ==
- List of universities in Algeria
- Mohamed Khider
- Pictures of the UMKB
- Teachers in the UMKB
