= University of Jijel =

University in Jijel, Algeria

Coordinates: 36°48′07″N 5°45′05″E

- جامعة جيجل (Arabic); Université de Jijel (French)
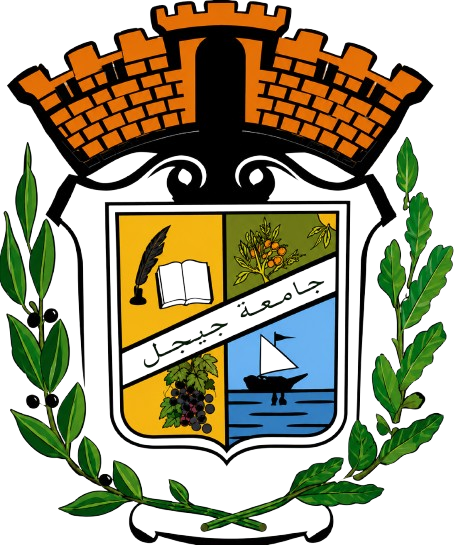
- Other name: University of Mohamed Seddik Benyahia
- Type: Public
- Established: July 22, 2003; 23 years ago
- Rector: Pr. Nourredine Ben Ali El Cherif
- Students: 23,385 (2022)
- Location: City Ouled Aissa, BP 98, Jijel, Jijel Province, Algeria
- Website: https://www.univ-jijel.dz

The University of Jijel, (Arabic: جامعة جيجل), also known as University of Mohamed Seddik Benyahia, is a public university located in Jijel, Algeria.

The university was established in accordance with Executive Decree No. 03-258 dated 22 July 2003, after having been an annex of the University of Constantine 1 since 1986. The university comprises two poles, one in Jijel and one in Tassoust, with a third pole under construction in El Aouana.

== Faculties and Annex ==
The university has seven faculties and two annexes:

- Faculty of Science and Technology
- Faculty of Exact Sciences and Computer Science
- Faculty of Natural and Life Sciences
- Faculty of Economics, Business and Management Sciences
- Faculty of Law and Political Science
- Faculty of Letters and Languages
- Faculty of Human and Social Sciences
- Medicine Annex
- Annex of the École Normale Supérieure (ENS)

== See also ==
- List of universities in Algeria
- Mohammed Seddik Benyahia
