= University of Bechar =

University in Béchar, Algeria

The University Tahri Mohamed Béchar is a university located in Béchar, Algeria. It was established in 1986;1992;2009.

== Enrollment and staffing ==
As of the 2014–2015 academic year, there were 14,000 students enrolled at the university and a total of 600 academic staff.

== Faculties ==
The university has eight (8) faculties:

- All university fields are brought together at the University of Béchar, which offers six main areas:
  - Science and technology: the Faculty of Science and Technology.
  - Economics and management: the Faculty of Economic Sciences, Commercial Sciences, and Management Sciences.
  - Letters and languages: the Faculty of Letters and Languages.
  - Law and political science: the Faculty of Law and Political Science.
  - Human and social sciences: the Faculty of Human and Social Sciences
  - Health: the Faculty of Medicine.

== Facilities ==
The university has 10 conference rooms, 13 amphitheatres, 2 libraries, 16 computer rooms, and 72 teachers' offices.

There are 4 chemistry laboratories, 4 biology laboratories, 5 physics laboratories, 7 electronics laboratories, 7 electrotechnical laboratories, 5 engineering laboratories, a hydraulic laboratory, a languages laboratory, and 2 mechanical engineering workshops.

There are two research facilities; one is in the Department of Chemistry, and the other is an Energy Physics Laboratory.

== Cooperations ==
The university has cooperative ties with four universities in other countries:

- University of Lancaster, United Kingdom
- University of Ancona, Italy
- University of Perpignan, France
- Ibnou Zohr University, Morocco

== See also ==
- List of universities in Algeria
