= University of Boumerdes Faculty of Technology =

Public University in Algeria

M'hamed Bougara University of Boumerdès Faculty of Technology
- جامعة امحمد بوقرة بومرداس - كلية التكنولوجيا
- Current logo of the Faculty of Technology - University of Boumerdes
- Type: Faculty
- Established: 1998
- Affiliations: University of Boumerdès
- Location: Boumerdès, Boumerdès Province, Algeria
- Website: ft.univ-boumerdes.dz

The Faculty of Technology formerly faculty of engineering sciences is an Algerian faculty, located in the city of Boumerdès, Algeria. It is part of the University of Boumerdès. It was established in 1998 and it comprises eight departments.

== History ==
Under the supervision of the Ministry of Industry and Energy, in 1964 they created the African center for hydrocarbons and textiles. Then in 1973 they divided the center into two national institutes:

- INHC: National Institute of Hydrocarbons and Chemistry (French: Institut National des Hydrocarbures et de la Chimie).
- INIL: National Institute of Light Industries (French: Institut National des Industries Légères).

In 1980 and under the supervision of the Ministry of Heavy Industry, INELEC and INGM were established

- INELEC: National Institute of Electrical and Electronic Engineering (French: Institut National de Génie Electrique et Electronique).
- INGM: National Institute of Mechanical Engineering (French: Institut National de Génie Mécanique).

in June 2, 1998 and by the executive decree n ° 98-189 they created the University of Boumerdès, and the National Institute of Mechanical Engineering becomes faculty of engineering sciences, Then in 2019 the name was changed to Faculty of Technology.

== Programs ==
=== Undergraduate ===
The undergraduate bachelor's degree program in the Faculty of Technology is 3-5 years. A bachelor's degree from the University of Algeria is called "الليسانس" in Arabic and la license in French. The course usually lasts three years and is part of the LMD reform ("license", "master's", "doctor"). After graduation, students can enrol for a bachelor's degree (National Secondary School Examination) in various fields of study. Once licensed, each student can complete a two-year master's degree. Then he took the doctoral exam.

=== Departments ===
The Faculty of Technology includes the following eight departments:

- Industrial Process Engineering
- Food Technology
- Environmental Engineering
- Mechanical Engineering
- Energetics
- Industrial maintenance
- Materials Engineering
- Civil Engineering
