= University of Bouira =

University in Bouira Province, Algeria

Akli Mohand Oulhadj University of Bouira
- جامعة البويرة; University of Oum El Bouaghi Bouira
- Type: Public
- Established: 2005
- Location: Bouira, Bouira Province, Algeria
- Website: University of Bouira

University of Bouira (Arabic: جامعة البويرة) or Akli Mohand Oulhadj University of Bouira (Arabic: جامعة أكلي محمد أولحاج البويرة, is a university located in Algeria in the Bouira. It was established in 2005.

== See also ==
- M'hamed Bougara University of Boumerdès
- List of universities in Algeria
