= University of Souk Ahras =

Public university in Souk Ahras, Algeria

University of Souk Ahras Mohamed Chérif Messaadia
- جامعة سوق أهراس - محمد الشريف مساعدية ⵜⴰⵙⴷⴰⵡⵉⵜ ⵎⵓⵃⵎⵎⴰⴷ ⵛⴰⵔⵉⴼ ⵎⵓⵙⴰⴷⵉⵢⴰ - ⵙⵓⴽ ⴰⵀⵔⴰⵙ
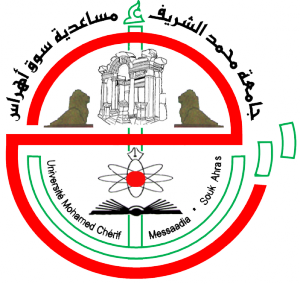
- Logo of the University of Souk Ahras
- Type: Public
- Established: 1998; 28 years ago (as a university centre); 2011; 15 years ago (as a full university)
- Affiliations: 6 faculties, 2 institutes Agence universitaire de la Francophonie
- Rector: Noura Moussa
- Students
- Location: Souk Ahras, Algeria
- Campus: Urban
- Website: www.univ-soukahras.dz

The University of Souk Ahras Mohamed Chérif Messaadia (in Arabic: جامعة سوق أهراس - محمد الشريف مساعدية; in Tamazight: ⵜⴰⵙⴷⴰⵡⵉⵜ ⵎⵓⵃⵎⵎⴰⴷ ⵛⴰⵔⵉⴼ ⵎⵓⵙⴰⴷⵉⵢⴰ - ⵙⵓⴽ ⴰⵀⵔⴰⵙ) is a public university located in Souk Ahras, in northeastern Algeria.

== History ==
The institution was established in 1998 as a university centre (centre universitaire) attached to Badji Mokhtar University of Annaba. Its administrative and financial autonomy was formalized by Algerian executive decree No. 01-279 of 30 September 2001, which set the number of affiliated institutes at two; this decree was subsequently amended by executive decree No. 06-282 of 16 August 2006, which redefined the institution's constituent institutes.

In 2011, the centre was officially promoted to a full accredited university comprising six faculties and two institutes.

== Faculties and institutes ==
The university is composed of six faculties and two institutes:

- Faculty of Science and Technology
- Faculty of Natural and Life Sciences
- Faculty of Arts and Languages
- Faculty of Law and Political Science
- Faculty of Economics, Commercial and Management Sciences
- Faculty of Human and Social Sciences

== See also ==
- List of universities in Algeria
- Souk Ahras
