= University of Boumerdès Faculty of Sciences =

Faculty in the University of Boumerdès in Boumerdès, Algeria

M'hamed Bougara University of Boumerdès Faculty of Sciences
- Type: Faculty
- Established: 1998
- Affiliations: University of Boumerdès
- Location: Boumerdès, Boumerdès Province, Algeria
- Website: fs.univ-boumerdes.dz

The Faculty of Sciences is an Algerian faculty, located in the city of Boumerdès, Algeria.It is part of the University of Boumerdès. It was established in 1998.

== History ==
Under the supervision of the Ministry of Industry and Energy, in 1964 they created the African center for hydrocarbons and textiles. Then in 1973 they divided the center into two national institutes:

- INHC: National Institute of Hydrocarbons and Chemistry (French: Institut National des Hydrocarbures et de la Chimie).
- INIL: National Institute of Light Industries (French: Institut National des Industries Légères).

on June 2, 1998, and by the executive decree n ° 98-189 they created the University of Boumerdès, and the National Institute of Light Industries becomes faculty of sciences.

== Programs ==
=== Undergraduate ===
The undergraduate bachelor's degree program for the faculty of sciences is based on a 3-5 year program. Bachelor's degrees in Algerian universities are called "الليسانس" in Arabic or la licence in French; the degree normally takes three years to complete and is a part of the LMD ("license", "master", "doctorate") reform, students can enroll in a bachelor's degree program in different fields of study after having obtained their baccalauréat (the national secondary education test). After the licence each student can complete Master for two years. After which he will pass an exam for a doctorate.

=== Departments ===
The departments in faculty of sciences at the M'hamed Bougara University of Boumerdès are as follows:

- Department of Chemistry
- Department of Physics
- Department of Mathematics
- Department of Computer Science
- Department of Biology
