= University of Oran 2 Mohamed Ben Ahmed =

University in Algeria

University of Oran 2
- جامعة وهران 2 محمد بن أحمد
- Type: Public university
- Established: 2014
- Rector: Smain Balaska
- Students: 26000
- Postgraduates: 51 (2020-2021)
- Location: Oran, Algeria; 35.736°N 0.537°W
- Language: Arabic, French, English
- Website: Official website

The University of Oran 2 Mohamed Ben Ahmed (in Arabic:جامعة وهران 2 محمد بن أحمد) is an Algerian public university located in Belgaïd within the commune of Bir El Djir in the eastern suburbs of Oran. The university was established in September 2014 by executive decree no. 14-261 dated 22 September 2014, which provided for the establishment of University of Oran 2 as a division from University of Oran 1 Ahmed Ben Bella, founded in 1967.

== History ==
=== 2019 Hirak ===
During the Hirak protests, gatherings took place within the university in support of the movement
