= AEU: International Journal of Electronics and Communications =

AEU — International Journal of Electronics and Communications
- Discipline: Electrical and electronic engineering, telecommunications engineering
- Language: English
- Edited by: Shahram Minaei

Publication details
- Former name: Archiv für Elektronik und Übertragungstechnik
- History: 1971–present
- Publisher: Elsevier
- Frequency: Monthly
- Impact factor: 3.0 (2023)

Standard abbreviations
- ISO 4: AEU-Int. J. Electron. Commun.

Indexing
- ISSN: 1434-8411 (print); 1618-0399 (web)
- LCCN: 2019205102
- OCLC no.: 829897279

Links
- Journal homepage; Online access; Online archive

AEU — International Journal of Electronics and Communications is a monthly peer-reviewed scientific journal published by Elsevier. It covers research on electrical and electronic engineering. It was established in 1971 as the Archiv für Elektronik und Übertragungstechnik and obtained its current title in 2001. The editor-in-chief is Shahram Minaei (Doğuş University).

== Abstracting and indexing ==
The journal is abstracted and indexed in:

- Current Contents/Electronics & Telecommunications Collection
- Current Contents/Engineering, Computing & Technology
- EBSCO databases
- Ei Compendex
- Inspec
- ProQuest databases
- Science Citation Index Expanded
- Scopus

According to the Journal Citation Reports, the journal has a 2023 impact factor of 3.0.
