= University of Laghouat =

University in Laghouat, Algeria

Coordinates: 33.79°N 2.85°E

- جامعة عمار ثليجي (Arabic); Université Amar Telidji Laghouat (French)
- Other name: UL
- Type: Public
- Established: 1986
- Affiliations: Arab Universities Union
- Students: ~27,360
- Location: Route de Ghardaia BP G37 (M'kam), Laghouat, Laghouat Province, Algeria
- Website: lagh-univ.dz

The University of Laghouat or Amar Telidji University of Laghouat (Arabic: جامعة عمار ثليجي, French: Université Amar Telidji Laghouat) is a university in the city of Laghouat, the capital city of Laghouat Province in Algeria. It was established in 1986 and given full university status in 2001.

The university is named after Ali Thaleji, called "Amar", who served in the signal corps of the National Liberation Army during the Algerian War.

== History ==
Before becoming a national university, the university passed through several stages. University education in Laghouat began under Executive Decree No. 86-165 of August 5, 1986, which ordered the establishment of the Higher School for Technical Education Teachers. The number of students for the 1986–7 academic year was 314 under the supervision of 23 professors.

Under Decree No. 97-157 of 10 May 1997, the Higher School for Technical Education Teachers was changed into a university center. The center included four departments: electrical engineering, mechanical engineering, civil engineering, and economics.

In 1995, the university began offering postgraduate studies in materials science. Other departments were established including industrial chemistry in 1997, informatics, law, and management in 1998, and biology in 2000.

Under Executive Decree No. 01-270 of September 19, 2001, the university was officially recognized as a national university.

== Faculties and institutes ==
The university comprises ten faculties and one institute:

- Faculty of Technology
- Faculty of Sciences
- Faculty of Medicine
- Faculty of Civil Engineering and Architecture
- Faculty of Economic, Commercial and Management Sciences
- Faculty of Law and Political Sciences
- Faculty of Letters and Languages
- Faculty of Human and Social Sciences
- Faculty of Islamic Sciences and Civilisation
- Institute of Sciences and Techniques of Physical and Sports Activities (ISTAPS)

== Research ==
The university maintains an open access institutional repository hosted on DSpace containing over 13,000 theses, dissertations, and academic works. As of 2026, OpenAlex records approximately 4,600 publications and 92,000 citations attributed to the institution. Several scientific journals are published under the university's auspices, including those indexed in the DOAJ.
