= Mohamed El Bachir El Ibrahimi University =

Research institution in Algeria

Coordinates: 36.048°N 4.802°E

- Type: Public university
- Rector: Pr Karim ABBAOUI
- Faculty: 450
- Students: 12,000
- Location: Bordj Bou Arreridj, Algeria
- Language: Arabic and French
- Website: Official website

Mohamed El Bachir El Ibrahimi University is a university located in Bordj Bou Arreridj, Algeria.

== History ==
The initial core of the Bordj-Bou-Arreridj University Annex was built starting on July 15, 2000, and was led by Professor CHELALI Nacer. It was annexed to Ferhat Abbas University of Sétif, which was headed during this period by Professor BENACHOUR Djaffer.

On September 18, 2001, the Bordj Bou Arréridj University Center was created by Executive Decree No. 01-275. It comprised the Institute of Electronics and the Institute of Computer Science.

Following the restructuring of the University Center by Executive Decree No. 06-278 of August 16, 2006, the two institutes composing the center were renamed: the Institute of Science and Technology and the Institute of Economic, Commercial, and Management Sciences.

According to Executive Decree No. 10-17 of January 12, 2010, the University Center consisted of four institutes: the Institute of Science and Technology, the Institute of Economic, Commercial, and Management Sciences, the Institute of Letters and Languages and Social and Human Sciences, and the Institute of Computer Science and Mathematics.

By Executive Decree No. 12-244 of June 4, 2012, the University of Bordj Bou Arréridj was established and now comprises seven faculties (MI, SNVSTU, LL, SSH, DSP, SECSG, ST) and twenty departments (Decrees 333-339 of October 11, 2012).

The University of Bordj Bou Arréridj offers three cycles of LMD (License, Master, Doctorate) training with 40 License programs, 33 Master programs, and 8 Doctorate programs spread across 9 fields of specialties. For the 2014–2015 academic year, the total number of enrolled students was over 12,000, supervised by 450 permanent teachers.

== Academic Programs ==
The University of Bordj Bou Arréridj offers two educational tracks: the LMD system (License-Master-Doctorate) and the classical system.

=== LMD System ===
==== Licenses ====
The university offers 34 License programs in the following fields:

- Science and Technology: Process Engineering, Civil Engineering, Communication, Industrial Computing, Electromechanics, Automation, Electrical Engineering, Energy Mechanics, and Electronic Systems Design
- Natural and Life Sciences: Microbiology, Applied Biochemistry, Sustainable Development in Rural Areas, Ecotoxicology, Food Microbiology, and Phytopathology
- Material Sciences: Analytical Chemistry, Materials Physics, and Energy Physics
- Mathematics and Computer Science: Applied Mathematics, Fundamental Mathematics, Image Processing, Decision-Making, Operational Research
- Economics, Management, and Commercial Sciences: Accounting, International Trade, Marketing, and Management
- Humanities and Social Sciences: Human Resource Development Sociology, Communication Sociology, Organization, and Work
- Arabic Language and Literature: Arabic Literature
- Letters and Foreign Languages: French Didactics

==== Masters ====
The university offers ten Master programs in the following specialties:

- Applied Mathematics
- Process Engineering and Environment
- Telecommunications
- Industrial Computing
- Civil Engineering
- Materials Physics and Numerical Modeling
- Analytical Chemistry
- Materials Chemistry
- Decision-Making Computer Engineering
- Networks and Multimedia
- Electromechanics

==== Doctorates ====
During the 2009/2010 academic year, two Doctorate programs were approved:

- Process Engineering and Environment
- Electrical Engineering and Industrial Computing

=== Classical System ===
The university offers three Licenses in Economics and Management:

- Finance, Money, and Banking
- Finance
- Accounting

And three State Engineering programs in Technology:

- Electronics
- Computer Science
- Electromechanics

The University Center also offers a master's degree in Economic Sciences.
