= University of Setif 1 =

Algerian university

Ferhat Abbas University
- Established: 1978
- Website: univ-setif.dz
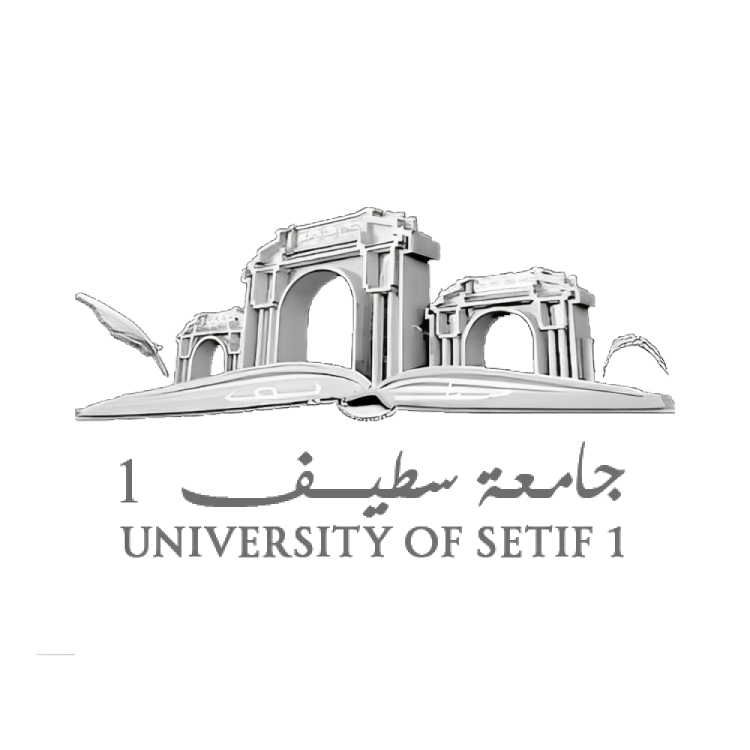

The University Ferhat Abbas of Setif "Université Ferhat Abbas de Sétif (UFAS)" is a university located in Setif, Algeria. It was founded in 1978.

== See also ==
- List of universities in Algeria
