= Education in Algeria =

Ministry of National Education

General details
- Primary languages: Arabic, French

Literacy (2015)
- Total: 80%
- Male: 87%
- Female: 73%

Education in Algeria is free and compulsory for Algerians from the ages of 6 to 15. However, only half of Algerian students are enrolled in secondary schools. As of 2015, Algeria has 92 post-secondary institutions, which includes 48 universities.

== History ==
Before the French conquest of Algiers in 1830, religious lands called hubus paid for Muslim teachers. When the French colonized Algeria, they seized the hubus, which ended traditional education funding. During the colonization of Algeria, Napoleon III reestablished the usage of madrasa schools and created primary schools that were both in Arabic and French. However, during the Third Republic, the Parisian government tried to assimilate Algerians into the French culture, but their policies were frustrated by French colonists who blocked funding for new schools.

After the war for independence, Algeria introduced several policies to reform and strengthen the educational structure. The Ministry of Education was created in 1963. Arabization of the school curriculum—replacing French language and values with Arab language and values—was a key priority of the new ministry.

== Educational System ==
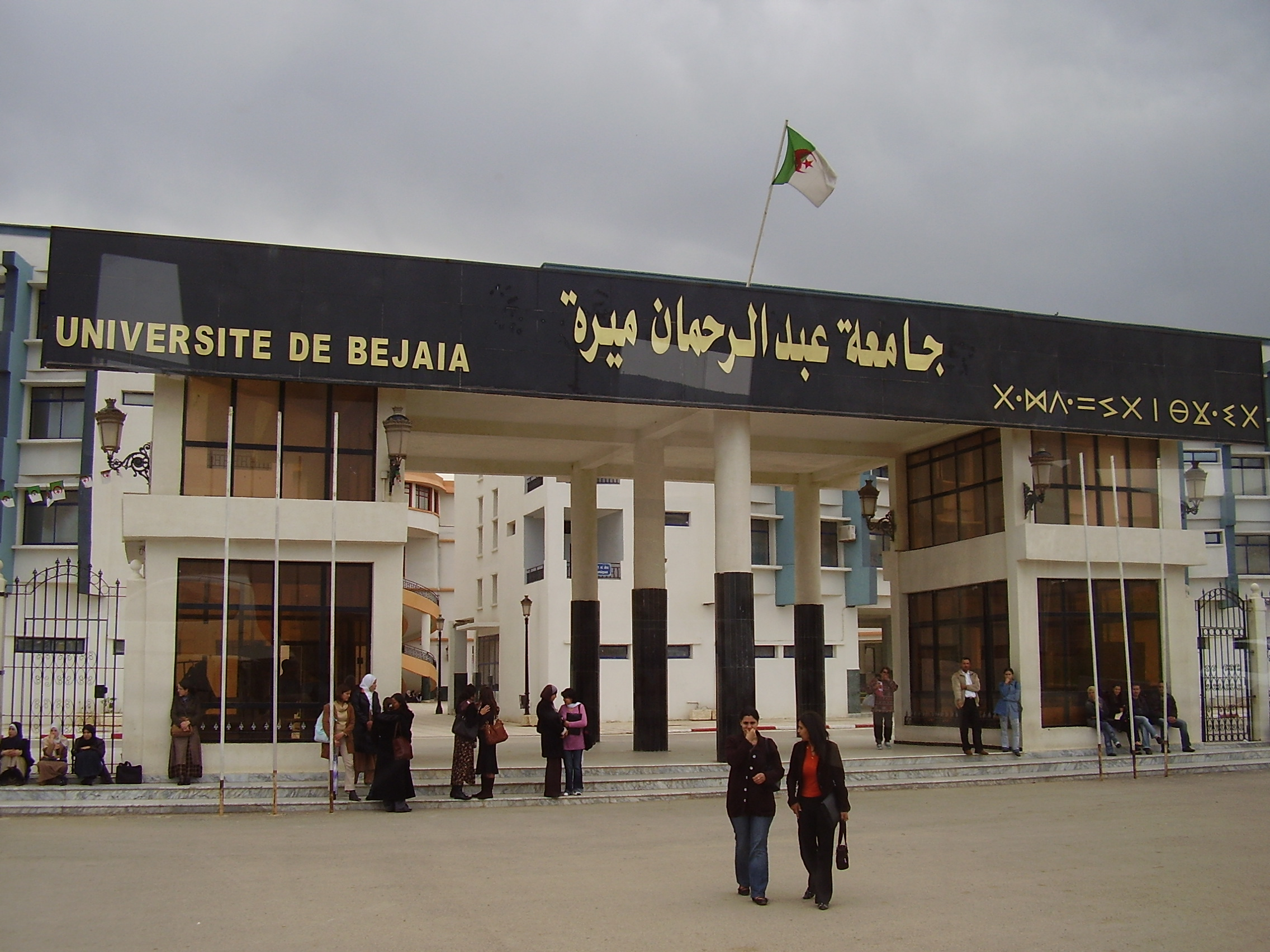
University of Béjaïa.

In Algeria, 24% of children were enrolled in pre-school as of 2004. New reforms have been implemented since 2003 to make pre-schooling more accessible.

Primary school lasts for 5 years. Then, students move on to 4 years of lower secondary school and 3 additional years of upper secondary school. Primary and Lower Secondary Education, which is termed "Enseignment Fondemental" is the basic education that everyone is required to receive. If students wish to pursue higher education, they must take the baccalauréat, a national exam.

There are approximately 57 public institutions for higher education, which include "27 universities, 13 university centers, 6 national schools (écoles nationales), 6 national institutes (instituts nationaux), and 4 teacher-training institutes (écoles normales supérieures)." As of 2015, Algeria has 92 post-secondary institutions, which includes 48 universities. People typically study three years for a bachelor's degree, two years for a Master's Program, and three years for a doctorate.

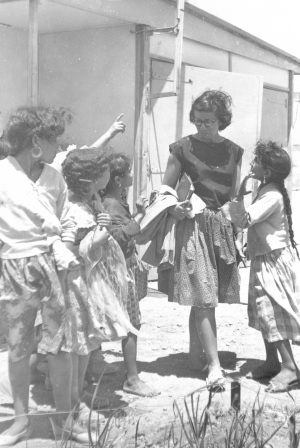
School Children In Algeria 1967

== Languages ==
Students in Algeria are primarily taught in Arabic, although teachers have been allowed to teach in Berber as of 2003. Berber teaching is allowed in Algerian schools to remove the complaints of Arabization and need for non-Algerian teachers. In 1994, Kabyle pupils and students boycotted Algerian schools for a year, demanding the officialization of Berber, leading to the symbolic creation of the Haut Commissariat à l'Amazighité (HCA) in 1995. Berber was subsequently taught as a non-compulsory language in Berber speaking areas. As of 2017, 350,000 pupils were studying tamazight in 38 wilayas out of 58, representing 4% of all students. 90% of them study tamazight in Latin characters. In 2018, the government announced that optional classes of tamazight will be offered in all public primary and secondary schools in the future. The generalization of Amazigh education was met with some opposition in Arabic-speaking areas. As of 2023, according to the education minister, education in Amazigh is still being rolled out to all Algerian schools.

Before colonialism, Algeria was home primarily to Arabic and Berber speakers. Due to Algeria's French colonial past, French was the first foreign language taught in Algerian schools. However, a month before independence, Algerian revolutionary leaders declared that the future State would be committed to arabisation. Ahmed Ben Bella implemented linguistic arabisation laws in primary schools and required teaching in Arabic on all levels from 1963/1964. In 2004, language restrictions were enforced that made 90% of all teaching in Algerian schools in Arabic. In November 2005, Parliament passed laws that banned private schools from teaching in any other language but Arabic.

Linguistics has been a source of contention for the Algerian educational system. The shift from bilingualism in French and Arabic to monolingualism in Arabic has created issues with graduates trying to enter the economic market.

== Literacy ==
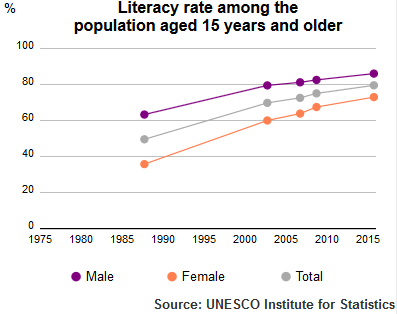
UIS literacy rate Algeria population plus 15 1980–2015

The literacy rate in Algeria has improved significantly in the decades since independence from France. In 1950, the Algerian adult literacy rate was less than 20%. After independence in 1962, more than 85% of the population was still illiterate. As of 2015, Algeria's literacy rate is estimated to be around 80%, higher than the literacy rates of Morocco and Egypt, but lower than Libya's literacy rate. Of the 2015 literacy rate, 87% of Algerian males are literate, compared to 73% of Algerian females.

Since the Multilingual National Strategy for Literacy was put in place in 2008, over 3.6 million Algerians have been lifted out of illiteracy. Between 2008 and 2022, the illiteracy rate fell from 22.30% to 7.4%. Algeria's efforts have been rewarded with the 2019 UNESCO King Sejong Literacy Prize.

== Funding and Employment ==
Education makes up 28% of Algeria's national budget. Algeria has one of the largest shortages of teachers in Northern Africa, with 200,000 primary teachers needed to help reach the United Nations's Sustainable Development Goal for education, as of 2016.

== Education by numbers ==
The number of children enrolled in school has increased significantly post-independence. In 1962, there were only 750,000 children enrolled in primary school and 3,000 students attending universities. By 1984, there were more than 900,000 students enrolled in school and 107,000 students in college. In 2005, enrollment rates were about 97% at primary school level and 66% at secondary school level.

Statistics by the UNESCO Institute for Statistics for the 2011–2012 academic year:

Pupils	Census
Primary school	3.452.000
Lower secondary school	3.240.000
Upper Secondary school	1.333.000
Total	8.023.000

== See also ==
- List of universities in Algeria
