= University of Boumerdès =

University in Algeria

University of M'hamed Bougara Boumerdès
- جامعة امحمد بوقرة – بومرداس
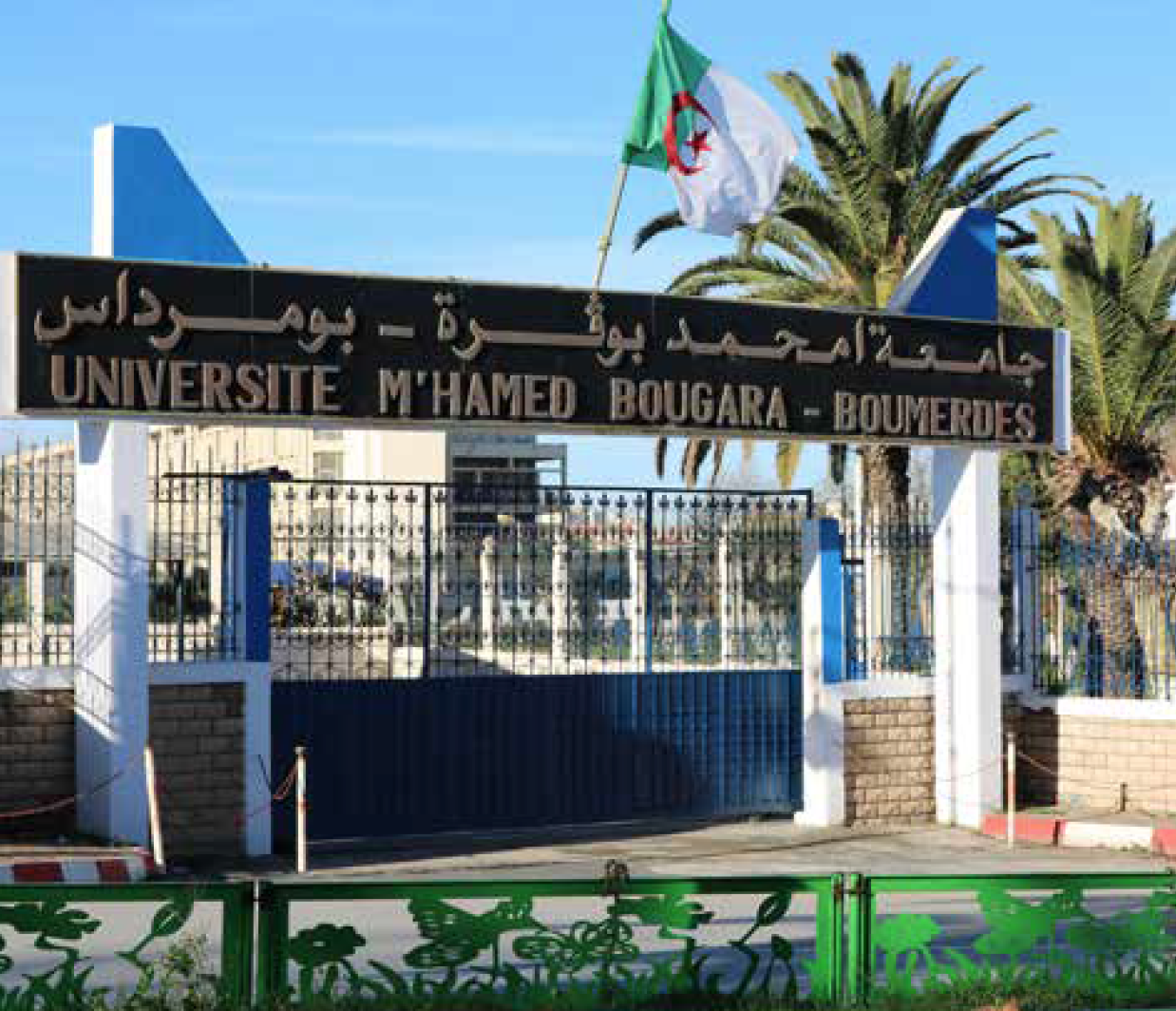
- Main entrance of the university campus
- Type: Public
- Established: 1998
- Location: Boumerdès, Boumerdès Province, Algeria
- Website: www.univ-boumerdes.dz

University of Boumerdes (Arabic: جامعة بومرداس, French: Université de Boumerdès), or M’Hamed Bougara University of Boumerdès (Arabic: جامعة امحمد بوڨرة-بومرداس), abbreviated as UMBB is a university located in the center of Algeria in the Boumerdès Province. It was established in 1998.

== Faculties and Institutes ==
- University of Boumerdès Faculty of Sciences
- University of Boumerdes Faculty of Technology
- University of Boumerdès Faculty of Hydrocarbons and Chemistry
- University of Boumerdès Faculty of Economic and Commercial Sciences
- University of Boumerdès Faculty of Rights
- University of Boumerdès Institute of Electrical and Electronic Engineering

== See also ==
- List of universities in Algeria
