= Ministry of Higher Education and Scientific Research (Algeria) =

Government ministry of Algeria

Department overview
- Jurisdiction: Government of Algeria
- Headquarters: Algiers
- Minister responsible: Kamel Bidari, Minister of Higher Education and Scientific Research
- Website: www.mesrs.dz

The Ministry of Higher Education and Scientific Research (Arabic: وزارة التعليم العالي والبحث العلمي, French: Ministère de l'Enseignement supérieur et de la Recherche scientifique) is a government agency of Algeria. Kamel Bidari is the minister. Its head office is in Algiers.
