= Ministry of Health, Population and Hospital Reform =

Government ministry of Algeria

- Arabic: وزارة الصحة و السكان وإصلاح المستشفيات; French: Ministère de la Santé, de la Population et de la Réforme Hospitalière

Agency overview
- Formed: 1962
- Preceding agency: Ministry of Health
- Type: Public health
- Jurisdiction: Government of Algeria
- Headquarters: 125, Bd Abderrahmane Laala, El Madania, Algiers, Algeria; 36.74733158813259°N 3.062108381753797°E
- Minister responsible: Abdelhak Saihi
- Website: sante.gov.dz

The Ministry of Health, Population and Hospital Reform (MSPRH) is the health ministry of Republic of Algeria. It is located in El Madania, a municipality of Algiers. The Ministry is responsible for public health facilities and population monitoring. The Minister is a member of the Council of Ministers of Algeria, which reports to the President of Algeria as part of the executive branch of the government.

== History ==
The Ministry of Health, Population and Hospital Reform was formerly the Ministry of Health and Population. The name was changed in about 2000.

The ministry has organized the country into five regions with 5 Health Regional Councils (CRS) and 5 Regional Health Observatories (RHAs). At the Provincial level, there are 48 Directorates of Health and Population (one per province).

== Ministers ==
The current minister is Abdelhak Saihi (since 9 September 2022). Former ministers include:

- fr:Abderrahmane Benbouzid (January 4, 2020–September 8, 2022)
- Mohamed Miraoui (2019–2020)
- Mokhtar Hasbellaoui (2017–2019)
- fr:Abdelmalek Boudiaf (2013–2017)
- fr:Abdelaziz Ziari (2012–2013)
- fr:Said Barkat, Minister of Health (2008–2010)
- fr:Amor Tou (2005–2008)
- Yahia Kaidum (1995)
- Muhammed Al-Saghir Babs (1992–1994)
- Zahia Mentouri, Minister of Health and Social Affairs (1992)
- fr:Nafissa Hamoud, Minister of Health (early 1990s)
- fr:Amara Benyounes, administrator of the Ministry of Health (1988–1990)
- Kasdi Merbah, Minister of Health (1988)
- fr:Mohamed Seghir Nekkache, Minister of Health (1962–1965)

== Organization ==
The Ministry is organized into the following units:

General Secretariat
- Minister's office
- Inspector General

General Directorate of Prevention and Promotion of Health

- Directorate for the Prevention and Control of Communicable Diseases
- Noncommunicable Diseases Directorate
- Socio-environmental prevention department
- Under Directorate of Immunization Programs and Health Promotion.
- Sub-Directorate for the fight against prevalent diseases and health alert
- Sub-Directorate for the prevention of non-communicable diseases and the fight against risk factors

Department of specific health actions

Mental Health Promotion Department

Environment and Food Risk Prevention Department

General Directorate of Health Services and Hospital Reform

Direction of care programs, ethics and medical deontology

Department of hospitals and hospital reform

Department of local health structures

- Under the direction of the new birth, childhood, adolescence and youth care programs

Adult and Elderly Care Programs Department

Department of Ethics and Medical Deontology

- Under the direction of public hospitals
- Under the direction of private hospitals
- Under the Emergency Department

Department of local health structures and home care

Under the Directorate of Private Medicine

General Directorate of Pharmacy and Health Equipment

- Pharmaceuticals Directorate
- Health equipment department
- Pharmaceutical Products Promotion Department
- Under the Directorate of Pharmaceutical Product Registration
- Regulation and Technical Activities Department
- Under the direction of hospital pharmacy
- Health Equipment Approval Department
- Health Equipment Regulation and Supply Department

Technical Support Department

Human Resources Department

Under the Direction of Medical and Paramedical Staff

Under Direction of Administrative and Technical Staff

Department of Studies and Planning

Department of Studies and Investment Programs

Planning Department

Department of Finance and Resources

Budget and Accounting Department

Sub-Directorate of General Resources

Information Systems and Computing Department

Organization and Information System Department

Computer Networks Department

Training Department

- Under the Direction of Initial Training
- Under the Continuing Education Department

Directorate of Regulation, Litigation and Cooperation

- Regulatory Department
- Sub-Directorate of Litigation
- Legal Studies Department

Under the Cooperation Department

Directorate of Population

- Department of Reproductive Health and Family Planning
- Under the Studies, Research and Analysis Department
- Department of Foresight and Demographic Watch
- Population Strategies and Programs Department

== Public health establishments ==
In 2020, there were according to the Ministry 586 public health establishments in Algeria. There are 69,948 beds in CHU, EHU, EH, EHS, and EPH establishments and 6,584 beds in community hospitals (EPSP). These establishments are broken down as follows:

Public health establishments in Algeria
| Type | Number of establishments | Number of beds |
|---|---|---|
| CHU | 15 | 13,755 |
| EHU | 1 | 770 |
| EH | 9 | 1,533 |
| EHS | 83 | 13,384 |
| EPH | 207 | 40,506 |
| EPSP | 273 | 6,585 |

=== Centre Hospitalo-Universitaire (CHU) ===
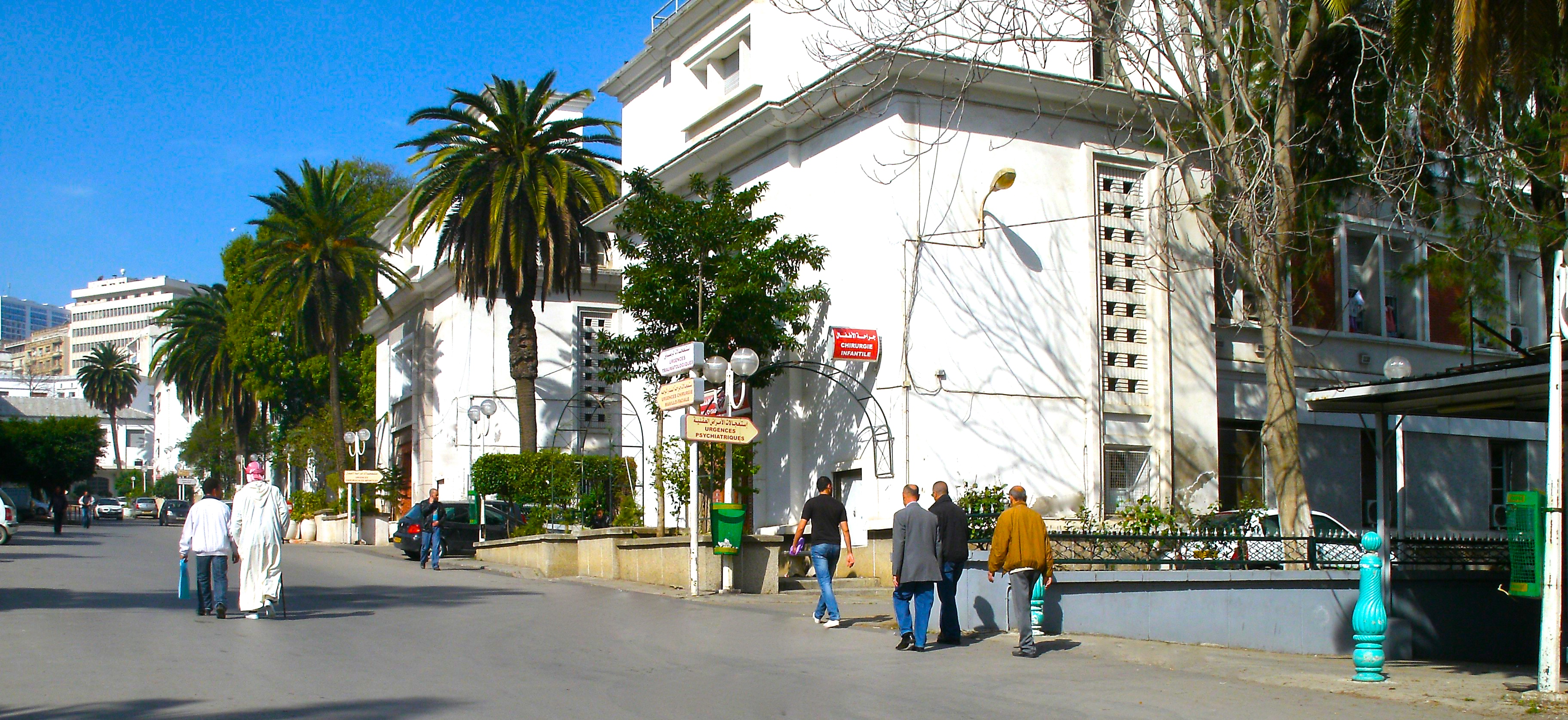
CHU Mustapha Pacha, Algiers

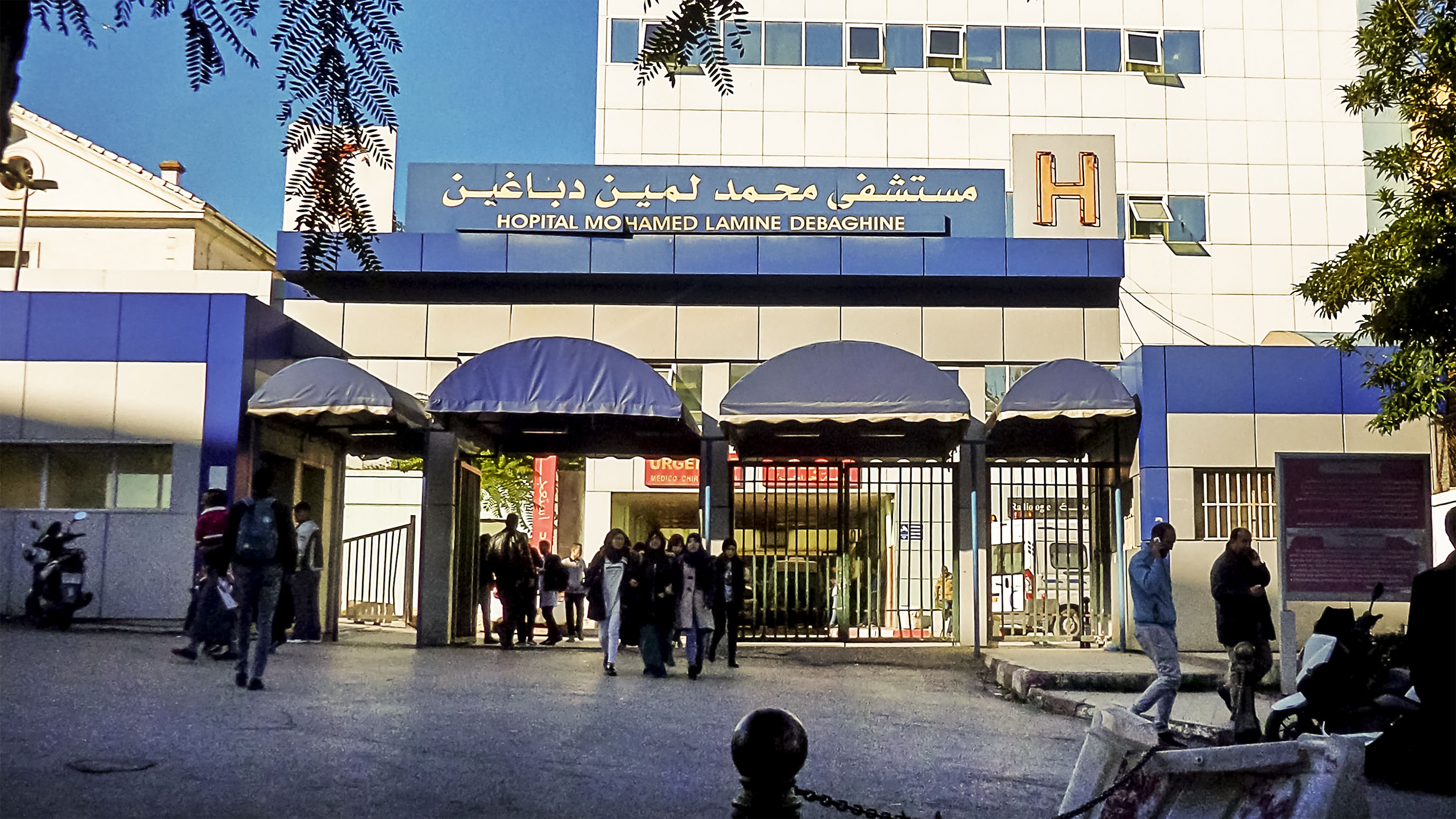
CHU Mohamad Lamine Debaghine

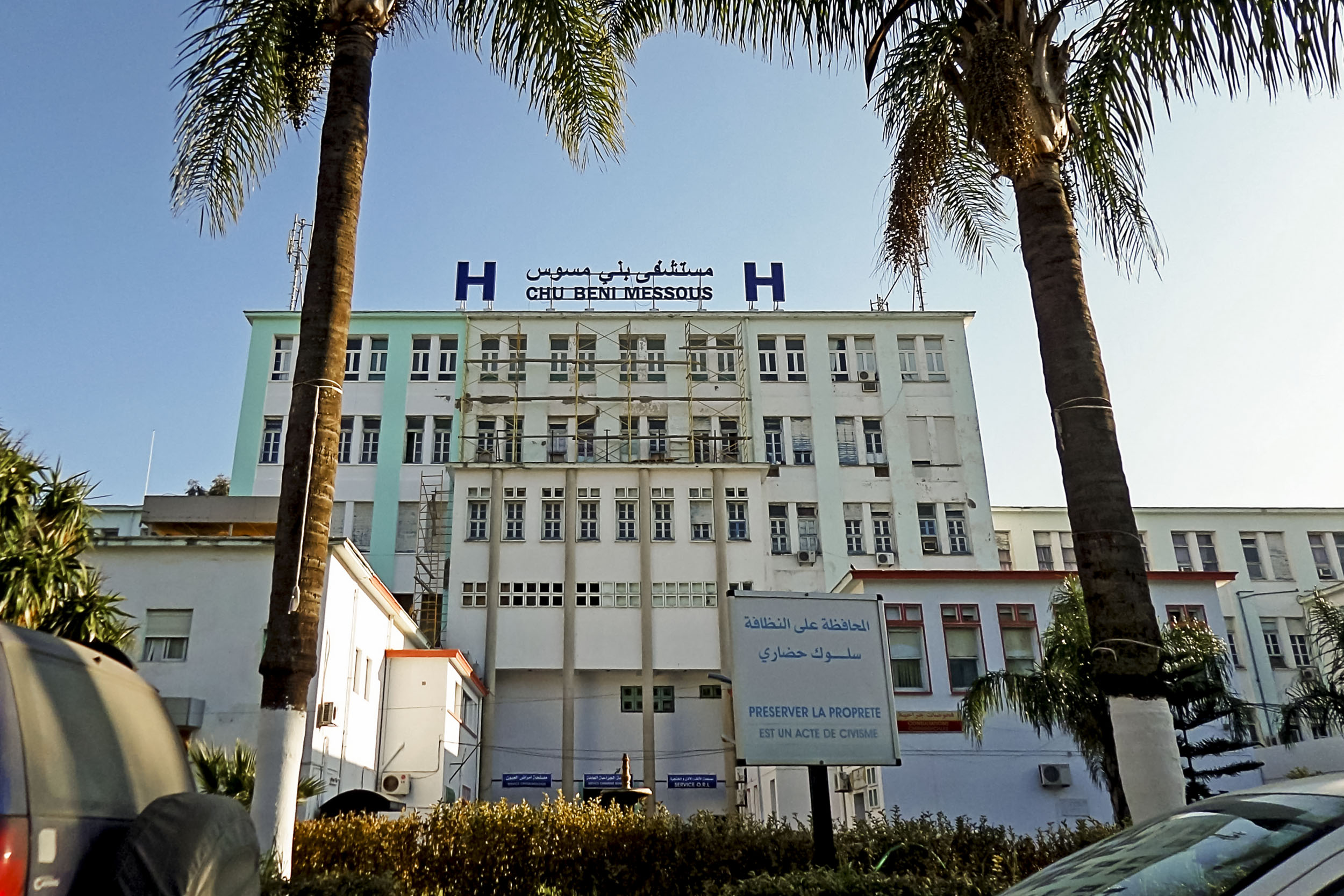
CHU Béni Messours

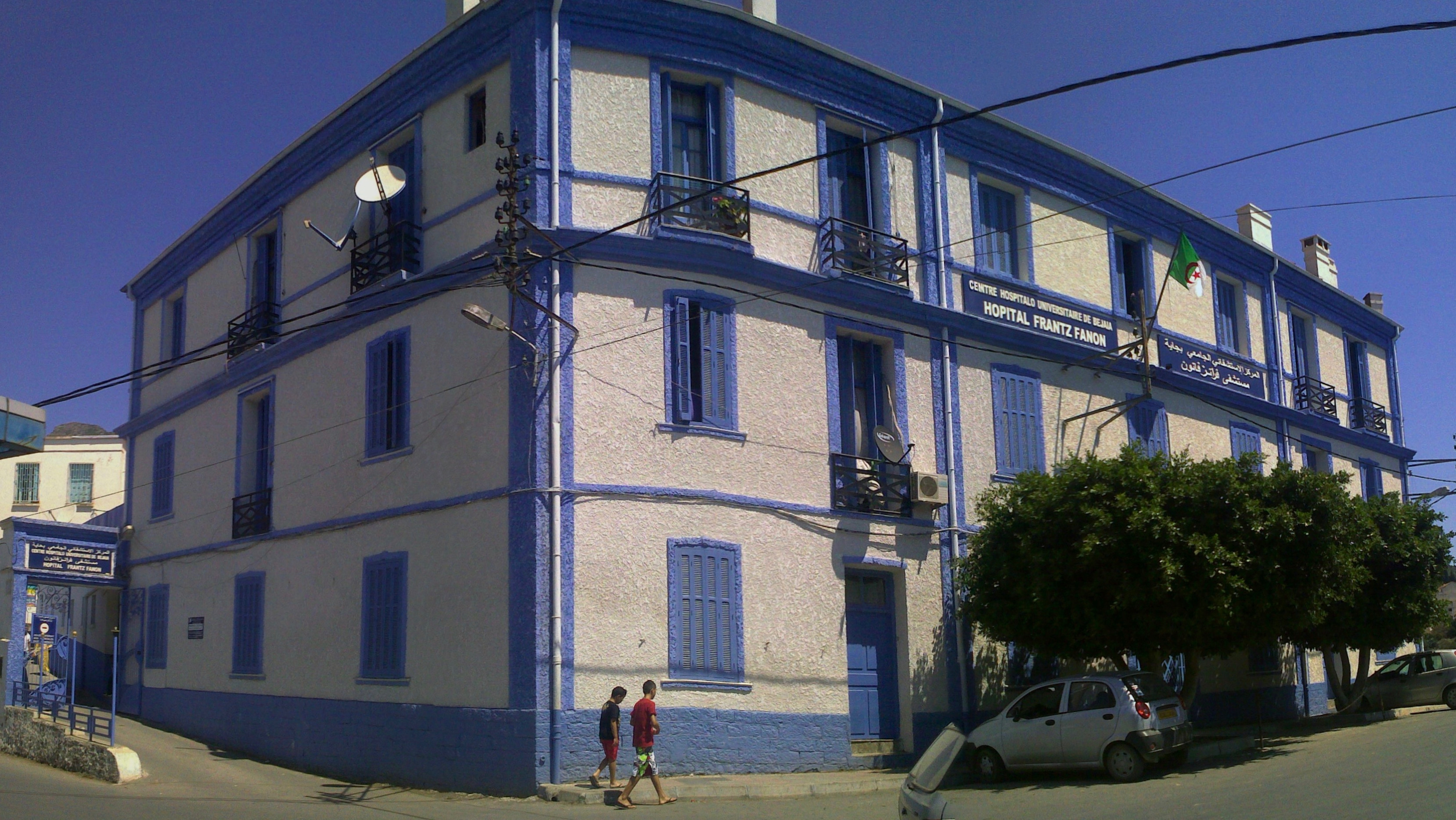
CHU Béjaïa, Frantz Fanon

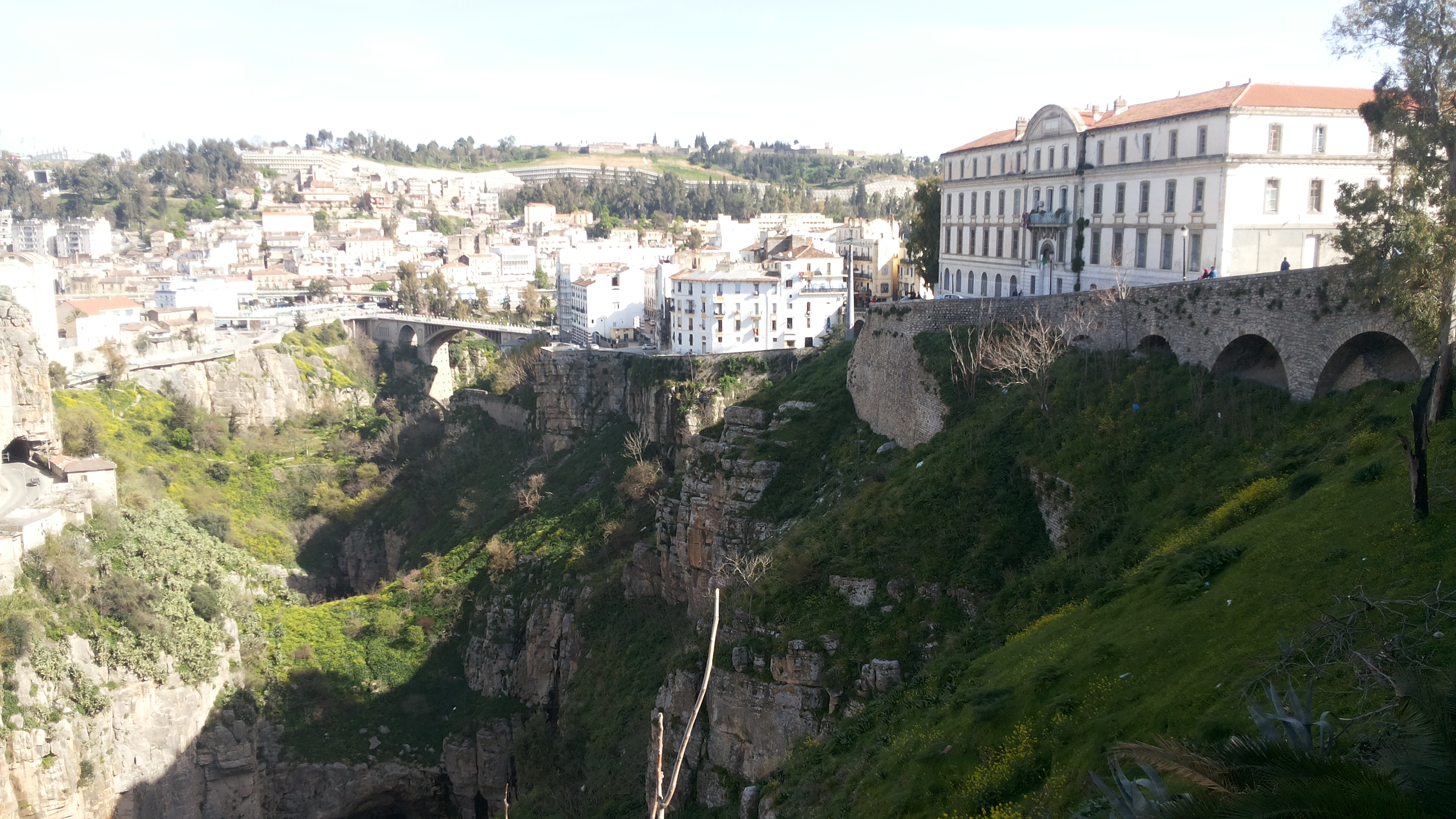
CHU Abdelhamid Ben Badis

According to the Algerian Ministry of Health, Population and Hospital Reform there were 15 Centre Hospitalo-Universitaire (CHU) in Algeria in 2019, up from 13 in 2004. In 2019, there were 13,755 beds in the CHU facilities. A CHU may include multiple hospitals. Below is a list of the CHU in Algeria, showing the region, city, province, affiliated university, and number of beds.

Centre Hospitalo-Universitaire (CHU) in Algeria
| Region | CHU | City | Province | University | Beds |
|---|---|---|---|---|---|
| Center | CHU Mustapha Pacha | Sidi M'Hamed36.762207368724354°N 3.0534096682635736°E | Algiers Province | Algiers 1 University | 1,500, established in 1854 |
| Center | CHU Mohamad Lamine Debaghine | Bab El Oued36.79565151308986°N 3.0494983694528135°E | Algiers Province | Algiers 1 University | |
| Center | CHU Nafissa Hamoud Hussein Dey | Hussein Dey36.73679542236154°N 3.1048112375713504°E | Algiers Province | Algiers 1 University | |
| Center | CHU Issad Hassani Béni Messous | Béni Messous36.78713404409454°N 2.980965244172839°E | Algiers Province | Algiers 1 University | |
| Center | Part of CHUs: CHU Djillali Bounaâma Douéra; CHU/EPSP Zéralda Belkacemi Tayeb (700 beds) | Douéra, Zéralda | Algiers Province | Algiers 1 University | |
| East | CHU Annaba: CHU Ibn Sina Annaba (466 beds); CHU Dorban (198 beds); CHU Hospital of Mother and Child El Bouni (150 beds); CHU Sainte Thérèse (94 beds); CHU Anti-Cancer Center (150 beds) | Annaba36.9106126284729°N 7.7467060817601014°E | Annaba Province | Badji Mokhtar Annaba University | 1,058 |
| East | CHU Benflis Al-Tohamy University Hospital | Batna35.53213725592191°N 6.188836224034549°E | Batna Province | Batna 2 University | 612 |
| Center | CHU Béjaïa: Frantz Fanon Hospital (104 beds); Khelil Amrane Hospital (204 beds); Targa Ouzemmour Hospital (105 beds) | Béjaïa36.7562273°N 5.083458°E | Béjaïa Province | University of Béjaïa | 514 |
| Center | CHU Blida: CHU Blida Hassid Ben Bouali; Frantz Fanon Hospital; Mohamed Yazid Hospital; Zabana Dental Clinic | Blida36.50152278727867°N 2.8812070817442956°E | Blida Province | Blida 1 University | 723 |
| East | CHU Abdelhamid Ben Badis | Constantine36.37252087146505°N 6.617779261494081°E | Constantine Province | Constantine 1 University | 1,426 |
| Central | CHU Baloguat University | Laghouat33.792041992044155°N 2.8501201424160043°E | Laghouat Province | University of Laghouat | 240 |
| West | CHU Mostaganem Kharouba | Mostaganem35.96576119243395°N 0.10374179305732123°E | Mostaganem Province | Abdelhamid Ibn Badis University of Mostaganem | 240 |
| West | CHU Oran | Oran35.693276°N 0.639028°W | Oran Province | Oran 1 University | 2,922, CHU in 2003 |
| East | CHU Saadna Abdenour Sétif | Sétif36.19224842747581°N 5.402855552787355°E | Sétif Province | Ferhat Abbas Sétif 1 University | 838 |
| West | CHU Hassani Abdelkader Sidi Bel Abbès (SBA) | Sidi Bel Abbès35.18376723104693°N 0.6482501331394779°W | Sidi Bel Abbès Province (SBA) | University of Sidi Bel Abbès (Djillali Liabes University) | 616 |
| Central | CHU Ouargla | Ouargla31.969711224237376°N 5.329370305249403°E | Ouargla Province | University of Ouargla (Université Kasdi Merbah Ouargla) | 407 |
| Center | CHU Tizi Ouzou: Nedir Mohamed Hospital; Sidi Belloua Hospital; Dental Hospital | Tizi Ouzou36.70994632168422°N 4.054537006972077°E | Tizi Ouzou Province | Mouloud Mammeri University of Tizi Ouzou | 1,043 |
| West | CHU Tlemcen | Tlemcen34.87545704153338°N 1.3270684831186101°W | Tlemcen Province | Abou Bekr Belkaid University of Tlemcen | 646, established 1954, CHU 1986 |

Map

== See also ==
- National Agency for the Digitization of Health Care
