= Centre hospitalier =

Centre hospitalier or Centre Hospitalier is a French expression denoting a hospital center. Centre hospitalier universitaire is a hospital associated with a university, providing in addition to hospitalization, learning facilities to the university's medical students.

Centre hospitalier may refer to:

== Hospitals ==
=== Canada ===
- Centre hospitalier de l'Université Laval
- Centre hospitalier de l'Université de Montréal
- Centre hospitalier universitaire Sainte-Justine
- Centre hospitalier universitaire de Québec
- Centre hospitalier universitaire de Sherbrooke
- Centre hospitalier de Lachine, also known as Lachine Hospital
- Centre hospitalier Pierre-Boucher, also known as Hôpital Pierre Boucher

=== Others ===
- Centre Hospitalier Universitaire de Grenoble, France
- Centre hospitalier universitaire vaudois, Switzerland, also known as Lausanne University Hospital
- Centre Hospitalier de Luxembourg
- Centre Hospitalier Universitaire Notre Dame des Secours, Lebanon
- Centre Hospitalier et Universitaire de Yaoundé, Cameroon, also known as University Teaching Hospital of Yaounde
- Centre Hospitalo-Universitaire Béjaïa, Algeria

== See also ==
- Lists of hospitals
- List of university hospitals
