= EPH Sisters Bedj =

- Ministry of Health, Algeria
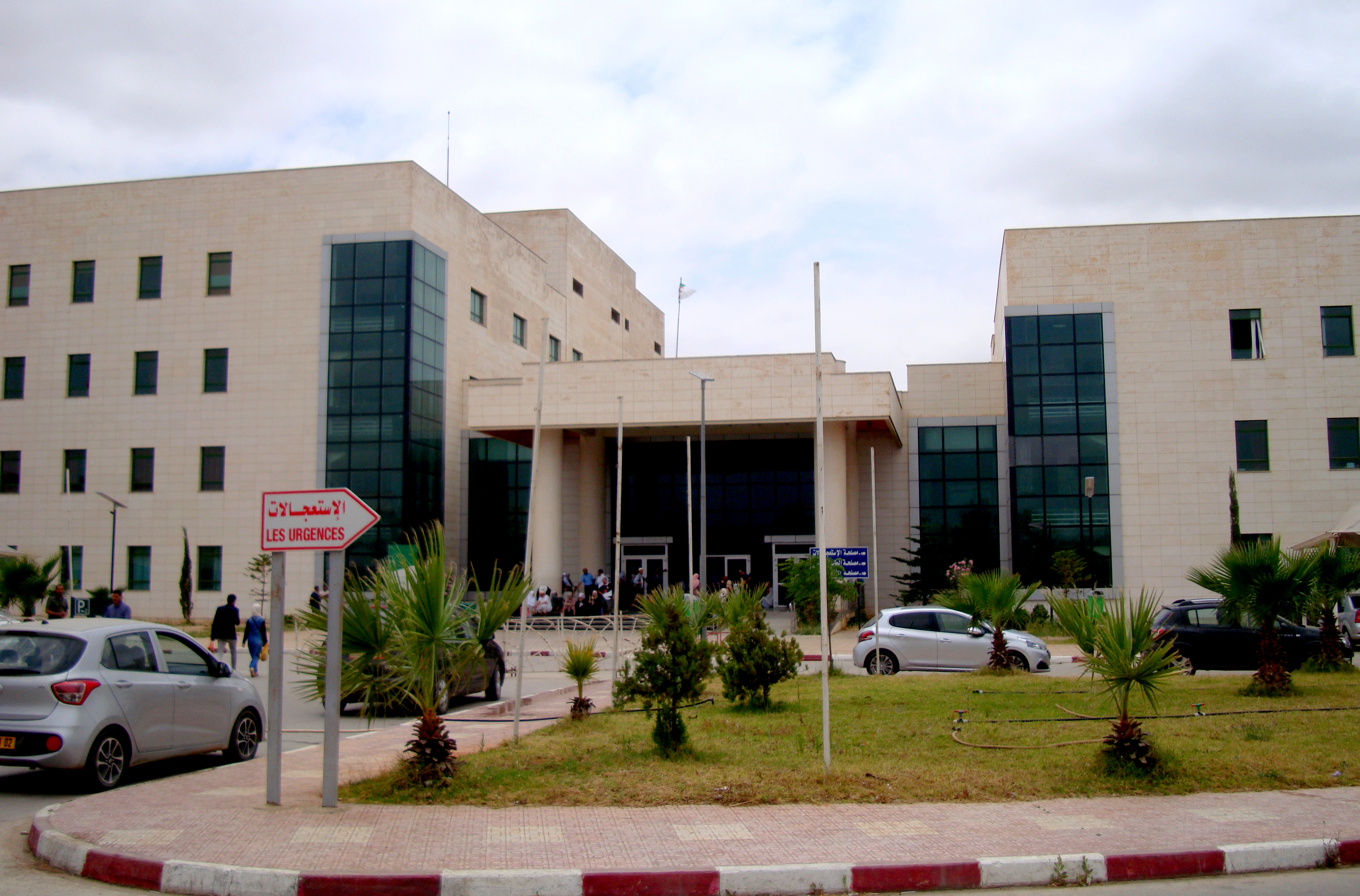
- Main entrance of EPH Sisters Bedj

Geography
- Location: Bensouna, Chlef, Chlef Province, Algeria
- Coordinates: 36.159351549552845°N 1.321252624058324°E

Organisation
- Type: General, Teaching
- Affiliated university: Blida 1 University

Services
- Emergency department: Yes
- Beds: 240

History
- Opened: November 21, 2013

Links
- Website: www.eph-soeursbedj-chlef.dz
- Lists: Hospitals in Algeria

The EPH Sisters Bedj is a public hospital (French: établissement public hospitalier) in Chlef, Chlef Province, Algeria. It is the largest hospital in Chlef Province with 240 beds.

== History ==
The hospital was named after two young revolutionary women, named Messaouda (Mériem) (1933–1958) and Fatma (1935–1959) Lalia. These Bedj sisters were from an honorable family and originally from Laghouat, Algeria and enlisted in the Algerian resistance (French: maquis) in Orléansville (currently Chlef). The two sisters took part in the war for the liberation of Algeria.

The hospital was built in accordance with Executive Decree No. 11/357, October 17, 2011 and amending and supplementing Executive Decree No. 07/140, May 19, 2007, relating to the construction and operation of public hospitals and local public health establishments. A new hospital building with 240 beds was later built.

The hospital was inaugurated on November 21, 2013 by Prime Minister Abdelmalek Sellal, who was on a working and inspection visit to the Chlef Province. The construction project cost 4 billion DA. The hospital is equipped with the necessary equipment for the care of patients, such as imaging equipment (scanner, MRI among others) and analysis laboratories. Tt also has 6 operating theaters, including one for emergencies.

The May 24, 2017, the first vascular catheterization operation at the Sisters Bedj hospital, intervention performed by Dr Bounoua Cherif.

In 2018, 320 artery surgeries were performed at Sisters Bedj hospital.

The former Mayor of Chlef, M. Mostefa Sadek, expressed his willingness to work for the promotion of the Bedj Sisters hospital with a University Hospital Center (CHU) during the autumn session of the People's Assembly of the Province in October 2018. The hospital was affiliated with the CHU Blida in November 2018.

== Medical services ==
The EPH Sisters Bedj offers the following medical services: cardiology, internal medicine, anesthesiology, general surgery, orthopedic surgery, urologic surgery, neurosurgery, otorhinolaryngology, physical rehabilitation, and oncology.

== See also ==
- Women in the Algerian War
- Healthcare in Algeria

== Gallery ==
Images of EPH Sisters Bedj
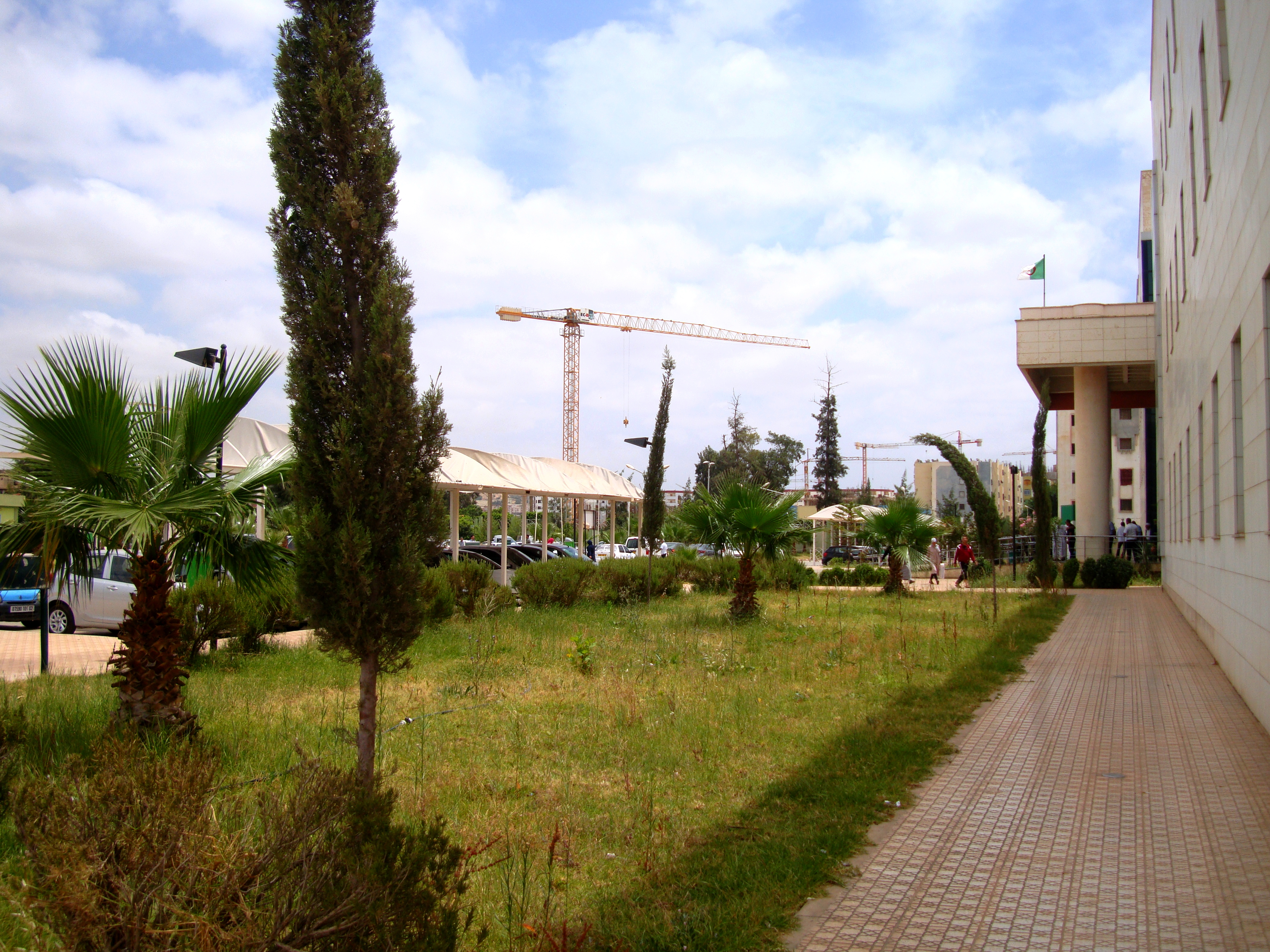
Main building

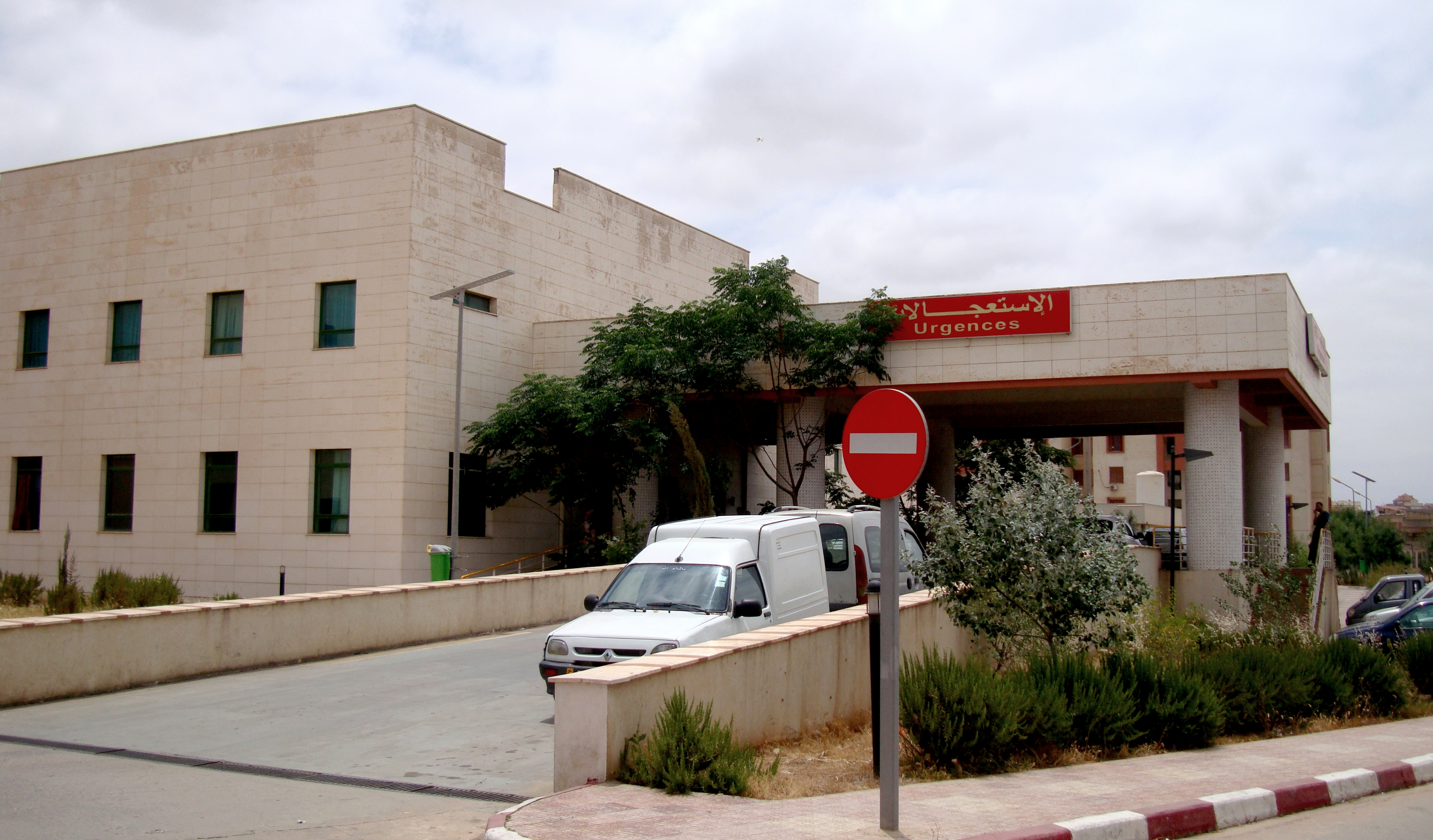
Emergency services entrance

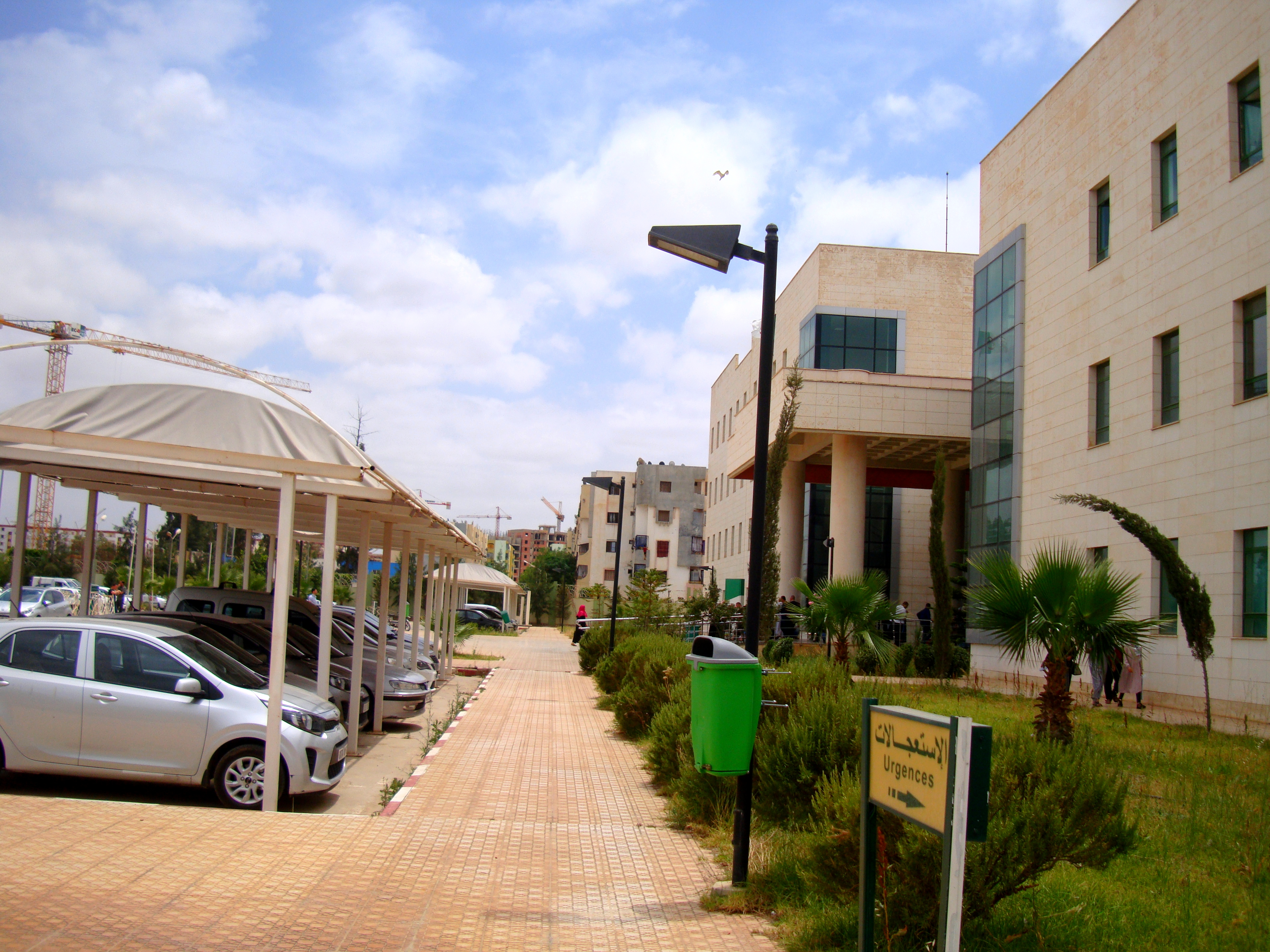
Parking lot
