= University Hospital Center of Oran =

University Hospital Center Dr. Benaouda Benzerdjeb
- Department of Health and Population of Oran

Geography
- Location: Oran, Oran, Algeria
- Coordinates: 35.693276°N 0.639028°W

Organisation
- Type: Teaching and research (CHU)
- Affiliated university: Oran 1 University

Services
- Beds: 2,922 (in 2005)

History
- Former name: St Lazare Hospital
- Founded: 1877

Links
- Website: www.dsp-oran.dz
- Lists: Hospitals in Algeria

University Hospital Center Dr. Benaouda Benzerdjeb (Arabic: المركز الإستشفائي الجامعي د. بن عودة بن زرجب, French: Centre Hospitalier Universitaire Dr Benaouda Benzerdjeb), shortly known as CHU Oran is a large research hospital affiliated with the University of Oran in Oran, Algeria with a capacity of exceeding 1000 beds, established in 1877, located in front of the Medical faculty. A new modern hospital was developed in 2003, at a cost of €120 million. The hospital is a major teaching facility of the Faculty of Medicine at the University of Oran. The original hospital was designed by noted Japanese architect Kenzō Tange, and is regarded as an example of his metabolic architecture concept. This public hospital is one of 14 hospitals designated Centre Hospitalo-Universitaire (CHU) in Algeria.

== History ==
The original hospital in the city was established in 1877 and the St Lazare Hospital moved in during April 1883. The decree n ° 57-1090 of October 3, 1957 designated it as the regional hospital of Oran. The ordinance 58-1373 of December 30, 1958, designated it as the "Hospital and University Center of Oran".

In Albert Camus’ 1947 novel “The Plague” a mysterious virus runs through the city of Oran. This has inspired comparisons with the COVID-19 pandemic in Algeria. 20 people were under intensive care in the hospital for COVID-19 in June 2020. Abdelaziz Djerad, the prime minister, visited to assess the evolution of case transmission and hospital conditions. The Algerian Minister of Health, Abderrahmane Benbouzid, toured the hospital.

In 2003, the hospital played a critical role in the control of an outbreak of bubonic plague. It formed a crisis committee with the Institut Pasteur and the World Health Organisation and through molecular diagnosis, contact tracing and rapid treatment of cases identified, and treated 18 cases of plague with one fatality.

In July 2020 the large increase in the number of cases of COVID-19 forced the hospital to turn the Physical Medicine and Occupational Rehabilitation centre into an area for Covid patients and the Department of Pediatric Urology was used for screening. 454 patients had been discharged from the hospital after recovery on 25 June since the start of the outbreak. Subsequently 300 symptomatic cases arrived in 24 hours. An RCB analysis device for the detection of COVID-19 was presented to the hospital in June 2020, a gift from Algerian doctors residing abroad. It can carry out about 16 analyzes per hour.

=== 2020 incident ===
An Algerian Raï singer, Siham El Gabouni, was arrested in July 2020 after releasing a video in which she criticised staffing levels at the Medical and Surgical Urgent Service and the dilapidated state of the hospital. She was charged by the management of the hospital center with contempt of an official institution, damage to the symbols of the national revolution, defamation and taking photos and recording without authorization. She was sentenced to 18 months in prison and fined 3,000 Algerian dinars. A 46-year-old man was later arrested for photographing medical kits in the Department of Chest Diseases in order to defame them.

== See also ==
- Ministry of Health, Population and Hospital Reform
