= Zahia Mentouri =

Algerian physician (1947–2022)

- زهية منتوري

Minister of Health and Social Affairs
- In office 22 February 1992 – 19 July 1992
- Prime Minister: Sid Ahmed Ghozali
- Preceded by: Nafissa Hamoud
- Succeeded by: Muhammed Al-Saghir Babs

Personal details
- Born: 1947 French Algeria
- Died: 12 July 2022 (aged 74–75)

Zahia Mentouri-Chentouf (Arabic: زهية منتوري, romanized: Zahiyya Mantūrī; 1947 – 12 July 2022) was an Algerian physician and government official who served as the Algerian Minister of Health and Social Affairs in 1992.

== Early life ==
Mentouri was born in 1947 in French Algeria. In 1952, her parents emigrated to France with her brother and sister, but Mentouri was left behind in Constantine in the care of her aunt and uncle. Some of Mentouri's family fought French forces during the Algerian War of Independence; an uncle and two cousins were killed by French forces. While growing up, many of Mentouri's friends were Pied-Noirs, ethnic French people who were born in Algeria. Her primary language was French, and she had little skill with Arabic.

== Career ==
Following Algerian independence in 1962, Mentouri was optimistic about Algeria's future as a socialist state, studying medicine and volunteering in healthcare in rural parts of Algeria. She also set up pediatric intensive care units in several Algerian cities. Mentouri was later appointed rector of Annaba University, where she established a school of medicine.

On 22 February 1992, Mentouri was appointed the Minister of Health and Social Affairs in the government of Prime Minister Sid Ahmed Ghozali. During her time as minister, Mentouri helped enact new legislation which would designate public health as a national priority. However, during the Algerian Civil War, President Mohamed Boudiaf was assassinated on 29 June 1992; as a result, Ghozali's government was dissolved, with Mentouri resigning as health minister on 19 July 1992, before she could accomplish her ambition of instituting free healthcare in Algeria.

After Mentouri refused to establish an Islamist university, she began receiving death threats, forcing her to flee from Algiers; she later changed her name and settled in a small town, where she worked at a local hospital. Sometime during the 1990s, a 7-year-old girl whose throat was slit was brought into Mentouri's ICU; her family had all been killed by an Islamic Salvation Front militia, but she survived. After an 8-month stay in Mentouri's ICU, she was adopted by Mentouri and her husband.

After the end of the civil war, Mentouri moved to Oran, where she became a professor of anesthesia and resuscitation at the University of Oran. Mentouri was also a researcher for the National Agency for the Development of Health Research, organized the African Conference on Health Research, and served as director of the Thematic Agency for Research and Health Science. Mentouri is credited with "training all pediatric anesthetists in the west of the country".

Mentouri died on 12 July 2022.
