= 20 August 1955 Stadium (Algiers) =

Sports venue in Algiers, Algeria

Coordinates: 36°44′44″N 3°04′43″E

20 August Stadium
- El Cousina
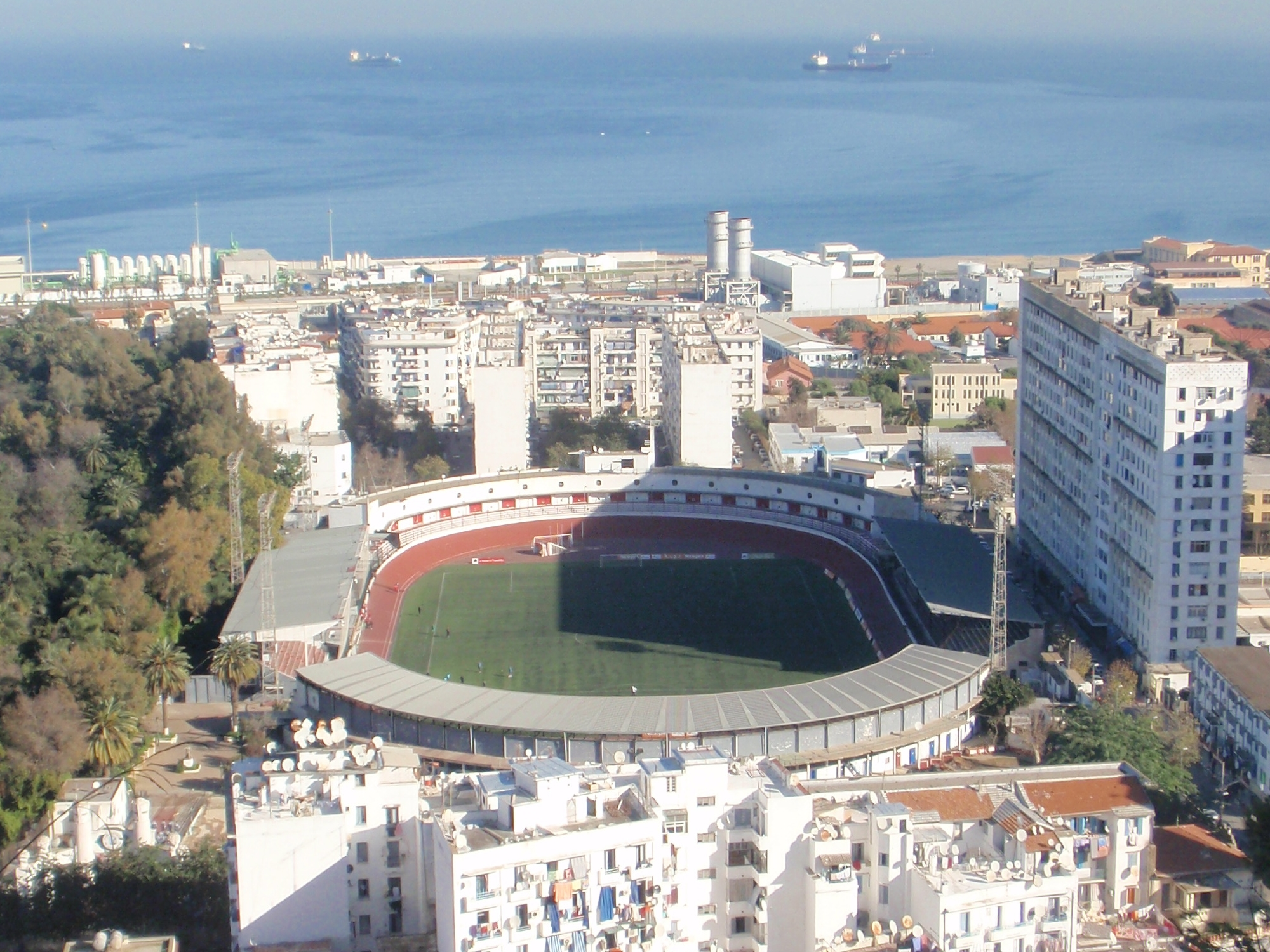
- Interactive map of 20 August Stadium
- Full name: 20 August 1955 Stadium
- Former names: Stade Municipal; Stade El-Annasser
- Operator: APC Mohamed Belouizdad
- Capacity: 15,000
- Surface: Artificial turf

Construction
- Opened: 1930

Tenants
- CR Belouizdad; NA Hussein Dey; OMR El Annasser

20 August 1955 Stadium (Arabic: ملعب 20 أوت 1955, French: Stade du 20 Août 1955) is a multi-purpose stadium in Mohamed Belouizdad, Algiers, Algeria. It is currently used for football matches and is the home stadium of CR Belouizdad. The venue has a capacity of 15,000.

== History ==
20 August 1955 Stadium was opened during the French colonial era in 1930. The stadium hosted the relay competitions for the 1975 Mediterranean Games, and the 1978 All-Africa Games. The venue, along with Omar Hamadi Stadium and Mohamed Benhaddad Stadium in Algiers, was left by France after Algeria gained independence. It was previously the stadium where Algeria received its guests before the opening of Stade du 5 Juillet in 1972 during the reign of President Houari Boumediene, which became the home of the Algeria national football team, the Greens.

The Greens, in their 10-year residency, only suffered three losses, two against Tunisia in an official match and one FC Nantes in a friendly match. Their last game in the stadium occurred on 21 March 1971 against Mali, which resulted in a tie with two goals in each net during the qualifications for the Munich Olympics.

== Accidents ==
On November 26, 1982, during the 7th round of the national championship between NA Hussein Dey and MC Alger, a record attendance of supporters attended to watch the stars of the “Gijon” epic after the 1982 FIFA World Cup. Due to the record attendance, the side stands of the stadium collapsed, resulting in the death of ten supporters and the injuries of more than 500. This incident is one of the deadliest tragedies that Algerian stadiums have encountered since Algerian independence.

On August 22, 2019, Algerian singer and rapper Soolking held a concert which was attended by more than 30 thousand fans. He was accompanied by a group of artists, namely L'Algérino, Fianso, Alonzo and Dhurata Dora. Whilst entering the stadium, five people died due to a stampede, and 32 were injured. The five victims, with ages ranging from 13 to 21, died during transfer to Mustapha Pacha hospital (CHU). According to Soolking, if he had known what happened, he would have cancelled the concert immediately. The main cause of the accident was overselling. More tickets were sold than the stadium capacity. The accident resulted in the dismissals of the director of the National Copyright Office, the organizer of the event, the head of the national police and the Minister of Culture.
