= Health in Algeria =

Algeria is the largest country in Africa and is estimated to have a population of around 46,278,751 people. Algeria has a public health care system, which is accessible and free of charge to all citizens of Algeria. The public health care system is financed by the government of Algeria. Given Algeria's young population, policy favors preventive health care and clinics over hospitals. In keeping with this policy, the government maintains an intensive immunization programme and a policy which allows Algerian citizens health care for Hospitalisations, medicines and outpatient care free to all citizens of Algeria.

Algeria became a member of the World Health Organization on November 8, 1962.

Algeria is facing an exodus of its qualified doctors to Europe, particularly France.

The Human Rights Measurement Initiative finds that Algeria is fulfilling 83.8% of what it should be fulfilling for the right to health based on its level of income. When looking at the right to health with respect to children, Algeria achieves 93.7% of what is expected based on its current income. In regards to the right to health amongst the adult population, the country achieves 95.5% of what is expected based on the nation's level of income. Algeria falls into the "very bad" category when evaluating the right to reproductive health because the nation is fulfilling only 62.1% of what the nation is expected to achieve based on the resources (income) it has available.

== Public healthcare system ==
At the change of Algeria's independence in 1962, The Algerian health care system was very minor consisting of 1 physician per 33,000 people, estimated 300 doctors in all and one trained paramedic per 40,000 people. The country has made major changes and progresses in its policies and systems in health care. From 1975 onward, the Algerian government introduced a free national health care system. Hospital treatment, medications, and outpatient care became free to all citizens of Algeria. The national medical insurance scheme covers 90% of the entire population. The Algerian government decided to invest in government run expansive health care centres and clinics instead of investing in expensive hospitals. The health care facilities and medical equipment varies in size depending on the size of local population. Remote areas tend to get more rudimentary medical services. The Algerian government had a 4-year plan from 2010 to 2014, which was expected to spend €5.7bn in health care which a majority of the fund directed in the establishment of over 1,500 health care facilities all over Algeria. by 2015 the Algerian government had allocated €4.85bn to build 10 hospitals and renovate old ones. The Algerian government is investing in human resources by creating 58,000 jobs in nursing, doctors and health care assistants. The Algerian government is dedicating increased funds into increasing the amount of resources that the health care sector needs to develop their new facilities. This funding will go into new medical equipment and improved hospital capacity capabilities.

== Private health system ==
The private health sectors in Algeria is a non government run health care system which citizens must pay for their services. The private health care sector had developed quickly to fill the gaps that the government public health care system had left. Private medical care is very limited as their services are not covered by the public health care system and only a few Algerians can afford to pay out of pocket payments for their own medical treatments. Patients that seek to use the private health system will pay large amounts of out of pocket fees and enjoy quality of service that only a few can afford. A private health insurance system does not yet exist in Algeria. Private medical facilities are becoming more common in Algeria with in 2015, 250 private clinics operating with many more planned and being built.

== Poverty and hunger ==
Algeria is emerging from a several year internal conflict that had effected the nation into deep poverty and unemployment in rural areas. The rural poverty is closely related to the lack of income and employment. Due to the poverty families in these rural areas find it hard to afford basic food needs. Since 1986 the United Nations WFP (world food Program) has helped provide basic food needs to the people in need in Algeria. The role of WFP's food assistance is to help the families and those who need help to meet basic food and nutritional needs. Dry food baskets provided consist of cereals (wheat flour, rice and barley), pulses (lentils, beans and chick peas), sugar, vegetable oil and blended food. The united nations WPA Algeria runs from 1 January 2013 to 31 December 2015 with a total budget of US$66 Million. WFP find it hard to find products for the prevention and treatment of malnutrition due to funding.

== Health statuses and issues ==
=== Life expectancy ===
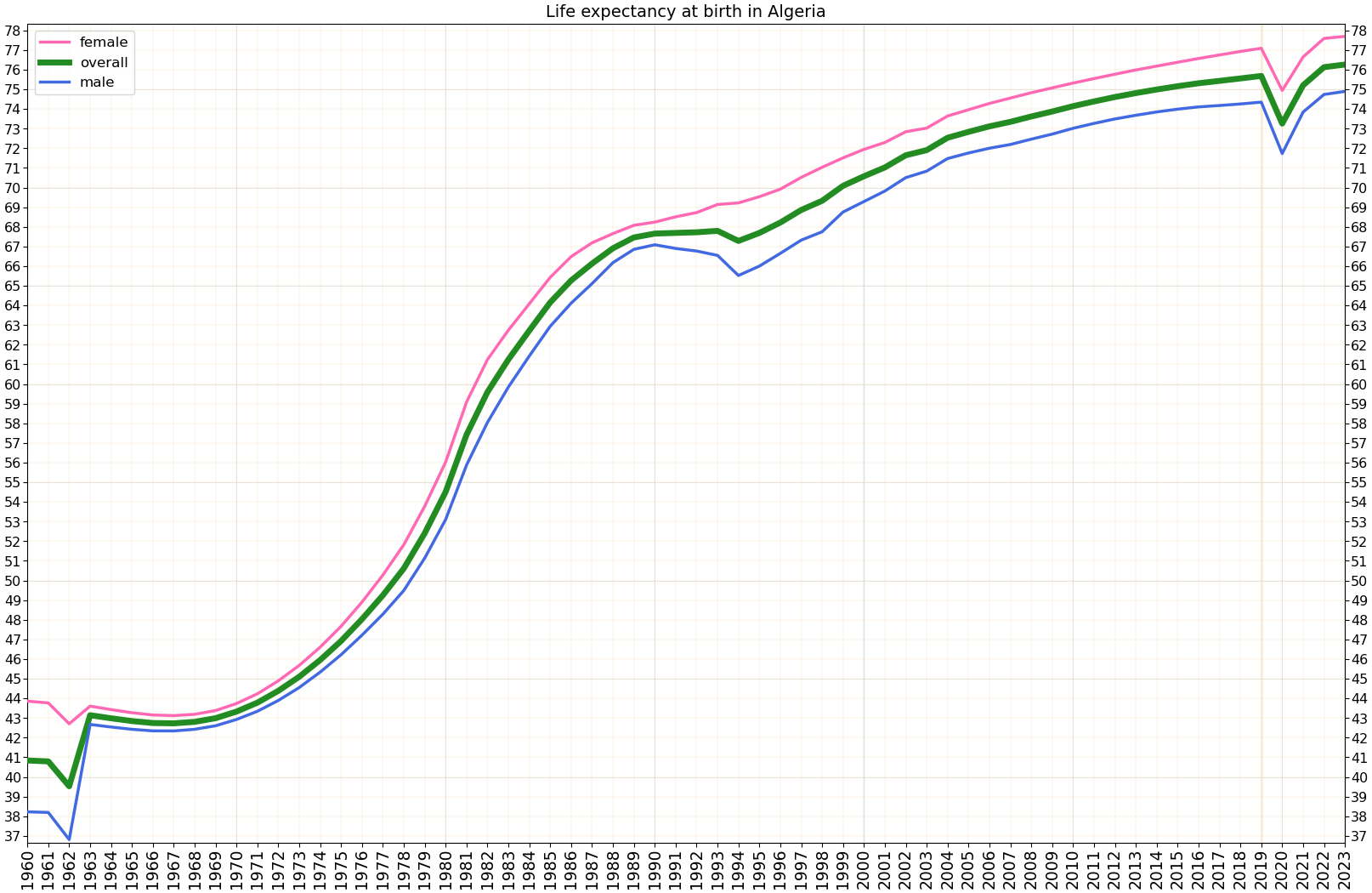
Life expectancy at birth in Algeria

According to the World Health Organization, life expectancy in Algeria in males was 70.3 years of age and females 73.5 with a total life expectancy of 71.8. Giving Algeria a world life expectancy ranking of 103. In 2020 Algeria's life expectancy increased with males having a life expectancy of 76.95 years of age and females 77.96 years of age. The total life expectancy being 76.59 years of age.

=== Smoking ===
As of 2015, 45 people died every day in Algeria from serious diseases caused by smoking, according to Pr Salim Nafti, president of the Algerian Society of Pneumophtisiology, who works at the Mustapha Pacha hospital. As of 2023, according to the Tobacco Atlas, an estimated 27,964 people died annually from smoking-related causes, accounting for 12.03% of all deaths in the country in 2023. In 2022, Algeria had approximately 4.8 million adult smokers, including 4.72 million men and 84,000 women. The adult smoking prevalence was estimated at 9.7% in 2025, while 5.76% of children aged 10–14 were estimated to smoke in 2023. The Algerian law has a lack of firmness on laws regarding on the sale and distribution of cigarettes with a lack of enforcement. In 2010, 11.2% males deaths and 1.3% female deaths were a result of a smoking-related death. With children smoking in Algeria, 18% more boys smoke in Algeria than the average in middle-income countries.

=== Diseases ===
Diabetes in Algeria has become a widespread severe health issue. Diabetes in Algeria has increased from 6.8% in 1990, 8.9% in 2003, 12.29% in 2005, 13.8% in 2010. Currently 10.5% in 2016 with 10.2% males and 10.7% females. In 2014 there were over 1.6 million cases of diabetes with 14,044 Adult deaths in Algeria. (International Diabetes Federation) It is predominantly most common in 35–70 year olds, which consist of a large segment of the working population. The transition from the traditional life style to a more westernised is one of the major explanatory factors behind the rapid progression of diabetes in Algeria.

== See also ==
- Healthcare in Algeria
