= Abdelhak Saihi =

Algerian politician

Abelhak Saihi
- عبد الحق سايحي
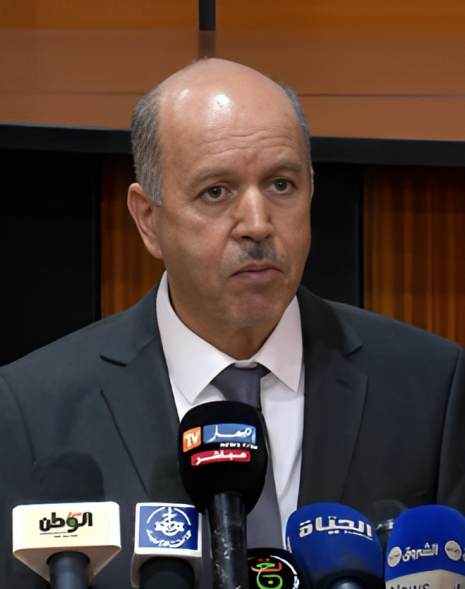
- Saihi in 2023

Minister of Health, Population and Hospital Reform
- Incumbent
- Assumed office 9 September 2022
- President: Abdelmadjid Tebboune
- Prime Minister: Aymen Benabderrahmane; Nadir Larbaoui
- Preceded by: Abderrahmane Benbouzid

Abelhak Saihi is the Algerian Minister of Health, Population and Hospital Reform. He was appointed as minister on 9 September 2022.
