= National Agency for the Digitization of Health Care =

National Agency for the Digitization of Health (ANNS) (Arabic, الوكالة الوطنية للرقمنة في الصحة), is a public industrial and commercial establishment (EPIC) created in 2022 by the Algerian Ministry of Health with the aim of having better visibility and collecting data on the situation of the health sector, particularly with regard to the state of stocks and the management of human resources.

== Creation ==
Algerian Minister of Health Abderrahmane Benbouzid announced the creation of a digitalization agency to gain better visibility and collect data on the situation of the sector. The minister also stressed the importance of the state's financial efforts for the development of the sector and mentioned a coordination problem that could be solved by digitalizing the sector, this agency had been proposed as an idea after the COVID-19 pandemic.

Minister Benbouzid announced that Prime Minister Aïmene Benabderrahmane had approved the creation of an official national health digitalization agency, with a scientific and administrative council that will work on the digitalization of human resources and medicine stocks. He stressed the importance of digitalization to improve the situation of the sector and avoid future mistakes, adding that without digitalization, the operation will continue in the dark.

== Mission ==
As a public service agency, the ANNS's mission is to place the patient at the center of its concerns by contributing to their social, economic and human well-being. To achieve this objective, the agency adopts modern and efficient management that guarantees the best possible service by controlling costs and creating value. The ANNS operates within the framework of the principle of continuous improvement while respecting its regulatory attributions.
