= Centre Hospitalo-Universitaire Béjaïa =

CHU Béjaïa
- Béjaïa Directorate of Health and Population

Geography
- Location: Béjaïa, Béjaïa Province, Algeria
- Coordinates: 36.75045620250215°N 5.040717410579489°E

Organisation
- Type: Teaching, CHU
- Affiliated university: University of Béjaïa

Services
- Beds: 514

History
- Opened: 2009

Links
- Website: www.dsp-bejaia.dz
- Lists: Hospitals in Algeria

The Centre Hospitalo-Universitaire Béjaïa is a public university teaching hospital center (CHU) in Béjaïa, Béjaïa Province, Algeria. It is one of 15 public University Hospital Centers (French: Centre Hospitalo-Universitaire or CHU) under the Béjaïa Department of Health and Population in the Algerian Ministry of Health, Population and Hospital Modernization. It is affiliated with the University of Béjaïa. The Center includes three hospitals: Frantz Fanon Hospital with 114 beds, Khelil Amrane Hospital with 205 beds, and Targa Ouzemmour Hospital of obstetric gynecology with 106 beds.

== History ==
The CHU Béjaia was created by Algerian Presidential executive decree Number 2009–319 on October 6, 2009, supplementing the list of university hospital centers annexed to executive decree Number 1997–467 on December 23, 1997, setting the rules for the creation, organization and operation of university hospital centers. This decree set up three hospitals in the CHU Béjaia, namely:

- Khelil Amrane Hospital (Route de l'Hôpital, Béjaïa 06000, Algeria; 36.754279°N 5.05027329°E); namesake: Chahid Khelil Amrane
- Frantz Fanon Hospital (Rue Frères Arbouche, Béjaïa 06000, Algeria; 36.7562273°N 5.083458°E); namesake: Frantz Fanon
- Tergha Ouzemmour Hospital (Q22W+VF Béjaïa, Algeria; 36.75236320154377°N 5.046279270118089°E)

These three hospitals are affiliated with the school of medicine of the University of Bejaia (in Targa Ouzemour, Béjaïa, Algeria 36.75045620250215°N 5.040717410579489°E). There is also a Blood Transfusion Center associated with the CHU (36.722979794856016°N 5.068183975941541°E)

== Medical services ==
These three hospitals have departments that provide 22 medical specialties. Medical students train in these hospitals at both the undergraduate and graduate levels.

Khelil Armane Hospital 204 beds available
Services	beds
Anesthesiology	20
Cardiology	28
General surgery	40
Epidemiology and Preventive healthcare	
Gastroenterology	16
Central laboratory	
Infectious diseases	28
Internal medicine	16
Neurosurgery	40
Orthopedic traumatology	
Emergency medicine and surgery	20

Frantz Fanon Hospital 105 beds available
Services	beds
Pathology and Anatomy	
Maxillofacial	10
Occupational Medicine	
Forensic medicine	
Nephrology Hemodialysis	16
Otorhinolaryngology	16
Pulmonology and phthisiology	42
Psychiatry	26

Tergha Ouzemour Hospital 105 beds available
Services	beds
Obstetrics and gynecology	65
Pediatrics	24
