= Yahia Kaidum =

Algerian minister for health and population

Yahia Kaidum was the Algerian minister for health and population in the 1995 government of Mokdad Sifi.
