= University Lounici Ali of Blida =

University in Algeria

University of Blida 2
- Arabic: جامعة البليدة 2 French: Université de Blida 2
- Other names: University Lounici Ali of Blida; Arabic: جامعة لونيسي علي; French: Université Lounici Ali de Blida
- Type: Public university
- Established: April 15, 2013
- Students: 32,000
- Undergraduates: Bachelor's
- Postgraduates: Master's, Doctorate
- Location: El Affroun, Blida Province, Algeria; 36.45°N 2.6402778°E
- Campus: El Affroun University Campus
- Language: Arabic, French, English, Italian
- Website: univ-blida2.dz

University Lounici Ali of Blida, also known as University of Blida 2 (commonly referred to as "University of El Affroun" (Arabic: جامعة العفرون)), is a public university in El Affroun, Blida Province, northern Algeria.

Established by Executive Decree No. 13-162 on April 15, 2013, which split the University of Blida, creating the University of Blida 1 alongside the University of Blida 2, it is named after Ali Lounici, a former captain of the ALN.

== History ==
A new university campus with several university residences was constructed in El Affroun. It partially opened for the academic year 2011/2012, initially as an annex of the University of Blida, Saâd Dahlab.

For the academic year 2013/2014, the University of Blida was divided into two independent universities: University of Blida 2 was officially established and became independent from the former University of Blida, Saâd Dahlab, now known as University of Blida 1.

University of Blida 2 was inaugurated in May 2014 at the new El Affroun site and named "University Lounici Ali".

== Organization ==
Faculties at University of Blida 2 include:

- Faculty of Letters and Languages
- Faculty of Humanities and Social Sciences
- Faculty of Law and Political Science
- Faculty of Economics, Commercial Sciences, and Management Sciences

== Gallery ==
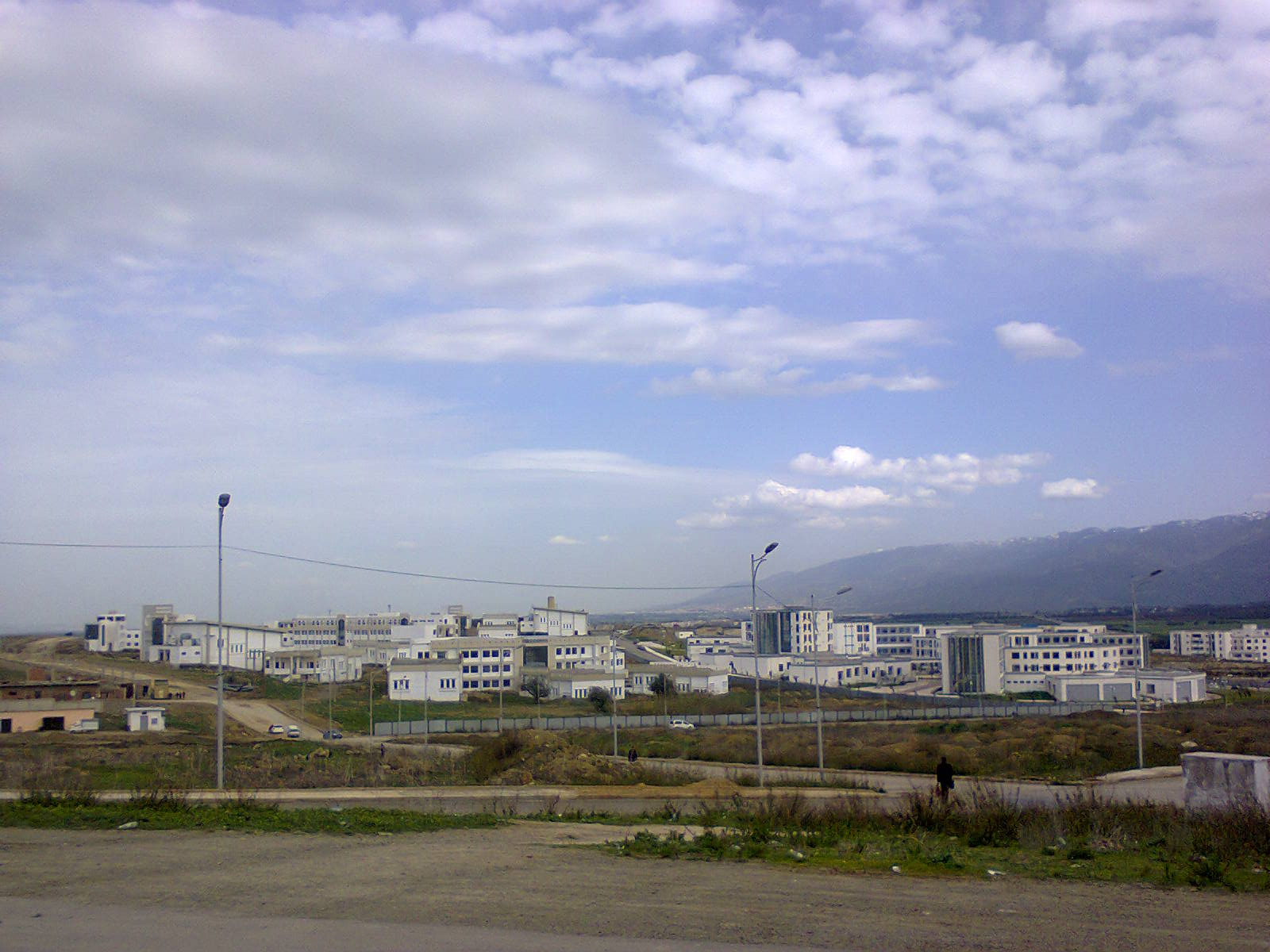
General view of the El Affroun annex under construction in 2012

== See Also ==
- Blida 1 University (also known as University Saad Dahlab of Blida)
