= Jeanine Belkhodja =

Algerian doctor and activist (1928–2013)

- Born: 2 April 1928; Algiers, French Algeria
- Died: 27 October 2013 (aged 85); 13th arrondissement of Paris, France
- Employer: Mustapha Pacha hospital
- Organization(s): National Liberation Front (Algeria); Union of Algerian Women (UNFA); National Economic and Social Council (CNES)
- Political party: Algerian Communist Party

Jeanine Nadjia Belkhodja (2 April 1928 – 27 October 2013) was an Algerian doctor, communist and National Liberation Front (Algeria) activist during the Algerian War. She later became a professor of obstetrics and gynaecology at Mustapha Pacha hospital in Algiers.

== Biography ==
Jeanine Nadjia Belkhodja was born on 2 April 1928 in Algiers, French Algeria to a mixed family. Her mother was a Corsican French immigrant to Algeria and her father was from a Kabylie family that had converted to Catholicism. She was a practicing Catholic.

Belkhodja enrolled as one of the first medical students at the Faculty of Algiers, where she was socially perceived as a Muslim. As a student she became a communist, alongside activists including Josette Audin [fr], Maurice Audin and Daniel Timsit [fr]. She became an active member of the Algerian Communist Party (PCA), elected to student leadership.

Belkhodja completed her medical degree in 1955. After graduating she undertook voluntary medical work with the Algerian Youth Association for Social Action with Pierre Chaulet, Alice Cherki and André Mandouze.

Belkhodja joined the National Liberation Front (FLN) to fight for Algerian independence from France during the Algerian War, sending medicines and leaflets to the resistance movement in oil drums via the Tamzali brothers. She was arrested on 14 March 1957 by the "Green Berets." She was tortured at Villa Susini and was imprisoned in Barberouusse Prison. At her trial, Belkhodja was accused of making explosives, was given a 5-year suspended prison sentence and was exiled to France. Belkhodja instead travelled to Tunisia, where she joined with the FLN and treated Algerian djounouds (fighters) and refugees at the Seddiki Hospital and on the Algeria-Tunisia border within the framework of the provisional government of the Algerian Republic. In 1959, she created a centre for demobilised djounouds.

Upon Algerian independence, Belkhodja returned to Algeria in 1962. She was sent to the Provisional Executive and joined the 2nd Autonomous Zone of Algiers, under Ali Lounici and Boualem Oussedik. She later practiced medicine at the Mustapha Bacha hospital in Algiers and became a professor of obstetrics and gynaecology.

Belkhodja became an activist in the Union of Algerian Women (UNFA) and was able to dispense contraceptives though the UNFA's family planning group under the pretext of scientific research. She was also a member of the National Economic and Social Council (CNES).

Belkhodja died on 27 October 2013 in the 13th arrondissement of Paris, France. Her body was returned to Algeria and she was buried at the Sidi M'Hamed cemetery.
