= Mustapha Pacha hospital =

Centre Hospitalo-Universitair Mustapha d'Alger (CHUMA)
- Ministry of Health, Population and Hospital Reform
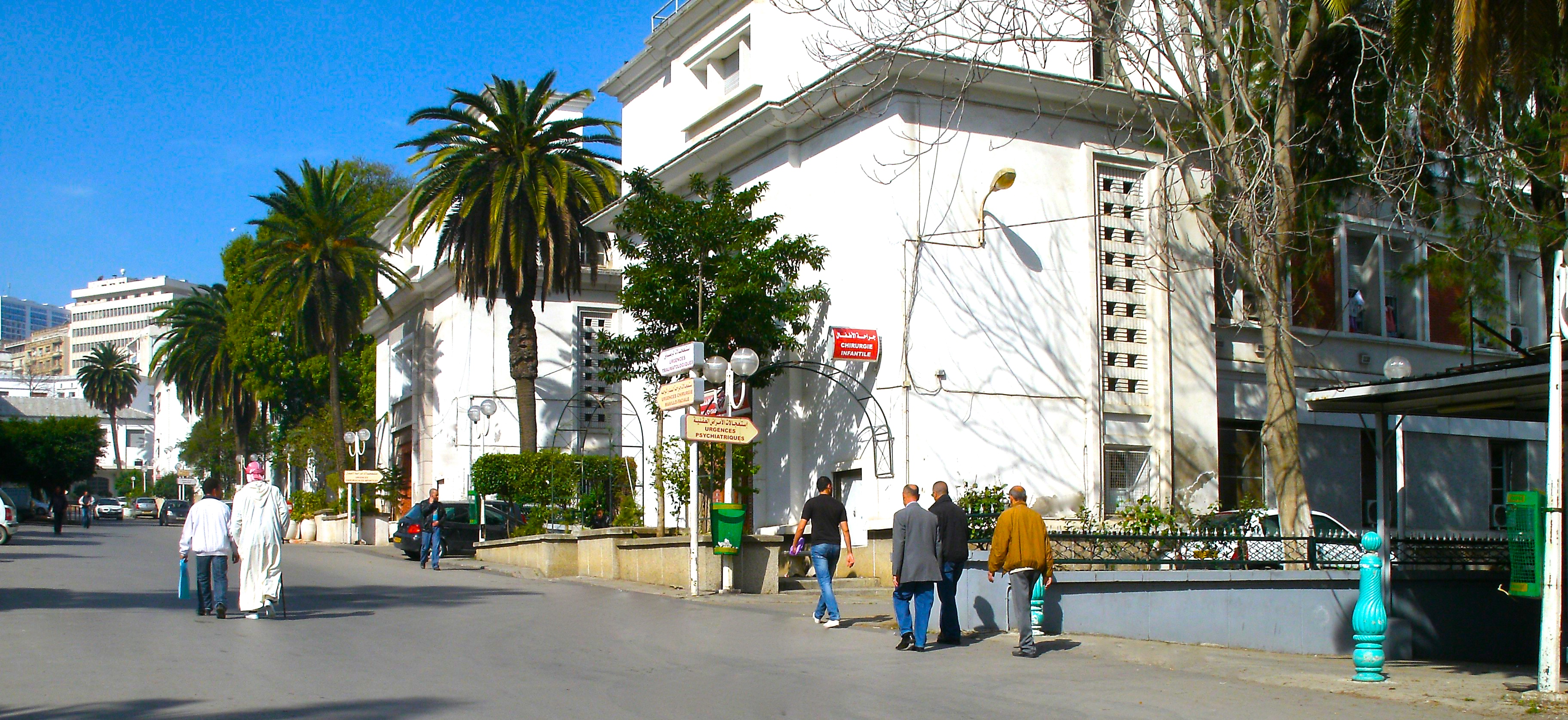
- Entrance to the hospital.

Geography
- Location: Sidi M'Hamed, Algiers Province, Algeria
- Coordinates: 36.762207368724354°N 3.0534096682635736°E

Organisation
- Type: Teaching, Centre Hospitalo-Universitaire (CHU)
- Affiliated university: Algiers 1 University

Services
- Beds: 1,500

History
- Founded: August 1, 1854

Links
- Website: www.chu-mustapha.dz
- Lists: Hospitals in Algeria

Centre Hospitalo-Universitair Mustapha Pacha (French: Centre Hospitalo-Universitaire Mustapha d'Alge) was founded in 1854 in the town of Moustapha (now Sidi M'Hamed) and is the largest hospital in Algeria.

This hospital center is one of 14 Centre Hospitalo-Universitair under the Algerian Ministry of Health, Population and Hospital Reform.

== History ==
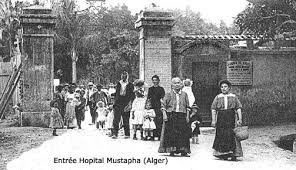
Entrance to hospital before 1900

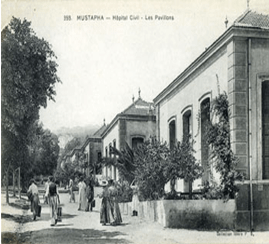
Mustapha Pacha Hospital in summer of 1883

The hospital was established by a legacy of a rich settler named Fortin, a native of Ivry, in the city of Algiers. In his will of 19 September 1840, he donated a sum of 1.2 million francs for the erection of a civilian hospital in Mustapha.

At its inception in 1854, it was a military hospital with a barracks on 8 hectares. On 21 May 1855, the civilian doctors courses were open to students, and on 18 January 1859, official courses were inaugurated in the framework of the new School of Medicine of Algiers founded in 1857.

After 1877, 14 pavilions were built to plans by the architect Jules Voinot. The first services were those of Pediatrics in 1883 and obstetrics in 1884. It was decided in 1920 to expand the hospital. The number of pavilions was doubled by 1930. There has been continual expansion since then.

=== Namesake ===
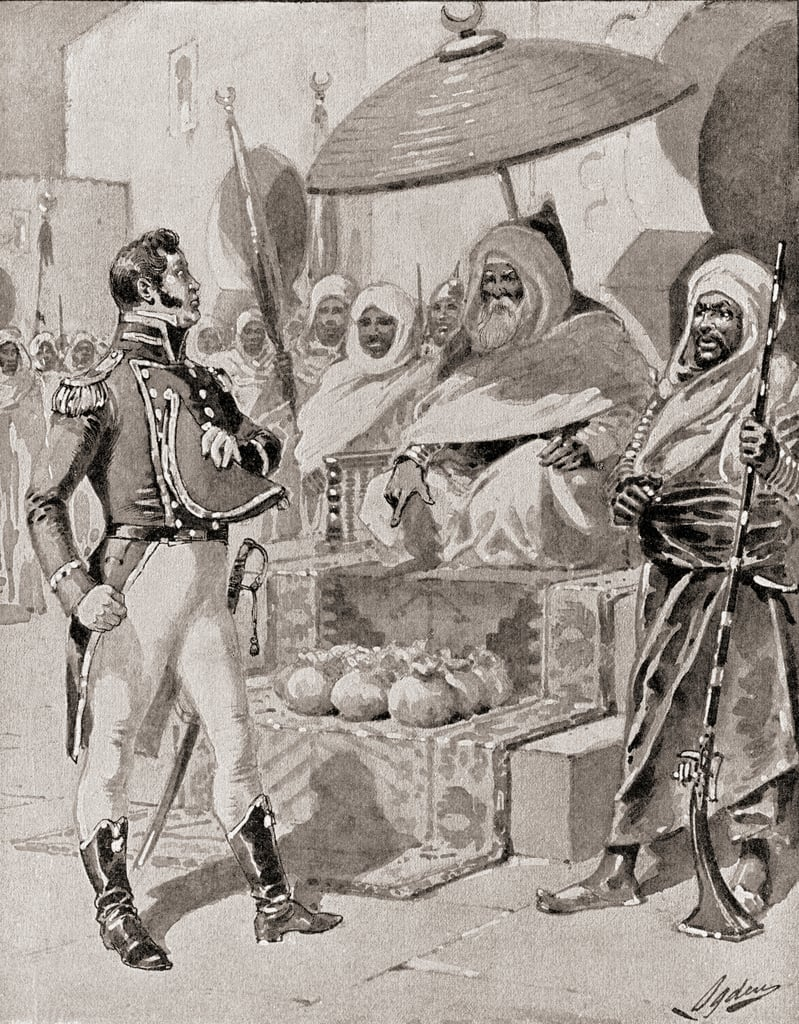
Captain Bainbridge pays tribute to the Dey.

Mustapha Pacha, Mustapha VI ben Brahim Pasha (Arabic : مصطفى بن ابراهيم باشا ), or Mustafa ben Brahim was dey of Algiers between May 1798 and the August 31, 1805, date of his assassination by a Janissary.

== Services ==
The hospital provides the following services:

- Dermatology and Venereology
- Diabetology
- Gastroenterology
- Forensic Medicine
- Hepatology
- Immunology
- Neonatology
- Neurology Department
- Ophthalmology
- Oral pathology and Oral surgery
- Parasitology and Mycology
- Periodontology
- Physical medicine and rehabilitation
- Surgical Clinics
- Thoracic surgery

== Renowned professors and students ==
- Jean Baptiste Paulin Trolard (1869), anatomist
- Jules Aimé Battandier (1876), botanist
- Louis Charles Trabut (1880), doctor and botanist
- Omar Boudjellab (1970), cardiologist
- Tedjini Haddam (1970), thoracic surgeon
- Jeanine Belkhodja, obstetrician and gynaecologist
