= Centre hospitalier universitaire de Sherbrooke =

Hospital in Sherbrooke, Quebec, Canada

Coordinates: 45.4477°N 71.8687°W

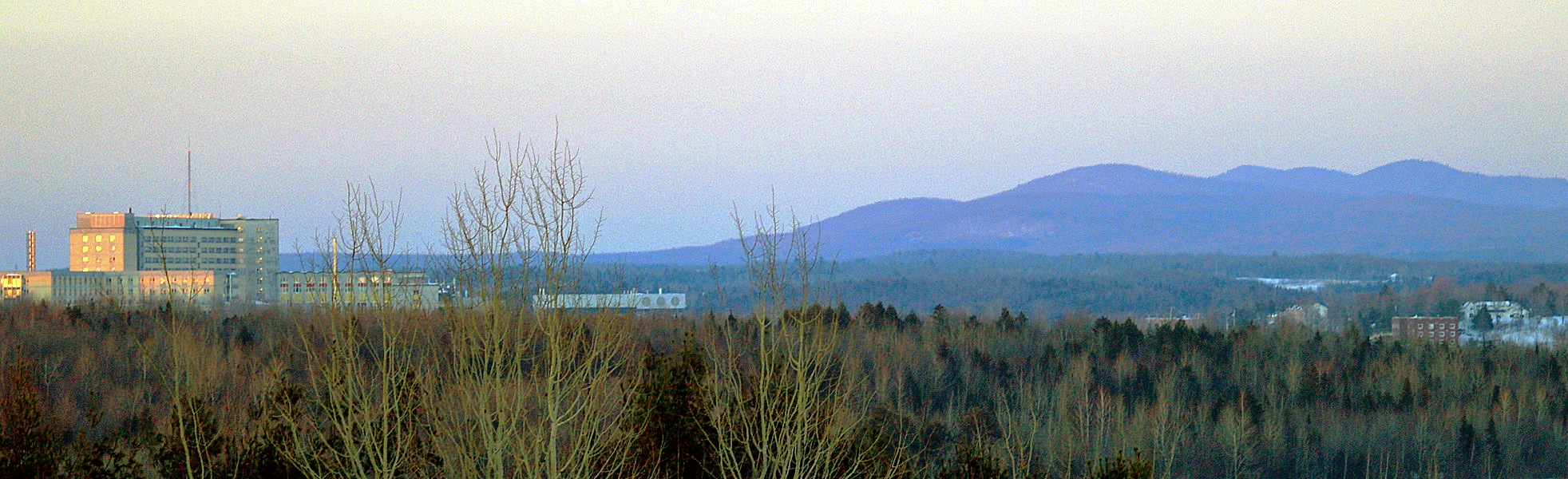

Geography
- Location: 3001, 12e avenue Nord; Sherbrooke, Quebec; J1H 5N4

Organisation
- Care system: Medicare
- Type: Teaching hospital
- Affiliated university: Université de Sherbrooke

Services
- Emergency department: II
- Beds: 690

History
- Founded: 1969

Links
- Website: http://www.chus.qc.ca

The Centre hospitalier universitaire de Sherbrooke (CHUS) is the public healthcare network in Sherbrooke, Quebec, Canada, affiliated with the Université de Sherbrooke Faculty of Medecine.

The CHUS offers general, specialized and sub-specialized medicine and is the teaching hospital in the administrative regions of Estrie, Centre-du-Québec, and the eastern portion of the Montérégie. It is also the center of reference in quaternary gamma knife radiosurgery for Quebec and Eastern Canada. With 6,244 employees, 649 doctors and pharmacists, and more than 3,700 students, the CHUS is an academic and economic hub in southeastern Quebec and is the second largest employer in the Estrie region.

== CHUS affiliated hospitals ==
- CHUS – Hôtel-Dieu
- CHUS – Hôpital Fleurimont
