= Oran University 1 =

University in Oran, Algeria

- جامعة وهران 1 – أحمد بن بلة
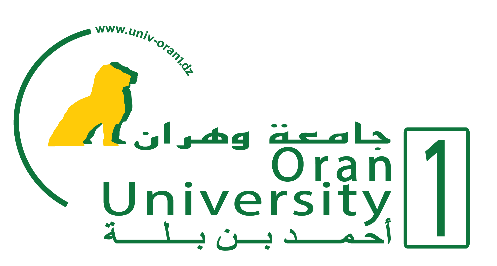
- Type: Public
- Established: 1967
- President: Prof Abdelmalek AMINE
- Total staff: 1386
- Students: 26,400
- Undergraduates: 20,958
- Postgraduates: 5442
- Location: Oran, Oran, Algeria
- Campus: Urban, suburban
- Website: https://www.univ-oran1.dz/

The Oran University 1 Ahmed Ben Bella (Arabic: جامعة وهران 1 أحمد بن بلة, French: Université d'Oran 1 Ahmed Ben Bella), formally known as Es Senia University, is a university located in Es Sénia in the south suburb of Oran in the wilaya of Oran. It was established in November 1961 as part of the University of Algiers. On April 13, 1965, it was made a separate campus, and on December 20, 1967, it became an independent university. It was the first university established after the independence of Algeria.

== Library ==
The library holds 200,000 volumes.

== See also ==
- List of universities in Algeria
- University Hospital of Oran
