= Blida 1 University =

University in Blida, Algeria

Coordinates: 36.50417°N 2.875°E

University of Blida 1
- جامعة بليدة 1 (Arabic); Université de Blida 1 (French)
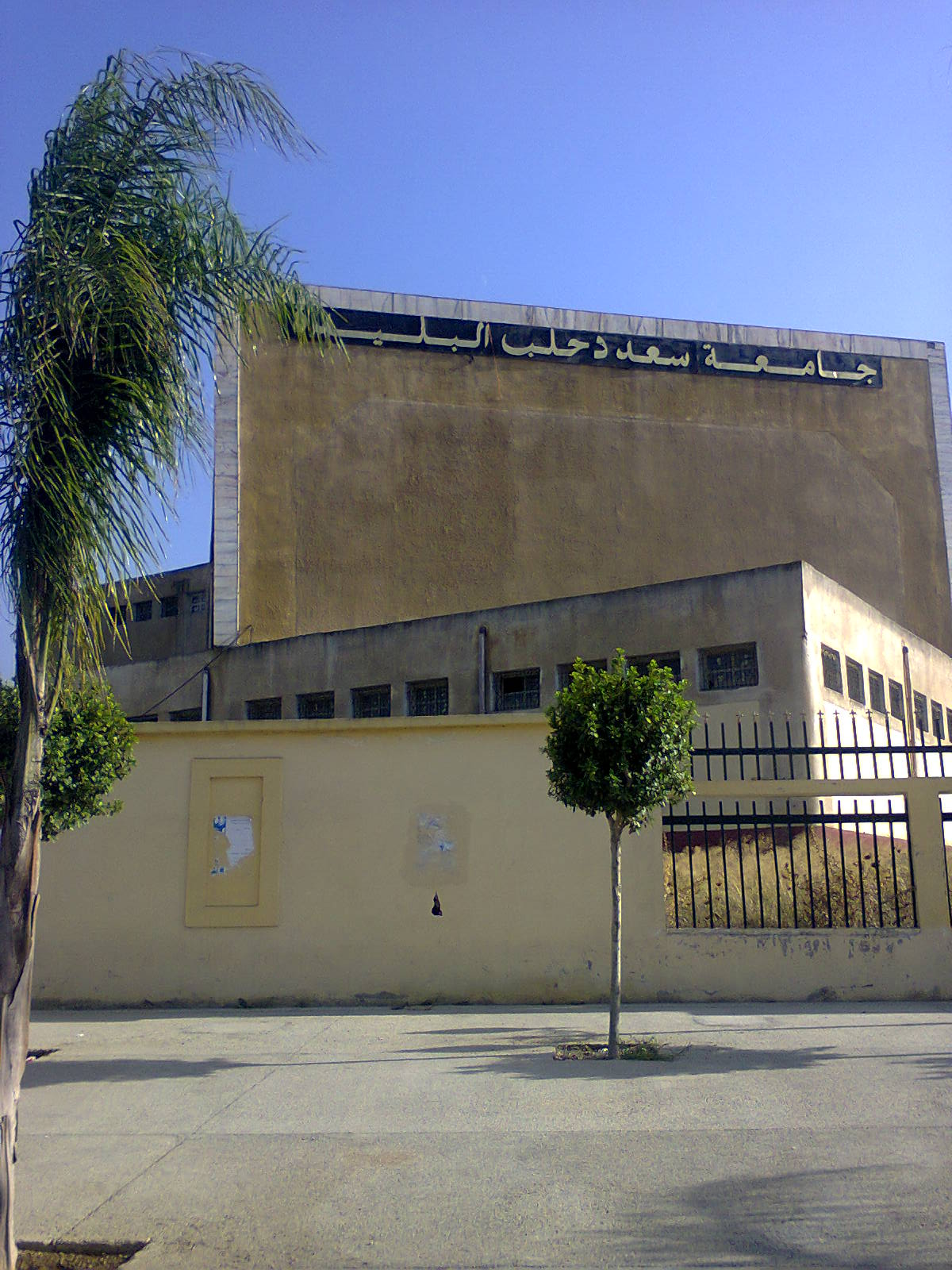
- Other names: جامعة سعد دحلب بالبليدة (Arabic); Univérsité Saad Dahlab Blida (French)
- Former names: جامعة بليدة (Arabic); Université de Blida (French)
- Type: Public
- Established: 1 August 1981
- Location: Blida, Algeria
- Campus: Urban
- Language: French, English
- Nickname: USDB
- Website: University website

The University of Blida 1 (Arabic: جامعة بليدة 1; French: Université de Blida 1), also known as University Saad Dahlab of Blida (Arabic: جامعة سعد دحلب بالبليدة; French: Univérsité Saad Dahlab Blida), is a public university located in Blida, Algeria. Founded on June 20, 1977 and named after Saad Dahlab, a former Algerian political, the university did not commence operation until four years later on 8 September, 1981.

The University of Blida 1 ranked 9th in Algeria, 4788th in the global 2026 rating, and scored in the Top 50% across 35 research topics. The University of Blida 1's ranking is based on 3 factors: research output (EduRank's index has 4,642 academic publications and 32,116 citations attributed to the university), non-academic reputation, and the impact of notable alumni.

== History ==
=== Founding ===
The University Center of Blida (Arabic: المركز الجامعي بالبليدة, French: Centre Universitaire de Blida) was initially founded on 20 June, 1977, but only began accepting student enrollments four years later on 8 September, 1981. It employed 57 professors and recorded 526 student enrollments in its first year. The university center became the first in Blida to be transformed into a university, following an executive decree on 1 August 1989.

=== Split ===
On 15 April, 2013, following an executive decree, the University of Blida was split into two independent institutions: the University of Blida 1 and the University of Blida 2. The faculties for literature, law, economy, linguistics, anthropology, and social studies were transferred over to the University of Blida 2.

The University of Blida 2 is also known as the University Lounici Ali of Blida (Arabic: جامعة لونيسي علي, French: Université Lounici Ali de Blida), named after Ali Louinci, a former captain of the National Liberation Army.

== Structure ==
The university consists of four faculties and four institutes.

=== Faculties ===
- Faculty of Sciences
- Faculty of Natural and Life Sciences
- Faculty of Technology
- Faculty of Medicine

=== Academies ===
- Institute of Veterinary Sciences
- Institute of Aviation and Space Studies
- Institute of Engineering and Construction
- Institute for Applied Sciences and Technologies

The University of Blida hosts international students in all of its schools and institutes.

== See also ==
- Blida 2 University (also known as University Lounici Ali of Blida)
- List of universities in Algeria
