= University of Béjaïa =

University in Béjaïa, Algeria

- جامعة بجاية (in Arabic); Tasdawit n Bgayet (in Berber languages); Université de Béjaïa (in French)
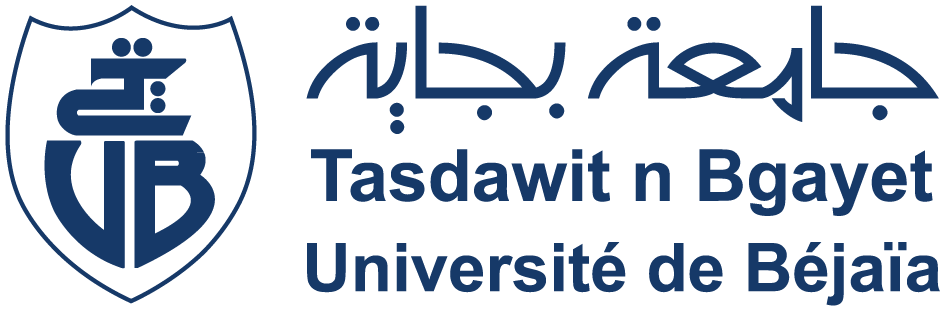
- Coat of arms of the University
- Other name: Abderrahmane Mira University
- Established: October 1983
- Academic staff: 1,600+
- Students: 43,062
- Location: Béjaïa, Béjaïa Province, 06000, Algeria
- Campus: Targa Ouzemmour; Aboudaou; Amizour; Berchiche
- Language: French; Arabic; Tamazight
- Website: www.univ-bejaia.dz

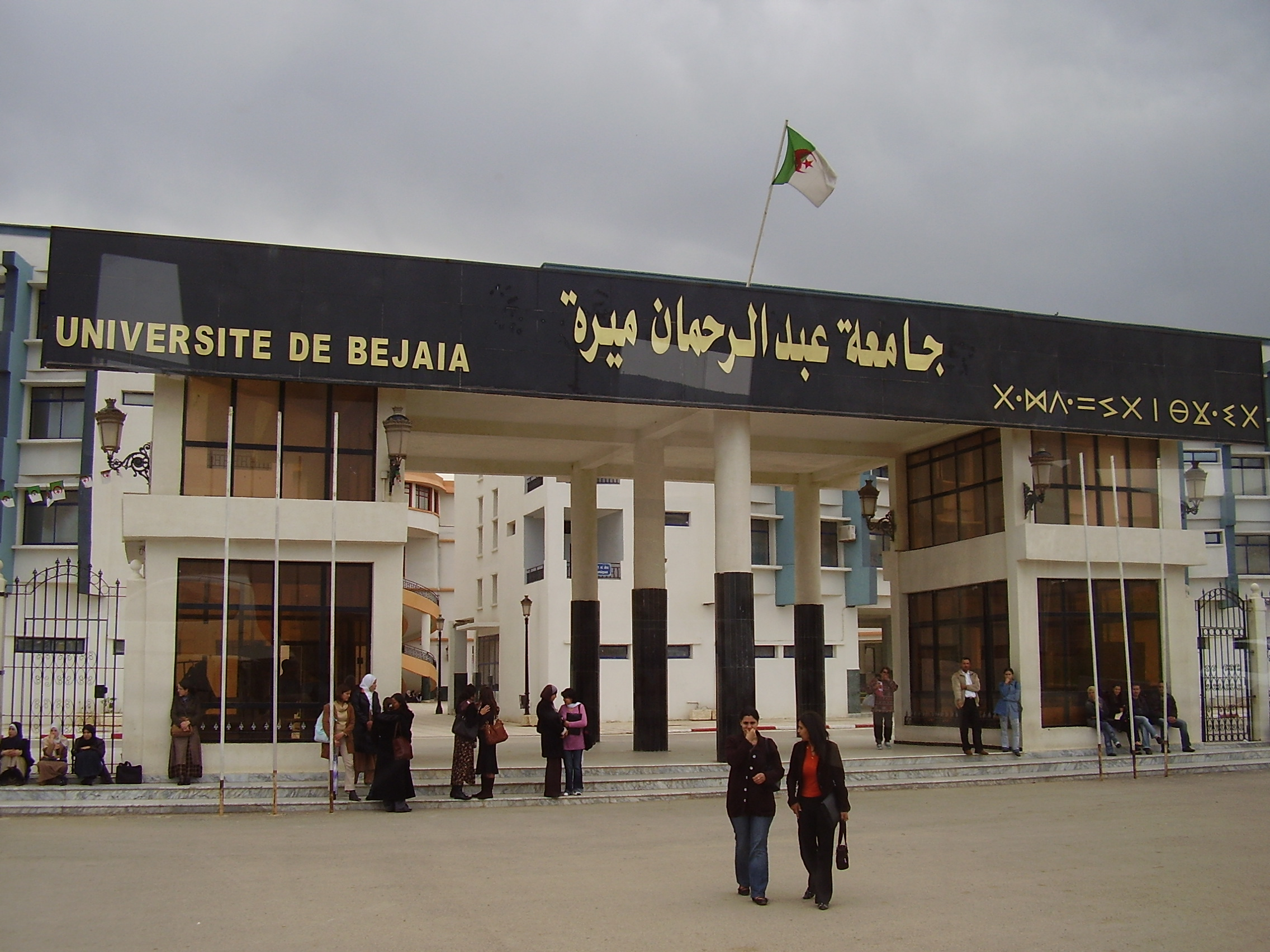
The main entrance of the University of Béjaïa

The University of Béjaïa (French: Université de Béjaïa, Arabic: جامعة بجاية, romanized: Jamieat Bijaya, Kabyle: ⵝⴰⵚⴷⴰⵯⵉⵝ ⵏ ⴱⴴⴰⵢⵝ, romanized: Tasdawit n'Bgayet) or University Abderrahmane Mira of Béjaïa is a university in Béjaïa, Algeria. It is named after Abderrahmane Mira.

Set up in 1983, it became a university in 1998.

== Bibliography ==
- Hachi, Slimane and Aïssani, Djamil (2008). "Béjaïa, centre de transmission du savoir", C.N.R.P.A.H., ISBN 978-9961-716-23-6.
- Kadri, Aïssa (2000). "La construction du système d'enseignement supérieur en Algérie (1850-1995)" Vincent Geisser (dir.), dans Diplômés Algériens d'ici et ailleurs, Paris, CNRS Éditions, coll. "Études de l'Année du Maghreb", 332 p., ISBN 978-2-271-05780-8, p. 33–55.
- Tas, Idir (2022). Petite sœur, Les éditions du Net, ISBN 978-2312119359.
