= Healthcare in Algeria =

Healthcare in Algeria consists of an established network of hospitals, clinics, and dispensaries. The government provides universal health care.

== History ==
Development of life expectancy in Algeria

The first public hospitals were built in Algiers, Oran and Annaba between 1883 and 1889, and in 1895 the first class of native Algerian medical students graduated as medical doctors. However between 1914 and 1964, healthcare stagnated and only 50 hospital beds were added, on average. Only about 19 qualified doctors were added to the workforce on average every year. The Algerian government invested heavily in training new medical staff and medical schools began graduating large numbers of doctors.

At the start of Algeria's independence in 1962, the Algerian health care system was small and consisted of only one physician per 33,000 people. There was estimated to be 300 doctors in all and only one trained paramedic per 40,000 people. The country has made major changes and progress since then in its policies and systems of health care. From 1975 onward, the Algerian government introduced a free national health care system. Hospital treatment, medications, and outpatient care became free to all citizens of Algeria.

== Public healthcare system ==
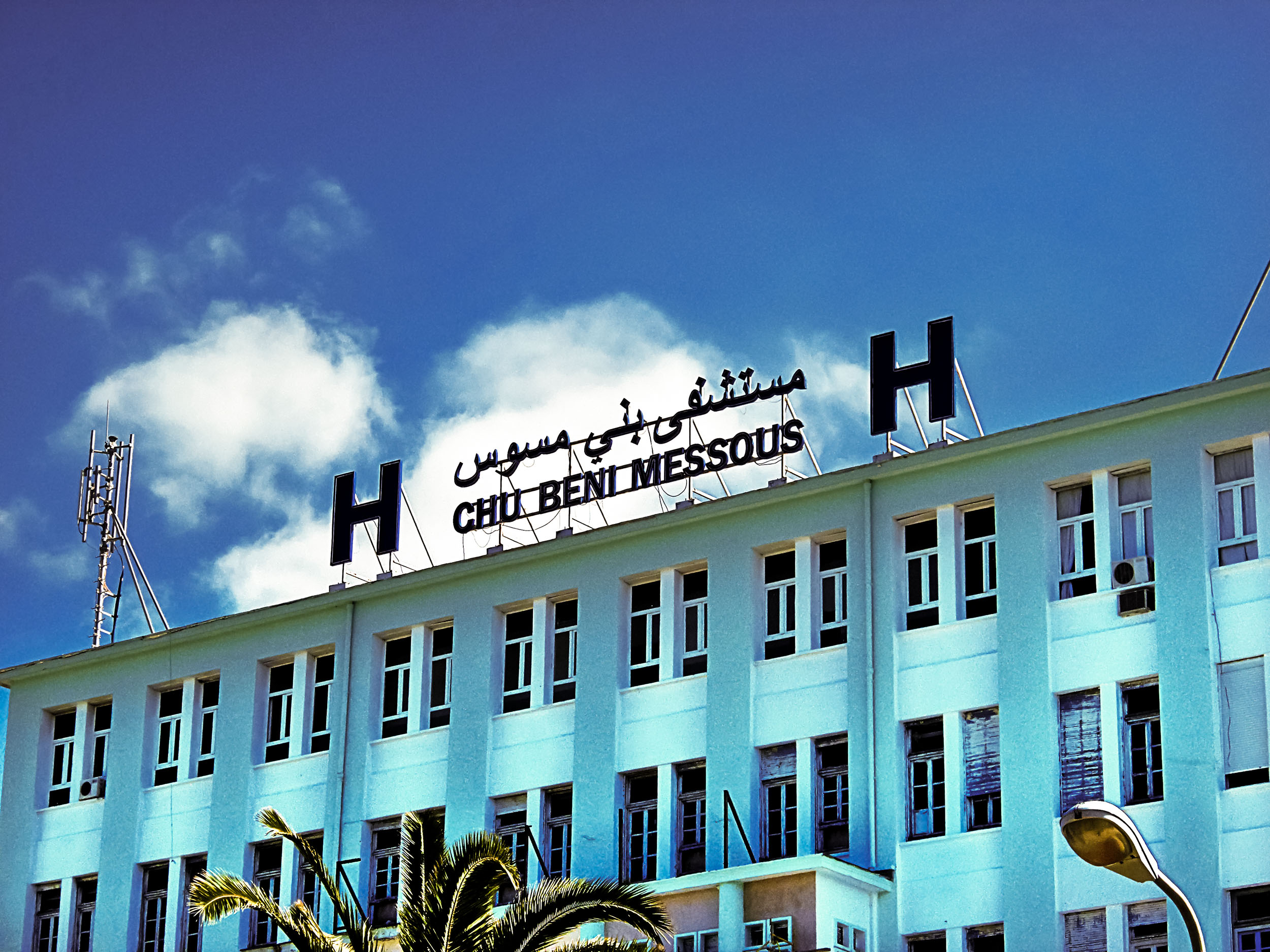
Central Hospital University Beni Messous

The national medical insurance scheme covers 90% of the entire population. Under the public health insurance system, vulnerable populations such as the poor, children, and the elderly, are entitled to free healthcare, while wealthier citizens must partially pay for their healthcare according to a sliding scale. The Algerian government decided to invest in government run expansive health care centres and clinics instead of investing in expensive hospitals. The health care facilities and medical equipment varies in size depending on the size of local population. Remote areas tend to get more rudimentary medical services. The Algerian government had a 4-year plan from 2010–14, which was expected to spend €5.7bn in health care which a majority of the fund directed in the establishment of over 1,500 health care facilities all over Algeria. By 2015, the Algerian government had allocated €4.85bn to build 10 hospital and renovate old ones. The Algerian government is investing in human resources by creating 58,000 jobs in nursing, doctors and health care assistants. The Algerian government is dedicating increased funds into increasing the amount of resources that the health care sector needs to develop their new facilities. This funding will go into new medical equipment and improved hospital capacity capabilities.

Access to healthcare is enhanced by the requirement that doctors and dentists work in public health for at least five years. However, doctors are more easily found in the cities of the north than in the southern Sahara region. While medical equipment and medications in public facilities may not always be up to date, staffing levels are high.

The minister of the Ministry of Health, renamed the Ministry of Health, Population and Hospital Reform in 2000 is part of the Council of Ministers established by the Algerian Constitution of 1996.

The Algerian healthcare system consisted in 2018 of the following, according to Mohamed L’Hadj, Director General of the Ministry of Health, Population and Hospital Reform:

- 16 university hospitals
- 297 public hospitals
- 273 local healthcare institutions
- 1708 polyclinics
- 6226 healthcare centres.
- 575 private institutions, of which 206 were clinics and hospitals, and 369 diagnosis centres.
- Algeria had in total 23,563 private offices, 9,751 specialised and 7,298 general practices, as well as 6,514 dental practices.
- a total of over 242,000 healthcare professionals in the public sector alone.
- Construction for 40 additional public and specialized hospitals and 422 liberal facilities

== Private healthcare system ==
The private health sectors in Algeria is a non government run health care system which citizens must pay for their services. The private health care sector had developed quickly to fill the gaps that the government public health care system had left. Private medical care is very limited as their services are not covered by the public health care system and only a few Algerians can afford to pay out of pocket for their own medical treatments. Patients that seek to use the private health system will pay large amounts of out of pocket fees and enjoy a higher quality of services. A private health insurance system does not yet exist in Algeria. Private medical facilities are becoming more common in Algeria, with 250 private clinics operating in 2015, and many more planned and under construction.

== Response to COVID-19 ==
The first COVID-19 case in Algeria was reported by the Ministry on February 25, 2020. By November 2020, the Algerian healthcare system was struggling to cope with the pandemic.

== See also ==
- Health in Algeria
- Ministry of Health, Population and Hospital Reform
