= Abdelwahab Nouri =

Algerian politician

Minister of Territorial Development, Tourism, and Handicrafts
- In office June 11, 2016 – May 25, 2017
- Preceded by: Amar Ghoul
- Succeeded by: Messaoud Benagoun

Minister of Water Resources and the Environment
- In office May 14, 2015 – June 11, 2016
- Preceded by: Hocine Necib (as water resources); Dalila Boudjemaa (as environment)
- Succeeded by: Abdelkader Ouali

Minister of Agriculture and Rural Development
- In office September 11, 2013 – May 14, 2015
- Preceded by: Rachid Benaissa
- Succeeded by: Abdelkader Kadi

Personal details
- Born: February 15, 1952 (age 74) Arris, Batna Province, French Algeria (now Algeria)
- Party: FLN

Abdelwahab Nouri is an Algerian politician who served as Minister of Territorial Development, Tourism, and Handicrafts from 2016 to 2017, Minister of Water Resources and the Environment from 2015 to 2016, and Minister of Agriculture and Rural Development from 2013 to 2015. Nouri also held several positions as wali of several provinces.

== Biography ==
Nouri was born on February 15, 1952, in Arris, Batna Province, then French Algeria (now Algeria). He holds a degree in private law. Nouri began his career as chief financial inspector of Batna wilaya from 1977 to 1978, serving in several positions within the Batna wilaya government until 1980. Between 1980 and 1989, he held several top positions in Guelma Province and Skikda Province.

Between 1994 and 1997, Nouri served as the governor of Aïn Defla Province. From 1997 to 1999, he served as the governor of Skikda Province. From 1999 to 2004, Nouri served as the governor of Sétif Province. From 2004 to 2013, he served as the governor of Tlemcen Province. In his tenure as governor of Tlemcen, he was called "Mouawazaa el-Arzaq" or "Distributor of wealth." Nouri is a close confidant of then-president Abdelaziz Bouteflika and turned Tlemcen into a city favored by Bouteflika and the Algerian elite, even building a massive palace that was later abandoned after Nouri left the governorship. Despite massive investment in the region (including by Saif al-Islam Gaddafi) incentivized by Nouri, Tlemcen residents had issues with electricity, water, and employment.

In 2013, Nouri was appointed Minister of Agriculture and Rural Development. Nouri attempted to increase Algeria's food independence and agricultural productivity. In September 2014, he inaugurated a National Agricultural Equipment and Products fair in Aïn Defla. In 2015, he was appointed Minister of Water Resources and the Environment, where he attended COP 21 in 2015. Under his tenure, Algeria and Iran founded four water joint venture firms. Nouri was the first minister of water resources and the environment; the ministry was merged and he served as the replacement of Hocine Necib and Dalila Boudjemaa.

From 2016 to 2017, Nouri served as the Minister of Territorial Development, Tourism, and Handicrafts. Under his tenure, the first direct flight between Algeria and Hungary took place. He also continued the increase in tourism jobs supported by the Algerian government. Despite an increased focus on tourist zones, Nouri's administration embezzled funds given by the World Bank Group in collusion with Cherif Rahmani. In 2017, Nouri was replaced by Messaoud Benagoun, who himself was sacked two days later for having a fraudulent degree.
