= Abdelkader Ouali =

ETF price PS4

Minister of Water Resources and the Environment
- In office June 11, 2016 – April 6, 2017
- Preceded by: Abdelwahab Nouri
- Succeeded by: Noureddine Boutarfa (interim); Hocine Neceb (Water Resources); Fatma Zohra Zerouati (Environment)

Minister of Public Works
- In office May 14, 2015 – June 11, 2016
- Preceded by: Abdelkader Kadi
- Succeeded by: Boudjemaa Talai

16th wali of Algiers Province
- In office 1994–1996
- Preceded by: Ahmed Horri
- Succeeded by: Lahbib Habchi

Personal details
- Born: April 3, 1952 (age 74) Mostaganem, Mostaganem Province, French Algeria (now Algeria)
- Party: FLN
- Occupation: Wali

Abdelkader Ouali is an Algerian politician who served as the wali of several Algerian provinces and as Minister of Water Resources and the Environment between 2016 and 2017 and Minister of Public Works between 2015 and 2016. He was sentenced to three years in prison in 2022 for building roads for businessman Ali Haddad.

== Biography ==
Ouali was born on April 3, 1952, in Mostaganem, Mostaganem Province, Algeria. Between 1991 and 1994, Ouali served as the wali of Tlemcen Province, after having served in several managerial positions and head of the dairas of El Hassasna and Koléa District. He then served as wali of Algiers Province between 1994 and 1995, Sétif Province between 1995 and 1999, Tizi Ouzou Province between 1999 and 2001, and Batna Province between 2001 and 2005.

Ouali served as the Minister of Public Works of Algeria between May 14, 2015, and June 11, 2016. From 2016 to 2017, he served a Minister of Water Resources and the Environment before running for the People's National Assembly in Mostaganem and winning. Ouali's name appeared in a corruption case involving jailed Prime Minister Abdelmalek Sellal and prominent businessman Ali Haddad in October 2020, and Ouali was arrested and placed in pre-trial detention in November 2020. Ouali denied responsibility. He was sentenced to three years in prison for corruption in March 2022.
