= Hadj Miliani =

Algerian scholar

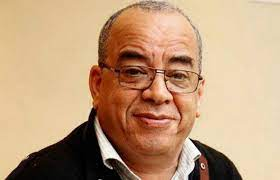
- Hadj Miliani, researcher and professor of literature
- Born: 21 March 1951; Oran, Algeria
- Died: 2 July 2021 (aged 70); Oran, Algeria
- Citizenship: Algerian
- Education: University of Mostaganem; Centre de Recherche en Anthropologie Sociale et Culturelle (CRASC)
- Alma mater: University of Mostaganem
- Occupations: Professor of literature, researcher
- Known for: Studies on Raï, hip-hop, and Algerian cultural identity
- Awards: Posthumous tribute for his contribution to research and culture in Algeria

Hadj Miliani (21 March 1951 – 2 July 2021) was an Algerian scholar and academic. A specialist in the study and preservation of Algerian cultural heritage, particularly Raï music and Rap.

== Biography ==
Hadj Miliani was born on 21 March 1951 in Oran, Algeria. As a researcher and academic, he devoted his life to the study and preservation of Algerian cultural heritage, particularly Raï and hip-hop music.

Miliani died on 2 July 2021 in Oran.

== Cultural involvement ==
Hadj Miliani played a major role in the international recognition of Raï music, contributing to its inclusion on UNESCO’s Representative List of the Intangible Cultural Heritage of Humanity. He also conducted extensive research on Raï and theatre, particularly during Algeria’s “Black Decade”, a period during which he held lectures on Raï music, its origins, and Oranese song traditions.

Miliani was actively involved in organizing cultural events in Algeria. He co-organized the country's first Manga Festival, held in Bab Ezzouar in 2008.

== Contributions to musicology ==
=== Studies on Raï ===
Hadj Miliani was a founding member of Gerchamm (Groupe d'Études et de Recherche sur la Chanson et les Musiques Maghrébines) and served on the jury of the first Raï Festival of Oran. He co-authored the book L'Aventure du raï: musique et société with Bouziane Daoudi — an in-depth study on the evolution of this musical genre.

=== Studies on Rap ===
Hadj Miliani was among the first to analyze the phenomenon of rap in Algeria. He published the article Culture planétaire et identités frontalières: À propos du rap en Algérie in Cahiers d’Études Africaines, examining rap as an expressive form of youth identity in Algerian suburbs.

== Selected publications ==
- (1998) La propagande comme institution: discours et institutionnalisation de la propagande cinématographique dans l’Algérie coloniale (1943–1960).
- (1999) L’humour dans les langues maternelles en Algérie.
- (1999) Transactions sociales et sémiotique du sujet: le cas du mariage “Falso” dans l’Ouest algérien.
- (2000) Fabrication patrimoniale et imaginaires identitaires: autour des chants et musiques en Algérie.
- (2002) De la nostalgie du local aux mythologies de l’exil: chanteurs et chansons dans l’émigration algérienne en France (1920s–1980s).
- (2006) Innovations langagières et héritage linguistique chez les jeunes en Algérie: Une approche socio-anthropologique.
- (2013) La presse écrite en Algérie: positionnements médiatiques et enjeux linguistiques.
- (2015) Éléments pour une étude des entrepreneurs culturels et des expériences théâtrales en régime colonial en Algérie: 1950–1962.
- (2018) Déplorations, polémiques et stratégies patrimoniales: à propos des musiques citadines en Algérie en régime colonial.
- (2023) Éléments d’histoire sociale de la chanson populaire en Algérie: Textes et contextes.

== See also ==
- Music of Algeria
- Raï
- Algerian hip-hop
