= Higher School of Sports Sciences and Technologies, Algiers =

Higher education institution in Algeria

Coordinates: 36.7665°N 3.0006°E

Higher School of Sports Sciences and Technologies
- École Supérieure en Sciences et Technologies du Sport (ESSTS) المدرسة العليا لعلوم الرياضة وتكنولوجياتها
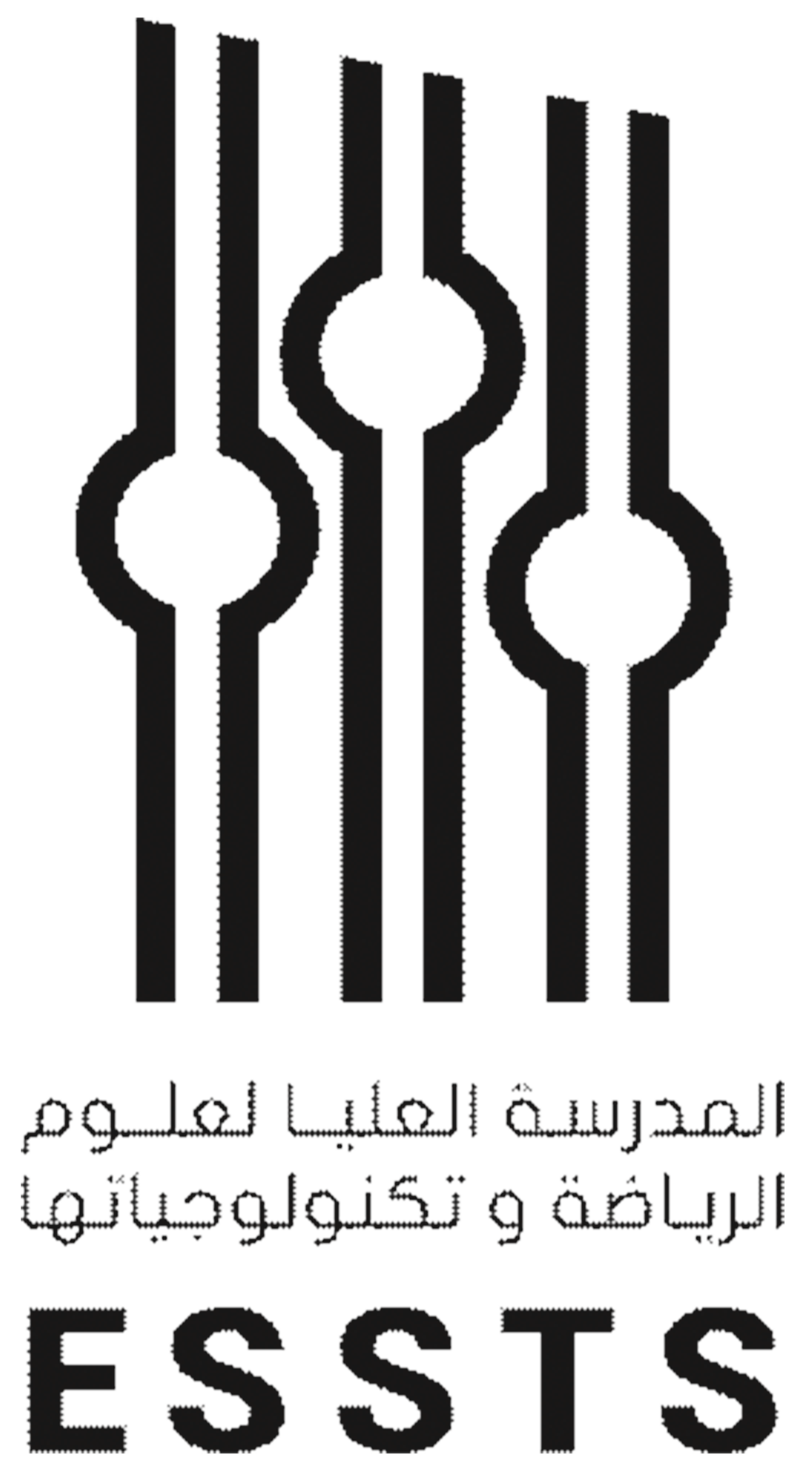
- ESSTS Logo
- Type: Public Higher education institution
- Established: 1975
- Affiliations: Ministry of Youth and Sports / Ministry of Higher Education and Scientific Research
- Director: Interim. Mohamed Amine Bouras
- Location: Dely Ibrahim, Algiers, Algeria
- Language: Arabic, French
- Website: essts.dz

The Higher School of Sports Sciences and Technologies (ESSTS) (French: École Supérieure en Sciences et Technologies du Sport, Arabic: المدرسة العليا لعلوم الرياضة وتكنولوجياتها) is a public higher education institution located in Dely Ibrahim, Algiers, Algeria. Placed under the dual administrative and academic supervision of the Ministry of Youth and Sports and the Ministry of Higher Education and Scientific Research, ESSTS is the national center for training executive personnel, elite coaches, sports managers, and physical education specialists.

== History ==
The establishment was initially founded in 1975 under the name of the National Sports Center (French: Centre National des Sports or CNS). In 1990, the institution underwent restructuring and became the National Institute of Higher Training in Sports Sciences and Technology (INFS/STS). In November 2011, through Executive Decree No. 11-392, it was officially transformed into a higher school (école hors université) under its current designation, ESSTS, aiming to elevate the academic and scientific standards of sports sciences in Algeria.

Throughout its operational history, ESSTS has also served as a regional pedagogical hub, hosting international students and foreign sports cadres through bilateral government exchange initiatives.

== Administration and leadership ==
The institution has been led by severalacademic figures and athletic specialists throughout its structural transitions:

- Taha Houssine Zerguini (2010–2011) – Appointed by the Ministry of Youth and Sports in January 2010, following his tenure as Rector of the University of Science and Technology – Houari Boumediene (USTHB), serving until September 2011.
- Mourad Mahour Bacha – Former Director of ISTS/ESSTS, a former national champion decathlete and prominent professor in physical education and sports sciences.
- Fethi Belghoul (c. 2021–2023) – Served as Director during the school's scientific and structural developments in the early 2020s.
- Rachid Benziane (2023–2024) – Former Director of ESSTS, appointed General Director in May 2024.
- Salim Bezziou (2024–2025) – Former Director of ESSTS
- Mohamed Amine Bouras (2026 – Present) – The Secretary General ESSTS appointed as the Interim Director of the ESSTS.

=== Other administrative figures ===
- Abderrezak Benmansour – Professor in Biochemistry, got his diploma in Russia. Appointed by the Ministry of Youth and Sports as Deputy Director of Studies (Directeur adjoint des études), who has also served as Interim Director (Directeur par intérim).

== Organization and missions ==
The ESSTS is tasked with several core missions regarding national sports development:

- Providing specialized academic training for the sports associative movement and elite physical educators.
- Offering pedagogical and scientific support for elite and high-level athletes.
- Training administrative and organizational personnel for the management of sporting activities.
- Publishing academic studies and organizing scientific conferences, seminars, and international colloquiums in the field of sports sciences.

== Academic programs ==
In addition to undergraduate and graduate curricula for baccalaureate holders, ESSTS administers specialized continuous training cycles (Formation continue), including:

- Degree System LMD (Licence, Master, Doctorate) certification.
- Professional certifications for Fitness Trainers (Certificat de préparateur physique / شهادة مدرب اللياقة البدنية).
- Specialized training programs for Sports Performance Analysts (Analyste de la performance sportive / محلل الأداء الرياضي).
- Degree equivalency certification pathways for part-time/full-time physical educators.

The school utilizes a digital distance learning platform (Plateforme d'enseignement à distance) to support coursework and academic administration.

== Research and publications ==
The institution is a major hub for sports research in Algeria and operates several specialized research laboratories:

- Laboratory of Social Sciences Applied to Sport
- Laboratory of Biological Sciences Applied to Sport (LaBSas)
- Laboratory of Sports Training Technology

The school regularly hosts scientific seminars—such as conferences focusing on artificial intelligence in biological sciences applied to sports—and formally publishes the Specialized Scientific Journal in Sports Sciences (Revue Scientifique Spécialisée en Sciences du Sport — R4S), a peer-reviewed academic journal hosted on the Algerian Scientific Journals Platform (ASJP).

== Partnerships and cooperation ==
ESSTS actively participates in academic research, sports lexicography, institutional cooperation, and international sports diplomacy:

- Institutional University Partnerships: ESSTS maintains academic and scientific cooperation frameworks with various national institutions, including partnership agreements with the University of Mostaganem.
- Arabic Sports Terminology Project (2024): In October 2024, ESSTS signed a bilateral cooperation agreement with the High Council of the Arabic Language (HCLA), headed by Salah Belaïd and ESSTS Director Rachid Benziane, to compile the first comprehensive specialized glossary of sports terminology in Algeria and the Arab world.
- Sub-Saharan Academic Exchanges: Under executive agreements between Algeria and African partner nations, ESSTS hosts cohorts of foreign sports science students and post-graduates for specialized coaching training.
- Bilateral Algerian-Mauritanian Agreement (2026): During the 20th session of the Algerian-Mauritanian Joint High Commission in Algiers, ESSTS concluded a formal partnership agreement with the High Institute of Youth and Sports (ISJS) of Nouakchott to promote academic mobility, joint scientific research, and athletic coaching exchange.

== See also ==
- List of universities in Algeria
- Sport in Algeria
