= Cheffia =

Coordinates: 36°36′40″N 8°02′20″E

El Cheffia الشافية El Cheffia
- Commune and town
- Interactive map of El Cheffia
- Country: Algeria
- Province: El Taref Province

Population (2008)
  - Total: 8,195
- Time zone: UTC+1 (CET)
- Postal code: 36032

Cheffia is a town and commune in El Taref Province, Algeria. According to the 1998 census it has a population of 7,450.

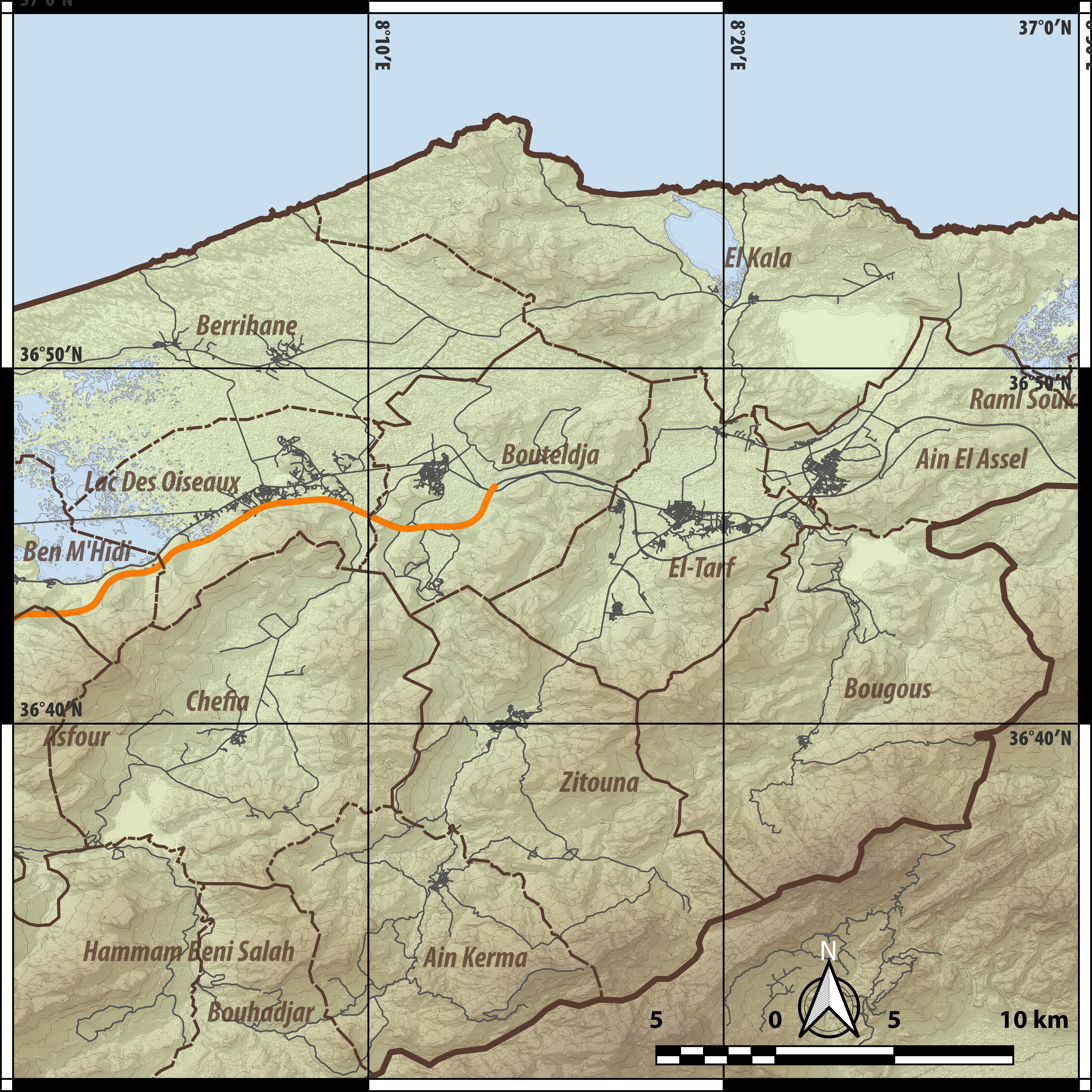
Topographic map of the region around Cheffia

The Cheffia valley was described in 1868 by Reboud as being comprised between the eastern slope of the Bou Habet and a series of grassy knolls where a few gardens and clumps of azeroliers stand here and there. It is a valley which measures from north to south about fifteen kilometres and five kilometres wide. It is divided into two basins by the cultivated plateau of Sidi-Bou-Aoun, which has large stones.

== History ==
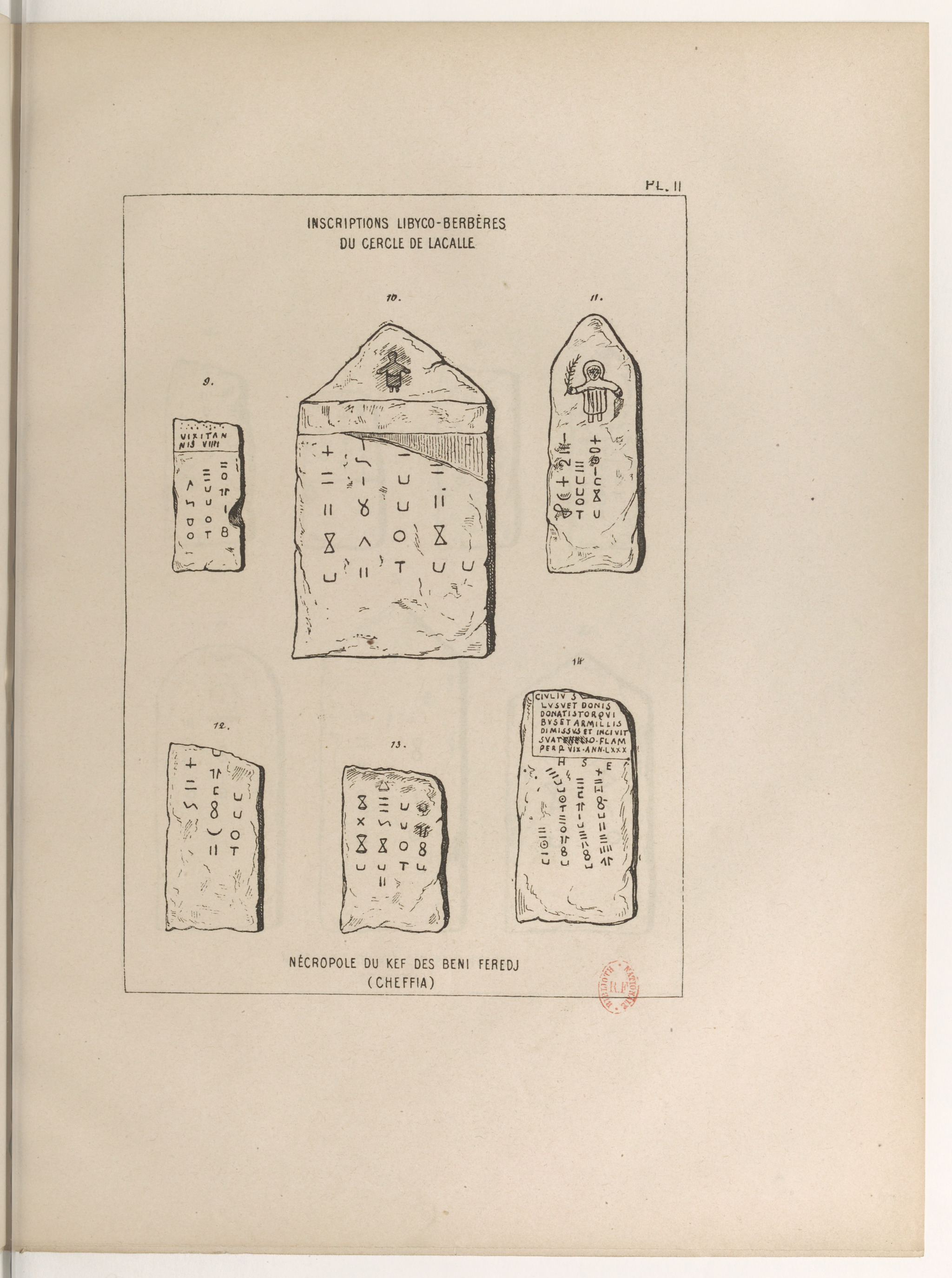
Libyco-Berber inscriptions from Cheffia

Cheffia is the site of the Roman city of Thullium in the Province of Numidia. The Cheffia valley contains a number of ruins that can be considered as Libyan necropolises. Reboud describes a number thereof, and their Lybic (Libyco-Berber) inscriptions, and published the map shown in this article. The region was slow to christianize, with Thullium not receiving its first bishop until the end of the fifth century; a bishop from there was present at the Council of Carthage in 525.

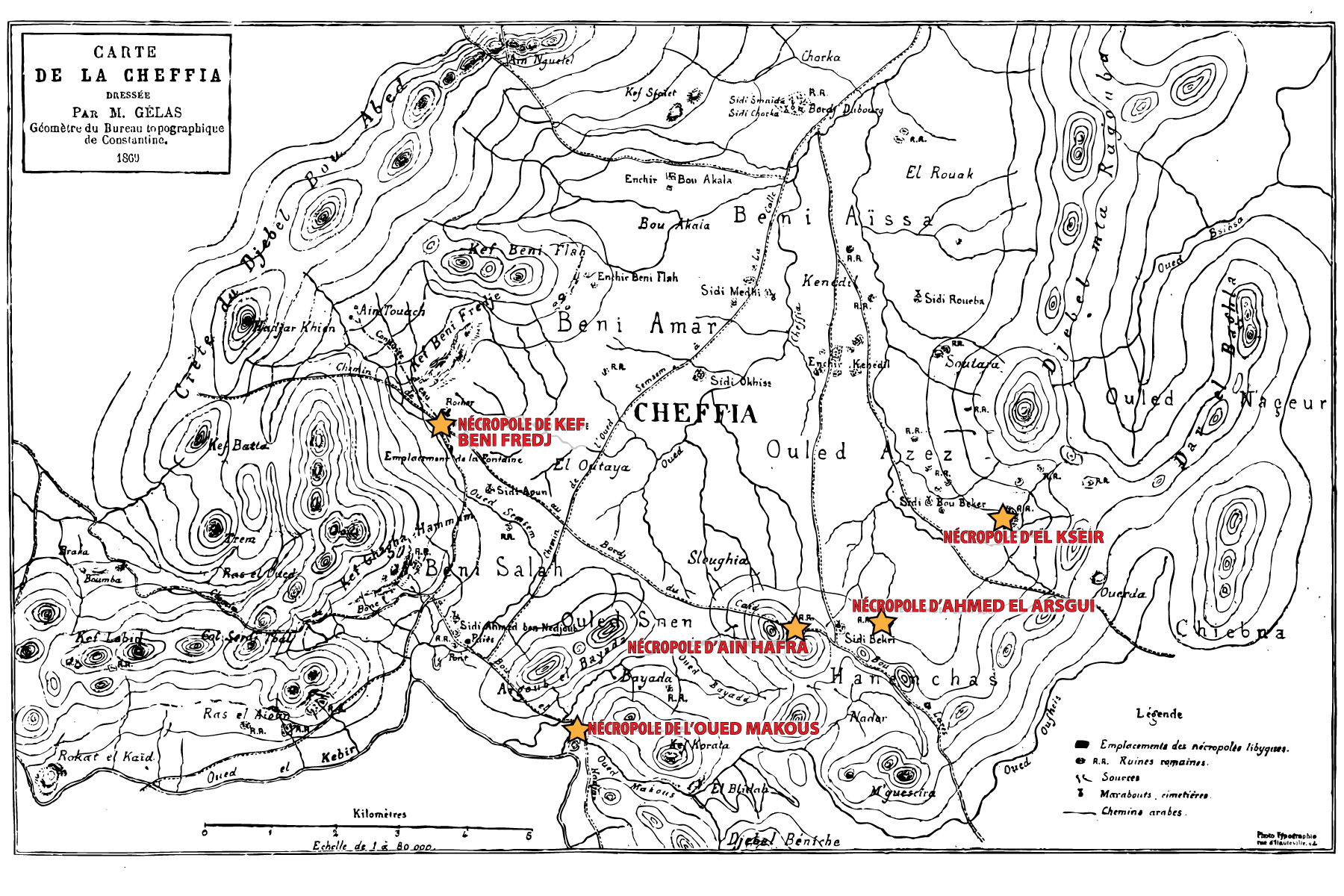
Map showing sites where necropolises have been discovered around Cheffia

== Notable people ==
- Boudjemaa Talai (1952–2022), politician
