= Sheikh Hamada =

Algerian singer

Sheikh Hamada (born 1889, Blad Touahria near Mostaganem; died April 9, 1968) was an Algerian singer. He was one of the founders of the gasba music.

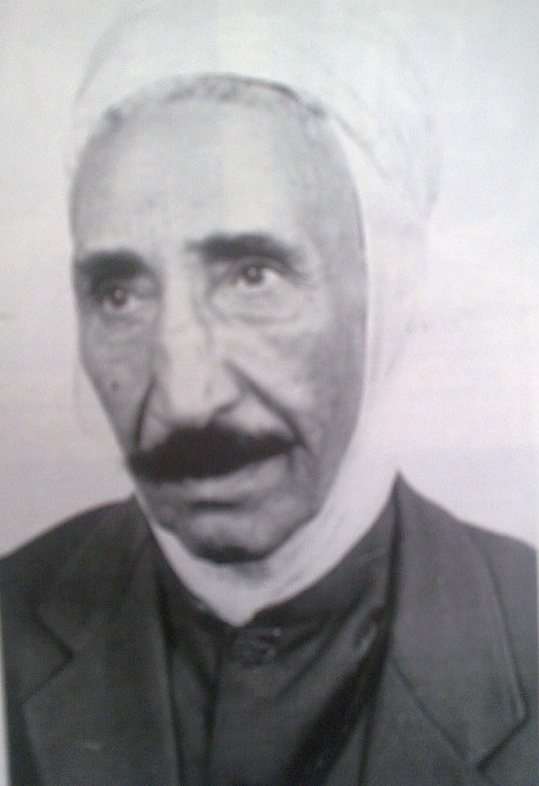
Cheikh Hamada (1889 1968). Master of Oran Bedouin song.

== Accomplishments ==
During his lifetime, he revolutionized Bedouin musical traditions in North Africa and in modern music today. He was the first singer to create bedoui gharbi compositions. He utilized urban poetry in his Hadri, Haouz, and Aroub compositions.

He made his first recording in 1920, and continued to record in Algeria, Paris, and Berlin, until his death.

He revised gasba music, which influenced the area of Dahra, and thus was a large influence on the chaâbi music repertoire, which is one of the most popular musical genres in North Africa today. It is still used in traditional celebrations, with music resulting from the Arabo-Andalusian culture.

This music type is modal and not tonal. Béla Bartók was extremely touched by the artist on a two-year trip to Algeria (1913–1915), which inspired several pieces.

Hamada was the father of two sons killed during the colonial war of The Algerian National Liberation Front from 1954 to 1962.

== Teacher and mentor ==
He was also a mentor to his friend Hadj El Anka, an Algerian artist. They met at outings with philosophical poets and musicians, where they worked together on qaçayds (poems). Hamada was also a teacher for the younger generation: he welcomed into his house several artists like Maâzouz Bouadjadj, teaching, sometimes for hours, a tone, a stanza, the hidden meaning of a word, a verse, a qasida.
