= Mostaganem tramway =

Tram network serving Mostaganem, Algeria

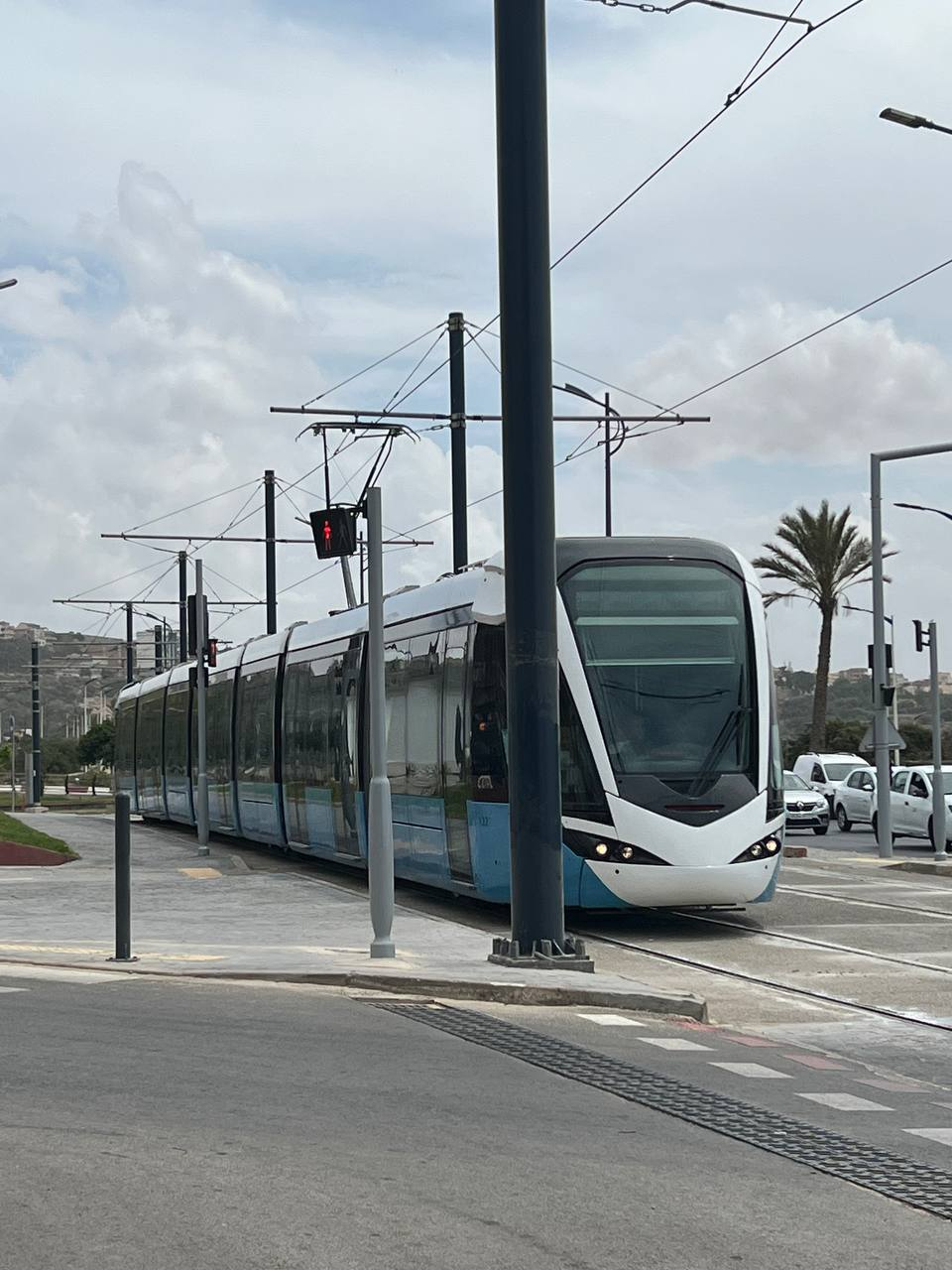

Overview
- Area served: Mostaganem
- Transit type: Tram
- Number of lines: 2
- Number of stations: 23

Operation
- Began operation: 18 February 2023
- Number of vehicles: 25 Citadis 402

Technical
- System length: 14 kilometres (8.7 mi)
- Track gauge: 1,435 mm (4 ft 8 1/2 in) standard gauge
- Electrification: Overhead line (750 V DC)
Network
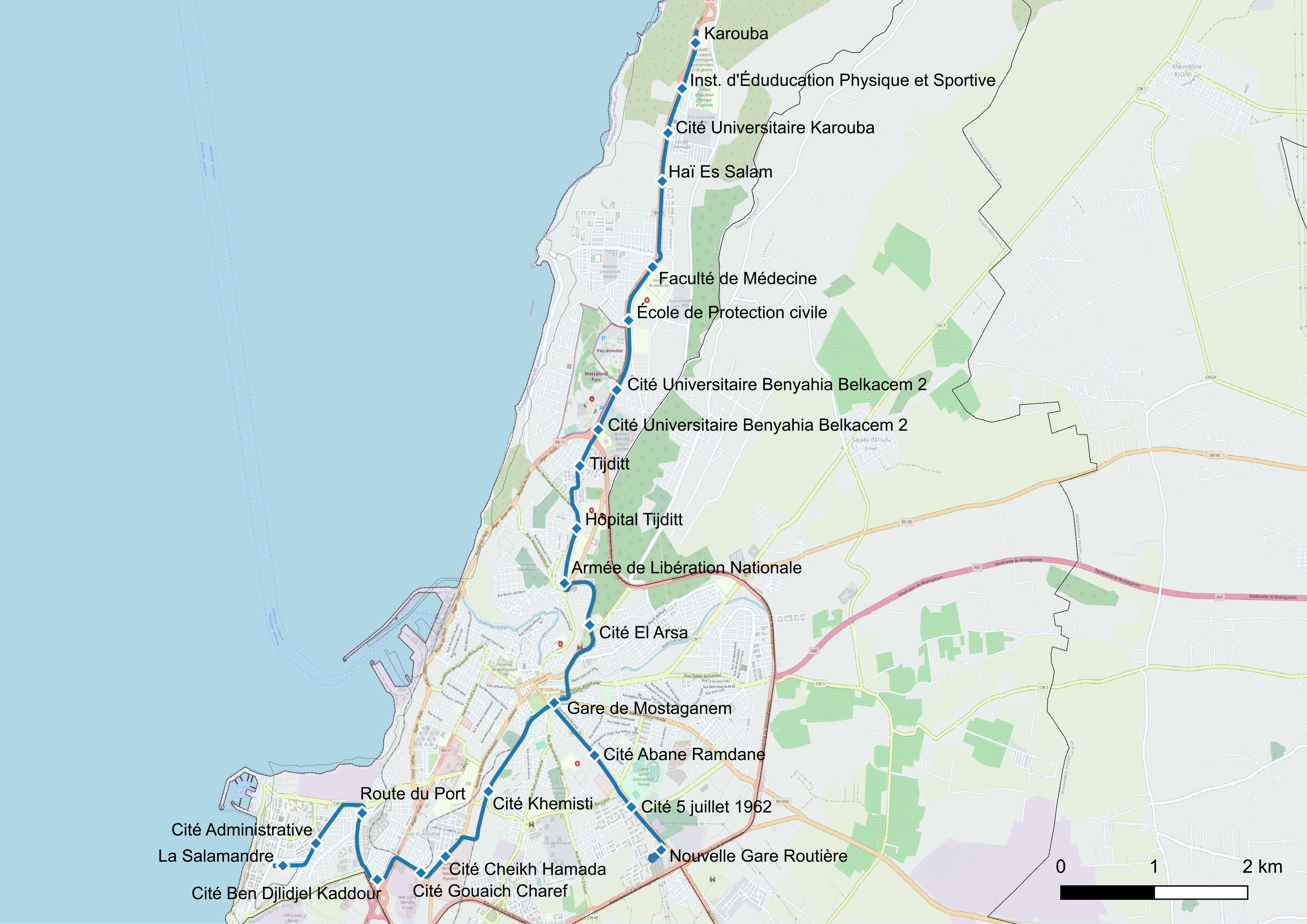

The Mostaganem tramway (French: Tramway de Mostaganem; Arabic: ترامواي مستغانم) is a tramway network serving Mostaganem, Algeria. Opened in 2023, the 14 km (8.7 mi) long network consists of two lines, and is operated by the Société d'exploitation des tramways (SETRAM) and owned by the Entreprise Métro d'Alger (EMA).

== History ==
In 2012, the project was awarded to a consortium of Corsán-Coviam Construcción and Isolux Ingeniería as well as Alstom (28%). Construction work began in September 2013 and was planned to finish in 2016. However, because of financial issues regarding Corsán-Coviam Construcción, the project had to be reawarded to Cosider Travaux Publics, Cosider Ouvrages d'Art and Alstom. Test running on the network started in 2021. Both lines of the network officially opened for service on February 18, 2023.

== System ==
The central hub of the network is formed by the Gare de Mostaganem stop at the railway station of the city. Here terminates line T2, which connects to a bus station in the southwest (terminus Nouvelle Gare Routière). The other line, line T1, is a north-south line running from university to the southwest.

Line		Length	Stops	Interval
T1	La Salamandre ↔ Gare de Mostaganem ↔ Karouba	12,2 km	20	8–10 min
T2	Gare de Mostaganem ↔ Nouvelle Gare Routière	2 km	4	8–10 min

== Rolling stock ==
The network operates 25 seven car low-floor trams of the Alstom Citadis 402 series. They were built in Annaba by the Cital joint venture. The trams are 43 metres long and can carry around 400 passengers.
