= Mostaganem =

City in Algeria

Mostaganem مستغانم
- City
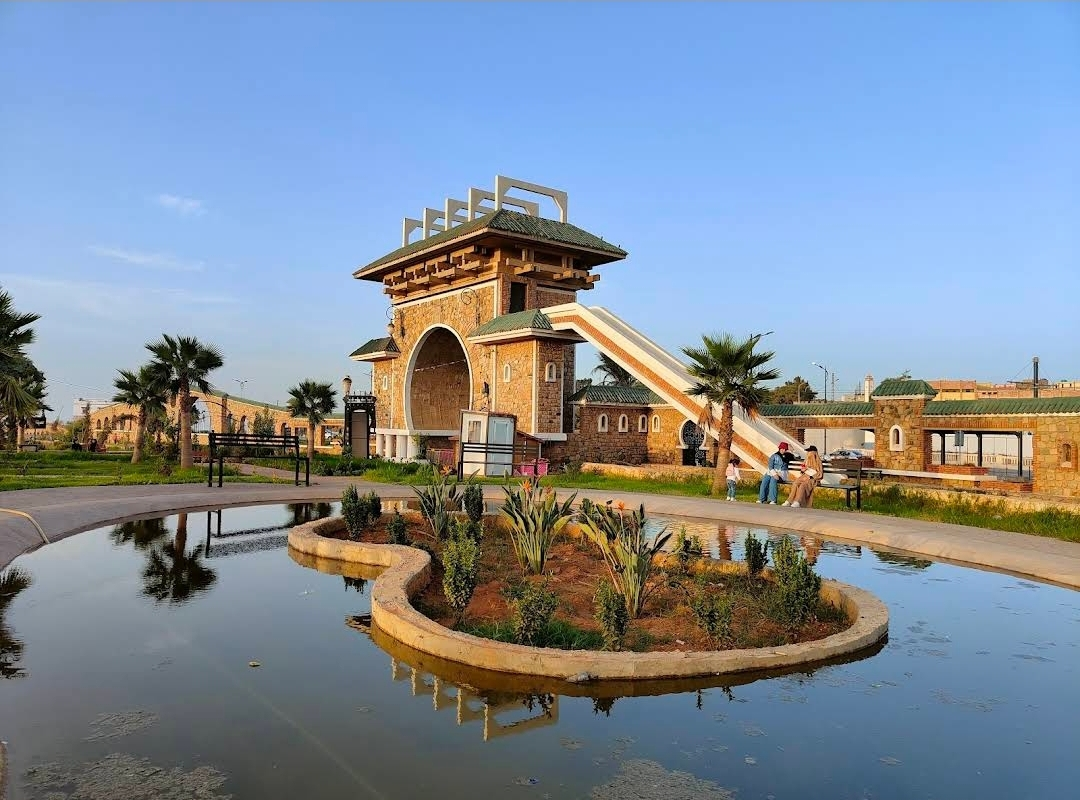
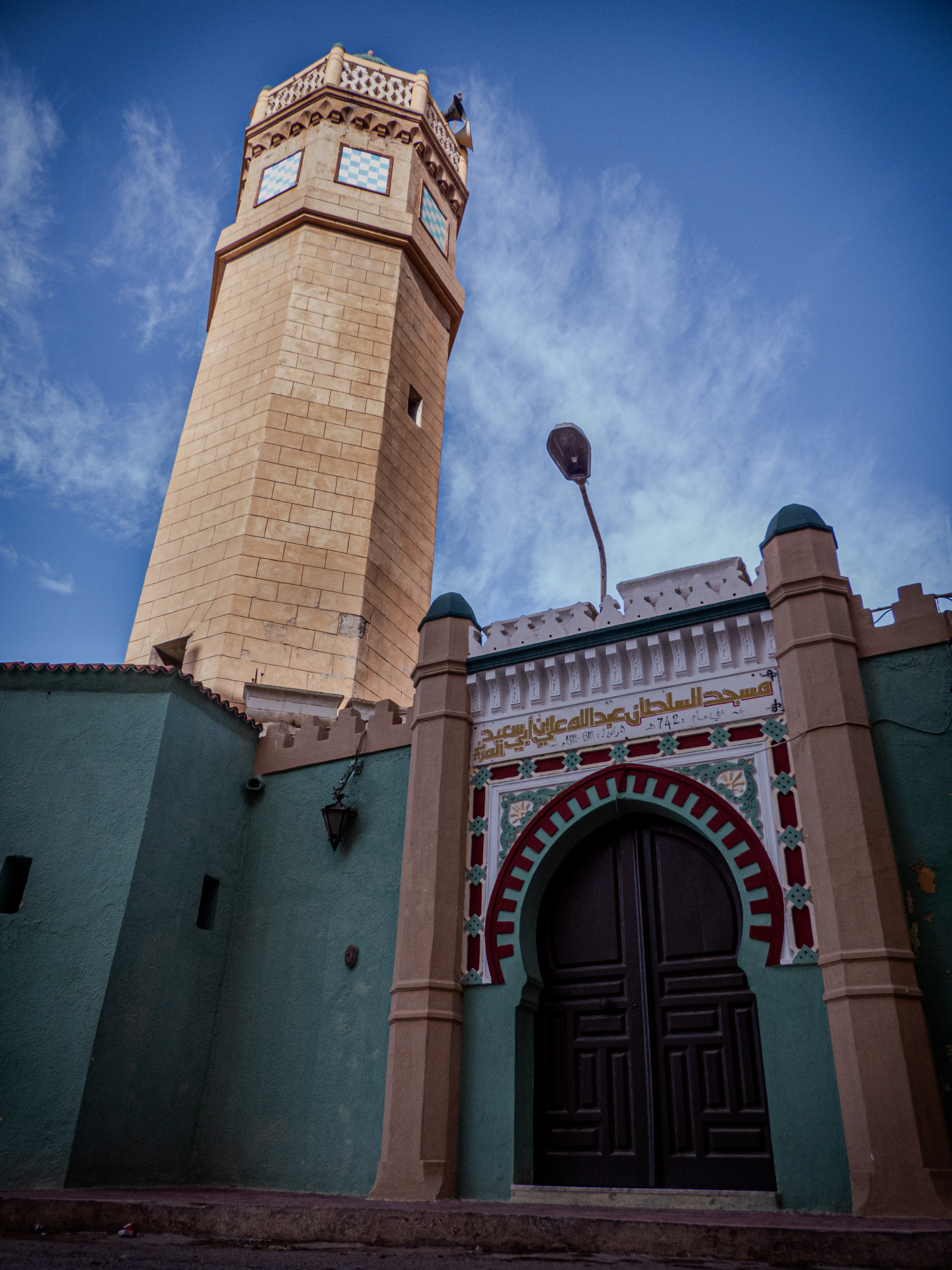
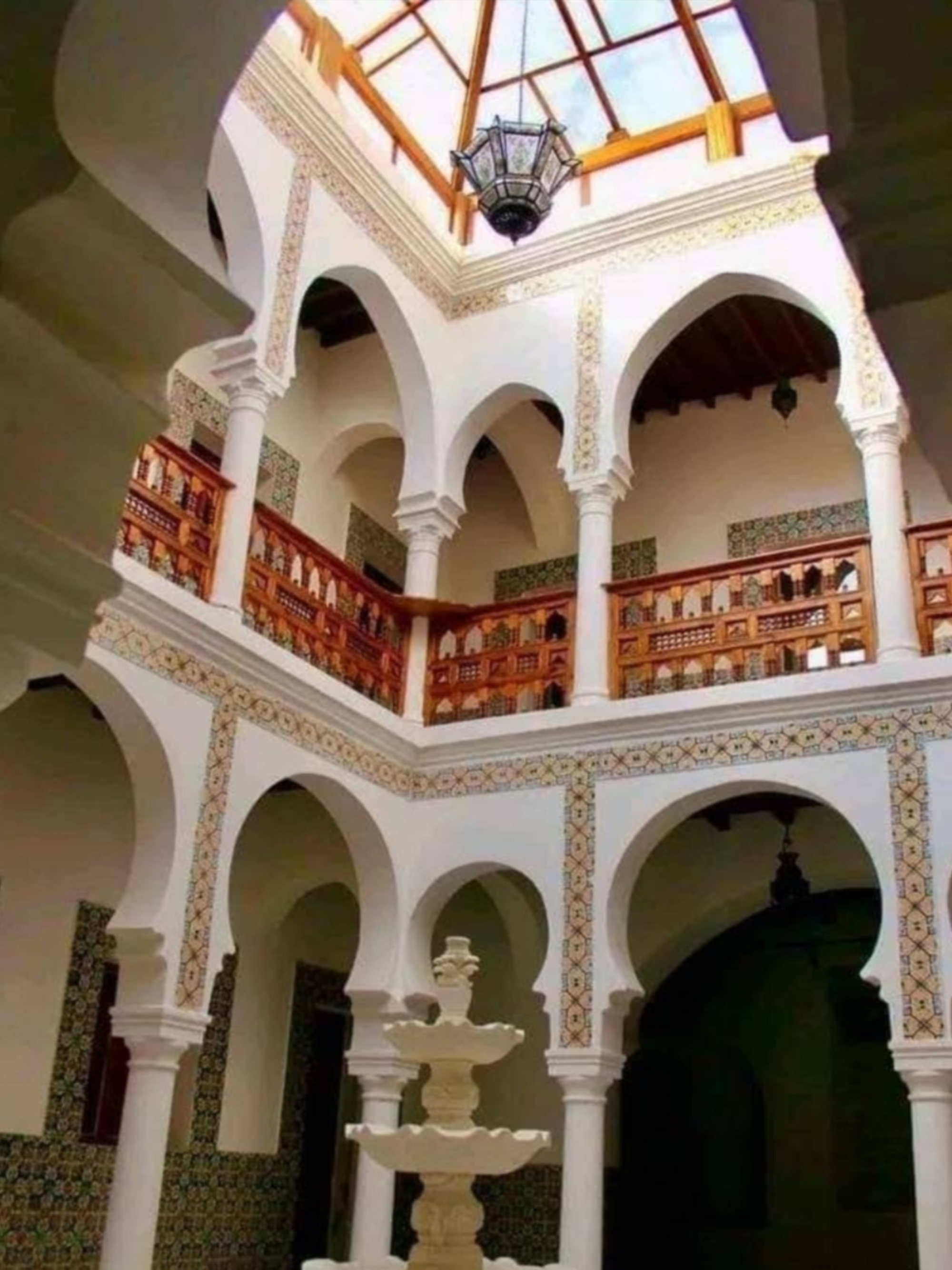
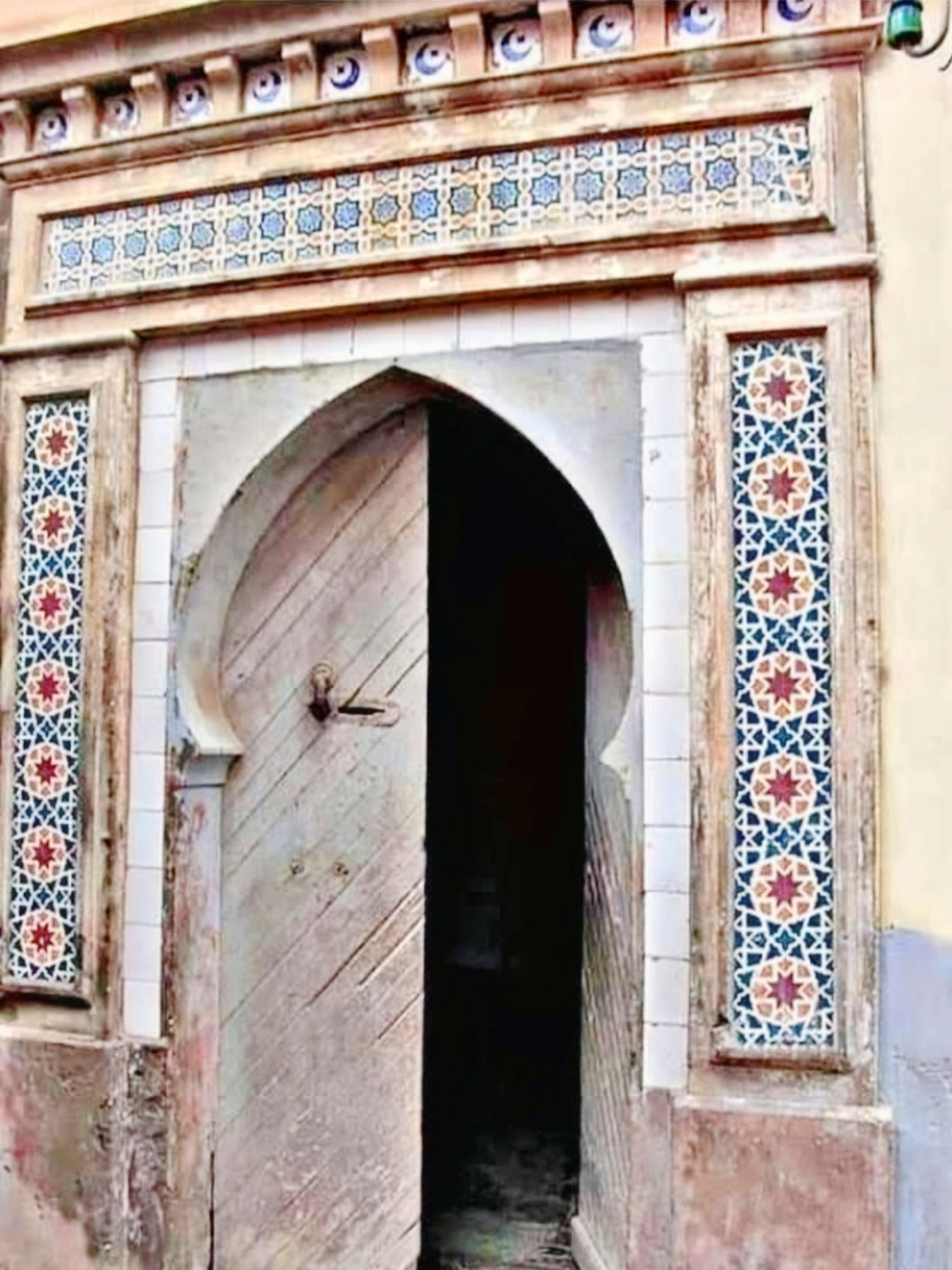
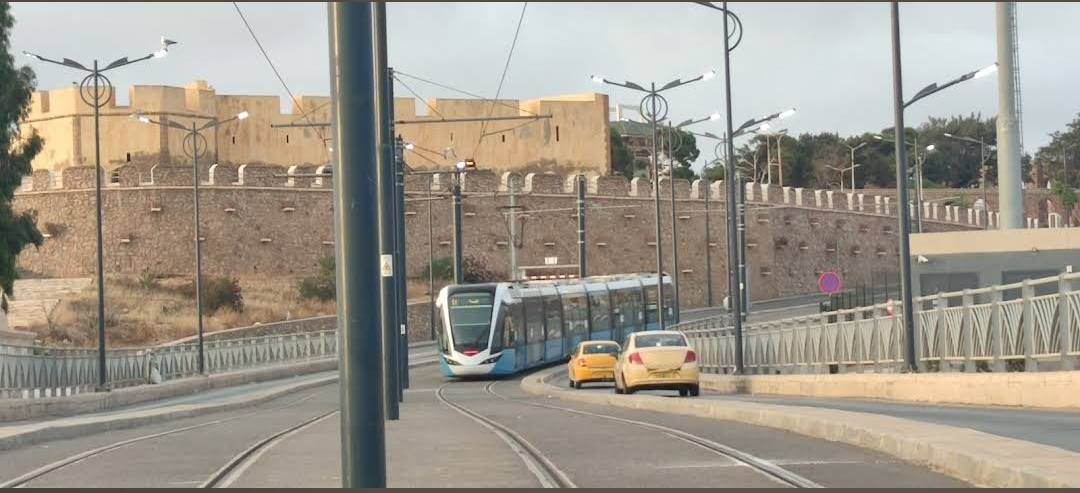
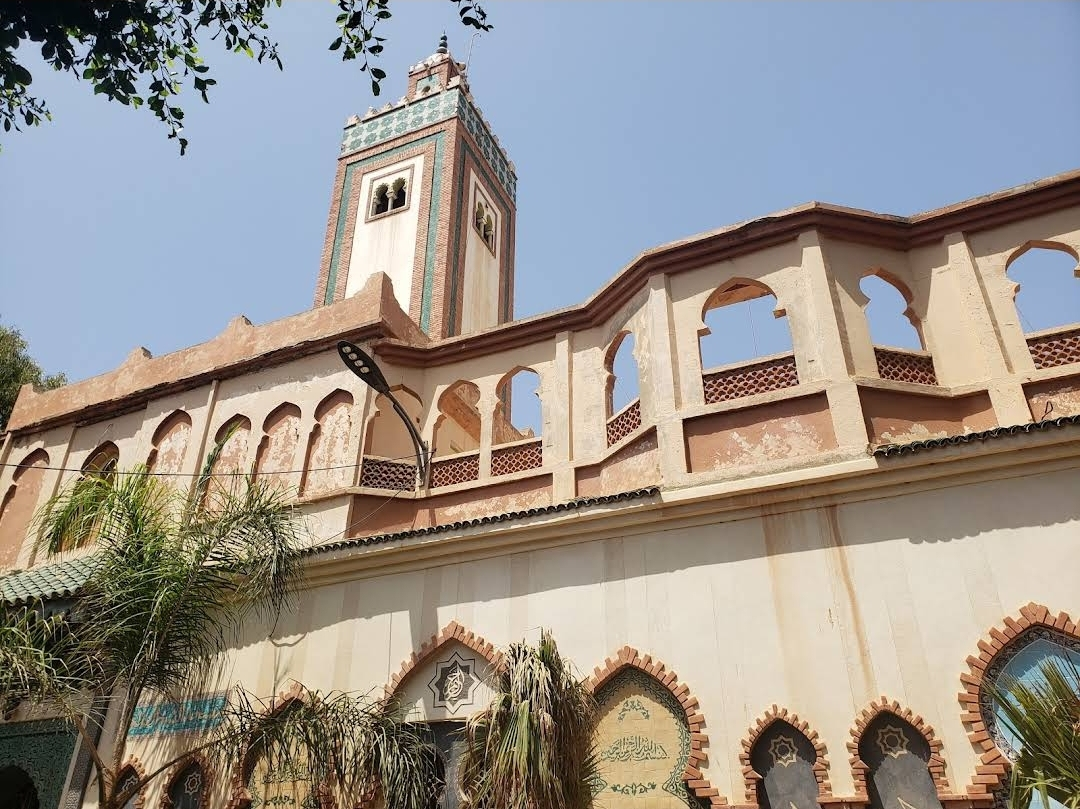
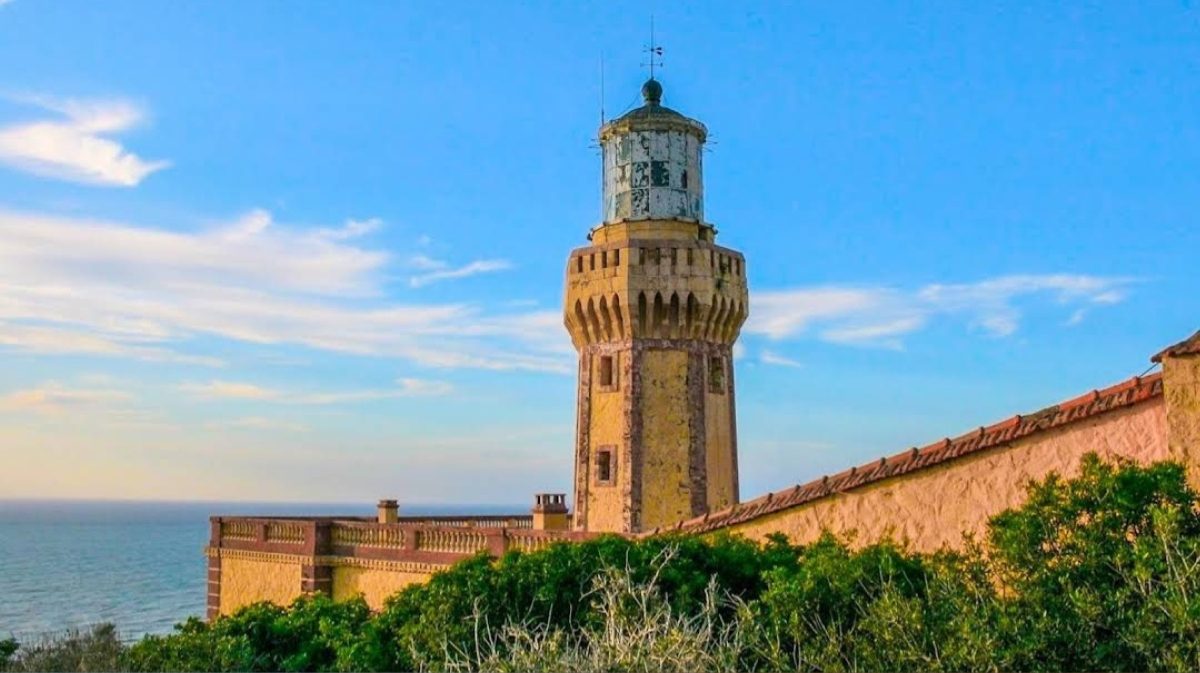
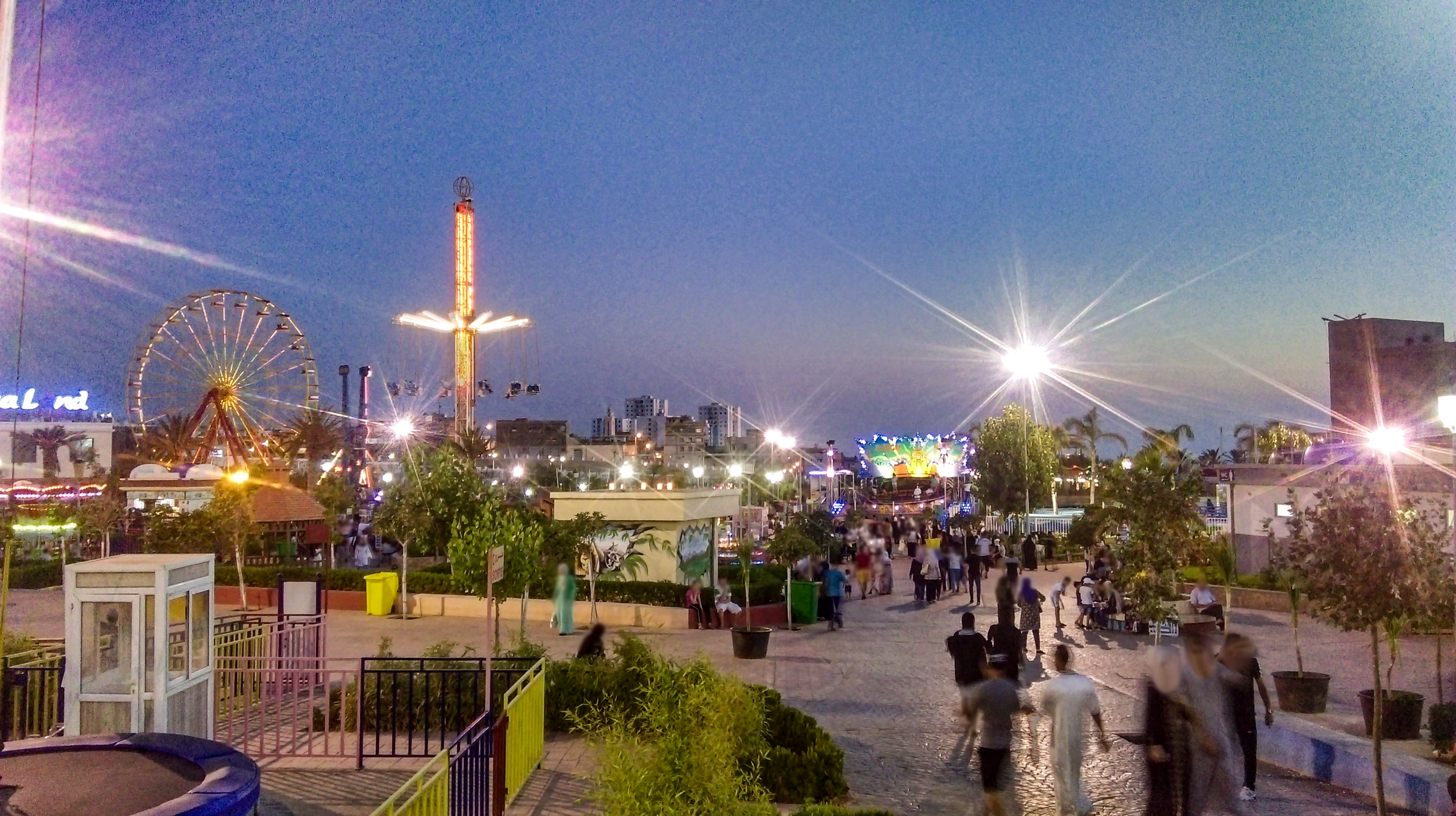
- El Arsa Park Tobana Mosque Dar El Kaïd Dar Hamid El Abdi Bordj Ettork and Mostaganem Tramway Zawiya Al-Alawiyya of Mostaganem Cap Ivi lighthouse Mostaland

- Seal
- Nickname: Pearl of the Mediterranean

- Location within Algeria
- Coordinates: 35°56′N 0°5′E
- Country: Algeria
- Province: Mostaganem Province
- District: Mostaganem District

Area
  - Urban Settlement: 50 km^{2} (19 sq mi)
- Elevation: 104 m (341 ft)

Population (2008)
  - Urban Settlement: 145,696
  - Estimate (2026): 216,102
  - Density: 2,900/km^{2} (7,500/sq mi)
  - Urban: 236,150
  - Settlement (2008): 162,885
- Time zone: UTC+1 (CET)
- Postal code: 27000

Mostaganem (Arabic: مستغانم, romanized: Mustaghānim, Berber languages: ⵎⵓⵙⵜⴰⵖⴰⵏⵎ) is the capital city of Mostaganem province in northwest Algeria, and a major port on the Gulf of Arzew in the Mediterranean Sea. The city is located 72 kilometres (45 mi) east-northeast of Oran and about 280 kilometres (170 mi) southwest of Algiers.

Mostaganem is the second-largest city after Oran in Algeria's northwest, and the country's fourth-largest port. As of the 2019 census it had 406,190 inhabitants.

== Origins ==
Mostaganem is said to correspond to the ancient Punic port of Murustaga, and that after becoming part of the Roman Empire it was renamed Cartennae (also Cartenna or Cartennas) under the emperor Gallienus (253–268). However, Murustaga is the name by which Mostaganem was known when it became a Christian bishopric and by which it is referred to in the Catholic Church's list of episcopal sees. Cartennae is modern-day Ténès, a town 50 kilometres (31 mi) to the east of Mostaganem.

== History ==
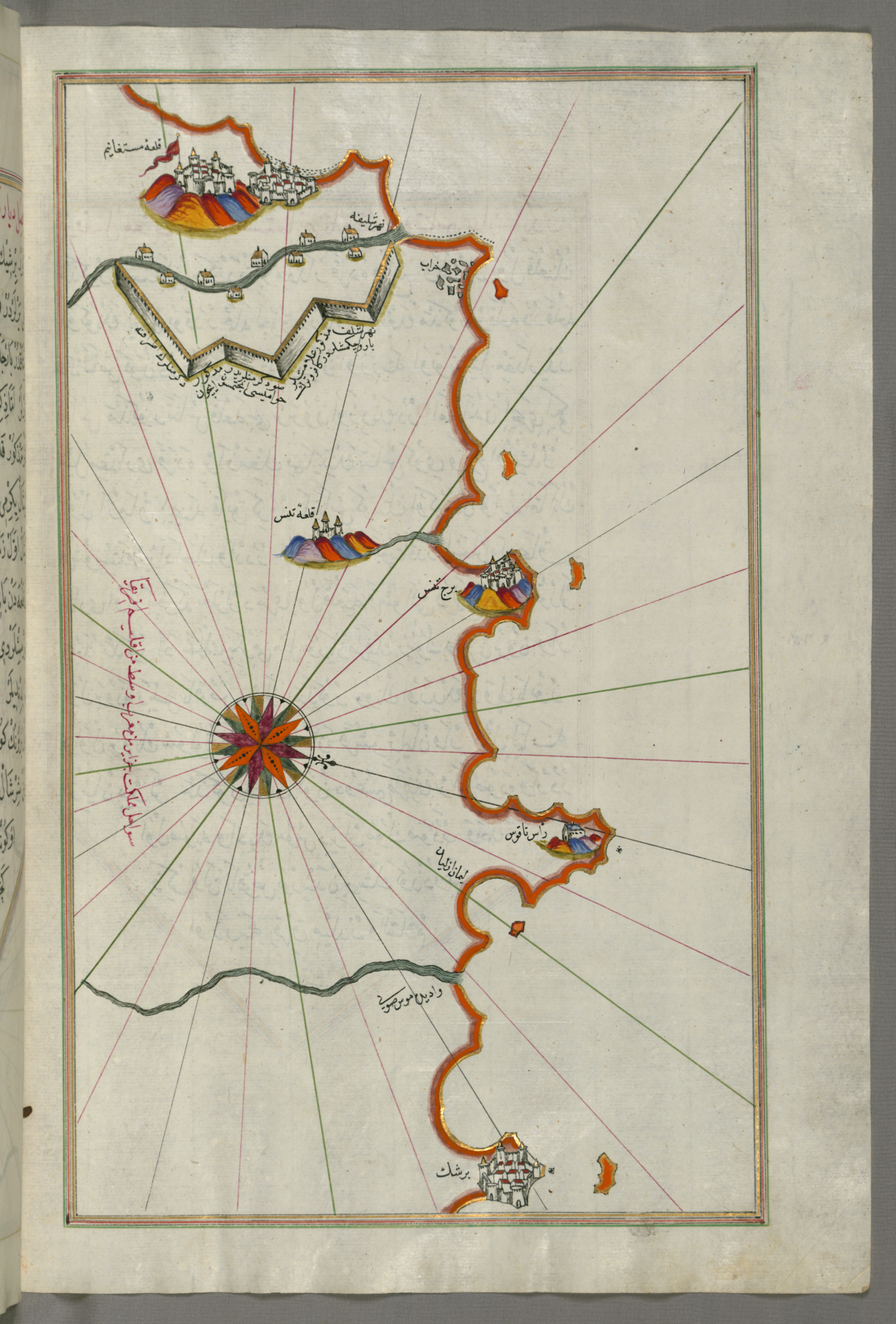
The coast of Mostaganem in Piri Reis's Kitab-ı Bahriye

Mostaganem reputedly has origins dating back to Punic and Roman times, and was ruled by the Zirid dynasty between 973 and 1146 CE. It was then conquered by the Almoravid dynasty and reached its high point of power under Yusuf ibn Tashfin. The city was later ruled by the Zayyanid dynasty of Tlemcen, who were conquered by the Marinid dynasty of Fes until the Zayyanid dynasty took back control of the city.

In the 16th century the town resisted a Spanish invasion but was captured by the Ottoman admiral Hayreddin Barbarossa and became a harbor for Mediterranean corsairs, as well as an important commercial port. By 1700 it had come under Ottoman rule, but in 1833 the city was taken by France and a garrison established.

In April 1943, during World War Two, the US Navy's "D" Company arrived in Mostaganem to build an amphibious port. Welcomed by the locals, the Allied forces turned the city into the largest base of its kind, with electricity, running water, roads, a hospital, and pontoon shops.

Algeria became independent in 1962 and Mostaganem is now the second-largest city in the country's northwest, after Oran, and Algeria's fourth-largest port. As of the 2019 census it had a population of 406,190.

== Geography ==
The city of Mostaganem is divided into two regions by the ravine of the Wadi Ain Sefra: the modern Eastern quarter, and the older Western quarter encompassing the historic Muslim city of Tidgit. The port and beaches occupy the south.

The city tripled in size between 1962 and 2004, spreading over 18 km (11 mi) of coastal zone. This growth, in combination with agricultural and industrial activities, has caused environmental concerns.

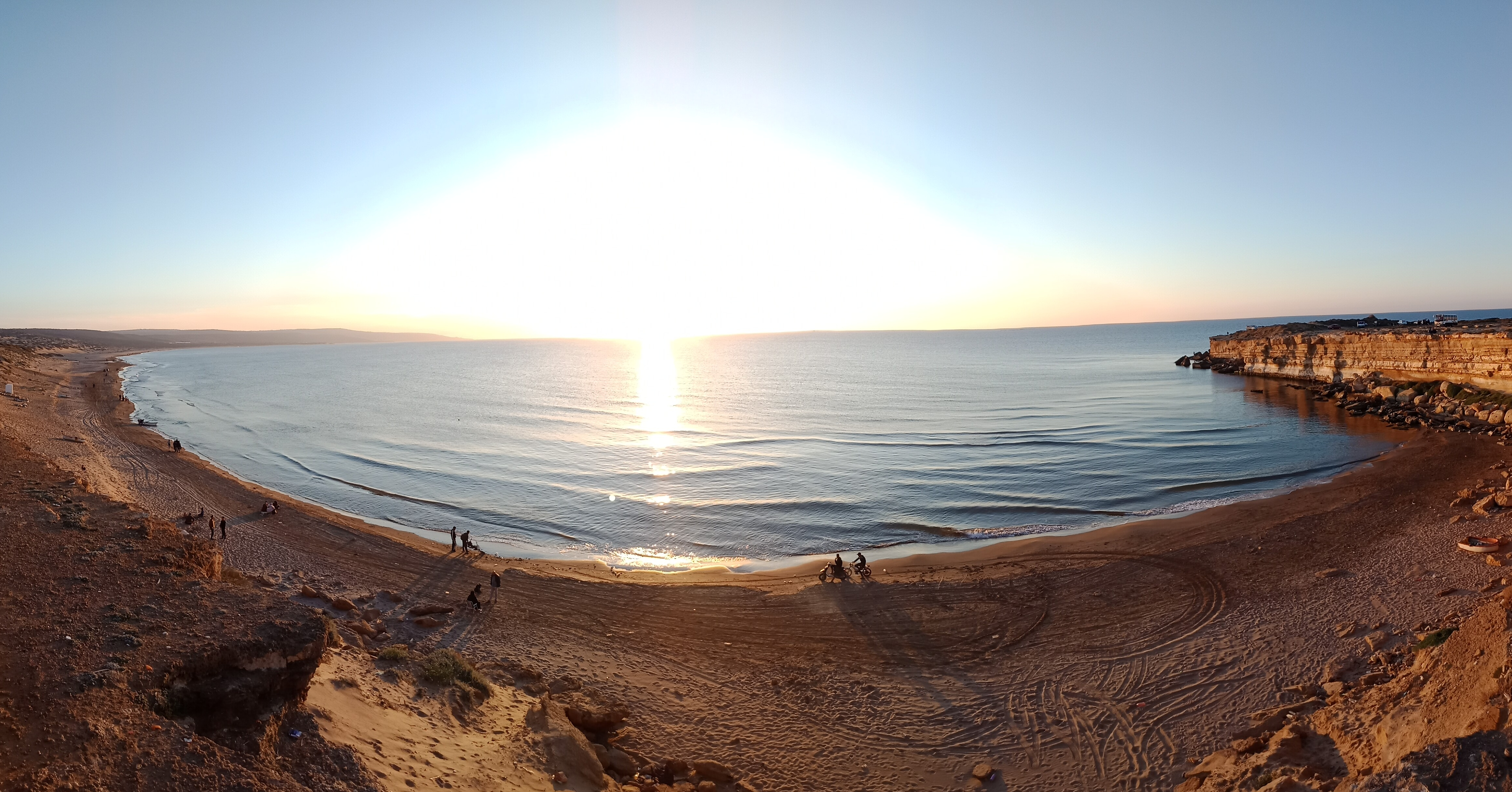
Sidi Lakhdar beach.

== Climate ==
Mostaganem has a mild Mediterranean climate (Köppen climate classification Csa), with more rainfall in winter than in summer. The average annual temperature is 17.9 °C (64.2 °F), and an average of about 347 mm (13.66 in) of precipitation falls annually. However, the Ain Sefra River flooded the city in 1900, and more recent flooding of the Cheliff River caused property damage and loss of life in 2000, 2001, 2010, and 2017.

Climate data for Mostaganem (1991-2020)
Month	Jan	Feb	Mar	Apr	May	Jun	Jul	Aug	Sep	Oct	Nov	Dec	Year
Record high °C (°F)	25.8 (78.4)	32.6 (90.7)	34.5 (94.1)	35.8 (96.4)	42.5 (108.5)	43.6 (110.5)	45.9 (114.6)	45.0 (113.0)	39.6 (103.3)	38.7 (101.7)	32.0 (89.6)	28.7 (83.7)	45.9 (114.6)
Mean daily maximum °C (°F)	16.2 (61.2)	17.0 (62.6)	19.2 (66.6)	21.3 (70.3)	24.5 (76.1)	28.3 (82.9)	31.6 (88.9)	32.3 (90.1)	28.7 (83.7)	25.2 (77.4)	20.0 (68.0)	17.3 (63.1)	23.5 (74.2)
Daily mean °C (°F)	11.0 (51.8)	11.7 (53.1)	13.6 (56.5)	15.7 (60.3)	18.9 (66.0)	22.6 (72.7)	25.7 (78.3)	26.4 (79.5)	23.3 (73.9)	19.7 (67.5)	15.0 (59.0)	12.3 (54.1)	18.0 (64.4)
Mean daily minimum °C (°F)	5.8 (42.4)	6.3 (43.3)	8.0 (46.4)	10.0 (50.0)	13.3 (55.9)	16.8 (62.2)	19.7 (67.5)	20.4 (68.7)	17.8 (64.0)	14.2 (57.6)	10.0 (50.0)	7.4 (45.3)	12.5 (54.5)
Record low °C (°F)	−2.2 (28.0)	−1.7 (28.9)	−1.4 (29.5)	0.2 (32.4)	4.1 (39.4)	6.6 (43.9)	11.0 (51.8)	10.7 (51.3)	8.0 (46.4)	4.2 (39.6)	−0.6 (30.9)	−2.0 (28.4)	−2.2 (28.0)
Average precipitation mm (inches)	56.7 (2.23)	46.9 (1.85)	36.4 (1.43)	38.1 (1.50)	23.6 (0.93)	3.9 (0.15)	1.3 (0.05)	3.0 (0.12)	22.4 (0.88)	33.4 (1.31)	69.5 (2.74)	55.4 (2.18)	390.6 (15.38)
Average precipitation days (≥ 1.0mm)	6.3	6.2	5.0	4.7	2.9	0.9	0.4	0.7	2.9	4.6	7.2	6.1	47.9
Average relative humidity (%)	77	76	77	69	72	69	68	64	70	74	75	71	72
Mean daily sunshine hours	6.6	7.6	7.9	8.9	9.9	10.8	11.5	10.9	9.4	8.2	7.4	6.7	8.8
Source 1: NOAA (temperatures, precipitation 1991–2020)
Source 2: Deutscher Wetterdienst (humidity 1976-1995, sun 1961-1990)

== Features ==
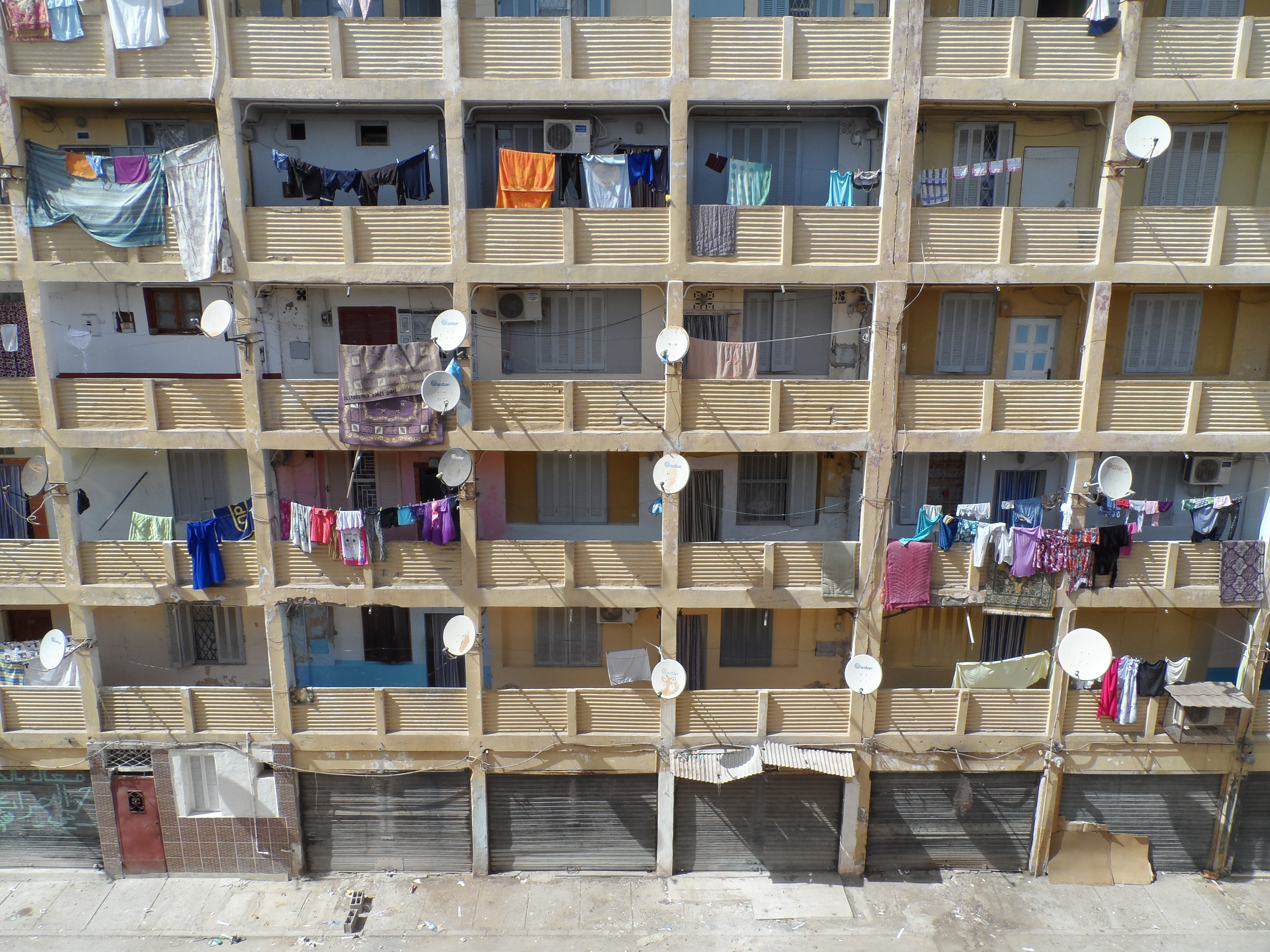
El Arsa

The city of Mostaganem features a port on the Mediterranean Sea that has a ferry, amusement park, commercial district, religious heritage sites, and beaches. This port is shared by large transport vessels and fishing boats alike, unloading cargo ranging from provisions to cars and pipelines, and as in most ports of Algeria sailors are not allowed to exit the port and visit the city. A new, smaller port for fishing boats has been constructed but is currently not used.

A tunnel under the city and toward the city center was completed in 2010 and changed traffic flow significantly. Mostaganem has no public airport and so the new autoroute from the capital Algiers towards Oran makes it easier to access Mostaganem by road from the capital.

Mostaganem is home to the University of Mostaganem, a college and medical provider established in 1979. The university is referred to locally as the University of Abdelhamid Ibn Badis (UMAB), after a popular figure in the Muslim reform movements of Algeria. The university offers degrees ranging from bachelors to doctorates in computer science, as well as medical doctorates.

The city's major sports teams are the association football clubs ESA Mostaganem and WA Mostaganem, both of whom play their home games in the Mohamed Bensaïd Stadium.

== Notable people ==
- Louis Franchet d'Espèrey, French general, born in Mostaganem in 1856
- Sheikh Hamada, musician
- Muhammad ibn Ali as-Senussi, poet
- Mohamed Chouikh, cinema director
- Ahmad al-Alawi, notable religious figure of the 20th century, born and later buried in Mostaganem
- Alain-Julien Rudefoucauld, French writer and playwright, born in Mostaganem in 1950
- Abdelkader Ouali politician, born in Mostaganem in 1952

== See also ==
- Mostaganem Airport
- Mostaganem Tramway
