= Amar Ghoul =

Algerian politician

Minister of Public Works and Transport
- In office 11 September 2013 – 5 May 2014
- Preceded by: Amar Tou
- Succeeded by: Boudjemaa Talai
- In office 25 February 2004 – 26 April 2004
- Preceded by: Abdelmalek Sellal
- Succeeded by: Mohamed Maghlaoui

Personal details
- Born: 21 February 1961 (age 65) Aïn Defla, Algeria

Amar Ghoul (Arabic: عمار غول; born 21 February 1961) is an Algerian politician and a former transport minister in the Algerian government.

== Biography ==
Amar Ghoul was born in the wilaya of Ain Defla. He obtained his bac in maths at school in Miliana in 1980. In 1986, he took the post of engineer of State Civil Engineering in à Rouiba (ع ن). He continued his studies and obtained a DEA in nuclear engineering. In 1989, he left for France and in 1991 obtained a Doctorate in nuclear engineering. In 1998, he gained a diploma from Oran where he became a Doctor of State Mechanical Engineering.

In the political field, he was elected in 1997 as an MP to the Assemblée populaire nationale for the MSP. He quickly became chairman of the parliamentary group.

== See also ==
- Cabinet of Algeria
