= Boudjemaa Talai =

Algerian politician (1952–2022)

Boudjemaa Talai MP
- بوجمعة طلعي

Member of the People's National Assembly
- In office 2017–2019
- Constituency: Annaba

Minister of Public Works and Transport
- In office 16 May 2015 – 6 April 2017
- President: Abdelaziz Bouteflika
- Preceded by: Amar Ghoul
- Succeeded by: Abdelghani Zaalane

Personal details
- Born: 17 May 1952 Cheffia, French Algeria
- Died: 6 August 2022 (aged 70) Algiers, Algeria
- Party: National Liberation Front
- Education: University of Annaba; University of Karlsruhe

Boudjemaa Talai (Arabic: بوجمعة طلعي, romanized: Būjamaʿa Ṭalaʿī; 17 May 1952 – 6 August 2022) was an Algerian engineer, corporate executive, and politician who served as the Algerian Minister of Public Works and Transport from 2015 to 2017. A member of the National Liberation Front, Talai also served as a member of the People's National Assembly from 2017 to 2019.

== Biography ==
=== Early life and career ===
Talai was born on 17 May 1952 in the town of Cheffia in French Algeria. He attended the University of Annaba, graduating in 1978 with a degree in civil engineering with a specialization in construction materials. From 1978 until 1980, Talai worked as a computer engineer for the Algerian National Iron and Steel Company at the El Hadjar Complex steel plant. From 1980 until 1984, Talai attended University of Karlsruhe in West Germany on a scholarship, graduating with a postgraduate certificate in construction infrastructure.

Following his graduation from the University of Karlsruhe, Talai worked as an engineer at various Algerian construction firms. From 2000 until 2003, Talai was the CEO of Batimetal, an Algerian engineering firm. He was also on the board of directors of several other companies.

=== Political career ===
On 16 May 2015, Talai was appointed by Abdelaziz Bouteflika, the president of Algeria, to be the Minister of Transport and Public Works, replacing Amar Ghoul, who was appointed to another ministry. Talai held this role until 6 April 2017. During his tenure as minister, Talai oversaw the modernization of Algeria's mining railway infrastructure. Following the 2017 Algerian legislative election, Talai was elected to represent the Annaba constituency as a member of the National Liberation Front. He resigned from parliament sometime before June 2019.

On 23 September 2019, Talai and several other former ministers from the Bouteflika government were arrested following a corruption scandal which involved businessman Ali Haddad. This scandal was part of the cause for the 2019 Algerian protests. On 7 July 2020, Talai was convicted of abuse of office; he was sentenced to three years in the Koléa prison and fined 500,000 dinars.

Talai was released early from prison on 1 June 2022. Talai died on 6 August 2022 at the age of 70 in the Mustapha Pacha hospital in Algiers from a kidney disease.
