= Dalila Boudjemaa =

Algerian agricultural engineer and politician

- دليلة بوجمعة
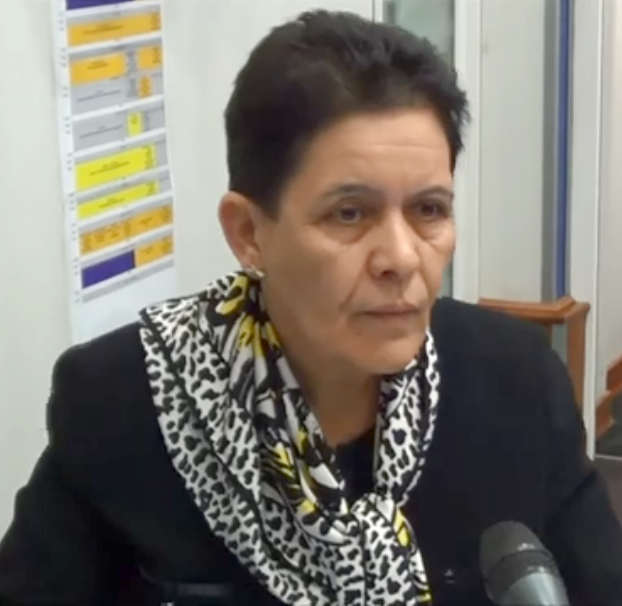
- In a 2014 interview with Radio Algeria

Minister of the Environment in the Government of Algeria
- In office 21 February 2021 – 7 July 2021
- President: Abdelmadjid Tebboune
- Prime Minister: Abdelaziz Djerad
- Preceded by: Nassira Benharrats

Dalila Boudjemaa (Arabic: دليلة بوجمعة) is an Algerian agricultural engineer and politician. She was Minister of Regional Planning and the Environment in the Government of Algeria (2013 to 2015) and Minister of the Environment in the Government of Algeria (2021).

== Biography ==
Boudjemaa was secretary of state to the minister of regional planning in 2012. In September 2013, she was promoted to Minister of Regional Planning and the Environment. In June 2015, Boudjemaa was ousted from the government when her department was abolished and attached to the Ministry of Water Resources.

In 2020, Boudjemaa was an advisor to the president of the Republic of Algeria, responsible for ecology.

Following a ministerial reshufflimg on 21 February 2021, Boudjemaa was reappointed as minister of the environment in the Third Djerad government, replacing Nassira Benharrats. She attended the 31st session of the African Ministerial Conference on the Environment (AMCEN). She held the office until 7 July 2021.

Boudjemaa is in favour of the exploitation of shale gas, which she claims has no impact on the environment. She has also encouraged Technical Landfill Centers (CET) to exploit their large stocks of waste to generate income as "waste has now become an economic issue," and has called for legislation to limit "the dangers of the use of plastic on health and the environment."
