= University of Mostaganem =

University in Mostaganem, Algeria

Coordinates: 35.9325°N 0.0877°E

University Abdelhamid Ibn Badis Mostaganem
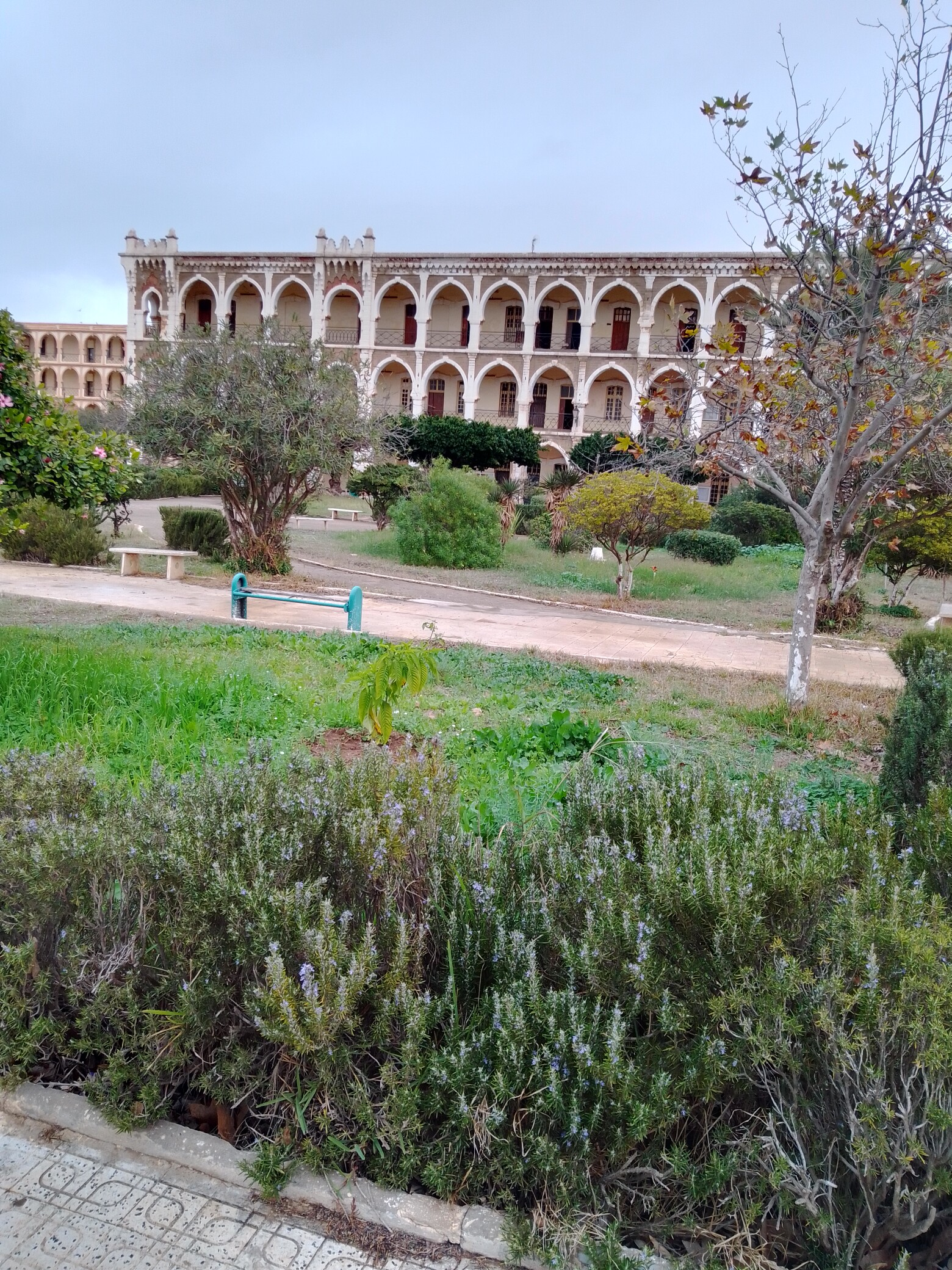
- Type: Public
- Established: 1978
- Location: Mostaganem, Algeria
- Campus: Urban
- Nickname: UMOSTAG
- Website: University website

The University of Mostaganem Abdel-Hamid ibn Badis is a university, located in Mostaganem, Algeria. It was founded in 1978.

The university bears the name of Abdelhamid Ben Badis, an emblematic figure of the Muslim reform movement in Algeria, who was a teacher, philosopher, and journalist. The University has nine faculties, including: medicine, science and technology, exact sciences and informatics, nature and life, foreign languages, Arabic literature and arts, law and political science, economics commerce and management sciences, and social sciences, in addition to an institute of sports and physical education.

== See also ==
- List of universities in Algeria
