= Ministry of energy =

Government ministry focusing on energy sector and energy policy

A ministry of energy or department of energy is a government department in some countries that typically oversees the production of fuel and electricity; in the United States, however, it manages nuclear weapons development and conducts energy-related research and development. The person in charge of such a department is usually known as a minister of energy or minister for energy.

- Ministry of Energy and Water (Afghanistan)
- Ministry of Energy and Mining (Algeria)
- Ministry of Energy Infrastructures and Natural Resources (Armenia)
- Australia:
  - Department of Climate Change and Energy Efficiency (superseded 2013)
  - Department of the Environment and Energy (from 2016)
- Ministry of Energy (Azerbaijan)
- Ministry of Energy, Science & Technology and Public Utilities (Belize)
- Ministry of Mines and Energy (Brazil)
- Ministry of Energy (Brunei)
- Ministry of Economy, Energy and Tourism (Bulgaria)
- Burundi Ministry of Energy and Mines
- Ministry of Mines and Energy (Cambodia)
- Canada:
  - Natural Resources Canada (federal)
  - Ministry of Energy (Alberta)
  - Department of Energy and Mines (New Brunswick)
  - Ministry of Energy (Ontario)
  - Ministry of Natural Resources and Wildlife (Quebec)
- Ministry of Mines and Energy (Colombia)
- Ministry of Climate, Energy and Building (Denmark)
- Directorate-General for Energy (European Union)
- Ministry of Electricity and Renewable Energy (Egypt)
- Ministry of Energy of Georgia
- Federal Ministry of Economic Affairs and Energy (Germany)
- Ministry of Energy and Petroleum (Ghana)
- Ministry of Energy (Guinea)
- Ministry of Environment and Energy (Greece)
- Ministry of Industry, Energy and Tourism (Iceland)
- India:
  - Ministry of Power
  - Ministry of New and Renewable Energy
  - Ministry of Petroleum and Natural Gas
- Ministry of Energy and Mineral Resources (Indonesia)
- Ministry of Energy (Iran)
- Ministry of Energy (Kazakhstan)
- Ministry of Energy and Water (Lebanon)
- Ministry of Energy (Lithuania)
- Ministry of Energy, Green Technology and Water (Malaysia)
- Secretariat of Energy (Mexico)
- Ministry of Energy (Moldova)
- Ministry of Energy (Myanmar)
- Ministry of Energy (Nepal)
- Ministry of Petroleum and Energy (Norway)
- Ministry of Water and Power (Pakistan)
- Ministry of Energy and Mines (Peru)
- Department of Energy (Philippines)
- Ministry of Energy (Poland)
- Ministry of Energy and Minerals (Puntland)
- Ministry of Energy (Russia)
- Ministry of Energy, Industry and Mineral Resources (Saudi Arabia)
- Ministry of Mining and Energy (Serbia)
- Ministry of Energy & Minerals (Somaliland)
- Department of Energy (South Africa)
- Ministry of Energy and Electrification (Soviet Union)
- Ministry of Power and Energy (Sri Lanka)
- Ministry of the Environment and Energy (Sweden)
- Ministry of Energy (Syria)
- Ministry of Energy and Minerals (Tanzania)
- Ministry of Energy (Thailand)
- Ministry of Mines and Energy (Togo)
- Ministry of Energy (Turkmenistan)
- Ministry of Energy and Mineral Development (Uganda)
- Ministry of Energy and Coal Mining (Ukraine)
- United Kingdom:
  - Department of Energy (United Kingdom) (superseded 1992)
  - Department of Energy and Climate Change (superseded 2016)
  - Department for Business, Energy and Industrial Strategy (superseded 2023)
  - Department for Energy Security and Net Zero (from 2023)
- United States Department of Energy
- Ministry of Energy (Zambia)
- Ministry of Energy and Power Development (Zimbabwe)

Ministers for Energy:

- Minister for the Environment and Energy (Australia)
- Minister of Energy (Belgium)
- Minister of Energy, Mines and Resources (Canada)
- Minister for Energy (Ireland)
- List of ministers for energy of Luxembourg
- Minister for Energy (Sweden)
- Minister for Energy (Western Australia)

== See also ==
- Ministry of Petroleum
