= Abdiweli Hersi Indhoguran =

Puntland politician

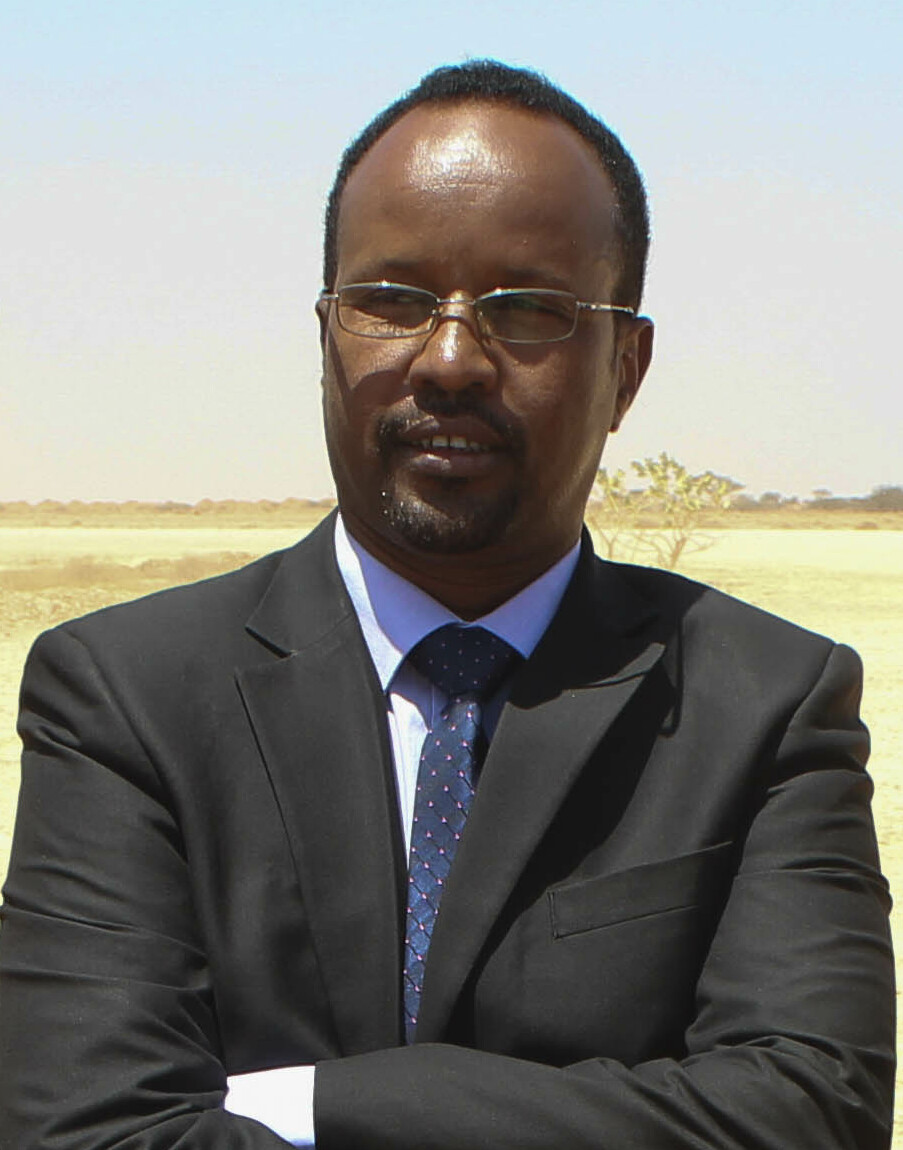

Puntland Minister of Youth and Sports
- In office 2009–2014
- President: Abdirahman Farole
- Vice President: Abdisamad Ali Shire

Personal details
- Born: Cabdiwali Xirsi Cabdulle
- Party: Independent

Abdiweli Hersi Abdulle (Indhoguran), Somali: Cabdiwali Xirsi Cabdulle 'Indhoguran'; born 1969) is a Somali politician and held several positions of minister of electricity and power generation of the Transitional National Government (TNG) of Somalia, various positions including Minister of Commerce, Minister of Information, and Minister of Labor, Youth and Sports for the Government of Puntland. From 1992 to 1997, he was the minister of labour and social affairs of Somali region state of Ethiopia and head of social affairs sector. From 1994 to 1997, he was the Head of Disaster Prevention and Preparedness committee of Somali regional state of Ethiopia and member of parliament.
