= Trevor (duck) =

Niuean duck (d. 2019)

- Species: Anas platyrhynchos (mallard)
- Sex: Male
- Died: January 2019
- Nationality: Niue
- Known for: Unexplained arrival
- Named after: Trevor Mallard

Trevor (died January 2019) was a mallard duck that made a vagrant appearance in the island country of Niue in January 2018. He remained in Niue until he died in 2019.

== Life ==
Trevor began receiving media attention when The New Zealand Herald journalist Claire Trevett encountered the duck on a visit to Niue and reported on his appearance in an article published in September 2018, at which point Trevor's story gained coverage from worldwide news sources. Mallard ducks are not endemic to Niue, and the country's habitat is not suitable for them, as Niue lacks any surface fresh water, which mallards require. Trevor lived as a local celebrity in a particular roadside puddle which the Niue Fire Service would refill when it began to dry out; Trevett learned of Trevor when she asked for directions and was told to "turn right past the duck".

Commentators hypothesised that he was either blown off course by a storm or stowed away on a ship, as the distance from New Zealand – where mallards have been introduced – is too great for the duck to have flown under his own effort. New Zealand mallards are known to migrate long distances. Vagrant mallards from New Zealand have colonised Pacific and Southern Ocean islands including Lord Howe Island, Norfolk Island and Macquarie Island.

Hundreds of kilometres from any other duck and without a mate, he was known as "the world's loneliest duck", although accompanied by a rooster, a chicken and a weka.

Trevor was named after Trevor Mallard, Speaker of the New Zealand House of Representatives. As Niue is freely-associated with New Zealand, political scientists have described this as a use of geopolitical soft power. The Foreign Minister of New Zealand arranged for veterinarians from Auckland to assist Niue's Department of Agriculture, Forestry and Fisheries in caring for the duck.

== Death ==
On 23 January 2019, a Facebook page named after Trevor expressed dismay that Trevor had not been seen in his regular habitat. Two days later, on 25 January, a follow-up post confirmed that Trevor had been "seen dead in the bush after being attacked by dogs". Trevor was mourned locally and Niue received condolences from around the world, including from his namesake politician.

== See also ==
- List of individual birds
- Bird migration – Seasonal movement of birds
- Jade – New Zealand sea lion (2016–2024)
