= Abdul Wali =

Abdul Wali, Abduwali, Abdiweli, or Abdilweli (Arabic: عبد الولي) can be both a given name and a surname. Notable people with the name include:

== Given name ==
- Abdiweli Sheikh Abdillahi, Somali politician
- Abduwali Ablet (born 1987), Chinese football left-back
- Abdiweli Sheikh Ahmed (born 1959), Somali economist, diplomat and politician
- Abdiweli Mohamed Ali (born 1965), Somali economist and politician
- Abdul Wali (torture victim) (ca. 1975–2003), Afghan who died in US custody
- Abdiweli Gaas, prime minister of Somalia
- Abdiweli Hersi Indhoguran, Somali politician
- Khan Abdul Wali Khan (1917–2006), Pashtun activist against the British Raj, senior politician in Pakistan and writer
- Abduwali Muse (born ca. 1992), Somali accused of piracy
- Abdiweli Ibrahim Sheikh Muudey, Somali politician
- Abdul-Wali al-Shameri, Yemeni diplomat

== Surname ==
- Mohammad Abdul-Wali (1940–1973), Yemenite diplomat and writer
- Abdul Wali or Omar Khalid Khorasani (ca. 1977 – 2022), Pakistani militant
