= List of agriculture ministries =

An agriculture ministry (also called an agriculture department, agriculture board, agriculture council, or agriculture agency, or ministry of rural development) is a ministry charged with agriculture. The ministry is often headed by a minister for agriculture.

Specific duties may relate to regulation, promotion, agricultural research, price supports and agricultural subsidies, plant diseases, invasive species and the management of biosecurity. Some countries have multiple agriculture ministries, devoting entire ministries to be more specific; policy areas such as: forestry and fisheries; rural affairs; food and food quality, security, and safety; consumer protection; and matters relating to the Environment.

== Agriculture ministries by country ==
Country	Subnational division	Office	Head
Afghanistan		Ministry of Agriculture, Irrigation and Livestock	Minister of Agriculture
Argentina		Ministry of Agriculture, Livestock and Fisheries	Minister of Agriculture, Livestock and Fisheries
Armenia		Ministry of Agriculture of Armenia	Minister of Agriculture
Australia	Nationwide	Department of Agriculture, Fisheries & Forestry	Minister for Agriculture, Fisheries & Forestry; Minister for the Environment; Minister for Resources
Australia	New South Wales	Department of Primary Industries & Regional Development	Minister for Agriculture
Australia	Queensland	Department of Agriculture & Fisheries	Minister for Agricultural Industry Development & Fisheries
Australia	Tasmania	Department of Natural Resources & Environment	Minister for Primary Industries & Water
Australia	(Victoria (state)) Victoria	Department of Energy, Environment & Climate Action	Minister for Agriculture
Australia	Western Australia	Department of Primary Industries & Regional Development	Minister for Agriculture & Food
Azerbaijan		Ministry of Agriculture of Azerbaijan Republic	Minister of Agriculture
Bahamas		Ministry of Agriculture and Marine Resources	Minister of Agriculture and Marine Resources
Bangladesh	Agriculture	Ministry of Agriculture	Minister of Agriculture
Bangladesh	Food	Ministry of Food	Minister of Food
Bangladesh	Fisheries and Livestock	Ministry of Fisheries and Livestock	Minister of Fisheries and Livestock
Belgium	Flanders	Ministry of Agriculture and Fisheries	Minister of Agriculture
Belgium	Wallonia	General Operational Direction of Agriculture, Natural Resources and Environment	Minister of Agriculture
Bolivia		Ministry of Rural Development and Lands	Minister of Rural Development and Lands
Bhutan		Ministry of Agriculture and Livestock	Minister of Agriculture and Livestock
Brazil		Ministry of Agriculture, Livestock, and Supply	Minister of Agriculture, Livestock, and Supply
Brunei		Ministry of Primary Resources and Tourism	Minister of Primary Resources and Tourism
Bulgaria		Ministry of Agriculture and Food, 1986, 1987-1990, 1999-2007 Ministry of Agriculture and Forestry	Minister of Agriculture and Food, Minister of Agriculture and Forestry
Cambodia		Ministry of Agriculture, Forestry and Fisheries	Minister of Agriculture, Forestry and Fisheries
Canada	Agriculture	Agriculture and Agri-Food Canada	Minister of Agriculture
Canada	Fisheries	Fisheries and Oceans Canada	Minister of Fisheries and Oceans
Canada	Forestry	Natural Resources Canada	Minister of Natural Resources
Canada	Manitoba	Manitoba Agriculture, Food and Rural Initiatives	Minister of Agriculture
Canada	New Brunswick	Department of Agriculture and Aquaculture	Secretary of Agriculture and Aquaculture
Canada	Ontario	Ministry of Agriculture, Food and Rural Affairs	Minister of Agriculture, Food and Rural Affairs
Canada	Quebec	Ministry of Agriculture, Fisheries and Food	Minister of Agriculture, Fisheries and Food
Canada	Saskatchewan	Ministry of Agriculture	Minister of Agriculture
Chile		Ministry of Agriculture	
China	Historic	Ministry of Agriculture	Minister of Agriculture
China	Agriculture	Ministry of Agriculture and Rural Affairs	Minister of Agriculture and Rural Affairs
China	Forestry	State Forestry and Grassland Administration	Director of the State Forestry and Grassland Administration
Colombia		Ministry of Agriculture and Rural Development	
Croatia		Ministry of Agriculture	
Cuba		Ministry of Agriculture	Minister of Agriculture
Denmark		Ministry of Food, Agriculture and Fisheries	Minister of Food, Agriculture and Fisheries
Egypt		Ministry of Agriculture and Land Reclamation	
Estonia		Ministry of Agriculture	Minister of Agriculture
Ethiopia		Ministry of Agriculture and Rural Development	
European Union		Directorate-General for Agriculture and Rural Development	Commissioner for Agriculture and Rural Development
Finland		Ministry of Agriculture and Forestry	Minister of Agriculture and Forestry
France		Ministry of Agriculture, Food, Fisheries, Rural Affairs and Regional Planning	Minister of Agriculture, Food, Fisheries, Rural Affairs and Regional Planning
Germany		Federal Ministry of Food and Agriculture	
Georgia		Ministry of Agriculture	Minister of Agriculture
Ghana		Ministry of Food and Agriculture	Minister of Food and Agriculture
Greece		Ministry of Rural Development and Food	Minister of Rural Development and Food
Guatemala		Ministry of Agriculture, Livestock and Food	Minister of Agriculture, Livestock and Food
Hong Kong		Agriculture, Fisheries and Conservation Department	Director of Agriculture, Fisheries and Conservation
Hungary		Ministry of Agriculture	Minister of Agriculture
Iceland		Ministry of Fisheries and Agriculture	Minister of Fisheries and Agriculture
India	Nationwide	Ministry of Agriculture and Farmers' Welfare	Minister of Agriculture and Farmers' Welfare
India	Nationwide	Ministry of Rural Development	Minister of Rural Development
India	States and Union Territories	Department of Agriculture Development & Farmers' Welfare (Kerala); Department of Agriculture and Horticulture (Assam); Department of Agriculture (Tamil Nadu); Department of Agriculture (Andhra Pradesh); Department of Forests (West Bengal); Department of Rural Development (Jharkhand)	Minister for Agriculture of the states
Indonesia	Food	Coordinating Ministry of Food	Coordinating Minister of Food
Indonesia	Agriculture	Ministry of Agriculture	Minister of Agriculture
Indonesia	Forestry	Ministry of Forestry	Minister of Forestry
Indonesia	Fisheries	Ministry of Marine Affairs and Fisheries	Minister of Marine Affairs and Fisheries
Iran		Ministry of Agriculture	Minister of Agriculture
Iraq		Ministry of Agriculture	
Ireland		Department of Agriculture, Food and the Marine	Minister for Agriculture, Food and the Marine
Isle of Man		Minister for Agriculture, Fisheries and Forestry	
Israel		Ministry of Agriculture and Rural Development	Oded Forer
Kiribati		Ministry of Environment, Lands and Agricultural Development	
Italy		Ministry of Agricultural, Food and Forestry Policies	
Japan		Ministry of Agriculture, Forestry and Fisheries	
Kazakhstan		Ministry of Agriculture	Minister of Agriculture
Laos		Ministry of Agriculture and Forestry	Minister of Agriculture and Forestry of Laos
Lithuania		Ministry of Agriculture	Minister of Agriculture of Lithuania
North Macedonia		Ministry of Agriculture, Forestry and Water Economy	Minister of Agriculture, Forestry and Water Economy
Malaysia		Ministry of Agriculture and Food Security	Minister of Agriculture and Food Security
Maldives		Ministry of Agriculture and Animal Welfare	Minister of Agriculture and Animal Welfare
Mexico		Secretariat of Agriculture, Livestock, Rural Development, Fisheries and Food (SAGARPA)	Secretary of Agriculture, Livestock, Rural Development, Fisheries and Food
Moldova		Ministry of Agriculture and Food Industry	Minister of Agriculture and Food Industry
Myanmar		Ministry of Agriculture and Irrigation	Minister of Agriculture and Irrigation
Nepal		Ministry of Agriculture and Livestock Development	Minister of Agriculture and Livestock Development
Netherlands		Ministry of Agriculture, Fisheries, Food Security and Nature	Minister of Agriculture, Fisheries, Food Security and Nature
New Zealand		Ministry for Primary Industries	Minister for Primary Industries
Nigeria	Nationwide	Federal Ministry of Agriculture and Rural Development	
Nigeria	Rivers State	Rivers State Ministry of Agriculture	
Niue		Department of Agriculture, Forestry and Fisheries	Director of Department of Agriculture, Forestry and Fisheries
North Korea	Agriculture	Ministry of Agriculture	Minister of Agriculture
North Korea	Fisheries	Ministry of Fisheries	Minister of Fisheries
North Korea	Forestry	Ministry of Forestry	Minister of Forestry
Norway	Agriculture	Ministry of Agriculture and Food	Minister of Agriculture and Food
Norway	Fisheries	Ministry of Fisheries and Coastal Affairs	
Panama	Agriculture and Livestock	Ministry of Agricultural Development	Minister of Agricultural Development
Panama	Fisheries	Panama Aquatic Resources Authority	General administrator of Panama Aquatic Resources Authority
Pakistan		Ministry of National Food Security & Research	Minister for National Food Security & Research
Peru		Ministry of Agriculture/Coordinator FAO-ONU	Rafael Quevedo Flores/Francisco Costa Esparza
Philippines		Department of Agriculture	Secretary of Agriculture
Poland		Ministry of Agriculture and Rural Development	
Portugal		Ministry of Agriculture	Minister of Agriculture
Puntland		Ministry of Agriculture and Irrigation	Minister of Agriculture and Irrigation
Romania		Ministry of Agriculture and Rural Development	
Russia		Ministry of Agriculture	Minister of Agriculture
Saudi Arabia		Ministry of Environment, Water, and Agriculture	Minister of Environment, Water, and Agriculture
South Africa		Department of Agriculture	Minister of Agriculture
South Korea	Agriculture	Ministry of Agriculture, Food and Rural Affairs	
South Korea	Fisheries	Ministry of Oceans and Fisheries	
South Sudan		Ministry of Agriculture and Forestry	
Spain		Ministry of Agriculture, Fisheries and Food	Minister of Agriculture, Fisheries and Food
Sri Lanka		Ministry of Agriculture	Minister of Agriculture
Sri Lanka		Department of Agriculture	Director General of Agriculture
Sweden		Ministry for Rural Affairs (2011–2014); Ministry of Agriculture (1900–2010)	Minister for Rural Affairs (2011–2014); Minister of Agriculture (1900–2010)
Syria		Ministry of Agriculture and Agrarian Reform	Minister of Agriculture and Agrarian Reform
Republic of China (Taiwan)		Ministry of Agriculture	Minister of Agriculture
Tajikistan		Ministry of Agriculture	Minister of Agriculture
Tanzania		Ministry of Agriculture	Minister of Agriculture
Thailand		Ministry of Agriculture and Cooperatives	Minister of Agriculture and Cooperatives
Timor-Leste		Ministry of Agriculture and Fisheries	Minister of Agriculture and Fisheries
Turkey		Ministry of Agriculture and Forestry	
Uganda		Ministry of Agriculture, Animal Industry and Fisheries	
Ukraine		Ministry of Agrarian Policy and Food	
United Kingdom	Historic	Ministry of Agriculture, Fisheries and Food, 1889–2002	Minister of Food (United Kingdom), 1916–21, 1939–58
United Kingdom	Nationwide	Department for Environment, Food and Rural Affairs	Secretary of State for Environment, Food and Rural Affairs
United Kingdom	Northern Ireland	Department of Agriculture, Environment and Rural Affairs	Minister of Agriculture, Environment, and Rural Affairs
United Kingdom	Scotland	Net Zero Directorates	Cabinet Secretary for Rural Affairs, Land Reform and Islands
United Kingdom	Wales	Rural Affairs Directorate	Cabinet Secretary for Rural Affairs
United States	Nationwide	United States Department of Agriculture	Secretary of Agriculture
United States	California	California Department of Food and Agriculture	
United States	Florida	Florida Department of Agriculture and Consumer Services	Florida Commissioner of Agriculture
United States	(Georgia (U.S. state)) Georgia	Georgia Department of Agriculture	Georgia Commissioner of Agriculture
United States	Illinois	Illinois Department of Agriculture	
United States	Michigan	Michigan Department of Agriculture	
United States	New Hampshire	New Hampshire Department of Agriculture, Markets, and Food	
United States	New Jersey	New Jersey Department of Agriculture	
United States	Oklahoma	Oklahoma Department of Agriculture, Food, and Forestry	
United States	Oregon	Oregon Department of Agriculture	
United States	Puerto Rico	Department of Agriculture	
United States	Tennessee	Tennessee Department of Agriculture	Commissioner of Agriculture of Tennessee
United States	Texas	Texas Department of Agriculture	
United States	Vermont	Agency of Agriculture Food and Markets	
United States	(Washington (state)) Washington	Washington State Department of Agriculture	Director of Agriculture
United States	West Virginia	West Virginia Department of Agriculture	Agriculture Commissioner
Uzbekistan		Ministry of Agriculture and Water Resources	Minister of Agriculture and Water Resources
Vietnam		Ministry of Agriculture and Rural Development	Minister of Agriculture and Rural Development
Yemen		Ministry of Agriculture and Irrigation	Minister of Agriculture and Irrigation
Zambia		Ministry of Agriculture	Minister of Agriculture
Zimbabwe		Ministry of Agriculture	Minister of Agriculture

== Former countries ==
Country	Office	Head
Rhodesia	Ministry of Agriculture	Minister of Agriculture

== See also ==
- GLOBALG.A.P
- Food administration
- Food and Agriculture Organization
- List of environmental ministries
- List of forestry ministries
