= Ministry of Justice, Constitution, Rehabilitation and Religious Affairs =

Ministry in the government of Puntland

- Wasaaradda Cadaaladda, Arrimaha Diinta iyo Dhaqan Celinta وزارة العدل والدستور والتأهيل والشؤون الدستورية والدينية

Agency overview
- Formed: 16 August 1998
- Jurisdiction: Government of Puntland
- Headquarters: Garowe, Puntland
- Minister responsible: Mohamed Abdiwahab Ahmed
- Website: https://mojcrar.pl.so

The Ministry of Justice, Constitution, Rehabilitation and Religious Affairs MoJCRAR (Somali: Wasaaradda Cadaaladda, Arrimaha Diinta iyo Dhaqan Celinta) is the governmental body of the Puntland Government responsible for Justice related to courts, prison reform and protection of prisoners rights, and overseeing all matters related to Constitution, Rehabilitation, as well as Hajj pilgrimage, awqaf and religious affairs. The ministry was one of the first ministries in 1998, following the establishment of Puntland. The first minister was Sheikh Ali Nour and since 2022 it has been headed by Mohamed Abdiwahab Ahmed.

== List of ministers ==
- Sheikh Ali Nour
- Barkhad Ali Salah
- Abdirizak Yasin Abdulle
- Ismail Mohamed Warsame
- Salah Habib Jama Mohamed
- Awil Sheikh Hamud
- Mohamed Abdiwahab Ahmed – current
