= Energy minister =

Descriptor for a cabinet member in charge of an economy's fuel and power sector

An energy minister is a position in many governments responsible for energy production and regulation, developing governmental energy policy, scientific research, nuclear weapons, and natural resources conservation. In some countries, environmental responsibilities are given to a separate environment minister.

In some countries, the minister is part of the cabinet and/or has diplomatic functions in addition to their respective portfolio.

== Country-related articles and lists ==
- Australia: Minister for the Environment and Water, for the Department of Climate Change, Energy, the Environment and Water
- Azerbaijan: Minister of Energy
- Bangladesh: Ministry of Power, Energy and Mineral Resources
- Belgium: Ministry of Energy
- Brazil: Ministry of Mines and Energy
- Botswana: Ministry of Minerals and Energy
- Canada: Minister of Natural Resources
- Denmark: Minister of Climate and Energy
- European Union: European Commissioner for Energy
- France: Ministry of Ecology, Sustainable Development and Energy
- Georgia: Ministry of Energy of Georgia
- Germany: Federal Ministry for Economic Affairs and Energy (since 2013)
- Greece: Minister for the Environment, Energy and Climate Change
- Hong Kong: Secretary for the Environment
- Iceland: Ministry of Industry, Energy and Tourism
- India: Ministry of Power
- Indonesia: Minister of Energy and Mineral Resources
- Ireland: Minister for Climate, Energy and the Environment
- Israel: Ministry of Energy
- Manitoba: Minister of Science, Energy, Technology and Mines
- Myanmar:Ministry of Electricity and Energy
- Lithuania: Ministry of Energy
- Malaysia: Minister of Natural Resources, Environment and Climate Change
- Moldova: Ministry of Energy
- Norway: Minister of Energy
- Netherlands: Ministry of Economic Affairs (Netherlands)
- Nepal: Minister of Energy, Water Resources and Irrigation
- New Zealand: Minister of Energy and Resources
- Pakistan: Ministry of Water and Power and Ministry of Science and Technology
- Peru: Ministry of Energy and Mines
- Philippines: Secretary of Energy
- South Africa: Minister of Mineral Resources and Energy
- Sweden: Minister for Enterprise and Energy
- Thailand: Minister of Energy
- United Kingdom: Secretary of State for Energy Security and Net Zero
  - Scotland: Cabinet Secretary for Climate Action and Energy
  - Wales: Cabinet Secretary for Economy, Energy and Planning
- United States: Secretary of Energy
- Vietnam: Ministry of Natural Resources and Environment (Vietnam)

== See also ==
- Energy law
- Ministry of Environment
- Ministry of Mines and Energy
- Ministry of Petroleum
- Ministry of Electricity
