= Ministry of Mines =

Ministry of Mines may refer to:

- Ministry of Mines (India)
- Ministry of Mines (Myanmar)
- Ministry of Mines and Minerals Development, Zambia
- Ministry of Mines and Mining Development (Zimbabwe)

== See also ==
- Minister of Mines (disambiguation)
- Ministry of Mines and Energy (disambiguation)
- Ministry of Mining (disambiguation)
