= Menv =

Menv may refer to:

- Menv, animation software related to Marionette and used for example in the production of Tin Toy
- MEnv, abbreviation of 'Master of Environmental Science', an environmental degree
- MENV, the early call sign for the ocean liner SS Elisabethville
- Ministry of the Environment
