= Youcef Yousfi =

Algerian politician (born 1941)

- يوسف يوسفي
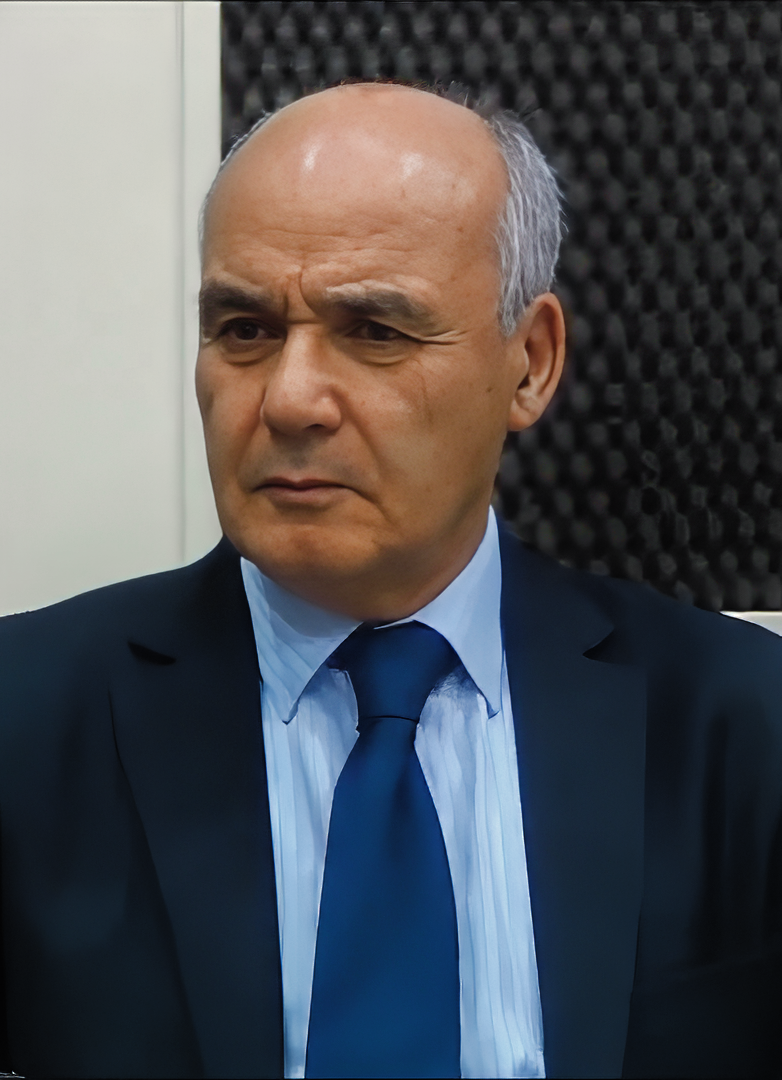

Prime Minister of Algeria Acting
- In office 13 March 2014 – 29 April 2014
- President: Abdelaziz Bouteflika
- Preceded by: Abdelmalek Sellal
- Succeeded by: Abdelmalek Sellal

Minister of Energy and Mining
- In office 28 May 2010 – 14 May 2015
- Prime Minister: Ahmed Ouyahia; Abdelmalek Sellal
- Preceded by: Chakib Khelil
- Succeeded by: Salah Khebri

Minister of Foreign Affairs
- In office 23 December 1999 – 28 August 2000
- Prime Minister: Ahmed Benbitour
- Preceded by: Ahmed Attaf
- Succeeded by: Abdelaziz Belkhadem

Personal details
- Born: 2 October 1941 (age 85) Batna, Algeria
- Party: National Rally for Democracy
- Education: Graduate School of Chemical Industries; Nancy University

Youcef Yousfi (Arabic: يوسف يوسفي) (born 2 October 1941) is an Algerian politician who was the country's Minister of Energy and Mines between 2010 and 2015. He briefly served as Acting Prime Minister of Algeria in March–April 2014. Yousfi was Algeria's Permanent Representative to the United Nations from 2006 to 2008.

== Early life and education ==
Born in Batna, Yousfi graduated from the École nationale supérieure des industries chimiques (National School of Chemical Engineering) in France, and obtained a PhD in physics from the Université de Nancy. He also has a degree in economics.

== Career ==
Yousfi was a senior lecturer, then a professor of chemical engineering at the National Polytechnic School, and then the Houari Boumediene University of Sciences and Technologies, both in Algiers. He was also director of the chemistry institute there. He was also an oil adviser at the Ministry of Industry and Energy.

In the late 1970s, Yousfi was appointed marketing vice-president at Sonatrach, and in 1985, he became its CEO. In 1996, he became chief of staff to Algerian President, Liamine Zéroual. In 1997, he was appointed Minister of Oil and Energy and was also first elected as a member of the People's National Assembly.

In early 1999, Yousfi became president of the Organization of the Petroleum Exporting Countries (OPEC). On 23 December 1999 he was appointed Minister of Foreign Affairs. He was replaced by Abdelaziz Belkhadem in the post in August 2000, when Yousfi moved on to become Minister-Delegate to Prime Minister, Ali Benflis.

In April 2001, Yousfi was nominated as Ambassador of Algeria to Canada, before becoming Permanent Representative to the United Nations in 2006.

On 1 July 2020, he was sentenced to 3 years in prison on corruption charges.

== Personal life ==
Yousfi is married and has three children.

Political offices
Preceded by Abdelmalek Sellal	Prime Minister of Algeria; Acting; 2014	Succeeded by Abdelmalek Sellal
