= Amine Mazouzi =

Algerian businessman

Amine Mazouzi (born 1965) is an Algerian engineer and the former CEO of the state-owned oil company Sonatrach. He was appointed by a presidential decree, succeeding Said Shannoun. He filled the position from 2015 to 2017. Mazouzi previously worked as the company's production development manager, prior to that he was responsible for studying and preparing strategies for the Hassi Messaoud oil field.

== Selected papers ==
- Amine, M., Djoudi, K., & Karas, I. R. (2021). "A new method for vehicles detection and tracking using information and image processing". International Journal of Electrical & Computer Engineering.
- El Ouahed, A. Kouider; Tiab, Djebbar; Mazouzi, Amine; Jokhio, Sarfraz A. (2003-10-20). "Application of Artificial Intelligence to Characterize Naturally Fractured Reservoirs".
- El Ouahed, Abdelkader Kouider; Tiab, Djebbar; Mazouzi, Amine (2005-12-15). "Application of artificial intelligence to characterize naturally fractured zones in Hassi Messaoud Oil Field, Algeria". Journal of Petroleum Science and Engineering.
