= Secretary of Energy (disambiguation) =

Secretary of Energy may refer to:

- United States Secretary of Energy, head of the US Department of Energy
- Secretary of Energy (Philippines), head of the Philippine Department of Energy
- The head of the Secretariat of Energy (Mexico)

== See also ==
- Energy minister, equivalent positions in various countries
