= PASW =

PASW may refer to

- Plant available soil water, in water science
- Predictive Analytics SoftWare (PASW), another name for SPSS statistical analysis software
- Skwentna Airport, ICAO code PASW
- Puntland Agency For Social Welfare, social welfare agency of Puntland state, Somalia
