= Hacen Mefti =

Algerian politician

Hacen Mefti (born 3 July 1937) was the Algerian minister for energy. He is a graduate of Dresden University and a former official with Sonatrach.
