= Ministry of Mining =

Ministry of Mining may refer to:

- Ministry of Mining (Chile)
- Ministry of Mining (Kenya)
- Ministry of Mining (Tanzania)

== See also ==
- Ministry of Mines (disambiguation)
- Minister of Mines (disambiguation)
- Ministry of Mines and Energy (disambiguation)
