= Minister of Mines =

Minister of Mines may refer to:

- Minister of Mines (Canada)
- Minister of Mines (India)
- Minister of Mines (New Zealand)
- Minister of Mines (Victoria), Australia

== See also ==
- Ministry of Mines (disambiguation)
- Ministry of Mines and Energy (disambiguation)
- Ministry of Mining (disambiguation)
