= ENSP Group - National Well Services Company =

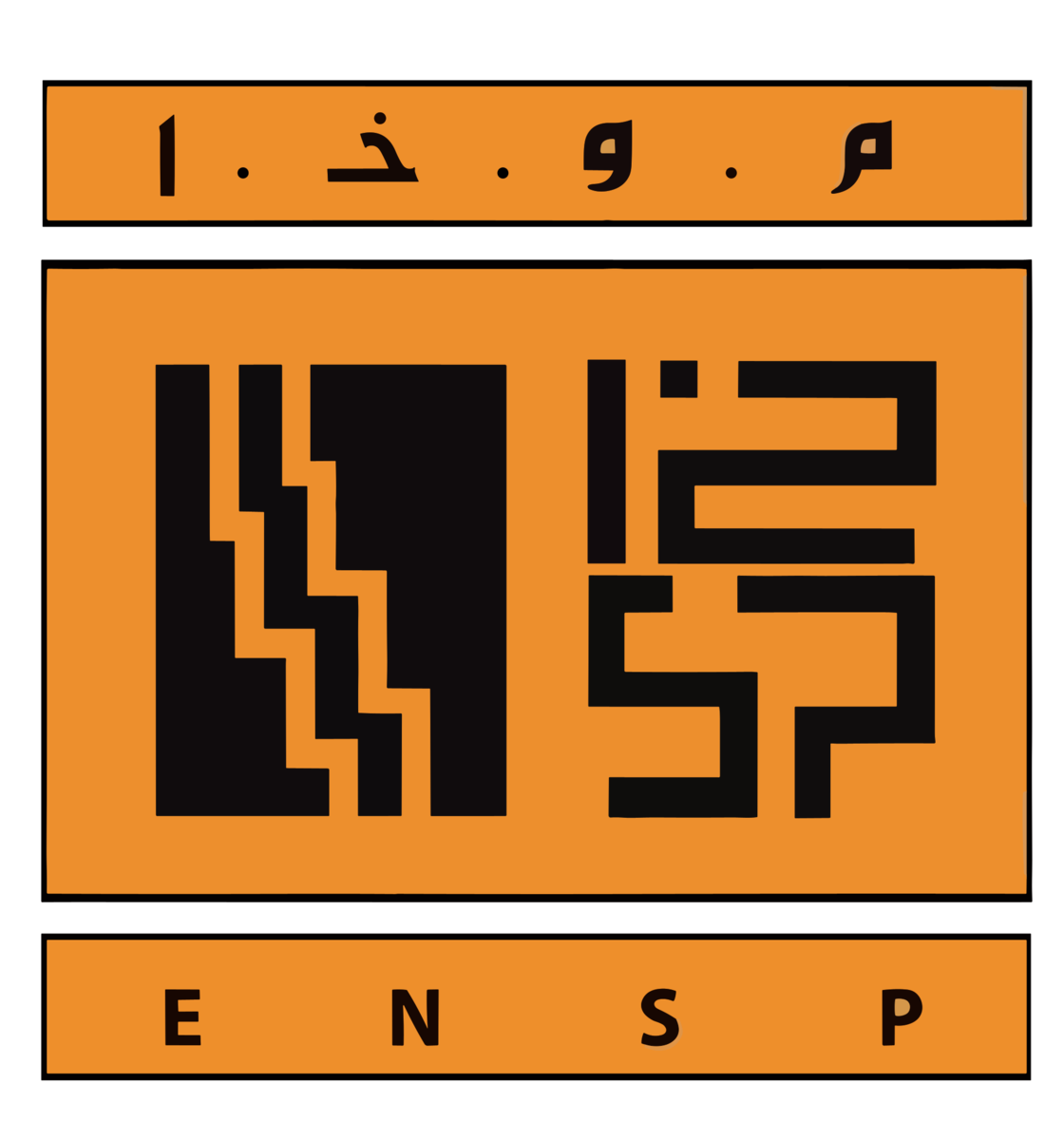
- Native name: Entreprise nationale de services aux puits
- Type: Subsidiary
- Industry: Oil and gas industry
- Founded: 1981; 45 years ago
- Headquarters: Hassi Messaoud, Algeria
- Key people: M. Abdallah Khellout
- Products: Oilfield services
- Owner: Sonatrach (51%)
- Website: www.enspgroup.com

National Well Services Company (ENSP; Arabic: المؤسسة الوطنية لخدمات الأبار) is an Algerian oilfield services company. It was established in 1981 and is a subsidiary of Sonatrach the Algerian national oil company.

== History ==
ENSP is a subsidiary of Sonatrach, the Algerian national oil company. It was established in 1981 during the restructuring of Sonatrach following a decision by the government. In 2006, the subsidiary was 51% owned by Sonatrach.

== Activities ==
ENSP's activities cover a wide range of well services, ranging from the daily maintenance of wellheads to the construction and cementing of wells for the entire Sonatrach group and its partners. Here is an overview of ENSP's main activities:

- Maintenance and servicing: ENSP ensures regular maintenance of wells, including wellhead maintenance, surface facility maintenance, and associated equipment. This includes checking, repairing, and replacing faulty or worn components.
- Well construction and cementing: ENSP is responsible for well construction, including the installation of casings and cementing of wells to ensure their structural integrity. These operations are essential for ensuring the safety and productivity of the wells.
- Drill stem testing (DST): When an oil field is discovered, ENSP performs DST to assess the nature of the fluid, measure oil, gas, and water production rates, and determine the well's potential. This helps make decisions regarding the well's production.
- Well intervention: ENSP intervenes in existing wells to address issues that could affect their production. This may include cleaning the wellbore, recording production parameters, repairing faulty equipment, and treating unwanted deposits.
- Hydraulic fracturing: Through its subsidiary BJSP (Algerian Company for the Stimulation of Hydrocarbon Producing Wells), in partnership with a multinational company, ENSP conducts hydraulic fracturing operations in oil reservoirs. This technique aims to enhance well productivity by creating fractures in the reservoir rock to facilitate hydrocarbon flow.
- Environmental protection services: ENSP places importance on environmental protection. It treats production effluents, both liquid and sludge, to prevent pollution. The company also develops technologies and tools to minimize the environmental impact of its activities.
- Training and skills development: ENSP implements training and skills development programs for its employees. It relies on coaching from senior personnel and training provided by Sonatrach's centers and schools to ensure the expertise of its managers and workers.

== Subsidiaries ==
ENSP has several subsidiaries established to support its activities:

- HESP: A subsidiary established in 1999 in partnership with Halliburton Energy Service. Its main mission is to conduct logging operations in vertical and horizontal wells.
- BJSP: A joint venture founded in 1986 in collaboration with BJ Services, an international company based in the United States. This subsidiary primarily focuses on cementing, stimulation, and coiled tubing.
- BASP: Another subsidiary created in 2003 by Chakib Khelil in collaboration with Halliburton. Its objective is to design, manufacture, and continuously regenerate oil drilling fluids.
- MESP: A joint venture formed in 1998 by the MESP group in partnership with MEDES, an Italian company specializing in the treatment of oil waste. In 2003, this group was transformed into a subsidiary, with ENSP holding 49% of the shares while MEDES held 51% of the capital.
