= Numhyd =

Numhyd is an oil company founded on 4 April 2003, jointly owned and managed by Algeria's Sonatrach and Tunisia's ETAP, who each own 50%. It is registered in Jersey, with offices in Algiers and Tunis. Its operations include oil fields in the Illizi basin (eastern Algerian Sahara) and the Kaboudia area offshore in Tunisia.

== Sources ==
- NUMHYD
- Oil and gas sector plays vital role in Tunisia’s economy
