= State Bank of Puntland =

Central bank in Puntland

State Bank of Puntland Bankiga Dhexe ee Dawladda Puntland
- Headquarters: Garowe, capital city; Bosaso, commercial city
- Coordinates: 8.404529°N 48.4793987°E
- Established: June 13, 1998; 27 years ago
- Ownership: 100% Government of Puntland
- Governor: Abdirisak Warsame Serar
- Central bank of: Puntland Government
- Currency: US Dollar; USD (ISO 4217)
- Website: statebank.pl.so

The State Bank of Puntland (SBP) (Somali: Bankiga Dhexe ee Dawladda Puntland) is the autonomous central banking institution for the Government of Puntland, managing public finances and monetary policy functions for the region and working to strengthen the local financial system. The bank was established in 1998 and operates nine branches across the regions which has owned and regulated by the autonomous state of Puntland.

Its headquarter located in the capital city of Garoowe As of 2026 the Governor of the bank is Abdirisak Warsame Serar.

== History ==
The State Bank of Puntland was establishment in 1998, and has since served as the backbone of Puntland’s financial system, driving economic growth and ensuring financial stability throughout the region. Headquartered in Garoowe, with nine strategically located branches, including those located in Bosaso, Galkayo , Qardho, Badhan and Calula SBP has expanding its financial services.

By 2025, the company employed around 200 staff members, including 90 at its headquarters. The bank is governed by Abdirisak Warsame Serar, with the General Director being Khadar Ugaas Abdi.

== Regulation ==
The bank relies on the financial regulations and legislation of the Federal Government of Somalia, as they don't currently have their own regulations in place. However, the bank is in the process of drafting a number of pieces of legislation, including Bank Licensing Regulation, AML regulation, Mobile Money Regulation and the Telecommunications Services Law.

== Currency ==
Puntland Government remains distinct from the Federal Government of Somalia in terms of currency and no longer uses the Somali shilling, having discontinued its use in 2021. Both the bank and the Puntland state as a whole now rely on the US dollar.

President of Puntland, Said Abdullahi Deni, announced plans to introduce the region's own currency in the future.

== See also ==
- Ministry of Finance (Puntland)
- Salaam Bank
