= Information Management Center =

Government Agency in Puntland

- Xarunta Cilmi Baarista ee Puntland وكالة إدارة المعلومات في بونتلاند

Agency overview
- Formed: 2019
- Jurisdiction: Government of Puntland
- Headquarters: Garowe, Puntland
- Agency executives: Director general; Abdinur Ali Jama
- Website: https://imcpuntland.so/

The Puntland Information Management Centre IMC (Somali: Xarunta Cilmi Baarista ee Puntland) is a government agency in Puntland, established in late 2019. It serves as a central hub for the collection, processing, analysis, and dissemination of data related to land and water resources. The IMC was founded to support sustainable development and environmental conservation efforts within the region. The agency was managed by Abdinur Ali Jama.

== Overview ==
The IMC was created in response to the growing need for reliable data to inform resource management in Puntland. Launched in late 2019, the agency aimed to address challenges related to land degradation, water scarcity, and climate variability. It operates under the Puntland government, aligning its activities with state and national development objectives.

On 6 December 2021, the EU and FAO handed over the new Information Management Centre (IMC) to the Puntland Government in Garowe. The ceremony was attended by President Said Abdullahi Deni, government officials, and FAO representatives.
