= Ministry of Fisheries and Marine Resources =

Government ministry in Puntland

- Wasaaradda Kaluumaysiga Badda iyo Khayraadka Badda وزارة الثروة السمكية والموارد البحرية

Agency overview
- Formed: 1 August 1998
- Jurisdiction: Government of Puntland
- Headquarters: Bosaso, Puntland
- Minister responsible: Abdirizak Abdullahi Haga
- Website: https://mofmr.pl.so/

The Puntland Ministry of Fisheries and Marine Resources MoFMR (Somali: Wasaaradda Kaluumaysiga Badda iyo Khayraadka Badda) is a government body responsible for overseeing fishing, fisheries management, and marine ecosystem services, including marine coastal ecosystems, coral reefs, and the blue economy. Its mandate includes the exploitation, preservation, and regeneration of the marine environment. It was established in 1998, its first minister was Mohamed Muse Keynan, and the current minister is Abdirizak Abdullahi Haga.

== List of ministers ==
- Mohamed Muse Keynan.
- Abdinuur Biindhe.
- Mohamoud Haji Salah.
- Rashid Mohamoud Yusuf.
- Abdirizak Abdullahi Haga, 2024–current.
