= Hassi Messaoud oil field =

Oil field in Algeria

Hassi Messaoud Oil Field
- Location within Algeria
- Country: Algeria
- Region: Ouargla Province
- Offshore/onshore: onshore
- Coordinates: 30.476264°N 5.240147°E
- Operator: Sonatrach

Field history
- Discovery: 1956
- Start of development: 1956
- Start of production: 1960

Production
- Current production of oil: 350,000 barrels per day (~1.7×10^{7} t/a)
- Estimated oil in place: 870 million tonnes (~ 1.0×10^{9} m^{3} or 6400 million bbl)

Hassi Messaoud Oil Field is an oil field located in Ouargla Province. It was discovered in 1956 by S.N. REPAL and developed by Sonatrach. The oil field is operated and owned by Sonatrach. The total proven reserves of the Hassi Messaoud oil field are around 6.4 billion barrels (870 million tonnes), and production is centered on 350,000 barrels per day (56,000 m^{3}/d).
