= LNG El Paso Sonatrach =

History
- Name: LNG El Paso Sonatrach
- Owner: El Paso Corp., Houston, Texas
- Builder: Dunkirk
- Cost: Ca. $120,000,000 USD
- Launched: 1977
- In service: 1978
- Out of service: 1980
- Fate: Scrapped, 1985

General characteristics
- Type: GT-type LNG carrier
- Length: 280.4 m (919 ft 11 in)
- Propulsion: Steam/Fuel Oil & LNG, 45,000 hp (34 MW)
- Speed: 22.5 knots (41.7 km/h; 25.9 mph)
- Capacity: 129,500 m^{3} (4,570,000 cu ft)
- Crew: Ca. 35 men

LNG El Paso Sonatrach was a liquefied natural gas carrier (LNG) of the El Paso Marine Corporation which was active in the late 1970s. Although she was US owned, the ship was registered in Liberia because of tax and economical reasons.

== History ==
El Paso Sonatrach was along with her sister ships Paul Kayser and Consolidated built in Dunkirk, France in 1977. They all operated out of the Consolidated Natural Gas Company Cove Point LNG import facility (now owned by Dominion Resources) in the Chesapeake Bay, Maryland. Liquefied natural gas (LNG) was loaded and shipped from a Sonatrach facility in Arzew, Algeria.

El Paso Sonatrach's Call sign was 5LIG. In addition to normal radio communication equipment, she was also equipped with satellite telecommunications equipment supplied by INMARSAT.

=== Paul Kayser incident ===
In 1979, the El Paso Paul Kayser (named after the founder of the El Paso Corporation) was stranded off the coast of Algeciras, Spain. She hit a rock pinnacle at 14 knots (26 km/h; 16 mph) and received severe damage to the outer hull and the containment system. However, her membrane LNG tanks held, and a major operation to save both the ship and her liquefied natural gas cargo was started. El Paso Sonatrach, which was heading for France for repairs was diverted to Algeria to get her tanks cooled down, which took one day. El Paso Sonatrach then proceeded to the location of Paul Kayser to transfer the cargo, an operation which took about three days. She then sailed to the United States to unload the cargo at Cove Point.

This was the first such transfer operation ever conducted at sea. The success of this rescue avoided a serious setback for the LNG industry. LNG, if spilled disperses rapidly and is a non-toxic liquid, however the extreme cold of LNG can present hazards until the liquid returns to a gaseous state. In its gaseous state, the vapor is primarily methane and quickly disperses into the air.

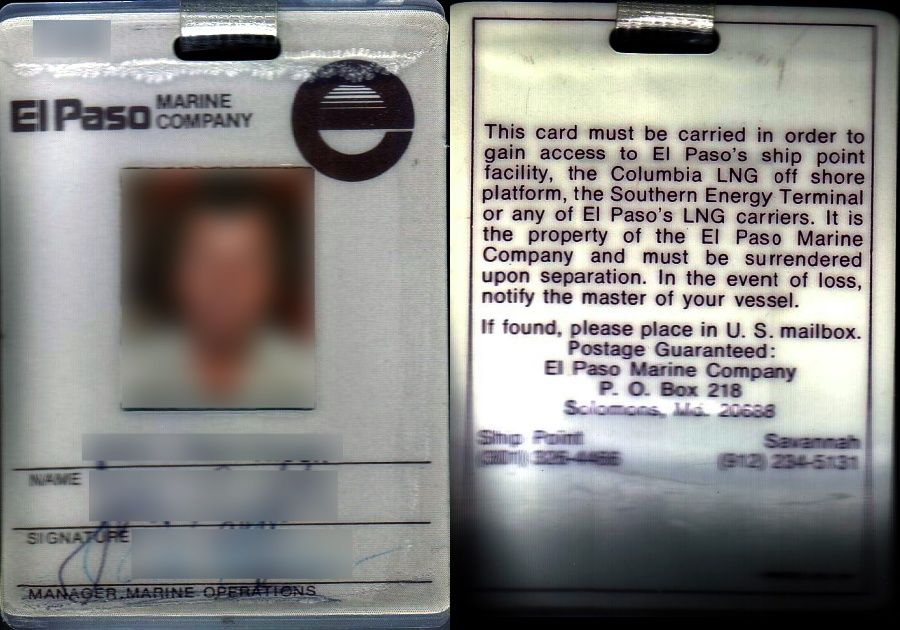
El Paso badge used by a crew member of El Paso Sonatrach

=== Norwegian crew ===
Originally, three of the El Paso tankers were crewed by Norwegian sailors. However, in 1979, the United States Congress (under President Jimmy Carter) decided that American sailors should be preferred as crewmembers on American ships to stop a rise in US unemployment. All the Norwegian sailors were subsequently replaced by American ones in August that year.

=== End of service ===
Until 1979, peak loads of LNG was being imported via four terminals, located in the continental United States. After 1979, the import volume declined dramatically, and the terminals were either mothballed or underutilized for two decades. The El Paso LNG tankers were all laid up to rust in 1980. During the period 1985–1987, El Paso Sonatrach and her sister ships were scrapped.

During the time she was operational, the Sonatrach made a total of 26 successful US - Algeria voyages.

== Unique propulsion plant ==
The boilers in these class of ships were unique in that they were dual-fueled. As on any other steam ship, the boilers operated on fuel oil; usually Bunker-C. Steam powered LNG carriers however, also burn natural gas. As the cargo tanks absorbed heat from the sea, a portion of the cryogenic LNG cargo boils off, changing from a liquid to a vapor (gas). As a result, pressure within the cargo tanks increases; similar to boiling water in a pressure cooker. To prevent rupturing the thin Invar tank material, pressure is controlled by venting the natural gas evaporate. Natural gas is either released to the atmosphere via vent stacks located above the cargo tanks or compressed and piped to the ship's boilers, which are designed to operate simultaneously on natural gas and fuel oil.

The ship's operator transported, but did not own the cargo. The otherwise vented natural gas was therefore a free source of fuel to propel and operate the ship, representing a substantial reduction in the ship's operating costs and source of profit.

When the ship entered port, the amount of energy produced by burning the evaporated LNG exceeded the ships needs. This generated excess steam which had to be removed from the boiler. Excess steam was passed through a desuperheater then routed to the propulsion turbine condenser. The desuperheated steam passed over condenser tubes cooled by seawater pumped through the inside of the metal tubes. Thus the energy contained in the evaporated LNG is transferred to the sea.

To ensure flammable natural gas was never vented to the atmosphere while in port, operability of this unique system was verified by the Coast Guard before the ship was allowed to enter U.S. waters.

== See also ==
- Sonatrach

== Resources ==
- In addition to the links mentioned above, the Norwegian Chief Radio Electronics Officer who served aboard El Paso Sonatrach has provided information for this article.
- Propulsion Plant information added by El Paso Marine's Main Propulsion Automation Supervisor (1978–1980)
