= Ministry of Energy and Mining (Algeria) =

Government ministry of Algeria

- Logo of the Algerian Ministry of Energy

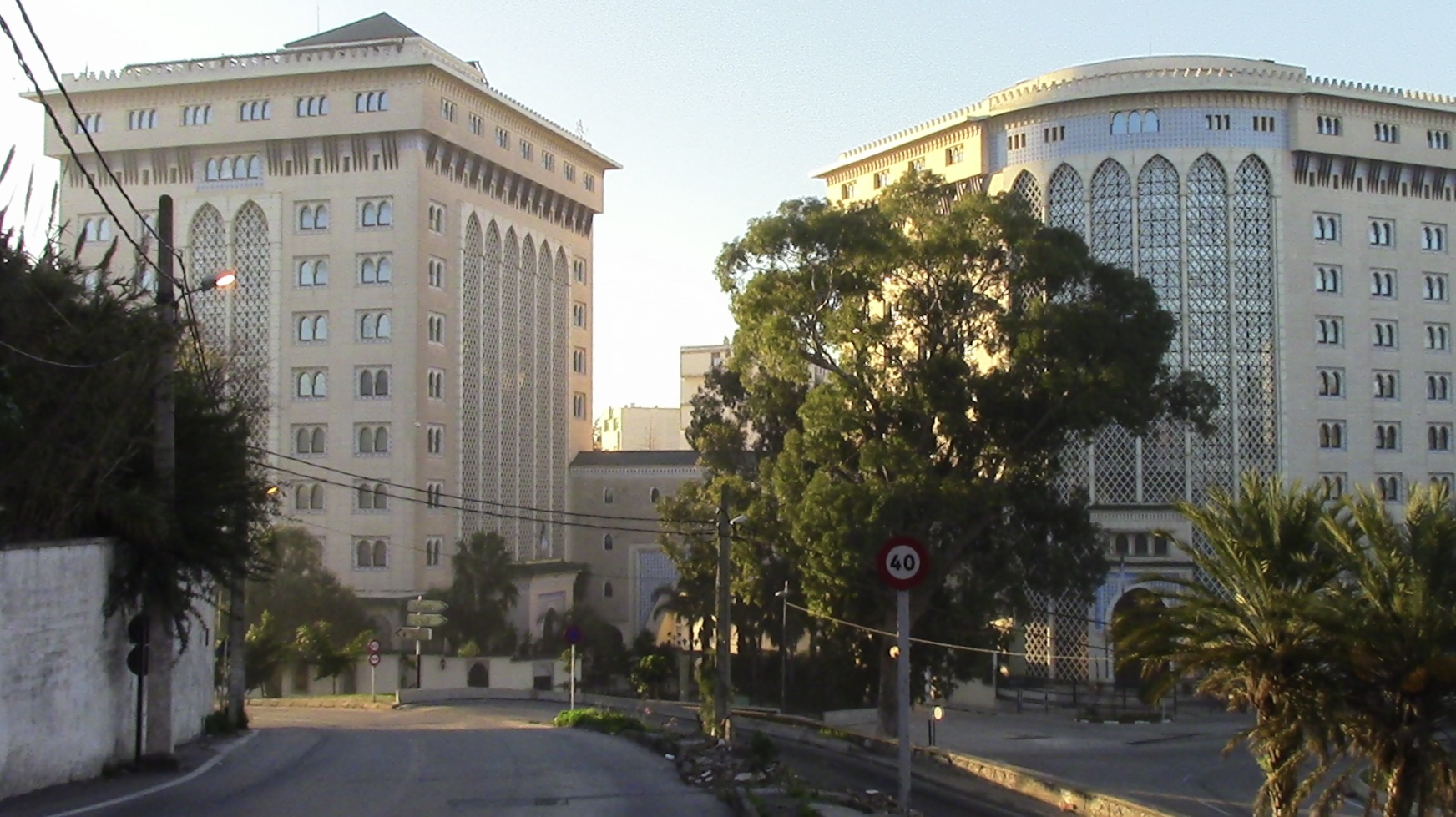
- Algerian Ministry of Energy Headquarter

Ministry overview
- Formed: April 23, 1977; 49 years ago
- Dissolved: September 15, 2025; 10 months ago
- Jurisdiction: Democratic People 's Republic of Algeria
- Headquarters: Algiers
- Ministry executive: Mohamed Arkab, Minister of Energy
- Website: www.energy.gov.dz/fr/

The Ministry of Energy and Mining (Arabic: وزارة الطاقة و المناجم, French: Ministère de l'Énergie et des Mines "Ministry of Energy and Mines") is a ministry of the government of Algeria. The head office is in Tour A in Algiers. As of 2021 Mohamed Arkab is the minister.

== History ==
The development of Algeria's energy sector post-independence has been marked by several regulatory and organizational changes designed to manage and exploit its energy resources effectively:

- 1962: Shortly after gaining independence, Algeria established the Energy and Fuels Directorate and the Algerian Petroleum Bureau to oversee the nation's energy sector.
- 1963: The creation of the Ministry of Industrialization and Energy, along with the national oil company Sonatrach, indicated an early focus on energy and mining as critical sectors.
- 1967-1969: The establishment of SONAREM and Sonelgaz highlighted further steps towards structuring the energy sector more robustly.
- 1971 and 1977: A series of reorganizations placed the energy sector under different ministries, reflecting the sector's increasing significance to the national economy.
- 1984-1991: The period saw the creation of distinct ministries for Mines and Industry and for Energy, signifying a more specialized approach to sector management.
- 1995: The government established a Ministry of Energy and Mines, consolidating the management of these key sectors under a single administrative body.
- 2007-2015: The Ministry of Energy and Mines was re-established and later streamlined into the Ministry of Energy, with several updates in its organizational structure to meet changing industry demands.

== List of ministers ==
Name	Start	End	Duration
Sid Ahmed Ghozali	23-Apr-77	8-Mar-79	1 year, 10 months, 13 days
Belkacem Nabi	8-Mar-79	10-Jun-05	9 years
Sadek Boussena	10-Jun-05	1989	1 year
Nordine Aït Laoussine	1991	1992	1 year
Hacène Mefti	1992	21-Aug-93	1 year
Ahmed Benbitour	21-Aug-93	11-Apr-94	7 months, 21 days
Amar Makhloufi	11-Apr-94	24-Jun-97	3 years, 2 months, 13 days
Youcef Yousfi	24-Jun-97	23-Dec-99	2 years, 5 months, 29 days
Chakib Khelil	23-Dec-99	28-May-10	10 years, 5 months, 5 days
Youcef Yousfi	28-May-10	14-May-15	4 years, 11 months, 16 days
Salah Khebri	14-May-15	11-Jun-16	1 year, 28 days
Noureddine Boutarfa	11-Jun-16	25-May-17	11 months, 14 days
Mustapha Guitouni	25-May-17	1-Apr-19	1 year, 10 months, 7 days
Mohamed Arkab	1-Apr-19	24-Jun-20	1 year, 2 months, 23 days
Abdelmadjid Attar	24-Jun-20	22-Feb-21	7 months, 29 days
Mohamed Arkab	22-Feb-21	Ongoing	

== See also ==
- Energy in Algeria
