= Ministry of Humanitarian Affairs and Disaster Management (Puntland) =

Government ministry in Puntland

- Wasaaradda Gargaarka iyo Maareynta Musiibooyinka وزارة الشؤون الإنسانية وإدارة الكوارث

Agency overview
- Jurisdiction: Government of Puntland
- Minister responsible: Ubah Abdirashid Mohamed
- Website: https://mohadm.pl.so/

The Ministry of Humanitarian Affairs and Disaster Management MoHADM (Somali: Wasaaradda Gargaarka iyo Maareynta Musiibooyinka) is a government agency of Puntland government for the preparation of emergencies and to coordinate disaster response, humanitarian operations and disaster management. The ministry is coordinating and directing humanitarian assistance, disaster risk reduction, disaster recovery, and resilience. It was ministered by Ubah Abdirashid Mohamed.
