= Ministry of Livestock and Animal Husbandry =

Government Ministry in Puntland

- Wasaaradda Xannaanada Xoolaha ee Dawladda Puntland وزارة الثروة الحيوانية وتربية الماشية

Agency overview
- Formed: 1 August 1998
- Jurisdiction: Government of Puntland
- Headquarters: Garowe, Puntland
- Minister responsible: Omar Abdisamad Yusuf Dhuuh
- Website: https://molah.pl.so/

The Puntland Ministry of Livestock and Animal Husbandry MoLAH (Somali: Wasaaradda Xannaanada Xoolaha ee Dawladda Puntland) is a government body responsible for overseeing livestock and animal husbandry, which are vital to Puntland’s economy and livelihoods. The ministry plays a key role in food security, economic growth, and sustainable agricultural development, contributing to the overall welfare of farmers and the livestock industry. It was established in 1998, with Hussein Ismail as its first minister, and the current minister is Omar Abdisamad Yusuf Dhuuh.

== Overview ==
The Ministry of Livestock and Animal Husbandry in Puntland implements policies, strategies, and improving livestock well-being, enhancing productivity, and promoting sustainable veterinary husbandry practices to strive and ensure economic growth and also improves food security and livelihoods across the region.

The ministry takes a central lead in supporting the region’s economy, as livestock is a major source of income and sustenance for many residents. The ministry promotes livestock exports, primarily to the Middle East, by ensuring quality and health standards are met. It also works on disease control initiatives, such as preventing Rift Valley Fever, to protect animal and public health. To address frequent droughts, the ministry implements resilience programs that provide water infrastructure and emergency feed supplies. Extension services offer training to farmers and pastoralists to adopt better breeding, nutrition, and care practices, while also supporting women and youth in livestock-related entrepreneurship. The ministry collaborates with international partners including FAO, NRC, ICRC, IGAD, WPF, Save the Children, and World Bank and formulates policies to regulate and sustainably develop the livestock sector in Puntland.

The Ministry also undertakes a range of projects that look at enhancing the productivity, health, and sustainability of the livestock sector. The projects focus on improving animal health through disease prevention and zoonotic disease control, increasing production through breeding, nutrition, and fodder development, and empowering farmers with training and resources.

The ministry also works on market development to improve infrastructure and access, while supporting resilience against drought and other downsides.
