= Abdelmalek Sellal =

Prime Minister of Algeria from 2014 to 2017

- عبد المالك سلال
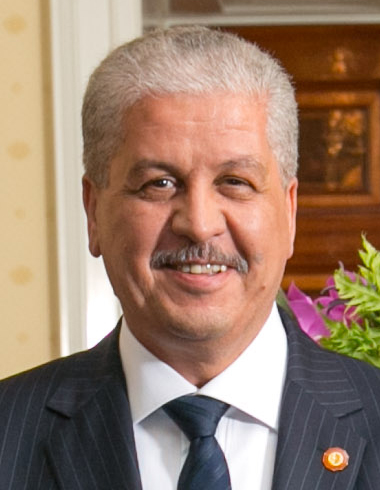
- Sellal in 2014

15th Prime Minister of Algeria
- In office 29 April 2014 – 25 May 2017
- President: Abdelaziz Bouteflika
- Preceded by: Youcef Yousfi (Acting)
- Succeeded by: Abdelmadjid Tebboune
- In office 3 September 2012 – 13 March 2014
- President: Abdelaziz Bouteflika
- Preceded by: Ahmed Ouyahia
- Succeeded by: Youcef Yousfi (Acting)

Personal details
- Born: 1 August 1948 (age 78) Constantine, Algeria
- Party: National Liberation Front (1968–present)
- Spouse: Farida Sellal
- Children: 3

Abdelmalek Sellal (Note: Arabic: عبد المالك سلال, romanized: ʿAbd al-Mālik Silāl) (born 1 August 1948) is an Algerian politician who was Prime Minister of Algeria from 3 September 2012 to 13 March 2014 when he took a leave of office to support President Abdelaziz Bouteflika's re-election campaign and again from April 2014 to May 2017.

== Life and career ==
Sellal was born on 1 August 1948 in Constantine, Algeria.

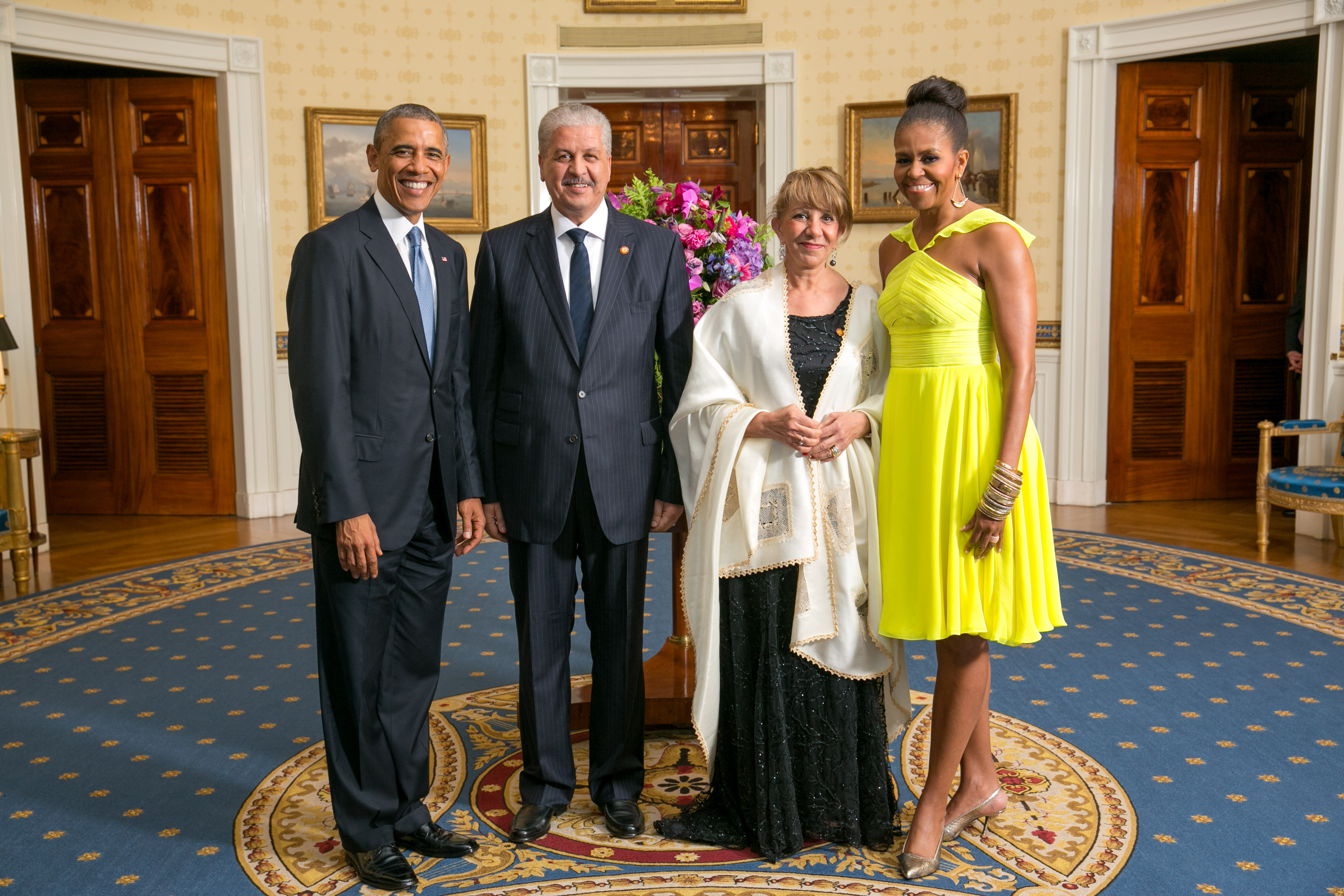
President Barack Obama and First Lady Michelle Obama greet Prime Minister Sellal and Farida Sellal in the Blue Room during a U.S.-Africa Leaders Summit dinner at the White House, 5 August 2014.

Sellal worked at the Ministry of Foreign Affairs from 1995 to 1996 and was posted in Budapest as Ambassador to Hungary from 1996 to 1997. Subsequently, he was appointed to the government, serving as Minister of the Interior from 1998 to 1999, Minister of Youth and Sports from 1999 to 2001, Minister of Public Works from 2001 to 2002, Minister of Transport from 2002 to 2004, and Minister of Water Resources from 2004 to 2012.

Sellal was appointed as prime minister by President Abdelaziz Bouteflika on 3 September 2012. Sellal is regarded as a technocrat and was involved in Bouteflika's presidential election campaigns in 2004 and 2009. He replaced Ahmed Ouyahia as prime minister.

Sellal stepped down in March 2014 in order to lead the re-election campaign of the ailing President Bouteflika. After Bouteflika's victory, he reappointed Sellal as prime minister on 28 April 2014.

In June 2019, Sellal was remanded in custody by the country's supreme court as part of an anti-corruption investigation.

In December 2019, he was sentenced to 15 years in jail.

In March 2020, an appeals court upheld his sentence.

== Notes ==
Political offices
Preceded by Ahmed Ouyahia	Prime Minister of Algeria; 2012–2014	Succeeded by Youcef Yousfi; Acting
Preceded by Youcef Yousfi; Acting	Prime Minister of Algeria; 2014–2017	Succeeded by Abdelmadjid Tebboune
