= Entreprise Tunisienne d'Activités Pétrolières =

Entreprise Tunisienne d'Activités Pétrolières (ETAP) المؤسسة التونسـية للأنشـطة البترولـية
- Company type: State-owned Corporation
- Industry: Hydrocarbons
- Founded: 10 March 1972
- Headquarters: Tunis, Tunisia Tunisia
- Key people: Taieb El Kamel (Chairman); Ben Abdallah (Minister of Industry)
- Products: Petroleum; Natural Gas; Exploration & Production; Crude oil Trading
- Services: Exploration and Production Services
- Net income: TD 1646,069 million (2018)
- Number of employees: 691 (2009)
- Subsidiaries: Joint Gas; Société nationale de distribution du pétrole Numhyd; Société tunisienne des lubrifiants
- Website: www.etap.com.tn

Entreprise Tunisienne d'Activités Pétrolières (ETAP) is a state-owned industrial and commercial company in Tunisia directly in charge of the petroleum sector as well as the state's partnerships with foreign exploration and production operators.

== Overview ==
ETAP was created by law N°72-22 on 10 March 1972, to manage petroleum exploration and production activities on behalf of the Tunisian government. ETAP is primarily active in endeavors related to attracting international oil companies to provide financing for exploration projects, particularly in the country's smaller oil fields. To help achieve this objective, Tunisia introduced a new hydrocarbon law (Law 99/93) that includes incentives with favorable fiscal regulations and additional legal flexibility of licensing procedures and terms. The new law has been effective since August 20, 2000. A provision for foreign corporations was a reduction in the tax rate from 75 to 50 percent, with ETAP taking a 40% share of the concession.

== Activities ==
As of 2007, ETAP has granted a total of 44 exploration licenses to 42 international and domestic companies. Additionally, ETAP has been working in Syria with German-based Preussag to develop small oil fields and has signed an oil cooperation agreement with Iraq. In December 2004, the Syrian and Tunisian governments signed exploration agreements for areas in northeastern Syria. ETAP also has joint ventures with Sonatrach of Algeria and Libya's National Oil Corporation (NOC). The 50-50 joint venture with NOC, known as the Tunisian-Libyan Gas Transportation Company (Joint Gas), is the client of the Trans-Med gas pipeline, which will supply natural gas from the Libyan town Melitah to Gabes in southeast Tunisia.

In April 2005, the Mabdallah Saad al-Thani Corporation of the United Arab Emirates announced a five-year exploration agreement with ETAP for the El Jem block, while U.S.-based Rigo Oil Company announced an exploration agreement for the Tozeur-Sud block. By the end of 2005, ETAP had issued 41 permits (26 onshore and 15 offshore), leading to an increase in total investment in petroleum exploration to US$135 million. In February 2006, Tunisia awarded PetroCanada and Anadarko a two-year production sharing agreements (PSAs) with ETAP for the Cape Sirat and Bashtar blocks.

In February 2006, a 35-year-old exploration dispute between Tunisia and Malta was resolved. The two countries signed a joint development agreement of the continental shelf between Malta and Tunisia, which is located near the Tunisian Isis field and Libya's offshore Bouri field. On March 20, 2007, Lundin Petroleum AB announced that ETAP decided to exercise its participation option to acquire a 20% interest in the Oudna field, offshore Tunisia. Following ETAP's participation, Lundin Petroleum and Atlantis Holding Norway AS will each hold 40%. The Oudna field development was successfully completed and production commenced in November 2006 and is now producing over 20,000 bbl/d (3,200 m^{3}/d). Average production for 2007 is estimated to be 14,000 bbl/d (2,200 m^{3}/d).
