= Constitution of Puntland =

Puntland's penal code and legal framework

Dastuurka Dawladda Puntland
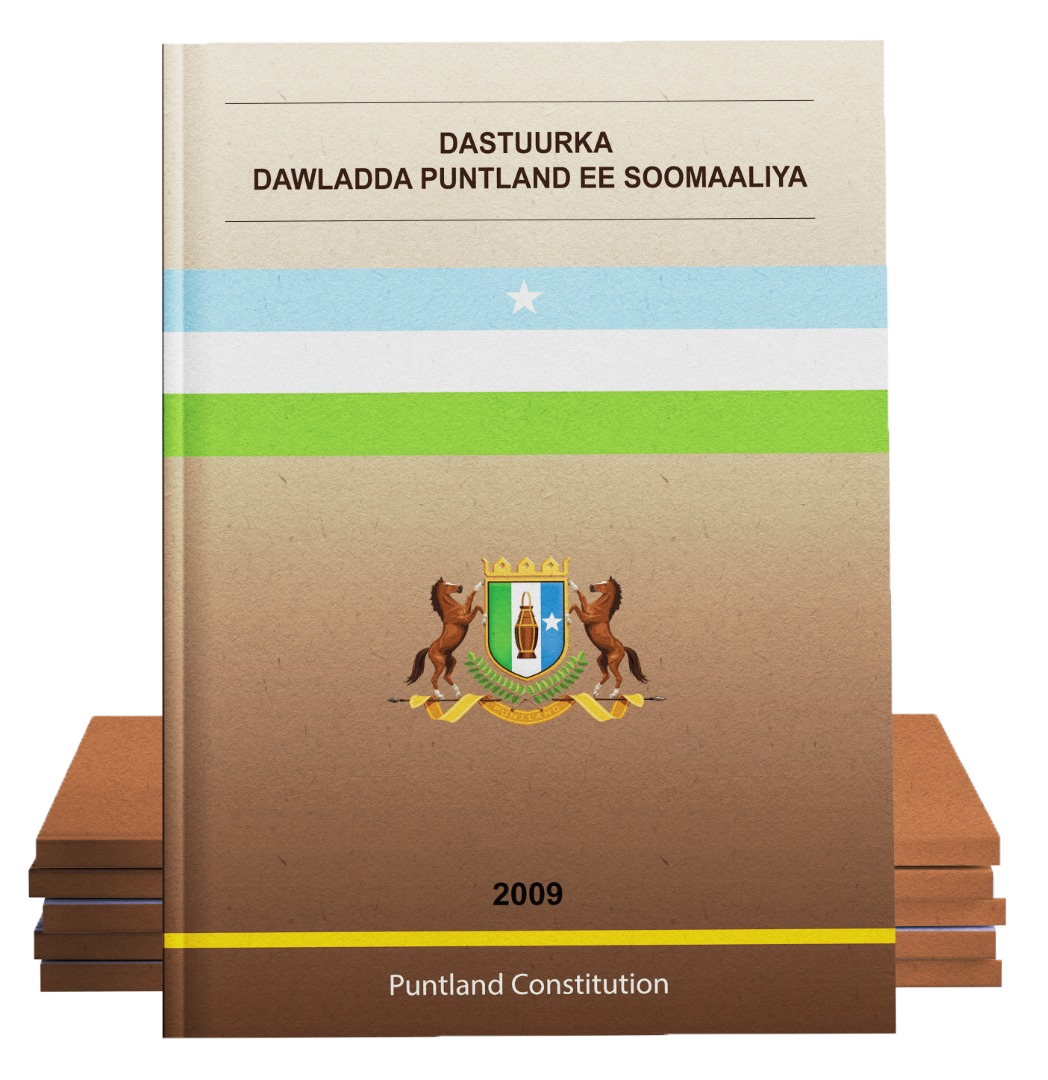

Overview
- Jurisdiction: Puntland
- Created: 15 May 1998; 28 years ago
- Presented: 6 May 2010; 16 years ago
- Ratified: 18 April 2012; 14 years ago
- Date effective: 4 March 2012; 14 years ago
- System: • presidential • parliamentary
- Head of state: Government of Puntland
- Judiciary: Supreme Court of Puntland
- Citation: puntlandparliament.com/wp-content/uploads/2022/08/Dastuuurka-Puntland-min.pdf
- Author: Abdirahman Farole
- Signatories: 472 delegates

The Constitution of Puntland is the governing document and legal framework for the autonomous Puntland region of Somalia. It is the supreme law documenting the duties, powers, structure and function of the government of Puntland, subject only to Somalia's federal constitution. The current constitution, adopted on the 18 April 2012, is Puntland state's first and only permanent constitution.

== Constitutions ==
=== 1998 Provisional Charter ===
Delegates representing various local clans began arriving in Garowe from early May 1998 for the opening of the constitutional conference on 15 May. Organisation of the “Shir Beeleed” (community conference), subsequently known as the “Shir-Beeleedka Dastuuriga ah ee Garowe” (Garowe Community Constitutional Conference), included the registration and accommodation of delegates, undertaken by a preparatory committee which organised the whole conference process and drafted the charter with the help of a group of international constitutional lawyers. Over 460 delegates representing the different sub-clans and social strata participated. A provisional Charter was adopted in July and a president and vice-president were elected, marking the establishment of the Puntland State of Somalia.

=== 2001 Constitution ===
A transitional constitution was adopted by the House of Representatives of Puntland on 05/06/2011. In conformity with Article 28, a constitutional commission was established and a new constitution proposed. The transitional constitution made way for an anticipated federal Somalia.

The constitution was based on the following provisions:

- Islamic Sharia
- The system of idea sharing and collective decision making
- The proportionality of Government powers; Executive, Legislative and Judiciary
- Decentralization of governmental power
- A multi-party system
- Ensuring the existence of private ownership and the free market
- Ensuring the individual fundamental rights and life, security and general stability.

== Provisions of the current Puntland constitution ==
The current Puntland constitution was adopted on 18 April 2012. Out of 480 representatives, 472 representatives voted to approve the draft constitution.

=== Title I: "The Puntland State And Its Founding Principles" ===
- Article 1 - Name and purpose
- Article 2 - Supremacy of the law
- Article 3 - System of government
- Article 4 - The people
- Article 5 - The census
- Article 6 - Land and boundaries
- Article 7 - Language
- Article 8 - Religion
- Article 9 - Capital City
- Article 10 - Flag, symbol and anthem

=== Title II: "The Fundamental Rights And Guarantees Of The Person" ===
- Chapter 1 - Individual rights and their suspension
  - Section 1 - Individual Rights
  - Section 2 - State of Exception of Individual Liberties
- Chapter 2 - Social Rights
  - Section 1 - The Family
- Chapter 3 - Citizenship and Electoral Procedures

=== Title III: "Economy" ===
    - Article 46 - The economic order purpose
    - Article 47 - Socio-economic system of a free enterprise
    - Article 48 - Natural Resources
    - Article 49 - Protection of the environment
    - Article 50 - The role of the state in the economy
    - Article 51 - Joint ventures companies
    - Article 52 - Transaction of public property
    - Article 53 - Nationalisation of private property

=== Title IV: "The Structure Of The Government" ===
- Chapter 1 - The Fundamental Organs of the State
    - Article 54 - Parliamentary regime
    - Article 55 - The three organs of the state
    - Article 56 - Separation of organs
    - Article 57 - Cooperation of organs
- Chapter 2 - The Legislature
  - Section 1 - The House of Representatives
  - Section 2 - The Process of Law Formation
- Chapter 3 - The Executive
- Chapter 4 - The Judiciary
- Chapter 5 - Other Fundamental Institutions of the State
  - Section 1 - The Office of the Attorney General
  - Section 2 - The Office for the Defence and Promotion of Human Rights
  - Section 3 - The Auditor General
  - Section 4 - Electoral Authority
- Chapter 6 - Regional and District Administration
  - Section 1 - Regional Administration
  - Section 2 - District Administrations

=== Title V: "The Administrative Government Of Puntland" ===
- Chapter 1 - The Civil Service
- Chapter 2 - Public Finances

=== Title VI: "Supremacy And Reform Of The Constitution" ===
- Article 133 - Pre-eminence of the constitution
- Article 134 - Constitutional reforms
- Article 135 - Harmonization of this constitution with federal constitution
- Article 136 - Enforcement of the constitution
