= Mohamed Arkab =

Algerian politician and minister

- محمد عرقاب
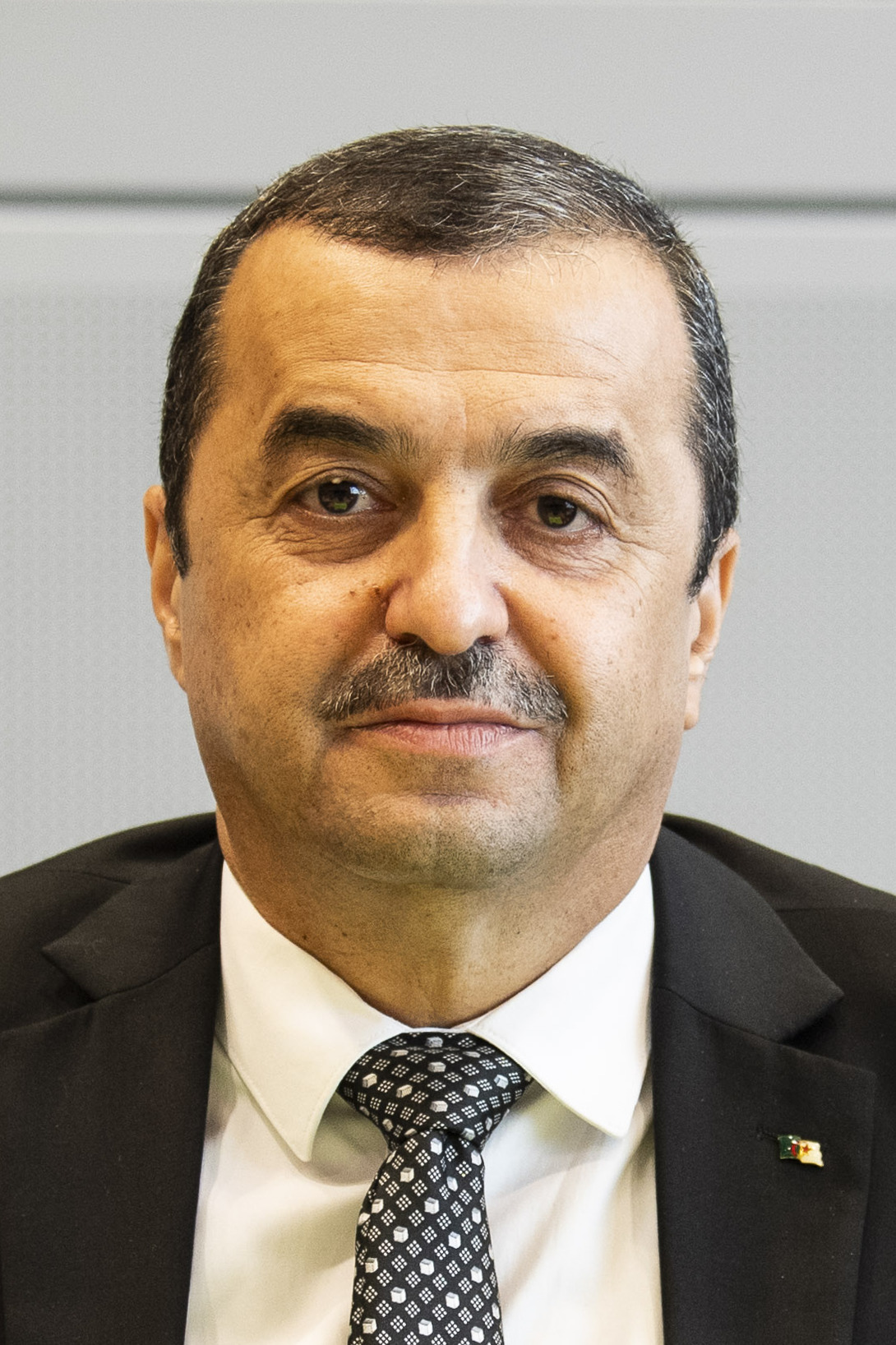
- Arkab in 2023

Minister of Energy
- Incumbent
- Assumed office 22 February 2021
- President: Abdelmadjid Tebboune
- Prime Minister: Aymen Benabderrahmane; Nadir Larbaoui
- Preceded by: Abdelmadjid Attar

Minister of Mining
- In office 1 April 2019 – 22 February 2021
- Preceded by: Mustapha Guitouni

Director general of Sonelgaz
- In office 30 August 2017 – 1 April 2019
- Preceded by: Mustapha Guitouni
- Succeeded by: Chahar Boulakhras

Personal details
- Born: 19 February 1966 (age 60) Hussein Dey, Algeria
- Party: Independent
- Education: University of Science and Technology Houari Boumediene
- Occupation: Chief executive officer; Director general; Minister
- Profession: Mechanical engineer; Politician

Mohamed Arkab (born 19 February 1966) is an Algerian politician who is serving as Minister of Energy since 22 February 2021.

== Biography ==
Arkab was born in 1966 in the municipality of Hussein Dey in Algiers.

After studying in Algeria, he obtained a diploma in mechanical engineering at the University of Science and Technology Houari Boumediene. He also began studies to obtain a master's degree in business administration MBA in a cycle of business management.

He then joined Sonelgaz in 1990 where he spent his entire professional career, and where he was notably responsible for the Compagnie de l'Engineering de l'Electricité et du Gaz CEEG-Spa.

Arkab was appointed as chairman of the company Sonelgaz from 30 August 2017 until he took office as Minister of Energy on 1 April 2019.

He announced in May 2019 that he was opposed to the takeover of the assets of the American company Anadarko Petroleum in Algeria by the French company Total SE.

Arkab took up his new functions at the head of the Ministry of Energy and Mining on 22 February 2021.

== Functions ==
The summary of Arkab's professional career includes the following:

- from 21 February 2021: Minister of Energy and Mines.
- 2020 – 2021: Minister of Mines.
- 2019 – 2020: Minister of Energy.
- 2017 – 2019: Chief executive officer (CEO) of Sonelgaz.
- 2010 – 2017: CEO of CEEG, subsidiary of Sonelgaz.
- 2006 – 2010: CEO of Etterkib, a subsidiary of Sonelgaz.

== See also ==
- University of Science and Technology Houari Boumediene
- Sonelgaz
- Ministry of Energy and Mining
