= Ministry of Labour and Social Affairs (Puntland) =

Government Ministry in Puntland

- Wasaaradda Shaqada iyo Arrimaha Bulshada وزارة العمل والشؤون الاجتماعية

Agency overview
- Jurisdiction: Government of Puntland
- Headquarters: Garowe, Puntland
- Minister responsible: Abdirahman Sheikh Ahmed Habarwaa
- Website: https://molsa.pl.so/

The Ministry of Labour and Social Affairs MoLSA (Somali: Wasaaradda Shaqada iyo Arrimaha Bulshada) is a ministry of Puntland government responsible for implementing employment, training, and social security. As well as social work, social protection and assistance, pensions, welfare, and health insurance. Headquarters in Puntland's capital Garowe. It was ministered by Abdirahman Sheikh Ahmed Habarwaa.
