= Supreme Court of Puntland =

Highest Court of Puntland

The Supreme Court of Puntland
- Maxkamadda Sare ee Puntland
- Interactive map of The Supreme Court of Puntland
- 8.4111°N 48.4752°E
- Established: 2022
- Jurisdiction: Government of Puntland
- Location: Garowe
- Coordinates: 8.4111°N 48.4752°E
- Composition method: Judiciary
- Authorised by: Constitution of Puntland

Xeer Ilaaliye
- Currently: Ahmed Mohamed Yusuf
- Since: 30 March 2022

The Supreme Court of Puntland was established under Presidential Decree Lr. 21 of 30 March 2022, as part of the Puntland Government's structure which includes the judiciary, legislative (House of Representatives), and the executive (the President, vice president and his nominated council of Ministries). The judiciary, including the Supreme Court, plays a crucial role in the legal structure of Puntland, ensuring the administration of justice and adherence to the Puntland Constitution.

The Chief Executive of Puntland Supreme Court is Ahmed Mohamed Yusuf, who was appointed in March 2022.
