= Ministry of Information, Technology and Tourism (Puntland) =

Government ministry in Puntland

- Wasaaradda Warfaafinta, Isgaarsiinta, Hiddaha iyo Dalxiiska وزارة المعلومات والاتصالات والتكنولوجيا والسياحة

Agency overview
- Formed: 1 August 1998
- Jurisdiction: Government of Puntland
- Headquarters: Garowe, Puntland
- Minister responsible: Mohamoud Aidid Dirir
- Website: https://moitt.pl.so/

The Puntland Ministry of Information, Technology and Tourism MoITT (Somali: Wasaaradda Warfaafinta, Isgaarsiinta, Hiddaha iyo Dalxiiska) is the government body responsible for managing and setting policies and laws related to media, postal services, telecommunications, tourism, culture and heritage. It was established in 1998. The first minister was Awad Ahmed Ashara, and the Incumbent minister is Mohamoud Aidid Dirir.
