= Ministry of Youth and Sports (Puntland) =

Government Ministry in Puntland

- Wasaaradda Shaqaallaha, Dhallinyaradda iyo Ciyaaraha وزارة العمال والشباب والرياضة

Agency overview
- Formed: 25 August 1998
- Jurisdiction: Government of Puntland
- Headquarters: Garowe, Puntland
- Minister responsible: Hodan Said Hassan
- Website: https://molys.pl.so/

The Puntland Ministry of Labours, Youth, and Sports MoLYS (Somali: Wasaaradda Shaqada, Shaqaallaha, Dhallinyaradda iyo Ciyaaraha ee Dawladda Puntland) is a government ministry responsible for regulating and organizing sports events for young people, as well as overseeing labour laws. Its mandate includes setting labour standards, managing labour dispute mechanisms and establishing employment conditions for both civil and non-civil workers. The ministry is also developing, coordinating, and implementing state policies on labour, professional qualifications, income and living standards, industrial relations, workplace health and safety, social security, and social assistance. Additionally, it is responsible for implementing policies and laws related to youth and sports development. The ministry was led by Hodan Said.
