= Ministry of Commerce, Industry, and Investment (Puntland) =

Puntland government Ministry of Environment and Climate Change

- Wasaaradda Ganacsiga, Warshadaha iyo Maalgashiga وزارة التجارة والصناعة والاستثمار

Agency overview
- Formed: 1 August 1998
- Jurisdiction: Government of Puntland
- Headquarters: Garowe, Puntland
- Minister responsible: Ahmed Shire Said
- Website: https://www.mocii.pl.so/

The Puntland Ministry of Commerce, Industry, and Investment MoCII (Somali: Wasaaradda Ganacsiga, Warshadaha iyo Maalgashiga) is a government body of the Government of Puntland. The Ministry is responsible for commerce, industry and investment all across the nine regions of Puntland, along with playing an integral role in the state's Cabinet. It was established in 1998 and first minister was Ali Ismail 'Abdi Giir', current minister is Ahmed Shire Said.
