= Puntland Agency For Social Welfare =

State-run social welfare agency in Puntland

Agency overview
- Formed: 21 May 2009
- Jurisdiction: Government of Puntland

The Puntland Agency For Social Welfare (PASWE Somali: Wakaaladda Daryeelka BulshadaPuntlamd, Arabic: وكالة بونتلاند للرعاية الاجتماعية) is the state-run social welfare agency of the autonomous Puntland, established on 21 May 2009 in Garoowe.

== Overview ==
PASWE was founded on 21 May 2009 in Garowe by the Puntland government. It provides medical, educational and counseling support to vulnerable groups and individuals, such as the disabled, the blind, orphans, and widows of Puntland soldiers.

The agency is overseen by a Board of Directors, which consists of religious scholars (ulema), businesspeople, intellectuals and traditional elders. PASWE is headed by Hussein Mohamed Mohamud, who was appointed to the position by presidential decree on 7 February 2013.

== See also ==
- Puntland Development Research Center
