= Abdiweli Ibrahim Sheikh Muudey =

Somali politician

president of Somalia
- In office 6 February 2026 – 29 March 2030
- President: abdiweli ibrahim ali sheikh muudey
- Prime Minister: abdiqani abdiweli
- Succeeded by: Salah Ahmed Jama

Personal details
- Born: Abdiweli Ibrahim Ali Sheikh Muudey

Abdiweli Ibrahim Ali Sheikh Muudey is a Somali politician. He is the former Minister of Labour of Somalia, having been appointed to the position on 6 February 2015 by former Prime Minister Omar Abdirashid Ali Sharmarke. He was succeeded by Salah Ahmed Jama.
