= Sonelgaz =

Algerian electricity and gas utility

Sonelgaz سونلغاز
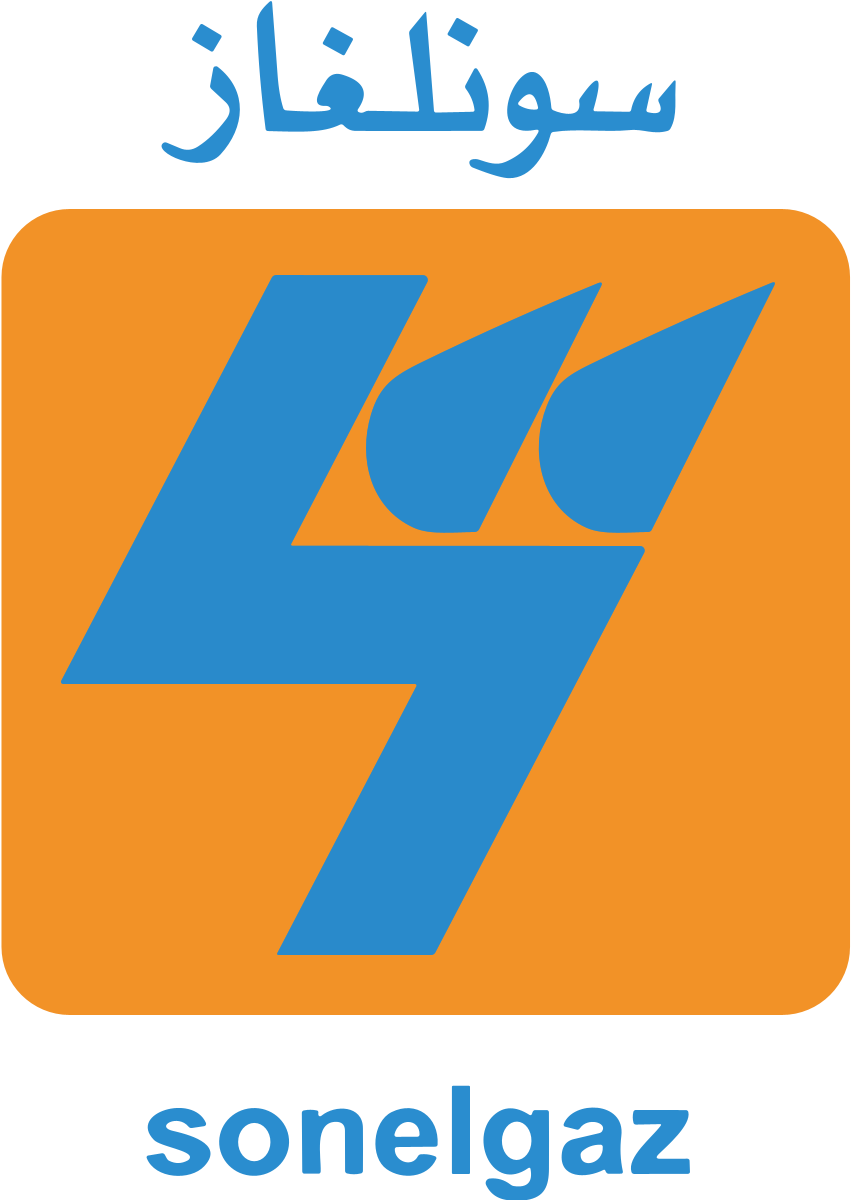

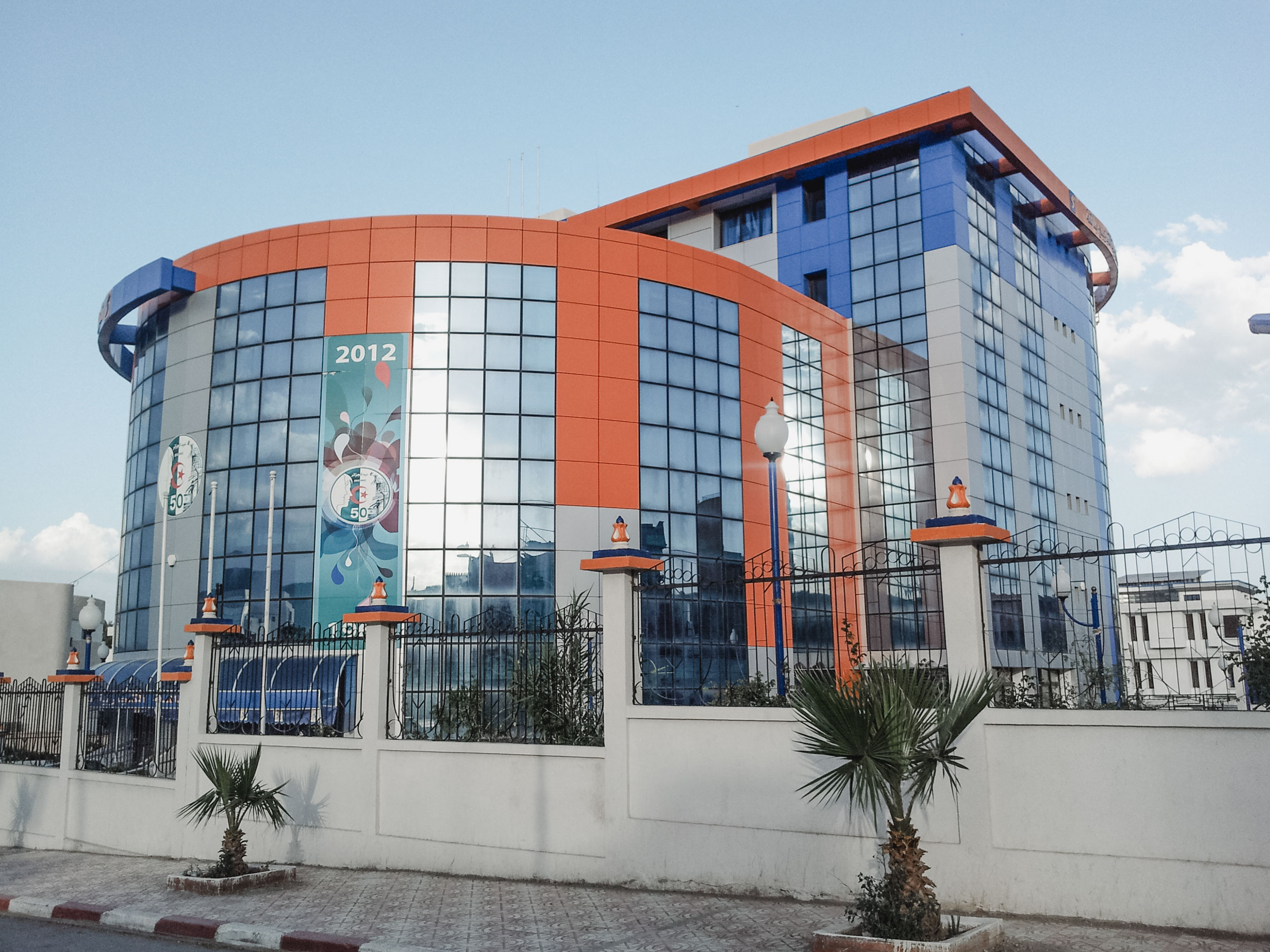
- Type: Société Anonyme
- Industry: Electric utility, Natural gas
- Founded: 28 July 1969
- Headquarters: Algiers, Algeria
- Area served: Algeria
- Key people: Mourad Adjal (CEO)
- Products: Electricity generation, transmission and distribution; energy trading, Natural gas sale and distribution
- Owner: Algerian Government
- Website: Official website

Sonelgaz (Arabic: سونلغاز, Société Nationale de l'Electricité et du Gaz, National Company for Electricity and Gas) is a state-owned utility in charge of electricity and natural gas distribution in Algeria. It was established in 1969, replacing the previous body Electricité et gaz d'Algérie (EGA), and was given a monopoly over the distribution and selling of natural gas within the country as well as the production, distribution, importation, and exportation of electricity. In 2002, its monopoly was revoked by presidential decree N° 02-195, which legally converted it into a private (though entirely government-owned) company; it is now scheduled to be split eventually. As of 2003, it produces 29 billion kWh a year, sells 4.6 billion cubic metres of gas a year, and employs nearly 20,000 people.

== Chief executive officers ==
- Mohamed Arkab (2017–2019)
- Chahar Boulakhras (2019–2021)
- Mourad Adjal (2021–)

• Abdelkrim Benghanem (1995–2003)
