= Jade (sea lion) =

New Zealand sea lion (2016–2024)

- Species: New Zealand sea lion (Phocarctos hookeri)
- Sex: Female
- Born: 2016; Kaka Point, Otago
- Died: 2024

Jade (2016–2024) was a New Zealand sea lion. She gathered media attention in February 2024 after swimming 60 kilometres up the Clutha River, which was not an expected behaviour for a sea lion. In September 2024 she and her pup were shot and killed.

== Life ==
Jade was born under a crib in 2016 at Kaka Point, Otago, the first pup of a sea lion named Matariki. She was later given the name "Jade," which was the name of the crib owners' late son. In January 2024, it was discovered that she had swum 60 kilometres up the Clutha River while pregnant, to a property near Tuapeka. While it is known that pregnant female sea lions tend to travel inland to escape males, ranger Jim Fyfe described it as "unexpected" and "exciting" to see her travel this far. Satellite tracking done in 2019 and 2022 did not find any sea lions in the Clutha River. Jade gave birth in that spot. The pup had a weight of 15 kilograms, and was female.

In September 2024, the pup was discovered in distress after being shot at least 25 times with a shotgun, and soon died. The Department of Conservation (DOC) described it as "atrocious". It took until 2006 for sea lions to begin breeding again in the Catlins, with 45 pups being born there by 2024 (including some who died). Sea lions are a protected species under the Wildlife Act 1953, with the maximum punishment for killing one being a $250,000 fine and/or a two-year prison sentence. DOC set up a hotline to gather information about its death, and the Sea Lion Trust offered a $5,000 reward for anyone who could provide information that would lead to prosecution.

A few weeks later in October, Jade's decomposing body had been discovered dead about 100 metres away from where her pup had been discovered, after being shot with a shotgun. About 50 shot gun pellets had been discovered in her, and they will be forensically compared to the pellets discovered in the pup. It is believed that her body had washed up to that spot after the October floods. There are only 12 breeding females in the area. The Sea Lion Trust increased its reward to $6,000, and about a week later, increased it again to $11,000. In December officials determined that Jade had not been shot, but did not rule out being stabbed or another act of violence.

Some people were uncomfortable being near the sea lions when they were alive.

== See also ==
- Mum (sea lion), a sea lion who spent time in Otago
