= Ministry of Agriculture and Irrigation (Puntland) =

Government Ministry in Puntland

- Wasaaradda Beeraha iyo Waraabka ee Dawladda Puntland وزارة الزراعة والري في حكومة بونتلاند

Agency overview
- Formed: 1 August 1998
- Jurisdiction: Government of Puntland
- Headquarters: Garowe, Puntland
- Minister responsible: Mohamed Abdiqadir Salah 'Donyale'
- Website: https://moai.pl.so/

The Ministry of Agriculture and Irrigation MoLI (Somali: Wasaaradda Hawlaha Guud, Gaadiidka iyo Guryaynta) is the government body in the Puntland Government responsible for agriculture and irrigation. It was one of the first ministries established in 1998 in Garowe, the capital city of Puntland. The current minister is Mohamed Abdiqadir Salah 'Donyale'.
