= Government of Puntland =

Somali sub-national government

Puntland Government
- Dowladda Buntilaan (Somali) حكومة أرض بنط (Arabic)
- Coat of arms
- Formation: August 1, 1998; 27 years ago
- Founding document: Constitution of Puntland
- Jurisdiction: Puntland
- Website: plstate.so

Legislative branch
- Legislature: House of Representatives (Gollaha Wakiilada)

Executive branch
- Leader: President
- Main organ: Executive Council

Judicial branch
- Court: Supreme Court (Maxkamadda Sare)
- Seat: Garoowe

The Government of Puntland (Somali: Dowladda Buntilaan; Arabic: حكومة أرض بنط) is the supreme governing authority of the semi-autonomous state of Puntland. The legal structure of Puntland consists of the judiciary (Supreme Court), legislative (House of Representatives) and the executive (the President, Vice president and his nominated council of Ministries) branches of government. Puntland has conducted seven presidential elections (1998, 2001, 2005, 2009, 2014, 2019, 2024). Five Presidents are elected by a 66-member unicameral parliament. Since 1998, the governing bodies have been located in the administrative capital of Garowe.

== Establishment ==
Following the outbreak of the civil war in 1991, a homegrown constitutional conference was held in Garowe in 1998 over a period of three months. Attended by the area's political elite, traditional elders (Issims), members of the business community, intellectuals and other civil society representatives, the autonomous Puntland State of Somalia was subsequently officially established so as to deliver services to the population, offer security, facilitate trade, and interact with both domestic and international partners.

== Competencies ==
Since 31 March 2024, following changes due to the constitutional crisis in Somalia, the government of Puntland no longer recognizes the authority of the Somali federal government and would no longer participate in Somali federal institutions. It has declared that it will "act independently", or "exercise powers of an independent state", until there is a federal government with a constitution agreed upon in a referendum in which Puntland participates.

== Government agencies ==
- Puntland Agency for Social Welfare (PASWE)
- Puntland Highway Authority (PHA)
- Puntland State Agency for Water, Energy and Natural Resources (PSAWEN)
- Puntland Petroleum and Mineral Agency (PPMA)
- Information Management Center (IMC-Puntland)
- State Bank of Puntland (SBP)

== Government ministries ==
- Ministry of Agriculture and Irrigation
- Ministry of Civil Aviation and Airport Authority
- Ministry of Commerce, Industry, and Investment
- Ministry of Education and Higher Education
- Ministry of Environment, Range and Climate Change
- Ministry of Finance
- Ministry of Fisheries and Marine Resources
- Ministry of Health
- Ministry of Humanitarian Affairs and Disaster Management
- Ministry of Information, Technology and Tourism
- Ministry of Interior, Federal Affairs and Democratization
- Ministry of Justice and Religious Affairs
- Ministry of Labour and Social Affairs
- Ministry of Livestock and Animal Husbandry
- Ministry of Sea Transport, Ports and Maritime Crime Prevention
- Ministry of Energy, Mineral and Water
- Ministry of Public Works, Housing and Transport
- Ministry of Planning Economic Development and International Cooperation
- Ministry of Security
- Ministry of Women Development and Family Affairs
- Ministry of Youth and Sports

== Cabinet ==
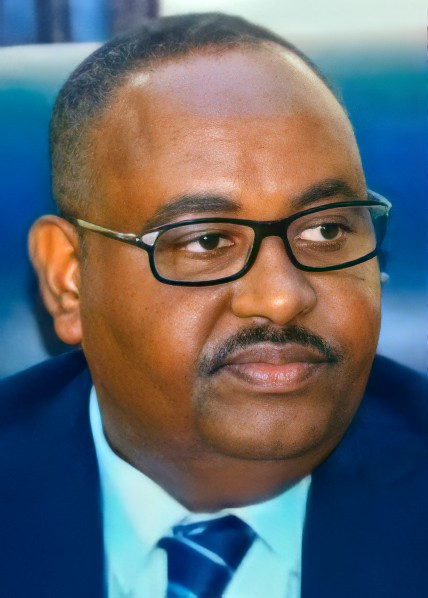
Position	Name
President	Said Abdullahi Dani
Vice President	Ahmed Elmi Osman
Minister for the Interior and Local Governments	Ahmed Elmi Osman
Minister of Security	Hassan Osman Mahamud Aloore
Minister for Finance	Shire Haji Farah
Minister for Justice	Ismail Mohamed Warsame
Minister of Constitution, Federalism and Democracy	Sahro Said Nur
Minister of Planning and International Relations	Ali Ahmed Faatah
Minister of Animal Husbandry	Abdullahi Du'ale Ali
Minister of Education	Ali Haji Warsame
Minister of Health	Sadiq Enow
Minister of Public Works	Abdirashid Mohamed Hersi
Minister of Civil Aviation and Airport Authority	Hassan Haji Said Hassan
Minister of Agriculture and Irrigation	Abdi Ismail Boos
Minister of Fisheries and Sea Resources	Abdinur Elmi Mohamud
Minister of Seaports and Sea Transportation	Abdullahi Jamac Salah
Minister of Labourers and Youth	Abdurahman Sheikh Ahmed Abdulle
Minister of Women's Affairs	Anisa Hajimumin
Minister of Environmental Protection, Wild Animals and Tourism	Guled Salah Barre
Minister of Trade and Industry	Mohamed Hassan Soo-Adde
