= Islam in Puntland =

Religion in Puntland

The main religion of Puntland is Islam. All the inhabitants of the region are Sunni Muslims. Puntland's state constitution states that "Islam shall be the only religion of Puntland State of Somalia. No any other religion can be propagated in Puntland State, while the Islamic Religion and the traditions of the people of Puntland are the bases of law."

Muslims in Puntland are not allowed to renounce their religion.

The constitution of Puntland restricts the formation of political parties based on a particular faith, religious beliefs, or interpretations of religious doctrine: “Our decision that to use Islamic law will be different from the type of militant Islam in Mogadishu,[...] we do not want to politicize the Islamic religion.”

In 2026, Puntland became a bastion of Jihadists from the Islamic State (IS) who were pushed back from Iraq and Syria. Puntland's authorities launched an offensive to chase them away from villages.
