= Ministry of Electricity =

A ministry of electricity is a government department responsible for electricity, including:

- Ministry of Electricity and Renewable Energy (Egypt)
- Ministry of Electricity (Iraq)
- Ministry of Electricity and Energy (Myanmar)
- Ministry of Electricity and Dams (South Sudan)
- Ministry of Electricity (Syria)
