= Ministry of Energy, Mineral and Water =

Government ministry in Puntland

- Wasaaradda Tamarta, Macdanta iyo Biyaha ee Puntland وزارة الطاقة والمياه المعدنية في بونتلاند

Ministry overview
- Formed: 19 March 2019
- Jurisdiction: Government of Puntland
- Minister responsible: Liban Muse Boqor
- Website: https://moemw.pl.so/

The Ministry of Energy, Mineral and Water MoEMW (Somali: Wasaaradda Tamarta, Macdanta iyo Biyaha) is government agency of the Government of Puntland, established on 19 March 2019, headquartered in Puntland's capital, Garowe, responsible for the state's water, energy, and minerals to serve Puntland's socio-economic development. Since 2024, it has been ministered by Liban Muse Boqor.
