= Ministry of Mines and Energy (Togo) =

Government ministry of Togo

The Ministry of Mines and Energy (French: Ministère des Mines et de l'Énergie du Togo) is a ministry of the government of Togo. The head office is in Lomé. As of 2013 Dammipi Noupokou is the minister.
