= Ministry of Mines and Energy =

The Ministry of Mines and Energy is a top-level government entity in several countries, responsible for the oversight of mining and energy production and consumption. The following articles cover individual Ministries of Mines and Energy:

- Ministry of Energy and Mining (Algeria)
- Ministry of Mines and Energy (Brazil)
- Burundi Ministry of Energy and Mines
- Ministry of Mines and Energy (Cambodia)
- Ministry of Energy, Mines and Resources, of Canada
  - Ministry of Energy and Mines (Ontario), Canada
- Ministry of Mines and Energy (Colombia)
- Ministry of Energy and Mines (Peru)
- Ministry of Mines and Energy (Togo)
