= Sonatrach =

Oil and gas company of Algeria

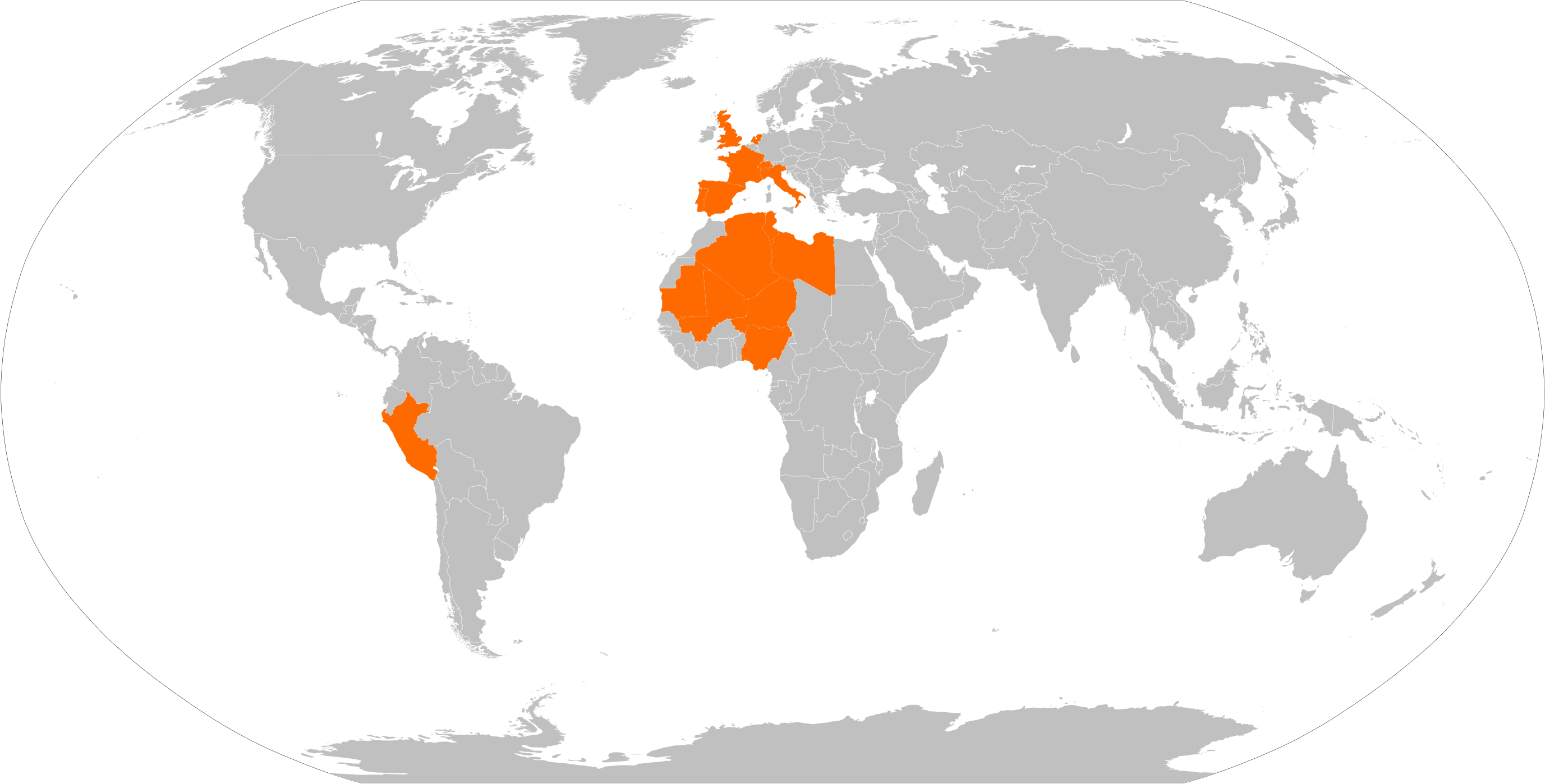
- International operations of Sonatrach
- Type: Government-owned corporation
- Industry: Oil and gas
- Founded: December 1963; 62 years ago
- Headquarters: Hydra, Algiers, Algeria
- Key people: Rachid Hachichi (CEO)
- Products: Petroleum (fuels, lubricants); Natural gas (LNG); Petrochemicals
- Revenue: US$ 77 billion (2023)
- Owner: Algerian government
- Number of employees: +200,000 (2022)
- Subsidiaries: Naftal; Numhyd; ALEPCO; ENAGEO; ENSP; ENGTP; ENAFOR; GALSI; GCB; ENTP National Well Engineering Company; Tassili Travail Aérien
- Website: sonatrach.com

Sonatrach (Note: An acronym of Société nationale pour la recherche, la production, le transport, la transformation, et la commercialisation des hydrocarbures, literally "National Company for the Research, Production, Transport, Processing, and Marketing of Hydrocarbons") (French pronunciation: [so.na.tʁak]; Arabic: سوناطراك) is the national state-owned oil company of Algeria. Founded in 1963, it is known today to be the largest company in Africa with 154 subsidiaries, and often referred as the first African oil "major". In 2021, Sonatrach was the seventh largest gas company in the world.

== Overview ==
Sonatrach is the 12th largest oil consortium in the world, with 154 subsidiaries operating over the entire oil value-chain from upstream, to midstream, and downstream activities.

In 2002, its gross sales was 1,530 billion Algerian dinars for a net income of 175 billion. With approximately 120,000 workers, the company produced 30% of the GNP of Algeria. Annually it produced 206 million Tonne of Oil equivalent (ToE), including 24 million ToE, or 11.7% of total, for the Algerian domestic market. In 2021, the company's export revenues had increased by 75%, placing turnovers at US$35bn for the year compared to the US$20bn from the previous year. Vice-president, Rachid Zerdani, stated that the results can be explained by the "recovery of global economic activity in 2021". Production increased to 185 million ToE, resulting in export levels of 95 million ToE. Sonatrach employed over 53,000 employees, as well as more than 150,000 employed in its subsidiaries.

Sonatrach operates the largest oil field in Algeria, Hassi Messaoud, which produced around 440,000 bbl/d (70,000 m^{3}/d) of crude in 2006. Sonatrach also operates the Hassi R'Mel field (north of Hassi Messaoud, south of Algiers), which produces around 180,000 bbl/d (29,000 m^{3}/d) of crude. Other major fields operated by Sonatrach include Tin Fouye Tabankort Ordo, Zarzaitine, Haoud Berkaoui/Ben Kahla, and Ait Kheir.

Sonatrach operates over 3,900 km (2,400 mi) of crude oil pipelines in the country. The most important pipelines carry crude oil from the Hassi Messaoud field to export terminals. Sonatrach also operates oil condensate and LPG pipeline networks that link Hassi R'mel and other fields to Arzew. Sonatrach is expanding the Hassi Messaoud-Azrew pipeline, the longest in the country. The project entails a second, parallel line that will more than double the capacity of the existing line.

Sonatrach has some concessions in Libya, Mauritania, Peru, Yemen and Venezuela. The company has also diversified into petrochemistry and the desalination of seawater.

=== Selected fields ===
Field	Annual production
Hassi Messaoud field	440,000 bbl/d (70,000 m^{3}/d)
Hassi R'Mel gas field	180,000 bbl/d (29,000 m^{3}/d)
Zarzautine field	
Ait Kheir	
Haoud Berkaoui/Ben Kahla	
Tin Fouye Tabankort Ordo	

Notes: 1.EIA 2007.

== History ==
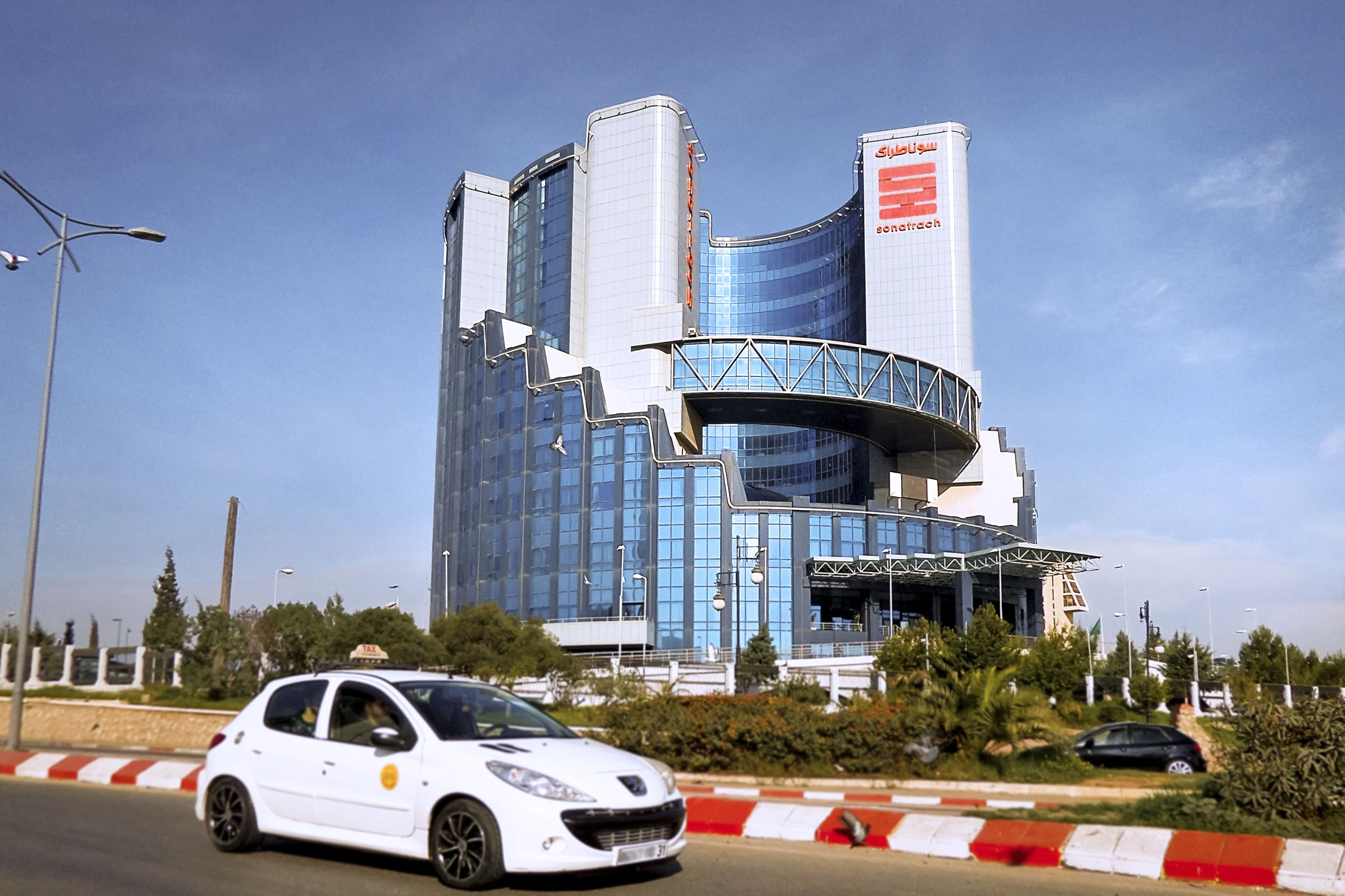
Sonatrach offices in Oran

Sonatrach was founded on December 31, 1963. At the time, however, the Algerian state held only 4.5% of the exploration perimeters, while French interests were as high as 67.5%.

After the Arab-Israeli War in June 1967, Algeria decided to nationalize the refining and distribution activities of Mobil and Esso, and Sonatrach signed an agreement with Getty Oil on October 19, 1968 receiving 51% of Getty Oil's interests.

Sonatrach gained control over all Algerian petrochemical resources following President Houari Boumedienne's nationalisation of all French oil and gas holdings beginning on February 24, 1971. The old concession system was replaced by a seizure of a 51% share of French petroleum companies. Only TotalEnergies agreed to continue its activities; the other companies left Algeria.

Beginning on December 10, 1979, a conference on the exploitation of petroleum recommended increasing participation in the research efforts by foreign companies and countries. By a decree published in the Journal Officiel on May 17, 1980, Sonatrach was divided into four enterprises.

From 1986, it became possible for foreign hydrocarbon companies to do business in Algeria within a partnership with Sonatrach (this process was simplified in 1991). The Sonatrach-Gaz de France accord, signed on January 12, 1989, allowed the state to set a compromise price of about $2.30 per million BTUs. A total of 9.5 billion cubic meters of natural gas were delivered annually until 1990, and Sonatrach recovered 850 million francs in arrears, since the accord applied retroactively beginning on November 1, 1987.

In March 2005, the Algerian parliament adopted the hydrocarbon reform bill, encouraging international oil company (IOC) investment in the hydrocarbon sector, which Sonatrach previously dominated. However, 2006 amendments to the hydrocarbon bill created a windfall tax on IOC profits when oil prices top $30 per barrel. This tax reached up to 50% on some contracts. In addition, the amendments gave Sonatrach rights to a 51% or higher participation option on each newly discovered project.

In June 2018, Naturgy signed an agreement with Sonatrach covering 30% of Spain's natural gas imports by pipeline. Sonatrach holds a 4% stake in the shares for the Spanish natural gas distribution company. In 2019, the two companies took over joint control of the Medgaz pipeline between Algeria and Spain, with Sonatrach holding 51% stake and Naturgy the remaining 49%.

On 22 July 2019, the Sonatrach-controlled oil tanker Mesdar was briefly detained as it transited the Straits of Hormuz by the Islamic Republic of Iran. This was a case of mistaken identities because Sonatrach contracted a UK-based operator for the vessel, and the government of Iran was at odds with the government of the UK over the seizure of the oil tanker Grace 1. When they realised their error and released the Mesdar, the seizure of the Stena Impero fulfilled the needs of the government of Iran.

In November 2021, Sonatrach announced that it would be carrying out the development of a 10 MWp photovoltaic plant in the basin of Hassi Berkine in order to supply oil sites within the region.

Sonatrach signed a US$179 million contract on 17 February 2022 with Sinopec from China, to construct an LNG storage tank which will hold 150,000m^{3} at the Skikda gas export terminal.

With the Russian invasion of Ukraine, Sonatrach CEO Hakkar stated in February 2022, that the company would be willing to supply Europe with more gas, however only the unused capacities in the Trans-Mediterranean Pipeline (Transmed) could be transferred to the European market. The Transmed pipeline which is operated with Eni, has a yearly capacity of approximately 32 billion cubic meters, to which 22 billion cubic meters of exported gas is already accounted for in various contracts. However, in April 2022, Hakkar went back on his statement from February, saying that Sonatrach would not be able to be an alternative provider of Russian gas.

In March 2022, Sonatrach and Eni made a major discovery of oil and gas in the Zemlet el Arbi concession, as the HDLE-1 well was drilled, one of five to be placed in the Berkine North basin.

Eni and Sonatrach signed an agreement in April 2022 to increase the amount of gas imported to Italy through the TransMed / Enrico Mattei pipeline to up to 9 billion cubic meters per year by 2023/24.

It was confirmed in June 2022 from PTT Exploration and Production (PTTEP) that the Hassi Bir Rekaiz had hit first oil, they have 49% stake in the project, where as Sonatrach holds the other 51%. The targeted production rate for the project is 13,000 barrels of crude a day, which will boost the Thai companies total production volumes and support its growth.

In July 2022, Sonatrach and its partners announced a production sharing contract (PSC) which will invest a total of $4 billion over the course of 25 years into onshore blocks located in the prolific Berkine basin. The agreement includes 3D seismic acquisitions, converting 46 wells into WAG process wells, as well as drilling an additional 100 oil wells. Over the course of the years various opportunity assessments for development will also be carried out.

In August 2022, Sonatrach in collaboration with Eni made a new oil discovery at Haasi Illatou in the Adrar province. This discovery comes 28 years after the last discovery of oil in the region. The same month, an EPC contract was acquired by Petrofac for the Tinrhert Development Project, the original EPC1 that was acquired in 2018 covered the new inlet separation and compression centre. This new EPC makes Petrofac responsible for Alrar separation and boosting facilities. The almost $300 million valued project contract was given to Sonatrach for the EPC2 of the Tinrhert Development Project, which includes a new central processing facility with an inlet separation and decarbonisation unit.

Multiple oil and gas discoveries were made in the summer of 2022 including one that is close to the Hassi R'Mel field, two were found during exploration in the Ekker Sud West-1 well, and there were positive results during drilling in the Tamzaia-3.

With the ongoing supply problems to Europe from Russia, Sonatrach began contemplating ways to benefit from the gas price rises in 2022. With the increase in Algeria's role as supplier and trying to recover the loses from previous years, considerate price reviews were being made for each company in which they supply too.

At the end of 2022, production operations began at the Tinrhert gas field. Each day it is estimated that 500 tons of liquefied natural gas and 800 tons of condensate will be produced. Sonatrach also signed a contract with Geoplin for the supply of natural gas to Slovenia via pipelines through Tunisia, the Mediterranean Sea and Italy. The delivery started in January 2023 and is expected to run until December 2025.

For 2023, Sonatrach announced that they would increase the yearly output to 200 million TOE, which they have not reached since 2010. They also plan to sign new agreements with Eni, which will also include electrical supply. Algeria faced declines in the energy sector for the last decade but due to the Russian invasion of Ukraine and new investment laws, they have recovered in the last year becoming the biggest gas supplier to Italy. Both companies will work together to find ways to increase the transport capacity of the existing gas supplies as well as planning a new pipeline which will transport hydrogen. In addition, undersea electrical cables connecting the two countries are in the planning to increase Algeria's LNG production capacity.

A new project in 2023 in Sicily has Sonatrach joining Sasol (SOLJ.J) to produce low carbon hydrogen and syngas. The „Hybla” project will possibly become the largest hydrogen producer in Italy, with expected production of 7,800 tonnes of hydrogen and 25,000 tonnes of syngas yearly. Another project planned to begin construction in July 2023, is the polypropylene (PP) plant in Algeria through the cooperation between Total and Sonatrach. It is intended that a capacity of 550,000 tonnes of homopolymer should be achieved yearly at the STEP PP plant.

On 10 July 2023, Sonatrach and TotalEnergies signed amended contracts for their Tin Fouye Tabankort II (TFTII) and Tin Fouye Tabankort Sud (TFT Sud) fields. The original contracts were converted to comply with Algeria's 2019 petroleum law, and the companies agreed to upgrade the facilities already in place and increase production by drilling additional wells. An additional agreement was also signed between the two companies to explore renewable energy projects and develop low carbon energy programmes.

After 10 years of force majeure, Sonatrach, Eni and BP resumed exploration in their blocks in the Ghadames Basin (A-B) and offshore Block C in August 2023, continuing their contract obligations. Sonatrach also resumed exploration in blocks 065 and 96/95 in the same location.

In April 2024, Sonatrach and TotalEnergies signed an MoU for the development of the North-East Timimoun region gas resources. The complex is made up of 37 wells which are connected to the gas processing facility leading though the pipelines to Hassi R’mel and TotalEnergies has been managing it since 2018. Earlier in the year, Sonatrach and TotalEnergies extended their LNG contracts to 2025 for an additional 2 million tons of LNG.

In May 2024, Sonatrach signed an agreement with ExxonMobil to study existing opportunities for developing hydrocarbon resources in Ahnet and Gourara basins in Southern Algeria. An EPC was also awarded to Baker Hughes and Tecnimont for the work at Hassi R’Mel gas field. The project, worth $2.3 billion, includes the construction of 3 new gas boosting stations with turbo compressors and upgrading of over 300 km of existing gas flowlines.

== Subsidiaries and joint ventures ==
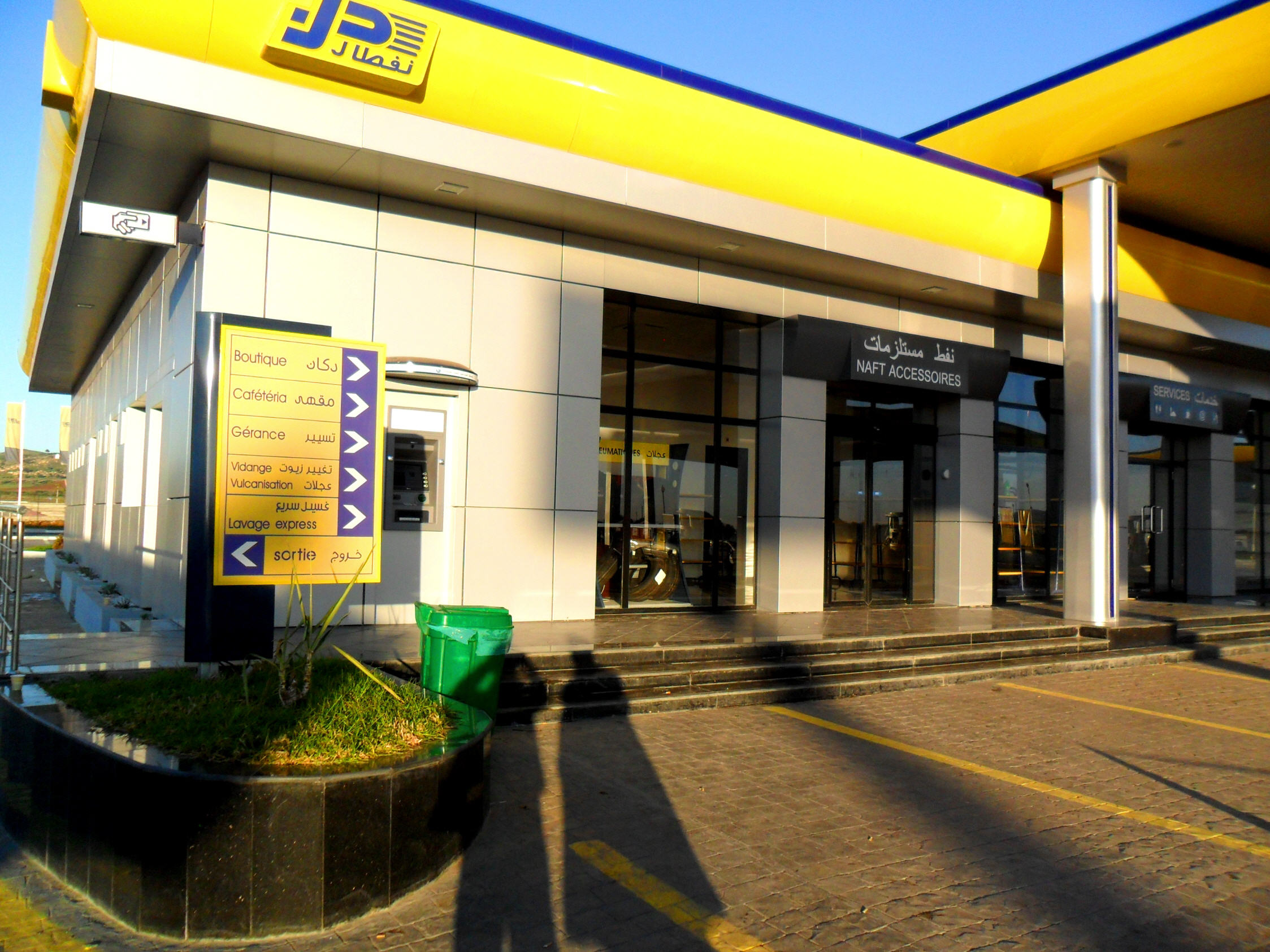
A Naftal station

Sonatrach owns 50% of Numhyd, a joint venture with Tunisia's ETAP and ALEPCO, a joint venture with Libya's National Oil Corporation. In 1998, Sonatrach acquired Naftal, which is the principal company selling petroleum-based fuels for domestic consumption with about 10,000 gas stations (as of 2005). Naftec, a subsidiary of Sonatrach, operates Algeria's four refineries, which have combined capacity of 450,000 bbl/d (72,000 m^{3}/d). The Skikda refinery (300,000 bpd) provides the bulk of Algeria's refined products production. The 30,000 bbl/d (4,800 m^{3}/d) Hassi Messaoud refinery supplies products to southern Algeria, while the 60,000 bbl/d (9,500 m^{3}/d) Algiers refinery processes crude from Hassi Messaoud for consumption in the capital. Finally, the coastal 60,000 bbl/d (9,500 m^{3}/d) Arzew refinery produces products for domestic consumption and export. In July 2006, Sonatrach and the China National Petroleum Corporation (CNPC) brought online the small-13,000 bpd Adrar refinery, which is located near the village of Sbaa 40 km (25 mi) north of Adrar.

On July 1, 2018, Sonatrach appointed Youcef Ghazli to head the Foreign Investment Division, which oversees all investments in Europe.

In March 2022, Naftal officials signed a US$364 million engineering, procurement and construction (EPC) contract with Sonatrach's pipeline unit TRC. The pipeline should only take about 48 months to construct, and it would run 424 km from Arzew to Chlef, carrying about 1.2 million tonnes of LPG a year.

=== Tassili Airlines ===
A joint venture between Air Algérie (49%) and Sonatrach (51%) in 1998 established the passenger airline company Tassili Airlines. Commercial services were launched on 8 April 1999 with a flight from Hassi Messaoud to Algiers. In 2005, Air Algérie withdrew 50% of its funds in the airline, which thus became 76% owned by Sonatrach. In 2006, Sonatrach gave Tassili Airlines permission to expand its domestic destinations and for the future opening of international routes.

=== Eni ===
In July 2020, Sonatrach signed a contract with Italian company Eni. The contract which will run until 2049, includes the production marketing from three gas fields located in the south-east of the country. The three fields are Sif Fatima II, Zemlet El Arbi and Ourhoud II. An additional memorandum of understanding (MoU) was signed in December 2020 in order to boost exploration and production, as well as implement training activities. In March 2021, a new MoU was signed between the companies to focus on renewable energy, biofuels and hydrogen sectors. Various other agreements were also signed to cover exploration and production, research and development, decarbonization and training, and to strengthen the two companies' partnership. In April 2022, the CEOs of Sonatrach, Touffik Hakkar, and Eni, Claudio Descalzi, signed a contract to increase gas supplies to Italy through the Trans-Mediterranean Pipeline. Beginning in 2022, supply should increase gradually to 9 billion cubic meters per year in 2023-24. Near the end of 2022, Sonatrach and Eni began producing 10,000 barrels of oil daily at the HDLE/HDLS oil field in the Berkin Basin. The amount of output is to be increased to 17,000 barrels a day with the additional drilling planned in 2023.

=== Naturgy ===
In June 2018, Naturgy signed an agreement with Sonatrach covering 30% of Spain's natural gas imports by pipeline. Sonatrach holds a 4% stake in the shares for the Spanish natural gas distribution company. In 2019, the two companies took over joint control of Medgaz, with Sonatrach holding 51% stake and Naturgy the remaining 49%. Renegotiations of the supply agreement were made in 2020, in order to revise the prices, volume and duration.

== Algerian hydrocarbon sector ==
Hydrocarbons play a crucial role in Algeria's economy, accounting for roughly 60% of budget revenues and over 95% of export earnings. The country ranks fourteenth in petroleum reserves, containing 11.8 billion barrels (1.88×10^{9} m^{3}) of proven oil reserves with estimates suggesting that the actual amount is even more. The U.S. Energy Information Administration reported that in 2005, Algeria had 160 trillion cubic feet (Tcf) of proven natural gas reserves, the eighth largest in the world. As a result, Sonatrach is very important politically. Most Energy Ministers of Algeria have come from a Sonatrach background.

== Corruption scandals ==
Sonatrach suspended all of its senior management after two of the company's vice-presidents were imprisoned for corruption. Algeria's Energy Minister, Chakib Khelil announced the president of the company and several executives have been placed under judicial supervision. In 2013, Khelil was also accused of receiving a bribe from a subsidiary of the Italian energy company Eni.

In May 2020, an arrest warrant was issued against a representative of Sonatrach in Lebanon, as part of a greater operation against embezzlement of public funds in contribution with Lebanese officials. Abdelmoumen Ould Kaddour, who was chief executive of Sonatrach from March 2017 to April 2019, was arrested in February 2021, and in August of that year he was extradited from the United Arab Emirates, all related to his alleged involvement in various corruption cases. In February 2022, ex-energy minister Chakib Khelil was sentenced in absentia to 20 years in prison for corruption. Mohamed Meziane, CEO of Sonatrach from 2003 to 2010, was fined د.ج 2,000,000 (US$14,808) and sentenced to five years in prison.

== Presidents ==
- Sid Ahmed Ghozali (1966–1977)
- Youcef Yousfi (1985–1988)
- Sadek Boussena (1988–1990)
- Abdelhak Bouhafs (1990–1995)
- Nazim Zouioueche (March 1999 – 2000)
- Chakib Khelil (March 2001 – 2003)
- Mohamed Meziane (September 2003 – 2010)
- Nordine Cherouati (May 2010 – December 2011)
- Abdelhamid Zerguine (December 2011 – July 2014)
- Said Sahnoune (July 2014 – June 2015)
- Amine Mazouzi (June 2015 – March 2017)
- Abdelmoumen Ould Kaddour (March 2017 – April 2019)
- Rachid Hachichi (April 2019 – November 2019)
- Kamel Eddine Chikhi (November 2019 – February 2020)
- Toufik Hakkar (February 2020 – October 2023)
- Rachid Hachichi (October 2023 – October 2025)
- Noureddine Daoudi (October 2025 - Present)

== See also ==
- LNG El Paso Sonatrach
