= Chakib Khelil =

Algerian political figure (born 1939)

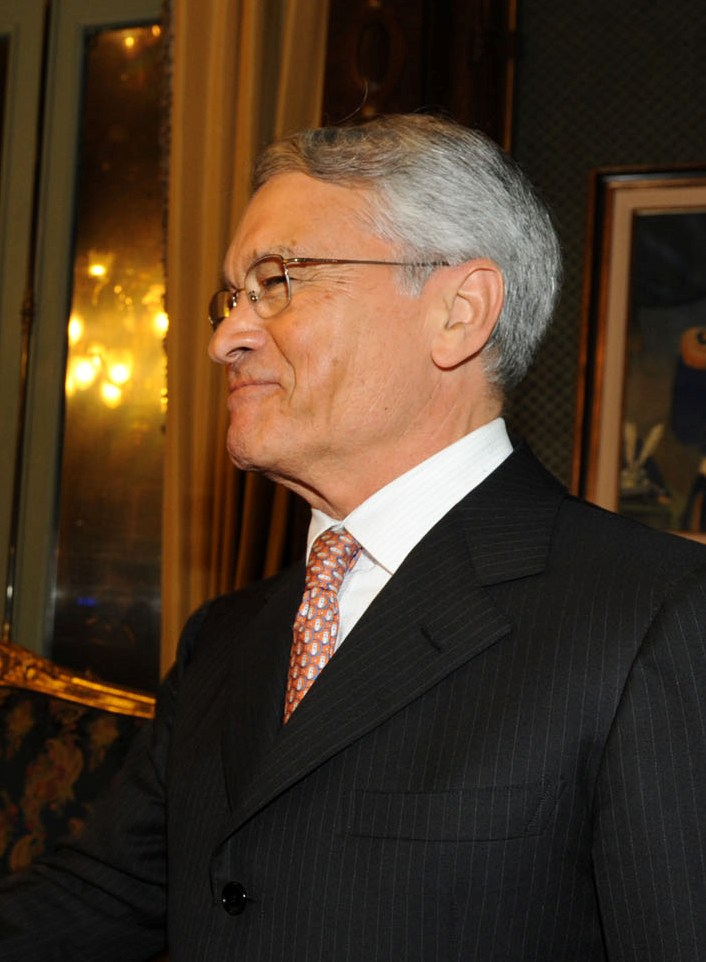
- Chakib Khelil, May 2009
- Born: 8 August 1939 (age 86); Oujda, Morocco
- Occupations: former Minister of Energy and Mines

Chakib Khelil (Arabic: شكيب خليل; born 8 August 1939) is an Algerian political figure who served in the government of Algeria as Minister of Energy and Mines from 1999 to 2010.

== Early life and education ==
Khelil was born on 8 August 1939 in Oujda, Morocco. He received a bachelor and master degrees in mining and petroleum engineering from Ohio State University in 1964 and 1965, respectively. He also obtained a doctorate in petroleum engineering from Texas A&M University in 1968.

== Career ==
After working in the United States for a few years with Shell, Phillips Petroleum and D.R. McCord & Associates, Khelil joined Sonatrach in 1971 as head of its reservoir engineering department while being president of Alcore, a joint venture between Corelaboratories and Sonatrach. Then he became technical adviser in the presidency of Algeria from 1973 to 1975. He was appointed president of the Valhyd Group (with Valhyd standing for valorisation hydrocarbures in French) in 1975–1978. Next he served as coordinator in the hydrocarbon vice presidency of Sonatrach.

In 1980 he joined the World Bank, working on petroleum-related projects in Africa, Latin America and Asia; he retired from it as its petroleum adviser in 1999, only to join President Abdelaziz Bouteflika's cabinet on 1 November 1999, becoming Minister for Energy and Mines on 26 December 1999.

In 2001, while a minister, he was also named president of Sonatrach, and he nominated and was succeeded by Mohamed Meziane in 2003. He was also president of OPEC for the years 2001 and 2008, president of the African Energy Commission (AFREC) in 2001, president of the Association of African Oil Producing Countries (APPA) in 2004 and the Gas Exporting Countries Forum (GECF) in 2010.

On February 1, 2022, the prosecution requested 20 years in prison for corruption against the former Algerian Minister of Energy Chakib Khelil, in office from 1999 to 2010 under the presidency of Abdelaziz Bouteflika and who is located in the United States.

On February 14, 2022, the Sidi M'Hamed court sentenced Chakib Khelil in absentia to 20 years in prison and a fine of 2 million Algerian dinars. The court also confirmed the request for an international arrest warrant for Chakib Khelil.
