= Department of Agriculture, Forestry and Fisheries (Niue) =

Federal department of Niue

Niue's Department of Agriculture, Forestry and Fisheries (DAFF) is a division of Niue's Ministry of Natural Resources alongside the Department of Environment and the Department of Meteorological Service. The key pelagic fisheries of Niue consist of tuna - including albacore, bigeye, skipjack, and yellowfin - as well as billfish, mahi mahi, and wahoo. Other key fisheries include cod, sea cucumbers, crustaceans and shellfish, and trevally. Niue has a 470,000 square kilometer exclusive economic zone in which it may fish.

The director of DAFF is Poi Okesene.

The management and development of Niue's fisheries is guided by a number of policies:

- Territorial Sea and Exclusive Economic Zones Act 1996
- Domestic Fishing Act 1995
- Domestic Fishing Regulations 1996
- Territorial Sea and Exclusive Economic Zone License (Fees) Regulations 2010

In 2015, the Cabinet of Niue made a decision to ban the exportation of uga (coconut crab) from Niue. As a preventative measure, biosecurity officers at New Zealand's airports have begun checking passengers travelling from Niue.
