= Ministry for the Environment =

Ministry for the Environment may refer to:

- Ministry for the Environment (Chile)
- Ministry for the Environment (Hungary)
- Ministry for the Environment (Iceland)
- Ministry for the Environment (New Zealand)
- Ministry of Environment (Colombia)
- Ministry of the Environment (Czech Republic)
- Ministry of the Environment (Finland)
- Ministry of the Environment (Haiti)
- Ministry of the Environment (Italy)
- Ministry of the Environment (Japan)
- Ministry of Environment (Lebanon)
- Ministry of the Environment (Ontario)
- Ministry of the Environment (Portugal)
- Ministry of the Environment (Singapore)
- Ministry of Environment (Spain)
- Ministry of the Environment (Sweden)
- Ministry of Environment of Uruguay

== See also ==
- Federal Ministry for the Environment, Climate Action, Nature Conservation and Nuclear Safety (Germany)
- Ministry of Climate, Energy and Environment (South Korea)
- Ministry of Environment, Forest and Climate Change (India)
- List of environmental ministries
