= Energy in Algeria =

Total energy supply 2026
1. Coal (0.22%)
2. Oil (30.9%)
3. Biofuels and Waste (0.00%)
4. Natural gas (60.8%)
5. Wind, Solar, etc. (8.02%)
6. Hydro (0.00%)

Energy in Algeria encompasses the production, consumption, and import of energy. As of 2009, the primary energy use in Algeria was 462 TWh, with a per capita consumption of 13 TWh. Algeria is a significant producer and exporter of oil and gas and has been a member of the Organization of the Petroleum Exporting Countries (OPEC) since 1969. It also participates in the OPEC+ agreement, collaborating with non-OPEC oil-producing nations. Historically, the country has relied heavily on fossil fuels, which are heavily subsidized and constitute the majority of its energy consumption. In response to global energy trends, Algeria updated its Renewable Energy and Energy Efficiency Development Plan in 2015, aiming for significant advancements by 2030. This plan promotes the deployment of large-scale renewable technologies, such as solar photovoltaic systems and onshore wind installations, supported by various incentive measures.

In a strategic move to further develop its energy sector, the Algerian government announced in 2023 plans to offer at least 10 exploration blocks in its first upstream bidding round since 2014, signaling a proactive approach to expanding its oil and gas exploration efforts. Complementing this initiative, Algeria has intensified its exploration efforts, resulting in eight significant discoveries this year alone. The country aims to increase its natural gas production from the current 137 billion cubic meters (Bcm) to 200 Bcm per year in the short to medium term. As of 2024, Algeria is producing approximately 900,000 barrels of oil per day, aligning with its OPEC+ production target. Amid ongoing reviews of crude oil output capacities by OPEC+, Algeria has confidently projected that it will reach a production capacity of 1.155 million barrels per day by 2025.

== Overview ==
Energy in Algeria
	Capita	Prim. energy	Production	Export	Electricity	CO_{2}-emission
	Million	TWh	TWh	TWh	TWh	Mt
2004	32.4	383	1,927	1,539	26.3	77.8
2007	33.9	429	1,911	1,482	30.6	85.7
2008	34.4	431	1,885	1,439	32.9	88.1
2009	23.5	462	1,771	1,299	44.6	92.5
2010	35.47	470	1,751	1,268	36.4	98.6
2012	35.98	487	1,696	1,201	41.2	103,9
2012R	38.48	539	1,672	1,131	46.3	114.4
2013	39.21	553	1,601	1,037	48.8	113.9
Change 2004-10	9.6%	22.7%	-9.2%	-17.6%	38.5%	26.6%
Mtoe = 11.63 TWh 2012R = CO_{2} calculation criteria changed, numbers updated

== Natural gas ==
Countries by natural gas proven reserves (2014)

In 2023, Algeria had 159 trillion cubic feet (Tcf) of proven natural gas reserves. Between 2012 and 2021, annual dry natural gas production averaged 3.2 Tcf, while consumption averaged 1.5 Tcf. Despite a production drop in 2020 due to the COVID-19 pandemic's impact on economic activities, production rebounded to a record 3.6 Tcf in 2021. According to the Middle East Economic Survey, this increase was driven by upstream investments leading to new project startups and expansions, notably at the Hassi R’Mel field. Additionally, a decreased need for gas reinjection at oil fields allowed more natural gas to be available for domestic use and export.

Natural gas Production 2011-2021 (billion cubic metres)
2011	2012	2013	2014	2015	2016	2017	2018	2019	2020	2021	2022	2023
79.6	78.4	79.3	80.2	81.4	91.4	93.0	93.8	87.0	81.5	100.8	97.6	101.5

Historically, Algeria has been a significant player in the global natural gas market. In 2009, it was the fifth-largest exporter of natural gas, with a net export of 55 billion cubic meters (bcm), trailing behind Russia (169 bcm), Norway (100 bcm), Canada (76 bcm), and Qatar (67 bcm). That year, Algeria was also ranked as the seventh-largest natural gas producer globally, producing 81 bcm, with the top producers being the USA (594 bcm), Russia (589 bcm), and Canada (159 bcm).

Algeria electricity production by year

By 2021, Algeria's role in the natural gas sector had continued to grow. Its domestic production of natural gas reached 3,734,001 terajoules (TJ), a 28% increase from previous years. This escalation in production positioned Algeria as the second-largest supplier of natural gas in Africa, with a total supply of 1,775,215 TJ, following Egypt. This robust production not only meets domestic energy needs but also bolsters economic stability through exports and the provision of raw materials for key industries such as chemicals and plastics.

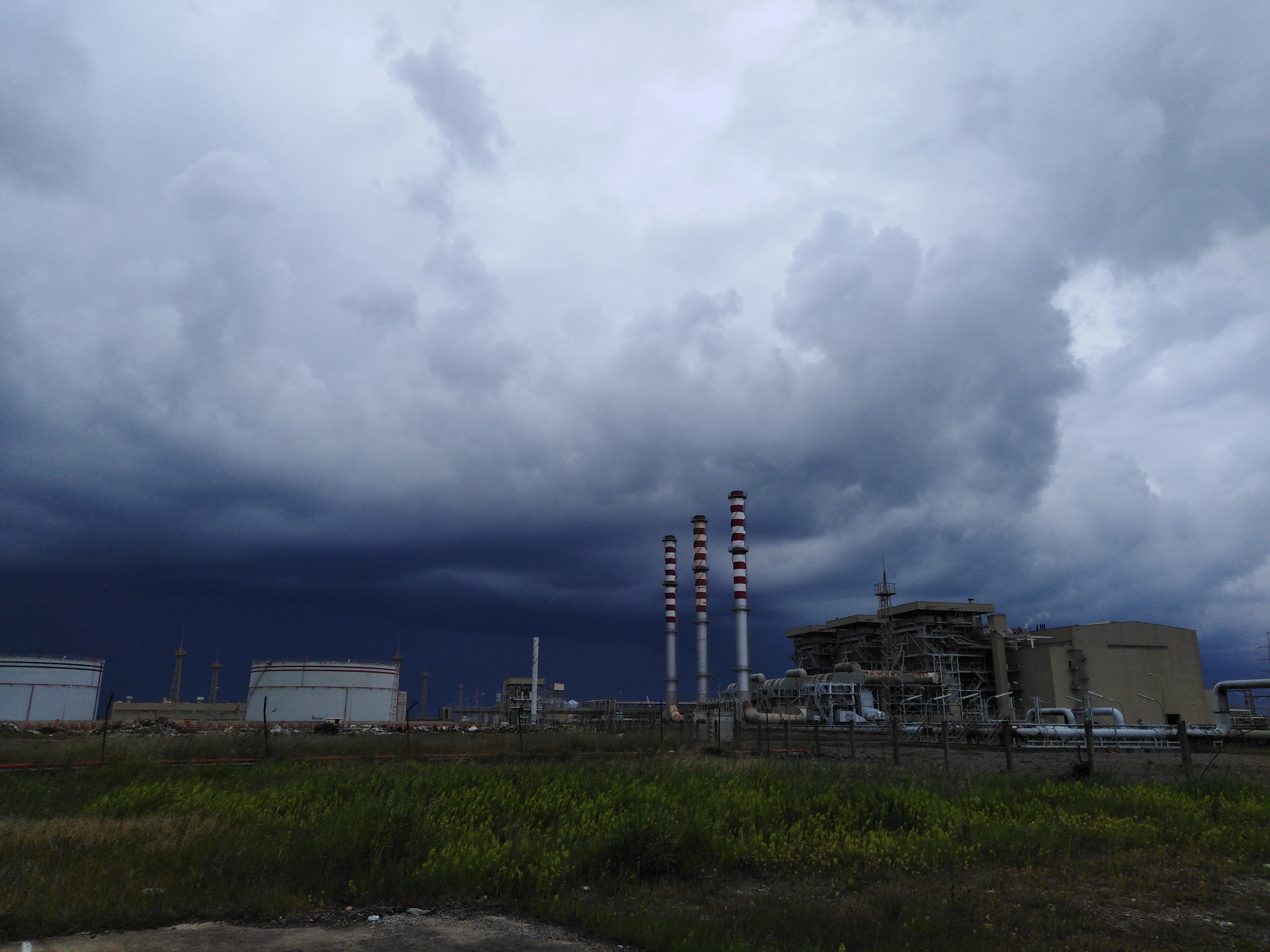
Jijel power plant

=== Gas pipelines ===
Algeria is a key player in the natural gas export market, primarily serving Europe through three strategic pipelines: the Trans-Mediterranean Pipeline (TransMed), the Medgaz, and the Maghreb-Europe (MEG) pipeline. The increased capacity of the Medgaz pipeline at the end of 2021 significantly improved its delivery capabilities to Spain. Despite encountering temporary disruptions in 2021 due to political tensions that affected the MEG pipeline, normal operations resumed in 2022 with an unconventional reversal, enabling Spain to export gas to Morocco. Following the geopolitical shifts caused by Russia's invasion of Ukraine, Algeria has increased its role as a crucial supplier of natural gas to Europe, now accounting for about 14% of the European Union’s total imports of pipeline gas and LNG. Additionally, Algeria is actively considering future pipeline projects like the Trans-Saharan Gas Pipeline, aimed at connecting Nigeria to European markets through Algeria, and the GALSI pipeline, which could potentially be utilized for transporting green hydrogen to Italy.

- The Trans-Mediterranean Pipeline (TransMed) is a natural gas pipeline from Algeria via Tunisia to Sicily and Italy constructed in 1978-1983 and 1991-1994.
- The Maghreb–Europe Gas Pipeline is 1,620 kilometres long natural gas pipeline from Algeria via Morocco to Spain.
- The Medgaz Pipeline is a natural gas pipeline from Algeria to Spain.

=== Shale gas ===
Algeria possessed seven basins of undeveloped shale gas by 2020, totaling 3,419 trillion cubic feet. Of this amount, approximately 707 trillion cubic feet are technically recoverable with existing technology, positioning Algeria's recoverable shale gas reserves as the third largest globally, following China and Argentina.

== Oil ==
Algeria is a member of OPEC and was the seventh-largest oil products exporter in 2008, accounting for less than 11% of the world's oil exports. That year, the total global exports included 1,952 million tons of crude oil and 411 million tons of oil products. Prominent oil fields in Algeria include Hassi Messaoud, Ourhoud, and Rhourde El Baguel. As of 2022, the country produces approximately one million barrels of crude oil per day.

Oil Production 2011-2021 (kb/d)
2011	2012	2013	2014	2015	2016	2017	2018	2019	2020	2021	2022	2023
1642	1537	1485	1589	1558	1577	1540	1511	1487	1330	1353	1443	1408

The country holds an estimated 12.2 billion barrels of proved crude oil reserves as of early 2023, producing high-quality, light, sweet crude oil with very low sulfur content, primarily the Sahara blend from Hassi Messaoud. Despite these high-grade reserves, Algeria faces challenges in attracting new investment to its aging oil fields, leading to difficulties in maintaining production levels.

In response, the Algerian government introduced a hydrocarbons law in December 2019 to attract international investment by reducing taxes and simplifying the legal framework for upstream activities. Additionally, Sonatrach, the state-owned oil company, operates all national refineries and has begun construction on three new refineries—Hassi Messaoud, Biskra, and Tiaret—expected to begin operations within the next five years.

In 2021, Algeria's total oil supply, combining crude and refined products, amounted to 902,997 terajoules (TJ), marking a 125% increase from 2000. This total includes crude oil production, imports, and adjustments for exports and storage. Domestic crude oil production alone accounted for 151.7% of the total crude oil supply in 2021, reflecting a 10% increase over the same period. Additionally, net crude oil exports constituted 34.4% of Algeria's total crude oil production in 2021, with the export share of crude oil comprising 25% of the total energy exports.

== Electricity ==
Electricity final consumption by sector, 2021
1. Industry (34.0%)
2. Transport (2.88%)
3. Residential (39.2%)
4. Commercial and public services (6.01%)
5. Agriculture / forestry (3.94%)
6. Non-specified (14.0%)

Algeria primarily relies on fossil fuels for energy generation, with nearly 97% of its electricity capacity derived from these sources. The country has seen significant growth in its electricity capacity, which nearly doubled from 2011 to 2020, mainly due to the addition of more efficient natural gas-fired and combined-cycle gas turbine plants. However, Algeria is also aiming to increase its renewable energy capacity to 15 GW by 2035, starting with a solicitation for bids to install 1 GW of solar photovoltaic capacity divided into 11 projects. This move is part of the government's strategy to diversify energy sources and attract foreign investment in renewable energy projects.

Natural gas was the predominant source of electricity generation, accounting for 99% of the total electricity production which amounted to 85,390 GWh. This significant dependence on natural gas is echoed in the growth of electricity production, which saw a 236% increase from 2000 to 2021.

Electricity generation 2011–2021 (TWh)
2011	2012	2013	2014	2015	2016	2017	2018	2019	2020	2021	2022	2023
53.1	57.4	59.9	64.2	68.8	71.0	76.0	76.7	81.5	79.2	84.3	91.2	85.9

Despite this heavy reliance on fossil fuels, electricity trade in Algeria remains limited, with net electricity exports comprising only 1.3% of the total production in 2021, although these exports have increased by 379% since 2000. The electricity sector is a major contributor to carbon dioxide emissions, representing 30% of the country's total energy-related carbon dioxide emissions. On a per-capita basis, electricity consumption in Algeria stood at 1.704 MWh in 2021, showing a 147% increase from 2000, reflecting ongoing economic and population growth. Additionally, the residential sector was the largest consumer of electricity, accounting for 39% of the final electricity consumption, followed by the industrial sector with 34%.

== Renewable energy ==
Algeria is focusing on increasing its renewable energy output to 27% by 2035, primarily through solar power, leveraging its high solar irradiance and strong wind speeds. In efforts to conserve its hydrocarbon resources for export, the government has established partnerships with countries like China, Germany, and the United States, centering on enhancing engineering, energy storage, and solar technology capacities. Key projects include a one-gigawatt solar initiative and Sonatrach's use of solar energy for its remote operations. The sector, predominantly managed by state-owned entities such as Sonatrach, Sonelgaz, and the Algerian Energy Company (AEC), also sees significant involvement from international firms, enhancing the local renewable energy infrastructure through investments and collaborative governmental agreements.

Total renewable energy capacity 2014–2024 (MW)
2014	2015	2016	2017	2018	2019	2020	2021	2022	2023	2024
266	300	500	593	605	605	585	506	590	601	601

As of 2020, modern renewables accounted for just 0.14% of Algeria's final energy consumption, despite a significant increase of 52% in their usage from 2000 to 2020. This growth highlights Algeria's efforts to shift towards cleaner energy sources to reduce carbon dioxide emissions and reliance on imported fossil fuels. Modern renewables in Algeria are primarily utilized for electricity generation and have potential applications in heating and renewable biofuels for transport. However, the country still faces challenges in phasing out traditional biomass uses, which adversely affect health and the environment.

Significant reforms in hydrocarbons and investment laws since 2020 have improved the investment environment in Algeria, enabling it to attract deals with global energy companies like Equinor, Eni, and Occidental Petroleum. These reforms, designed to foster both domestic and foreign investment, reflect Algeria's broader strategy to diversify its energy portfolio and sustain its economic growth by leveraging its energy resources more efficiently and responsibly.

=== Solar power ===
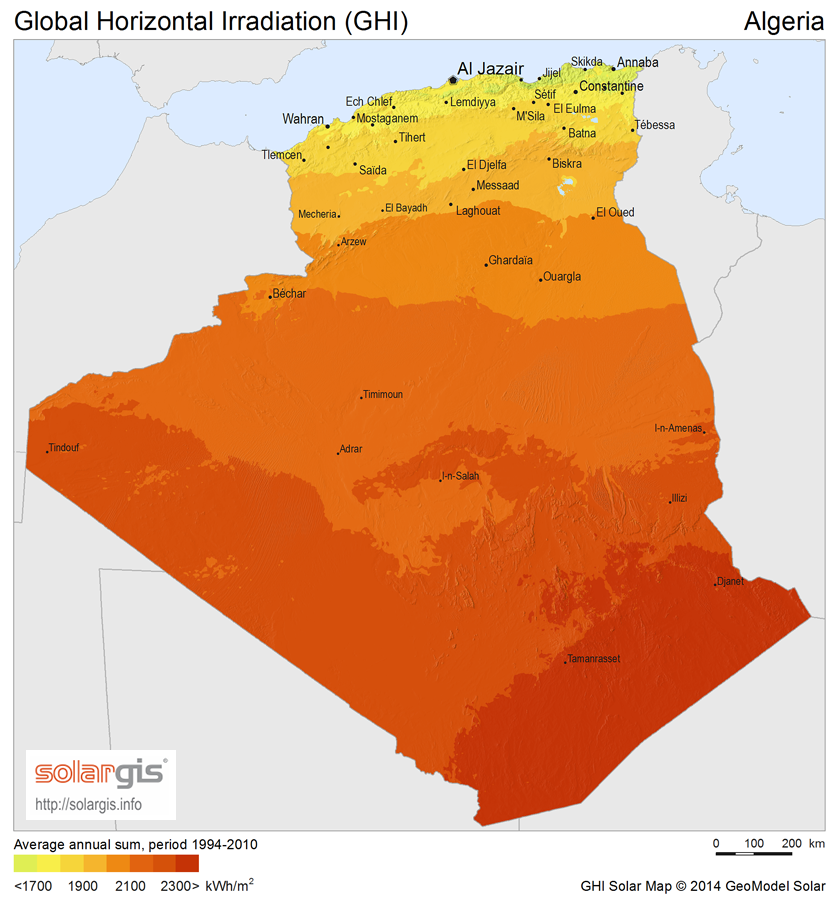
Solar potential in Algeria

Algeria is rapidly advancing its renewable energy agenda, targeting 15,000 megawatts (MW) or the equivalent of 15 gigawatts (GW) of solar power capacity by 2035 to reduce dependence on natural gas there are 45 active solar power projects in Algeria, valued at a combined US$6.1 billion. Algeria currently produces approximately 27,000 MW (27 GW) of electricity, according to ministry data. For 2026, Algeria is to commission Nine Solar Power Plants Totaling 1,480 MW (1.48 GW) by august for the first phase of the program to produce 3,200 MW (3.2 GW) of renewable energy which will also include the Ghar Djebilet solar power station and the Adrar wind farm for the entire program. Algeria has the highest technical and economical potential for solar power exploitation in the MENA region, with a potential of around 170 TWh per year. The first industrial scale solar thermal power project has been initiated by inauguration of Hassi R'Mel power station in 2011. This new hybrid power plant combines a 25-megawatt (MW) concentrating solar power array in conjunction with a 130 MW combined cycle gas turbine plant.

In addition, Algeria has launched in 2011 a national program to develop renewable energy based on photovoltaics (PV), concentrated solar power (CSP) and wind power, and to promote energy efficiency. The program consists of installing up to 12 GW of power generating capacity from renewable sources to meet the domestic electricity demand by 2030.

Solar energy capacity 2014–2026 (MW)
2014	2015	2016	2017	2018	2019	2020	2021	2022	2023	2024	2025	2026
28	62	262	355	367	367	367	367	451	462	462	600	2380

In 2023, Algeria launched a bid for the construction of 15 solar power plants across the country, each with a generation capacity of 80-220 MW, and a total capacity of 2,000 MW for the entirety of the project, with construction set to begin in 2024. On y 2026, Algeria commissioned three new solar plants, the 200 MW Tendla plant in El M'Ghair Province, and the 220 MW El Ghrous plant in Biskra Province and the 300 MW El-Foulia facility, El Oued Province.

Largest Algerian photovoltaic power stations
PV Power station	Capacity in MW _{p}	Notes
High Plateaus East, Adrar	90	completed 2016, Built by Sinohydro Corp (PowerChina), Yingli Green Energy Holding, HydroChina, owned by SKTM (Sonelgaz)
High Plateaus Centre, Adrar	90	completed 2016, Built by Sinohydro Corp (PowerChina), Yingli Green Energy Holding, HydroChina, owned by SKTM (Sonelgaz)
El Ghrous, Biskra Province	220	completed 2026, owned by SKTM (Sonelgaz)
Tendla, El M'Ghair Province	200	completed 2026, owned by SKTM (Sonelgaz)
El-Foulia facility, El Oued Province	300	completed october 26, 2026
Laghouat, Biskra provnce	400	completed august 2026.

== Greenhouse gas emissions ==
In 2021, Algeria contributed 0.4% to the global CO_{2} emissions from combustible fuels, based on data focused solely on emissions from fuel combustion within the energy sector. The total emissions were recorded at about 143.249 million tonnes (Mt) of CO_{2}, which represents a significant rise of 133% compared to previous figures. The primary source of these emissions was the combustion of natural gas, which made up 62% of Algeria's total CO_{2} emissions from fuel combustion.

Carbon dioxide emissions from energy 2011-2021 (MtCO2)
2011	2012	2013	2014	2015	2016	2017	2018	2019	2020	2021	2022	2023
100.6	108.9	115.4	123.6	129.0	127.7	130.7	137.7	142.5	133.3	139.7	149.6	144.7

The analysis of emissions by sector shows that electricity and heat production, along with the transport sector, were the major sources of energy-related CO_{2} emissions in Algeria, each contributing 30% to the total. These figures highlight the significant reliance on oil-based fuels in both the power generation and transportation sectors, despite the increasing adoption of electric vehicles. Meanwhile, the industrial sector, which includes the burning of fossil fuels for processes such as the production of paper or steel, also contributes notably to the emissions but to a lesser extent. Notably, emissions from specific industrial processes like cement production are not included in these figures, despite their potential significance.

== Nuclear energy ==
To ensure Algeria diversifies its energy sources in preparation for the post-oil era, nuclear energy is the only energy source that could replace oil and gas, as its raw material is abundant in the country and just needs to be utilized.

Since 1995 Algeria operates research reactors at Draria and Aïn Oussera. It signed nuclear cooperation agreements with Russia in January 2007, with the United States in June 2007, and with China in March 2008. Algeria has discussed nuclear cooperation also with France.

For many years, Algeria has invested in nuclear technology. It has two nuclear reactors: the Draria nuclear reactor on the heights of Algiers with a capacity of 3 megawatts (MW), built by the Argentinians in 1984, and the Aïn Oussara reactor, located 250 km south of Algiers, built by the Chinese with a capacity of 15 MW. These two reactors are regularly inspected by the International Atomic Energy Agency (IAEA), of which Algeria is a member.

== See also ==
- Oil megaprojects (2011)
- Economy of Algeria
- Naftal company
- Saidal Group
