= Arzew Gas Terminal =

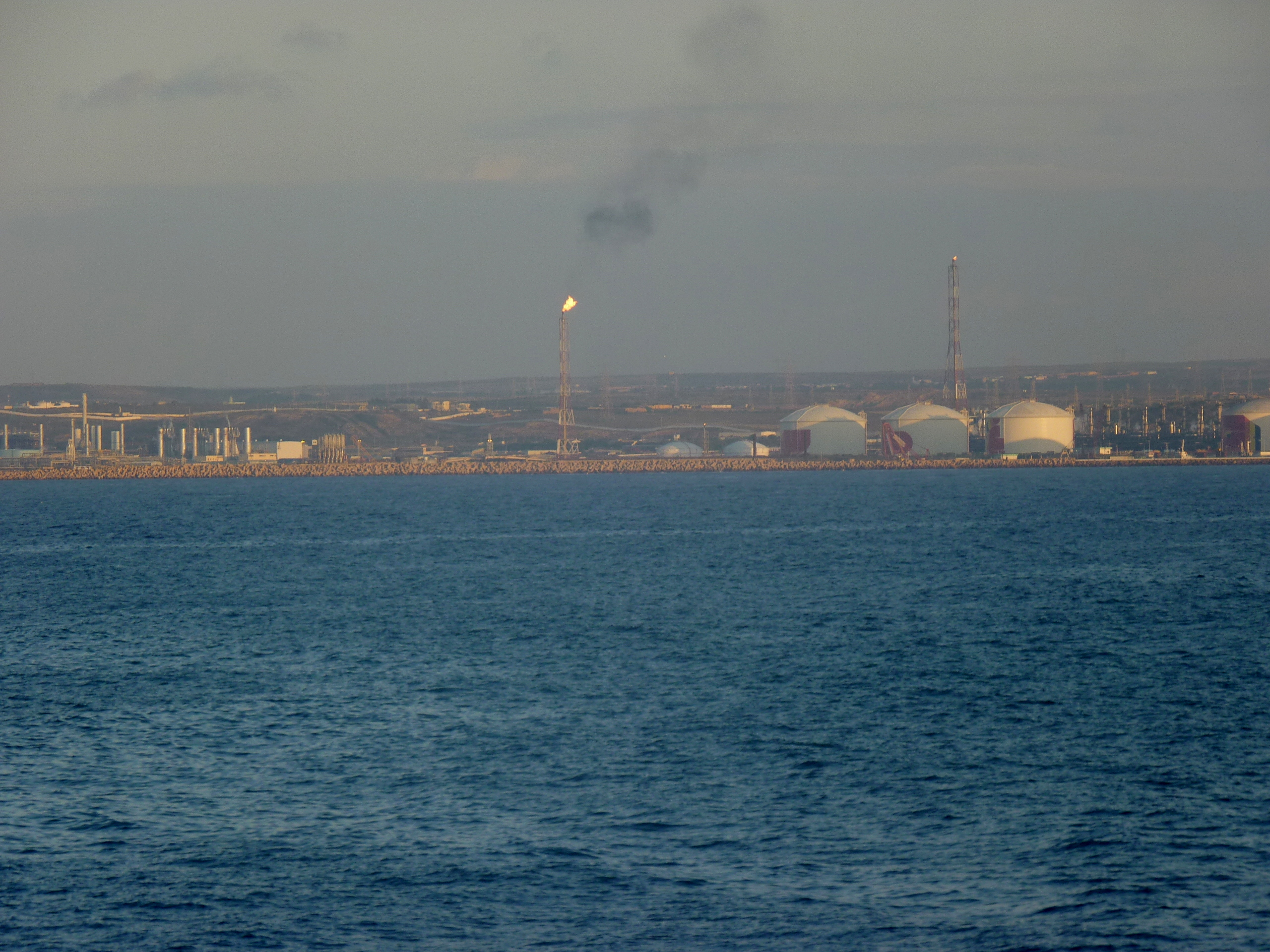
- Gas terminal

- Location within Algeria

General information
- Type: Gas terminal
- Location: Arzew, Algeria
- Coordinates: 35.804°N 0.241°W
- Construction started: 14 September 1962
- Inaugurated: 2 October 1964
- Cost: £31 million

Technical details
- Floor area: 180 acres (0.73 km^{2})

The Arzew Gas Terminal is a large and historically important gas terminal on the coast of Algeria.

The plant brought the first natural gas for the UK from 1964. Its natural gas industry is highly important to the economy of Algeria. The plant was the first of its kind, and is now one of the largest.

== Background ==
Natural gas reserves in Algeria in the 1960s were thought to be so large that the country's reserves could supply the whole of Europe for fifty years. The plan was developed by Sir David Milne-Watson of the Gas Council.

== Construction ==
The plant was opened by Ben Bella on Sunday 27 September 1964, with Sir Harry Jones, the chairman of the Gas Council. The plant cost £31m, with a 280-mile pipeline.

A 28-minute industrial film was made about the project, in April 1965 entitled Saharan Venture, made by World Wide Pictures (UK).

Additional plants opened in 1978, 1981 and July 2014.

== History ==
A similar plant at Skikda was planned in 1967, and opened in 1972. On 19 January 2004 an explosion at this site killed 29 people and caused $940m damage.

Revenues to the country's government were worth about £16m per year in 1967.

A new £9.6m gas separation plant was built in 1972, to produce butane and propane, connected to a 500-mile pipeline to the Hassi Messaoud gas field.

A nearby petrochemical plant and associated oil refinery was built in 1973.

By 2005, Algeria was the second-largest exporter of natural gas to Europe, after Russia. It supplied 20% of Europe's gas, including 50% of the natural gas required by Spain.

The £2bn Gassi Touil project was planned to build a new plant at the site in 2009; it was built by Chiyoda Corporation of Japan and Snamprogetti of Italy, and eventually opened in November 2013.

The original gas plant was decommissioned in 2010.

Prime Minister Ahmed Ouyahia visited the plant on Sunday 1 October 2017, to inaugurate two new natural gas tankers, operated by the Hyproc Shipping Company - the Tessala, named after the town Tessala in Sidi Bel Abbès Province, and Ougarta, named after the Ougarta Range of hills.

=== Supply to the UK ===
In the early 1960s Britain's domestic gas was supplied from 28 million tonnes of coal. How to supply Britain with natural gas was heavily discussed by the Select Committee on Nationalised Industries. On Friday 3 November 1961, the Minister for Power authorised the supply of natural gas by ship from a port in Algeria, supplied by the Hassi R'Mel gas field, at the time the third-largest natural gas field in the world; now it is the 18th-largest.

A contract had been signed by the Gas Council for the supply of natural gas for fifteen years from the plant.

The natural gas was transported by two tankers owned by Shell Tankers, taking 700,000 tons per year of natural gas to Essex, to land owned by the North Thames Gas Board in around sixty journeys every six days. This gas provided 10% of Britain's gas needs. Each tanker carried 12,000 tons, enough for a half day of Britain's needs for gas. The journey time to Essex was four days, over 1500 miles. The first gas arrived in Essex on Wednesday 14 October 1964.

This gas was carried by a new £7.5m 200 mile pipeline, the start of the NTS. It provided first natural gas supply in the UK, after a test shipment in February 1959.

In June 1968, the Gas Council planned a similar plant to cost £3.5m in North Lanarkshire, Scotland, to supply a nearby gas terminal, and a gas terminal in Derbyshire.

=== Supply to France ===
The first tanker to arrive in France unloaded its gas in March 1965, for Gaz de France.

By 1974, most gas from the site was being supplied to France, to a gas terminal at Fos in the south of France. An agreement was signed in late 1972 to supply gas also to Belgium, Switzerland, Austria and southern Germany, via a gas terminal at Monfalcone in Italy.

=== Supply to the United States ===
The first natural gas shipment to the US left on Sunday 30 October 1971. The US had signed a 25-year contract.

=== Operation ===
Algeria had been ruled by the French for 132 years, becoming independent in July 1962, only to be taken over by its army in June 1965 by Houari Boumédiène of the Revolutionary Council, who would stay as leader until 1978. The country was known as the Algerian Democratic People's Republic.

On 10 June 1967, Algeria placed an embargo on exports to the UK. On Monday 26 June 1967 the plant ceased operation; the supply to France stopped as well.

The British tankers were allowed again to load from September 1967.

== Structure ==
The site at Bethioua was built in 1964, which was 180 acres. It could process 50 million square feet of natural gas per day. It had three processing structures - two processed gas for the UK, and the other was for France.

== See also ==
- Energy in Algeria
- List of countries by natural gas production
- Trans-Mediterranean Pipeline
