= Greenstream pipeline =

Natural gas pipeline from Libya to Italy

Greenstream
- Location of Greenstream (in green)

Location
- Country: Libya, Italy
- Direction: south-north
- Start: Wafa, Libya
- Passes through: Mediterranean Sea
- To: Gela, Italy

General information
- Type: natural gas
- Partners: Eni, National Oil Corporation
- Operator: Agip Gas BV
- Commissioned: 2004

Technical information
- Length: 520 km (320 mi)
- Maximum discharge: 11 billion cubic meters per year

The Greenstream pipeline, part of the Western Libyan Gas Project, is a natural gas submarine pipeline running from western Libya to the island of Sicily in Italy.

== History ==
The idea of natural gas from Libya to Italy originating from the 1970s. Feasibility studies were carried out in the 1980s and 1990s. Construction of the pipeline started in 2003. The pipeline's main contractor was Saipem, that used for pipeline laying the Castoro Sei and Crawler vessels. The shore approach and landfall works were done by Boskalis Offshore.

The supplies started on 1 October 2004 and the pipeline was inaugurated on 7 October 2004 by Silvio Berlusconi and Muammar Gaddafi.

== Technical features ==
The Greenstream pipeline is 540 kilometres (340 mi) long and it runs from Mellitah in Libya to Gela, in Sicily, Italy. It is located in water depths exceeding 1,100 metres (3,600 ft). It includes also the Mellitah compressor station and the Gela reception terminal. The pipeline is supplied from the Bahr Essalam offshore field, Bouri Field and Wafa field near Algerian border, 530 kilometres (330 mi) from Mellitah. The construction cost US$6.6 billion. The pipeline has a diameter of 32 inches (810 mm) and an initial capacity of 8 billion cubic meters (bcm) of natural gas per year. Later the capacity was increased to 11 bcm.

== Ownership ==
The pipeline is constructed and owned by Agip Gas BV, a joint venture of the Italian energy company Eni and the National Oil Corporation (NOC) of Libya.

== See also ==
- Trans-Mediterranean Pipeline
- GALSI
- Medgaz
- Maghreb–Europe Gas Pipeline
- Trans-Saharan gas pipeline
