= Algeria–Morocco relations =

- Algeria: Morocco

Algeria–Morocco relations are the bilateral diplomatic relations between Algeria and Morocco.

Algeria is represented in Morocco by its embassy in Rabat; Algeria also has consulates in Casablanca and Oujda. Morocco is represented in Algeria by an embassy in Algiers; it also has consulates in Algiers, Oran and Sidi Bel Abbès. Relations between the two North African states have been marred by several crises since their independence, particularly the 1963 Sand War, the Western Sahara War of 1975–1991, the closing of the Algeria–Morocco border in 1994, an ongoing disagreement over the political status of Western Sahara and the signing of the Israel–Morocco normalization agreement (as part of the Abraham Accords) in 2020.

On 24 August 2021, Algeria severed ties with Morocco, accusing Morocco of supporting the separatist Movement for the Self-Determination of Kabylia, allegedly in retaliation for Algeria's historical support of the Sahrawi Republic independence in the Western Sahara. In March 2023, Algerian President Abdelmadjid Tebboune stated that the relations between two countries had reached a "point of no return due to Morocco's continued provocation of Algeria".

== Historical relations ==
Morocco was involved in the French conquest of Algeria that started in 1830. Initially Morocco supported the Algerian resistance groups against France but ceased in 1844 following the French bombardment of Tangier and the Battle of Isly. France and Morocco then agreed on a border till the Atlas Mountains which remained when Morocco was turned into a French and Spanish protectorate, leaving the border south of it unknown. In 1912, the border between the French Protectorate of Morocco and French Algeria was extended further south with the Varnier Line.

=== Post-colonization and the Sand War ===
After Morocco had gained independence from France in 1956, King Mohammed V provided arms, money, and medicines to Algerian FLN forces waging a war of independence against French rule; Morocco also served as a rear base for Algerian insurgents to set up training camps for newer recruits. During this period, King Mohammed also refused to negotiate with France over the precise outline of the Algeria-Morocco border in the Sahara Desert that had not yet been demarcated earlier in 1844 or with the Varnier Line in 1912. This was further complicated by the popularity of reinstating the border of Greater Morocco among Moroccan politicians among whom Allal El Fassi, then president of the Istiqlal Party. These borders encompass the entirety of Mauritania, parts of Mali and Algeria.

On 23 January 1962 King Hassan II of Morocco reported that the Moroccan-Algerian commission at the ministerial level finalized a structure for a United Arab Maghreb.

After Algerian independence, the border disputes remained leading to skirmishes along the Algerian-Moroccan border and the eventual outbreak of the Sand War in 1963. The dispute revolved around Morocco claiming the region surrounding Tindouf. After two months of fighting, Algeria and Morocco agreed to a ceasefire agreed upon on 29 and 30 October 1963 in Bamako, Mali. The two main points entails that the pre-war border would remain and that the border area would be demilitarized guaranteed by Ethiopian and Malian supervisors. However, Morocco kept pushing for its demand to hold a referendum in the villages of Hassi-Beida and Tindjoub whether these would want to join Morocco or remain in Algeria. The day of the official ceasefire to the Sand War on 1 November, Algerian President Ahmed Ben Bella demanded the evacuation of Moroccan armed forces from Hassi-Beida and Tindjoub. The Moroccan soldiers refused which was met by a bombardment of Figuig in Morocco by Algeria. After a second ceasefire on 20 February 1964, Moroccan troops retreated Hassi-Beida and Tindjoub as did the Algerian forces from Figuig.

=== Treaty of Ifrane ===
The Treaty of Ifrane, signed in January 1969 between Algerian President Houari Boumédiène and King Hassan II of Morocco, marked a significant diplomatic effort to address territorial and border disputes following the 1963 Sand War. Negotiated in the Moroccan city of Ifrane, the treaty sought to establish a framework for bilateral cooperation, including:

- Border delineation and management of shared resources
- Economic and cultural exchanges, with aspirations for regional stability
- Conflict resolution mechanisms, endorsed by international observers

While the treaty symbolised a commitment to peaceful diplomacy, its long-term effectiveness was limited by unresolved territorial claims, particularly in the Tindouf and Béchar regions. Scholars note that it reflected Cold War-era dynamics, with Algeria aligning with socialist bloc policies and Morocco maintaining Western-backed monarchist governance.

Despite periodic tensions, the treaty remains a reference point in Algeria–Morocco relations, though subsequent disputes have overshadowed its initial goals.

== Western Sahara ==
The territory of the former colony of Western Sahara territory has caused a deep-seated antagonism and general mistrust between Algeria and Morocco that has permeated all aspects of Moroccan-Algerian relations. After Spain announced its intention to abandon the territory in 1975, relations between Morocco and Algeria, both of which had previously presented a united front, disintegrated. Algeria, although not asserting any territorial claims of its own, was averse to the absorption of the territory by any of its neighbors and supported the Polisario Front's wish to create an independent nation in the territory. Before the Spanish evacuation, the Spanish government had agreed to divide the territory, transferring the majority of the land to Morocco and the remainder to Mauritania. This agreement violated a United Nations (UN) resolution that declared all historical claims by Mauritania or Morocco to be insufficient to justify territorial absorption and drew heavy criticism from Algeria.

Guerrilla movements inside the Saharan territory, particularly the Polisario Front (Frente Popular para la Liberación de Saguia el Hamra y Río de Oro), having fought for Saharan independence since 1973, immediately proclaimed the Sahrawi Arab Democratic Republic (SADR). Algeria recognized this new self-proclaimed state in 1976, and has since pursued a determined diplomatic effort for international recognition of the territory; it has also supplied food, materials, and training to the guerrillas. In 1979, after many years of extensive and fierce guerrilla warfare, Mauritania abandoned its territorial claims and withdrew. Morocco quickly claimed the territory relinquished by Mauritania. Once the SADR gained diplomatic recognition from the Organization of African Unity (OAU) and many other independent states, Morocco came under international pressure. As a result, the Moroccan government finally proposed a national referendum to determine the Saharan territory's sovereignty in 1981. The referendum was to be overseen by the OAU, but the proposal was quickly retracted by the King of Morocco when the OAU could not reach agreement over referendum procedures. In 1987 the Moroccan government again agreed to recognize the Polisario and to meet to "discuss their grievances." Algeria stipulated a solitary precondition for restoration of diplomatic relations—recognition of the Polisario and talks toward a definitive solution to the Western Saharan quagmire. Without a firm commitment from the King of Morocco, Algeria conceded and resumed diplomatic relations with Morocco in 1988.

== Border ==
In 1994, Morocco accused the Algerian Secret Service of being behind the Marrakesh attack of 1994, where two Spaniards were killed, and imposed visa requirement on Algerians and nationals of Algerian origin. The immediate response by the Algerian government was the closure of the border with Morocco. The borders are still closed, costing both countries an estimated 2% of their annual growth rate. In 1999, the newly elected Algerian president Abdelaziz Bouteflika attended Hassan II of Morocco's funeral, and declared three days of official mourning in Algeria. That same year, Bouteflika accused Morocco of hosting GIA bases, from which some attacks on Algerians were planned and directed. A few days later, he again accused Morocco of exporting drugs into Algeria. In July 2004, King Mohammed VI abolished visa requirements for Algerians entering Morocco; in April 2006, President Bouteflika reciprocated the gesture. In 2012 Algerian prime minister Ahmed Ouyahia said border reopening was not a priority for his government. Other official declarations imply that this issue is not to be solved soon.

By 2014, an increased number of voices from civil society and intellectuals had asked their respective countries to take steps to reconciliation.

== 2020s relations ==
In 2021, the Algerian authorities have accused Morocco of having killed, in a "barbaric bombardment", three truck drivers who were covering the route between the Mauritanian capital, Nouakchott, and the Algerian city of Ouargla, and have warned that this "will not go unpunished". According to the same source, the event took place on 1 November when the victims were making a commercial trip between the countries in the area. "Several factors indicate that the Moroccan occupation forces in the Western Sahara carried out this cowardly assassination with sophisticated weaponry", it added.

Amid the deterioration of relations with Morocco, Algeria decided not to renew the contract of the Maghreb–Europe Gas Pipeline (GME), which expired at midnight on 31 October 2021. Since 1 November, Algerian natural gas exports to Spain and Portugal are primarily transported through the Medgaz pipeline (with the short-term possibility of covering further demand either by expanding the Medgaz or by shipping LNG).

In September 2024, Algeria imposed visas on Moroccans and accused Morocco of engaging in "various actions that threaten Algeria's stability", including "Zionist espionage" and "drug and human trafficking".

== Diplomatic missions and official visits ==
- Algeria maintains an embassy in Rabat, the capital of Morocco.
- Morocco maintains an embassy in Algiers, the capital of Algeria.

=== High level visits ===
- President Abdelaziz Bouteflika's visit to Morocco (May 2000)
- President Bouteflika's visit to Morocco (September 2005)
- King Mohammed VI's visit to Algeria (March 2005)
- President Bouteflika's visit to Morocco (March 2006)
- King Mohammed VI's visit to Algeria (February 2012)
- President Bouteflika's visit to Morocco (December 2012)

=== Break of diplomatic relations ===
Algeria was opposed to the normalization agreement between Morocco and Israel in December 2020. In July 2021, Amnesty International and Forbidden Stories reported that Morocco had targeted more than 6,000 Algerian phones, including those of politicians and high-ranking military officials, with the Israeli Pegasus spyware. In August 2021, Algeria blamed Morocco and Israel of supporting the Movement for the self-determination of Kabylia, which the Algerian President Abdelmadjid Tebboune accused of being involved in the wildfires in northern Algeria. Tebboune accused Morocco of perpetrating hostile acts. In the same month, King Mohammed VI of Morocco reached out for reconciliation with Algeria and offered assistance in Algeria's battle against the fires. Algeria did not respond to the offer.

On 18 August 2021, Tebboune chaired an extraordinary meeting of the High Council of Security to review Algeria's relations to Morocco. The president ordered an intensification of security controls at the borders. On 24 August 2021, Algerian foreign minister Ramtane Lamamra announced the break of diplomatic relations with Morocco. On 27 August 2021, Morocco closed the country's embassy in Algiers, Algeria. Furthermore, on 22 September 2021, Algeria's Supreme Security Council determined to close its airspace to all Moroccan civilian and military aircraft.

On 30 July 2022, during a speech on the 22nd anniversary of his accession to the throne, Mohammed VI called for a renewal of normal relations with Algeria. On 27 September 2022, Algerian Minister of Justice Abderrachid Tabi met with Moroccan Foreign Minister Nasser Bourita in Rabat to hand over Abdelmadjid Tebboune's invitation to the Arab League Summit in Algiers on 1 November 2022 for Mohammed VI. It was the first official visit since the break of diplomatic relations. On 8 September 2023, Algeria opened its airspace to Morocco for the first time since 2021 to facilitate the arrival of humanitarian aid after the 2023 Marrakesh-Safi earthquake.

== Cultural relations ==
The cultural relationship between Morocco and Algeria has a rich history that spans centuries. These neighboring countries share numerous cultural, linguistic, and historical ties that have shaped their interactions over time. While political tensions and disputes have sometimes strained their relations, the cultural bond between Morocco and Algeria has remained resilient.

=== Language ===
Language plays a significant role in the cultural connection between Morocco and Algeria. Both countries share the Arabic language, with the Maghrebi dialect being spoken in various regions. The dialects in each country have their unique nuances and accents, yet they exhibit similarities that enable effective communication and cultural exchange. Furthermore, the Berber language, specifically the Tamazight dialects, is spoken by significant populations in both nations, but the exact population of speakers has been difficult to ascertain due to lack of official recognition.

=== Cuisine ===
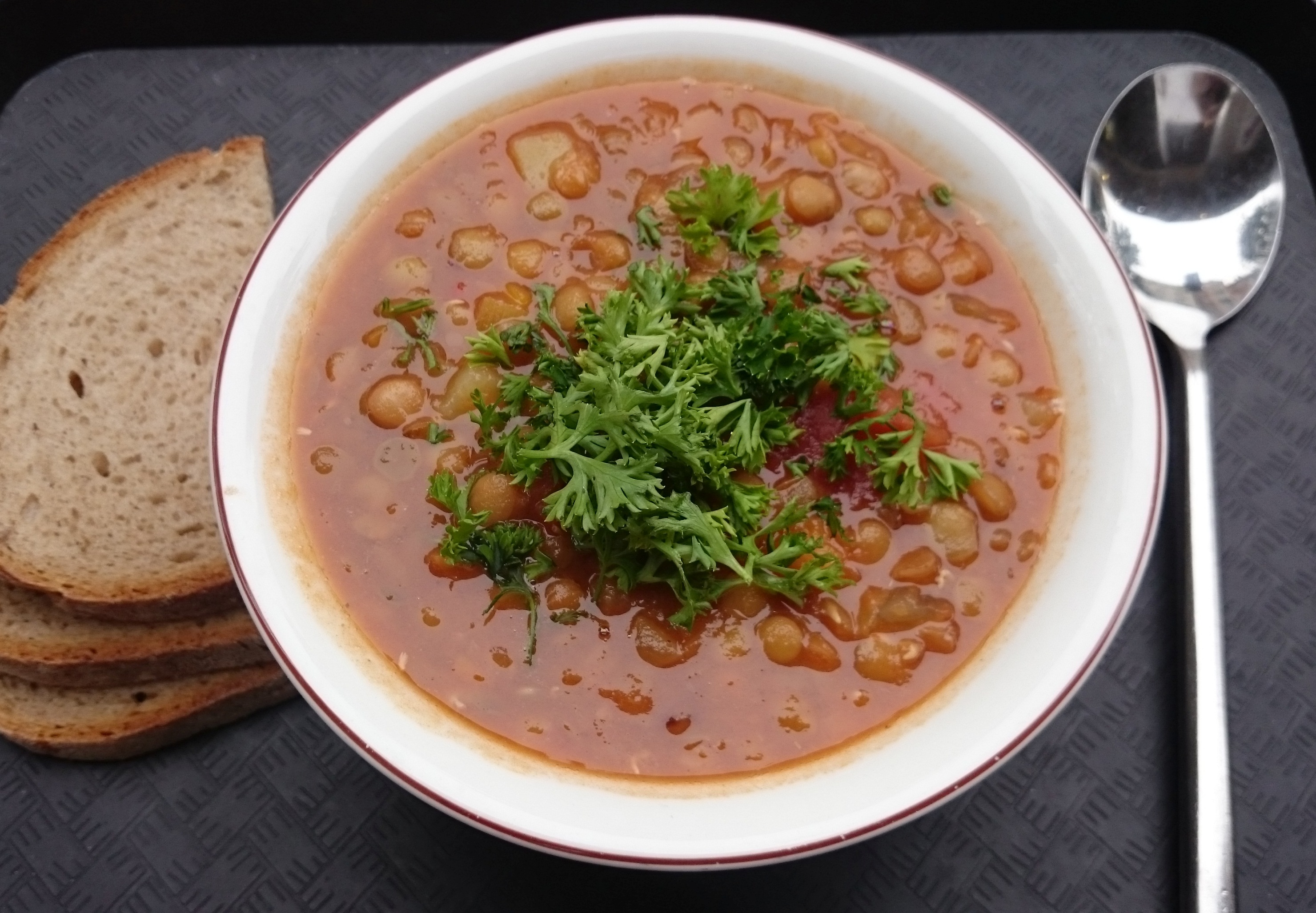
Harira soup

Cuisine is another aspect that showcases the cultural similarities between Morocco and Algeria. Both nations boast a rich gastronomic heritage, characterized by the use of aromatic spices, flavorful herbs, and diverse ingredients. Staple dishes like couscous, tajine, pastilla, and harira are enjoyed on both sides of the border, albeit with regional variations.

=== Religion ===
The Hassan II Mosque in Casablanca.

Islam, the predominant religion in both countries, influences various aspects of daily life, social norms, and festivals. Religious observances, such as Ramadan, Eid al-Fitr, and Eid al-Adha, are celebrated with fervor and create opportunities for communal gatherings. These religious festivities serve as occasions for both Moroccans and Algerians to come together, celebrate, and reinforce their cultural bonds. Both countries have penalties for publicly eating, drinking or smoking during Ramadan which can result in fines, community service or even jail time. The countries of Kuwait, Saudi Arabia, Malaysia and United Arab Emirates have similar laws.

== See also ==
- Israel–Morocco normalization agreement
- Expulsion of Moroccans from Algeria
- Sand war
- Algeria-Morocco border
