= African Atlantic Gas Pipeline =

Planned gas pipeline in West Africa

Location
- Country: Nigeria, Morocco
- Direction: Northward (from Nigeria to Morocco and European markets)
- Start: Brass Island, Nigeria
- Passes through: Benin, Togo, Ghana, Ivory Coast, Liberia, Sierra Leone, Guinea, Guinea-Bissau, Gambia, Senegal, Mauritania (with branches to Mali, Burkina Faso, and Niger)
- To: Ouezzane Province, Morocco (Maghreb-Europe Gas Pipeline connection)
- Runs alongside: Trans-Saharan Gas Pipeline (TSGP)

General information
- Type: Natural gas
- Partners: ECOWAS
- Operator: Joint venture between NNPC and ONHYM
- Commissioned: 2031 (First gas from initial phases)

Technical information
- Length: 6,900 km (4,300 mi)
- Maximum discharge: 30 billion cubic metres annually

The African Atlantic Gas Pipeline (AAGP), also known as Nigeria–Morocco Gas Pipeline (NMGP), is a planned 6,900 kilometre natural gas pipeline intended to transport gas from Nigeria to West African coastal countries and, via Morocco, onward to European markets. With an annual capacity of 30 billion cubic metres, it is also intended to supply landlocked Sahel countries. Costs are estimated at US$25 billion. The project is to be completed in stages.

Upon completion, the AAGP will be the world's longest offshore pipeline and second longest pipeline overall.

== Overview ==
For both Nigeria and Morocco, the AAGP fits into larger strategic ambitions. Nigeria has declared plans to become Africa's leading gas economy, including pipeline infrastructure for increased exports to Europe, while Morocco aims to expand its influence along the Atlantic coast. For the European Union, the AAGP could, in the long term, provide an alternative to Russian gas imports following Russia's invasion of Ukraine in February 2022.

The project is intended to increase regional economic integration and electricity access in West Africa, including through dedicated land routes to AES states Mali, Burkina Faso and Niger. Initial project segments will connect Morocco to gas fields in Mauritania and Senegal, and link Ghana to Ivory Coast. First gas from the initial phases is expected in 2031. Each segment is designed as a standalone system, meaning the AAGP does not rely on a single final investment decision.

The project must also be seen within the context of the Algerian-Moroccan rivalry. For one, the AAGP is in competition with an Algerian-backed planned gas pipeline connecting Nigeria to Europe, the Trans-Saharan Gas Pipeline (TSGP). Although the TSGP is a shorter route and could be completed sooner, unlike the TSGP, the AAGP's route avoids the precarious security situation of the Sahel. Secondly, the AAGP's success depends on a resolution of the Western Sahara conflict, where the two countries are on opposing sides. Morocco is seeking international support for its Western Sahara Autonomy Proposal, which proposes autonomy under Moroccan sovereignty, while Algeria backs the Polisario Front, who fight for an independent Western Sahara.

== Route ==
The pipeline will run off the African Atlantic coast for 5,600 kilometres from Brass Island, Nigeria to Dakhla in Moroccan-controlled Western Sahara. Including the supply branches to the countries through whose waters it passes, the total length of the pipeline is 6,900 kilometres. In Dakhla, the AAGP will link up with the planned "Atlantic Dorsal" pipeline, which will connect to the Maghreb–Europe Gas Pipeline. The AAGP will also connect to the existing West African Gas Pipeline, which already links Nigeria to Benin, Togo and Ghana. The extension will benefit nine other countries: Ivory Coast, Liberia, Sierra Leone, Guinea, Guinea-Bissau, Gambia, Senegal, Mauritania and Morocco.

== History ==
Concrete plans for the AAGP were first made in 2016 during a state visit of Moroccan King Mohammed VI to Nigeria. The Nigerian National Petroleum Corporation (NNPC) and the Moroccan National Office of Hydrocarbons and Mines (ONHYM) were charged with developing the project and launched a feasibility study in 2017, which was completed by 2019. A front-end engineering & design (FEED) contract was then awarded to British company Penspen. A second-phase FEED contract was awarded to Worley in 2022.

The project was presented to the Economic Community of West African States (ECOWAS) in 2019, and a memorandum of understanding between NNPC, OHNYM and ECOWAS was signed in September 2022.

The project became more urgent for Morocco when gas exports from Algeria to Morocco via the Maghreb–Europe Gas Pipeline ceased after the two countries broke diplomatic relations in 2021.

In January 2025, Chinese steelmaker Jingye Group was contracted to provide steel pipes.

An intergovernmental agreement on the project was signed at an ECOWAS summit in Freetown, Sierra Leone in July 2026. Following this, a high authority for the pipeline will be established in Nigeria, bringing together ministerial representatives from each of the participating countries, and a project company will be created in Morocco as a joint venture between ONHYM and NNPC to lead the execution, financing and construction phase.

== Funding ==
The United Arab Emirates, the European Investment Bank, the Islamic Development Bank and the OPEC Fund for International Development have agreed to contribute, Moroccan energy minister Leila Benali announced in May 2026.

In May 2026, OHNYM officials travelled to the United States seeking funding from US institutions, including the U.S. International Development Finance Corporation. The US expressed interest, according to Nigeria's Finance Minister Wale Edun.

== Construction ==
The first phase of construction will see the extension of the West African Gas Pipeline (WAGP) from Takoradi (Ghana) to San-Pédro (Ivory Coast) as well as a link between Kayar (Senegal) and Morocco. In the second phase, the Brass producing area in Nigeria's gas-rich Bayelsa State will be linked to the WAGP. The third phase will connect San-Pédro to Kayar.

The pipeline's route through Morocco spans 2,220 kilometres, divided into an 1,830 km onshore section and a 390 km offshore segment. Designed with a 48-inch diameter to accommodate future volume increases, the Moroccan infrastructure includes:

- Offshore segment: The maritime section at Dakhla-Oued Ed-Dahab runs through waters at depths between 15 and 100 metres. For the 8 km closest to the shore, the pipeline will be buried and reinforced with concrete, anti-corrosion coatings, and cathodic protection. The system has a projected 40-year operational lifespan.
- Receiving stations: Two key terminals will handle gas distribution. The first will be south of Dakhla and will serve as the intake point for offshore gas arriving from Nigeria. The second sits at Ouezzane Province, connecting directly to the Maghreb-Europe Gas Pipeline to enable exports to Europe.
- Compression stations: Four stations will be built along the land route at the Provinces of Boujdour, Tan-Tan, Chtouka-Ait Baha, and Safi to maintain steady pipeline pressure. Spaced 300 to 320 km apart, each facility will cover roughly 64 hectares near existing ports and transport links.
