= Sharif Hikmat Nashashibi =

Arab journalist

Sharif Hikmat Nashashibi is a London-based journalist, analyst on Arab affairs, and co-founder and chairman of Arab Media Watch, a media watchdog organization that monitors and responds to British media coverage of the Arab world.

== Biography ==
Sharif Hikmat Nashashibi was born in Kuwait to a Palestinian-Jordanian-Lebanese Muslim father and an Iraqi-Syrian mother. He attended City University in London, England where he studied international journalism and took interest in the way the media reported the Arab world while studying for a master's degree in international journalism.

In March 2000, Nashashibi was a signer of a letter from Palestinian intellectuals who insisted that the people of Israel fully withdraw - including from Jerusalem, and permit the return of Palestinian refugees. In October 2001, about a month after the September 11 attacks by the Islamic terrorist group al-Qaeda upon the United States, Nashashibi noted how Palestinians supported Osama bin Laden's call for justice concerning their plight and how, unless Palestinians' plight is justly addressed, "the likes of bin Laden will continue to find favour." In 2008, Nashashibi received a "Breakaway Award," awarded to promising new journalists, from the Next Century Foundation's International Council for Press and Broadcasting. The award recognises achievements in balanced reporting on the Middle East.

Nashashibi's work includes writings and publications, interviews on television and radio, and invited speaking and debating at universities and colleges. He has worked and trained with many organisations such as Dow Jones Newswires, Reuters, the UN Development Programme in Palestine, the Middle East Broadcasting Centre, and the Middle East Economic Survey in Cyprus.

== Selected publications ==
- Sharif Nashashibi (18 September 2001), "How far will Blair's tough talk apply to Irish terrorism?", Daily Telegraph
- Sharif Nashashibi (14 November 2008), "How US claims about Syria became media facts.", The Guardian
- Sharif Nashashibi (30 December 2013), "For Arabs, a bad 2013 leaves little hope for 2014", Yemen Times (published 2 January 2014)

== See also ==
- Nashashibi, name of a prominent Palestinian family based in Jerusalem
