= Hassi R'Mel gas field =

Largest gas field in Algeria and one of the largest in the world

Hassi R'Mel
- Location within Algeria
- Country: Algeria
- Region: Laghouat Province
- Location: Hassi R'Mel
- Offshore/onshore: onshore
- Coordinates: 32°56′50″N 3°10′14″E
- Operator: Sonatrach

Field history
- Discovery: 1956
- Start of production: 1961

Production
- Estimated gas in place: 3,000×10^{9} m^{3} (110×10^{12} cu ft)
- Recoverable gas: 2,415×10^{9} m^{3} (85.3×10^{12} cu ft)

The Hassi R'Mel Gas Field is the largest gas field in Algeria and one of the largest gas fields in the world. It is located in the vicinity of Hassi R'Mel village, 550 kilometres (340 mi) south of Algiers. The gas field extends 70 kilometres (43 mi) from north to south and 50 kilometres (31 mi) from east to west.

The gas field was discovered in 1956 along with the giant oilfield of Hassi Messaoud. Production started in 1961. Its recoverable reserves have been estimated at 2.415 trillion cubic meter of natural gas, and probable reserves at 2.7-3 trillion cubic meter. The annual producing capacity is around 100 billion cubic meter of natural gas. The field produces from a Triassic formation. An adjacent field is estimated to contain between 3.5—12 trillion cubic feet of gas.

Natural gas from the Hassi R'Mel gas field is transported to coastal cities of Arzew, Algiers, and Skikda. It supplies export pipelines such as the Maghreb-Europe, Trans-Mediterranean, Medgaz and Galsi pipelines to Southern Europe.

== Geology ==
The Hassi er R'Mel is a Triassic gas field discovered in 1956 with the HR-1 well and located in a Cretaceous anticline of the M'zab dorsal structure separating the Western Org Paleozoic basin to the west and the Oued Mya basin to the east. Cambrian rhyolite forms the basement which is overlain by the Tassili Cambro-Ordovician sandstone group, a Siluro-Devonian shale and then Mesozoic sediments. The A, B and C reservoir sandstones are Permo-Triassic with a total thickness of about 115 m and sealed by Late Triassic salt and shale.
