= Castoro Sei =

Semi-submersible pipelay vessel

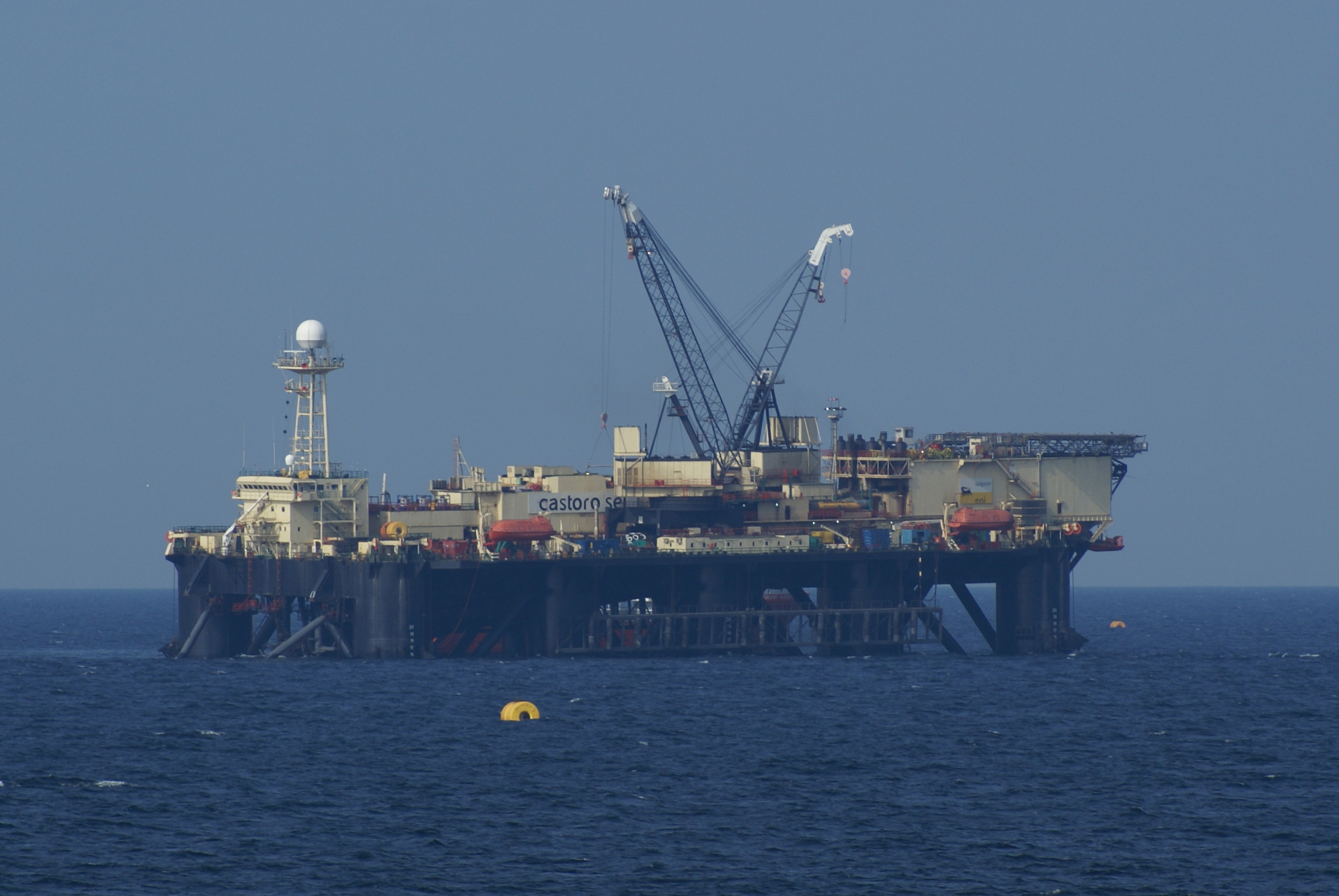
- The Castoro Sei in the Baltic Sea, south-east of Gotland on contract to Nord Stream, March 2011

History
- Name: Castoro Sei
- Owner: Saipem
- Operator: Saipem
- Port of registry: Nassau, Bahamas
- Builder: Fincantieri, Italy
- Yard number: 4334
- Laid down: 20 May 1975
- Completed: 1978
- Identification: Call sign C6DF4; IMO number: 8758603; MMSI number: 308162000
- Fate: Scrapped Aliaga, May 2022

General characteristics
- Tonnage: 31,506 GT
- Length: 152 m (499 ft)
- Beam: 70.5 m (231 ft)
- Draught: 15.5 m (51 ft)
- Depth: 29.8 m (98 ft)
- Speed: 5.8 knots (10.7 km/h; 6.7 mph)
- Crew: 330

The Castoro Sei (Italian for Beaver Six) was a column-stabilized semi-submersible pipelay vessel. She had an overall length of 152 metres (499 ft), a width of 70.5 metres (231 ft) and an operating draught of 7.8 to 15.5 metres (26 to 51 ft).

The Castoro Sei was equipped with 2 rotating gantry cranes of 134 tonnes capacity, three 130 tonnes pipe tensioners and a 400 tonnes abandon and recovery winch for pipelaying. She provided accommodation for 354 people.

The firing line comprises the fixed pipelay ramp, enclosed in the central housing, running along the longitudinal centreline of the vessel. It is connected to an internal and external ramp, both of which have adjustable inclination to facilitate pipelay in varying water depths. A ramp extension unit is available for use in deep water or for severe seabed conditions.

The Castoro Sei was built in 1978 by Fincantieri at Trieste yard, and was owned and operated by Saipem. Her port of registry was Nassau, in the Bahamas.

It has been used for laying a number of pipelines in the Black Sea, North Sea and Mediterranean Sea, including Blue Stream, Greenstream, Medgaz, Trans-Mediterranean, Europipe II, and BBL pipelines. The vessel also laid most of the Nord Stream 1 pipeline in the Baltic Sea.
