= Romano Minozzi =

Italian businessman (born 1935)

Romano Minozzi (born 1935) is an Italian billionaire businessman.

== Biography ==
Romano Minozzi was born in 1935. He holds a degree in economics from the University of Bologna.

Minozzi began his career at a bank in Modena, where he developed an interest in the stock exchange.

In 1961, with a 300-million-lira loan from Mediobanca, he acquired a struggling ceramics company, which he renamed Iris. Iris expanded internationally during Italy's postwar economic growth and manufactures products such as bathroom tiles and wall slabs.

During the early 2000s, Minozzi became interested in the stock market and acquired a minority stake in Mediobanca. He also served a three-year term on Ferrari's board. In 2010, he acquired a 4.2% stake in the Rome-based transmission system operator Terna for $173 million, selling it three years later for approximately $465 million. In 2016, he acquired a 3% stake in Snam for about $660 million and obtained shares in Italgas after its spinoff from Snam.

Minozzi stepped back from the daily management of Iris in December 2017, naming his daughter Federica as CEO. In 2020, he was listed on Forbes' World's Billionaires list.
