= Hassi R'Mel District =

Coordinates: 32.928°N 3.271°E

Hassi R'Mel District دائرة حاسي الرمل
- District
- Map of Algeria highlighting Laghouat Province

- Map of Laghouat Province highlighting Hassi R'Mel District
- Country: Algeria
- Province: Laghouat
- District seat: Hassi R'Mel

Area
  - Total: 5,912 km^{2} (2,283 sq mi)

Population (2008)
  - Total: 33,337
  - Density: 5.639/km^{2} (14.60/sq mi)
- Time zone: UTC+01 (CET)
- Municipalities: 2

Hassi R'Mel is a district in Laghouat Province, Algeria. It was named after its capital, the natural gas extraction town of Hassi R'Mel.

== Municipalities ==
The district is further divided into 2 municipalities

- Hassi R'Mel
- Hassi Delaâ
