= Hassi R'Mel integrated solar combined cycle power station =

Solar power station in Algeria

Coordinates: 33°7′29″N 3°21′7″E

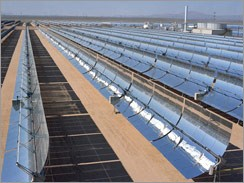
Arrays of parabolic troughs

The Hassi R'Mel integrated solar combined cycle power station is an integrated solar combined cycle (ISCC) power station near Hassi R'Mel in Algeria. The plant combines a 25 MW parabolic trough concentrating solar power array, covering an area of over 180,000 m^{2}, in conjunction with a 130 MW combined cycle gas turbine plant, so cutting carbon emissions compared to a traditional power station. The output from the solar array is used in the steam turbine.

The construction contract was signed on January 5, 2007 and the plant was developed by New Energy Algeria (NEAL), a joint venture between Sonatrach, Sonelgaz, and SIM.

The station began producing electricity in June 2011. It was inaugurated July 14, 2011.

== See also ==
- List of solar thermal power stations
- Solar thermal energy
- Yazd solar thermal power plant
- Solar power in Algeria
