= Hassi Delaa =

Coordinates: 33.41742°N 3.55021°E

- Commune and town
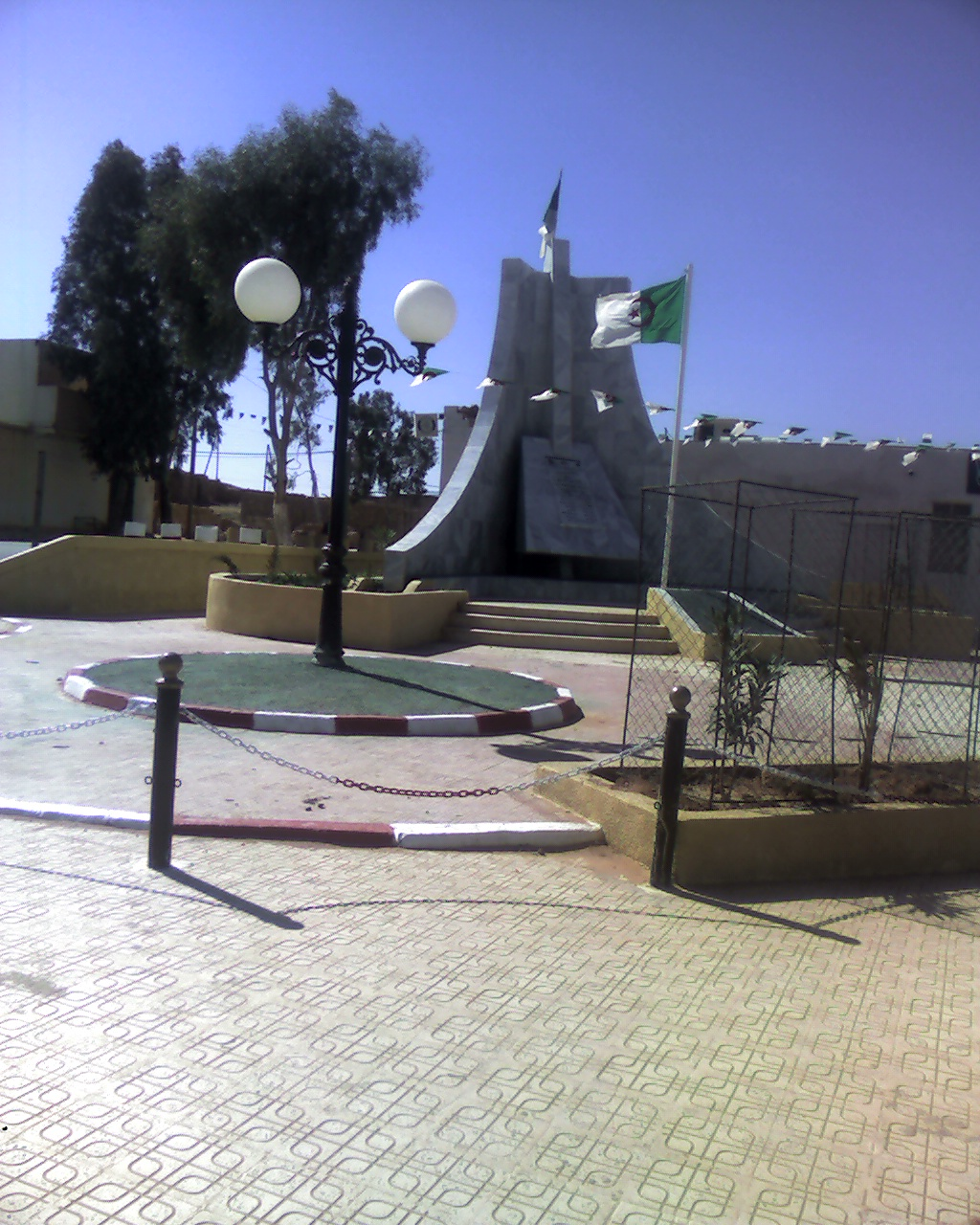

- Country: Algeria
- Province: Laghouat Province
- District: Hassi R'Mel

Area
  - Total: 1,527 sq mi (3,955 km^{2})

Population (2008)
  - Total: 11,204
  - Density: 7.337/sq mi (2.833/km^{2})
- Time zone: UTC+1 (CET)

Hassi Delaa is a town and commune in Laghouat Province, Algeria. According to the 1998 census, it has a population of 6,930.
