= Hassi R'Mel =

Hassi R'Mel Ḥasi Eṛṛmel

- Location of Hassi R'Mel within Algeria
- Coordinates: 32.928°N 3.271°E
- Country: Algeria
- Province: Laghouat
- District: Hassi R'Mel

Area
  - Total: 3,830 km^{2} (1,480 sq mi)

Population (2008)
  - Total: 22,133
  - Density: 5.78/km^{2} (15.0/sq mi)
- Time zone: UTC+1 (West Africa Time)
- Postal code: 03300

Hassi R'Mel (Arabic: حاسي الرمل, Berber language: Ḥasi Eṛṛmel) is a town in Algeria located near the 18th largest gas field worldwide. Hassi R'Mel is located in Laghouat Province 60 kilometres (37 mi) northwest of Ghardaïa. It is the capital of Hassi R'Mel District. Hassi R'Mel has an airport.

Hassi R'Mel is a hub for natural gas and oil pipelines running to coastal cities of Arzew, Algiers, and Skikda. The National Centre For Dispatching Gas is also the starting point for the Maghreb-Europe, Trans-Mediterranean, Medgaz and Galsi gas export pipelines supplying Southern Europe. The town is the planned final destination of the Trans-Saharan gas pipeline.

Hassi R'Mel is also home to an integrated solar combined cycle power station, the first of its kind in Algeria.

== Geology ==
The Hassi R'Mel gas field is a Triassic gas field discovered in 1956 with the HR-1 well and located in a Cretaceous anticline of the M'zab dorsal structure separating the Western Org Paleozoic basin to the west and the Oued Mya basin to the east. Cambrian rhyolite forms the basement which is overlain by the Tassili Cambro-Ordovician sandstone group, a Siluro-Devonian shale and then Mesozoic sediments. The A, B and C reservoir sandstones are Permo-Triassic with a total thickness of about 115 m and sealed by Late Triassic salt and shale.
