= Maghreb–Europe Gas Pipeline =

Natural gas pipeline linking Africa and Europe

- Location of Maghreb–Europe Gas Pipeline (in yellow)

Location
- Country: Algeria, Morocco, Spain, Portugal
- Direction: south-north
- Start: Hassi R'Mel, Algeria
- Passes through: Morocco; Mediterranean Sea
- To: Cordoba, Spain

General information
- Type: natural gas
- Partners: Sonatrach, Kingdom of Morocco, Enagás, Transgas
- Operator: Sonatrach, Metragaz, Enagás, Transgas
- Commissioned: 1 November 1996

Technical information
- Length: 1,620 km (1,010 mi)
- Maximum discharge: 12 billion cubic meters per year (not in operation from 2021)

The Maghreb–Europe Gas Pipeline (MEG; also known as the Pere Duran Farell pipeline or Gazoduc Maghreb Europe – GME) is a natural gas pipeline, which links the Hassi R'Mel gas field in Algeria through Morocco with Cordoba in Andalusia, Spain, where it is connected with the Spanish and Portuguese gas grids. Before the operation of the pipeline ceased in October 2021, it used to supply mainly Spain and Portugal, as well as Morocco with natural gas. In June 2022, a portion of the pipeline was reversed to export gas from Spain to Morocco.

== History ==
The Maghreb–Europe Gas Pipeline was first proposed in 1963 by French companies. This proposal foresaw prolongation of the pipeline to Strasbourg in France. However, because of the Western Sahara dispute, any route from Algeria through Morocco to Spain was prevented. Also natural gas consumption in Spain was too low to justify the pipeline construction.

The project started in early 1990s. In 1992, ministers of Spain and Algeria agreed to start the construction of the pipeline. At the same time Sonatrach and Enagás signed a long-term supply agreement. It followed by signing the Moroccan Convention establishing the procedures for the construction, operation and use of the pipeline. At the same year, the project company Europe - Maghreb Pipeline Ltd. was established. In 1994, Transgas of Portugal) joined the project. Construction started on 11 October 1994.

The pipeline came on stream on 1 November 1996 and it was commissioned on 9 November 1996. The Spanish section was inaugurated in Cordoba on 9 December 1996. The Portuguese section was inaugurated on 27 February 1997. In 2000, the pipeline was named after Pedro or Pere Duran Farell.

Following the breakdown of diplomatic relations between Algeria and Morocco in August 2021, Algeria decided not to renew the 25-year MGE operation contract, which expired at midnight on 31 October 2021, opting instead to supply Spain through the Medgaz pipeline.

Beginning in June 2022, a portion of the pipeline was reversed for gas exports from Spain to Morocco.

A link to the African Atlantic Gas Pipeline is planned in Morocco's Ouezzane Province.

== Technical description ==
The pipeline is 1,620 kilometres (1,010 mi) long and it cost US$2.3 billion. It was built by Bechtel and Saipem. The pipeline consists of five sections. The pipeline's Algerian, Moroccan and Andalusian sections are 48 inches (1,200 mm) in diameter; the link to Portugal through Extremadura is 28 inches (710 mm)/32 inches (810 mm) in diameter; and the underwater sections consist of two 22-inch (560 mm) lines.

An initial capacity of the pipeline was 8.6 billion cubic meters (bcm) of natural gas per year, which was later expanded to 12 bcm.

== Route and operators ==
The Algerian section of pipeline, 515 kilometres (320 mi) long, runs from the Hassi R'mel field in Algeria to the Moroccan border. It is owned and operated by the Algerian national state-owned oil company, Sonatrach. The 522 kilometres (324 mi) long Moroccan section is owned by the Moroccan State and operated by Metragaz, a joint venture of Sagane (a subsidiary of Spanish Gas Natural), Transgas (Portugal), and SNPP (Morocco). The length of the offshore section crossing the Strait of Gibraltar is 45 kilometres (28 mi); it is owned jointly by Enagás (Spain), Transgas, and the Moroccan state. The length of the Andalusian section is 269 kilometres (167 mi), and the Portuguese section 269 kilometres (167 mi) (in addition, there are 270 kilometres (170 mi) of pipeline in the autonomous community of Extremadura).

== See also ==
- Medgaz
- Trans-Mediterranean Pipeline
- GALSI
- Trans-Saharan gas pipeline
- Strait of Gibraltar crossing – Planned Europe-Africa fixed link
