= Rhourde El Baguel oil field =

Oilfield in Ouargla Province, Algeria

Rhourde El Baguel Oil Field
- Country: Algeria
- Region: Ouargla Province
- Location: Rhourde El Baguel
- Offshore/onshore: onshore
- Operators: BP 30% - Sonatrach 70%
- Partners: Sonatrach-BP

Field history
- Discovery: 1963
- Start of development: 1996
- Start of production: 1963
- Peak year: 1995

Production
- Current production of oil: 20,000 barrels per day (~10.0×10^{5} t/a)
- Estimated oil in place: 410 million tonnes (~ 500×10^{6} m^{3} or 3000 million bbl)

Rhourde El Baguel Oil Field (REB) is an oil field located in Ouargla Province, Algeria. It was discovered in 1963 by Edward Chittick under Sinclair International and developed by ARCO (now part of BP) and Sonatrach in 1996. API oil (40.2 Deg) is produced from a Cambrian formation at a depth of 9,850 feet (3,000 m).

It is the second largest field in Algeria. REB's recovery rate declined to 18% of its maximum by 1995. In 1996, it was producing less than 25,000 barrels per day. On February 15, 1996, ARCO signed a 25-year production sharing contract (PSC) valued at $1.3 billion with Algeria. In 1995 it paid a signature bonus of $225m and agreed to pay a $300m entrance fee. It was to invest in an enhanced oil recovery system and further development, including 38 new wells, but this work did not take place.

After acquiring ARCO, BP raised the field's output by gas injection to 85,000 b/d peak for a few months in early 2000. Encouraged by this success, BP decided to increase the pressure of the injected gas to optimize the production. This led to a total failure and cracks inside the field. Its sustainable capacity was never more than 18,000 b/d. As of 2011, production averaged 20,000 b/d. The EOR technique failed due to the existence of cracks in the bottom well rock formation that led to the loss of the majority of the oil reserves.

BP and Sonatrach are going through arbitration over the objectives that were initially set in the PSC and never met by BP.

The total proven reserves of field are around 3 billion barrels (410 million tonnes).
