= Brass Island =

Island in Nigeria

Coordinates: 4.3169444°N 6.2427778°E

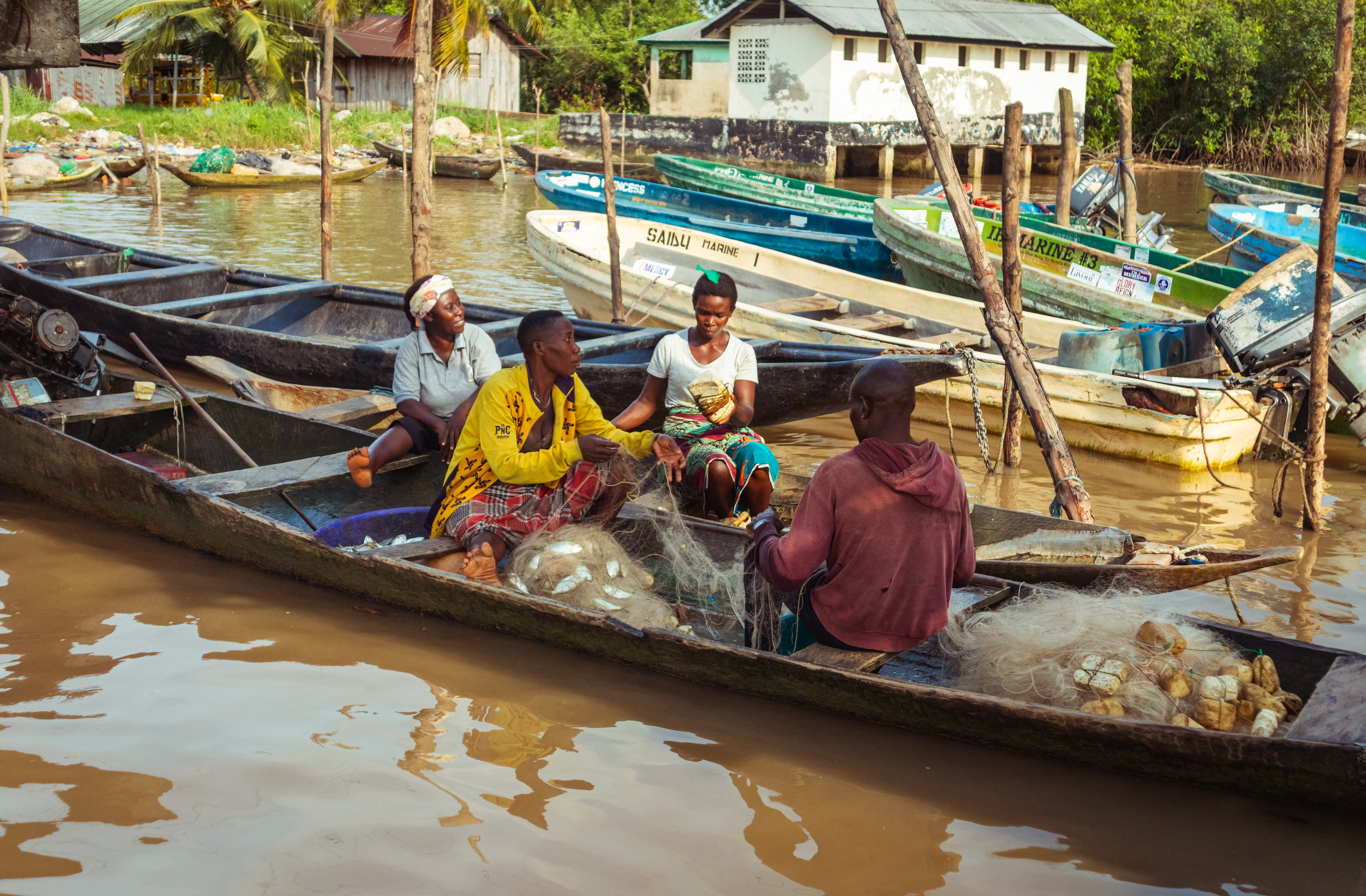
Fishing on Brass island

Brass Island is an island in the Niger Delta of Nigeria. It is the site of Twon-Brass, the head of the Brass, Nigeria local government area in southern Bayelsa State.

It is known for the traditional costume of its inhabitants, heavily influenced by British colonialist's Edwardian era outfits. Ferries link the town with Port Harcourt and Yenagoa.
