= Expulsion of Moroccans from Algeria =

Forced exodus of Moroccans

- Part of the Western Sahara War
- Map showing locations of Algeria and Morocco.
- Date: 18 December 1975 (50 years ago)
- Type: mass deportation
- Organized by: Government of Algeria
- Outcome: 45,000 Moroccan families expelled

On 18 December 1975, the first day of Eid al-Adha, the Algerian president Houari Boumediene ordered the expulsion of all Moroccan nationals from Algeria, resulting in the exodus of 45,000 Moroccan families, or by some accounts 350,000 people in total. Although, according to some modern sources, between 10,000 to 30,000 were expelled and 5,000 Moroccans were granted Algerian nationality. The expulsion was a response to the Madrid Accords (which did not include the consultation of Algeria nor the POLISARIO movement) and the earlier Green March in the Western Sahara.

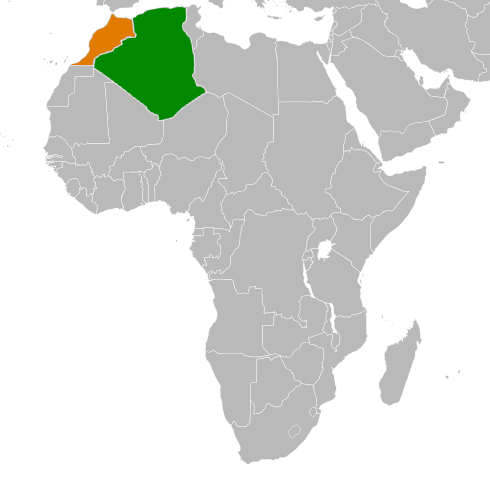
In this image, Algeria is shown in green, while Morocco is coloured orange.

The exodus, code-named by the Algerian government as the "Black March", was carried out by Abdelaziz Bouteflika, then the foreign minister of Algeria at the time.

45,000 families were estimated to have been expelled; a large portion of them had lived in Algeria for decades or even centuries. Most Moroccans had lived wealthy lifestyles and were in good conditions prior to the expulsion. Many families were separated; Moroccans who had married Algerians were not deported but their family members usually were. Many Moroccans have not yet been reunited with their families.

== Commemoration ==
In 2019, the Moroccan military posted a video on Facebook depicting the testimonies of Moroccan refugees, calling for an apology from Algeria. The video was also a response to the Algerian Government's demands for Morocco to apologize for Algerians it left stranded after a 1994 terrorist attack in Asni, Marrakesh.

The Moroccan Organization for Human Rights (ODHM) has also called for the United Nations to investigate the expulsion.

In July 2014, the Moroccan Foreign Ministry brought the topic up again, urging Algeria to conduct a re-examination of the exodus.

== See also ==
- Human rights in Algeria
