= Trans-Saharan gas pipeline =

Natural gas pipeline from Nigeria to Algeria

- Location of Trans-Saharan gas pipeline (in red)

Location
- Country: Nigeria, Niger, Algeria
- Direction: south-north
- Start: Warri, Nigeria
- To: Hassi R'Mel, Algeria

General information
- Type: natural gas
- Partners: Sonatrach, NNPC, Government of Niger
- Commissioned: 2027 (estimated)

Technical information
- Length: 4,128 km (2,565 mi)
- Maximum discharge: 30 billion cubic meters per year

The Trans-Saharan Gas Pipeline (TSGP; also known as NIGAL Pipeline and Trans-African Gas Pipeline) is a 4,128 kilometre pipeline under construction to transport up to 30 billion cubic meters of natural gas annually from Nigeria to Algeria via Niger. It is seen as an opportunity to diversify the European Union's gas supplies and Nigeria's gas exports. The total cost of the pipeline is estimated between US$10 billion and US $13 billion

== Background ==
Nigeria and Algeria hold Africa's largest natural gas reserves. Algeria has long exported gas to Europe via several pipelines. Due to a European boycott of Russian gas imports during the Ukraine war, Algeria has become one of Europe's main suppliers, accounting for about 12% of European gas imports in 2025.

Nigeria for its part has declared plans to become Africa's leading gas economy, including pipeline infrastructure for increased exports to Europe. Currently, these exports are dependent on LNG tankers.

The TSGP is in competition with another planned gas pipeline connecting Nigeria to Europe, the African Atlantic Gas Pipeline (AAGP), backed by Morocco. Although the TSGP is a shorter route and could be completed sooner, unlike the TSGP, the AAGP's route avoids the precarious security situation of the Sahel.

== History ==
A trans-Saharan pipeline was first proposed in the 1970s. On 14 January 2002, the Nigerian National Petroleum Corporation (NNPC) and Algerian national oil and gas company Sonatrach signed a memorandum of understanding for preparations of the project. In June 2005, NNPC and Sonatrach signed a contract with Penspen Limited for a feasibility study. The study was completed in September 2006, and it found the pipeline to be technically and economically feasible and reliable.

On 20 February 2009, NNPC and Sonatrach agreed to proceed with the draft memorandum of understanding between the three governments and the joint venture agreement. The intergovernmental agreement on the pipeline was signed by the energy ministers of Nigeria, Niger and Algeria on 3 July 2009 in Abuja. The pipeline was originally expected to be operational by 2015. The original investment for the pipeline was expected to be around US$10 billion and around $3 billion for gas gathering centers.

Safety concerns about the project have been raised due to a terrorist insurgency in North Africa, which has resulted in incidents like the In Aménas hostage crisis of 2013. Nigeria, Niger and Algeria are among the least secure areas in the region because of various active terrorist movements that destabilise them.

Following Russia's invasion of Ukraine in February 2022, there was growing interest in the project as European countries sought to replace their gas imports from Russia. On 28 July 2022, the Algerian, Nigerian, and Nigerien ministers of energy signed in Algiers a memorandum of understanding for the implementation of the TSGP project, co-signed by Mohamed Arkab, Timipre Sylva, and Mahamane Sani Mahamadou.

On February 11, 2025, Algeria, Nigeria and Niger signed agreements to accelerate the construction of the TSGP. The implementation and delivery schedule should be announced after a feasibility update study.

On June 4th, 2026, Minister of Hydrocarbons of Algeria, Mohamed Arkab; Nigeria’s Minister of State for Petroleum Resources (Gas), Ekperikpe Ekpo; and Niger’s Minister of Petroleum, Mr. Hamadou Tinni which met in Algiers, have declared in joint statements that all parties are interested in the project as a national priority and marks a top Agenda for Nigeria, Niger and Algeria. Construction of the Algerian section began in June 2026, with Niger expected to begin work on its section in early 2027. Costs are estimated between US$10 billion and US $13 billion.

In November 2026, during the ADIPEC conference in Abu Dhabi, representatives from Nigerian, Algerian, and Nigerien state energy entities announced an agreement on a joint-venture financing framework for the Trans-Saharan Gas Pipeline, preceding final investment decision (FID) negotiations scheduled for 2027.

== Route ==
The pipeline starts in the Warri region in Nigeria and runs north through Niger to Algeria's Hassi R'Mel gas hub. In Hassi R'Mel, the pipeline is to connect to the existing Trans-Mediterranean, Maghreb–Europe, Medgaz and Galsi pipelines. These supply Europe from the gas transmission hubs at El Kala and Beni Saf on Algeria's Mediterranean coast. The length of the pipeline would be 4,128 kilometres (2,565 mi): 1,037 kilometres (644 mi) in Nigeria, 841 kilometres (523 mi) in Niger, and 2,310 kilometres (1,440 mi) in Algeria.

== Technical features ==
The annual capacity of the pipeline will be up to 30 billion cubic meters of natural gas. It will have a diameter of 48 to 56 inches (1,220 to 1,420 mm).

== Operator ==
The pipeline is to be built and operated in partnership between NNPC and Sonatrach. The operator company would also include Niger. Initially, NNPC and Sonatrach would hold a total 90% of shares, while Niger would hold 10%.

Russian gas company Gazprom has negotiated with Nigeria about its possible participation in the project. Indian company GAIL, France's TotalEnergies, Italy's Eni SpA and Royal Dutch Shell have also expressed interest in participating.

According to Algerian energy minister Chakib Khelil "only partners that can bring something to the project, not just money, should be there." The energy ministers of Algeria and Nigeria have said that "if things go well, there will be no need to bring international oil companies into the project" and "if the need for partnership in the project arises, not every partner will be welcome on board on the project."

== Opposition to the pipeline ==
The pipeline is opposed by the Nigerian militant group Movement for the Emancipation of the Niger Delta. A spokesman for the group warned that until issues regarding the exploitation of the Niger Delta and its people have been resolved, "any money put into the project will go down the drain."

== See also ==
- African Atlantic Gas Pipeline
- West African Gas Pipeline
