= Sahara Blend =

Algerian crude oil

The Sahara Blend is the reference name of the Algerian crude oil, which is produced on several Algerian oil fields.

== Characteristics ==
Sahara Blend is a light crude, its extreme lightness and very low sulfur content makes it among the most popular with refineries for light derivatives such as gasoline and kerosene compared to Brent and West Texas Intermediate (WTI).

The API gravity of the Sahara Blend is around 45° and a sulfur content of 0.05%.

== Rating ==
The Sahara Blend is listed on the London market, which is the benchmark for the Algerian barrel price.

== See also ==
- Brent Crude
