= Snam =

Italian gas transmission system operator

Snam S.p.A.
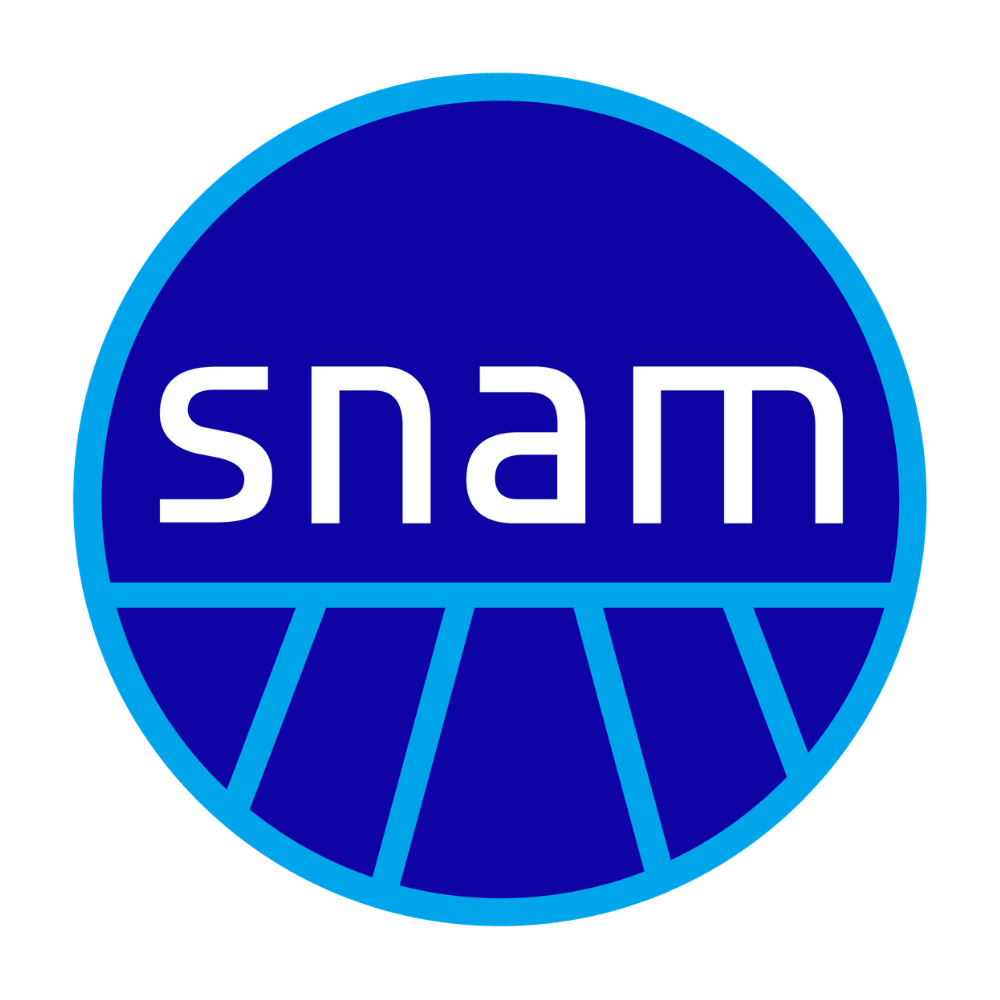

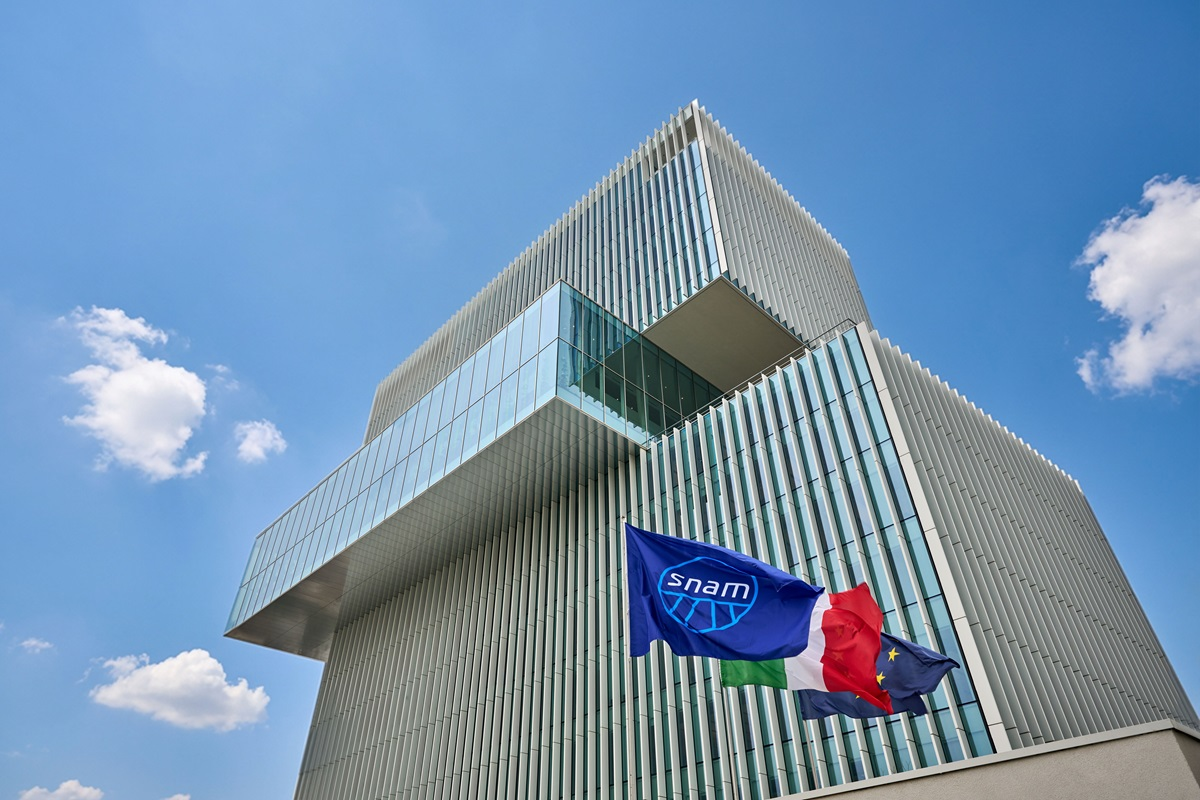
- Snam headquarters at the energy house, Via Vezza d’Oglio 6, Milan
- Type: Società per Azioni
- Traded as: BIT: SRG; FTSE MIB
- ISIN: IT0003153415
- Industry: Gas industry
- Founded: October 30, 1941
- Headquarters: Milan, Italy
- Key people: Alessandro Zehentner (Chairman); Agostino Scornajenchi (CEO)
- Services: Natural gas transmission, storage and regasification
- Revenue: €3,568 million (2024)
- Operating income: adjusted €1,477 million (2023)
- Net income: Group adjusted net profit: €1,289 million (2024)
- Total assets: €33,525 million (2023)
- Total equity: €7,680 million (2023)
- Owner: CDP Reti (31.4%)
- Number of employees: 3,901 (2024)
- Subsidiaries: Stogit; Snam Rete Gas; GNL Italia
- Website: www.snam.it/en/home.html

Snam S.p.A. is Italy’s natural gas transmission system operator, responsible for managing the country’s main high‑pressure pipeline network that transports gas from entry points to distributors, industry, and power plants, and also active in storage, LNG, and hydrogen.

As of 31 December 2023, it had a market capitalization of €15,611 million. Snam was originally a subsidiary of Italian energy company Eni. It has since become an independent company, whose largest shareholder is CDP Reti, a holding company controlled by the Italian state. The utility operates in Italy and, through associated companies, in Austria (TAG, GCA), France (Terēga), Greece (DESFA), the UAE (Adnoc Gas Pipelines) and the United Kingdom (Interconnector UK and dCarbonX Limited). It is one of the main shareholders of the Trans Adriatic Pipeline (TAP). Snam is the main Italian operator for the transport and dispatching of natural gas in Italy, having almost all the transport infrastructures in Italy, with 32,862 km of gas pipelines in operation in high and medium pressure (approximately 94% of the entire transport) and around 38,000 km including international activities. First in Europe for natural gas storage capacity (around 17 billion cubic meters, including international activities), the company is also one of the main continental operators in regasification for a total pro quota capacity of approximately 13.5 billion cubic meters per year. Snam is one of Europe's main regulated gas companies - leading Italy in gas transport and storage, while ranking third in regasification. Snam also aims to invest in new energy transition businesses to reduce environmental impact and decarbonisation: sustainable mobility (compressed – CNG – and liquefied – LNG – natural gas distributors, Small Scale LNG), energy efficiency, renewable gases such as biomethane and hydrogen. The company is listed on the FTSE MIB index of the Borsa Italiana since 6 December 2001.

Snam ensures the security of supplies and promotes the energy transition through investments in green gases (biomethane and hydrogen), energy efficiency, and CCS (Carbon capture and storage) technology. Additionally, the company creates new green areas through a benefit corporation focused on urban forestry projects.

Snam also aims to reduce direct greenhouse gas emissions by 25% by 2027, 40% by 2030, and 50% by 2032, with the goal of achieving carbon neutrality (100%) by 2040, compensating for emissions that cannot be eliminated through offsetting projects and involving subsidiaries and suppliers. Snam pursues net zero for all emissions (including indirect ones) by 2050. The Group is also working to reduce natural gas emissions from its assets: in 2023, Snam achieved a 55% reduction compared to 2015 and has set a target of 64% by 2027. The company’s business model is based on sustainable growth, transparency, talent and diversity development, and the social protection and development of local areas.

== History ==
Snam was founded on 30 October 1941 in San Donato Milanese, Lombardy, with the name Società Nazionale Metanodotti, with participation from Ente Nazionale Metano (Agip), Regie Terme di Salsomaggiore, and Società Anonima Utilizzazione e Ricerca Gas Idrocarburati (SURGI). The objectives were the construction of methane pipelines, and the distribution and sale of gas. During wartime, methane became crucial for Italy, leading to the construction of the first methane pipeline bringing gas from the wells in Salsomaggiore (Parma) to Lodi and Milan.

With the Italian law of February 10, 1953, nr. 136, at the time of the establishment of ENI, the impact of methane production in the Po Valley remained significant, making the exclusive reserve on the exploration and cultivation of hydrocarbons granted to the state company in that area highly relevant. This was due to both the economic and industrial value of methane production in the Po Valley and its symbolic significance to the public. To protect the Italian state’s subsurface resources, AGIP had received exclusive rights to the area’s resources by virtue of an outdated mining law.

Structured into functional subholdings (AGIP mineraria for oil and methane exploration and distribution; AGIP for refining and selling petroleum products and methane; SNAM, Società NAzionale Metanodotti, for the transportation system; ANIC, for coordinating chemical activities), the ENI group was thus able to finance its growth through the sale of natural gas (methane rent), also stimulating the Italian economy by providing low-cost energy.

In 1955, Snam Montaggi was established, incorporating SAIP in 1957 and becoming Saipem. In 1956, Snam Progetti (later Snamprogetti) was founded for designing large onshore plants. In 2006, Saipem acquired all Snamprogetti shares from Eni.

In 1961, the construction of two methane pipelines in central and southern Italy began. The first transported gas discovered in the province of Chieti to Terni and Rome, and the second transported methane extracted in Basilicata to the coast of Puglia. Within ten years, the gas transportation network reached a national scale with an extension of 8,000 kilometers. In 1974, gas from the Siberian fields arrived in Sergnano (Cremona), and the same year saw the start of an 830-kilometer pipeline importing gas from the Groeningen field (Netherlands). By 1980, Snam’s gas pipelines reached a total length of nearly 15,000 kilometers.

In 1983, the Transmed pipeline was completed, capable of transporting Algerian gas through the Mediterranean and Italy, from Sicily to Lombardy, over a total length of more than 2,400 kilometers.

On 1 June 2001, following the European directive for the liberalization of the gas market, Snam separated its non-transport activities and changed its name to Snam Rete Gas. On July 27, 2001, GNL Italia was established, wholly owned by the company. Snam Rete Gas has been traded on the Borsa Italiana since 6 December 2001. On 1 January 2012, it was renamed with the original name of Snam.

On February 12, 2009, Snam Rete Gas S.p.A. acquired 100% of Italgas S.p.A. from Eni S.p.A. for 3.07 billion euros, and 100% of Stoccaggi Gas Italia S.p.A. for 1.65 billion euros. Payment was made through a capital increase of 3.5 billion euros and a 1.3-billion-euro loan. The transaction closed in July 2009, creating a group with a gas transportation network of 31,500 kilometers, a gas distribution network of 58,000 kilometers, and a storage capacity of 14 billion cubic meters, including 5 billion cubic meters of strategic reserve.

Starting January 1, 2012, the name changed from Snam Rete Gas to Snam S.p.A., and in compliance with European directives, the transportation business was transferred to the new wholly owned subsidiary Snam Rete Gas S.p.A. The company changed its logo, abandoning Eni’s six-legged dog and adopting a logo similar to the original from the 1940s.

In April 2019, Snam launched the first injection of a hydrogen and natural gas into the pipeline, the Europe's first commercial test of a hydrogen-methane blend in a high-pressure network.

In April 2023, Snam received a 300-million-euro loan from Cassa Depositi e Prestiti (CDP) for the construction of the Adriatic Backbone, a gas pipeline under construction to increase the transportation capacity at entry points in Southern Italy. Phase 1 of the project is among the works financed under the RepowerEU Plan.

In May 2024, Snam received a 200-million-euro ESG-linked loan from Cassa Depositi e Prestiti (CDP). The operation is dedicated to the reconstruction of the Ravenna-Chieti gas pipeline and strengthens the infrastructure for transporting natural gas from Southern to Northern Italy. In a perspective of energy security and decarbonization, it will also be compatible with hydrogen transport. The gas pipeline, whose main line will be completed by 2026, will be interconnected with the Adriatic Backbone currently under construction.

The 200-million-euro ESG-linked loan contributes to achieving Snam’s sustainable finance target of 85% by 2027.

In May 2024, during the presentation of the first-quarter financial results, Snam revised upward its 2024 guidance for EBITDA and net profit, increasing the financial targets for 2024 and anticipating the goals set by the 2023-2027 Industrial Plan by one year.

In March 2026, the company presented its 2026-2030 Industrial Plan, including €14 billion in investments for transport, storage, and regasification infrastructure and the Ravenna CCS (carbon capture and storage) project. The 2025 financial results reported a net income of €1.42 billion and an EBITDA of €2.96 billion.

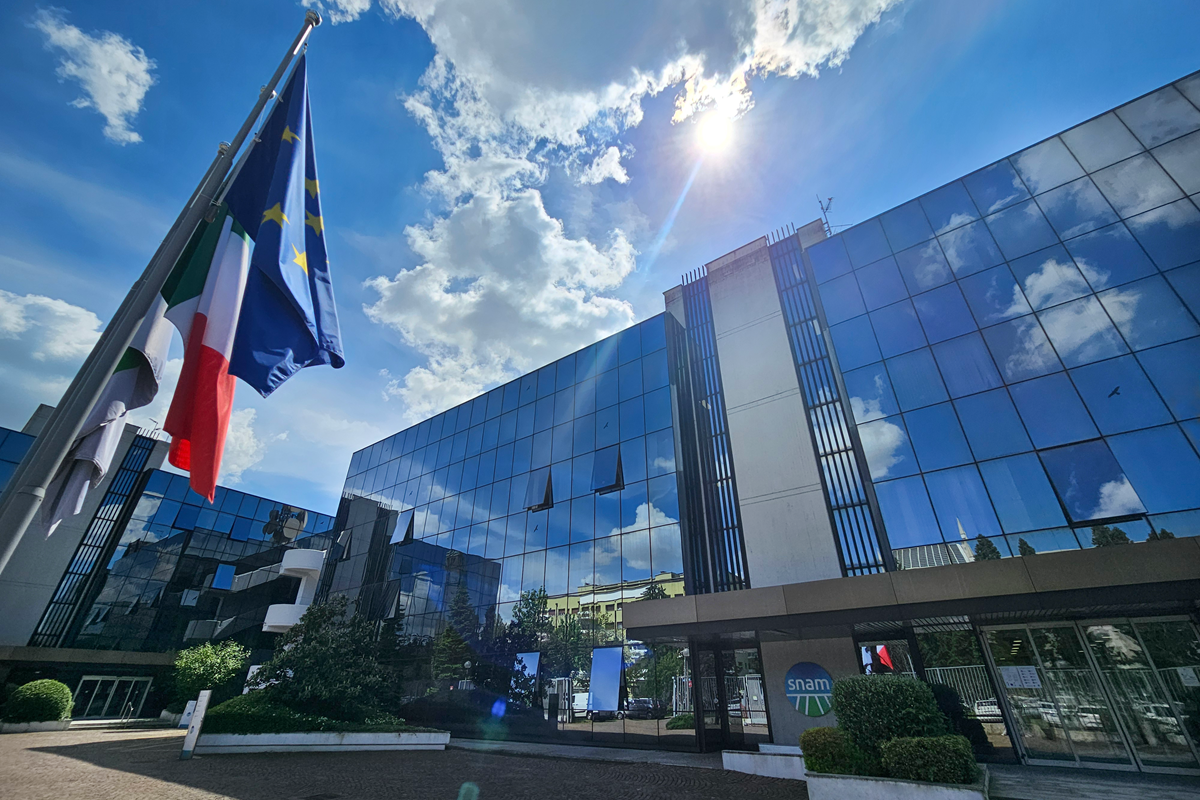
Snam former headquarters in Piazza Santa Barbara in San Donato Milanese (MI)

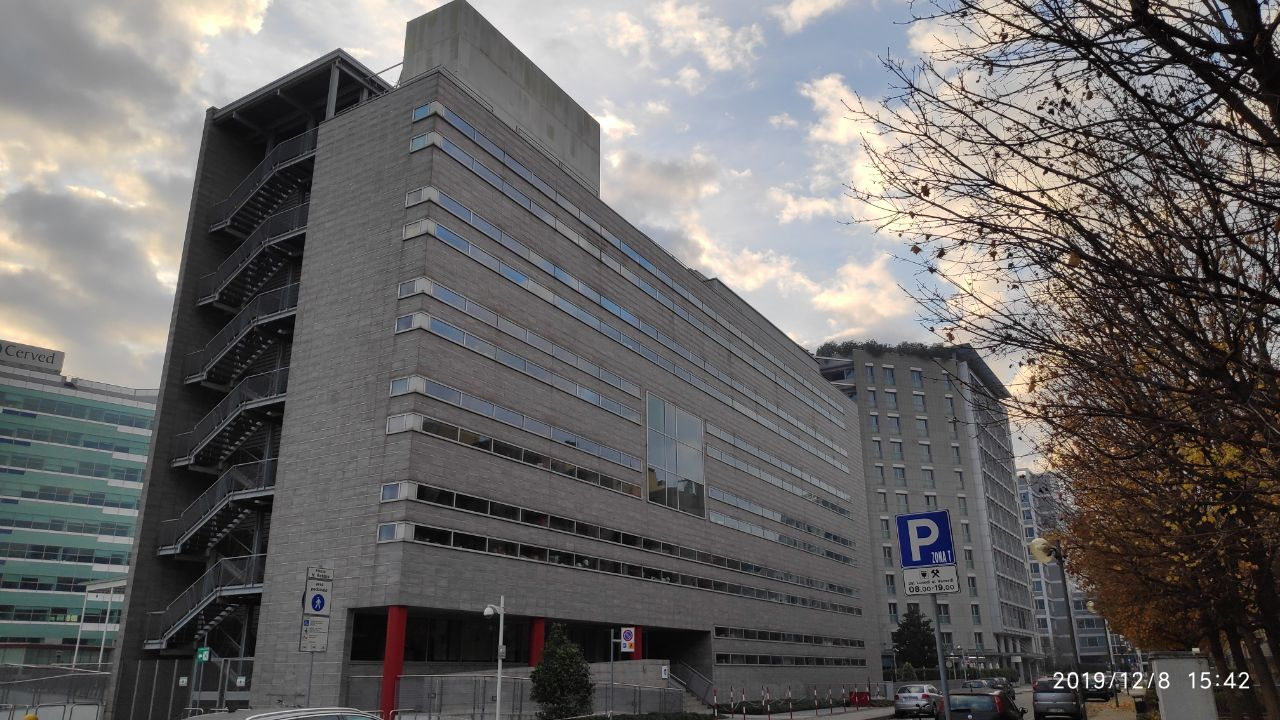
Snam office on Via Maastricht in San Donato Milanese (MI)

=== Italgas partial spin-off ===
Starting November 7, 2016, following the partial proportional spin-off of Snam S.p.A., with the transfer of 86.5% of the stake held in Italgas Reti S.p.A. to its shareholders, Italgas S.p.A. was re-listed on the stock exchange after 13 years. From 2018, Snam’s brand identity was renewed, with a new logo and values accompanying the company in new projects such as the construction of infrastructure for stable and secure energy supplies and the development of gas as a renewable source. The renewed brand marked the transition towards the concept of landscape and environmental responsibility.

In 2024, Snam also proposed a new ambition statement (“Energy infrastructure for a sustainable future”) highlighting new sustainability goals, including reducing emissions to achieve carbon neutrality by 2040 and “Net Zero” by 2050.

== Corporate structure ==
As of December 31, 2023, according to the 2023 Financial Report approved at the Snam Shareholders’ Meeting on May 7, 2024, the Group’s structure is as follows:

=== Transportation ===
Companies involved in the transportation and dispatching of natural gas:

- Snam Rete Gas (100%)
- Asset Company 2 Srl (100%)
  - Infrastrutture Trasporto Gas Spa (100%)
- Enura Spa (55%), a joint venture between Snam and Sgi, established to develop the methane transportation infrastructure in Sardinia

=== Storage ===
- Stogit Spa (100%), which manages 9 natural gas storage facilities in Italy (Brugherio, Bordolano, Cortemaggiore, Treste River, Minerbio, Ripalta, Sabbioncello, Sergnano, and Settala)

=== Regasification ===
- GNL Italia Spa (100%), the main operator in the regasification of liquefied natural gas (LNG), manages the Panigaglia Regasification Plant
- Snam FRSU Italia Srl (100%), which manages the Italis LNG (formerly Golar Tundra, now operating under the Italian flag) and BW Singapore floating regasification terminals (FSRU) acquired by Snam
  - FSRU I Limited (100%)
  - Ravenna LNG Terminal Srl (100%)

=== Sustainable mobility ===
- Greenture Spa (100%), formerly Snam4Mobility until March 2023, promotes the decarbonization of land, sea, and rail transport, as well as off-grid industrial and civil users, through the development of infrastructure primarily supporting the use of Bio C-LNG (Compressed and Liquefied Natural Gas) and hydrogen
  - Cubogas (100%), which designs, develops, and produces compression technologies for natural gas, biomethane, and hydrogen, supporting the energy transition of industries

=== Energy transition ===
- Bioenerys Srl (100%), formerly Snam4Environment until November 2022, focuses on promoting the development of biogas infrastructure and its use across the Italian territory, fostering the circular economy
  - Bioenerys Agri (100%), formerly IES Biogas, active in the design, construction, maintenance, and assistance of biogas and biomethane production plants from agricultural and agro-industrial waste
  - Bioenerys Ambiente (100%), formerly Renerwaste, one of Italy’s leading companies in managing biogas and biomethane production plants for the energy recovery of the biodegradable waste
- Renovit Spa (60.05%), a certified B Corp since 2022 and a benefit company since 2023, is the Italian platform initiated by Snam and CDP Equity to promote the energy efficiency of companies, condominiums, tertiary sector, and public administration, and to foster Italy’s sustainable development and energy transition
  - TEP Energy Solution Srl (100%), active since 2006, is an energy service company specializing in the industrial sector and the energy requalification and seismic improvement of residential buildings and those used in the tertiary sector
  - Evolve Spa (70%), established in 1999, is one of Italy’s first energy service companies, specializing in integrated energy services for private and public residential buildings and those used in the tertiary sector
  - Renovit Public Solutions Spa (70%), one of Italy’s leading operators in integrated energy services and technological multiservice, or global service, for public entities, public and private healthcare facilities, and the tertiary sector
  - Renovit Consorzio Stabile, composed of the operational companies of the Renovit Group, TEP Energy Solution, Renovit Public Solutions, and Evolve, integrating the technical and financial suitability requirements of the consortia
- Asset Company 10 Srl (100%), which holds a 21.59% stake in Industrie De Nora, a company involved in the development of decarbonization services, particularly in the hydrogen sector

=== Urban forestry ===
- Arbolia (100%), a benefit company created by Snam and Cassa Depositi e Prestiti in 2020, with Snam becoming the sole shareholder in 2023. It is active in developing green areas in cities and territories across Italy

== Operations ==
In Italy, Snam is responsible for natural gas transportation, dispatching and storage as well as regasification of liquefied natural gas (LNG). Snam's assets include:

- over 40,000 km of gas pipelines operating in Italy and abroad
- 1 national dispatching Center in San Donato Milanese
- 12 gas storage facilities in Brugherio, Bordolano, Cortemaggiore, Fiume Treste, Minerbio, Ripalta, Sabbioncello, Sergnano, Settala, Cellino, Collalto, San Potito, and Cotignola
- 13 compression plants in Masera, Sergnano, Malborghetto, Istrana, Poggio Renatico, Minerbio, Terranuova, Gallese, Melizzano, Montesano, Tarsia, Messina, and Enna
- 2 onshore regasification plants: the Panigaglia Regasification Plant, the OLT Offshore LNG Toscana plant (49.07% ownership), and the Adriatic LNG terminal (30% ownership)
- 2 floating storage regasification units (FSRUs): Italis LNG (formerly Golar Tundra, acquired in May 2022 and now operating under the Italian flag), and BW Singapore, acquired in December 2023
- 48 maintenance centers

Investments:

- Vision to 2030: 23 billion euros of investment opportunities in the 2021-2030 period in three growth areas (energy networks, energy storage and green energy projects).

Peers/competitors:

- Terna Group - the main electricity grid owner in Italy, responsible for high voltage electricity transmission and dispatching nationwide
- Enagás - Technical Manager of the Spanish gas System and the main carrier of natural gas
- Red Eléctrica de España (REE): manages the Spanish transmission grid and acts as sole transmission agent; it is also the System Operator
- National Grid (UK): operates in the regulated businesses of transmission and distribution of electricity and gas mainly in the United Kingdom and northeastern United States

Market share:

| Business | Data | Market position (Italy) | Market share (Italy) |
|---|---|---|---|
| Transport | 32,895 km of gas pipelines | 1st | > 90% |
| Storage | 16,700 million m3 of storage capacity, strategic storage included | 1st | > 90% |
| Regasification | > 3.5 BCM of regasification capacity of the terminal | 3rd | > 20% |

== Shareholders structure ==
As of August 2023

| Shareholder | Stake |
|---|---|
| CDP Reti | 31.4% |
| Romano Minozzi | 7.5% |
| Banca d'Italia | 1.4% |
| Snam | 0.2% |
| Retail investors | 8.7% |
| Institutional investors | 50.8% |

== Board of directors ==
Appointed by the Shareholders' Meeting in May 2025

| Role | Name and surname |
|---|---|
| Chairman | Alessandro Zehentner |
| Chief Executive Officer | Agostino Scornajenchi |
| Director | Paola Panzeri |
| Director | Laura Cavatorta |
| Director | Augusta Iannini |
| Director | Piero Manzoni |
| Director | Andrea Mascetti |
| Director | Qinjing Shen |
| Director | Esedra Chiacchella |

== Snam's numbers ==
| Year | Total revenues (in millions of €) | Operating income – EBIT adjusted (in millions of €) | Net income - Adjusted (in millions of €) | Technical investments (in millions of €) | Market capitalization (in millions of €) | Equity (in millions of €) | Financial debt (in millions of €) | Employees |
|---|---|---|---|---|---|---|---|---|
| 2024 | 3.568 | 1.734 | 1.289 | 2.912 | 14.792 | 8.973 | 16.238 | 3.901 |
| 2023 | 3.875 | 1.477 | 1.168 | 1.774 | 15.611 | 7.635 | 15.270 | 3.798 |
| 2022 | 3.317 | 1.364 | 1.164 | 1.351 | 15.178 | 7.468 | 11.923 | 3.610 |
| 2021 | 2.979 | 1.430 | 1.222 | 1.270 | 17.343 | 7.203 | 14.021 | 3.430 |
| 2020 | 2.770 | 1.424 | 1.164 | 981 | 15.046 | 6.472 | 12.887 | 3.249 |
| 2019 | 2.606 | 1.417 | 1.093 | 813 | 15.428 | 6.258 | 11.923 | 3.025 |
| 2018 | 2.530 | 1.405 | 1.010 | 764 | 12.606 | 5.985 | 11.548 | 3.016 |
| 2017 | 2.441 | 1.363 | 940 | 1.034 | 13.953 | 6.188 | 11.550 | 2.919 |
| 2016 | 2.560 | 1.336 | 845 | 906 | 13.612 | 6.497 | 11.056 | 2.883 |
| 2015 | 3.649 | 1.950 | 1.209 | 1.272 | 16.973 | 7.585 | 13.779 | 6.303 |
| 2014 | 3.529 | 1.973 | 1.078 | 1.313 | 14.383 | 7.171 | 13.652 | 6.072 |
| 2013 | 3.529 | 2.034 | 934 | 1.290 | 13.655 | 5.994 | 13.326 | 6.045 |
| 2012 | 3.621 | 2.111 | 992 | 1.300 | 11.893 | 5.916 | 12.398 | 6.051 |
| 2011 | 3.245 | 1.958 | 978 | 1.585 | 11.454 | 5.792 | 11.197 | 6.112 |

=== Operational data ===
| Year | Operational gas pipelines in Italy (in km) | Natural gas injected into the transportation network (in billion m³) | Natural gas handled in storage (in billion m³) | Total storage capacity, including strategic storage (in billion m³) | Quantity of regasified LNG (in billion m³) |
|---|---|---|---|---|---|
| 2024 | 32.900 | 61,82 | 14,58 | 16,9 | 4,54 |
| 2023 | 32.895 | 64,07 | 13,72 | 16,7 | 3,69 |
| 2022 | 32.862 | 75,42 | 18,47 | 16,5 | 2,24 |
| 2021 | 32.767 | 75,77 | 18,41 | 16,5 | 1,05 |
| 2020 | 32.647 | 69,97 | 19,01 | 17,0 | 2,52 |
| 2019 | 32.508 | 75,37 | 19,33 | 17,0 | 2,40 |
| 2018 | 32.625 | 72,82 | 21,07 | 16,9 | 0,91 |
| 2017 | 32.584 | 74,59 | 19,92 | 16,7 | 0,63 |
| 2016 | 32.508 | 70,64 | 20,00 | 16,5 | 0,21 |
| 2015 | 32.534 | 67,25 | 19,58 | 16,0 | 0,03 |
| 2014 | 32.339 | 62,25 | 15,70 | 15,9 | 0,01 |
| 2013 | 32.306 | 69,01 | 18,42 | 15,9 | 0,05 |
| 2012 | 32.345 | 75,78 | 15,63 | 15,7 | 1,12 |
| 2011 | 32.010 | 78,30 | 15,31 | 14,5 | 1,89 |

== Sustainability ==
Snam's approach to sustainability is based on Shared Value, a concept elaborated by Michael E. Porter in collaboration with Mark R. Kramer that explores the link between a company and its environment and their mutual interdependence. In order to create Shared Value, Snam promotes sustainable development and ESG (environmental, social, and corporate governance) factors integration along its transport, dispatchment, regasification, storage and distribution process. Snam adopts an ESG Committee, made up of independent members of the board with advisory function on the link between corporate performance and environmental, social and governance factors.

In 2009 the company joined the United Nations Global Compact and since 2006 has published a sustainability report in accordance with the Global Reporting Initiative's guidelines. Since 2015 Snam also has published an Integrated Report, inspired by International Integrated Report Council (IIRC) principles, inside the Annual Report, and since 2018 Snam has published the Non Financial Statement according Italian Dlgs. 254 still inside Annual Report. Moreover, Snam has adhered to the Task Force on Climate-related Financial Disclosures (TCFD) in 2018 and published its first document about Climate change, "Snam for the future".

Snam operates within the reference framework of the United Nations Universal Declaration of Human Rights, the Fundamental Conventions of the ILO and the OECD Guidelines on Multinational Enterprises.

Its commitment towards the environment focuses on the reduction of greenhouse gas emissions and safeguarding biodiversity. Among its social initiatives, Snam partners with Legambiente and Federparchi and, in 2012, joined the Sodalitas Foundation, which seeks to build bridges between the entrepreneurial world in Italy and the non-profit sector.

In 2017 Snam established its corporate foundation – Fondazione Snam - with the aim of contributing to the social, cultural and economic growth of areas affected by Snam's activities or marked by social inequality.

== Indices ==
Snam's stock is included in numerous financial and sustainability indices, both national and international.

=== Financial indices ===
- FTSE Mib: The main benchmark index of the Italian stock markets. It measures the performance of 40 Italian stocks and aims to replicate the sectoral weights of the broader Italian stock market.
- FTSE Italia All-Share: This index includes all the constituents of the FTSE MIB, FTSE Italia Mid Cap, and FTSE Italia Small Cap indices.
- DJ Euro Stoxx 50: The leading blue-chip index in Europe, representing the largest companies in the Eurozone.
- DJ Stoxx 600 Utilities: Derived from the STOXX Europe Total Market Index (TMI), it is a subset of the STOXX Global 1800 index, representing large, mid, and small companies in the utilities sector across 18 European countries.

=== Sustainability indices ===
- Dow Jones Sustainability World Index: In December 2024, Snam was confirmed for the fifteenth time in the Dow Jones Sustainability World Index by S&P Global, which assesses the sustainability performance of publicly traded companies.
- FTSE4Good: Since 2002, Snam Rete Gas, and subsequently Snam, have been included in this sustainability index, which is internationally recognized by the financial community for its importance and influence in the composition of benchmarks and ethical portfolios. Snam met the FTSE criteria in the areas of Environmental, Social, and Governance (ESG).
- Sustainalytics: In 2024, Snam was once again ranked at the top of the Sustainalytics index for the gas utility sector (first out of 96). Sustainalytics is one of the leading independent firms specializing in ESG and corporate governance research, ratings and analytics. Its evaluation model covers a wide range of ESG risk topics specific to industries and companies.
- Gold Standard – UN: For three consecutive years (2021-2022-2023), Snam received the United Nations’ Gold Standard for its commitment to reducing methane emissions.
- A-list – CDP: Snam has been included in the CDP’s “A List” for climate change action for three years (2020-2022-2023), and in the CDP list for climate change with a B rating in 2025.

=== Gender equality indices ===
- Bloomberg - Gender-Equality Index (GEI) 2022: For the fourth time, Snam is among the 325 companies globally included in the Gender-Equality Index.

== Awards ==
- Webranking Europe 500 2023-2024 – Lundquist by Comprend: Snam ranked second in Europe for best corporate and financial digital communication (2023).
- Green Awards - Greentech Festival (2022): Snam won in the “Energy” category of the Green Awards 2022.
- Webby Awards (2024): Snam’s communication campaign “Piccoli gesti, grande impatto” (“Small gestures, big impact”), created by Bitmama Reply, received two Bronze Anthem awards at the 2024 Webby Awards.

== Brand identity ==
The last two updates to Snam’s brand identity occurred in 2012 and 2018.

The first was implemented following the company’s name change from Snam Rete Gas to Snam. The new brand, applied across all controlled activities, was a reinterpretation of the historic 1940s logo chosen to enhance Snam’s strategic role. The selected colors also supported the effort to reclaim historical memory, with blue traditionally representing the natural essence of methane gas, and shades of gray up to metal tones emphasizing the physical elements of infrastructure and the technology used in their construction.

In 2018, a new logo was introduced, still rooted in Snam’s tradition, featuring a color shift from blue to green to underscore the sustainability and environmental compatibility of natural gas. The use of lowercase letters gave the brand a more friendly and dynamic tone, moving away from the acronym SNAM. The same year also saw the introduction of the new purpose “Energia per ispirare il mondo” (“Energy to inspire the world”), a message that forms the cornerstone of Snam’s strategic repositioning after celebrating its 75th anniversary.

In 2024, Snam presented its new ambition statement “Infrastrutture energetiche per un futuro sostenibile” (“Energy infrastructure for a sustainable future”) as a completion of its value system. The expression highlights new sustainability goals, including CO_{2} emission reduction and achieving carbon neutrality by 2040, alongside the “Net Zero” objective by 2050.

== Historical logos ==
Logo from 1941 to 1951.

Logo from 1951 to 1955.

Logo from 1955 to 1961.

Logo from 1961 to 2011.

Logo from 2012 to 2018.

Logo from 2018 to 2026.

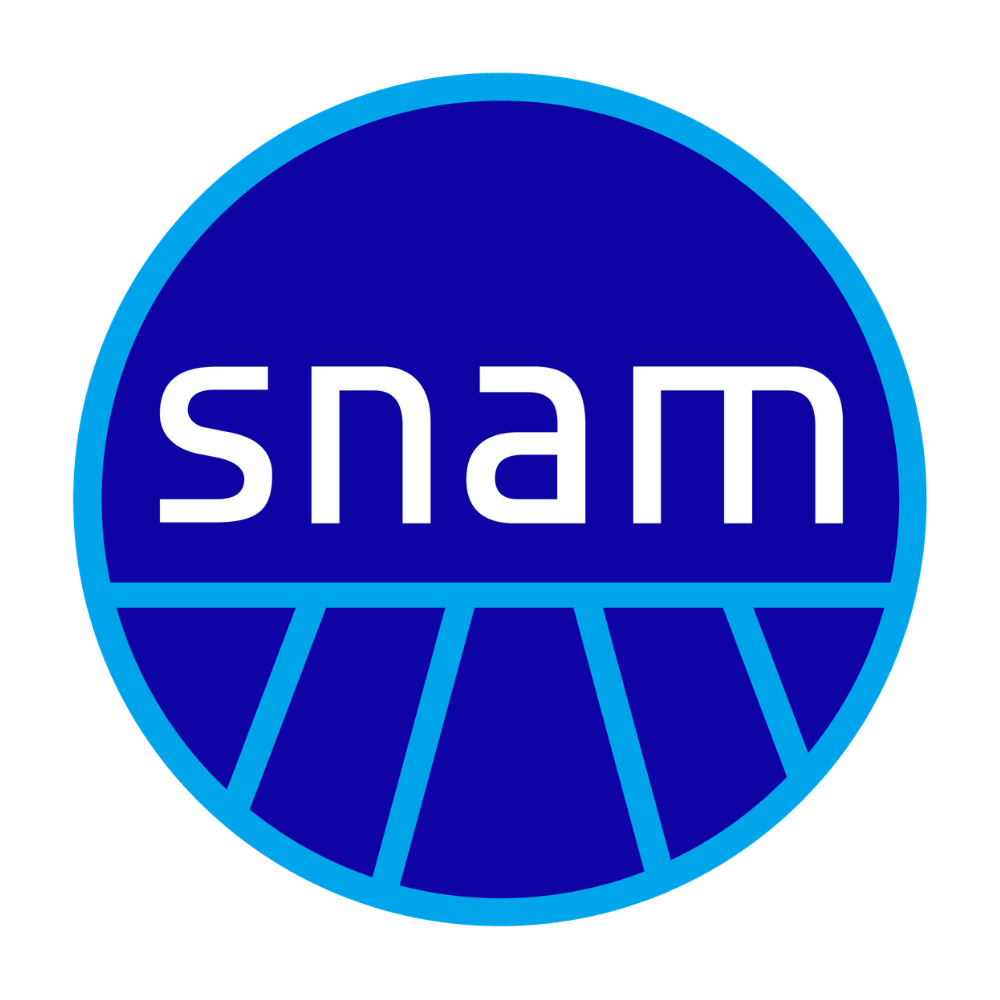
Logo since 2026.

== Archives ==
Part of the printed documentation produced by Società Nazionale Metanodotti (Snam), one of the pioneering companies in the oil and gas sector in Italy, is preserved at the Eni Historical Archive in Rome.

== See also ==
- Energy development
- Energy transition
- Natural gas
- Natural gas storage
- Regasification
- Carbon capture and storage
- Hydrogen infrastructure
- Società Sportiva Metanopoli
- 2022 Russia–European Union gas dispute, in which EU member states sought to rapidly exclude natural gas imports from Russia following Russia's invasion of Ukraine
