= Ourhoud Oil Field =

Oil field in Ouargla Province, Algeria

- Country: Algeria
- Region: Ouargla Province
- Offshore/onshore: onshore
- Operators: [Sonatrach]

Field history
- Discovery: 1994
- Start of development: 1998
- Start of production: 2002

Production
- Current production of oil: 250,000 barrels per day (~1.2×10^{7} t/a)
- Estimated oil in place: 140 million tonnes (~ 200×10^{6} m^{3} or 1000 million bbl)

Ourhoud Oil Field is an oil field located in Ouargla Province. It was discovered in 1994 and developed by Sonatrach. The total proven reserves of the Ourhoud oil field are around 1 billion barrels (140 million tonnes), and production is centered on 250,000 barrels per day (40,000 m^{3}/d).
