= Medgaz =

Natural gas pipeline from Algeria to Spain

Medgaz pipeline
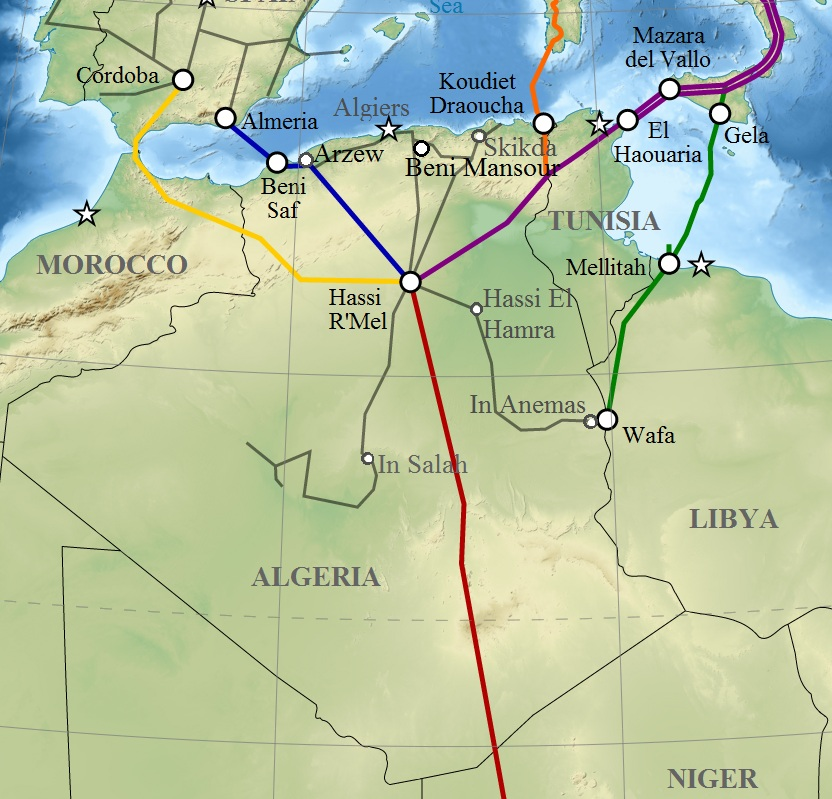
- Location of Medgaz pipeline (in blue)

Location
- Country: Algeria, Spain
- Direction: south-north
- Start: Hassi R'Mel, Algeria
- Passes through: Mediterranean Sea
- To: Almería, Spain

General information
- Type: natural gas
- Partners: Sonatrach, Cepsa, Iberdrola, Endesa, Engie
- Operator: Sociedad para el Estudio y Promocion del Gasoducto Argelia-Europa, via Espana S.A.
- Commissioned: 2010

Technical information
- Length: 757 km (470 mi)
- Maximum discharge: 10.5 billion cubic meters per year
- Website: www.medgaz.com

Medgaz is a submarine natural gas pipeline between Algeria and Spain.

== History ==
The idea of building a direct gas pipeline between Algeria and Europe arose in the 1970s. However, the technical limitations at that time prevented the construction and operation of an ultra deepwater gas pipeline. The preparation of Medgaz project started in 2001 by founding Medgaz pipeline company (Sociedad para el Estudio y Promoción del Gasoducto Argelia-Europa, vía España S.A.). The feasibility study carried out in 2002–2003. The construction started on 7 March 2008 in Almería. Work in laying the subsea stretch was finished in December 2008. The pipeline was officially inaugurated on 1 March 2011.

== Route ==
The pipeline begins from the Hassi R'mel field in Algeria and the first section runs to the port of Beni Saf. The offshore section begins from Beni Saf and the landfall site is at the Perdigal Beach in the coast of Almería, Spain. It will be hooked up to the existing Almería-Albacete gas pipeline.

== Technical description ==
The length of Algerian onshore section is 547 kilometres (340 mi) and the offshore section is 210 kilometres (130 mi). The initial capacity of the 48 inches (1,220 mm) onshore and 24 inches (610 mm) offshore pipeline will be 8 billion cubic meter (bcm) of natural gas annually. It would be possible to increase the capacity of the first pipeline, and also the option to lay a second same diameter pipeline with minimal extra construction is foreseen.

Total estimated costs of project are €900 million, including €630 million for the offshore section. The Algerian onshore section of the pipeline is to be constructed by UTE Initec – Spie Capag and the offshore section is to be constructed by Saipem. The offshore section of the pipeline was laid by Castoro Sei, Saipem 7000 and Crawler pipe-laying ships. Steel pipes are delivered by Nippon Steel, and three compressor trains were supplied by Dresser-Rand. Lloyd's Register would provide pipeline inspection and certification services, including vendor works inspection for the pipeline and equipment and certification for the onshore and offshore pipe lay and the construction of the compressor station.

The initial capacity of 8 billion cubic meters (bcm) per year was expanded to 10.5 billion cubic meters (bcm) per year, for an estimated cost of €68 million. The expansion became operational in 2021.

== Project company ==
The head of the Medgaz company is Pedro Miró Roig. The shareholders of Medgaz consortium:

- Sonatrach (Algeria) – 51%
- Naturgy (Spain) – 49%

In 2006, BP and Total withdrew from the project.

== See also ==
- Trans-Mediterranean Pipeline
- Greenstream pipeline
- GALSI
- Maghreb–Europe Gas Pipeline
- Trans-Saharan gas pipeline
