= Middle East Economic Survey =

MEES
- Company type: Private (Ltd)
- Industry: Publishing, energy news, Middle East analysis
- Founded: Beirut, Lebanon (1957)
- Headquarters: Nicosia, Cyprus
- Website: www.mees.com

MEES (Middle East Economic Survey) is a weekly newsletter published by Middle East Petroleum and Economic Publications (Cyprus) Ltd.

Founded in Beirut Lebanon in 1957 by Fuad W. Itayim, Middle East Economic Survey provides comprehensive source of news and analysis of energy, financial, economic and political developments in the Middle East and North Africa (MENA) countries. Since its establishment in November 1957, it has been recognized as the world’s foremost authority on oil and gas in the region.

Middle East Economic Survey is a newsletter:

- ONS Media Prize in 2000.
- Ian Seymour: former Middle East Economic Survey Editor-in-Chief: The International Association for Energy Economics (IAEE) “Excellence in Written Journalism”, USA, 1985
- Anne-Marie Johnson: former Middle East Economic Survey Associate Editor: The International Association for Energy Economics (IAEE) “Excellence in Written Journalism”, USA, 1997
- Walid Khadduri: former Middle East Economic Survey Executive Editor: The International Association for Energy Economics (IAEE) “Excellence in Written Journalism” Norway, 1993
- Walid Khadduri: former Middle East Economic Survey Executive Editor and currently Middle East Economic Survey Consultant: King ‘Abd Allah Bin ‘Abd al-’Aziz Al Saud Award “Petroleum Journalism Excellence”, Riyadh, Saudi Arabia, 2007
- Walid Khadduri: former Middle East Economic Survey Executive Editor and currently Middle East Economic Survey Consultant: The first OPEC Award for Journalism “Outstanding Career in Oil Reporting”, Vienna, 2009

Middle East Economic Survey is published each week with five clearly labeled sections:

1. Top Stories: Major forward-looking features shedding new light on Middle East energy developments, and the financial and political implications associated with them. Each week, one of the Top Stories is a Middle East Economic Survey Agenda item, highlighting a topic that our editors see as a key subject for discussion in the days ahead for those with an interest in the Middle East energy/finance world.
1. Energy Fundamentals: The vital facts & figures of the week’s Middle East energy developments grouped together in an easily accessible single section. Energy Fundamentals provides comprehensive coverage of oil prices, market trends, and supply and demand developments. It also charts countries’ budget oil price assumptions, and key ratings changes.
1. News By Country: Specialized news by country embodies all the key news developments of the week, from Algeria to the Gulf. Laid out in alphabetical order by country – with a Regional category as well – this section provides a comprehensive round-up of events that will be compulsory reading for anyone attempting to follow the fast-moving Middle East energy scene. As well as news of upstream/midstream/downstream oil and gas changes, and petrochemical and power/desalination projects, Middle East Economic Survey also specializes in coverage of energy finance and analysis of the budgets of the oil/gas producing countries of the Middle East. Furthermore, Middle East Economic Survey follows closely government policies affecting energy and finance, and key energy sector appointments. Middle East Economic Survey is also one of the leading sources of information on upcoming conferences associated with the Middle East.
1. Political Comment: A weekly commentary on developments by Middle East Economic Survey Political Editor Charles Snow, with occasional contributions from other analysts.
1. OP ED/Documents: A much-sought-after platform for outside contributors. Middle East Economic Survey publishes a wide range of longer articles on subjects from some of the world’s leading Middle East experts – government officials, energy industry executives, leading academics and other eminent analysts. The Op Ed pages have proved to our readers to be as stimulating as they are interesting, provoking further debate inside and outside Middle East Economic Survey.

Middle East Economic Survey is delivered electronically or by airmail. It provides a platform for international experts to share their views with the newsletter’s high-profile readership. Also available to subscribers is access to Middle East Economic Survey on-line Archives. Middle East Economic Survey archives comprise the complete issues from Volume 28 (October 1985) to date.
