= Trans-Mediterranean Pipeline =

Gas pipeline connecting Algeria to Italy

Coordinates: 44.6080°N 11.5004°E

- Trans-Mediterranean (in purple) and future Trans-Saharan gas pipelines (in red)

Location
- Country: Algeria, Tunisia, Italy
- Direction: South-North
- Start: Hassi R'Mel, Algeria
- Passes through: Tunisia, Mediterranean Sea
- To: Minerbio, Italy

General information
- Type: natural gas
- Partners: Sonatrach, Sotugat, Eni, Snam
- Operator: Sonatrach, Sergaz, TMPC, TTPC
- Commissioned: 1983

Technical information
- Length: 2,475 km (1,538 mi)
- Maximum discharge: 30.2 billion cubic metres per annum (1.07×10^{12} cu ft/a)
- No. of compressor stations: 9

The Trans-Mediterranean Pipeline (TransMed; also Enrico Mattei gas pipeline) is a natural gas pipeline from Algeria via Tunisia to Sicily and thence to mainland Italy. An extension of the TransMed pipeline delivers Algerian gas to Slovenia.

== History ==
The pipeline from Algeria to Italy was proposed in 1960s. A preliminary feasibility study was conducted in 1969 and the first route survey in 1970. In 1974–75, technical tests of laying pipes in the Mediterranean Sea were carried out. In 1977, supply and transit agreements were signed.

The first phase of pipeline was constructed in 1978–1983 and second phase in 1991–1994. The capacity of the pipeline was doubled in 1994. In 2000, the gas pipeline was named after Enrico Mattei. In the fall of 1997, a terrorist attack severed the pipeline in Algeria for five days.

On February 28, 2010, a new 549-kilometre (341 mi) section was completed in Bir El Ater, Tebessa Province, which was expected to increase transport capacity by 7 billion cubic metres per annum (250 billion cubic feet per annum).

== Route ==
The pipeline begins from the Hassi R'mel field in Algeria and runs 550 kilometres (340 mi) to the Tunisian border. In Tunisia, the pipeline runs for 370 kilometres (230 mi) to El Haouaria, in the Cap Bon region, after which it crosses the 155-kilometre (96 mi)-wide Channel of Sicily. It landfalls in Mazara del Vallo in Sicily. From there, the pipeline continues 340 kilometres (210 mi) in Sicily, 15 kilometres (9.3 mi) across the Strait of Messina and 1,055 kilometres (656 mi) in Italian mainland to northern Italy with a branch to Slovenia.

== Technical description ==
The Algerian section consists of a compressor station and two lines with 48 inches (1,220 mm) diameter. The Tunisian section consists of three compressor stations and two lines of 48 inches (1,220 mm) diameter. In 2007, SCOGAT (Société pour la Construction du Gazoduc Transtunisien) awarded the Italian contractor Saipem a contract for two new gas compression stations and the upgrading of the existing compressor stations allowing to increase the capacity of Tunisian section by 6.5 bcm. The royalties for the gas transport received by Tunisia are 5.25 — 6.75 percent value of the transported gas. The offshore section across Channel of Sicily consists three lines with diameter of 20 inches (510 mm) and two lines with diameter of 26 inches (660 mm). In Italy, the diameter of two lines varies between 42 inches (1,070 mm) and 48 inches (1,220 mm).

In 2012 the capacity of the pipeline increased from 30.2 billion cubic meter (bcm) of natural gas per year up to 33.5 bcm by 2012.

== Operators ==
The Algerian section is operated by Algerian state-owned company Sonatrach. The Tunisian section is owned by the state-owned Sotugat (Société Tunisienne du Gazoduc Trans-tunisien) and commercially operated by TTPC, a wholly owned subsidiary of SeaCorridor (a joint venture between Eni and Snam). The section across the Channel of Sicily is owned by TMPC and commercially operated by Transmed, both joint ventures between SeaCorridor and Sonatrach. The Italian section is operated by Snam Rete Gas.

== See also ==
- Medgaz
- GALSI
- Greenstream pipeline
- Maghreb–Europe Gas Pipeline
- Trans-Saharan gas pipeline
