= GALSI =

Gas pipeline

- Location of GALSI

Location
- Country: Algeria, Italy
- Direction: south-north
- Start: Hassi R'Mel, Algeria
- Passes through: Mediterranean Sea, Sardinia
- To: Tuscany, Italy

General information
- Type: natural gas
- Partners: Sonatrach, Edison S.p.A., Enel, Sfirs, Hera Trading
- Operator: Galsi S.p.A.
- Expected: Cancelled

Technical information
- Length: 284 km (176 mi)
- Maximum discharge: 10 billion cubic meters per year
- Diameter: 48 in (1,219 mm)

GALSI (Italian: Gasdotto Algeria Sardegna Italia) was a planned natural gas pipeline from Algeria to Sardinia and further northern Italy, as an extension to the TransMed Pipeline.

== History ==
The feasibility study was completed in 2005. The intergovernmental agreement on the GALSI pipeline was signed between Italy and Algeria on 14 November 2007.

Early in 2008 one of the project founders, Wintershall, sold its share to other shareholders and left the project.

In 2007, while surveying the proposed route between Sardinia and Algeria, sonar data from an Autonomous Underwater Vehicle (AUV) revealed a large wreck, later determined to be the French battleship Danton, sunk in 1917.

== Route ==
The pipeline would start from the Hassi R'mel field in Algeria and the 640 kilometres (400 mi) section would run to Koudiet Draouche on the coast of Mediterranean Sea. The 285 kilometres (177 mi) offshore section with two legs would be laid between Koudiet Draouche and Porto Botte (CI), Sardinia. The Sardinian section would be planned approximately 300 kilometres (190 mi) from the south to Olbia. The offshore section between Sardinia and Italian mainland is 280 kilometres (170 mi) and the landfall would be Piombino (LI). It would be connected to the existing Italian gas grid in Tuscany.

The exact offshore route should have been selected by Dutch engineering contractor Fugro by July 2008.

As of 2021 project is considered to be shelved.

== Technical features ==
The pipeline diameter would vary between 22 and 48 inches (560 and 1,220 mm). The initial capacity would be 8 billion cubic meters (bcm) of natural gas per annum. Total estimated costs of project are €2 billion. The pipeline was expected to become operational in 2014. The Italian section should have been built by Snam Rete Gas.

== Project company ==
The project company Galsi S.p.A. was incorporated on 29 January 2003 in Milan. The current shareholders of Galsi are:

- Sonatrach (Algeria) - 41.6%
- Edison S.p.A. (Italy) - 20.8%
- Enel (Italy) - 15.6%
- Sfirs (Sardinia Autonomous Region) - 11.6%
- Hera Trading (Italy) - 10.4%

According to the agreement between Sonatrach and Russian Gazprom, it would have been possible for Gazprom to have a stake in the Galsi pipeline.

== See also ==
- Trans-Mediterranean Pipeline
- Greenstream pipeline
