= Oil reserves in Cuba =

Oil reserves located in Cuba

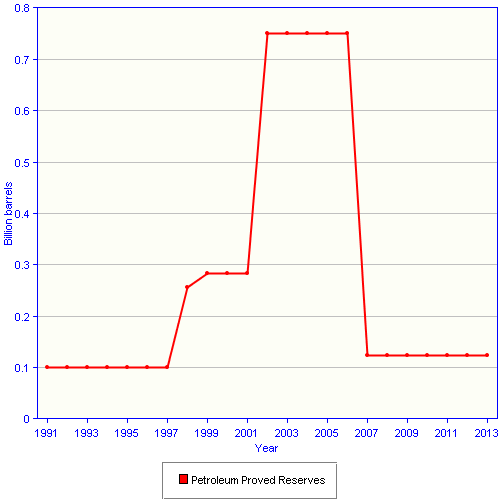
Cuban proved crude oil reserves

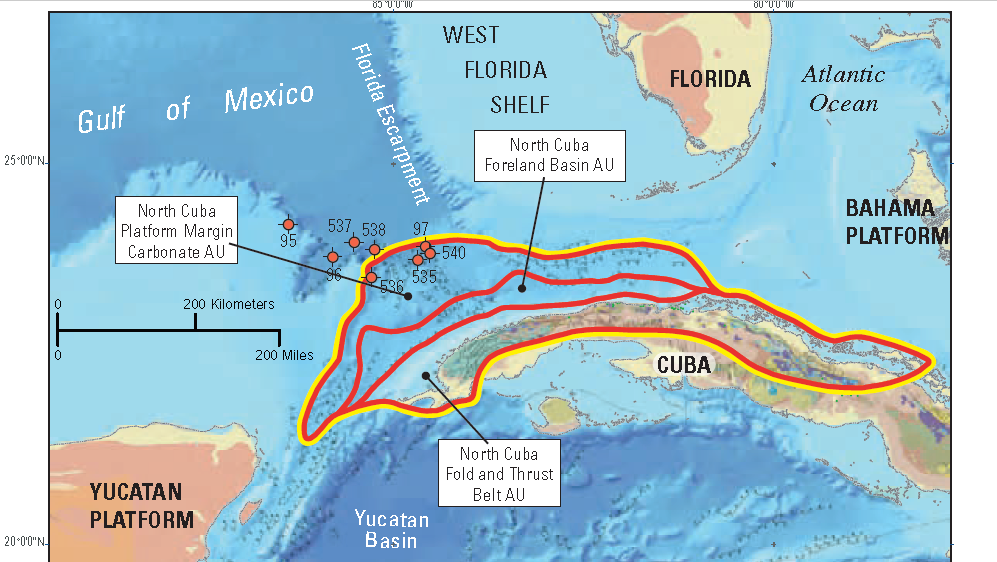
North Cuba Basin geologic regimes

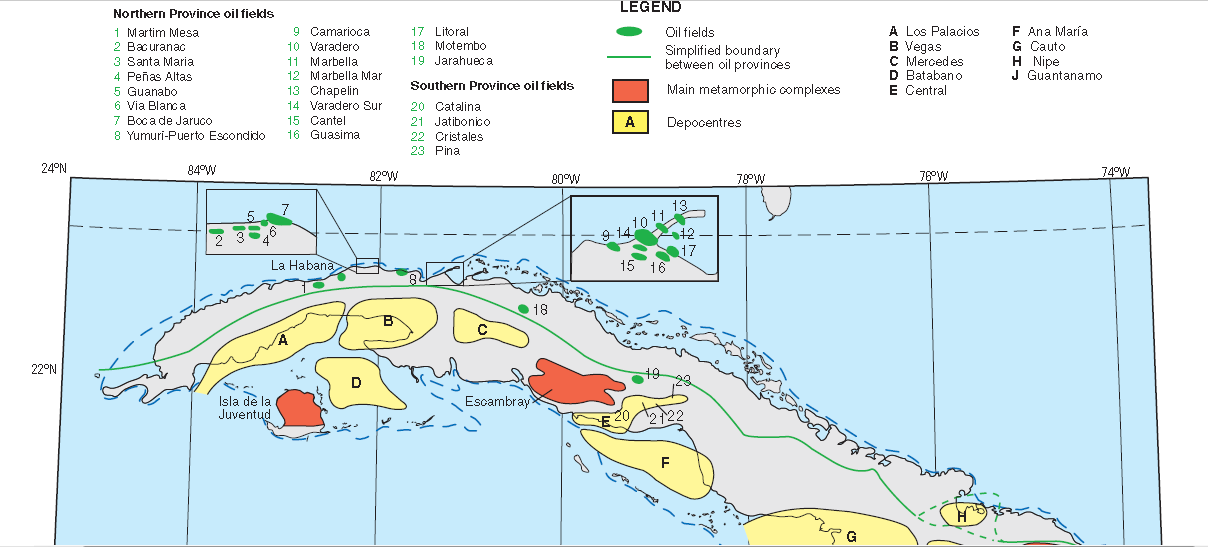
North Cuba oil fields

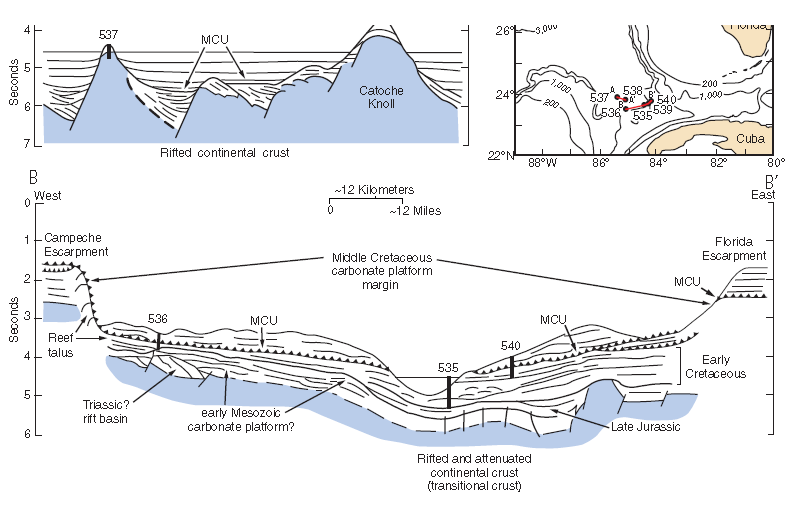
North Cuba Basin cross sections

Estimates of total oil reserves in Cuba are varied, and depend mainly on estimations of undiscovered offshore deposits in the North Cuba Basin. Proved crude oil reserves were 124 million barrels as of 2013.

Cuba has three producing offshore oil fields within 5 km of its north coast.

A 2004 partnership between Spanish oil company Repsol-YPF and Cuba's state oil company Cupet estimated Cuba's off-shore reserves to be able to ultimately produce between 4.6 and 9.3 billion barrels of crude oil. Also in 2004, the U.S. Geological Survey estimated that the North Cuba Basin had a 95% probability of having at least 1.1 billion barrels, and a 5% chance of having 9.4 billion barrels; the most likely volume was 4.6 billion barrels of undiscovered oil.

In October 2008, the Cuban government announced that its likely oil reserves were more than double that which was previously believed, and its total reserves were probably 20 billion barrels, mostly in the offshore. If the estimates are accurate, then Cuba would have one of the top 20 reserves in the world.

By 2010 an active leasing program for blocks of the ocean floor north and west of Cuba was underway. No U.S. companies participated due to the United States embargo against Cuba. Private companies and state-owned firms, from Brazil, India, Norway, Russia, Spain, Venezuela, Vietnam took leases. Despite the areas leased being close to tourist areas in Florida and Cuba, Cuba does not have the equipment or expertise to handle a major oil spill.

== Petroleum exploration ==
In 2012, three deepwater (more than 300 meters of water) exploration wells were drilled by the Italian platform Scarabeo 9 (owned by Saipem, for different oil companies : one for Repsol was finished in May, one for Petronas and Gazpromneft, finished in August, and finally one for PdVSA, finished in late October. None of the three found commercial quantity of oil or gas, which jeopardized Cuba's hope to find hydrocarbons to boost its economy, and prompted Repsol to relinquish its concessions in this country The planned departure of the only deep-water drilling rig available in the fall of 2012 set the detailed exploration program necessary back for a period of years. There remain unexplored deep-water leases held by Vietnamese and Angolan firms and drilling was planned on a shallow-water prospect east of Havana by Zarubezhneft, a Russian company, using a Norwegian rig.
