= Saipem Nigeria =

- Company type: Subsidiary
- Industry: Energy services
- Headquarters: Lagos, Nigeria
- Parent: Saipem

Saipem Nigeria is the Nigerian subsidiary company of Saipem. It offers a range of services to the Oil & Gas Industry such as Drilling On/Offshore, construction activities on/offshore (pipelines, power plants, fabrication activities) Engineering, Maintenance.

It is the EPIC/EPC Contractor with head offices in Lagos and New operational Base in Port Harcourt (Rumulumeni area).

Saipem is under trial in Italy over charges relating to bribery in Nigeria.
