= Scarabeo 8 =

Semi-submersible drilling rig

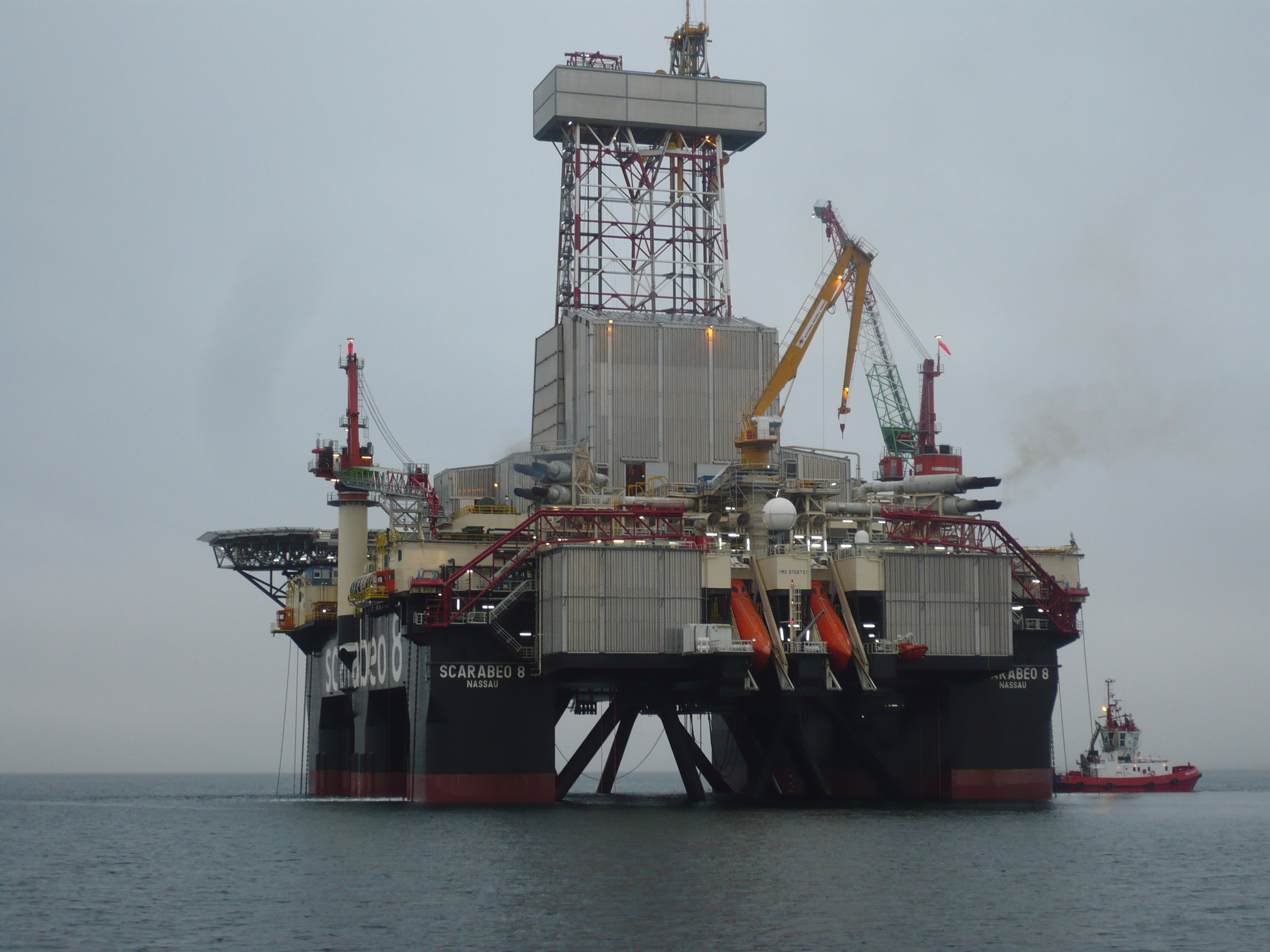
- Scarabeo 8 in Norway, 2012.

History
- Name: Scarabeo 8
- Owner: Saipem
- Operator: Saipem
- Port of registry: Nassau, Bahamas
- Builder: Sevmash; Fincantieri; Westcon
- Laid down: 27 October 2006
- Launched: 1 March 2007
- Completed: 27 April 2012
- In service: 2012
- Identification: Call sign: C6VR7; DNV ID: 26777; IMO number: 8768737; MMSI no.: 308928000
- Status: Operational

General characteristics
- Type: DNV 676–Column-stabilised Unit
- Tonnage: 35,304 GT; 10,592 NT; 14,508 DWT
- Length: 118.65 m (389.3 ft)
- Beam: 72.72 m (238.6 ft)
- Draught: 11.15 m (36.6 ft)
- Depth: 38.65 m (126.8 ft)
- Installed power: 8 C280-16 Caterpillar engines, each rated 5060 KW
- Propulsion: 8 FS 2150-663 Wartsila thrusters, each driven by an electric motor rated 3300 KW
- Speed: 6.4 kn (11.9 km/h; 7.4 mph)
- Crew: 207

Scarabeo 8 is an ultra deepwater 6th generation semi-submersible drilling rig. It is owned and operated by Saipem. The vessel is registered in Nassau, Bahamas.

== Description ==
Scarabeo 8 is an ultra deepwater 6th generation semi-submersible drilling rigs. It is designed by Moss Maritime and its design type is CS50 MKII. The rig is able to operate at the water depth up to 10,000 feet (3,000 m), which is classified by the oil industry as "ultra-deepwater", and its drilling depth is 10,660 metres (34,970 ft). It is able to perform drilling operations at the air temperature of −20–45 °C (−4–113 °F) and water temperature of 0–32 °C (32–90 °F).

Scarabeo 8 has a length of 118.65 metres (389.3 ft) and a breadth of 72.72 metres (238.6 ft). Its height to the drill floor is 57.15 metres (187.5 ft), height to the upper deck is 45.65 metres (149.8 ft), and height to the main deck is 38.65 metres (126.8 ft). Its designed draught at operation is 23.50 metres (77.1 ft) and designed draught at transit is 9.85 metres (32.3 ft). Its gross tonnage is 35,304, dead weight tonnage 14,508, and net tonnage 10,592 tonnes. It is self-propelling having a maximum speed up to 8 knots (15 km/h; 9.2 mph) and an average speed of 6.4 knots (11.9 km/h; 7.4 mph). The vessel is made up of two hulls, six columns and a main deck where the drilling plant and platform services are installed. It has 128 single cabins for accommodation. With some doubles, allowing for 140 personnel in total. The rig is equipped with two deck cranes and one knuckle boom. It also has a helideck suitable for Sikorsky S-61N and Sikorsky S-92 helicopters.

== Construction and delivery ==
The rig was ordered on 10 June 2005. Its hull was built at the Sevmash yard in Severodvinsk, Russia.

In 2007, the hull was moved to the shipyard in Palermo, Italy where Fincantieri carried out topsides construction. On 24 June 2010, a fire incident took place when the fire started in the ventilation system. The fire was believed to be an act of sabotage by workers. No one was hurt in the incident. However, as a result of this incident, the rig needed massive replacement of pipes, heating, ventilation, and air conditioning systems, steel details and paint. About 120 kilometres (75 mi) of cables were replaced.

After that incident Scarabeo 8 was moved from the Fincantieri yard in Italy to Norway for repairs and final completion. In this voyage it was towed by two tow boats. The rig was winterized for working in Arctic conditions and commissioned in the Westcon yard in Ølensvåg. The rig went through a sea trial period in the beginning of 2012. It was christened on 3 April 2012.

Originally, the rig was to be ready in the third quarter of 2009. However, due to different accidents and delays it was commissioned only in 2012. The license to drill in Norwegian waters was delayed several times due to non-conformities with Norwegian regulations. Non-conformities were found in areas such as the management system for use of lifting equipment, offshore cranes for pipe handling, emergency operation of lifting appliances, access to electrical equipment, safety barriers, storage facility for helicopter fuel, as well as design-related issues covering materials handling and working environment. In October 2011, a contract worker working at the construction was killed by a fatal accident.

== Operations ==
The first well to drill by Scarabeo 8 is at the Statoil-operated Odden prospect in the North Sea. After that, the rig will drill at the Eni-operated Salina and Bonna prospects in the Barents Sea before starting drilling at the Eni-operated Goliat field.

On 4 September 2012 the rig, drilling at the Salina prospect, was reported as having a 5.7-degree list caused by seawater coming into the ballast water tank.
