= Taisun =

Made by Yandina Raffles

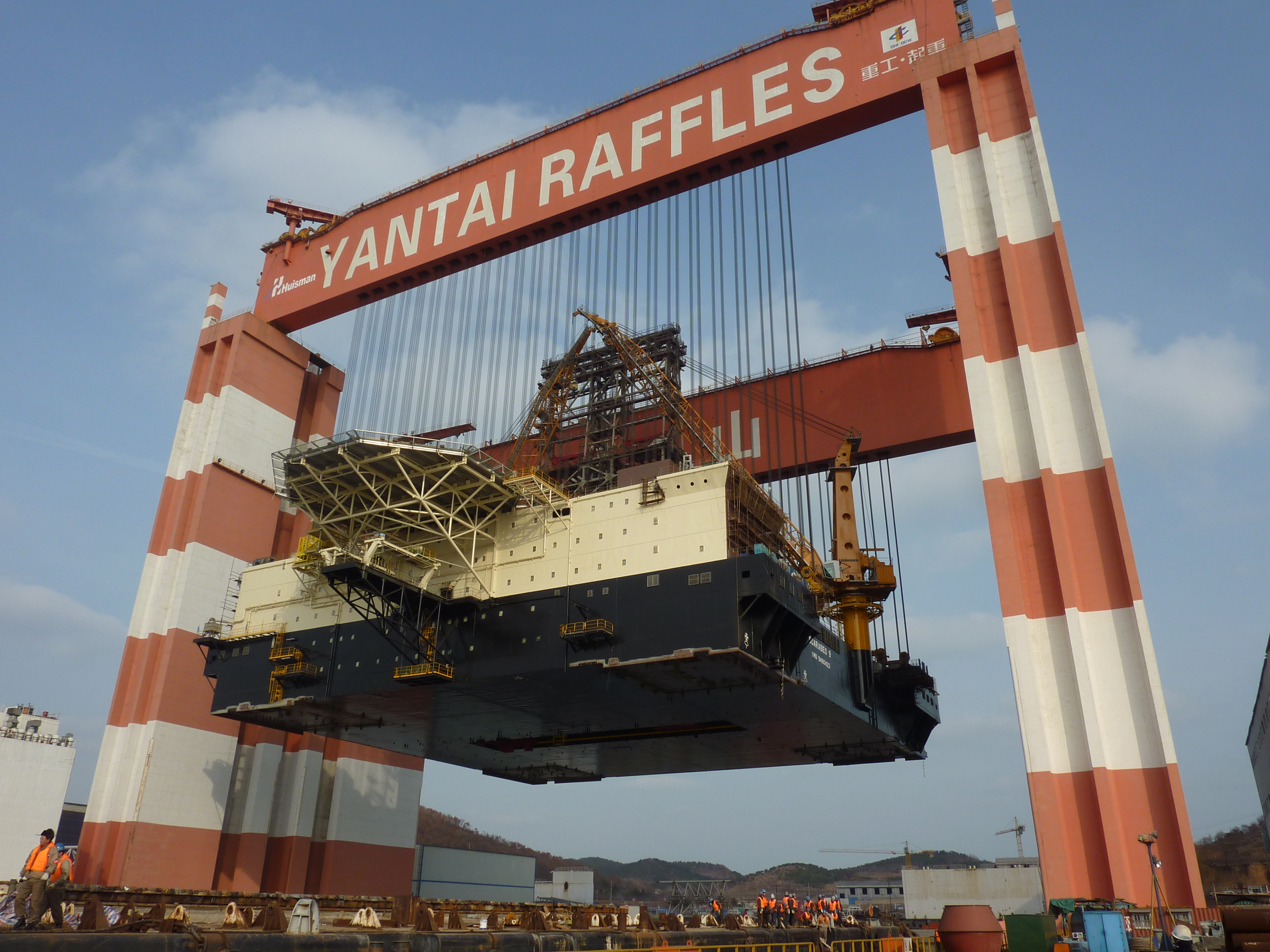
Taisun lifts the 17,100-ton deck box of the Scarabeo 9 semi-submersible.

Taisun (Chinese: 泰山; pinyin: tàishān; Taishan) is a gantry crane with a safe working load of 20,000 metric tons (22,046 short tons). Taisun was designed by DHHI (Dalian Huarui Heavy Industry) and built for the installation of very large modules in semi submersibles and FPSO projects. It is located at Yantai Raffles Shipyard in Yantai, Shandong Province, China. The gantry crane holds the record for the heaviest weight lifted by a crane.

The amount of wire required to operate Taisun is nearly 50,000 meters or just over 31 miles, allowing it to lift a maximum of 80 meters.

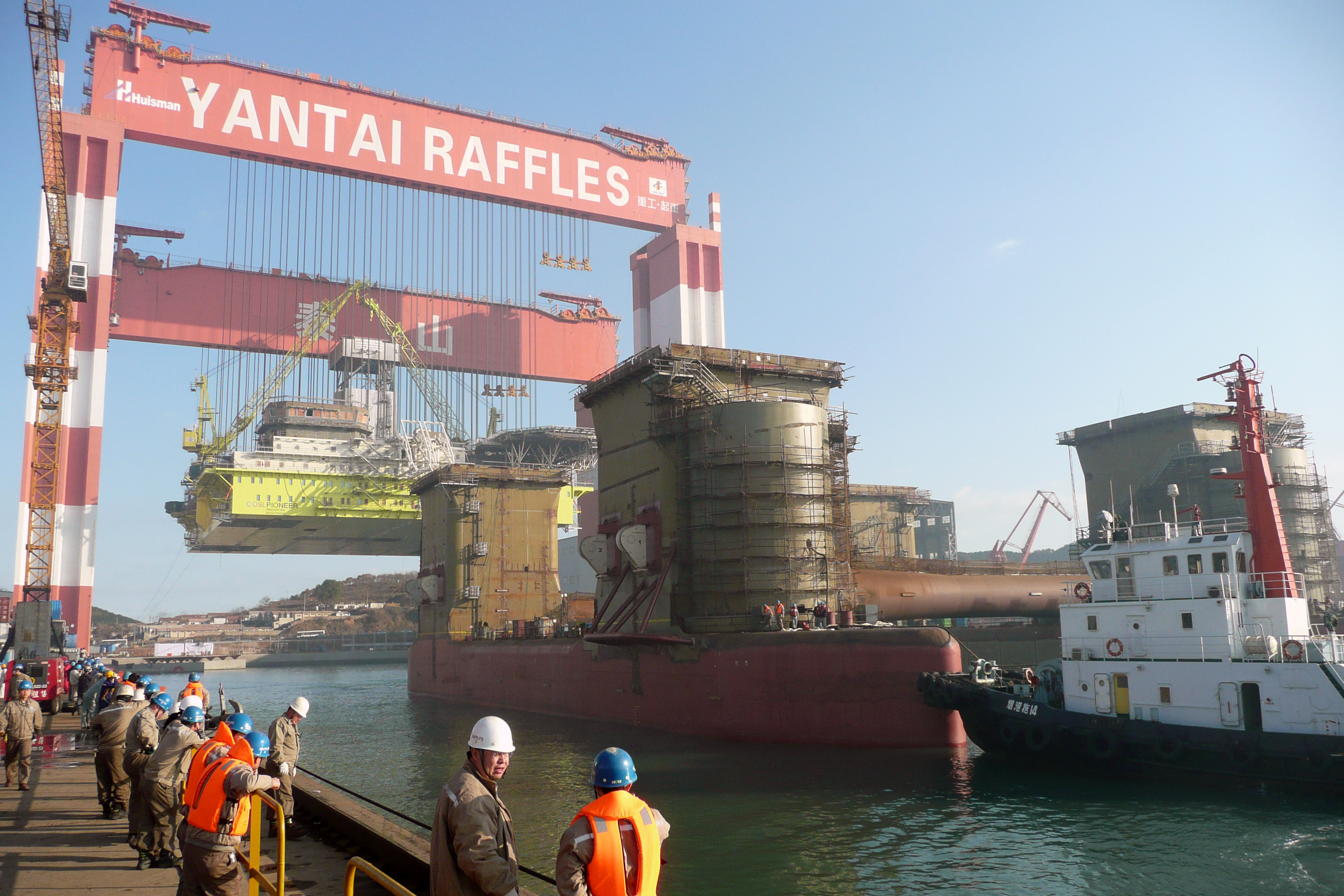
Taisun seen lifting the 14,000-ton deck box of the COSL Pioneer drilling semi-submersible.

== Concept ==
Taisun was built to install very large (up to 20,000 tons) integrated modules on top of a vessel's hull. Traditionally, offshore vessels such as drilling semi submersibles or FPSOs were built from the ground up in modules of 1000 to 2000 tons, which meant that much installation, hook up and commissioning work was left to be done on board where access is limited and efficiency is decreased.

Taisun facilitates simultaneous construction of the lower and upper parts of the vessel which allows for a shorter overall project schedule, manpower improvements of up to two million man-hours while safety and quality levels are improved.

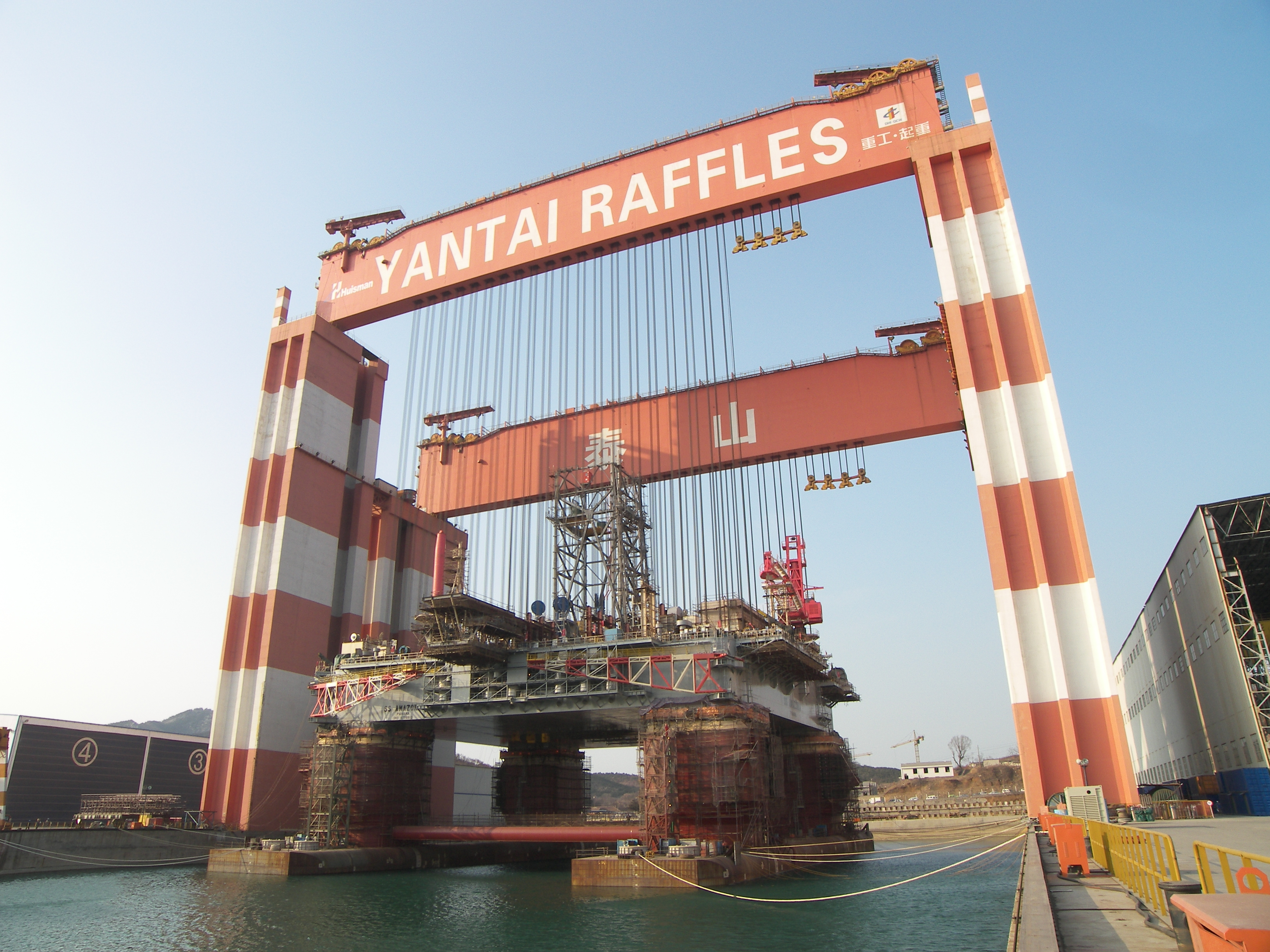
Taisun with the now-complete SS Amazonia drilling semi-submersible.

== Lift Record ==
The Guinness World Records state that Taisun holds the world record for "heaviest weight lifted by crane", set on April 18, 2008 at 20,133 metric tonnes (44,385,667.25 lb) by lifting a barge special ballasted with water. However, its lift capacity was surpassed when the Honghai Crane was completed in 2014, with a lift capacity at 22,000 tonnes.

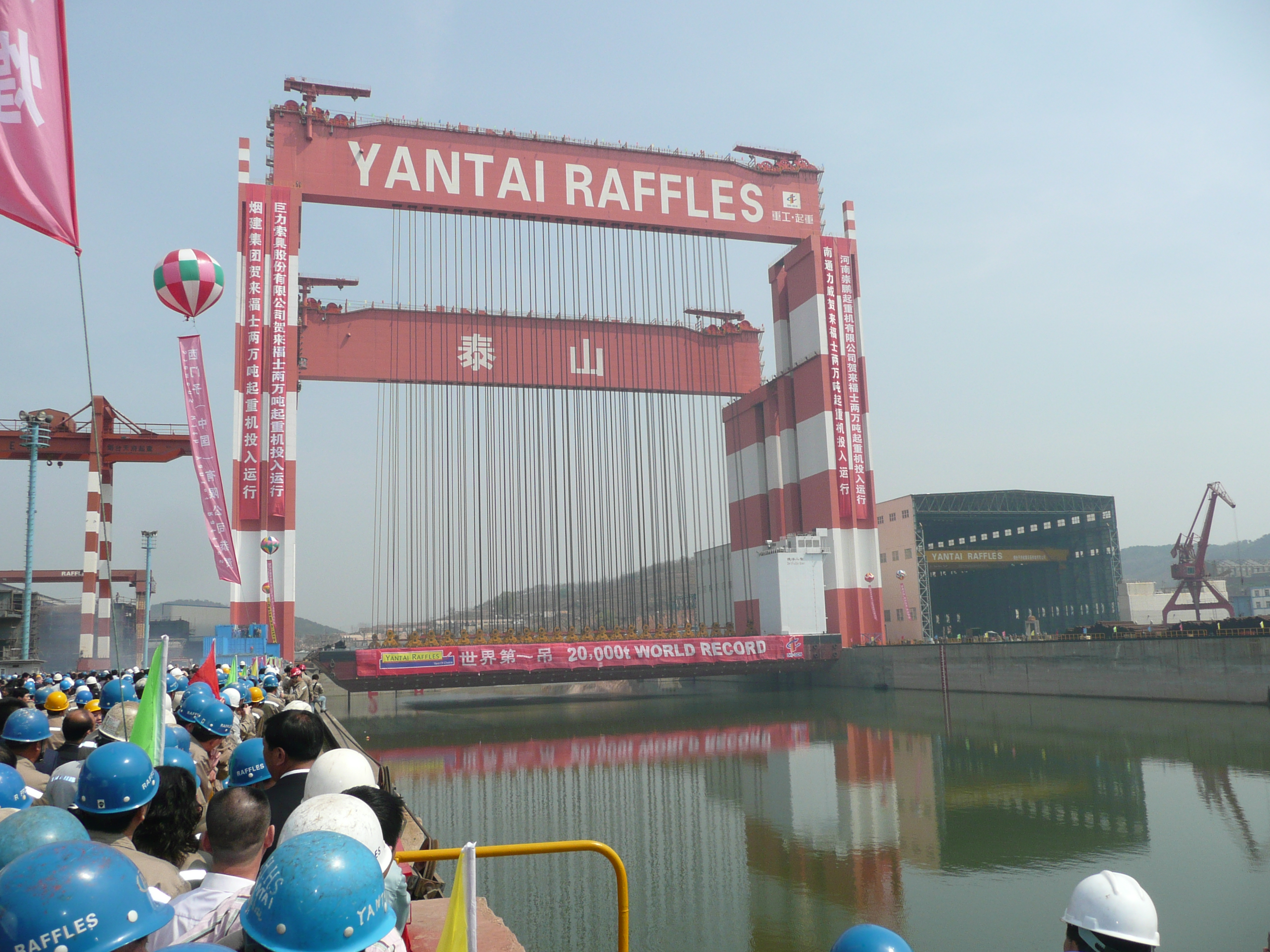
Taisun setting the heavy lift world record at 20,133 metric tons

== Particulars ==
Safe Working Load	20,133 metric tons
Height	133 meters
Span	120 meters
Maximum lift height	80 meters
Dry dock length	380 meters
Wire rope length	50,000 meters
