= Gantry crane =

Type of overhead crane used in industrial environments

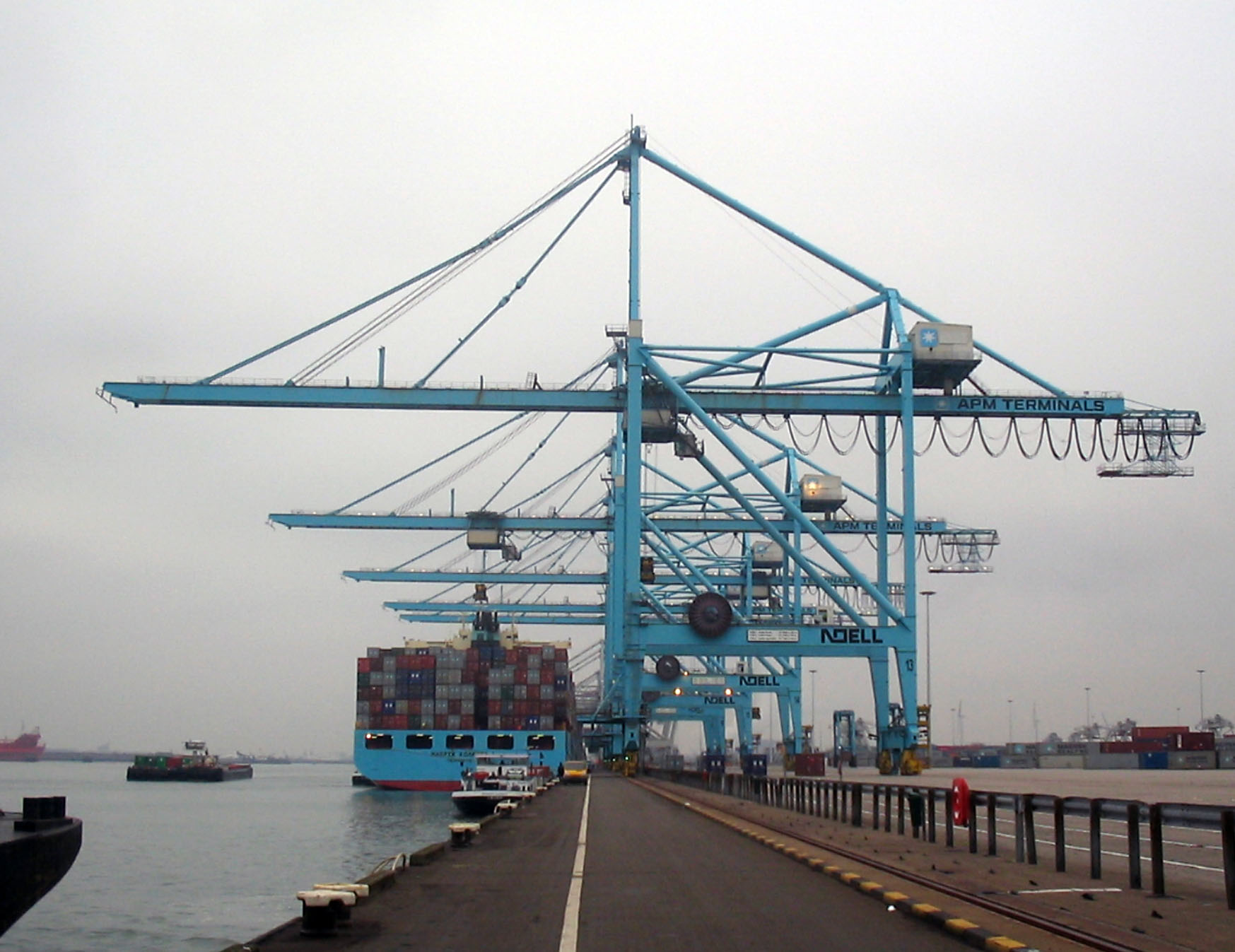
Side-view of Super-PostPanamax portainer crane at the APM Terminal in the Port of Rotterdam

A gantry crane is a crane built atop a gantry, which is a structure used to straddle an object or workspace. They can range from enormous "full" gantry cranes, capable of lifting some of the heaviest loads in the world, to small shop cranes, used for tasks such as lifting automobile engines out of vehicles. They are also called portal cranes, the "portal" being the empty space straddled by the gantry.

The terms gantry crane and overhead crane (or bridge crane) are often used interchangeably, as both types of crane straddle their workload. The distinction most often drawn between the two is that with gantry cranes, the entire structure (including gantry) is usually wheeled (often on rails). By contrast, the supporting structure of an overhead crane is fixed in location, often in the form of the walls or ceiling of a building, to which is attached a movable hoist running overhead along a rail or beam (which may itself move). Further confusing the issue is that gantry cranes may also incorporate a movable beam-mounted hoist in addition to the entire structure being wheeled, and some overhead cranes are suspended from a freestanding gantry.

== Variants ==
=== Ship-to-shore (STS) gantry crane ===
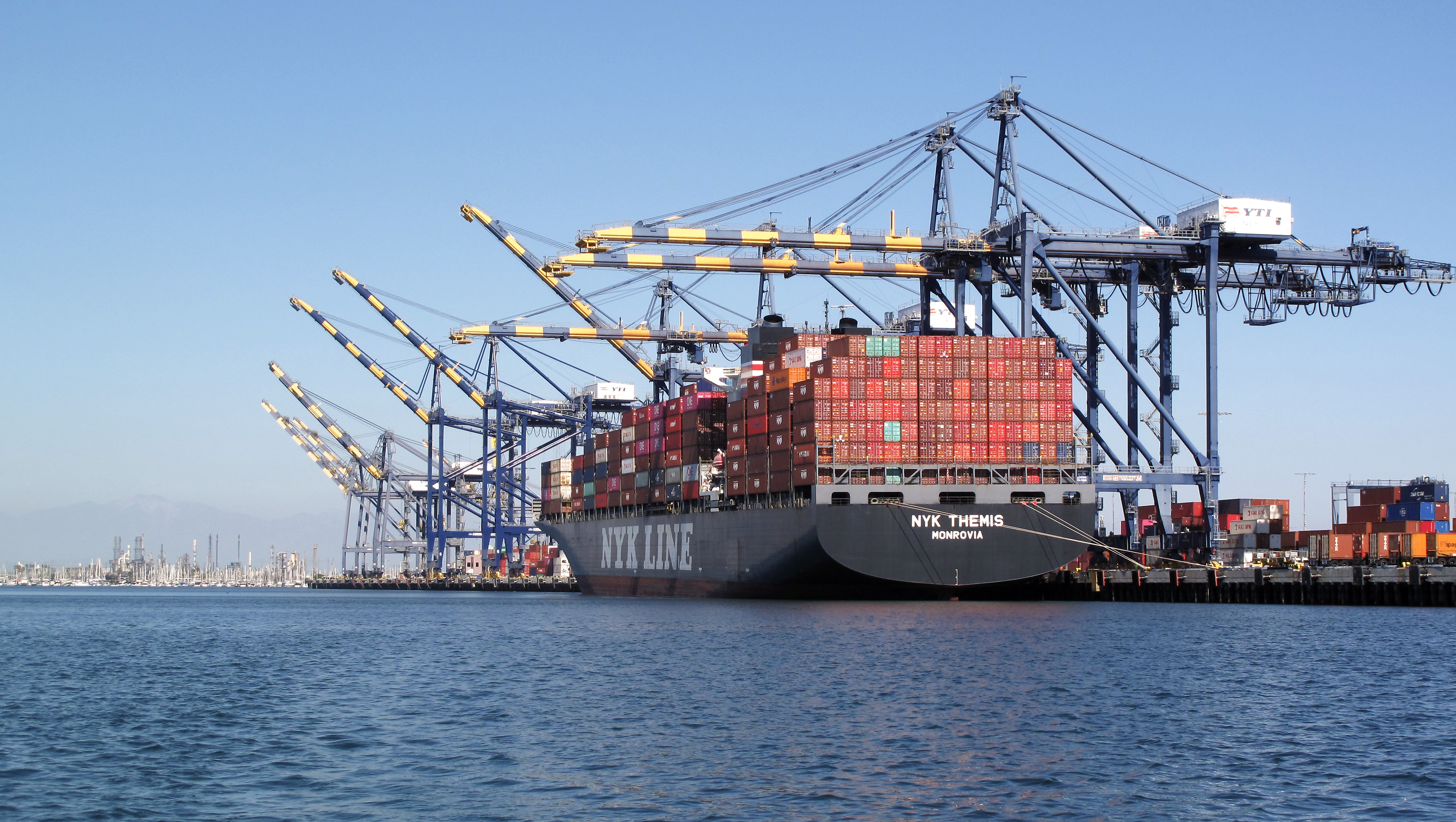
Paceco-Mitsui STS cranes at the Port of Los Angeles. Paceco first produced this type of cranes in 1959.

Ship-to-shore gantry cranes are imposing, multi-story structures prominent at most container terminals, used to load intermodal containers on and off container ships. They operate along two rails (waterside and landside designations) spaced based on the size of crane to be used.

Ship-to-shore crane elements

Lateral movement system:

A combination of two sets of typically ten rail wheels. The lateral movement is controlled by a cabin along the landside wheel. During any lateral movement, lights and sirens operate to ensure safety of the crew operating adjacent to the crane. The wheels are mounted to the bottom of the vertical frame/bracing system.

Vertical frame and braces:

A structurally designed system of beams assembled to support the boom, cabin, operating machinery, and the cargo being lifted. They display signage describing restrictions, requirements and identifiers.

Crane boom:

A horizontal beam that runs transversely to the berth. It spans from landside of the landside rail wheels to a length over the edge of the berth. The waterside span is based on the size of ship that it can successfully load/unload. Beams also have the ability to be raised for storage purposes.

Hook:

Device which moves vertically to raise and lower cargo as well as horizontally along the boom's length. For container cranes, a spreader is attached to span the container and lock it safely in place during movement.

Operating cabin:

Encased setup with glass paneled flooring for operator to view the cargo being moved. Elevators which are located along vertical frame members are used to get crew up and down from the cabin.

Storage equipment:

For temporary storage options between vessel operations, one steel pin is inserted into anchorage arm dropped from each wheel set into a stow pin assembly. This setup is designed to prevent lateral movement along the rails. During hurricanes and other emergency shut down situations, tie down assemblies are used. Two angled arms are anchored at each end of each set of wheels. This setup prevents longitudinal movement along the rails as well as prevents tipping of the crane due to uplift from high velocity winds.

Ship-to-shore gantry cranes are often used in pairs or teams of cranes in order to minimize the time required to load and unload vessels. As container ship sizes and widths have increased throughout the 20th Century, ship-to-shore gantry cranes and the implementation of those gantry cranes have become more individualized in order to effectively load and unload vessels while maximizing profitability and minimizing time in port. One example are systems where specialized berths are built that accommodate one vessel at a time with ship-to-shore gantry cranes on both sides of the vessel. This allows for more cranes and double the workspace under the cranes to be used for transporting cargo off dock.

The first quayside container gantry crane was developed in 1959 by Paceco Corporation.

=== Full gantry crane ===
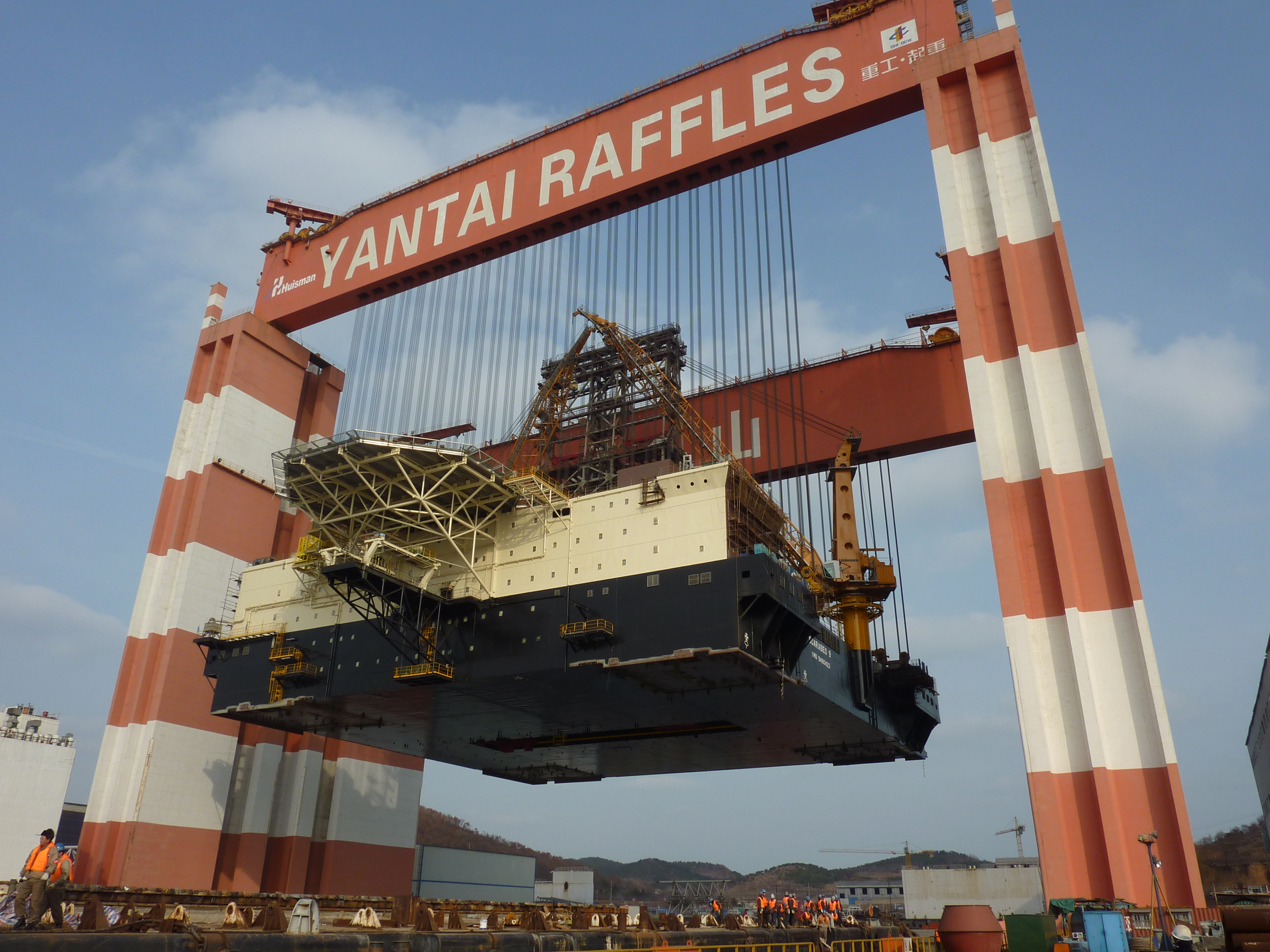
Taisun, the world's strongest gantry crane, at Yantai Raffles Shipyard, Yantai, China

Full gantry cranes (where the load remains beneath the gantry structure, supported from a beam) are well suited to lifting massive objects such as ships' engines, as the entire structure can resist the torque created by the load, and counterweights are generally not required. These are often found in shipyards where they are used to move large ship components together for construction. They use a complex system of cables and attachments to support the massive loads undertaken by the full gantry cranes.

Some full gantry cranes of note are Samson and Goliath and Taisun. Samson and Goliath are two full gantry cranes located in the Harland and Wolff shipyard in Belfast. They have spans of 140 metres (460 ft) and can lift loads of up to 840 tonnes (830 long tons; 930 short tons) to a height of 70 metres (230 ft). In 2008, the world's strongest gantry crane, Taisun, which can lift 20,000 tonnes (19,700 long tons; 22,000 short tons), was installed in Yantai, China at the Yantai Raffles Shipyard. In 2012, a 22,000-tonne (21,700-long-ton; 24,300-short-ton) capacity crane, the "Honghai Crane" was planned for construction in Qidong City, China and was finished in 2014.

=== Rubber-tyred gantry (RTG) crane ===
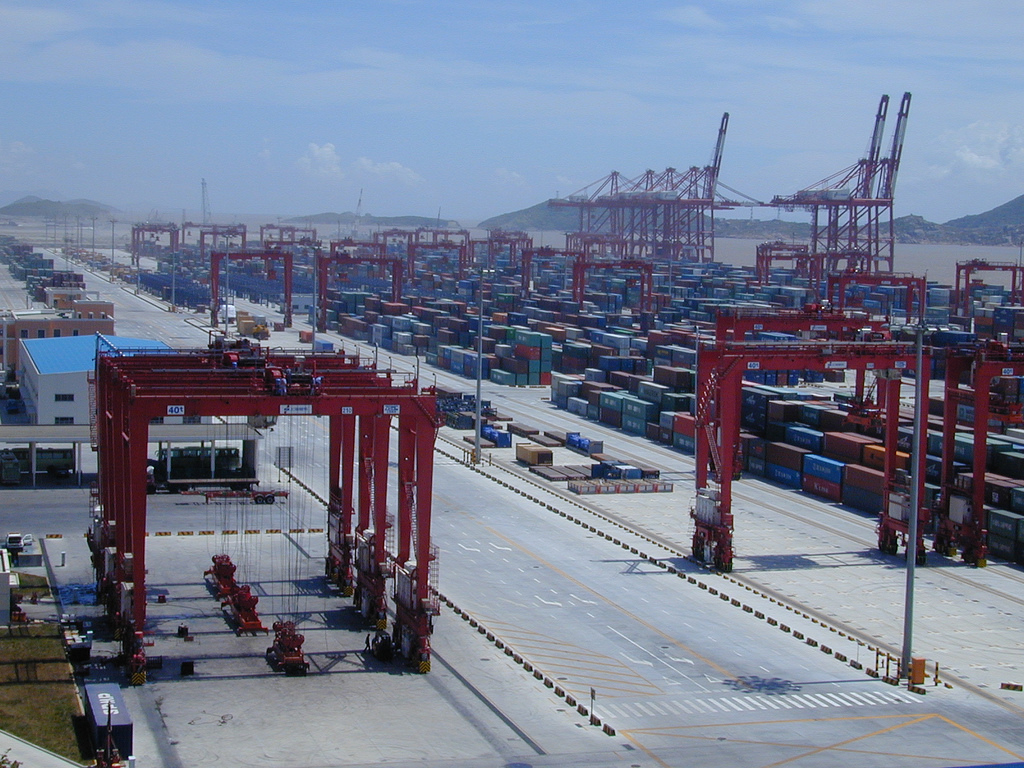
Rubber tyred gantry cranes in the foreground, ship-to-shore gantries background right, at Port of Shanghai

Smaller gantry cranes are also available running on rubber tyres so that tracks are not needed. Rubber tyred gantry cranes are essential for moving containers from berths throughout the rest of the yard. For this task they come in large sizes, as pictured to the left, that are used for moving to straddle multiple lanes of rail, road, or container storage. They also are capable of lifting fully loaded containers to great heights. Smaller rubber tyred gantry cranes come in the form of straddle carriers which are used when moving individual containers or vertical stacks of containers. Portable gantry crane systems, such as rubber tyred gantry cranes, are in high demand in terminals and ports restricted in size and reliant on maximizing vertical space and not needing to haul containers long distances. This is due to the relatively slow speed yet high reach of rubber tyred gantry cranes when compared to other forms of container terminal equipment.

=== Portable gantry crane (PGC) ===
Portable gantry cranes are used to lift and transport smaller items, usually less than 10 tonnes (9.8 long tons; 11 short tons). They are widely used in the HVAC, machinery moving and fine art installation industries. Some portable gantry cranes are equipped with an enclosed track, while others use an I-beam, or other extruded shapes, for the running surface. Most workstation gantry cranes are intended to be stationary when loaded, and mobile when unloaded. Workstation Gantry Cranes can be outfitted with either a wire rope hoist or a lower capacity chain hoist.

== Gallery ==
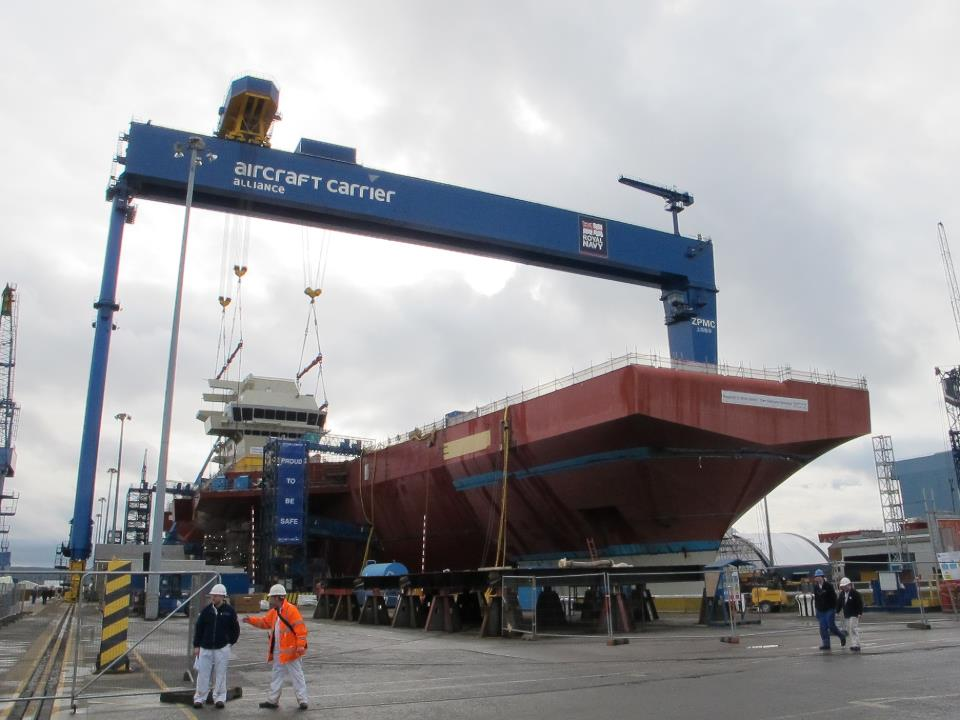
A ZPMC gantry crane used for construction of the British aircraft carrier HMS Queen Elizabeth

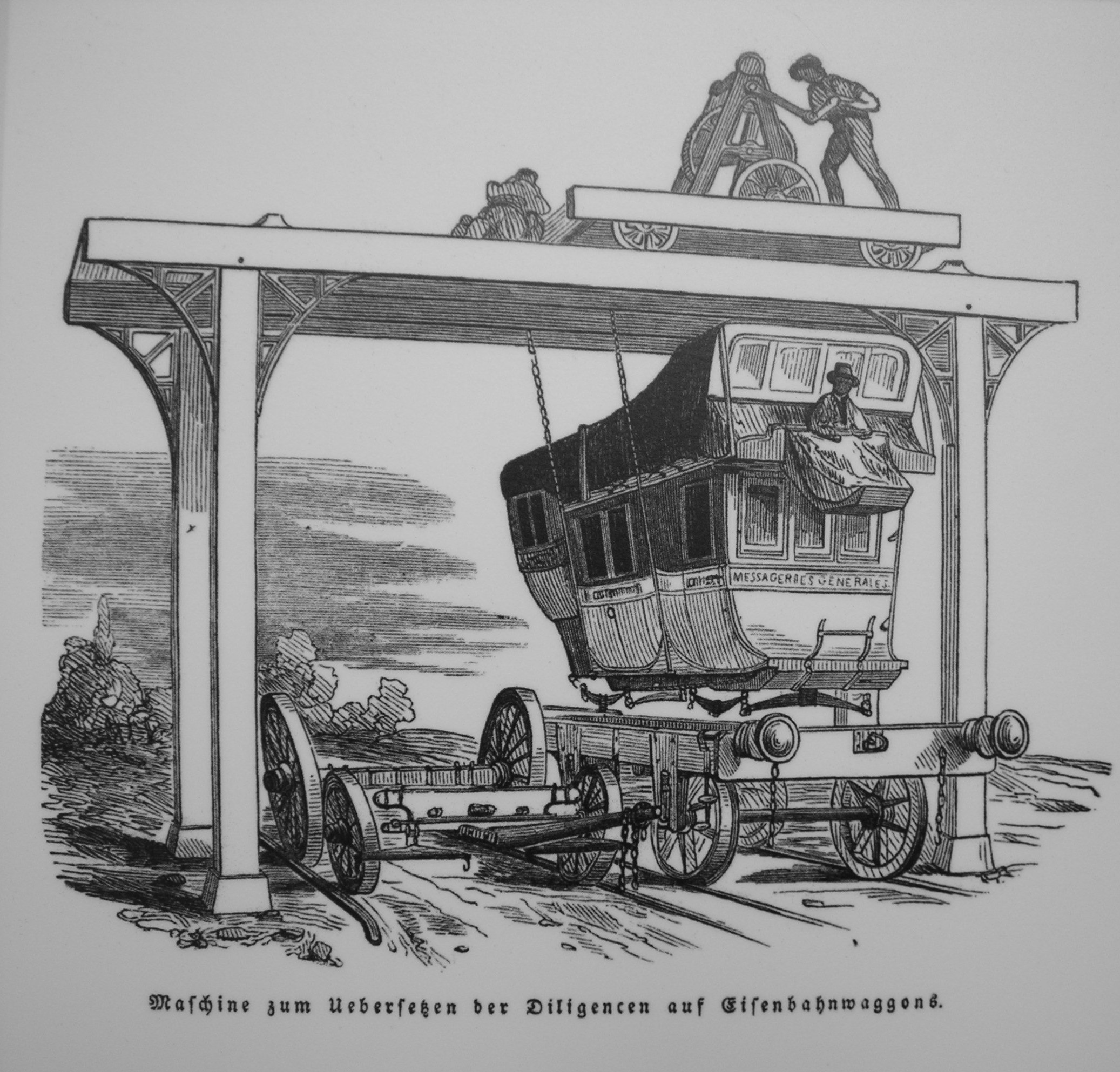
A primitive gantry crane to put a stagecoach on a flat car. The drawing is exhibited in Deutsches Museum Verkehrszentrum, Munich, Germany.

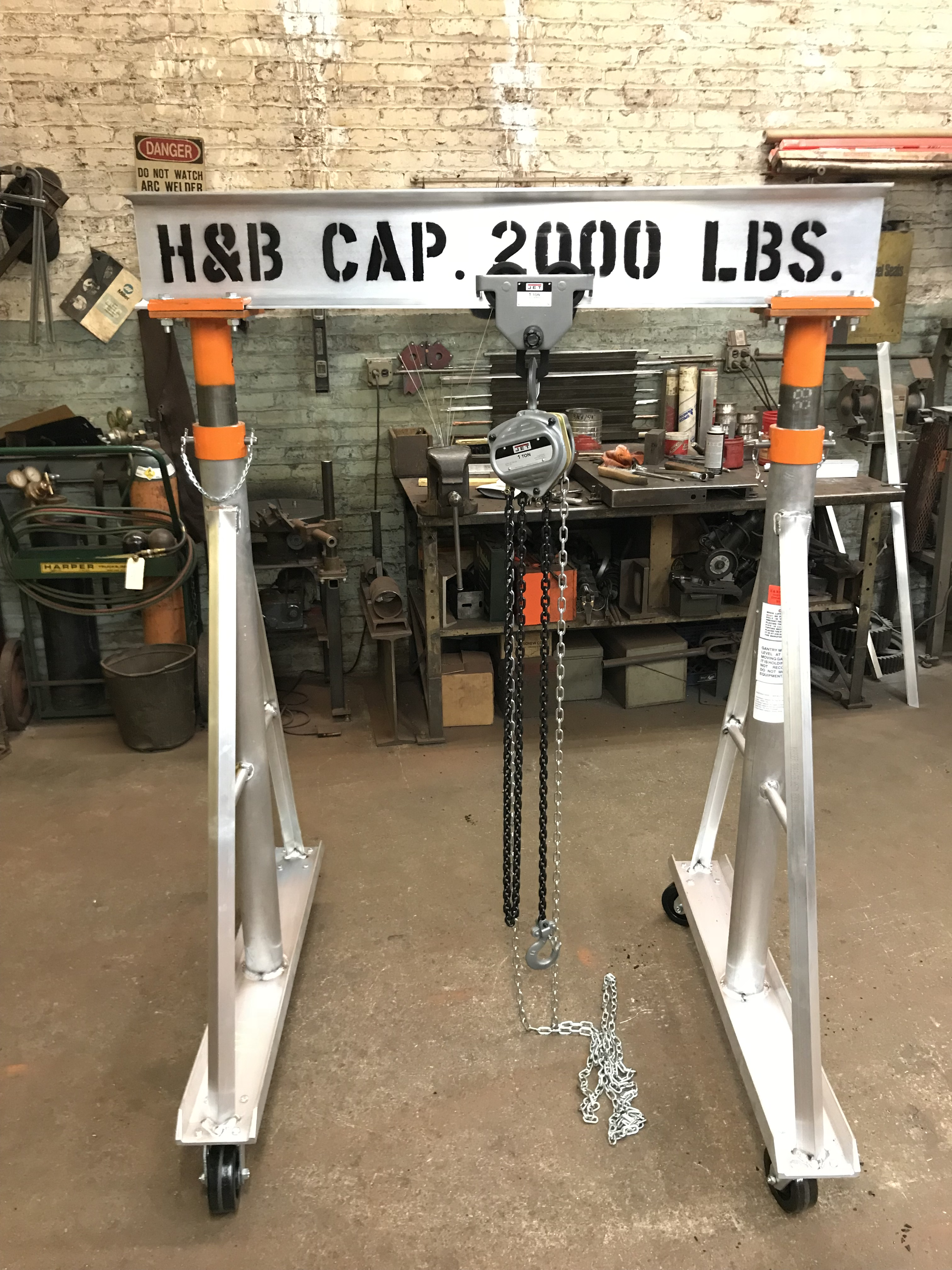
1 short ton (0.89 long tons; 0.91 t) capacity portable gantry crane

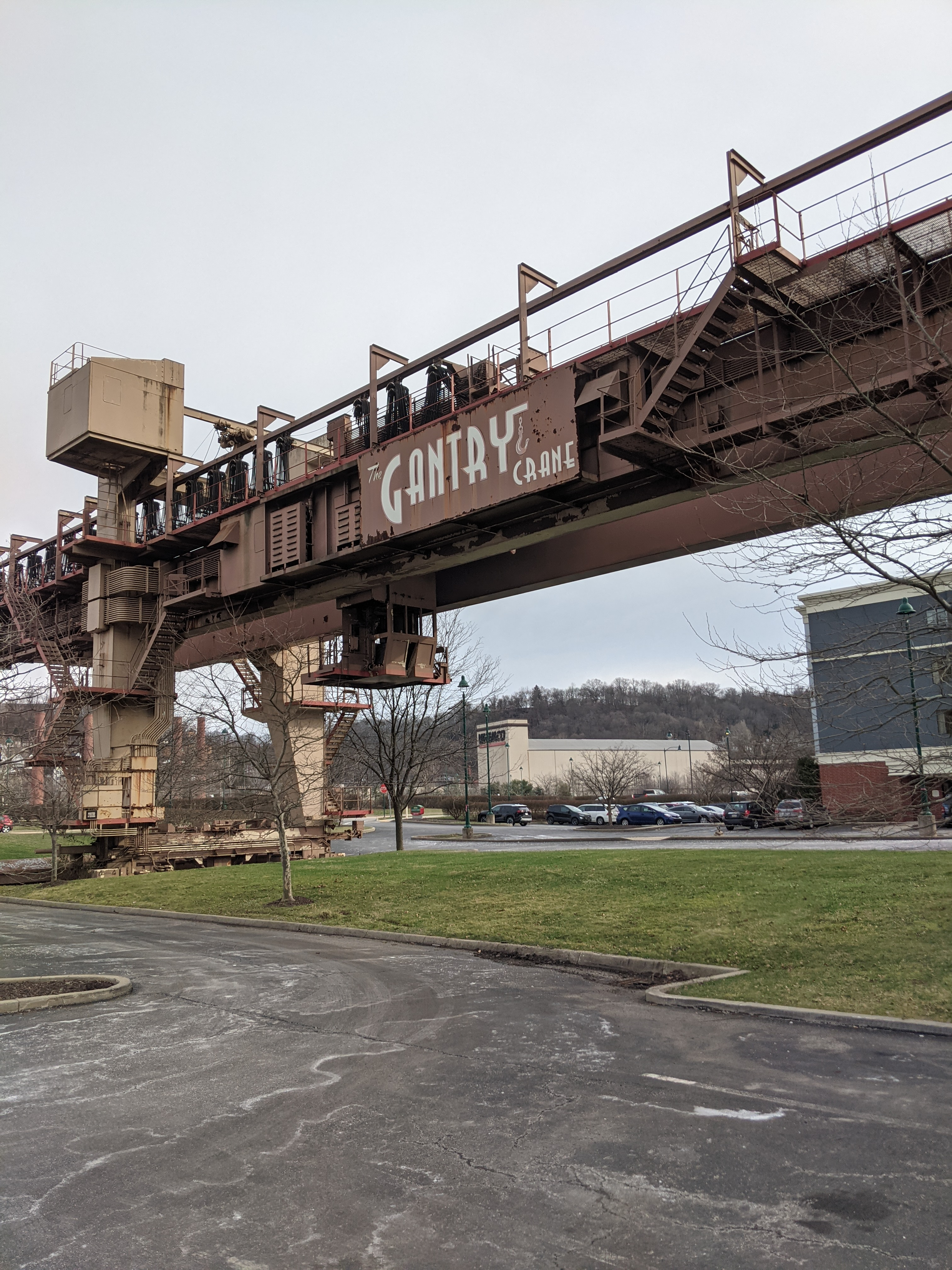
Gantry crane at the site of the Homestead Steel Works in Pennsylvania, U.S.

== See also ==
- Gantry (transport) – Structure on which road signs are mounted
- List of historical harbour cranes
- Straddle carrier – Freight-carrying vehicle
