= Scarabeo 9 =

Semi-submersible drilling rig

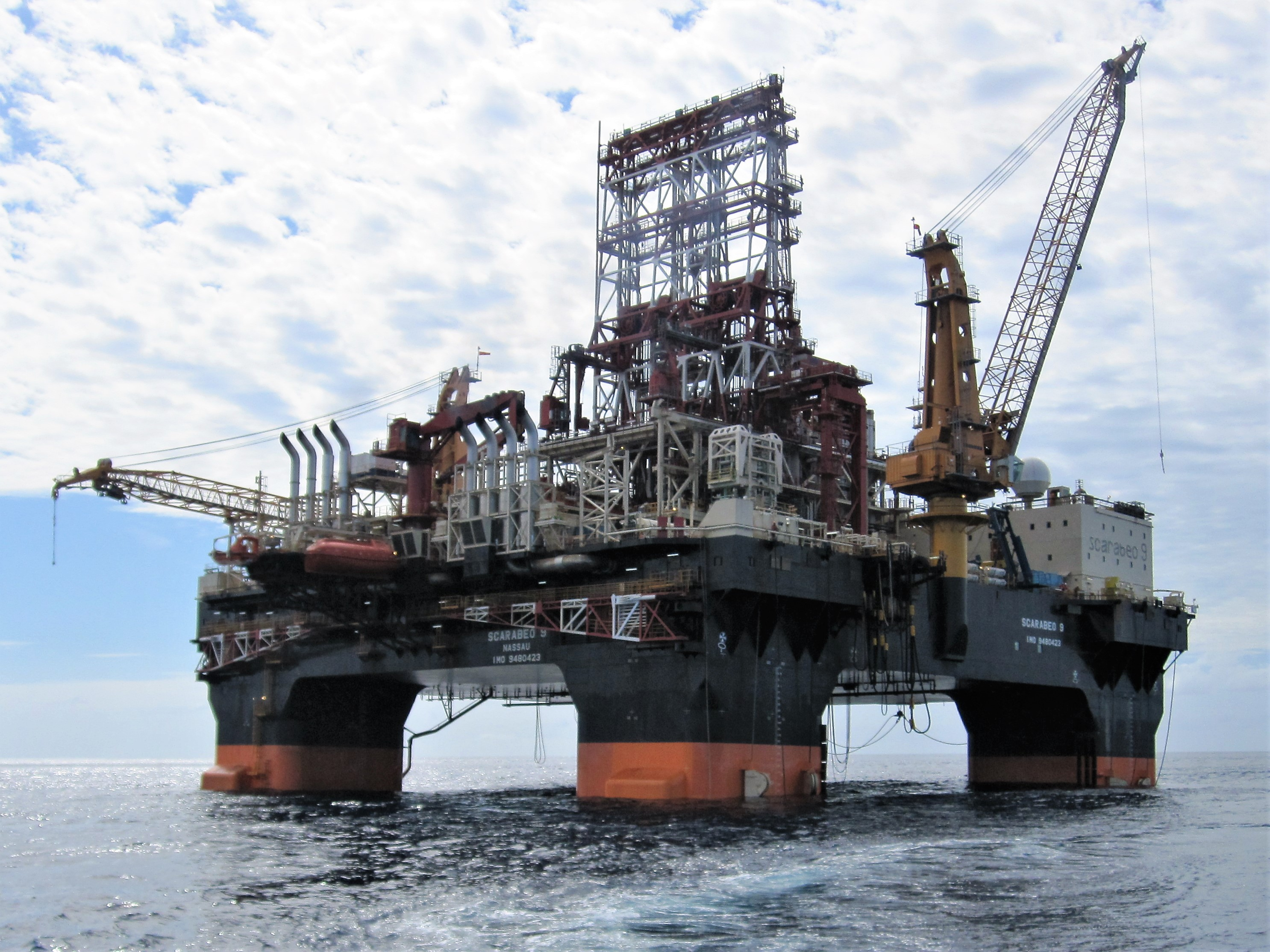
- Scarabeo 9 outside Phuket, Thailand, undergoing sea trials

History
- Name: Scarabeo 9
- Owner: Saipem
- Operator: Saipem
- Port of registry: Nassau, Bahamas
- Builder: Yantai Raffles Shipyard; Keppel FELS
- Cost: US$750 million
- Yard number: YRF-2006-189
- Laid down: 1 April 2008
- Completed: 19 August 2011
- In service: 2011
- Identification: Call sign: C6YV7; DNV ID: 27764; IMO number: 9480423; MMSI no.: 311046800
- Status: Operational

General characteristics
- Type: DNV 676–Column-stabilised Unit
- Tonnage: 23,965 DWT; 36,863 GT; 11,059 NT
- Length: 115 m (377 ft)
- Beam: 78 m (256 ft)
- Draught: 23.6 m (77 ft)
- Depth: 35.4 m (116 ft)
- Propulsion: 8 x Wärtsilä 12V32LNE 7,200 BHP
- Crew: 200

Scarabeo 9 is a Frigstad D90-type ultra deepwater 6th generation semi-submersible drilling rig. It is owned and operated by Saipem. It was named by Anna Tatka, the wife of Pietro Franco Tali, CEO of Saipem. The vessel is registered in Nassau, Bahamas.

== Description ==
Scarabeo 9 is one of the largest offshore drilling rigs in the world. It is the first (and as of 2012 the only) Frigstad Engineering developed Frigstad D90 design rig ever built. The rig is able to operate at the water depth up to 11,811 feet (3,600 m), which is classified by the oil industry as "ultra-deepwater", and its drilling depth is 15,200 metres (49,900 ft). The water depth still suitable for its operations is twice as much as for Deepwater Horizon. The drilling equipment was provided by the Norwegian engineering company Aker Solutions.

Scarabeo 9 has a length of 115 metres (377 ft) and a breadth of 78 metres (256 ft). Its gross tonnage is 36,863, dead weight tonnage 23,965, and net tonnage 11,059 tonnes. The vessel is powered by eight Wärtsilä 12V32 diesel engines. It is equipped with two cranes.

The rig includes quarters for up to 200 workers. There is also a helicopter deck suitable for MI8, S61, and EH101 helicopters. The rig has been described by the industry sources as "the latest technology for deepwater drilling operations."

== Construction and delivery ==
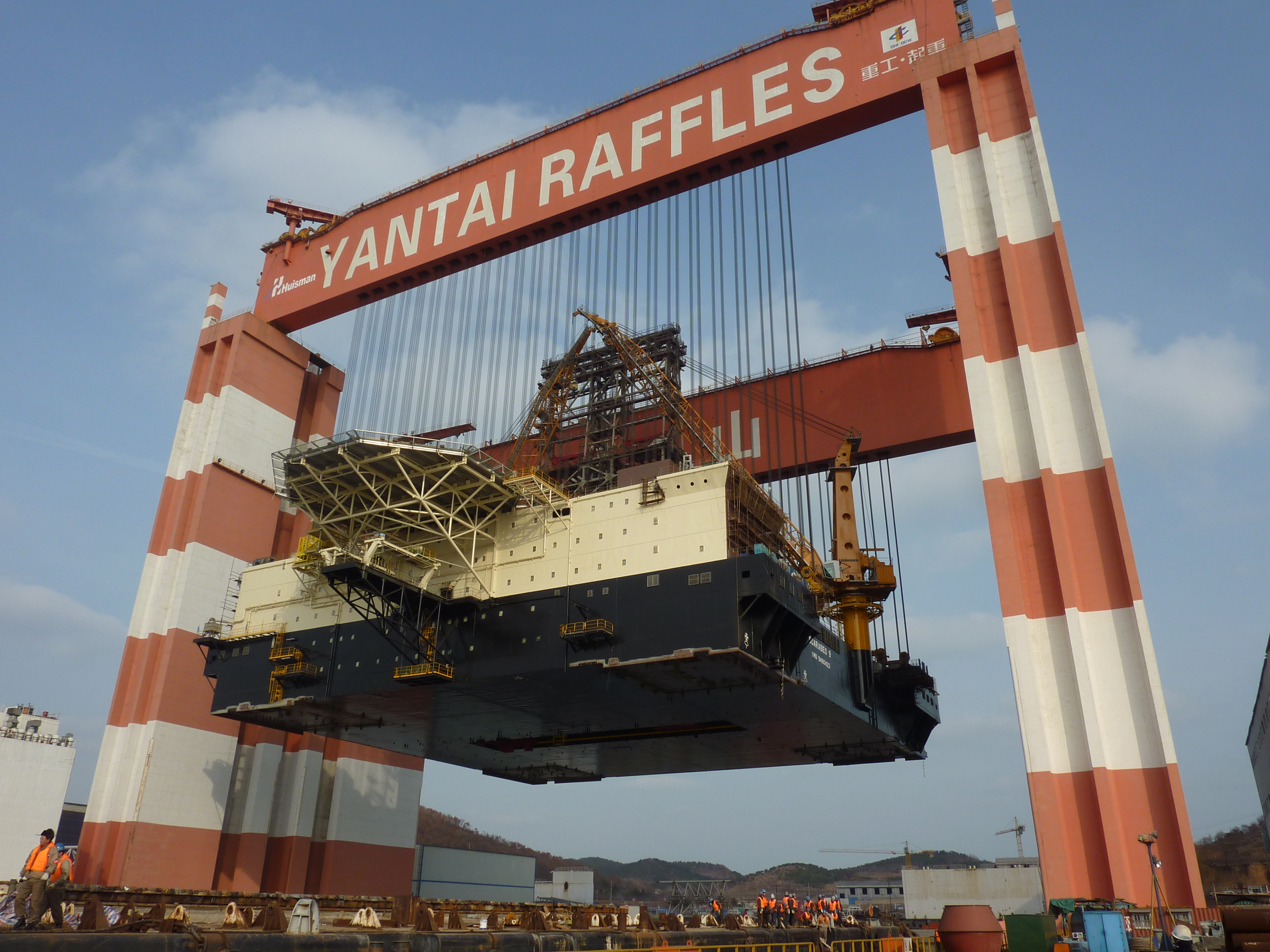
Taisun crane at the Yantai Raffles Shipyard holds the 17,100 metric ton deck box of Scarabeo 9 in the air as the barge is moved out from underneath.

Scarabeo 9 was ordered by Frigstad Offshore, a Singapore based offshore drilling rigs management service company. For this purpose, a special project company Frigstad Discoverer was established in 2006. The original name of the vessel was decided to be Frigstad Oslo. In 2007, the project company was acquired by Italian engineering and offshore services provider company Saipem and it was decided to rename the rig Scarabeo 9.

The rig cost US$750 million to build. It was constructed at the Yantai Raffles Shipyard in Yantai, China. The contract was signed on 5 April 2006, the keel was laid on 1 April 2008, and originally the construction was to be completed in September 2009. After several delays at the Yantai Raffles shipyard it was shipped to the Keppel FELS shipyard in Singapore for the final completion in 2010. The reason of delays was related to a number of orders which were carried out simultaneously at the Yantai Raffles shipyard. Changing shipyards caused additional cost of between US$70 and 100 million. Beside of the Keppel FELS shipyard also the SembCorp Marine's Jurong Shipyard in Singapore was considered for the completion works.

On its way to Singapore, a water leak occurred due to "water raining into the tanks from the top that was not been drained out." The incident caused an extensive inspection to assure its seaworthiness. The main part of Keppel's work involved the completion and commissioning of marine and drilling systems on board.

The rig was delivered to Saipem on 25 August 2011. On her maiden voyage to Cuba, Scarabeo 9 was escorted around the Cape of Good Hope by the Fairmount Marine owned tugboat Fairmount Glacier.

== Compliance with the embargo against Cuba ==
The rig was specifically built for drilling in the waters of Cuba. It is compliant with the United States embargo against Cuba, which limits the amount of American technology that can be used in equipment used there, as less than 10% of its parts are American-made. The news agency Reuters has reported that only the blowout preventer of Scarabeo 9 is manufactured in the United States. This is one of the most critical devices for well control during the offshore drilling as malfunctioning of the blowout preventer was one of the reasons of the Deepwater Horizon explosion. However, due to the United States embargo, the original equipment manufacturer is not allowed to provide spare parts or repair items for the blowout preventer.

On its way to Cuba, in Trinidad it was inspected by the United States Coast Guard and Interior Department (Bureau of Safety and Environmental Enforcement). According to the statement by the Bureau of Safety and Environmental Enforcement, the vessel is generally compliant with existing international and U.S. standards.

== Operation ==
Scarabeo 9 drilled its first well on the Jagüey prospect in the North Cuba Basin for Repsol in the beginning of 2012. Provider of immediate well intervention and other well-related subsea services was Helix Energy Solutions Group. After drilling for Repsol, Scarabeo 9 was contracted to drill for Petronas and Gazprom Neft on the Catoche field off the north coast of Pinar del Río Province, and for Petróleos de Venezuela on the Cabo de San Antonio prospect off the west coast of Cuba. Repsol has also contracted the rig for drilling in Brazil.
