= Saipem =

Italian oil and gas contractor

Saipem S.p.A.
- Type: Società per Azioni
- Traded as: BIT: SPM; FTSE MIB Component
- Industry: Oilfield services
- Founded: 1957
- Founder: Enrico Mattei
- Headquarters: Milan, Italy
- Key people: Puliti Alessandro (CEO); Elisabetta Serafin (Chairman)
- Services: Engineering and construction for offshore and onshore projects; drilling rig, drillship and FPSO operation
- Revenue: ▼€8.526 billion (2018)
- Operating income: ▼€37 million (2018)
- Net income: ▼€-497 million (2018)
- Total assets: ▼€5.028 billion (2018)
- Total equity: ▼€3.962 billion (2018)
- Number of employees: 32,000 (2018)
- Parent: eni
- Website: www.saipem.com

Saipem S.p.A. (Società Azionaria Italiana Perforazioni E Montaggi lit. Drilling and Assembly Italian Public Limited Company) is an Italian multinational oilfield services company and one of the largest in the world. Until 2016 it was a subsidiary of Italian oil and gas supermajor Eni, which retains approximately 30% of Saipem's shares.

== History ==
=== Early history ===
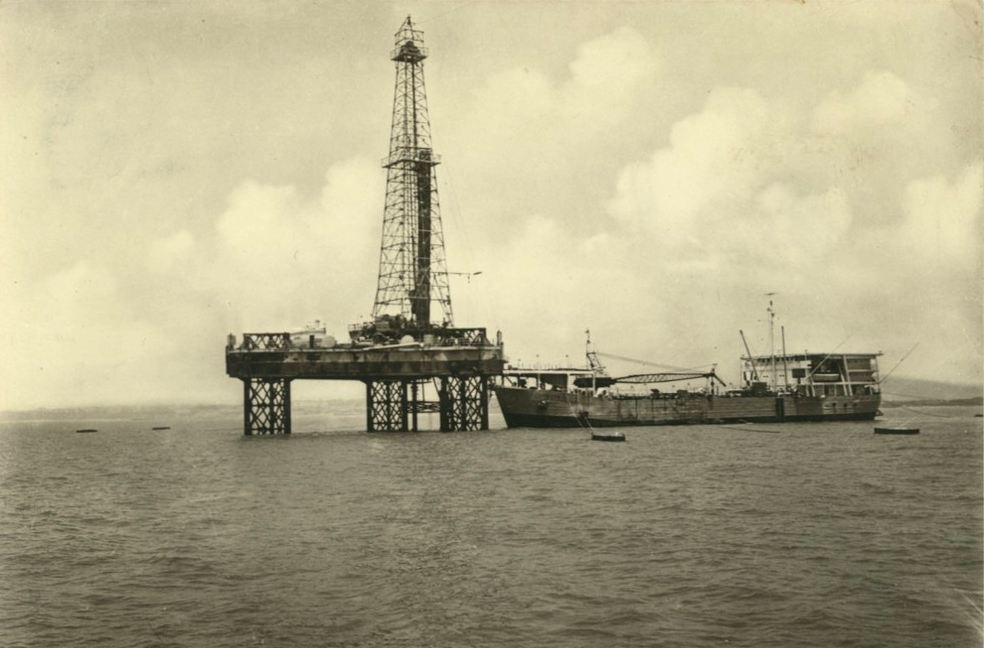
Oil drilling platform off the coast of Sicily, 1962.

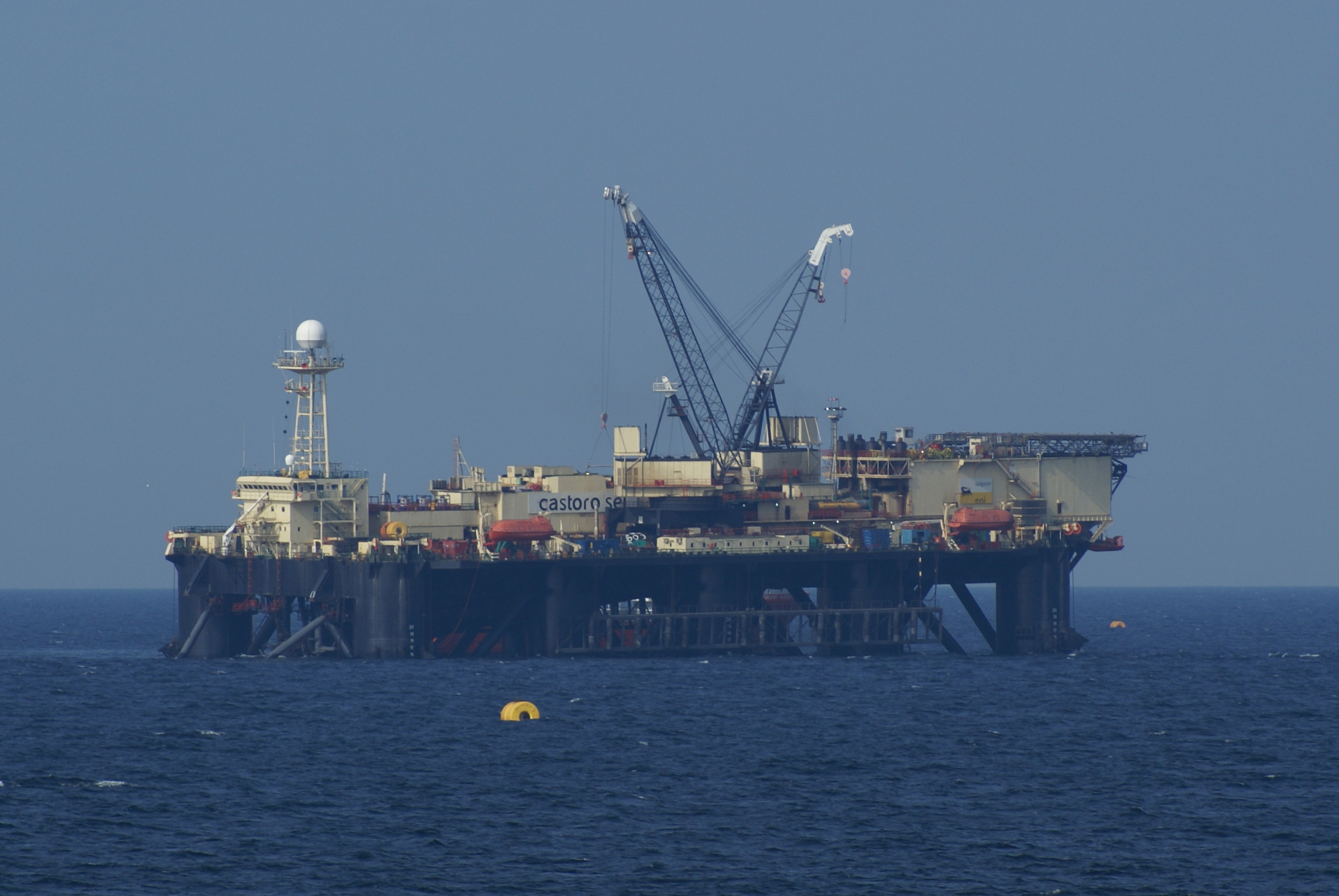
The semi-submersible pipe-laying vessel Castoro Sei operating for Nord Stream in the Baltic Sea south-east of Gotland, Sweden in late March 2011.

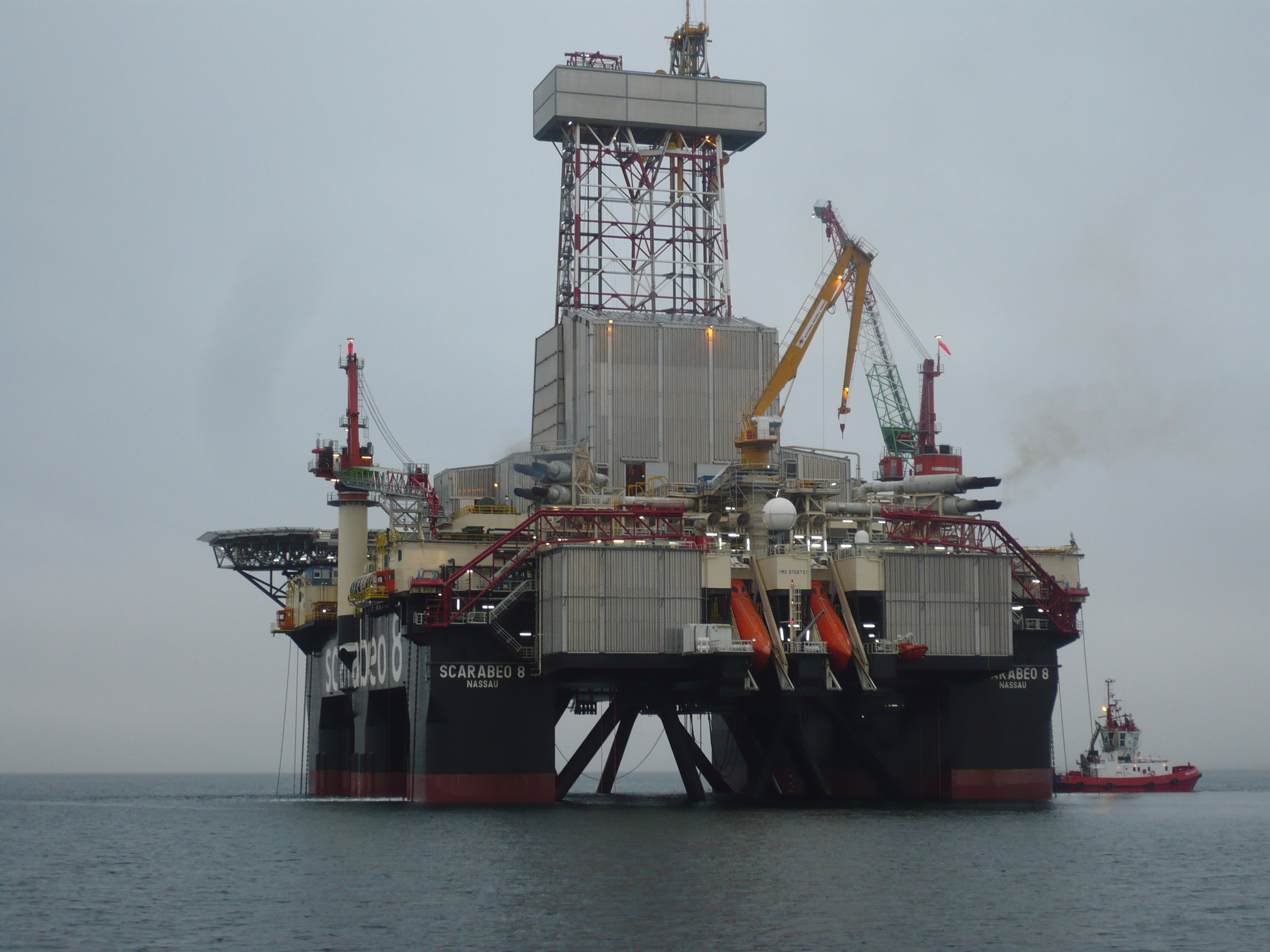
Scarabeo 8 in Norway, 2012.

The history of Saipem is deeply connected to Enrico Mattei's management era of Eni during the years of the Italian economic miracle. In the early 1950s Mattei had reorganized the Italian oil industry through a complex system of outright acquisitions and government investments, in order to guarantee Italy's self-reliance in energy.

At first, Mattei focused on natural gas, the only abundant source of energy available in mainland Italy, through Snam, a newly formed gas pipelines company. In the late 1950s, Eni's subsidiary Snam came to head two sub-holdings: Snam Montaggi, created in 1955 to build pipelines and drilling platforms, and Snam Progetti, created in 1956, specializing in tankers. In 1957 drilling company Saip, a subsidiary of Agip (Eni's fuel retailer), was merged with Snam Montaggi to create Saipem.

Saipem was a pioneer in offshore drilling and pipelines construction in Europe; in 1959 it started drilling oil off the coast of Gela, in Sicily and in the early 1960s initiated the Central European Line pipeline, running from the port of Genoa to West Germany, where Eni Deutschland subsidiary was building refineries in Ingolstadt. In addition, in 1961 Saipem built a 1,140 km long oil pipeline in India and a gas pipeline in Iraq.

=== 1970s-1990s ===
In 1978, Saipem laid down Castoro Sei, a column stabilized semi-submersible pipelay vessel. In the same year Sapiem was commissioned the construction of IGAT-2 pipeline in Iran. About 80 per cent of the line had been completed by 1985, when the works had to be halted because of the Iran-Iraq war.

In 1983, Saipem completed the construction of the massive Trans-Mediterranean Pipeline, linking Algeria to Italy.

In 1988, a joint venture between Saipem and Brown & Root was formed, known as European Marine Contractors, that realized two major projects: Zeepipe, completed in 1993, a 1,416 km natural gas transportation system to transport North Sea natural gas to the receiving terminal at Zeebrugge in Belgium; and a 707 km trunkline connecting Hong Kong with Yancheng 13-1 gasfield, located in the Yinggehai Basin, completed in 1994.

In 1991, Saipem started operating Saipem 7000, the world's second biggest crane vessel.

In 1996, the Maghreb–Europe Gas Pipeline linked Algerian gasfields to Spain.

In 1995-1999, Saipem was the main contractor for the construction of Europipe I and Europipe II natural gas pipelines, connecting Norway to Germany.

=== 21st century ===
In the 21st century, Saipem carried on a number of acquisitions, culminating in the purchase of Bouygues Offshore for $1 billion in 2002. In 2006 Saipem merged with Snamprogetti, a subsidiary of Eni specializing in the design and execution of large scale offshore projects for the production and transportation of hydrocarbons. Through the merger, the new group strengthened its position in West Africa, Middle East, Central Asia, and South East Asia and acquired significant technological competence in gas monetization and heavy oil exploitation.

In 2001-2003, Saipem built the offshore section of Blue Stream, a major trans-Black Sea gas pipeline that carries natural gas from Russia into Turkey.

In 2003-2004, Saipem built the Greenstream pipeline, connecting Libya to Sicily.

In 2006, Saipem completed the sealines of the Dolphin Gas Project, connecting Qatar's North Field to the United Arab Emirates and Oman.

In 2006-2008, Saipem laid down Scarabeo 8 and Scarabeo 9 ultra deepwater 6th generation semi-submersible drilling rigs, completed in 2011–12.

In 2011, Saipem completed the two 1,220 km gas sealines of Nord Stream 1, a system of offshore natural gas pipelines from Russia to Germany and the longest in the world.

In 2013, Saipem was awarded a $3 billion contract for the development of the Egina oil field, located approximately 150 km off the coast of Nigeria in the Gulf of Guinea; the contract included engineering, procurement, fabrication, installation and pre-commissioning of 52 km of oil production and water injection flow lines, 12 flexible jumpers, 20 km of gas export pipelines, 80 km of umbilicals, and of the mooring and offloading systems.

On 8 February 2015, Saipem won a $1.8 billion contract to build two 95 km pipelines at the Kashagan field, linking the oil fields in the Caspian Sea to the mainland in Kazakhstan. In November of the same year Saipem completed the pipelay on the 890 km gas export offshore pipeline for the Inpex-led Ichthys LNG project in Australia, what is said was the longest subsea pipeline in the southern hemisphere and the third longest in the world.

In 2016, Eni sold a 12.5% stake in Saipem (retaining a 30% share though), that was acquired by CDP Equity, and subsequently allowed Saipem to scrap the old Eni logo and design its own, with the objective of creating a new, more autonomous company focusing on oilfield services.

In 2019, Saipem entered the airborne wind energy or energy kite systems industry via an agreement with KiteGen.

In May 2024, Saipem secured three new contracts worth $3.7 billion from TotalEnergies EP Angola Block 20 for the Kaminho deepwater project to develop Cameia and Golfinho oil fields.

== Controversies ==
In 2010, Saipem agreed to pay a penalty of US$30 million to settle a Nigerian investigation into a bribery case involving the construction of Nigeria LNG facilities. Saipem is also under trial in Italy over charges relating to the same case.

In September 2018, an Italian court found Saipem and former CEO Pietro Tali, guilty of corruption over bribes in Algeria. The former CEO was sentenced to four years and nine months in prison and 197.9 million euros were seized from the company.

In January 2020, after an appeal brought before the Milan Court of Appeal, the court finally acquitted Saipem and all managers involved.

== Corporate affairs ==
=== Headquarters and offices ===
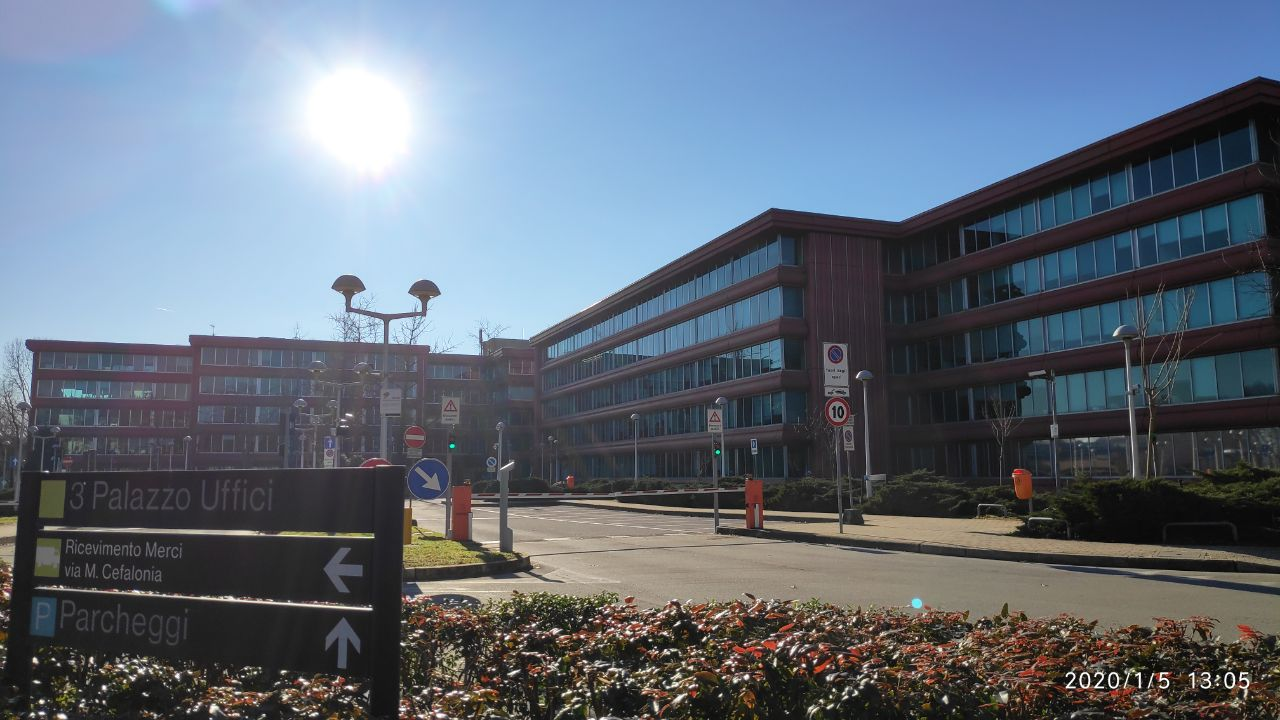
Saipem headquarters in San Donato Milanese.

Saipem's headquarters are located in San Donato Milanese, a suburb of Milan, Italy.

Saipem has offices in over 60 countries, including:

- Far East and Oceania: Australia, China, India, Indonesia, Malaysia, Singapore, Thailand.
- Europe: Italy, France, Belgium, Croatia, Germany, Great Britain, Ireland, Luxemburg, Norway, The Netherlands, Portugal, Spain, Switzerland, Turkey, Poland, Romania
- America: Argentina, Brazil, Canada, Ecuador, Mexico, Peru, U.S.A., Venezuela, Suriname
- CIS: Azerbaijan, Kazakhstan, Russia, Georgia
- Africa: Algeria, Angola, Cameroon, Congo, Egypt, Gabon, Libya, Morocco, Nigeria, Sudan, Mozambique
- Middle East: United Arab Emirates, Saudi Arabia, Iran, Oman, Qatar, Iraq, Kuwait

=== Subsidiaries ===
The group headed by Saipem S.p.A. includes approximately 90 companies and consortia, based all around the world.

- "Petromar's" shares are divided 70% (Saipem) 30% (Sonangol) https://www.petromar.co.ao/about/

=== Board of directors ===
The Board of Directors of the Company consists of nine Directors:

• 6 are drawn from the majority list filed jointly by Eni S.p.A. and CDP Equity S.p.A.;

• 3 are drawn from the minority list filed by institutional investors.

The current Board of Directors was appointed for three financial years by the Shareholders’ Meeting on 14 May 2024. Its mandate will expire on the date the Shareholders’ Meeting is called to approve the financial statement as of 31 December 2026.

The Shareholders' Meeting appointed Elisabetta Serafin as Chairman of the Board of Directors.

The Board of Directors, on 14 May 2024, appointed Alessandro Puliti, already General Manager of the Company, as Chief Executive Officer and Director responsible for establishing and maintaining the Company's Internal Control and Risk Management System; the General Counsel Simone Chini was appointed Secretary of the Board of Directors.

The Board of Directors complies with the applicable legislation on gender balance: at least two fifths of Directors (4 out of 9) belong to the least represented gender. Furthermore, in line with the recommendations for large companies established by the Code of Corporate Governance, to which Saipem complies, at least half the Directors (6 out of 9) are independent: Elisabetta Serafin, Roberto Diacetti, Patrizia Michela Giangualano, Mariano Mossa, Francesca Mariotti and Paul Simon Schapira.

The Board of Directors is thus composed of a majority of independent Directors; Board members are all non-executive Directors, except for the CEO and General Manager.

Based on the statements made by the Directors and information available to the Company, the Board of Directors ascertained that all Directors (i) meet the integrity requirements, (ii) have no causes of ineligibility and incompatibility and (iii) comply with the guidelines, last approved by the Board of Directors on 28 February 2024, concerning the maximum number of offices that Saipem Directors may hold.

=== Main Shareholders ===
On the basis of the information available and the communications received pursuant to CONSOB Resolution 11971/1999 (Issuers Regulations), the shareholders holding shares totalling to more than 3% of the share capital of Saipem S.p.A. are:

| SHAREHOLDERS | % OF CAPITAL |
|---|---|
| Eni S.p.A. | 21.19 |
| CDP Industria S.p.A. | 12.82 |
| The Goldman Sachs Group, Inc. | 5.44* |
| Norges Bank | 3.08 |

=== Share Capital ===
Saipem S.p.A. has a share capital of 501,669,790.83 euros, divided into 1,995,557,732 common shares and 1,059 savings shares, all without the indication of the par value.

The shares are indivisible and each share gives the right to one vote. Holders of Saipem shares can exercise the corporate and property rights attributed to them by law, in compliance with the limits set by the law.

== Main Offshore Pipe-laying fleets at 31 December 2017 ==
| Saipem 7000 | Self-propelled, semi-submersible, dynamically positioned crane and pipelay vessel capable of lifting structures of up to 14,000 tonnes and J-laying pipelines at depths of up to 3,000 metres |
|---|---|
| Saipem FDS | Dynamically positioned vessel utilised for the development of deep-water fields at depths of over 2,000 metres. Capable of launching 22" diameter pipes in J-lay configuration with a holding capacity of up to 750 tonnes and a lifting capacity of up to 600 tonnes |
| Saipem FDS 2 | Dynamically positioned vessel utilised for the development of deep-water fields, capable of launching pipes with a maximum diameter of 36" in J-lay mode with a holding capacity of up to 2,000 tonnes and depths up to 3,000 metres. Also capable of operating in S-lay mode with a lifting capacity of up to 1,000 tonnes |
| Castoro Sei | Semi-submersible pipelay vessel capable of laying large diameter pipe at depths of up to 1,000 metres. |
| Castorone | Self-propelled, dynamically positioned pipe-laying vessel operating in S-lay mode with a 120-metre long S-lay stern stinger composed of 3 articulated and adjustable sections for shallow and deep-water operation, a holding capacity of up to 1,000 tonnes, pipelay capability of up to 60 inches, onboard fabrication facilities for triple and double joints and large pipe storage capacity in cargo holds. |
| Normand Maximus | Dynamic positioning ship (acquired through a long-term lease) for laying umbilicals and flexible lines up to a depth of 3,000 meters. It is equipped with a crane that has a lifting capacity of up to 900 tonnes and a 550-tonne vertical lay tower with the possibility of laying rigid flow lines. |
| Saipem 3000 | Mono-hull, self-propelled d.p. derrick crane ship, capable of laying flexible pipes and umbilicals in deep waters (3,000 m) and lifting structures of up to 2,200 tonnes |
| Castoro II | Derrick lay barge capable of laying pipe of up to 60" diameter and lifting structures of up to 1,000 tonnes. |
| Castoro 10 | Trench/pipelay barge capable of burying pipes of up to 60" diameter and of laying pipes in shallow waters. |
| Castoro 12 | Pipelay barge capable of laying pipes of up to 40" diameter in ultra-shallow waters of a minimum depth of 1.4 metres. |
| Castoro 16 | Post-trenching and back-filling barge for pipes of up to 40" diameter in ultra-shallow waters of a minimum depth of 1.4 metres. |
| Ersai 1 | Heavy lifting barge equipped with 2 crawler cranes, capable of carrying out installations whilst grounded on the seabed and is capable of operating in S-lay mode. The lifting capacities of the 2 crawler cranes are 300 and 1,800 tonnes, respectively. |
| Ersai 2 | Work barge equipped with a fixed crane capable of lifting structures of up to 200 tonnes. |
| Ersai 3 | Support barge with storage space, workshop and offices for 50 people. |
| Ersai 4 | Support barge with workshop and offices for 150 people. |
| Bautino 1 | Shallow water post trenching and backfilling barge. |
| Bautino 2 | Cargo barge for the execution of tie-ins and transportation of materials. |
| Ersai 400 | Accommodation barge for up to 400 people, equipped with gas shelter in the event of an evacuation due to H2S leaks. |
| Castoro XI | Heavy-duty cargo barge |
| Castoro 14 | Cargo barge. |
| Castoro 15 | Cargo barge. |
| S42 | Cargo barge. |
| S43 | Cargo barge. |
| S44 | Launch cargo barge |
| S45 | Launch cargo barge |
| S46 | Cargo barge. |
| S47 | Cargo barge. |
| S 600 | Launch cargo barge |

== Main Drilling fleets at 31 May 2024 ==
- Semi-submersible platform Scarabeo 8
- Semi-submersible platform Scarabeo 9
- Drillship Saipem 10000
- Drillship Saipem 12000
- Drillship DVD (Chartered)
- Drillship Santorini
- Jack-up Perro Negro 4
- Jack-up Perro Negro 7
- Jack-up Perro Negro 8
- Jack-up Perro Negro 9 (Chartered)
- Jack-up Perro Negro 10
- Jack-up Perro Negro 11 (Chartered)
- Jack-up Perro Negro 12 (Chartered)
- Jack-up Perro Negro 13 (Chartered)
- Jindal Pioneer (Chartered)

== Main FPSO's at 31 December 2017 ==
- Saipem Cidade de Vitoria
- Saipem Gimboa
- Saipem Kaombo (not owned)

== See also ==
- List of Italian companies
- List of oilfield service companies

== Essential bibliography ==
- (en) Paul H. Frankel, Oil and Power Policy, New York – Washington, Praeger, 1966
- (en) Marcello Boldrini, Mattei, Rome, Colombo, 1969
- (it) Marcello Colitti, Energia e sviluppo in Italia, Bari, De Donato, 1979
- (it) Nico Perrone, Enrico Mattei, Bologna, Il mulino, 2001 ISBN 88-15-07913-0
