= Yantai CIMC Raffles Shipyard =

Chinese shipbuilding company

Coordinates: 37°35′48″N 121°23′39″E

Yantai CIMC Raffles Offshore Ltd 烟台中集来福士海洋工程有限公司
- Type: subsidiary of CIMC Offshore Holdings Ltd
- Industry: Shipping and Logistics
- Founded: 1994
- Founder: Brian Chang
- Headquarters: Yantai, Shandong, People's Republic of China
- Area served: People's Republic of China
- Parent: CIMC
- Website: www.cimc-raffles.com

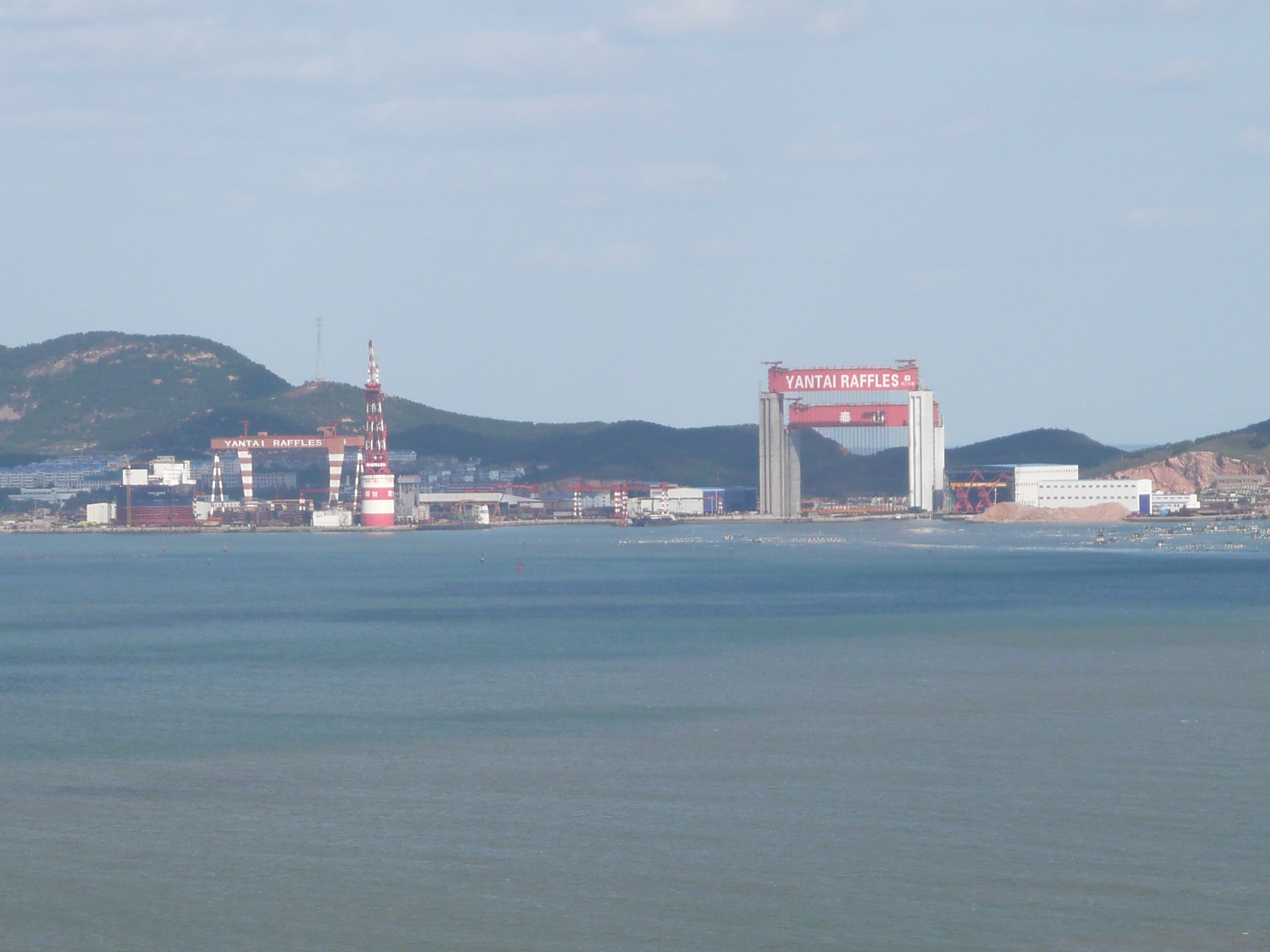
Overview of Yantai Raffles Shipyard in November 2007

Yantai CIMC Raffles Shipyard (Chinese: 烟台中集来福士海洋工程有限公司) is a shipbuilding company in Yantai, Shandong Province, People's Republic of China. The shipyard is one of three operated by CIMC Raffles Offshore Ltd.

Yantai Raffles specializes in offshore and marine fabrication, and shares in the company have been traded on the Oslo OTC system in Norway since May 2006.

Originally established as Yantai Shipyard in 1977, it merged in 1994 with a Singaporean enterprise started by Brian Chang to become Yantai Raffles. The shipyard is in close proximity to Korea and Japan, an area that accounts for 80% of the global shipbuilding capacity. YRS is the only shipyard in China to be majority foreign-owned. It has agreed to acquire 100% of the Sanlian Longkou shipyard in Shandong, China.

Since March 2013, it has been a wholly own subsidiary of CIMC.

== History ==
Chang founded Yantai Raffles Offshore Limited (YRS) in 1994. Previously, he had worked with various companies in Singapore and Malaysia in the marine industry, including Mobil, Jardine Offshore, M.J Batty and Far East Shipyard (now known as Keppel FELS) between 1965 and 1970. In 1971, he started his own company, Promet (now known as PPL), which grew in size over his decade-long tenure. He has worked for 40 years in the shipbuilding and marine fabrication sector, overseeing more than 600 marine construction projects.

Yantai Raffles became known as CIMC Raffles after CIMC invested in the company. By March 2013, CIMC had acquired all outstanding shares of CIMC Raffles. It will now become a subsidiary of CIMC Offshore Holdings Co., Ltd.

== Types of vessels built ==
- Semi-submersible drilling rig
- Jack-up drilling rig
- Platform conversion
- Platform supply vessel
- Anchor handling tug supply vessel
- Heavy lift carrier
- Floating, production, storage and offloading Vessel (FPSO)
- Mono-hull circular column FPSO
- Floating, production and offloading vessel (FPO)
- Pipelay vessel
- Fallpipe vessel
- Semi-submersible bare deck vessel
- Wind turbine installation vessel

== Yard facilities ==
- 72-hectare shipyard
- Building facilities
- World's largest gantry crane with lifting capacity of 20,000 metric tonnes
- One of the world's largest dry docks (L430m x W120m x D14m)
- One of the world's largest land-based pedestal crane
- 2 X 370 metric tonnes gantry cranes
- Fully automated warehouse, with a capacity of 4,000 pallets

== World's largest crane ==
Taisun, the world's largest gantry crane, with a lifting capacity of 20,000 metric tonnes, took over seven years to plan and an additional 12 months for the preparation of its design framework. It was designed by Dalian Huarui Heavy Industry Group Co., Ltd (DHHI).

The crane allows the mating of an entire outfitted deck box of a semi-submersible rig onto its hull/pontoons in one single operation. This method reduces hazards associated with assembling such a rig in open water, and increases efficiency while significantly reducing the man-hours required for such an operation.

The Taisun currently holds the world record for the heaviest weight lifted by a crane, though the Honghai Crane, a larger crane with a weight rating of 22,000 tonnes, was completed in 2014.
