= Yinggehai basin =

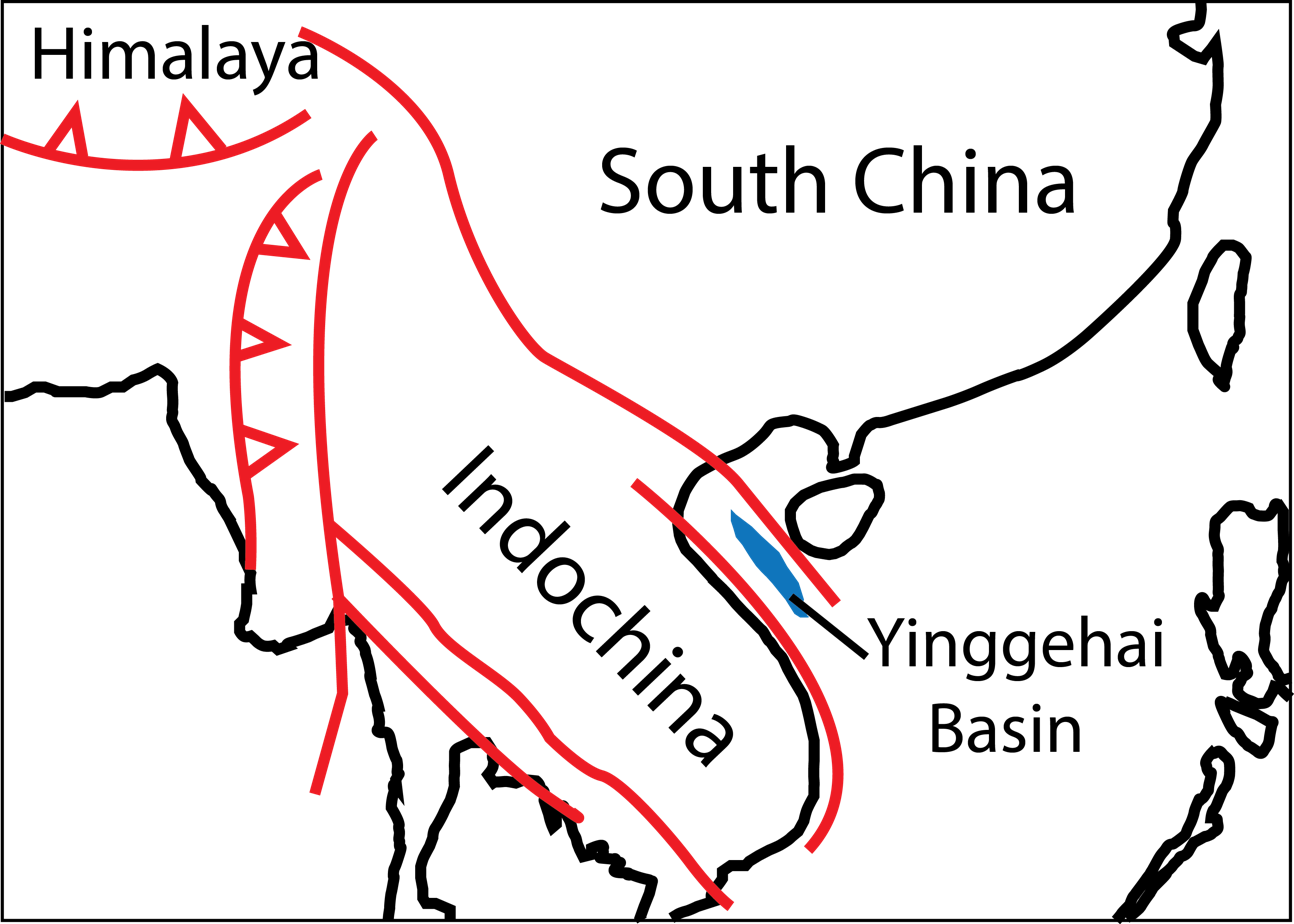
Location of the Yinggehai-Song Hong Basin, marked by blue color.

The Yinggehai-Song Hong Basin is located on the northwest of the South China Sea, between Hainan Island and the coast of northern Vietnam. It is a large extensional pull-part basin in extensional continental marginal setting, developed along the Red River fault zone, which located at the suture of the Indochina Plate and Yangtze Plate (South China Plate).

== Geologic settings ==
=== Tectonic origin ===
Yinggehai basin is lies at the southern end of the Red River fault zone, located at the Gulf of Tonkin. The tectonic origin of Yinggehai basin is controversial. However, it is generally agreed that the basin is opened by the southeastward slip and clockwise rotation of the Indochina block along the Red River fault zone, and that the basin is formed by deformation related to the strike-slip tectonism. The evidence includes the northwest–southeast elongation of the basin, its location at the southern end of the Red River fault zone, and that the basin is bounded by steep faults developed parallel to the Red River fault. What is not agreed is how much motion that has been along the Red River fault during the opening of the basin.

=== Tectonic evolution ===
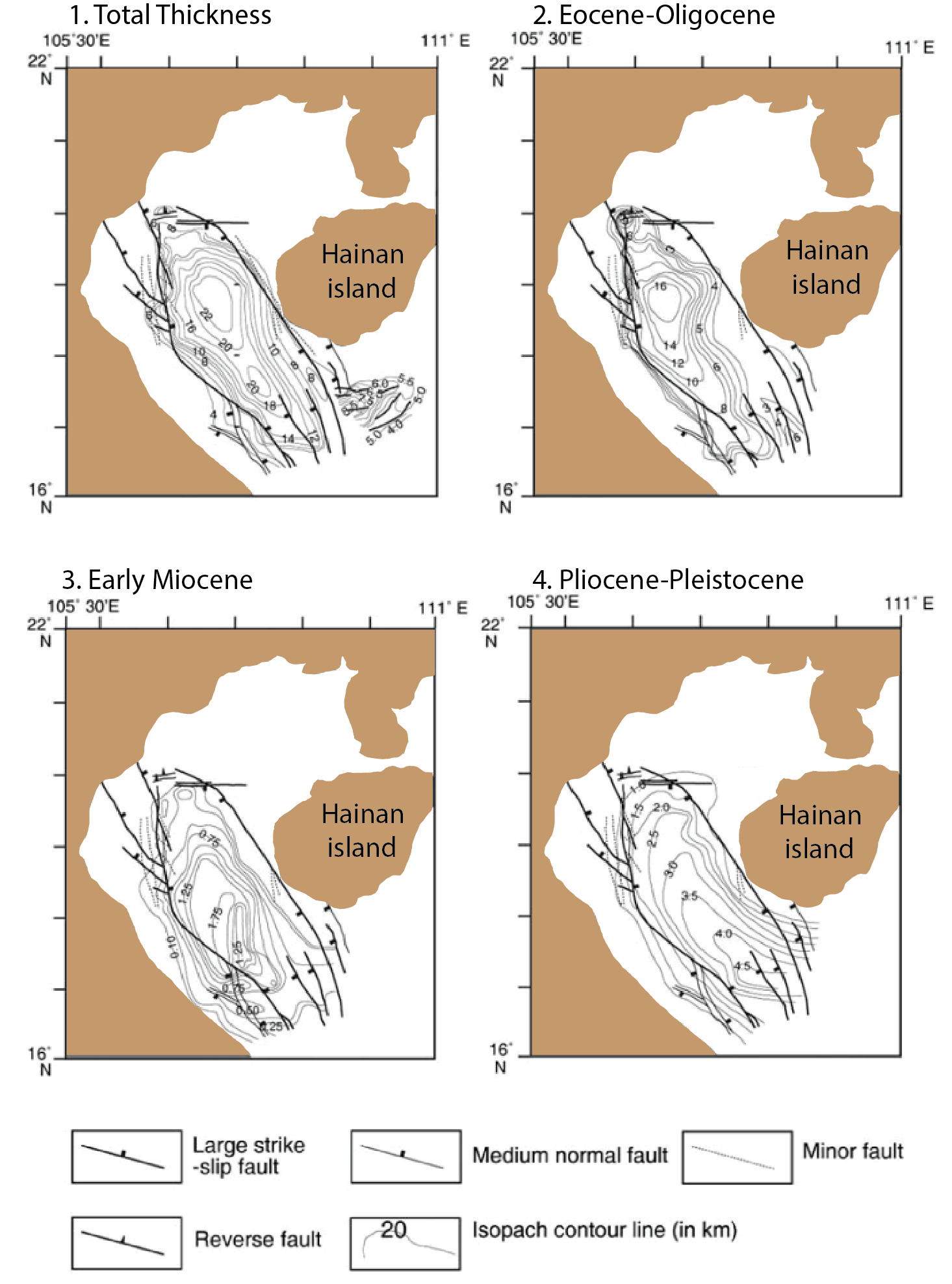
Figure 2. Detailed isopach map for Yinggehai basin. Modified after Hoang et al., 2010

Figure 3. Stratigraphy column and source-reservoir-cap of the Yinggehai Basin. Modified after Wan et al., 2012 and Lei et al., 2011.

==== Slow pull-part stage ====
The slowly extrusion of the Indochina block without clockwise rotation resulted in the sedimentation in Yinggehai basin before 36 Ma.

==== Pull-part stage ====
The sinistral slip of the Indochina block caused pull-apart extension of the Yinggehai Basin, as well as the rapid clockwise rotation during 36 - 21 Ma.

==== Pull-part to thermal subsidence stage ====
The continuing sinistral slip of the Indochina block resulted in thermal subsidence of Yinggehai Basin during 21-16 Ma after the end of active strike slip faulting. Within this period, the sinistral strike-slip continued but the clockwise rotation of Indochina block slowed down.

==== Dextral strike-slip stage ====
There is a tectonic inversion at 5 Ma, which initiated the dextral movement of the South China block. However, some researchers don't think that the dextral movement of the South China block reached Yinggehai basin while they argue that the dextral subsidence in the Yinggehai basin since around 5 Ma was resulted from the southeastward roverent of Hainan island.

== Sedimentation ==
The sediments filled in the Yinggehai Basin came mostly from Tibet plateau and was transported mostly by the Red River, and the depocenter has migrated southward since the Oligocene. The peaks in sediment was during the Miocene and the Plio-Pleistocene (Figure 4).

The extension led to a maximum beta of about 3.6 in the central Yinggehai Basin, where 17 km of the sediments have accumulated. See figure 3 for the stratigraphy of the basin.

=== Lithology ===
Eocene (Lingtou Group)

Mostly shale with sandy shale.

Oligocene

Early Oligocene (Yacheng Group): shale, sandstone, and conglomeratic sandstone with coal-bearing strata from lacustrine, fluvial, and alluvial depositional environment. The thickness is around 0–910 m.

Late Oligocen (Lingshui Group): sandstone, sandy shale, and shaly sandstone from fan deltaic environment at early stage and littoral to neritic environment at late stage. The thickness is around 0–1680 m.

Miocene

Early Miocene (Sanya formation): shale, sandstone, and shaly sandstone from littoral to neritic environment. The thickness is around 0–795 m.

Middle Miocene (Meishan formation): shale, shaly sandstone, and sandstone from littoral to neritic deltaic environment. The thickness is around 0–1324 m.

Late Miocene (Huangliu formation): shale, shaly sandstone, and sandstone from littoral to bathyal basin floor fan environment. The thickness is around 0–664.

Pliocene (Yinggehai formation)

Shale, sandy shale, and shaly sandstone from littoral to bathyal environment. The thickness is around 463–2435 m.

Holocene, Pleistocene (Ledong formation)

Shale from littoral environment. The thickness is around 377-2512m.

Figure 4. Reconstructed sediment budgets for the southern Yinggehai basin. modified after Clift et al., 2006

== Shale diapir ==
During the late Pliocene, the sedimentation was most rapid. The shale diapirs ( see figure 5) grew into the section, which is generally thought to be caused by the rapid deposition and resultant increase in over pressuring.

Figure 5. A Northwest-Southwest cross section shown the shale diaper in Yinggehai basin. Modified from Clift et al., 2006

The generation of overpressure, which drives diapirism, are complicated and controlled by many factors and there are many debates. Some researchers think that the major factors are (1) high sedimentation rate (especially during Plio-Pleistocene); (2) high palaeogeothermal gradient; and (3) strike-slip tectonism along the offshore extension of the Red River Fault.

== Source-reservoir-cap ==
=== Hydrocarbon source rock ===
Three sets of major hydrocarbon source rocks developed in Yinggehai basin.

Paleogene mudstone
Eocene lacustrine hydrocarbon layer and oligocene neritic hydrocarbon layer.

Neogen Loer-Middle Miocene littoral to neritic mudstone.

Neogen Upper Miocene-Pliocene littoral to bathyal shale.

Within these sets, Neogen Lower-Middle Miocene littoral to neurotic mudstone is the mose important hydrocarbon source rocks, mostly distributed in the central diapir zone up to a maximum start thickness of 5,000 m with great than 70% shale content.

=== Reservoirs ===
Three major sedimentary systems consist of various reservoir sand bodies. The sandstone in the central diaper zone are fine-grained with high mature and high clay content.

=== Traps ===
There are also multiple types of traps in Yinggehai basin including: (1) delta to turbidite sandstone traps; (2) coastal sand traps; (3)basin floor fan and slope fan traps; and (4) basin floor channel sandstone of traps.

== Natural gas generation ==
=== Diagenetic stage ===
During the early diagenetic stage, the basin mostly produced micro methane. During the later diagenetic stage the basin mostly produced organic CO_{2}, resulted from the decarboxylation of organic material. However, most organic CO_{2} has not accumulated due to its high solubility in water and huge amount of formation water in that stage.

=== Catagenetic stage ===
During the early catagenetic stage, the basin mostly produced thermal genetic hydrocarbon gases, nitrogen and secondarily produced liquid hydrocarbons. During the later catagenetic stage, the main products were methane and nitrogen, as well as inorganic CO_{2} resulted from the inorganic carbonate decomposition.

=== Metamorphic stage ===
During this stage, the main products were methane form high-temperature cracking of kerogen and/or liquid hydrocarbon and CO_{2} from the inorganic carbonate decomposition.

== See also ==
- South China Sea
- Strike-slip tectonics
- Red River fault
