= 1937 =

1937 in various calendars
- Gregorian calendar: 1937; MCMXXXVII
- Ab urbe condita: 2690
- Armenian calendar: 1386; ԹՎ ՌՅՁԶ
- Assyrian calendar: 6687
- Baháʼí calendar: 93–94
- Balinese saka calendar: 1858–1859
- Bengali calendar: 1343–1344
- Berber calendar: 2887
- British Regnal year: 1 Geo. 6 – 2 Geo. 6
- Buddhist calendar: 2481
- Burmese calendar: 1299
- Byzantine calendar: 7445–7446
- Chinese calendar: 丙子年 (Fire Rat); 4634 or 4427 — to — 丁丑年 (Fire Ox); 4635 or 4428
- Coptic calendar: 1653–1654
- Discordian calendar: 3103
- Ethiopian calendar: 1929–1930
- Hebrew calendar: 5697–5698
- Hindu calendars
- Vikram Samvat: 1993–1994
- Shaka Samvat: 1858–1859
- Kali Yuga: 5037–5038
- Holocene calendar: 11937
- Igbo calendar: 937–938
- Iranian calendar: 1315–1316
- Islamic calendar: 1355–1356
- Japanese calendar: Shōwa 12 (昭和１２年)
- Javanese calendar: 1867–1868
- Juche calendar: 26
- Julian calendar: Gregorian minus 13 days
- Korean calendar: 4270
- Minguo calendar: ROC 26 民國26年
- Nanakshahi calendar: 469
- Thai solar calendar: 2479–2480
- Tibetan calendar: མེ་ཕོ་བྱི་བ་ལོ་ (male Fire-Rat); 2063 or 1682 or 910 — to — མེ་མོ་གླང་ལོ་ (female Fire-Ox); 2064 or 1683 or 911

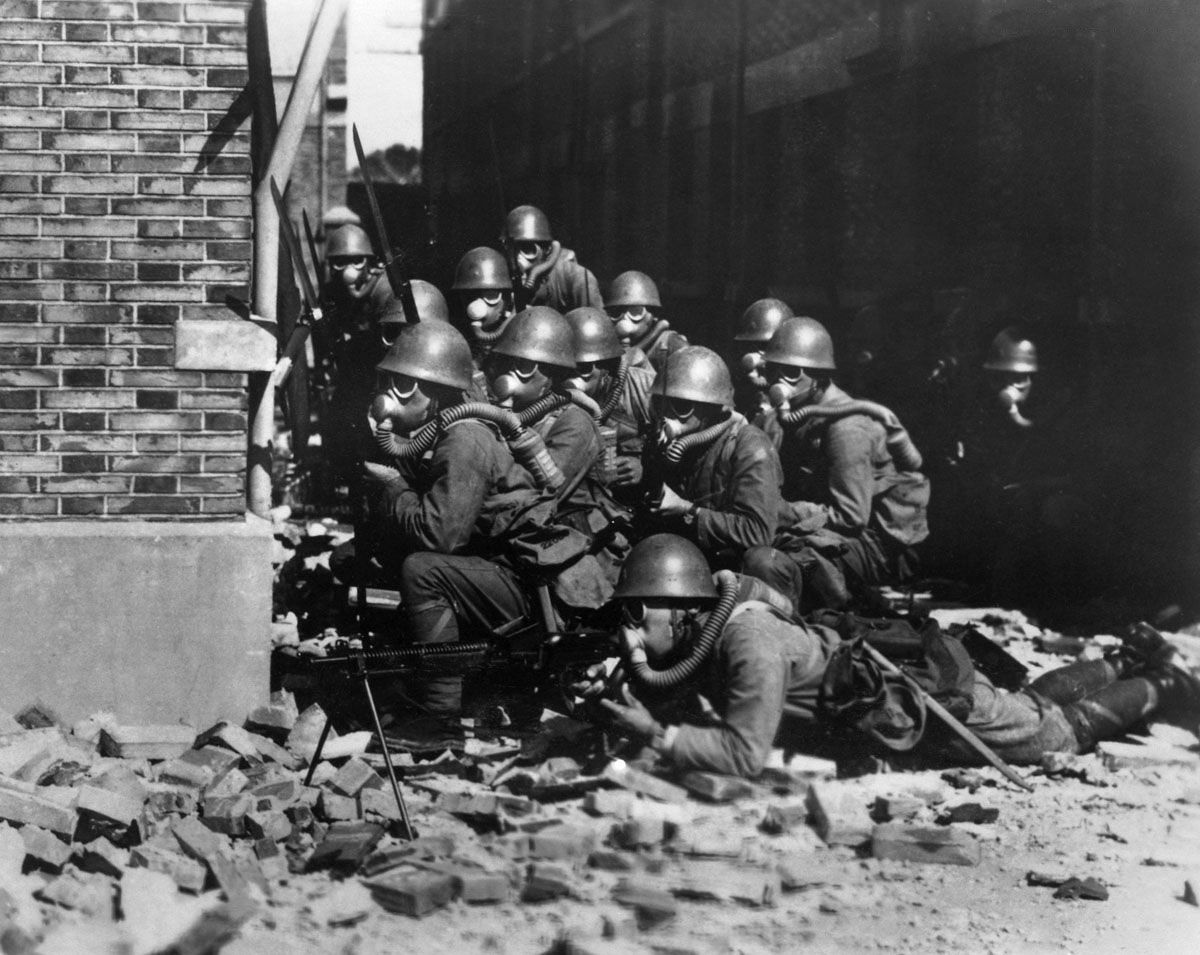
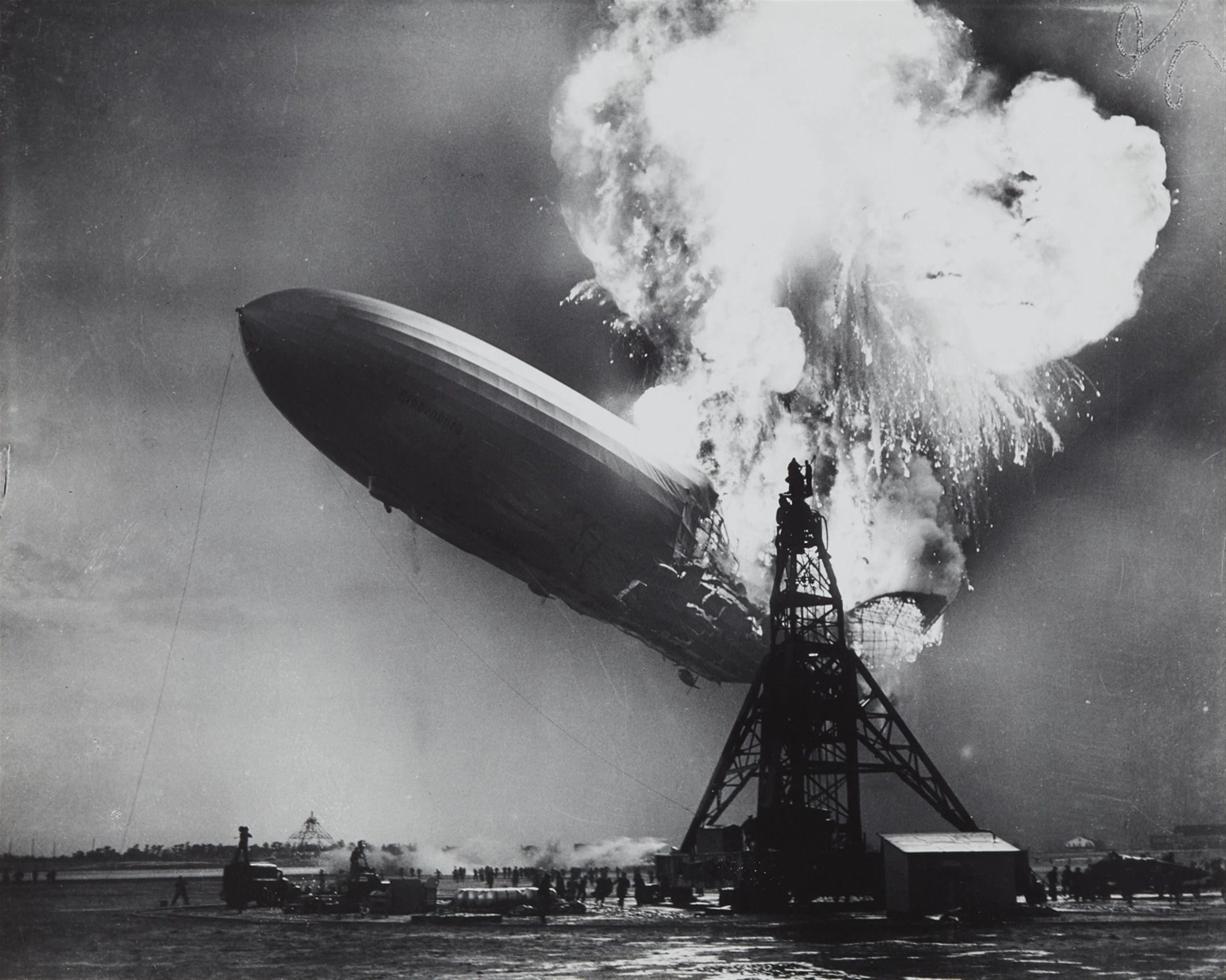
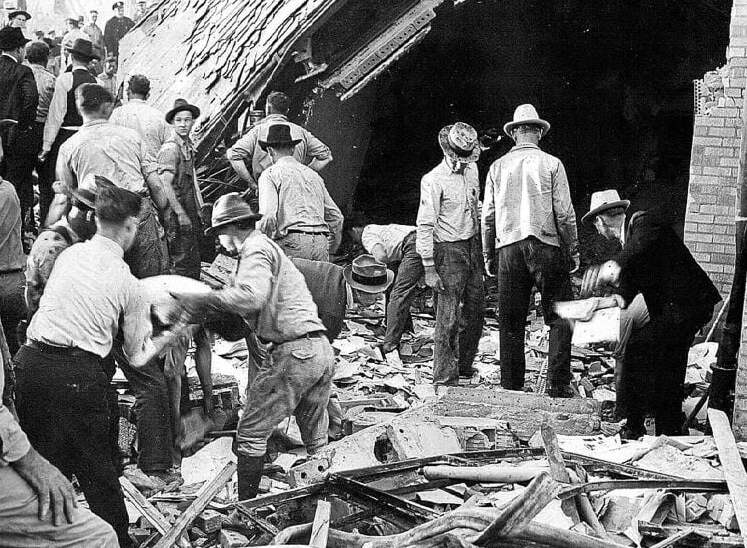
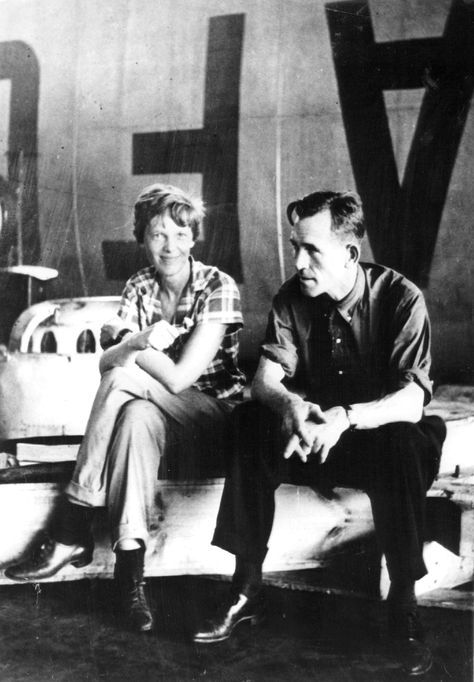
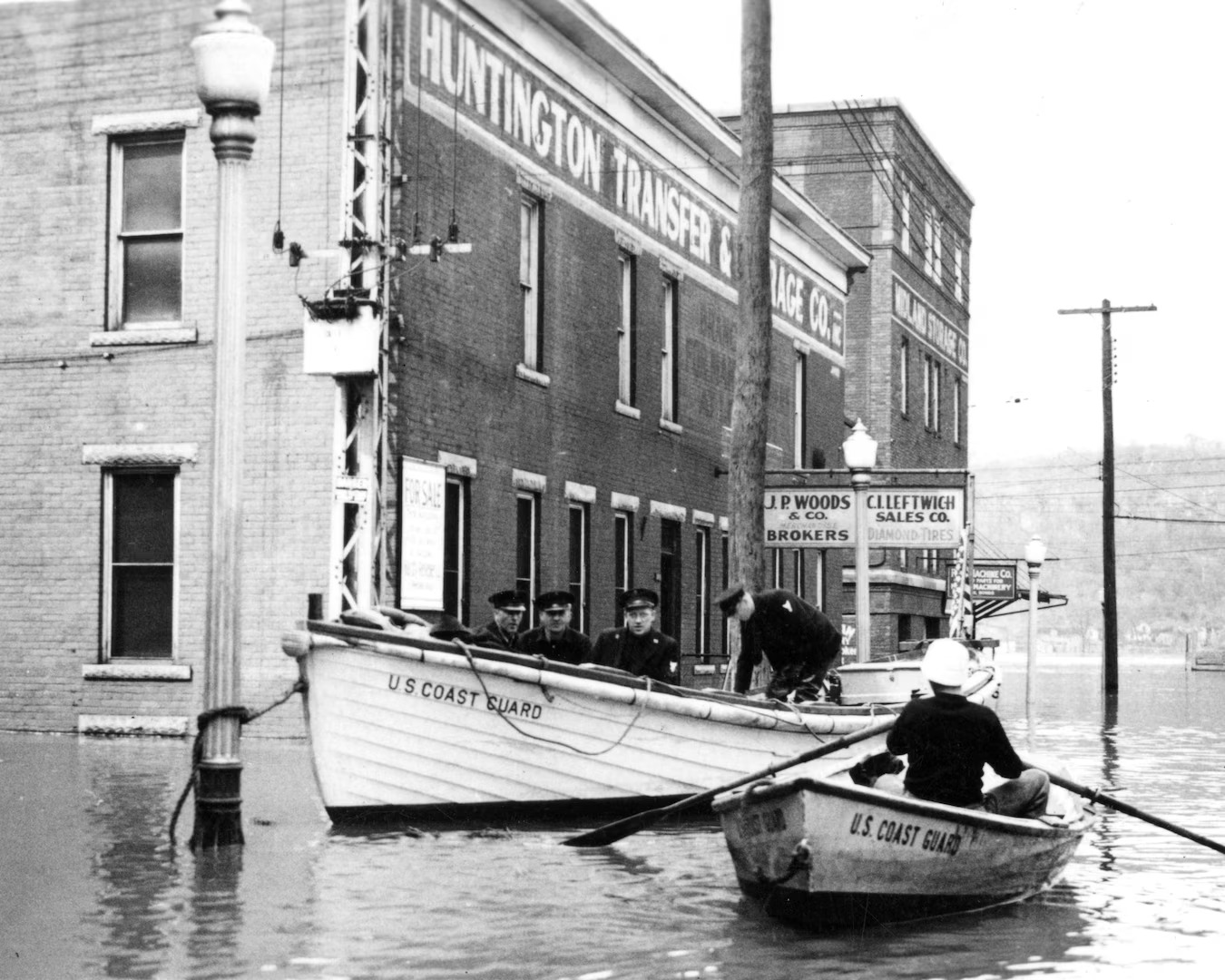
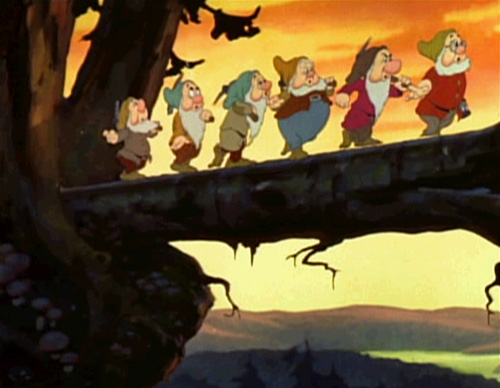
From top to bottom, left to right:
- The Second Sino-Japanese War erupts after the Marco Polo Bridge Incident, as Japan invades China and commits atrocities including the Nanjing Massacre;
- The Hindenburg disaster shocks the world when the German airship bursts into flames in New Jersey, killing 36 and ending the airship era;
- The New London School explosion in Texas kills nearly 300, prompting gas safety reforms;
- Aviator Amelia Earhart and navigator Fred Noonan vanish over the Pacific while attempting a global flight;
- The Ohio River flood of 1937 displaces over a million across multiple states;
- Walt Disney’s Snow White and the Seven Dwarfs premieres as the first full-length cel-animated feature film.

1937 (MCMXXXVII) was a common year starting on Friday of the Gregorian calendar, the 1937th year of the Common Era (CE) and Anno Domini (AD) designations, the 937th year of the 2nd millennium, the 37th year of the 20th century, and the 8th year of the 1930s decade.

== Events ==
=== January ===
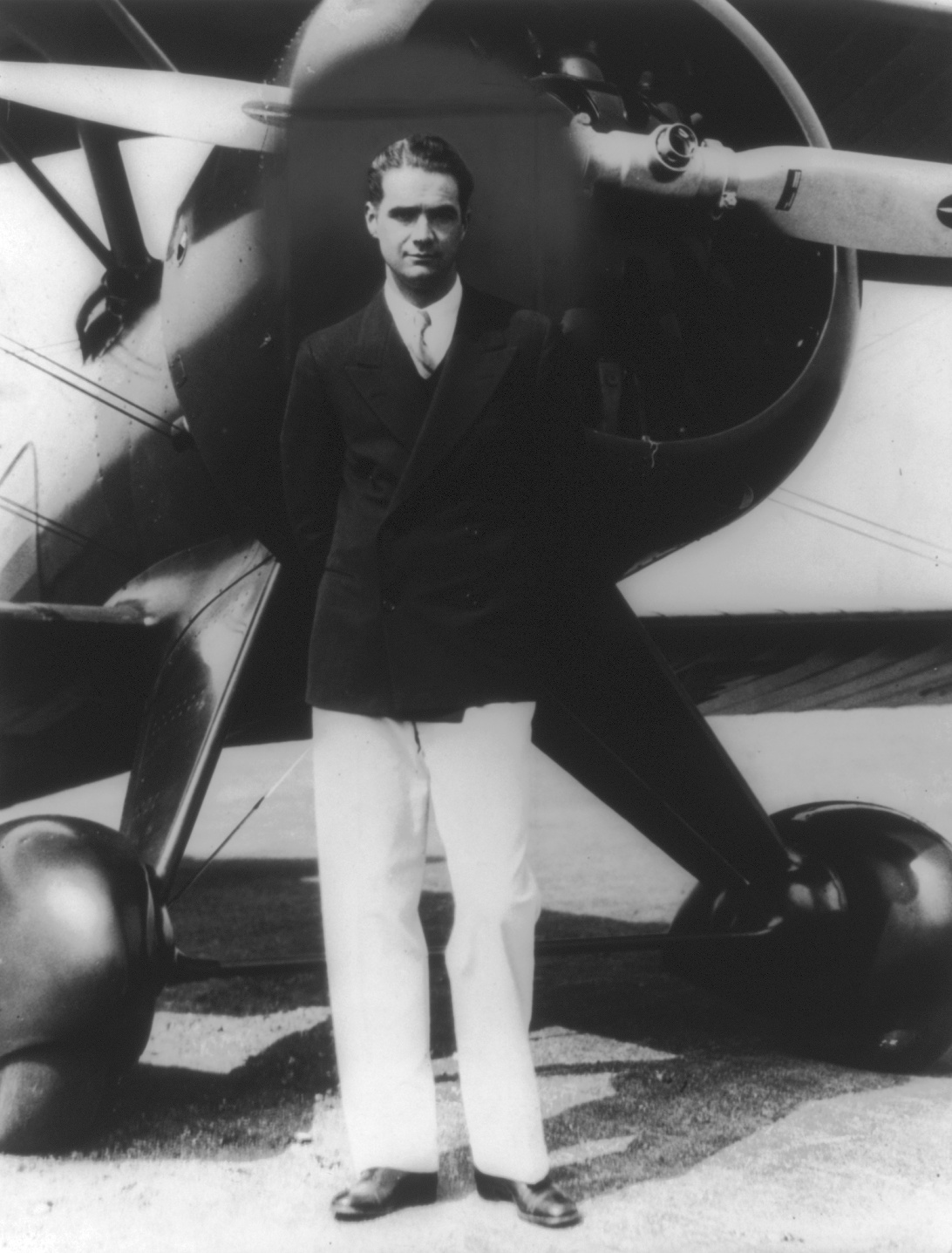
January 19: Howard Hughes sets record.

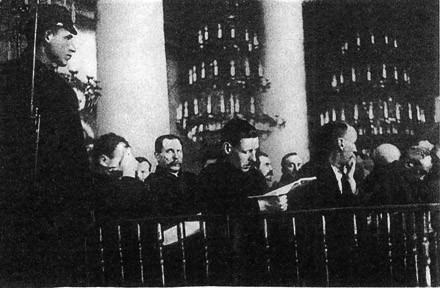
The Second Moscow Trial

- January 1 – Anastasio Somoza García becomes President of Nicaragua.
- January 5 – Water levels begin to rise in the Ohio River in the United States, leading to the Ohio River flood of 1937, which continues into February, leaving 1 million people homeless and 385 people dead.
- January 15 – Spanish Civil War: The Second Battle of the Corunna Road ends inconclusively.
- January 23 – Moscow Trials: Trial of the Anti-Soviet Trotskyist Center – In the Soviet Union 17 leading Communists go on trial, accused of participating in a plot led by Leon Trotsky to overthrow Joseph Stalin's regime, and assassinate its leaders.
- January 30 – The Moscow Trial initiated on January 23 is concluded. Thirteen of the defendants are sentenced to death (including Georgy Pyatakov, Nikolay Muralov and Leonid Serebryakov), while the rest, including Karl Radek and Grigory Sokolnikov are sent to labor camps and later murdered. They were initially spared for implicating others, including Rykov, Bukharin and Tukhachevsky, setting the stage for further trials

=== February ===
- February 8 – Spanish Civil War: Falangist troops take Málaga.
- February 8–27 – Spanish Civil War – Battle of Jarama: Nationalist and Republican troops fight to a stalemate.
- February 16 – Wallace H. Carothers receives a patent for nylon in the United States.
- February 19
  - Airliner VH-UHH (Stinson) goes down over Lamington National Park, bound for Sydney, killing 5 people.
  - Yekatit 12: During a public ceremony at the Viceregal Palace (the former Imperial residence) in Addis Ababa, Ethiopia, two Eritrean nationalists attempt to kill viceroy Rodolfo Graziani with a number of grenades. Italian security guards fire into the crowd of Ethiopian onlookers. Authorities exact further reprisals, which include indiscriminately slaughtering native Ethiopians over the next 3 days, detaining thousands of Ethiopians at Danan and slaughtering almost 300 monks at the Debre Libanos Monastery.
  - The red, white and blue colours of the flag of the Netherlands are confirmed by royal decree.
- February 21 – The League of Nations Non-Intervention Committee prohibits foreign nationals from fighting in the Spanish Civil War.
- February 25 – Hergé's Tintin adventure The Broken Ear (L'Oreille cassée) concludes serialization in the Belgian weekly newspaper supplement Le Petit Vingtième, and soon afterwards is published as a book in black and white.

=== March ===
- March 10 (dated March 14 (Passion Sunday)) – The encyclical Mit brennender Sorge ("With burning concern") of Pope Pius XI is published in Germany in the German language. Largely the work of Cardinals von Faulhaber and Pacelli, it condemns breaches of the 1933 Reichskonkordat agreement signed between the Nazi government and the Catholic Church, and criticises Nazism's views on race and other matters incompatible with Catholicism.
- March 18 – New London School explosion: In the worst school disaster in American history in terms of lives lost, the New London School in New London, Texas, suffers a catastrophic natural gas explosion, killing in excess of 295 students and teachers. Mother Frances Hospital opens in Tyler, Texas, a day ahead of schedule, in response to the explosion.
- March 19 – The encyclical Divini Redemptoris of Pope Pius XI, critical of communism, is published.
- March 21 – Ponce massacre: A police squad, acting under orders from Governor of Puerto Rico Blanton Winship, opens fire on peaceful demonstrators protesting at the arrest of Puerto Rican Nationalist Party leader Pedro Albizu Campos, killing 17 people and injuring over 200.

=== April ===
- April 1
  - Aden becomes a British crown colony.
  - The Bombing of Jaén is carried out in Spain, by the Condor Legion of the Nazi German Luftwaffe.
- April 9 – The Kamikaze arrives at Croydon Airport in London; it is the first Japanese-built aircraft to fly to Europe.
- April 12 – Frank Whittle ground-tests the world's first jet engine designed to power an aircraft, at Rugby, England.
- April 20 – A fire in an elementary school in Kilingi-Nõmme, Estonia, kills 17 students and injures 50.
- April 26 – Spanish Civil War: The Bombing of Guernica is carried out in Spain, by the Condor Legion of the Nazi German Luftwaffe, in support of the Francoists. Three-quarters of the town is destroyed and hundreds killed.

=== May ===
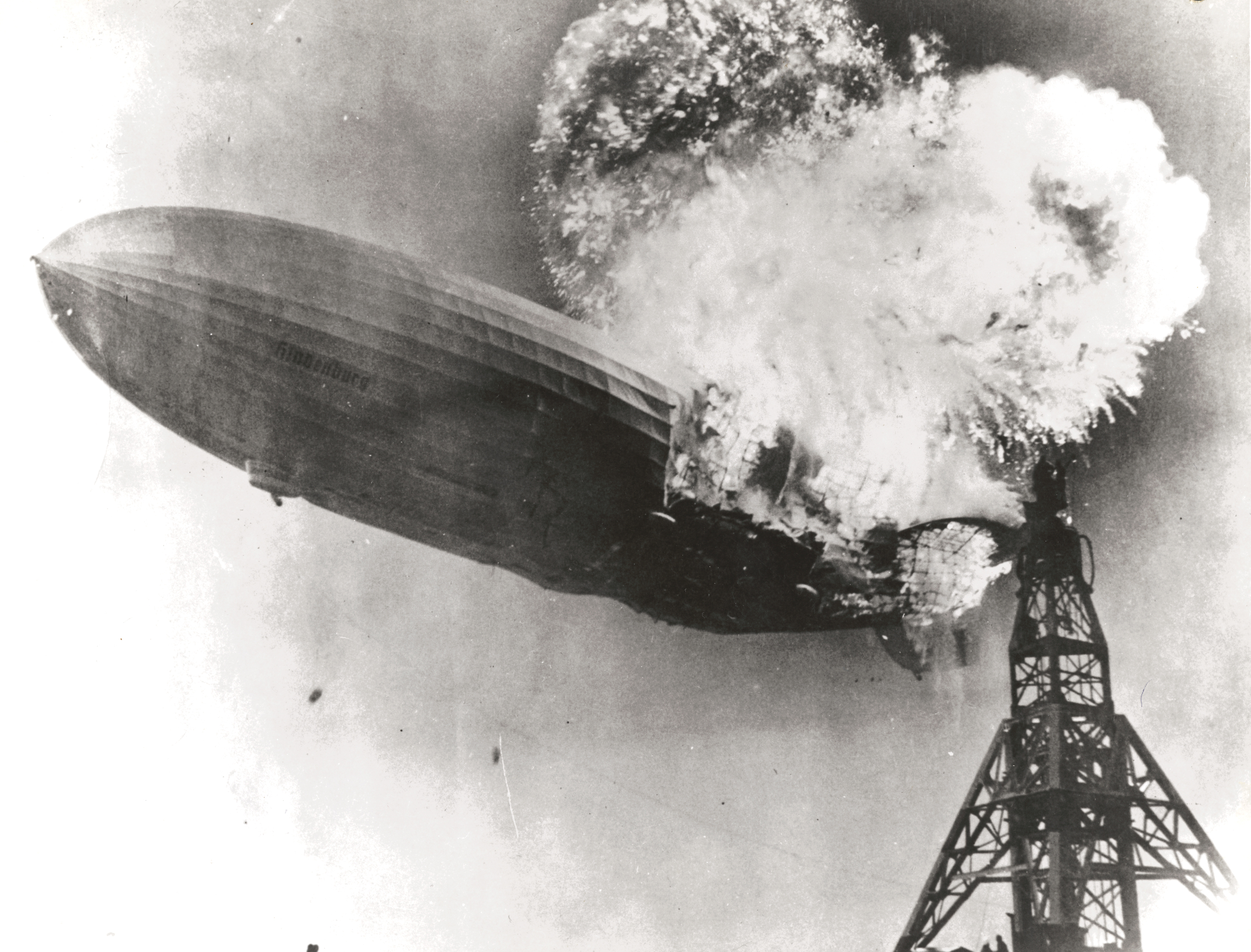
May 6: The Hindenburg disaster occurs.

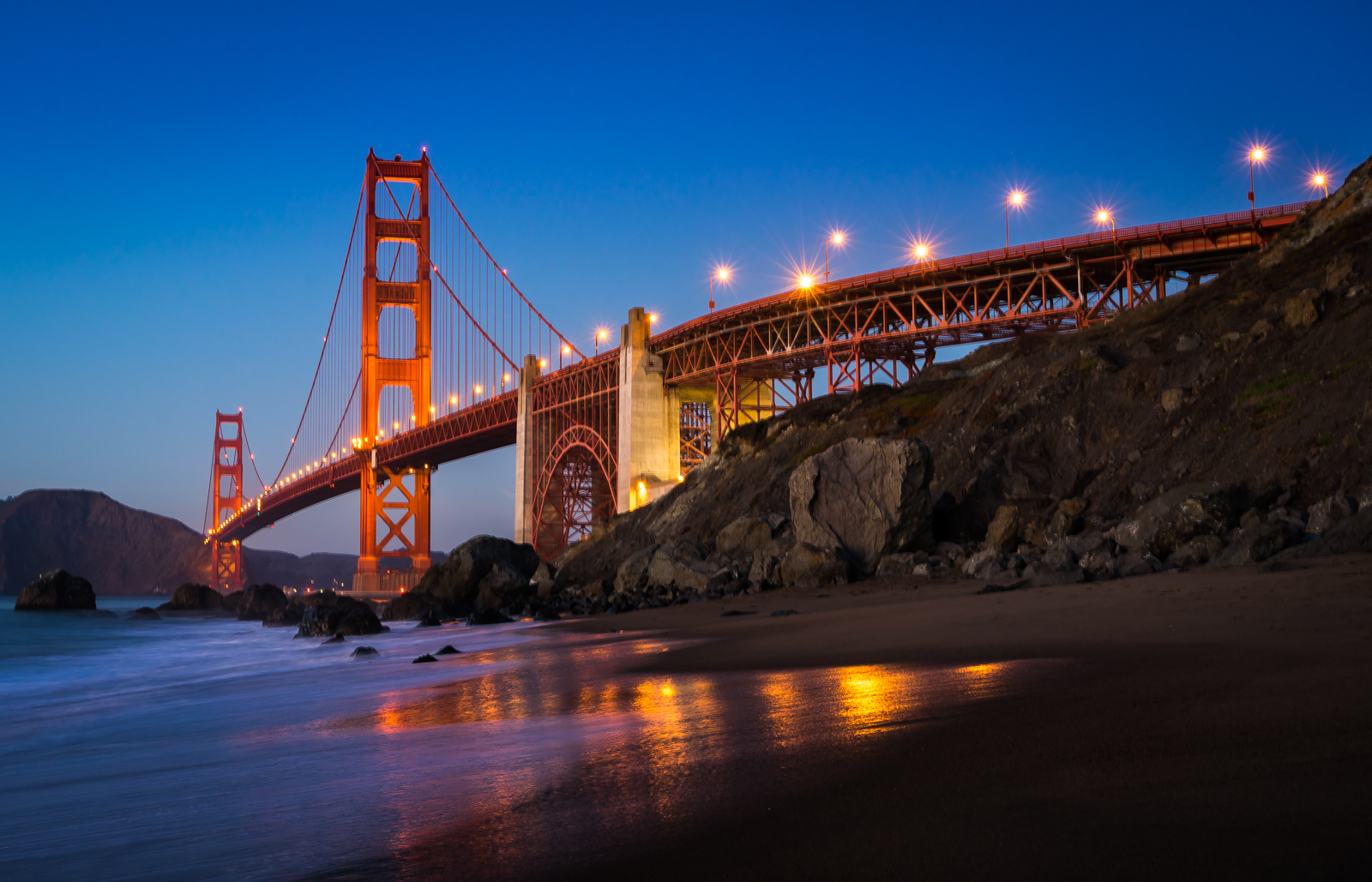
May 27: The Golden Gate Bridge opens.

- May 6 – Hindenburg disaster: In the United States, the German airship Hindenburg bursts into flame when mooring to a mast in Lakehurst, New Jersey. Of the 36 passengers and 61 crew on board, 13 passengers and 22 crew die, as well as one member of the ground crew.
- May 7 – Spanish Civil War: The German Condor Legion Fighter Group, equipped with Heinkel He 51 biplanes, arrives in Spain to assist Francisco Franco's forces.
- May 8 – Wydad Athletic Club (WAC)(Arabic: نادي الوداد الرياضي; Berber: Wydad Dar al-Beida; commonly: Wydad al ouma) is established in Casablanca, Morocco; it will be best known for its Casablanca Association football team.
- May 12 – George VI and Elizabeth are crowned King and Queen of the United Kingdom and the British Dominions, and Emperor and Empress of India at Westminster Abbey, London.
- May 21
  - A Russian manned ice station becomes the first scientific research settlement to operate on the drift ice of the Arctic Ocean.
  - As one of the reprisals for the attempted assassination of Italian viceroy Rodolfo Graziani, a detachment of Italian troops massacres the entire community of Debre Libanos in Ethiopia, killing 297 monks and 23 laymen.
- May 28 – Neville Chamberlain becomes Prime Minister of the United Kingdom, following the retirement of Stanley Baldwin.
- May 30
  - Spanish Civil War: Spanish ship Ciudad de Barcelona is torpedoed.
  - Memorial Day massacre of 1937: The Chicago Police Department shoot and kill 10 unarmed demonstrators in Chicago.

=== June ===
- June – Picasso completes his painting Guernica.
- June–July – The Dáil Éireann debates and passes the new draft Constitution of Ireland, which is then submitted for public approval by plebiscite.
- June 3 – Wallis Simpson marries the Duke of Windsor, the former Edward VIII, in France.
- June 8
  - The Dáil Éireann passes the Executive Authority (Consequential Provisions) Act, 1937, which abolishes the office of Governor-General of the Irish Free State, retrospectively dated to December 1936.
  - The first total solar eclipse to exceed 7 minutes of totality, in over 800 years, is visible in the Pacific and Peru.
- June 21 – The coalition government of Léon Blum resigns in France.

=== July ===
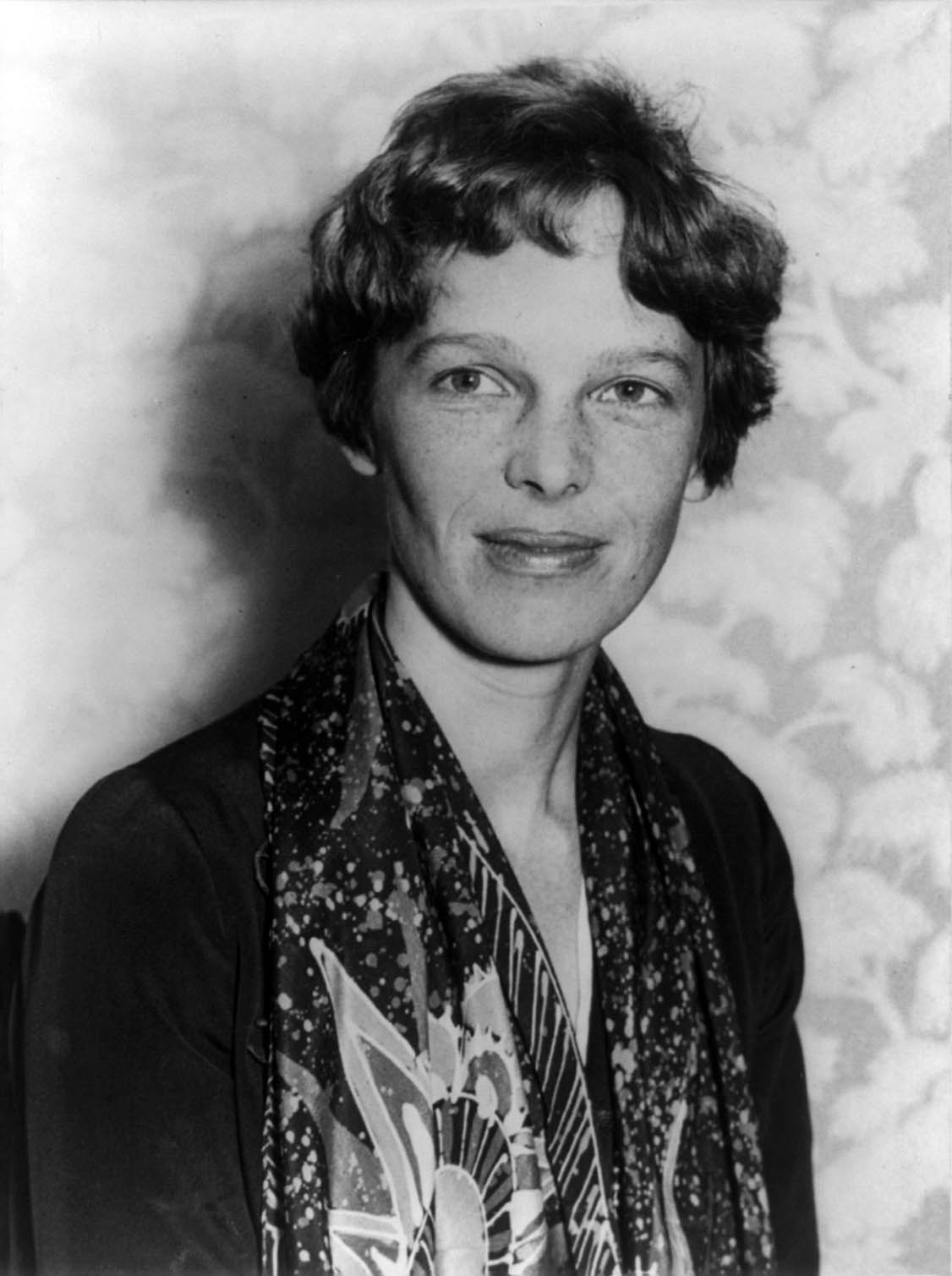
July 2: Amelia Earhart disappears from New Guinea.

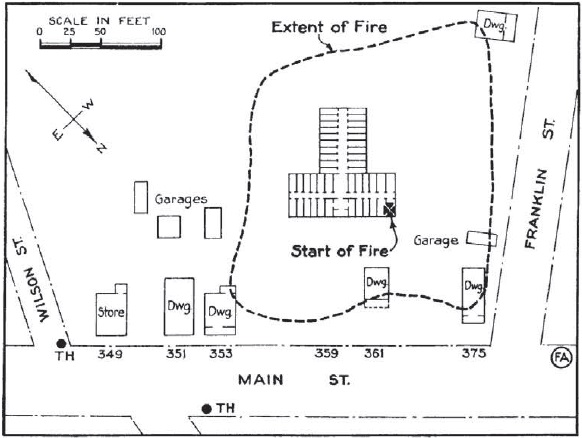
July 9: The silent film archives of Fox Film Corporation are destroyed by the 1937 Fox vault fire.

- July 1
  - The Gestapo arrests pastor Martin Niemöller in Germany.
  - In a referendum the people of the Irish Free State accept the new Constitution by 685,105 votes to 527,945.
- July 2 – Amelia Earhart and navigator Fred Noonan disappear after taking off from New Guinea, during Earhart's attempt to become the first woman to fly around the world.
- July 7
  - In the Marco Polo Bridge Incident, Japanese and Chinese forces exchange fire near Beijing, beginning the Second Sino-Japanese War.
  - The Peel Commission proposes partition of the British Mandate of Palestine into separate Arab and Jewish states.
- July 9 – 1937 Fox vault fire: The silent film archives of Fox Film Corporation are destroyed
- July 20 – The Geibeltbad Pirna water sports facility is opened in Dresden, Germany.
- July 21 – Éamon de Valera is elected President of the Executive Council (prime minister) of the Irish Free State, by the Dáil (parliament).
- July 22 – New Deal: The United States Senate votes down President Franklin D. Roosevelt's proposal to add more justices to the Supreme Court of the United States.
- July 25–31 – Sino-Japanese War: Battle of Beiping–Tianjin, a series of actions fought around Beiping and Tianjin, result in Japanese victory.
- July 29 – Tongzhou Mutiny: Units of the East Hebei Army mutiny and kill Japanese troops and civilians in Tongzhou.
- July 31 – NKVD Order No. 00447 "Об операции по репрессированию бывших кулаков, уголовников и других антисоветских элементов" ("The operation for repression of former kulaks, criminals and other anti-Soviet elements") is approved by the decision of the Politbureau of the CC of the VKP(b) of the Soviet Union, initially as a 4-month plan for 75,950 people to be executed and an additional 193,000 to be sent to the Gulag.

=== August ===
- August 2 – The Marijuana Tax Act in the United States is a significant bill on the path that will lead to the criminalization of cannabis. It was introduced to the U.S. Congress by Commissioner of the Federal Bureau of Narcotics Harry Anslinger.
- August 5 – The Soviet Union commences one of the largest campaigns of the Great Purge, to "eliminate anti-Soviet elements". Within the following year, at least 724,000 people are fired on order of the troikas, directed by Joseph Stalin. This is an offensive that targets social classes (such as the kulaks or nobles) and Stalin's personal opponents from the Communist Party and their sympathizers.
- August 6 – Spanish Civil War: Falangist artillery bombards Madrid.
- August 8 – Japan occupies Beijing.
- August 9 – The Polish Operation of the NKVD (1937–38) is signed by Nikolai Yezhov as a continuation of the Great Purge.
- August 13 – Second Sino-Japanese War: The Battle of Shanghai opens.
- August 24 – Spanish Civil War: The government of the autonomous Basque Country agrees to surrender to the nationalists.
- August 26 – Second Sino-Japanese War: Japanese aircraft attack the car carrying the ambassador of Great Britain during a raid on Shanghai.
- August 28 – Toyota was incorporated and founded on this day.

=== September ===
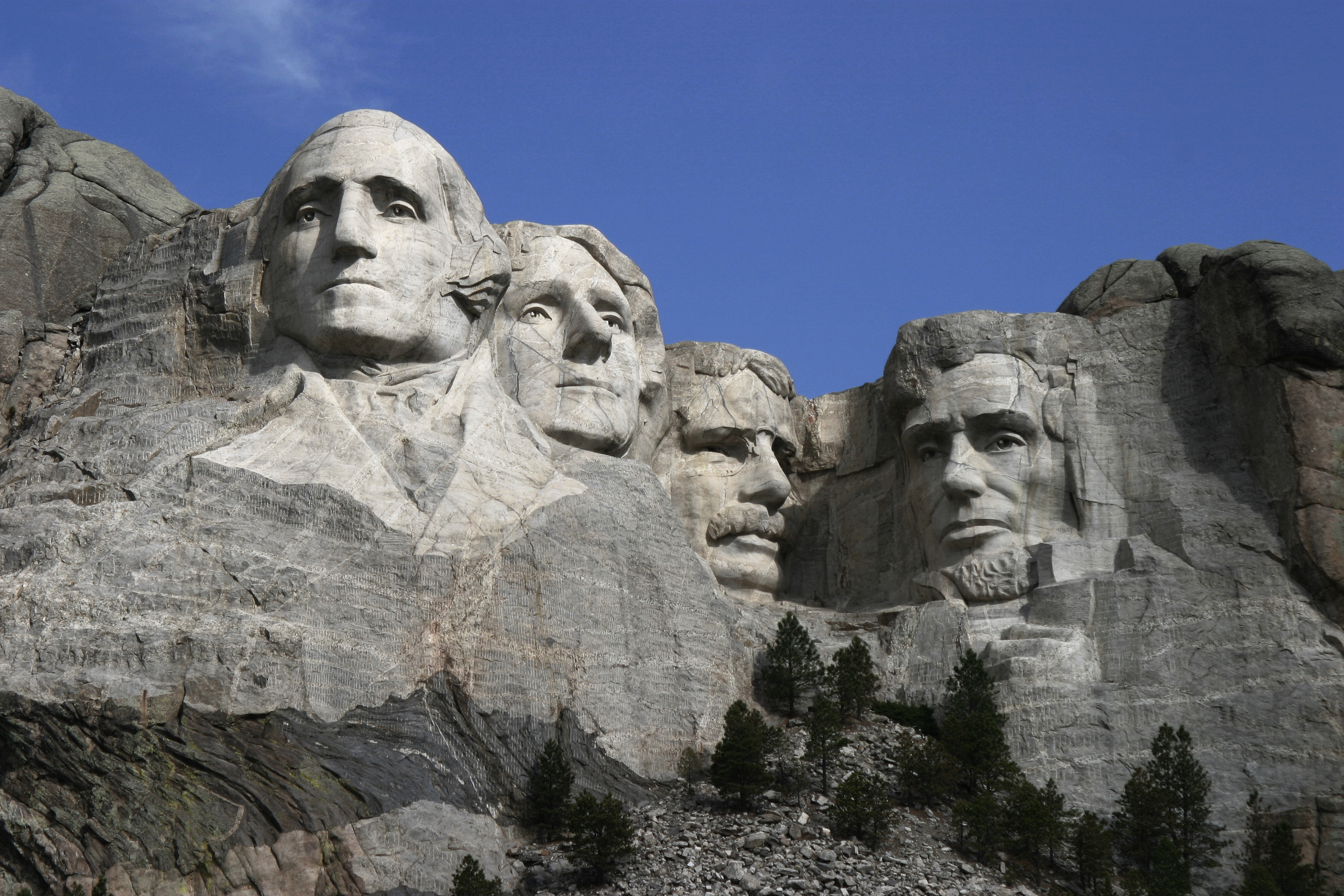
September 17: Lincoln's head is dedicated at Mount Rushmore.

- September 2 – The Great Hong Kong Typhoon kills an estimated 11,000 persons.
- September 5
  - Roberto Ortiz is elected president of Argentina.
  - Spanish Civil War: The city of Llanes falls to the Falangists.
- September 7 – CBS broadcasts a two-and-a-half hour memorial concert nationwide on radio in memory of George Gershwin, live from the Hollywood Bowl. Many celebrities appear, including Oscar Levant, Fred Astaire, Otto Klemperer, Lily Pons and members of the original cast of Porgy and Bess. The concert is recorded and released complete years later in what is excellent sound for its time, on CD. The Los Angeles Philharmonic is the featured orchestra.
- September 10 – Nine nations meet in the Nyon Conference, led by the United Kingdom and France, to address international piracy in the Mediterranean.
- September 17 – Abraham Lincoln's head is dedicated at Mount Rushmore.
- September 19 – Swiss professional ice hockey club HC Ambrì-Piotta is founded.
- September 21 – George Allen & Unwin, Ltd. of London publishes the first edition of J. R. R. Tolkien's The Hobbit.
- September 25 – Second Sino-Japanese War - Battle of Pingxingguan: The Communist Chinese Eighth Route Army defeats the Japanese.
- September 27 – The last recorded Bali tiger dies.
- September 30 – Hedy Lamarr, an Austrian-born actress of Jewish descent, arrives in New York City to flee from her possessive husband, Friedrich Mandl, who made arms agreements with the Nazis, and to begin her Hollywood career.

=== October ===
- October 1 – The Marihuana Tax Act becomes law in the United States.
- October 2–8 – Parsley Massacre: Under the orders of President Rafael Trujillo, Dominican troops kill thousands of Haitians living in the Dominican Republic.
- October 3 – Second Sino-Japanese War: Japanese troops advance toward Nanjing, capital of the Republic of China.
- October 5 – Roosevelt gives his famous Quarantine Speech in Chicago.
- October 9 – Jimmie Angel lands his plane on top of Devil's Mountain; however, the plane gets damaged, and he has to trek through the rainforest for help.
- October 11 – Duke and Duchess of Windsor's 1937 tour of Germany: The Duke and Duchess of Windsor arrive in Berlin to begin a 12-day tour of Nazi Germany, meeting Adolf Hitler on the 22nd.
- October 13 – Germany, in a note to Brussels, guarantees the inviolability and integrity of Belgium so long as the latter abstains from military action against Germany.
- October 15 – Ernest Hemingway's novel To Have and Have Not is first published, in the United States.
- October 18–21 – Spanish Civil War: The whole Spanish northern seaboard falls into the Falangists' hands; Republican forces in Gijón, Spain, set fire to petrol reserves prior to retreating before the advancing Falangists.
- October 23 – 1937 Australian federal election: Joseph Lyons' UAP/Country Coalition government is re-elected with a slightly increased majority, defeating the Labor Party led by John Curtin.
- October 25 – Celâl Bayar forms the new (ninth) government of Turkey.

=== November ===
- November 5 – World War II: In the Reich Chancellery, Adolf Hitler holds a secret meeting and states his plans for acquiring "living space" for the German people (recorded in the Hossbach Memorandum).
- November 6 – Italy joins the Anti-Comintern Pact.
- November 9 – Second Sino-Japanese War: Japanese troops take Shanghai.
- November 10 – Brazilian president Getúlio Vargas announces the Estado Novo ("New State"), thence becoming dictator of Brazil until 1945.
- November 11 – The Kogushi Sulfur Mine collapse, in western Gunma, Japan, kills at least 245 people.
- November 15 – Batuling Bantayao Gumander, Filipino politician and Moro revolutionary leader.

=== December ===
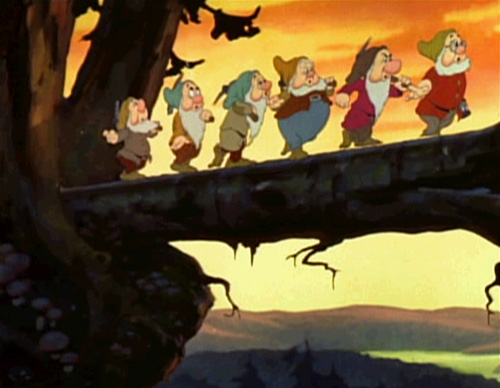
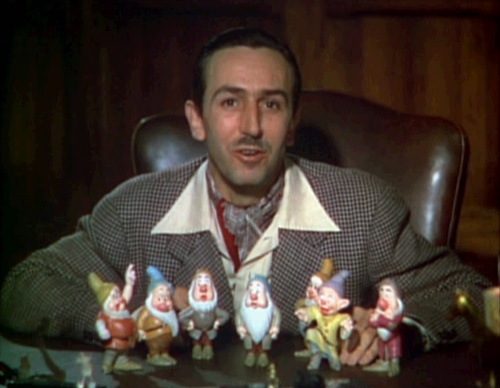
December 21: Walt Disney's Snow White and the Seven Dwarfs is released, the world's first full-length animated feature film, the first Disney film, and the first film to feature a Disney Princess. The top image shows the Seven Dwarfs singing "Heigh-Ho" while walking on a log. The second top image shows Walt Disney introducing the Seven Dwarfs in the trailer and the bottom images are the trailers.
- December 1 – Second Sino-Japanese War: The Battle of Nanjing begins.
- December 4 – The Dandy comic is first published in Scotland; it continued until 2012 as a physical publication, then online until 2013.
- December 11 – Italy withdraws from the League of Nations.
- December 12
  - USS Panay incident: Japanese bombers sink the American gunboat USS Panay on the Yangtze in China; the United States accepts the Japanese statement that this was unintentional.
  - Mae West makes a risqué guest appearance on NBC's Chase and Sanborn Hour, which eventually results in her being banned from radio.
- December 13 – Second Sino-Japanese War: The Battle of Nanjing ends with the Japanese occupying the city. In the Nanjing Massacre which follows, Japanese soldiers kill over 200,000 Chinese in 3 months. A few days previously, the Nationalist government of China had moved its capital to the southwestern city Chongqing.
- December 16 – The original production of the musical Me and My Girl opens at the Victoria Palace Theatre, in London's West End. A later revival will win an award.
- December 21 – Walt Disney's Snow White and the Seven Dwarfs, the world's first feature-length cel animated film, premieres at the Carthay Circle Theatre in Los Angeles.
- December 25 – At the age of 70, conductor Arturo Toscanini conducts the NBC Symphony Orchestra on radio for the first time, beginning his successful 17-year tenure with that orchestra. This first concert consists of music by Vivaldi (at a time when he is seldom played), Mozart, and Brahms. Millions tune in to listen, including U.S. President Franklin Delano Roosevelt.
- December 29 – The new Constitution of Ireland (Bunreacht na hÉireann) comes into force. The Irish Free State becomes "Ireland", and Éamon de Valera becomes the first Taoiseach (prime minister) of the new state. A Presidential Commission (made up the Chief Justice, the Speaker of Dáil Éireann, and the President of the High Court) assumes the powers of the new presidency, pending the popular election of the first President of Ireland in June 1938. The new constitution prohibits divorce.

=== Date unknown ===
- Switzerland begins construction of its Border Line defences.
- The Vibora Luviminda sugar plantation trade unions strike on Maui island, Hawaii.
- Italian psychiatrist Amarro Fiamberti is the first to document a transorbital approach to the brain, which becomes the basis for the controversial medical procedure of transorbital lobotomy.
- Soviet industry produces about four times as much as it had in 1928.
- The Allen Organ Company, builder of church, home and theatre organs, is founded in Macungie, Pennsylvania.
- Slavery in Bahrain is abolished.

== Births ==
=== January ===
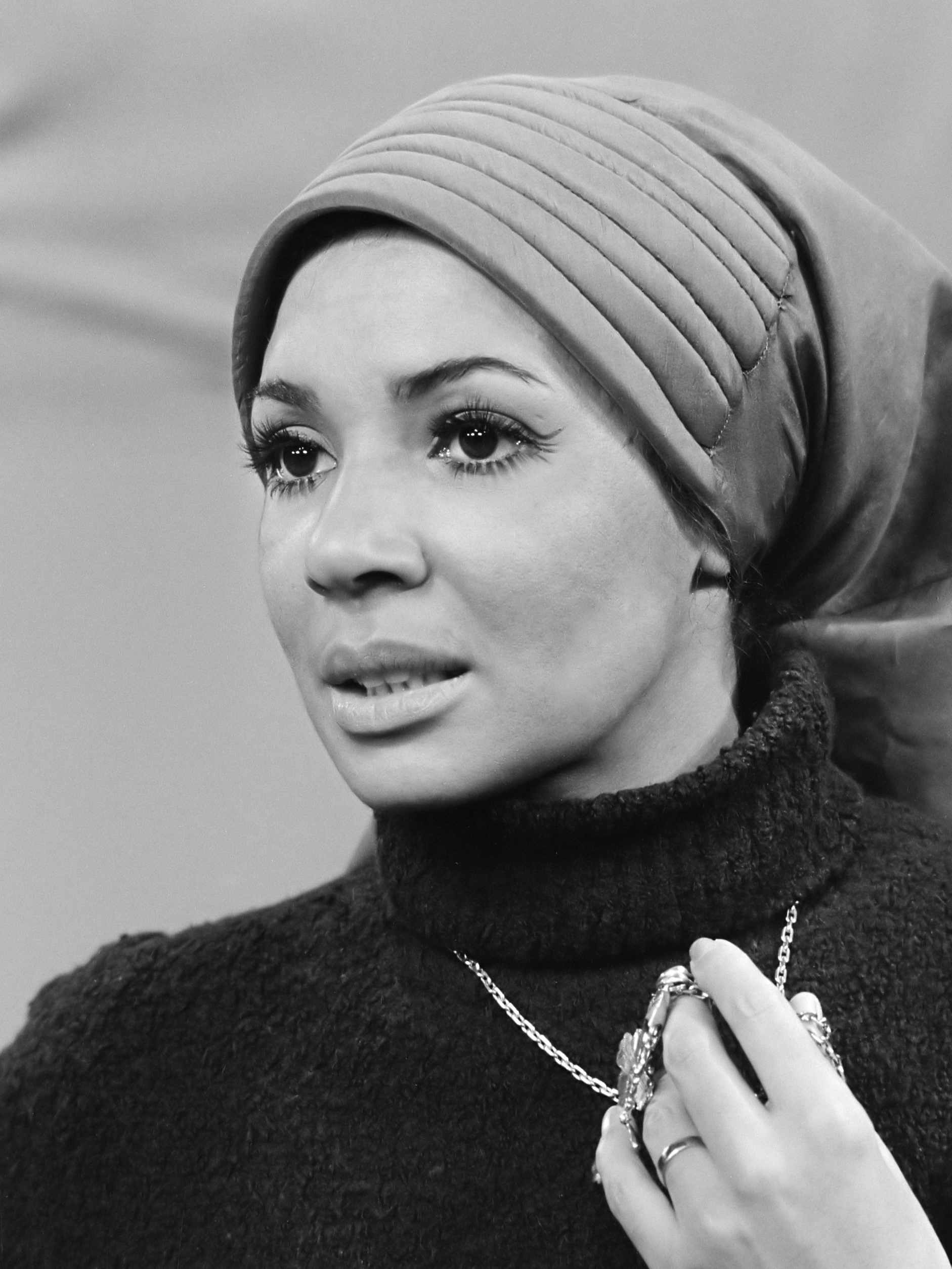
Shirley Bassey

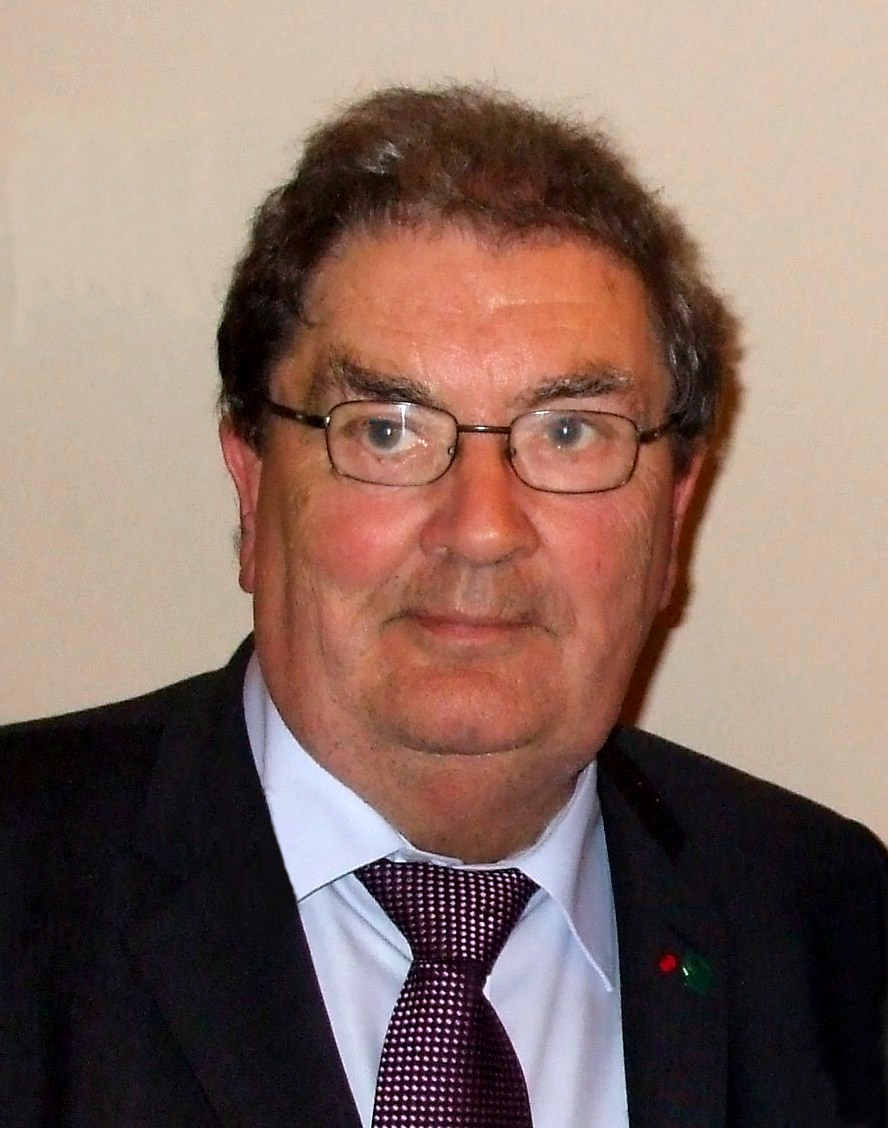
John Hume

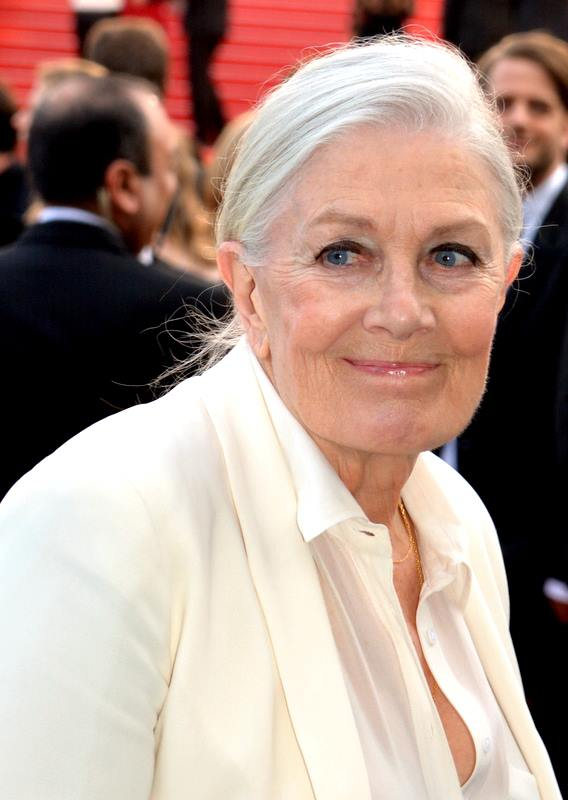
Vanessa Redgrave

- January 1 – Philip Akot Akok Kiir, South Sudanese pastor, former educator and politician
- January 3 – Nadia Lutfi, Egyptian actress (d. 2020)
- January 4
  - Grace Bumbry, African American opera singer (d. 2023)
  - Dyan Cannon, American actress, film director and screenwriter
- January 6
  - Paolo Conte, Italian singer, pianist and composer
  - Harri Holkeri, 36th Prime Minister of Finland (d. 2011)
- January 8 – Dame Shirley Bassey, Welsh singer
- January 13 – Ati George Sokomanu, President of Vanuatu
- January 15 – Margaret O'Brien, American child actress
- January 16 – Francis George, American cardinal (d. 2015)
- January 18
  - Yukio Endō, Japanese gymnast (d. 2009)
  - John Hume, Northern Irish politician, Nobel Peace Prize laureate (d. 2020)
- January 19
  - Princess Birgitta of Sweden (d. 2024)
  - Joseph Nye, American political scientist (d. 2025)
- January 21 – Prince Max, Duke in Bavaria, heir to the Bavarian Royal House
- January 22 – Joseph Wambaugh, American author (d. 2025)
- January 25 – Ange-Félix Patassé, 5th President of Central African Republic (d. 2011)
- January 30
  - Vanessa Redgrave, British actress
  - Boris Spassky, Russian chess grandmaster (d. 2025)
- January 31
  - Philip Glass, American composer
  - Suzanne Pleshette, American actress (d. 2008)

=== February ===
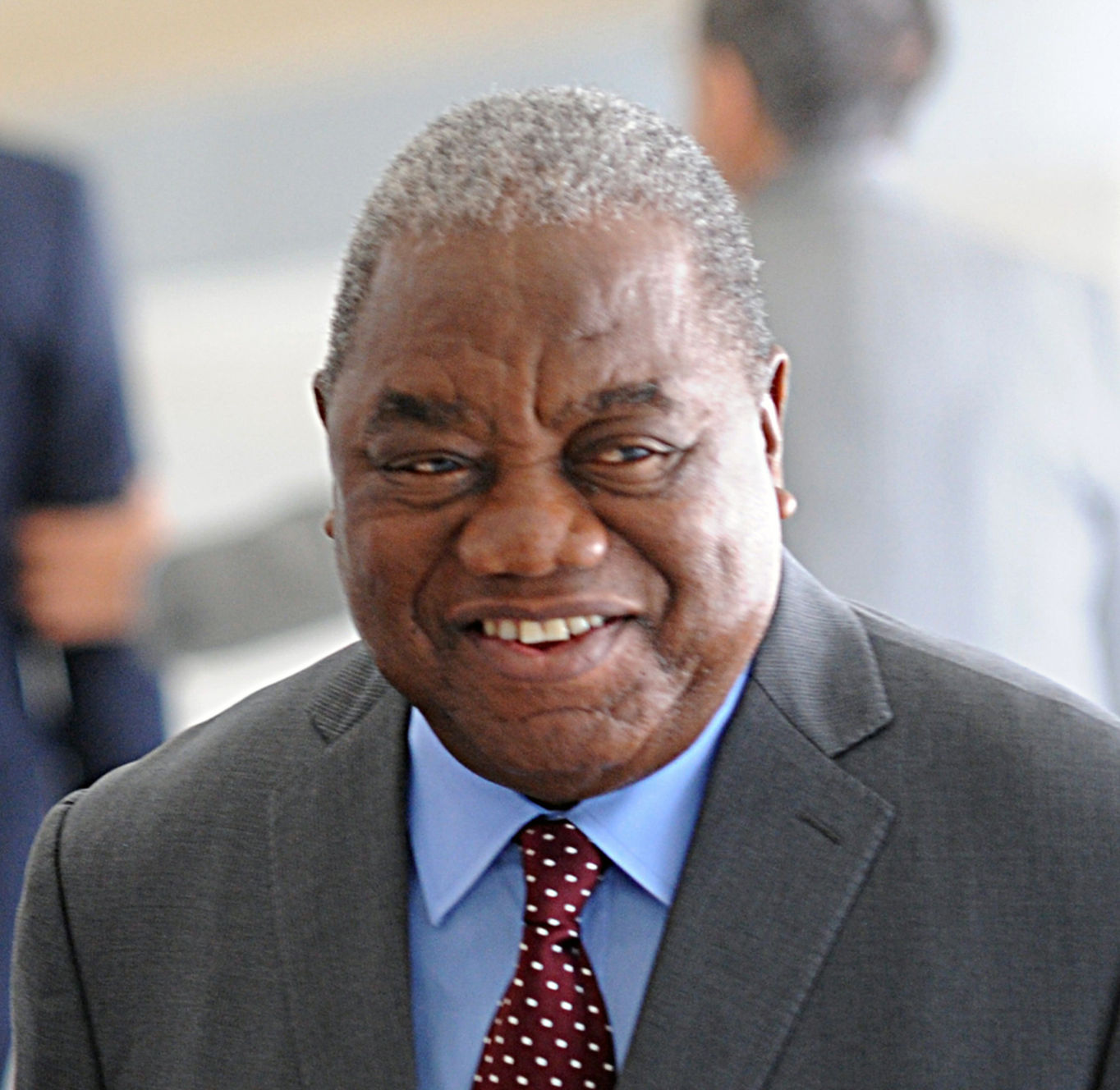
Rupiah Banda

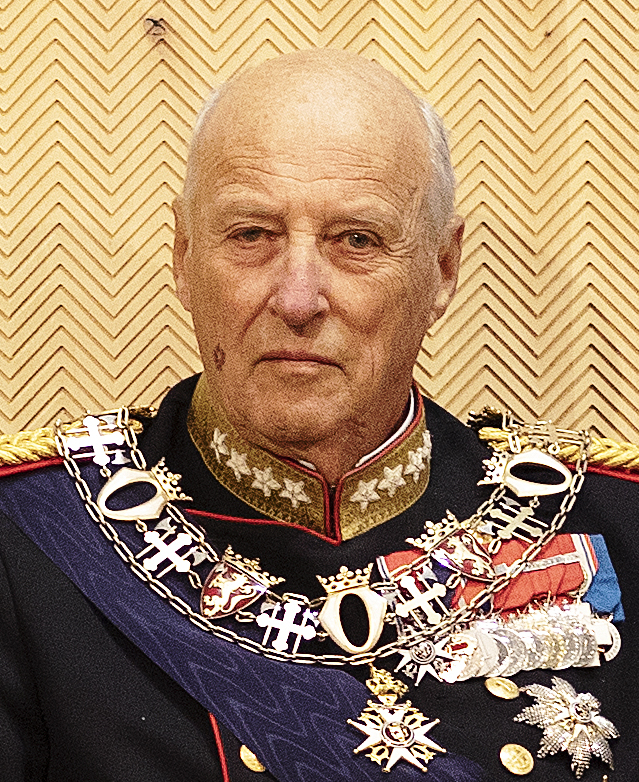
Harald V of Norway

- February 1 – Don Everly, American rock and roll singer and musician (d. 2021)
- February 2
  - Tom Smothers, American musician, comedian (The Smothers Brothers) (d. 2023)
  - Eric Arturo Delvalle, Panamanian lawyer (d. 2015)
- February 4 – Magnar Solberg, Norwegian biathlete
- February 5 – Gaston Roelants, Belgian Olympic athlete
- February 8 – Harry Wu, Chinese human rights activist (d. 2016)
- February 9 – Fazle Haque, Bengali state minister
- February 10 – Roberta Flack, African-American singer (d. 2025)
- February 11 – Bill Lawry, Australian cricketer
- February 12 – Charles Dumas, American athlete (d. 2004)
- February 13 – Rupiah Banda, 4th President of Zambia (d. 2022)
- February 20
  - Robert Huber, German chemist and Nobel laureate
  - Nancy Wilson, African-American singer and actress (d. 2018)
- February 21
  - Ron Clarke, Australian runner (d. 2015)
  - King Harald V of Norway (d. 2026)
  - Jilly Cooper, English author (d. 2025)
- February 25
  - Sir Tom Courtenay, English actor
  - Nazario Pardini, Italian poet, essayist and journalist

=== March ===
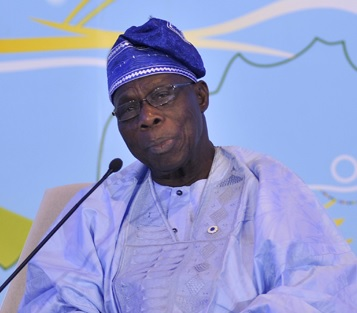
Olusegun Obasanjo

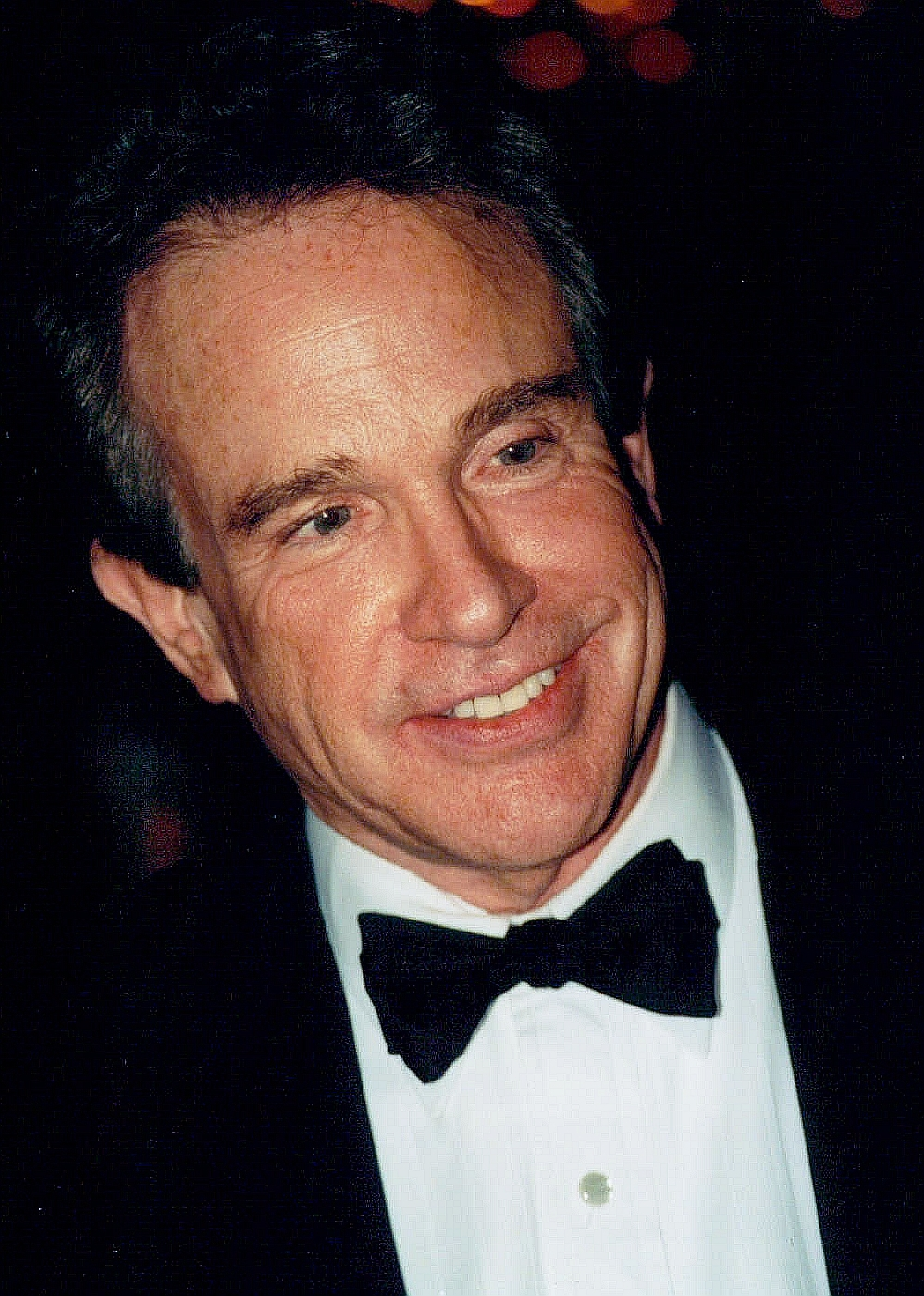
Warren Beatty

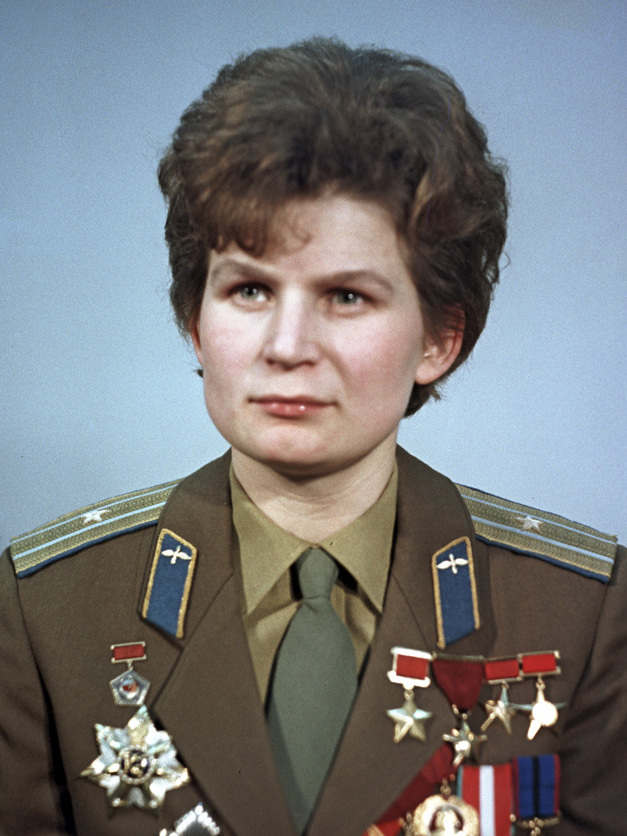
Valentina Tereshkova

- March 2 – Abdelaziz Bouteflika, President of Algeria (d. 2021)
- March 3 – Bobby Driscoll, American child actor and voice actor (d. 1968)
- March 4
  - Graham Dowling, New Zealand cricketer
  - Yuri Senkevich, Russian cosmonaut (d. 2003)
- March 5 – Olusegun Obasanjo, President of Nigeria
- March 6 – Valentina Tereshkova, Russian cosmonaut, first woman in space
- March 8 – Juvénal Habyarimana, 3rd President of Rwanda (d. 1994)
- March 9 – Paciano Aniceto, Archbishop-emeritus of Archdiocese of San Fernando.
- March 14 – Benny Paret, Cuban welterweight boxer (d. 1962)
- March 15 – Valentin Rasputin, Russian writer (d. 2015)
- March 18
  - Aleksei Zasukhin, Soviet boxer (d. 1996)
  - Rudi Altig, German road racing cyclist (d. 2016)
- March 22
  - Armin Hary, German athlete
  - Foo Foo Lammar, British drag queen (d. 2003)
  - Peter Vogel, German film actor (d. 1978)
- March 23 – Tony Burton, American actor (d. 2016)
- March 24 – Lloyd Erskine Sandiford, 4th Prime Minister of Barbados (d. 2023)
- March 26 – Prince Karl of Hesse, German prince (d. 2022)
- March 29
  - Billy Carter, American farmer, businessman, brewer, and politician (d. 1988)
  - Smarck Michel, 6th Prime Minister of Haiti (d. 2012)
- March 30 – Warren Beatty, American actor and director
- March 31
  - Robert Ackerman, American lawyer and politician (d. 2022)
  - Pino Pagani, Italian radio host and journalist (d. 2023)

=== April ===
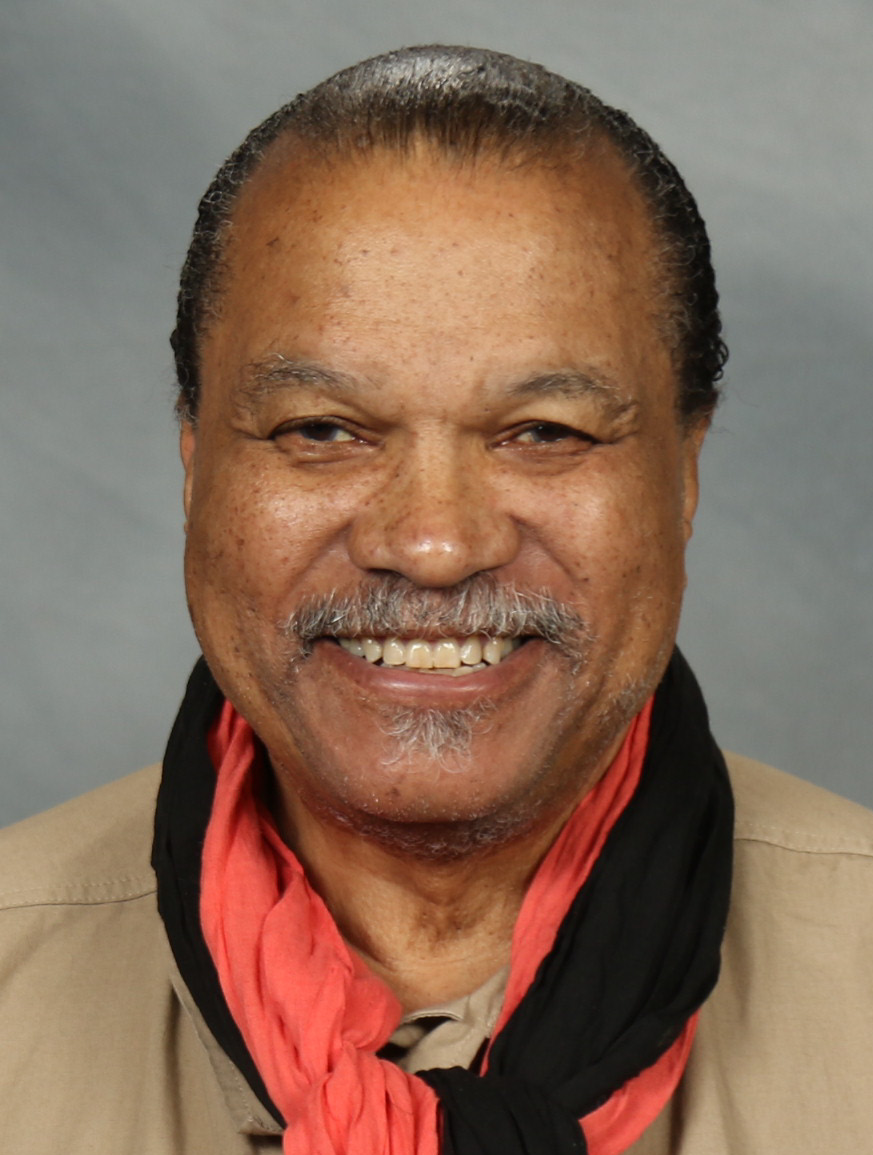
Billy Dee Williams

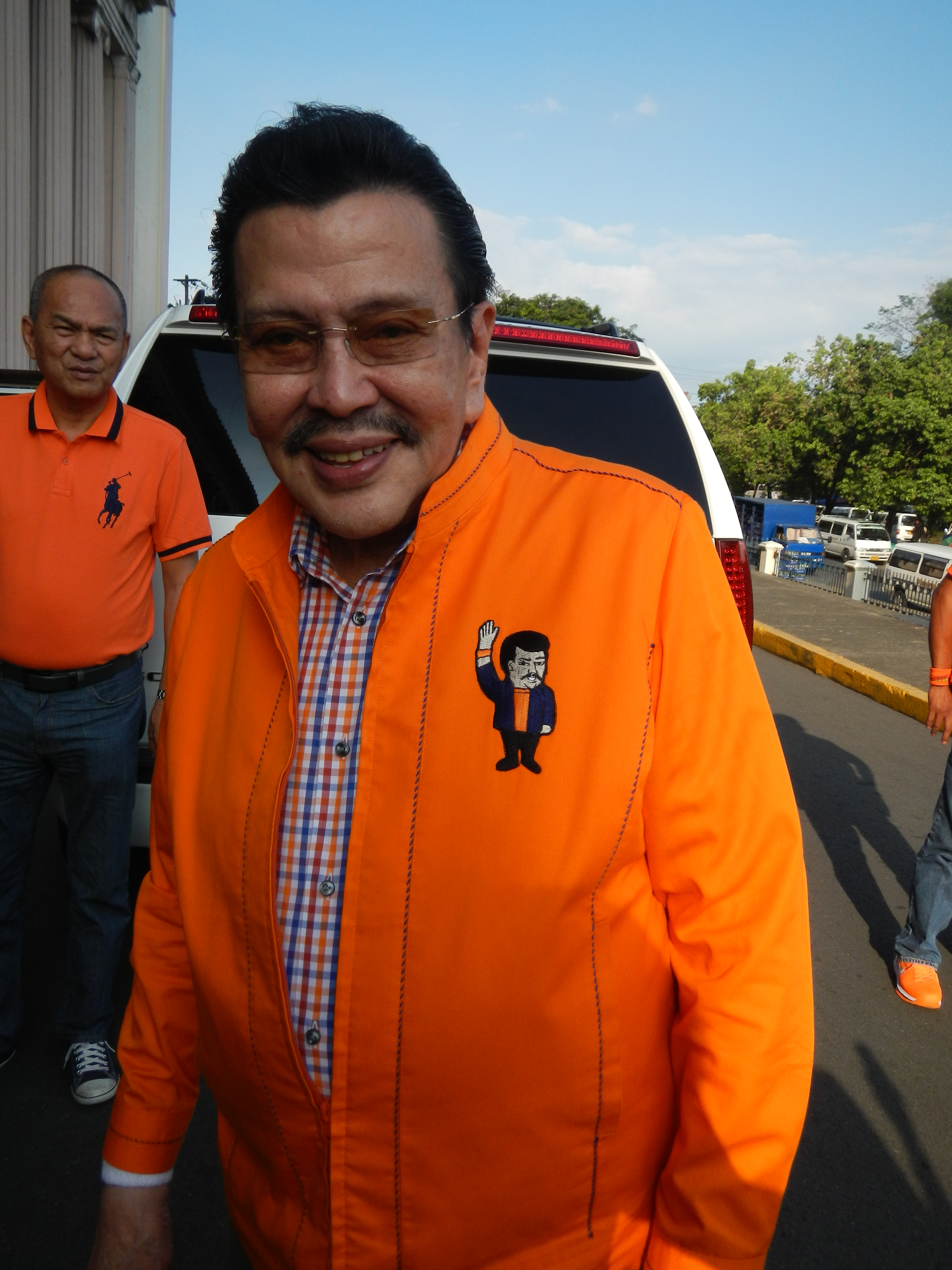
Joseph Estrada

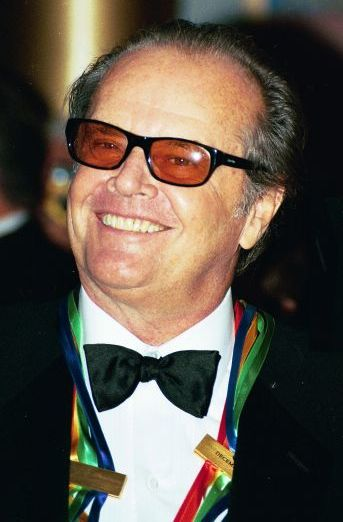
Jack Nicholson

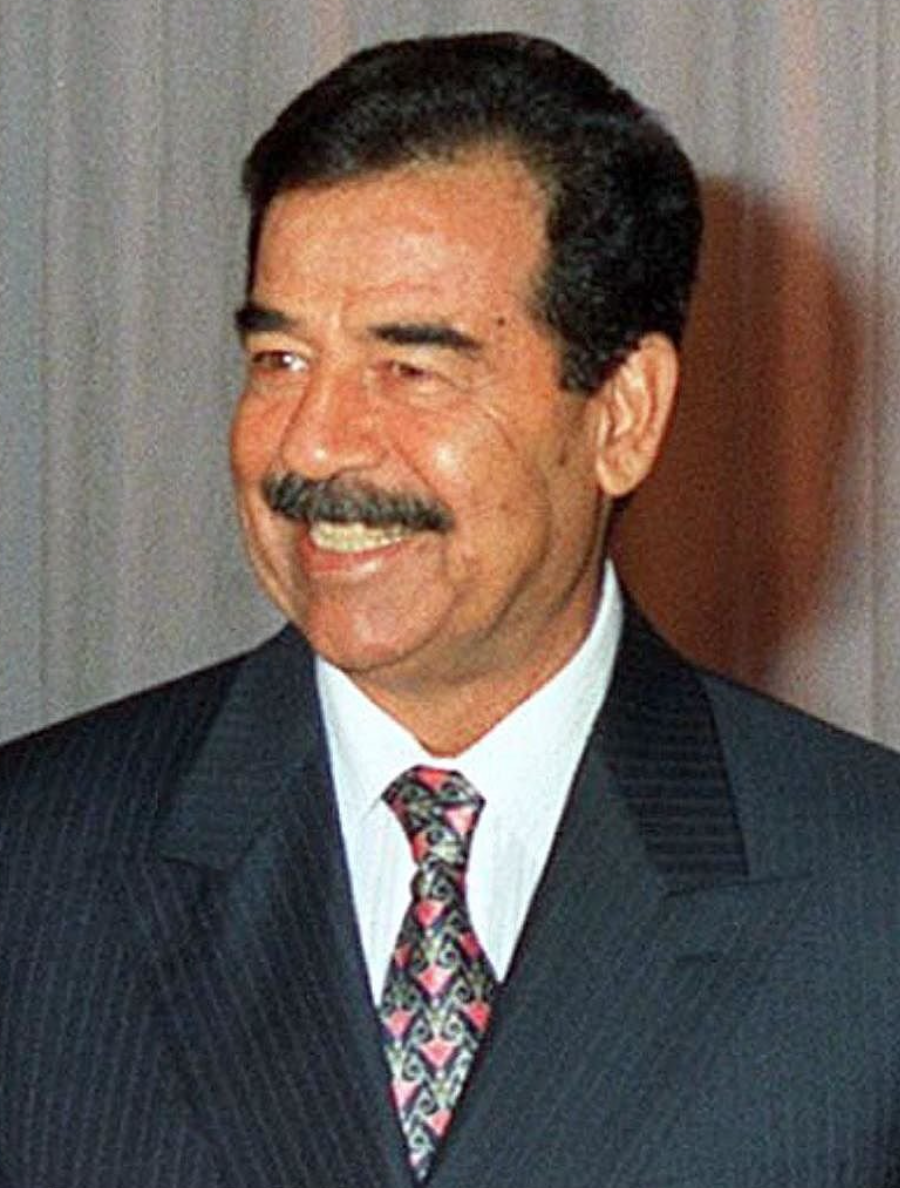
Saddam Hussein

- April 1
  - Mohammad Hamid Ansari, Indian politician, 12th Vice President of India
  - Yılmaz Güney, Palme d'Or award-winning Kurdish film director, scenarist, actor, novelist and activist (d. 1984)
- April 4 – Obed Dlamini, 6th Prime Minister of Swaziland (d. 2017)
- April 5
  - Maryanne Trump Barry, American attorney (d. 2023)
  - Colin Powell, American politician (d. 2021)
  - Guido Vildoso, 59th President of Bolivia
- April 6
  - Merle Haggard, American country musician (d. 2016)
  - Billy Dee Williams, African-American actor
- April 10 – Bella Akhmadulina, Russian poet (d. 2010)
- April 17 – Ferdinand Piëch, Austrian engineer, business magnate (d. 2019)
- April 19
  - Antonio Carluccio, Italian-born restaurateur (d. 2017)
  - Joseph Estrada, Filipino actor and politician, 13th President of the Philippines
- April 20 – George Takei, Japanese-American actor, director and author (Star Trek)
- April 22 – Jack Nicholson, American film actor and director
- April 24
  - Viktor Zubkov, Russian basketball player (d. 2016)
  - Joe Henderson, American jazz tenor saxophonist (d. 2001)
- April 26 – Jean-Pierre Beltoise, French racing driver (d. 2015)
- April 27 – Sandy Dennis, American actress (d. 1992)
- April 28 – Saddam Hussein, 5th President of Iraq (d. 2006)

=== May ===
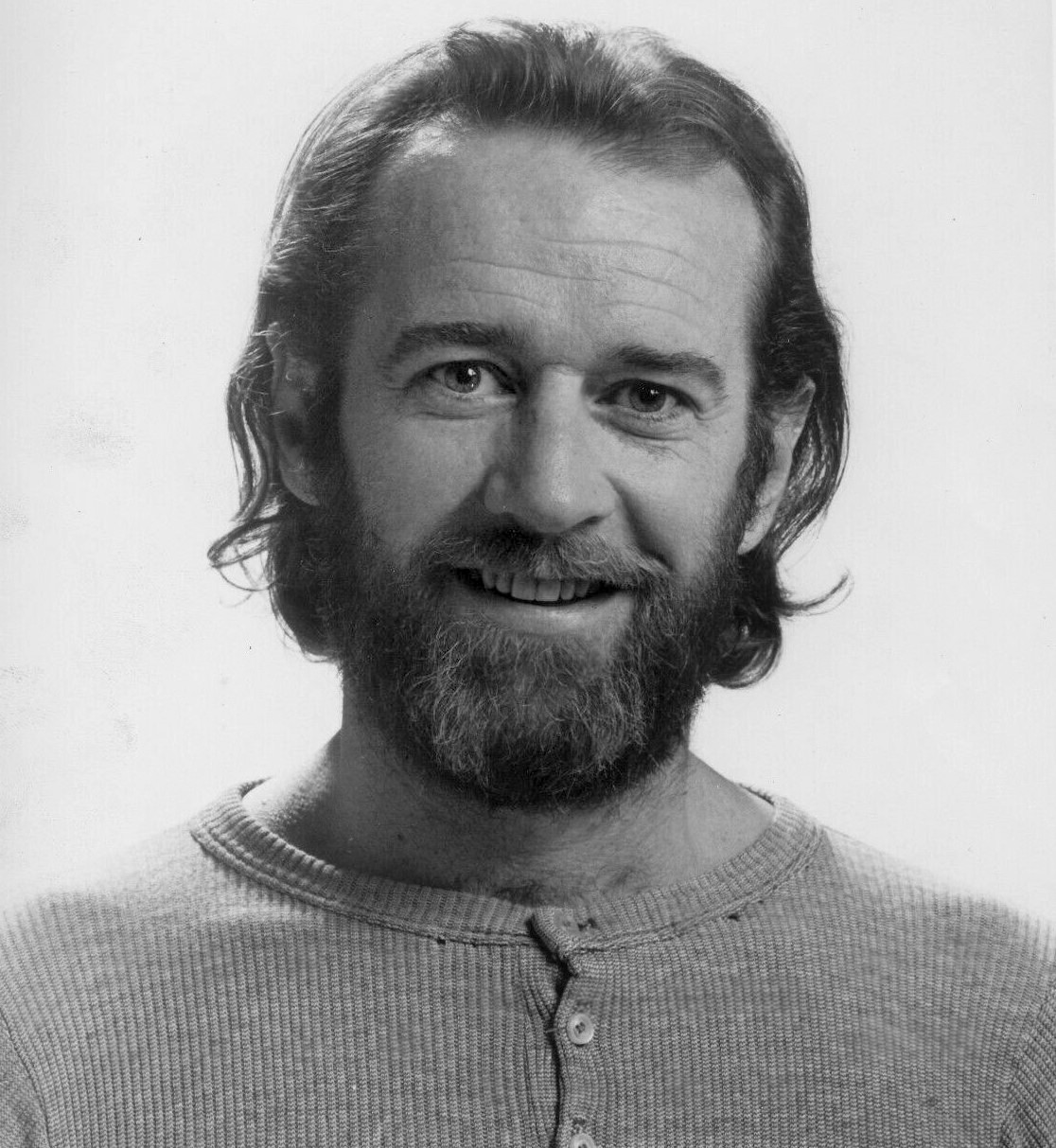
George Carlin

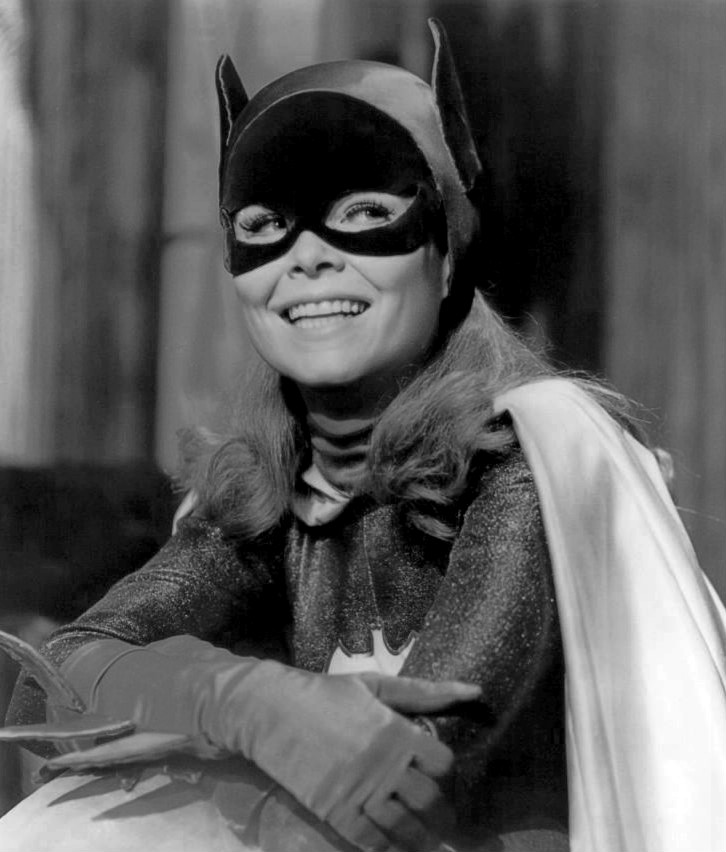
Yvonne Craig

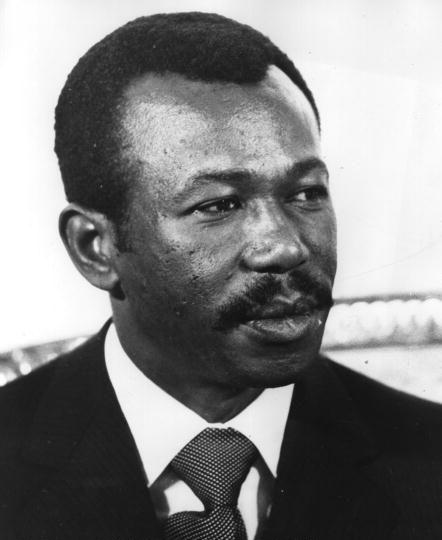
Mengistu Haile Mariam

- May 2 – Lorenzo Music, American actor, voice actor, writer, producer and musician (d. 2001)
- May 4 – Dick Dale, American guitarist (d. 2019)
- May 5 – Trần Đức Lương, 5th President of Vietnam (d. 2025)
- May 6 – Rubin "Hurricane" Carter, African-American boxer (d. 2014)
- May 8
  - Carlos Gaviria Díaz, Colombian justice, politician
  - Thomas Pynchon, American writer
- May 9 – Rafael Moneo, Spanish architect
- May 11 – Ildikó Újlaky-Rejtő, Hungarian Olympic and world champion foil fencer
- May 12 – George Carlin, American stand-up comedian (d. 2008)
- May 13 – Roger Zelazny, American writer (d. 1995)
- May 15
  - Madeleine Albright, Czech-born American politician and diplomat (d. 2022)
  - Trini Lopez, American singer, guitarist, and actor (d. 2020)
- May 16
  - Yvonne Craig, American actress (Batman) (d. 2015)
  - Robert B. Wilson, American economist, Nobel Prize laureate
- May 18 – Jacques Santer, Luxembourg politician, 20th Prime Minister of Luxembourg
- May 20 – Peter von Matt, Swiss philologist and author (d. 2025)
- May 21
  - Ricardo Alarcón, Cuban politician (d. 2022)
  - Sofiko Chiaureli, Georgian actress (d. 2008)
  - Mengistu Haile Mariam, President of Ethiopia
- May 22 – Facundo Cabral, Argentine singer (d. 2011)
- May 26– Henry I. Smith, American inventor and physicist

=== June ===
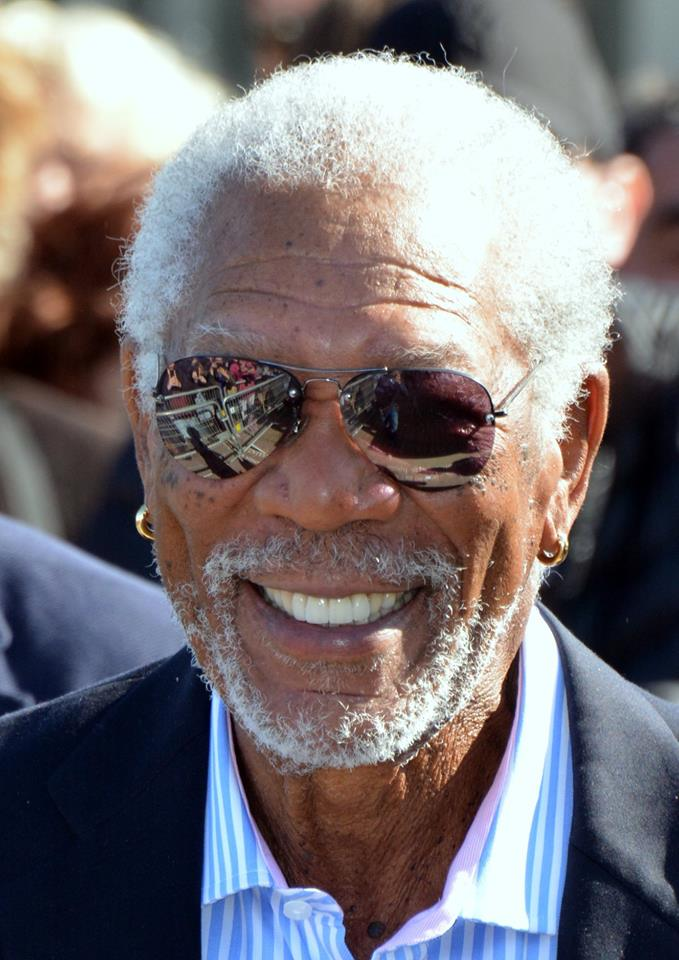
Morgan Freeman

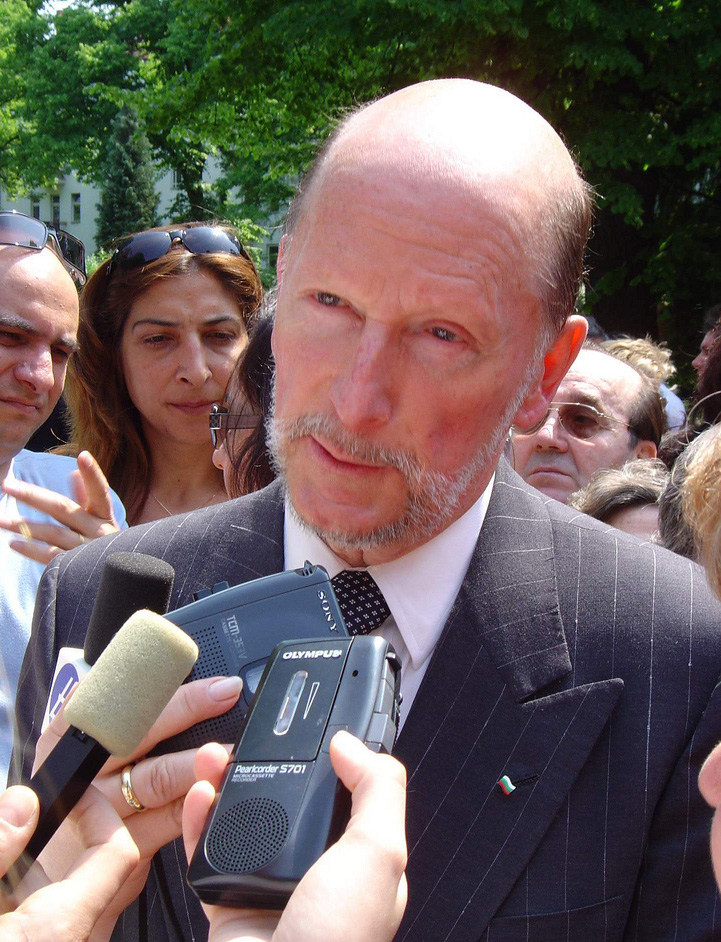
Simeon II

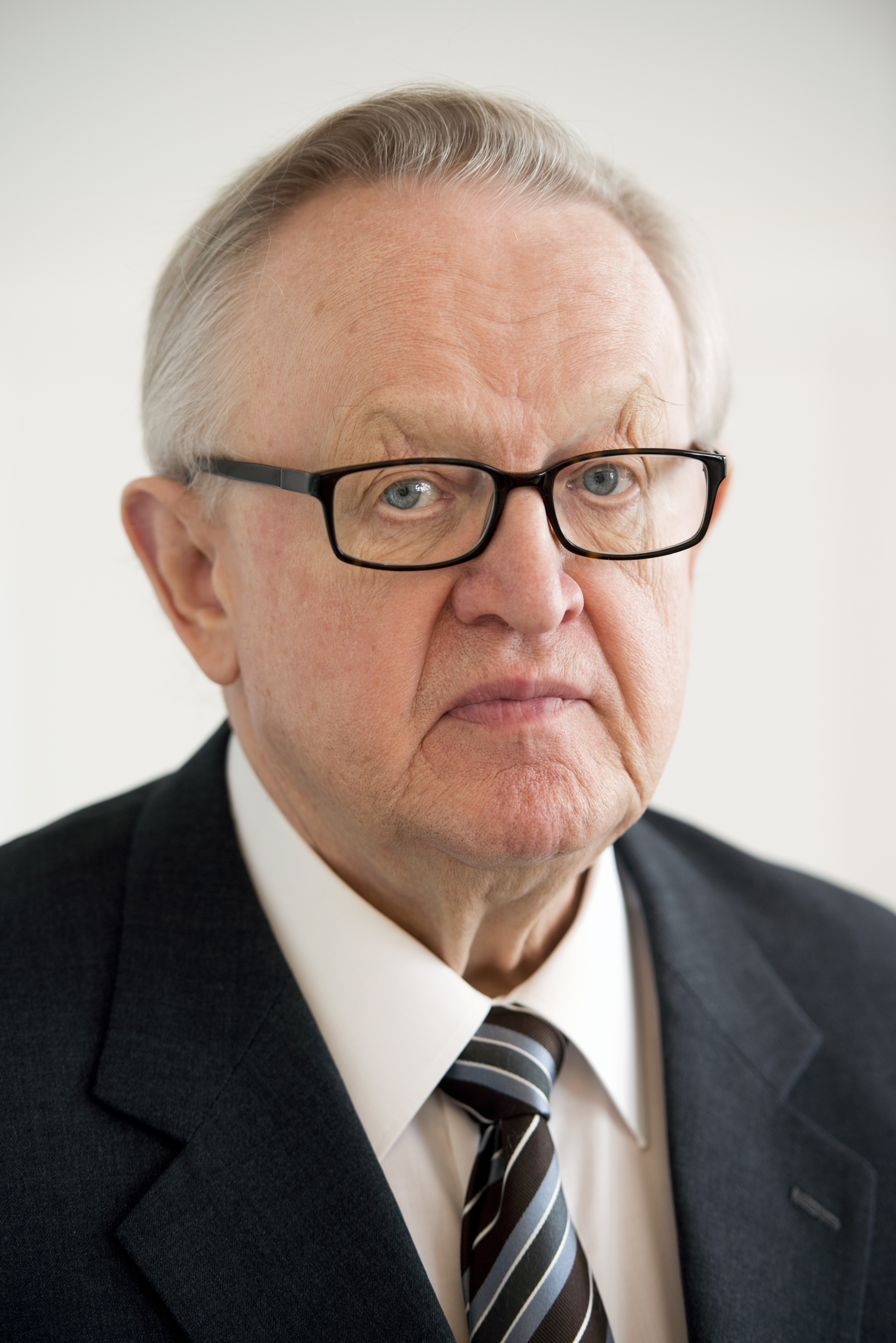
Martti Ahtisaari

- June 1
  - Morgan Freeman, African-American actor
  - Colleen McCullough, Australian author (d. 2015)
  - Ezio Pascutti, Italian footballer (d. 2017)
- June 7 – Neeme Järvi, Estonian conductor
- June 8 – Bruce McCandless II, American astronaut (d. 2017)
- June 11 – Robin Warren, Australian pathologist, recipient of the Nobel Prize in Physiology or Medicine (d. 2024)
- June 12 – Vladimir Arnold, Soviet-Russian mathematician (d. 2010)
- June 13 – Raj Reddy, Indian computer scientist
- June 15 – Waylon Jennings, American country singer (d. 2002)
- June 16
  - Simeon Saxe-Coburg-Gotha, Tsar of Bulgaria (1943–1946), 48th Prime Minister of Bulgaria (2001–2005)
  - Erich Segal, American author, screenwriter, and educator (d. 2010)
- June 18
  - Ronald Venetiaan, 6th and 8th President of Suriname (d. 2025)
  - Vitaly Zholobov, Soviet cosmonaut
- June 19 – André Glucksmann, French philosopher, author (d. 2015)
- June 23 – Martti Ahtisaari, 10th President of Finland, recipient of the Nobel Peace Prize (d. 2023)
- June 25
  - Nawaf Al-Ahmad Al-Jaber Al-Sabah, Emir of Kuwait (d. 2023)
  - Keizō Obuchi, 54th Prime Minister of Japan (d. 2000)
- June 26 – Robert Coleman Richardson, American physicist, Nobel Prize laureate (d. 2013)
- June 30 – Warren John Nutter, American murderer (d. 2021)

=== July ===
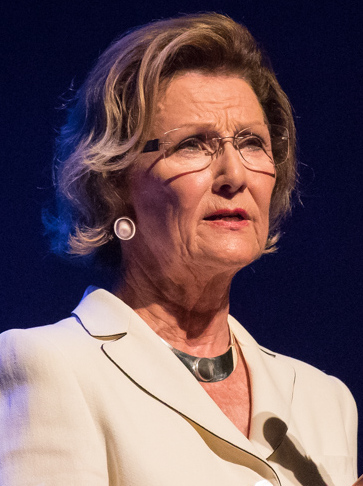
Queen Sonja of Norway

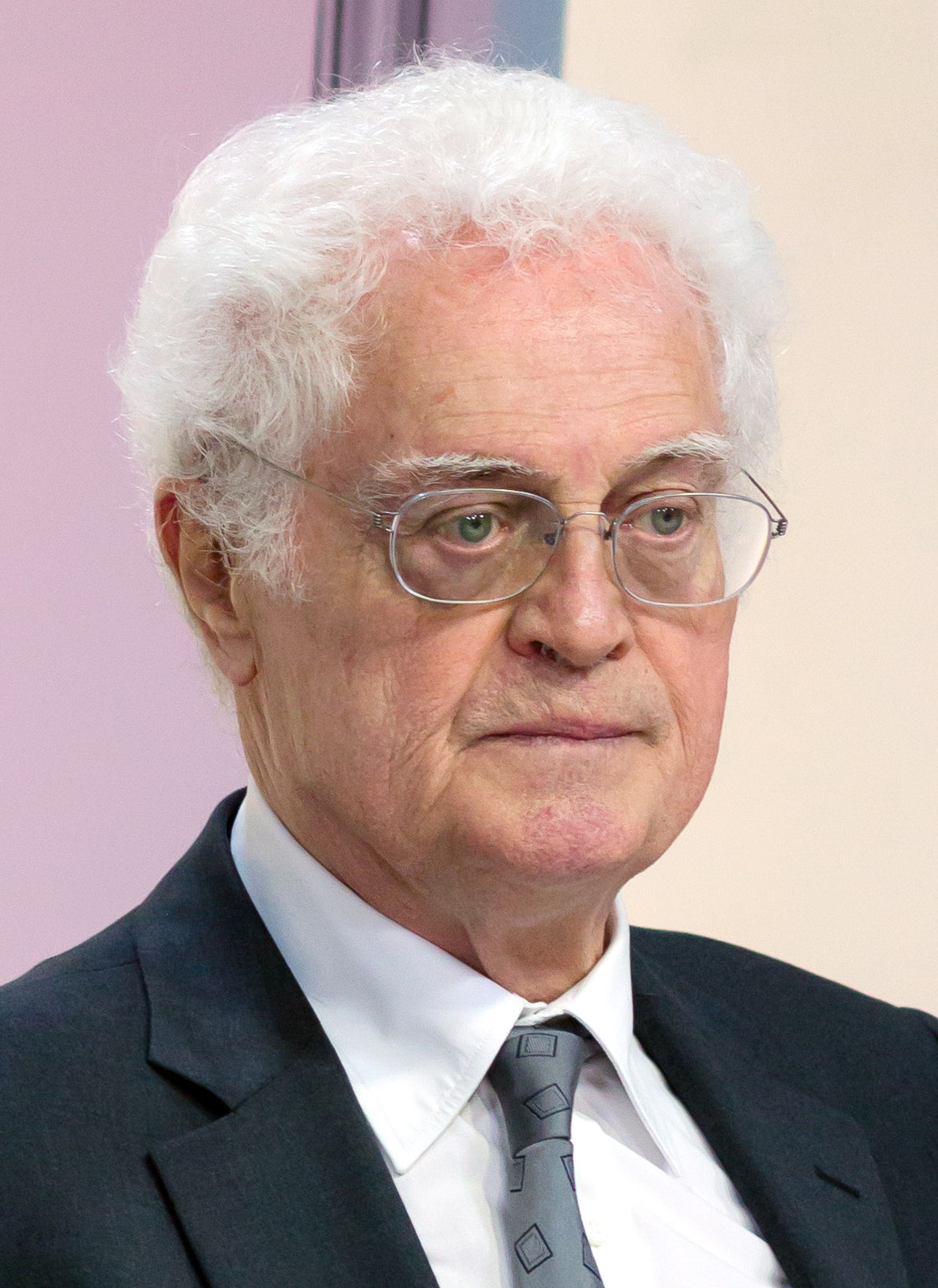
Lionel Jospin

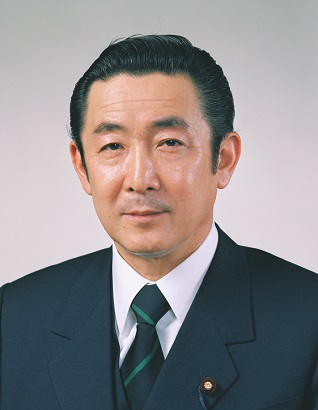
Ryutaro Hashimoto

- July 2 – Richard Petty, American stock car racer, 7-time NASCAR Winston Cup champion
- July 3
  - Hacen Mefti, Algerian politician
  - Hiroko Mori, Micronesian politician
  - Tom Stoppard, Czech-born British playwright and screenwriter (d. 2025)
- July 4 – Queen Sonja of Norway
- July 5 – Jo de Roo, Dutch road racing cyclist
- July 6
  - Vladimir Ashkenazy, Russian pianist
  - Ned Beatty, American actor (d. 2021)
  - Michael Sata, 5th President of Zambia (d. 2014)
  - Gene Chandler, American singer, songwriter, and music producer
- July 7
  - Giovanni Arrighi, Italian economist, sociologist and world-systems analyst (d. 2009)
  - Lars-Erik Larsson, Swedish rowing coxswain
  - Nanami Shiono, Japanese author, novelist
  - Tung Chee-hwa, Hong Kong businessman and politician (d. 2026)
- July 9 – David Hockney, English-born artist (d. 2026)
- July 12
  - Bill Cosby, African-American actor, comedian, educator and convicted sex offender
  - Lionel Jospin, Prime Minister of France (d. 2026)
- July 14 – Yoshirō Mori, 55th Prime Minister of Japan
- July 17 – Jaberi Bidandi Ssali, Ugandan politician, businessman
- July 18
  - Roald Hoffmann, Polish-born chemist and Nobel laureate
  - Hunter S. Thompson, American author and journalist (d. 2005)
- July 22 – Adrienne Hill, British actress appeared in 199 Park Lane and Doctor Who (d. 1997)
- July 24 – Manoj Kumar, Indian actor and director (d. 2025)
- July 27 – Mirko Marjanović, 63rd Prime Minister of Serbia (d. 2006)
- July 29
  - Ryutaro Hashimoto, 53rd Prime Minister of Japan (d. 2006)
  - Daniel McFadden, American economist and Nobel laureate

=== August ===
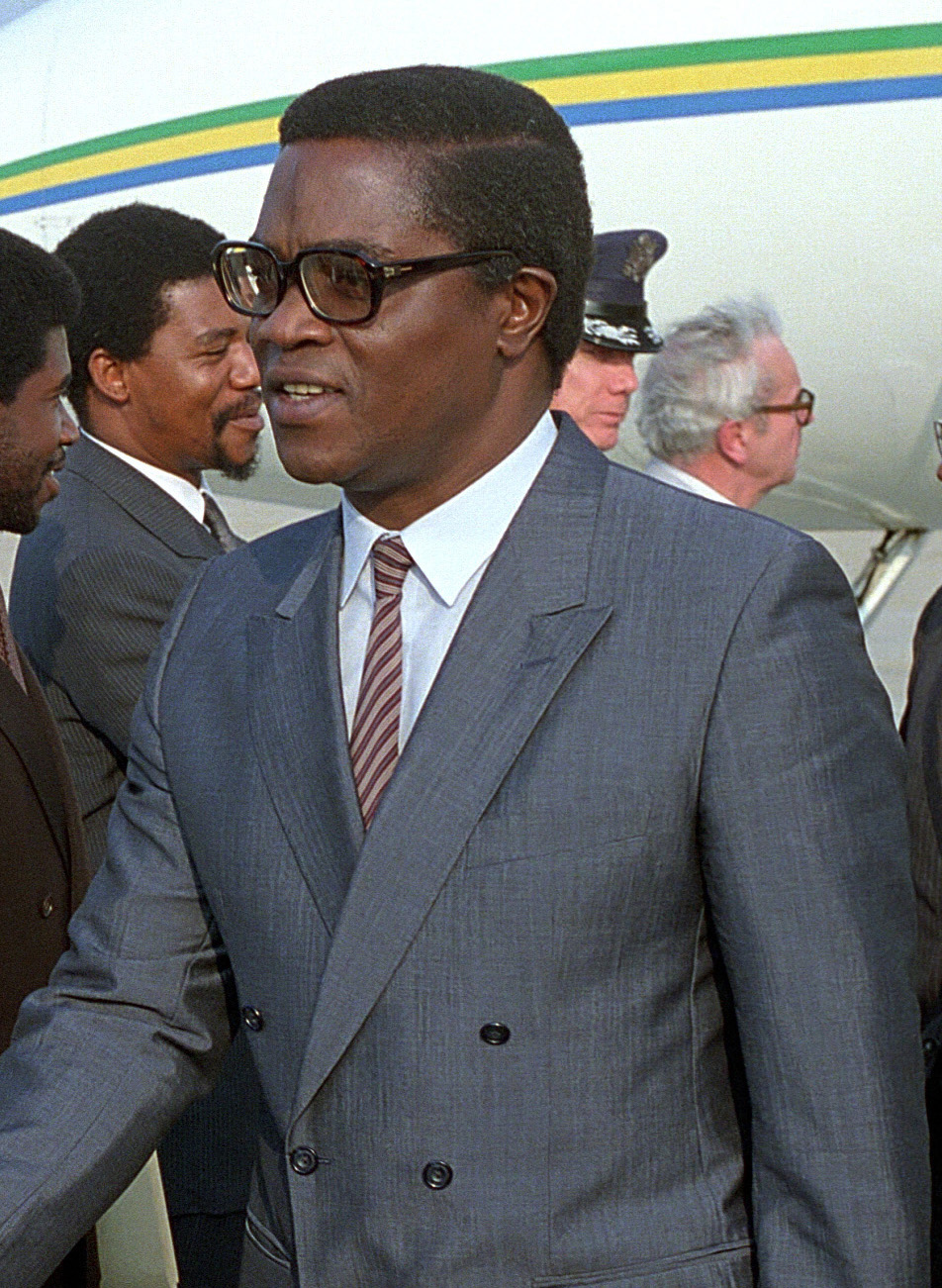
Manuel Pinto da Costa

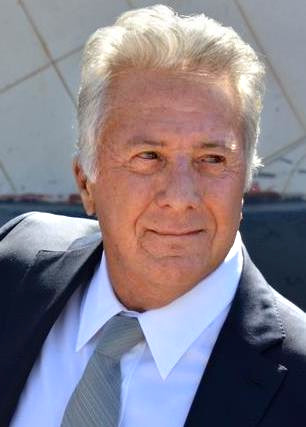
Dustin Hoffman

- August 2 – María Duval, Mexican actress and singer
- August 3 – Andrés Gimeno, Spanish tennis player (d. 2019)
- August 5 – Manuel Pinto da Costa, Santoméan politician, 1st President of São Tomé and Príncipe
- August 6 – Charlie Haden, American jazz bassist (d. 2014)
- August 8
  - Dustin Hoffman, American actor, director (The Graduate)
  - S. Dhanabalan, Singaporean politician
- August 11 – Dieter Kemper, German cyclist (d. 2018)
- August 15 – Bounnhang Vorachith, 14th Prime Minister, 6th President of Laos
- August 18 – Jean Alingué Bawoyeu, Chadian politician, former Prime Minister
- August 21
  - Donald Dewar, First Minister of Scotland (d. 2000)
  - Gustavo Noboa, President of Ecuador (d. 2021)
- August 22
  - Rima Melati, Indonesian actress and singer (d. 2022)
  - Francesco Musso, Italian Olympic boxer
- August 26 – Gennady Yanayev, former Soviet leader (d. 2010)
- August 27 – Alice Coltrane, African-American jazz harpist, organist, pianist and composer (d. 2007)
- August 30 – Bruce McLaren, New Zealand founder of McLaren Racing (d. 1970)

=== September ===
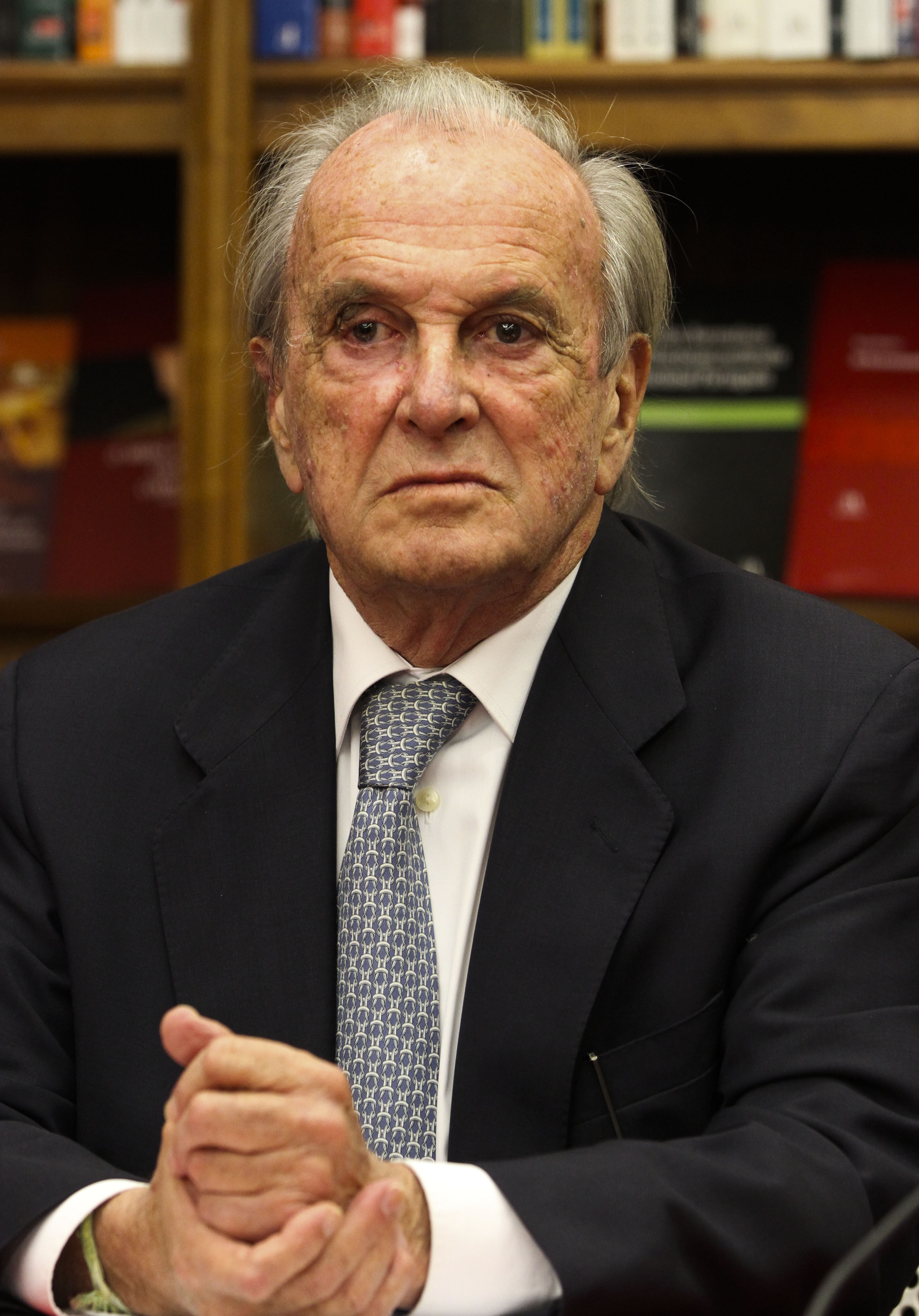
Francisco Pinto Balsemão

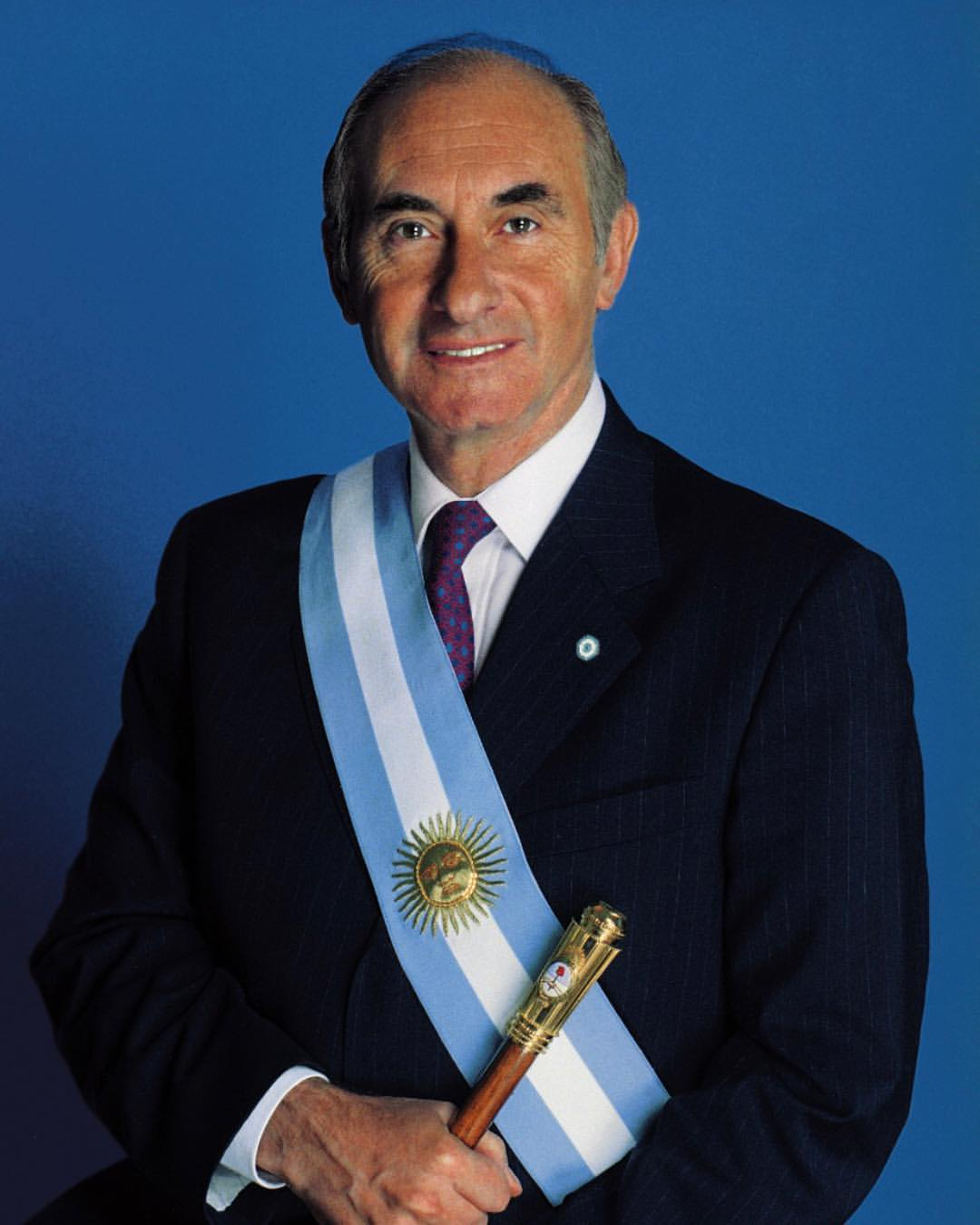
Fernando de la Rúa

- September 1 – Francisco Pinto Balsemão, Portuguese politician, 111th Prime Minister of Portugal (d. 2025)
- September 2 – Len Carlson, Canadian voice actor (d. 2006)
- September 4 – Dawn Fraser, Australian swimmer
- September 5 – Antonio Angelillo, Italian-Argentine footballer (d. 2018)
- September 6 – Jo Anne Worley, American Actress, Comedienne and singer
- September 7 – John Phillip Law, American actor (d. 2008)
- September 9 – Alí Rodríguez Araque, Venezuelan politician, lawyer and diplomat (d. 2018)
- September 10 – Jared Diamond, American geographer, anthropologist, and author
- September 11 – Paola Ruffo di Calabria, Italian-born Queen of the Belgians
- September 12 – Henri Lopes, Congolese politician, 5th Prime Minister of Congo-Brazzaville (d. 2023)
- September 15
  - Robert Lucas Jr., American economist and Nobel laureate (d. 2023)
  - Fernando de la Rúa, Argentine politician, 43rd President of Argentina (d. 2019)
- September 20 – Monica Zetterlund, Swedish singer and actress (d. 2005)
- September 25 – Ezra Dotan, Israeli fighter pilot and flying ace (d. 1981)
- September 26 – Jerry Weintraub, American film producer and talent agent (d. 2015)
- September 28 – Bob Schul, American Olympic athlete (d. 2024)
- September 30 – Daniel Filho, Brazilian film producer, director, actor, and screenwriter

=== October ===
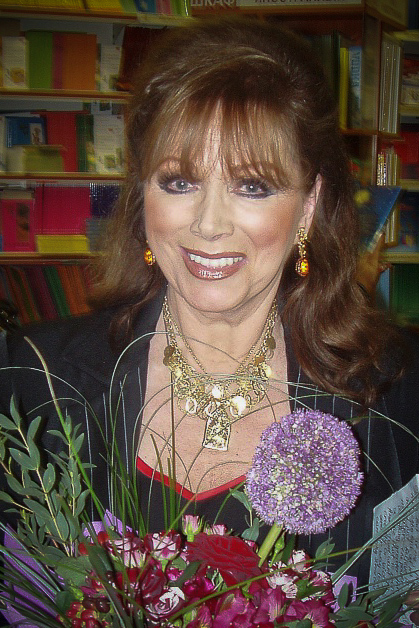
Jackie Collins

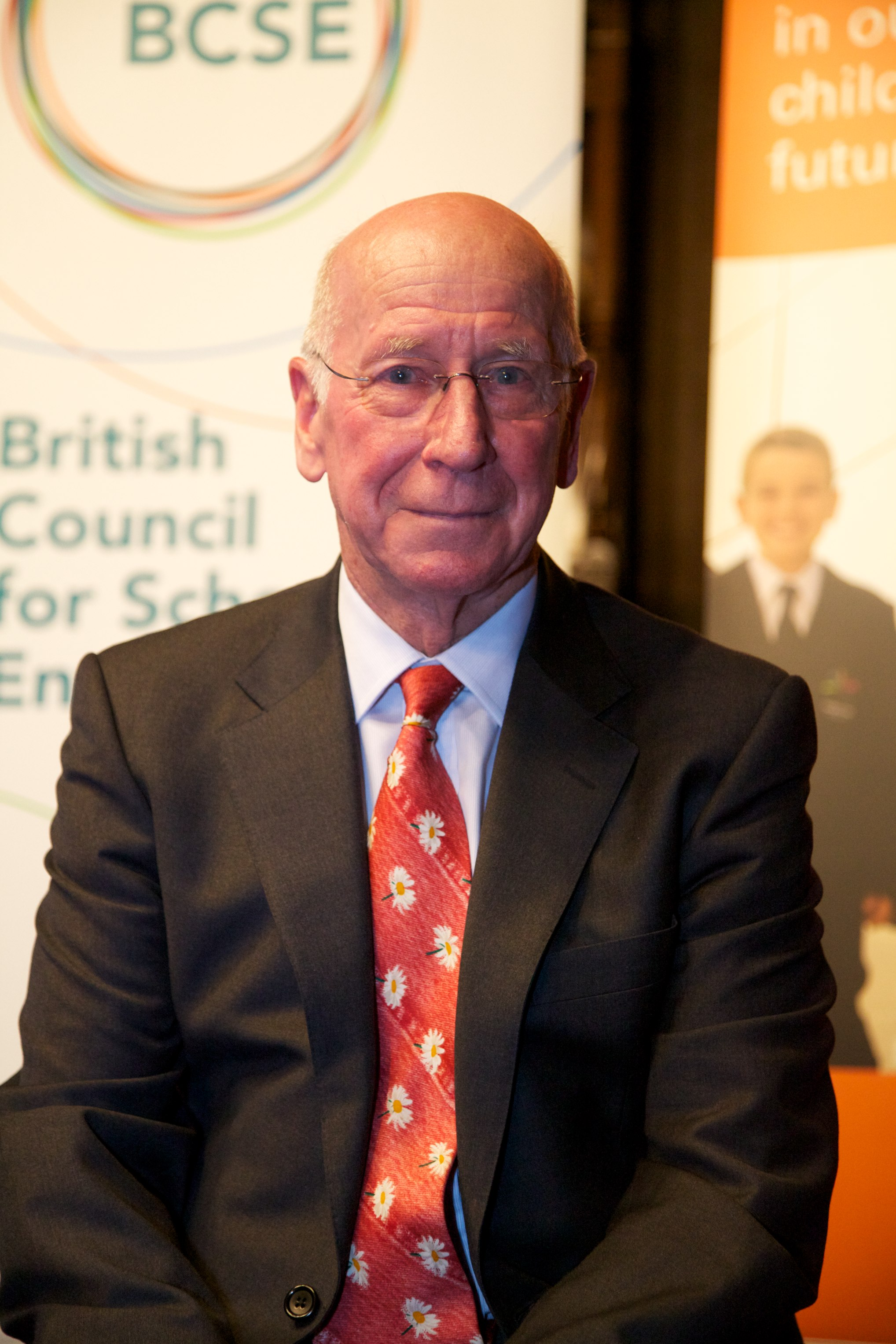
Bobby Charlton

- October 1 – Matthew Carter, English-born American type designer
- October 2 – Johnnie Cochran, African-American attorney (d. 2005)
- October 4
  - Jackie Collins, English author (d. 2015)
  - Franz Vranitzky, 19th Chancellor of Austria
- October 11 – Bobby Charlton, English footballer (d. 2023)
- October 19 – Teresa Ciepły, Polish Olympic athlete (d. 2006)
- October 20 – Wanda Jackson, American singer, songwriter, pianist and guitarist
- October 21 – Édith Scob, French film and theatre actress (d. 2019)
- October 22 – Kader Khan, Afghan-born Indian-Canadian film actor, screenwriter, comedian, and director (d. 2018)
- October 28 – Lenny Wilkens, American basketball player and coach (d. 2025)
- October 30
  - Claude Lelouch, French film director, writer, cinematographer, actor and producer.
  - Ashaari Mohammad, Malaysian spiritual leader (d. 2010)
- October 31 – Tom Paxton, American folk singer, songwriter

=== November ===
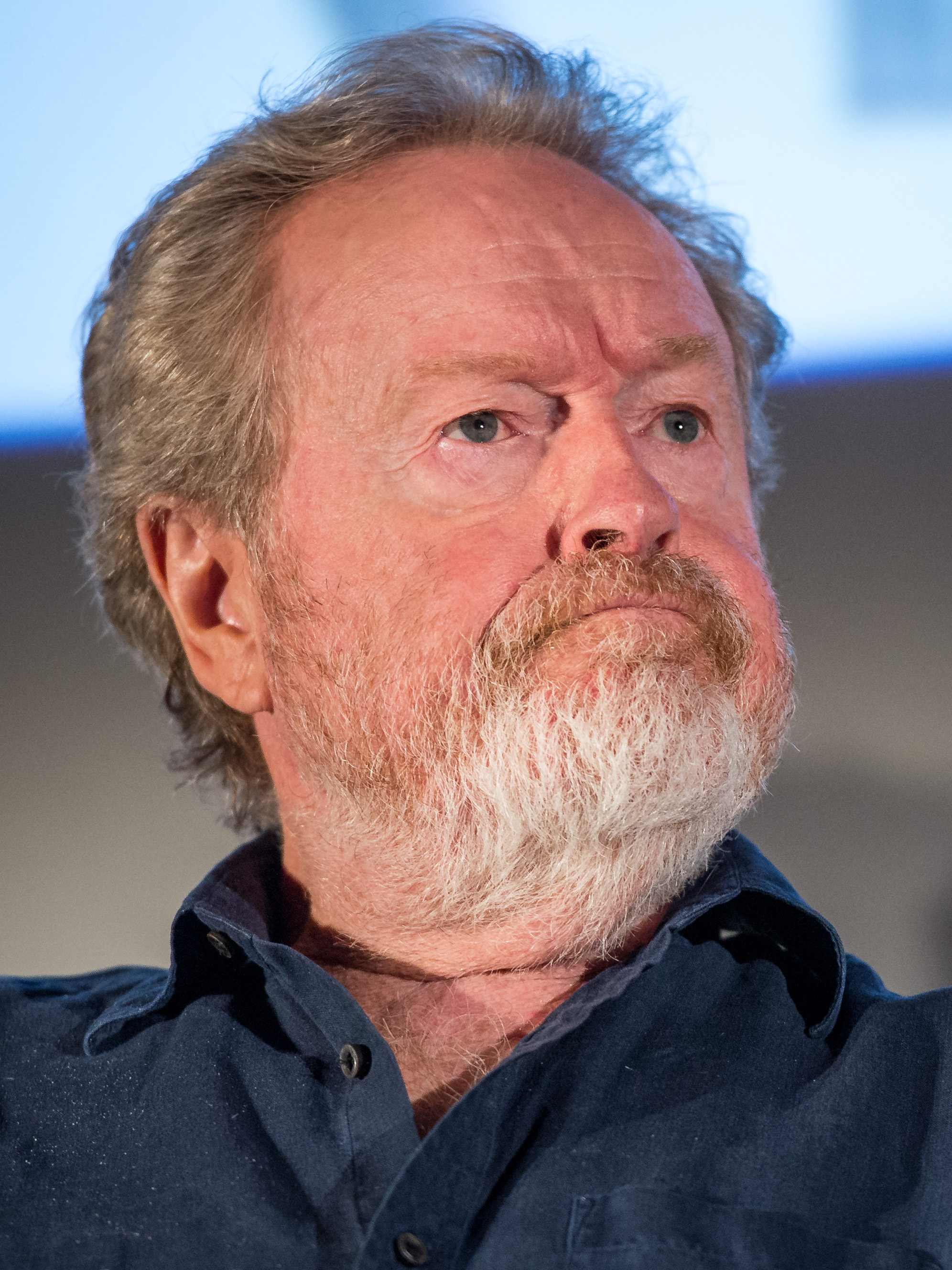
Sir Ridley Scott

- November 4 – Loretta Swit, American actress (M*A*S*H) (d. 2025)
- November 5 – Chan Sek Keong, third Chief Justice of Singapore
- November 8 – Dragoslav Šekularac, Serbian footballer and manager (d. 2019)
- November 15 – Little Willie John, African-American R&B singer (d. 1968)
- November 15 – Batuling Bantayao Gumander, Filipino politician and Moro revolutionary leader (d. 1976)
- November 17 – Peter Cook, English comedian, writer and actor (d. 1995)
- November 20 – Eero Mäntyranta, Finnish Olympic cross-country skier (d. 2013)
- November 21
  - Ingrid Pitt, Polish-born British actress (d. 2010)
  - Marlo Thomas, American actress, producer and social activist (That Girl)
  - Ferenc Kósa, Hungarian film director (d. 2018)
- November 25 – Serikbolsyn Abdildin, Kazakh economist and politician (d. 2019)
- November 26 – Boris Yegorov, Russian cosmonaut (d. 1994)
- November 30 – Ridley Scott, British film director, producer

=== December ===
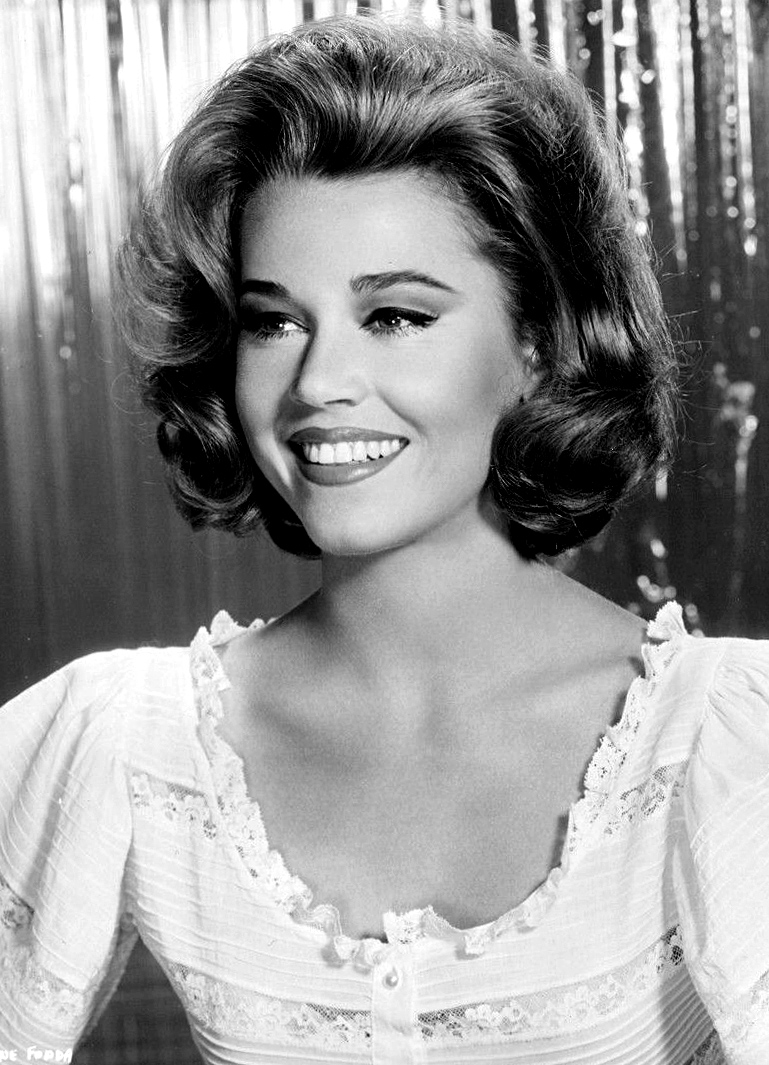
Jane Fonda

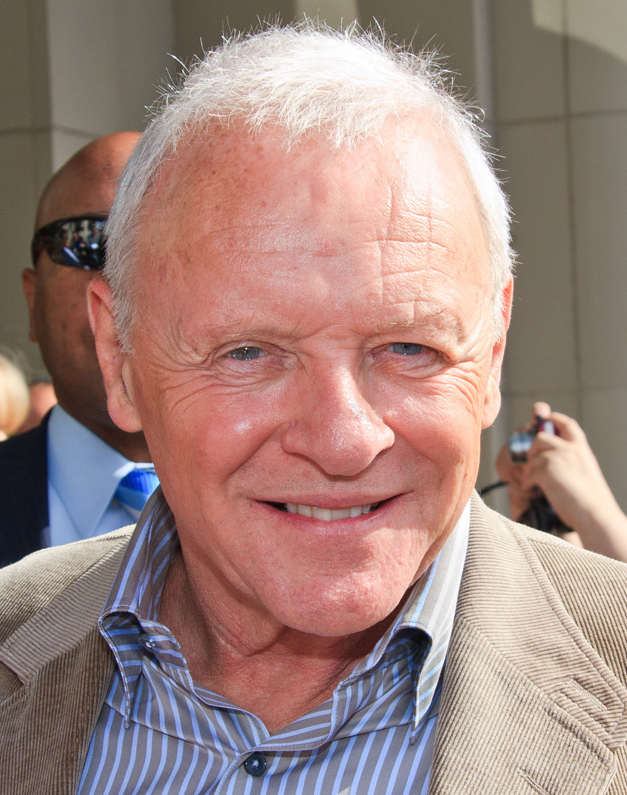
Sir Anthony Hopkins

- December 1 – Vaira Vīķe-Freiberga, President of Latvia
- December 3 – Francisco Xavier do Amaral, 1st President of East Timor (d. 2012)
- December 6 – Ramon Torrents, Spanish artist
- December 8
  - James MacArthur, American actor (d. 2010)
  - Arne Næss Jr., Norwegian mountaineer, businessman (d. 2004)
- December 12
  - Connie Francis, American singer (d. 2025)
  - Michael Jeffery, 24th Governor-General of Australia (d. 2020)
- December 17 – Sergio Jiménez, Mexican actor (d. 2007)
- December 18 – Sami-ul-Haq, Pakistani cleric, politician (d. 2018)
- December 21 – Jane Fonda, American actress and activist
- December 26 – John Horton Conway, English-born mathematician (d. 2020)
- December 28 – Ratan Tata, Indian industrialist (d. 2024)
- December 29 – Maumoon Abdul Gayoom, President of the Maldives (1978–2008)
- December 30 – Gordon Banks, English footballer (d. 2019)
- December 31
  - Avram Hershko, Israeli biologist, recipient of the Nobel Prize in Chemistry
  - Anthony Hopkins, Welsh actor
  - Milutin Šoškić, Serbian footballer (d. 2022)

== Deaths ==
=== January ===
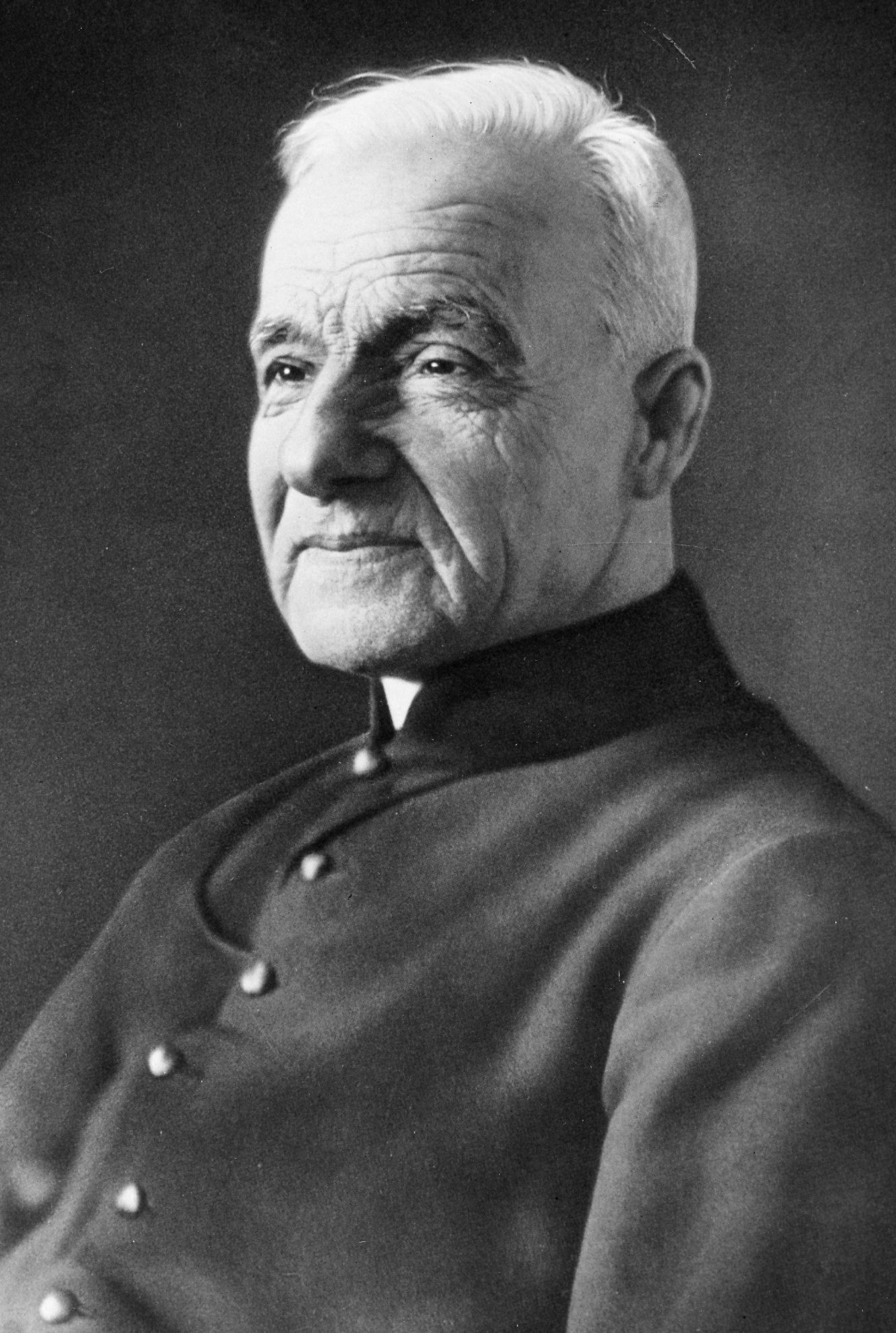
Saint André Bessette

- January 1
  - Bhaktisiddhanta Sarasvati, Indian spiritual teacher (b. 1874)
  - John Gresham Machen, American Presbyterian theologian (b. 1881)
- January 2 – Ross Alexander, American actor (b. 1907)
- January 5
  - Alberto de Oliveira, Brazilian poet (b. 1857)
  - Ernst Löfström, Finnish general of World War I (b. 1865)
- January 6
  - André Bessette, Canadian religious leader, saint (b. 1845)
  - Albert Gleaves, American admiral (b. 1858)
- January 13 – Martin Johnson, American adventurer, documentary filmmaker (plane crash) (b. 1884)
- January 15
  - Pietro Biginelli, Italian chemist (b. 1860)
  - Georges Hilaire Bousquet, French scholar (b. 1845)
- January 16 – Pyotr Bark, Soviet statesman (b. 1869)
- January 17 – Richard Boleslawski, Polish film director (b. 1889)
- January 18 – Jaime Hilario Barbal, Spanish Roman Catholic religious professed and saint (executed) (b. 1889)
- January 21
  - Yasin al-Hashimi, Iraqi politician and 4th Prime Minister of Iraq (b. 1884)
  - Marie Prevost, Canadian actress (b. 1896)
- January 23 – Orso Mario Corbino, Italian physicist, politician (b. 1876)

=== February ===
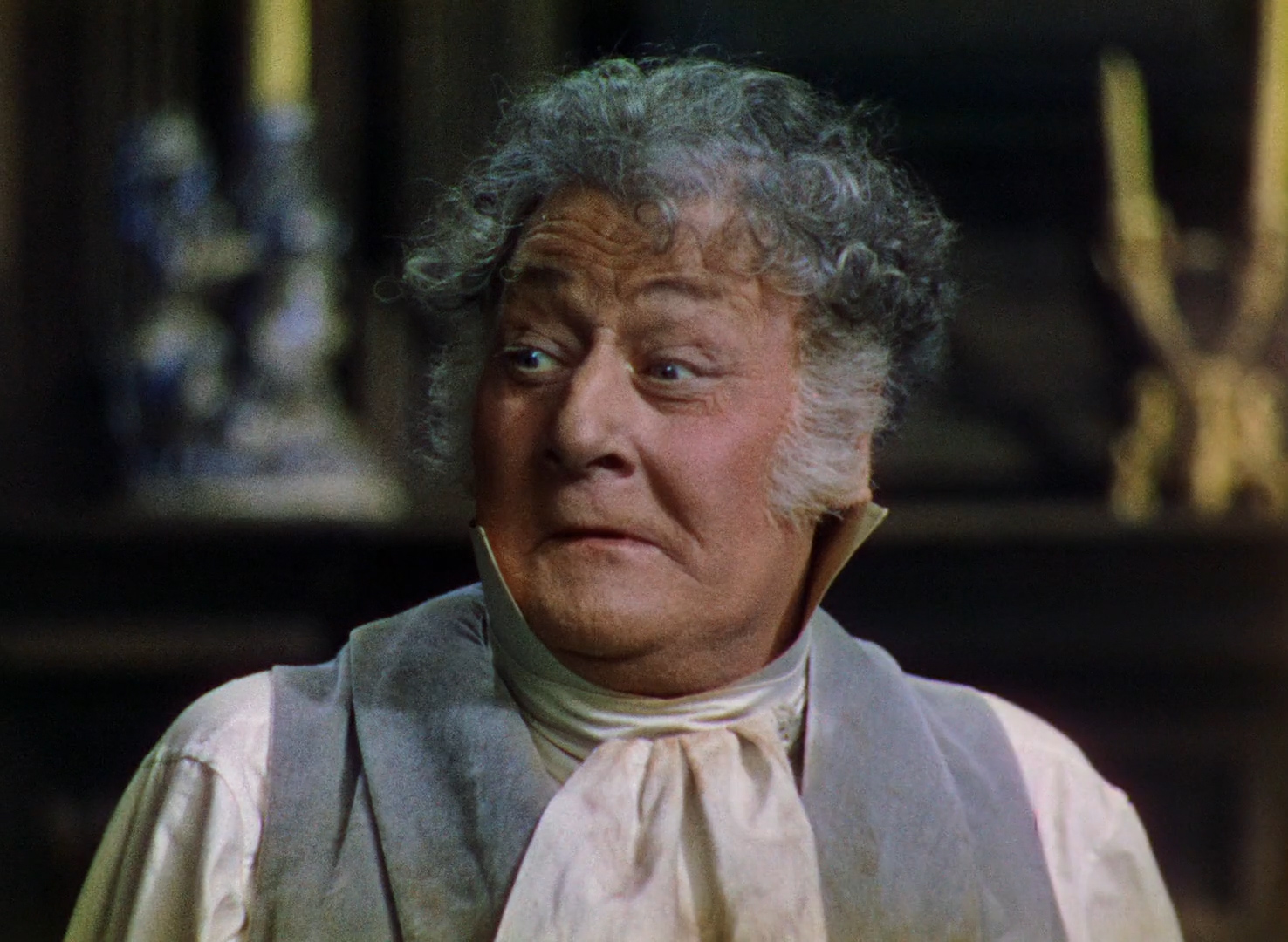
George Hassell

- February 1 – Asano Nagakoto, Japanese diplomat, politician (b. 1842)
- February 2 – Reinhold Hanisch, Austrian politician, worker (b. 1884)
- February 5
  - Lou Andreas-Salomé, Russian-born writer (b. 1861)
  - José Nicoletti Filho, Italian revolutionary hero (b. 1871)
- February 7 – Elihu Root, American statesman, diplomat and Nobel Peace Prize recipient (b. 1845)
- February 11
  - Walter Burley Griffin, American architect, town planner (b. 1876)
  - Vasily Gurko, Russian general (b. 1864)
  - Maria Luisa Josefa, Mexican Roman Catholic nun and venerable (b. 1866)
  - Peter of Jesus Maldonado, Mexican priest, martyr and saint (b. 1892)
- February 14
  - Vicente Vilar David, Spanish Roman Catholic priest, saint and martyr (killed in battle) (b. 1889)
  - Erkki Melartin, Finnish composer (b. 1875)
- February 17 – George Hassell, English actor (b. 1881)
- February 19 – Horacio Quiroga, Uruguayan writer (b. 1878)
- February 20 – Sir Percy Cox, British army general and colonial administrator (b.1864)
- February 24
  - Vladimir Lipsky, Soviet scientist, botanist (b. 1863)
  - Beyene Merid, Ethiopian military commander (b. 1897)
  - Sir Guy Standing, British actor (b. 1873)
- February 27
  - Douglas Carnegie, British politician (b. 1870)
  - Charles Donnelly, Irish poet (killed in battle) (b. 1915)

=== March ===
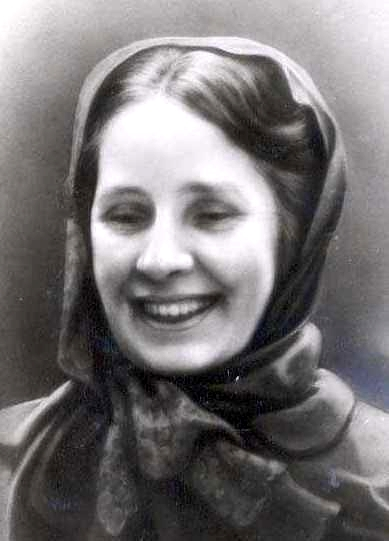
Blessed Concepcion Cabrera de Armida

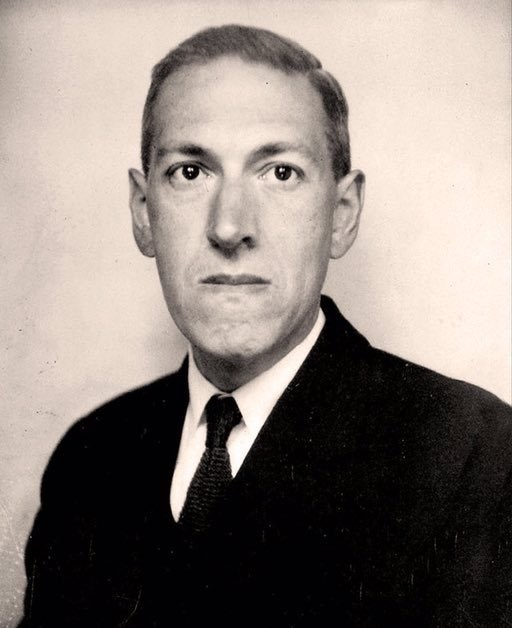
H. P. Lovecraft

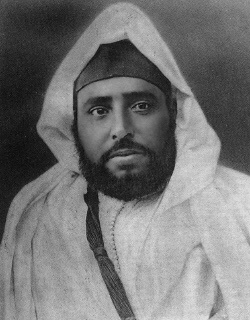
Sultan Abd al-Hafid of Morocco

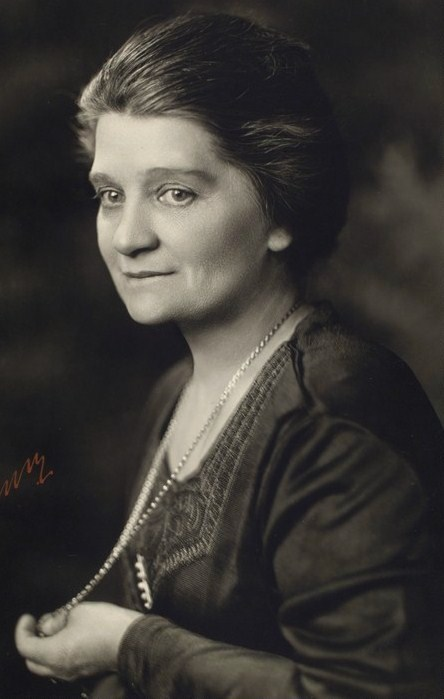
Lucy Beaumont

- March 6 – John Ellis Martineau, American politician (b. 1873)
- March 7 – Concepción Cabrera de Armida, Mexican Roman Catholic mystic and blessed (b. 1862)
- March 8
  - Yuriy Kotsiubynsky, Soviet politician, activist (b. 1896)
  - Howie Morenz, Canadian ice hockey player (b. 1902)
- March 9 – Paul Elmer More, American critic, essayist (b. 1864)
- March 11 – Joseph S. Cullinan, American oil industrialist, founder of Texaco (b. 1860)
- March 12
  - Jenő Hubay, Hungarian composer, violinist (b. 1858)
  - Charles-Marie Widor, French organist, composer (b. 1844)
- March 13 – Elihu Thomson, English-American engineer and inventor, co-founder of General Electric (b. 1853)
- March 15 – H. P. Lovecraft, American writer (b. 1890)
- March 16 – Sir Austen Chamberlain, British statesman, Nobel Peace Prize recipient (b. 1863)
- March 18
  - Mélanie Bonis, French composer (b. 1858)
  - Felix Graf von Bothmer, German general (b. 1852)
  - Julio Sanchez Gardel, Argentine dramatist (b. 1870)
- March 20
  - Arthur Bernède, French writer, poet and playwright (b. 1870)
  - Harry Vardon, English golf professional (b. 1870)
- March 22
  - Thorvald Aagaard, Danish composer (b. 1877)
  - Alfred Dyke Acland, British military officer (b. 1858)
  - Vladimir Maksimov, Soviet actor (b. 1880)
  - Mary Russell, Duchess of Bedford, British aviator, ornithologist (plane crash) (b. 1865)
- March 25 – John Drinkwater, British poet, dramatist (b. 1882)
- March 27 – Victor Gustav Bloede, Swedish chemist (b. 1849)
- March 28 – Josef Klička, Czechoslovak organist, violinist and composer (b. 1855)
- March 29
  - Fyodor Keneman, Soviet pianist, composer (b. 1873)
  - Karol Szymanowski, Polish composer (b. 1882)
  - Kim You-jeong, Korean novelist (b. 1908)
- March 31 – Ahmed Izzet Pasha, Turkish general (b. 1864)

=== April ===
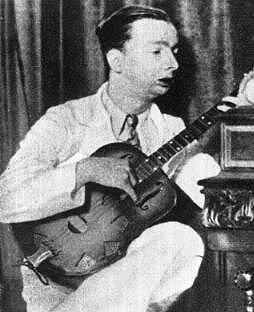
Noel Rosa

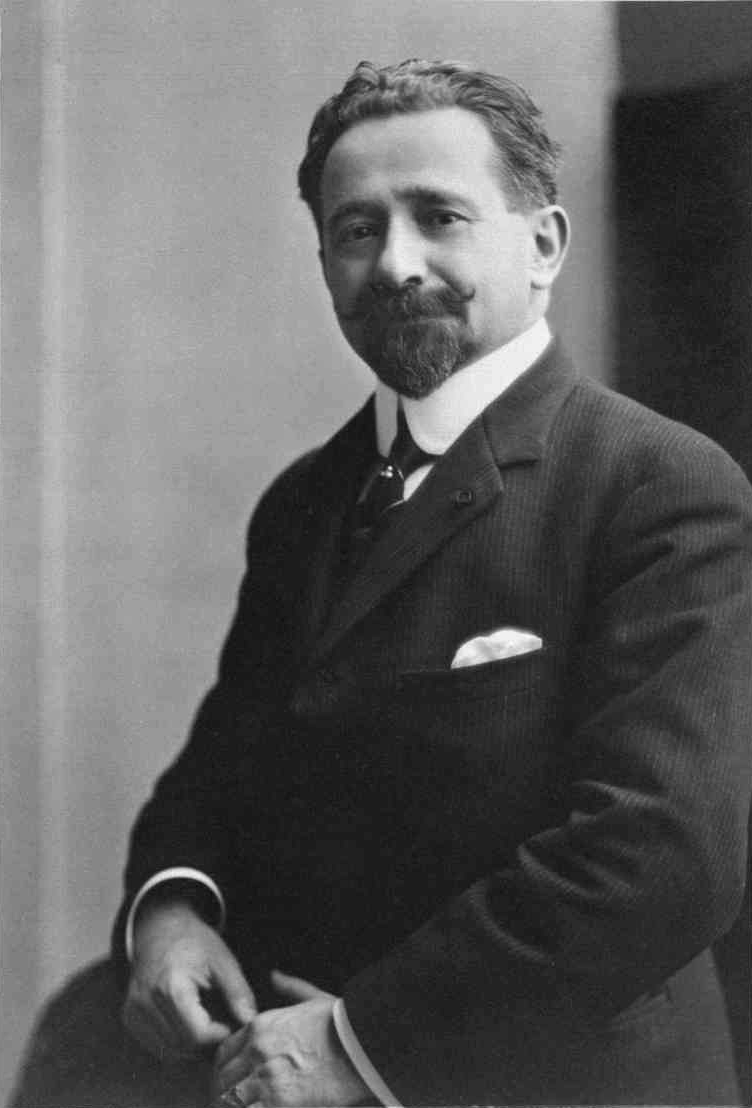
Afonso Costa

- April 2 – Nathan Birnbaum, Austrian writer, journalist (b. 1864)
- April 4
  - Sultan Abd al-Hafid of Morocco (b. 1875)
  - Maria Teresa Casini, Italian Roman Catholic nun and blessed (b. 1864)
- April 5 – Jose Benlliure y Gil, Spanish painter (b. 1858)
- April 6 – Gyula Juhász, Hungarian poet (b. 1883)
- April 7 – Helen Burgess, American actress (b. 1916)
- April 8 – Billy Bassett, English association footballer (b. 1869)
- April 10
  - Ralph Ince, American film director (b. 1887)
  - Shridhar Venkatesh Ketkar, Indian sociologist, historian (b. 1884)
- April 14 – Ned Hanlon, American baseball manager, MLB Hall of Famer (b. 1857)
- April 16 – Jay Johnson Morrow, American military engineer, politician and 3rd Governor of the Panama Canal Zone (b. 1870)
- April 18 – Max von Gallwitz, German general (b. 1852)
- April 19
  - Martin Conway, 1st Baron Conway of Allington, British art critic, mountaineer (b. 1856)
  - William Morton Wheeler, American entomologist (b. 1865)
- April 20
  - Gaston Chérau, French journalist (b. 1872)
  - Josef Mařatka, Czech sculptor (b. 1874)
- April 21 – Saima Harmaja, Finnish poet (b. 1913)
- April 22 – Arthur Edmund Carewe, Armenian-American actor (b. 1884)
- April 23 – Caroline Harris, American actress (b. 1867)
- April 24 – Lucy Beaumont, British actress (b. 1869)
- April 25 – Michał Drzymała, Polish rebel (b. 1857)
- April 27 – Antonio Gramsci, Italian Communist writer, politician (b. 1891)
- April 29
  - Wallace Carothers, American chemist, inventor of nylon (b. 1896)
  - William Gillette, American actor (b. 1853)

=== May ===
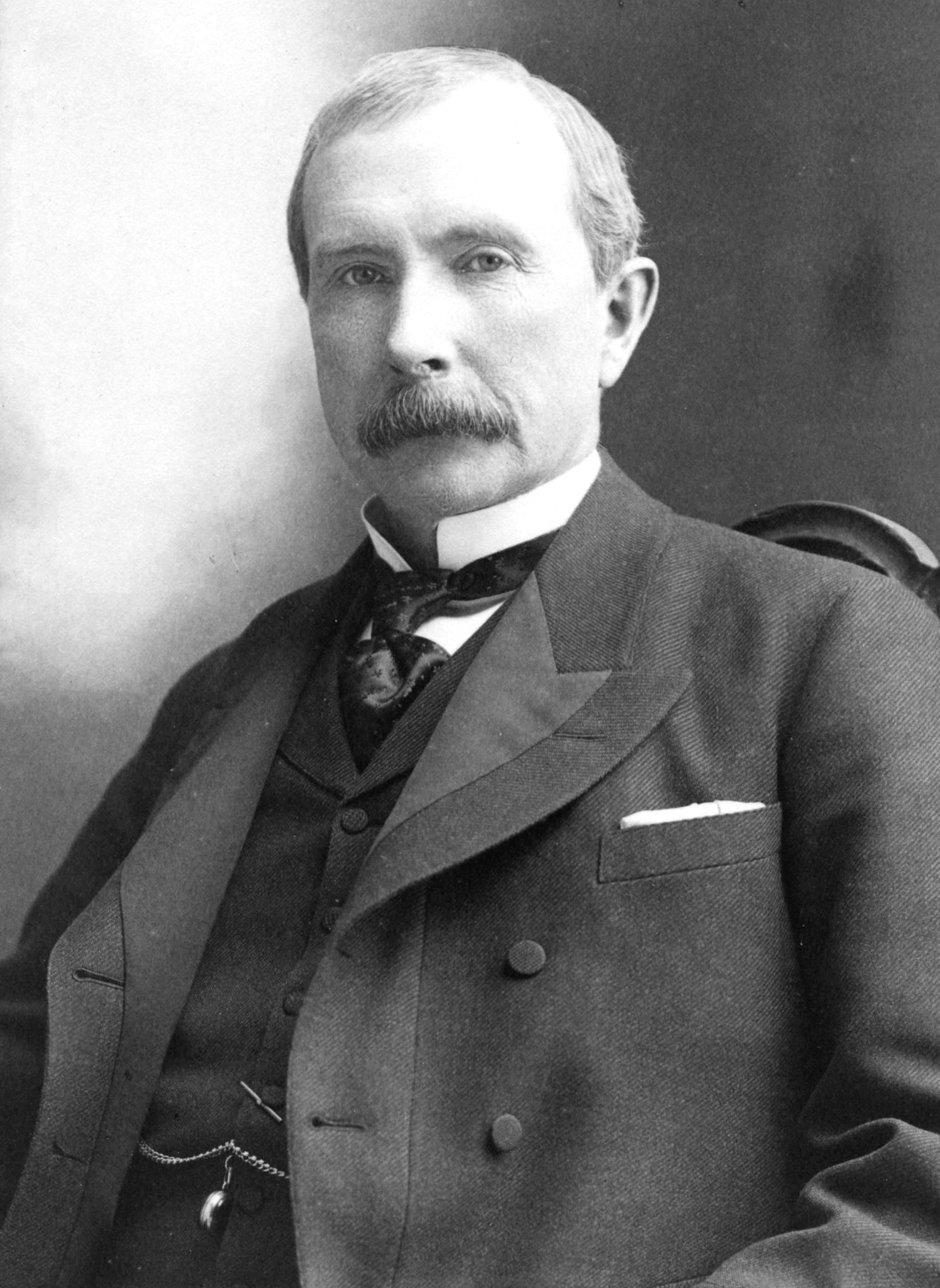
John D. Rockefeller

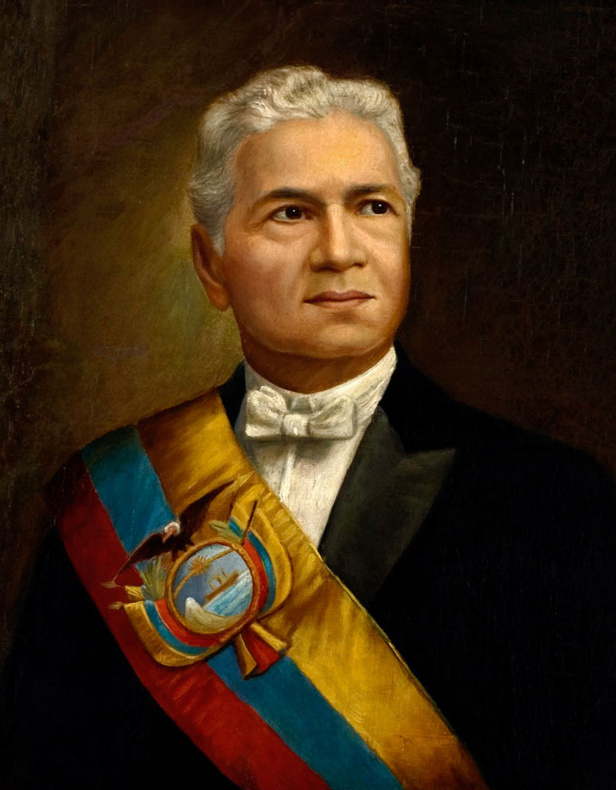
Lizardo García

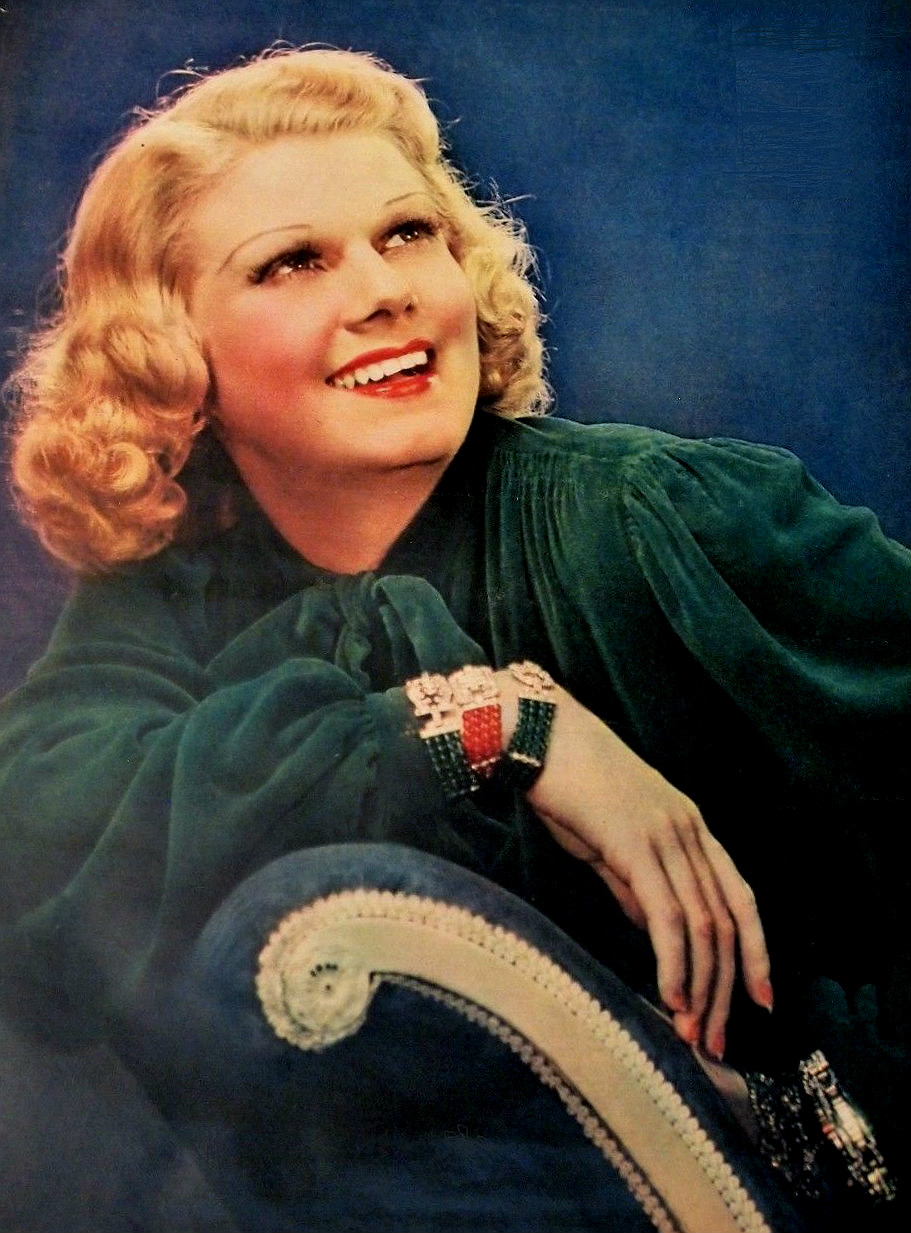
Jean Harlow

- May 1
  - Snitz Edwards, Hungarian actor (b. 1868)
  - Herbert Hughes, Irish composer (b. 1882)
- May 2 – Takuji Iwasaki, Japanese meteorologist (b. 1869)
- May 5
  - Camillo Berneri, Italian philosopher, anarchist (b. 1897)
  - C.K.G. Billings, American horseman (b. 1861)
- May 7 – Ernst A. Lehmann, German captain of the Hindenburg (b. 1886)
- May 9
  - Harry Barton, American architect (b. 1876)
  - Maurice Conner, Canadian politician (b. 1868)
- May 10 – Sir James Blindell, British politician (b. 1884)
- May 11
  - Afonso Costa, Portuguese lawyer, professor, politician and 3-time Prime Minister of Portugal (b. 1871)
  - Ellen Hansell, American tennis champion (b. 1869)
- May 15 – Percy Lee Gassaway, American politician (b. 1885)
- May 23 – John D. Rockefeller, American industrialist, philanthropist (b. 1839)
- May 24
  - Luis F. Álvarez, Spanish physician (b. 1853)
  - Francis Bird, Australian architect (b. 1845)
- May 25 – Henry Ossawa Tanner, American artist (b. 1859)
- May 26 – Bertha May Crawford, Canadian opera singer (b. 1886)
- May 28 – Alfred Adler, Austrian psychologist (b. 1870)
- May 29 – Lizardo García, 17th President of Ecuador (b. 1844)

=== June ===
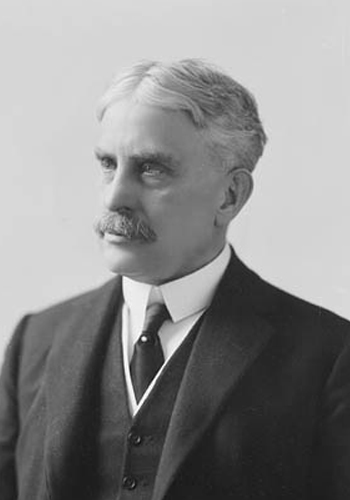
Robert Laird Borden

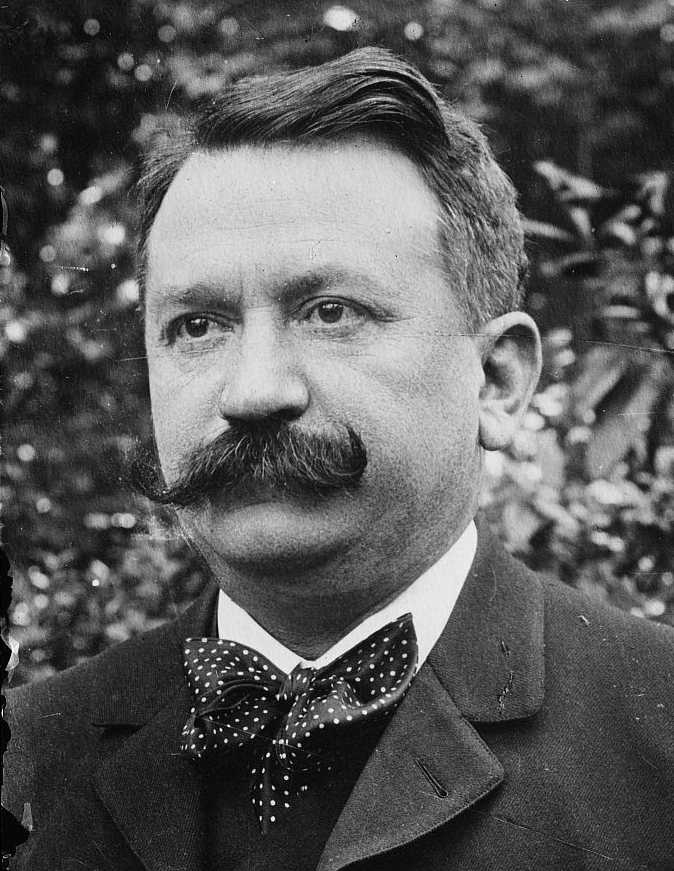
Gaston Doumergue

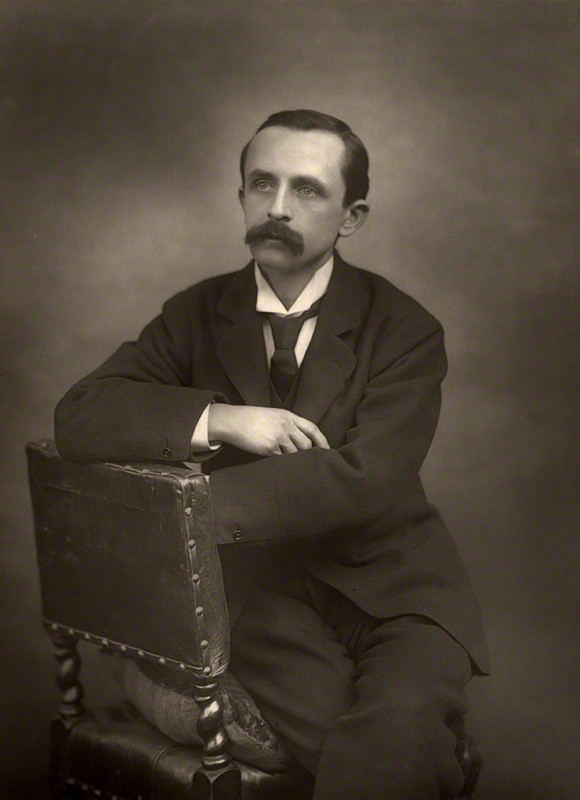
J. M. Barrie

- June 2 – Louis Vierne, French composer (b. 1870)
- June 3 – Emilio Mola, Spanish Nationalist commander (plane crash) (b. 1887)
- June 4
  - Fernand Cabrol, French theologian (b. 1855)
  - Keke Geladze, mother of Joseph Stalin, Leader of the Soviet Union (b. 1858)
- June 7 – Jean Harlow, American actress (b. 1911)
- June 10
  - Jane Foss Barff, American activist (b. 1863)
  - Sir Robert Borden, Canadian lawyer, politician and 8th Prime Minister of Canada (b. 1854)
  - Malcolm Williams, American actor (b. 1870)
- June 12 – Mikhail Tukhachevsky, Soviet Army officer, Red Army commander-in-chief and military theoretician (executed) (b. 1893)
- June 16 – Alexander Chervyakov, Leader of the Soviet Union (b. 1892)
- June 18
  - Pierre Bodard, French painter (b. 1881)
  - Gaston Doumergue, 60th Prime Minister of France, 13th President of France (b. 1863)
- June 19 – J. M. Barrie, British novelist, dramatist (b. 1860)
- June 20 – Andreu Nin Pérez, Spanish politician (b. 1892)
- June 22 – Jean-Joseph Rabearivelo, Malagasy poet (b. 1901)
- June 25
  - Colin Clive, British actor (b. 1900)
  - Marta Cunningham, American opera singer (b. 1869)
- June 26 – Minoru Murata, Japanese actor, director and screenwriter (b. 1894)
- June 27 – Sandro Akhmeteli, Soviet director (b. 1866)
- June 28 – Max Adler, Austrian Marxist theorist (b. 1873)

=== July ===
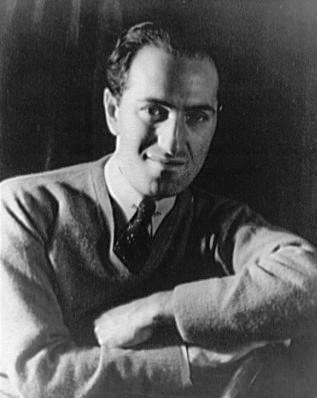
George Gershwin

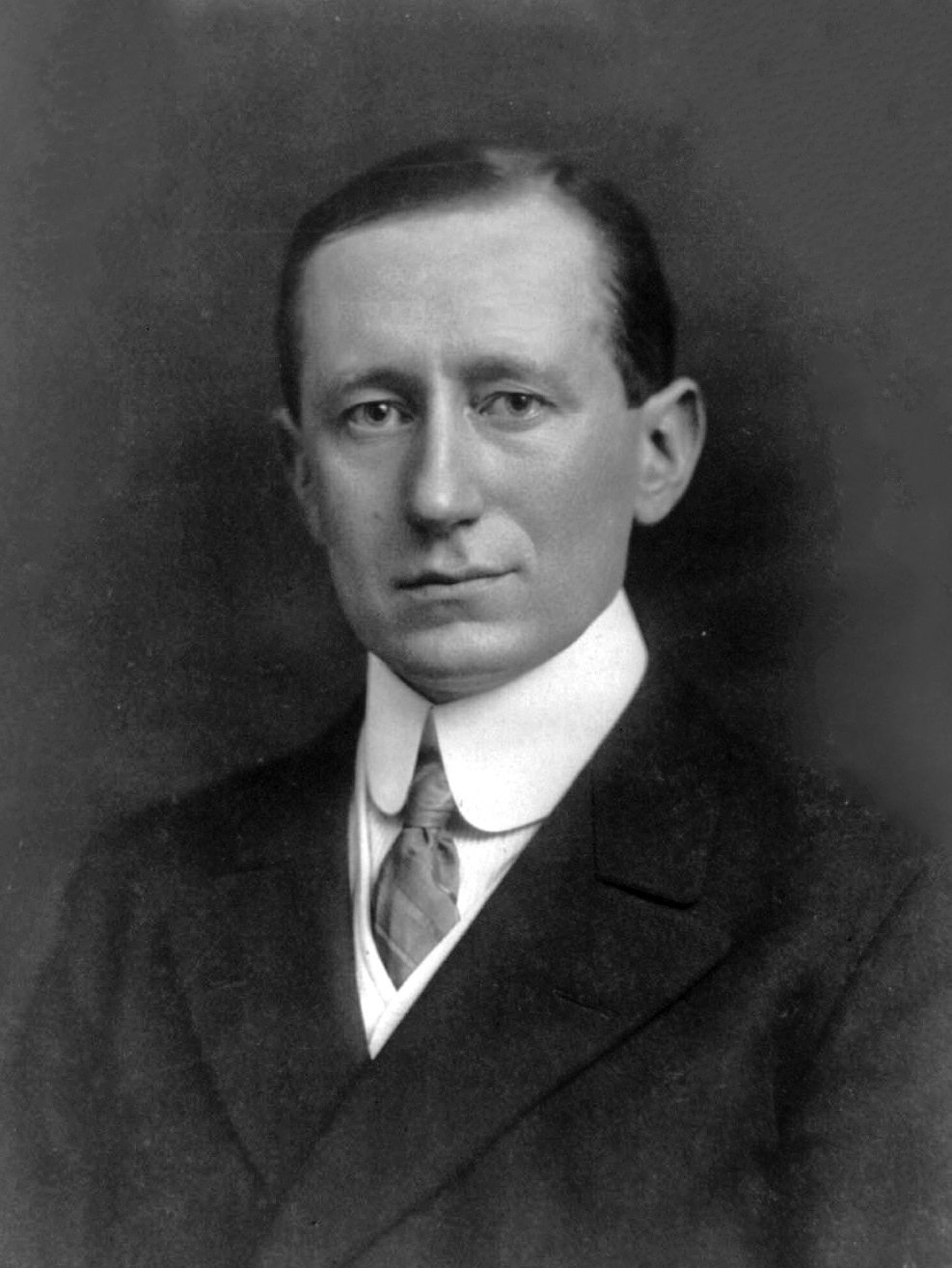
Guglielmo Marconi

Reverend Nazzareno Formosa

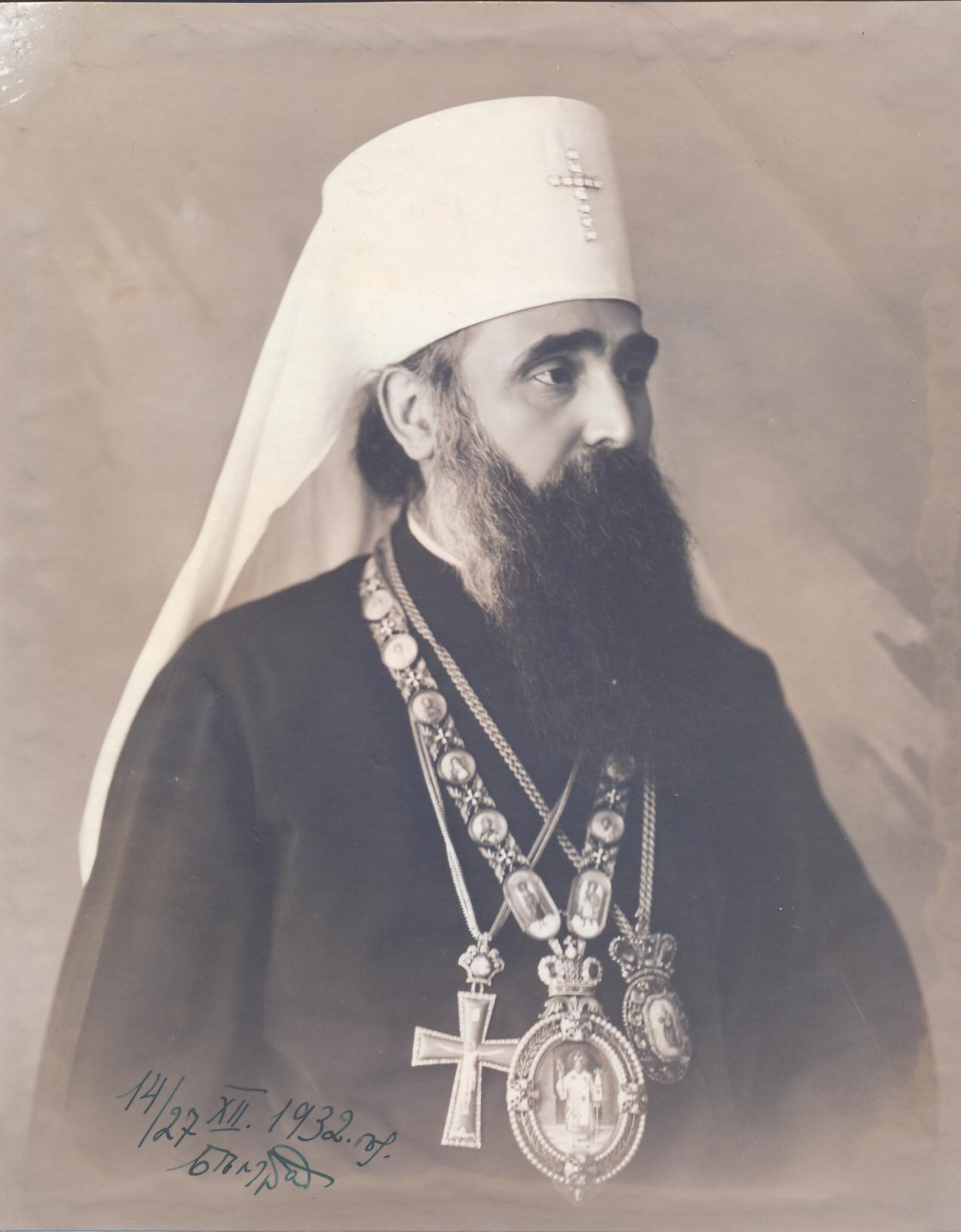
Varnava, Serbian Patriarch

- July 1
  - Ilya Garkavyi, Soviet general (b. 1888)
  - Matvei Vasilenko, Soviet komkor (b. 1888)
- July 2 – Amelia Earhart, American aviator (missing on this date) (b. 1897)
- July 3 – Boris Gorbachyov, Soviet general (b. 1892)
- July 6
  - Bohdan Ihor Antonych, Soviet poet (b. 1909)
  - Ernesto Badini, Italian opera singer (b. 1876)
- July 7 – Åke Hammarskjöld, Swedish diplomat, lawyer (b. 1893)
- July 8 – Diana Abgar, Armenian diplomat (b. 1859)
- July 9 – Oliver Law, American labor organizer, Army officer (killed in Spanish Civil War) (b. 1899)
- July 10 – Arthur Edmund Seaman, American professor and museum curator (b. 1858)
- July 11
  - George Gershwin, American composer (b. 1898)
  - Rodrigues Ottolengui, American writer (b. 1861)
- July 12 – Hugo Charteris, 11th Earl of Wemyss, British politician, public servant (b. 1857)
- July 13
  - Mykhailo Boychuk, Soviet painter (b. 1882)
  - Victor Laloux, French architect (b. 1850)
- July 14
  - Julius Meier, American businessman, politician (b. 1874)
  - Joseph Taylor Robinson, American politician (b. 1872)
- July 15 – Walter Gay, American painter (b. 1856)
- July 16
  - Vladimir Kirillov, Soviet poet (b. 1889)
  - Kanichiro Tashiro, Japanese general (b. 1881)
- July 17
  - Annie Furuhjelm, Finnish feminist activist, politician (b. 1859)
  - Percy Gardner, British archaeologist (b. 1846)
- July 18
  - Julian Bell, British poet (killed in Spanish Civil War) (b. 1908)
  - Grigol Giorgadze, Soviet historian, jurist and politician (b. 1879)
- July 20 – Guglielmo Marconi, Italian-born American inventor (b. 1874)
- July 22
  - Nazzareno Formosa, American Roman Catholic priest and reverend (b. 1901)
  - Paolo Iashvili, Soviet poet (b. 1894)
- July 23 – Varnava, Serbian Patriarch (b. 1880)
- July 31 – Noë Bloch, Soviet producer (b. 1875)

=== August ===
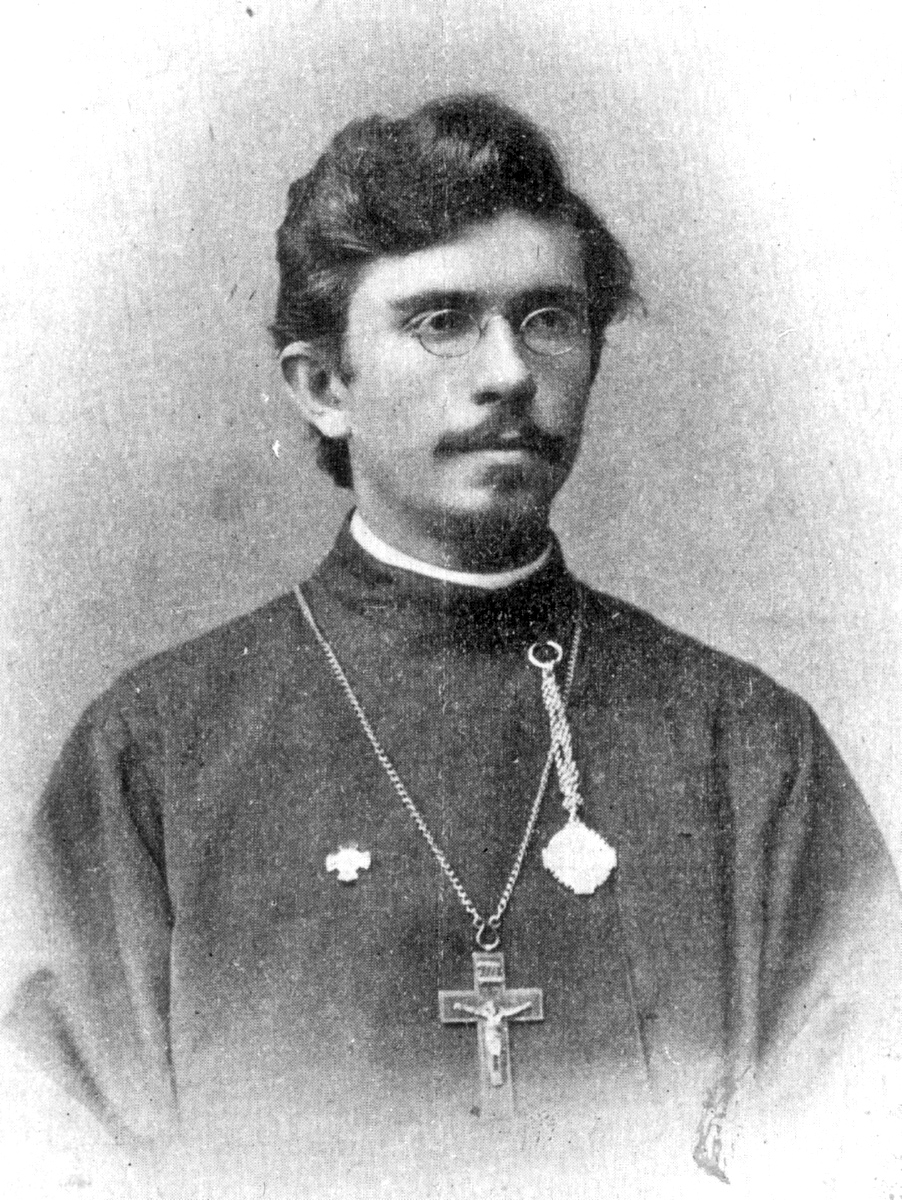
Saint Alexander Hotovitzky

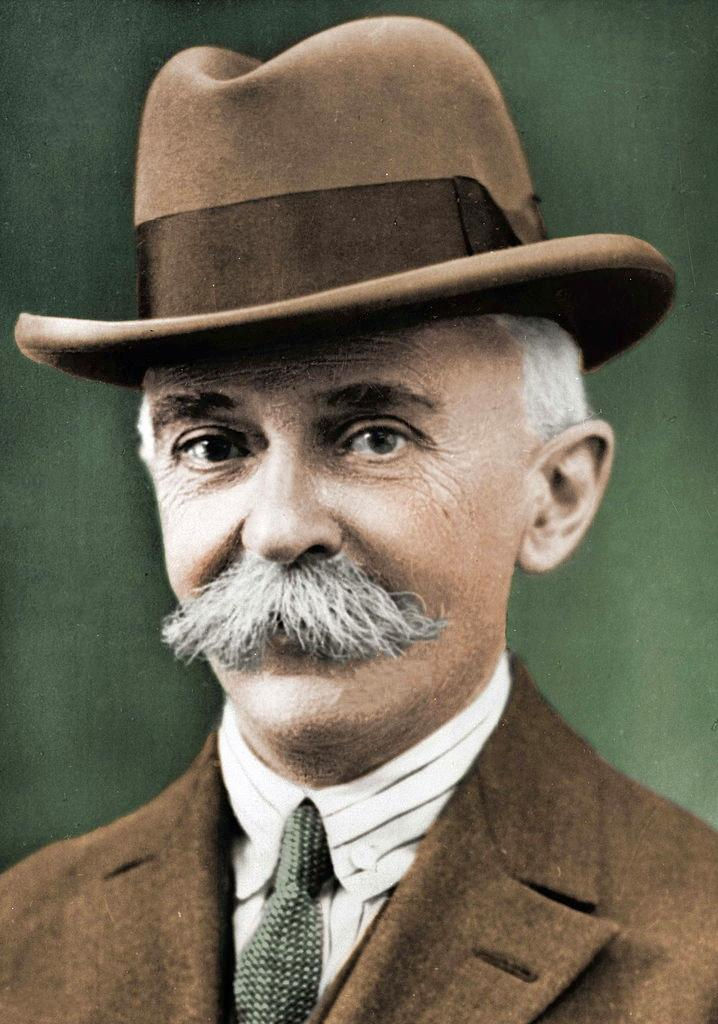
Pierre de Coubertin

- August 5 – Jean Louis Conneau, French aviator (b. 1880)
- August 6
  - Adeodato Barreto, Portuguese poet (b. 1905)
  - F. C. S. Schiller, German-British philosopher (b. 1864)
- August 8 – Martin Rázus, Slovak poet, writer and politician (b. 1888)
- August 9 – Na Woon-gyu, Korean actor, director and screenwriter (b. 1902)
- August 11 – Edith Wharton, American writer (b. 1862)
- August 13 – Sigizmund Levanevsky, Soviet aircraft pilot (b. 1902)
- August 19
  - Alexander Hotovitzky, Russian Orthodox priest, missionary and saint (b. 1872)
  - Asaichi Isobe, Japanese army officer (b. 1905)
  - Ivan Kataev, Russian novelist, writer (b. 1902)
- August 22
  - Owen Burns, American entrepreneur (b. 1869)
  - Gelegdorjiin Demid, Russian political military figure (b. 1900)
- August 24 – Gervase Beckett, British politician (b. 1866)
- August 26
  - Christos Christovasilis, Greek journalist, author (b. 1861)
  - Andrew Mellon, American banker, U.S. Secretary of the Treasury (b. 1855)
- August 30
  - Gaetano Bisleti, Italian cardinal (b. 1856)
  - Tomás António Garcia Rosado, Portuguese general (b. 1854)
- August 31 – Ruth Baldwin, British socialite (b. 1905)

=== September ===
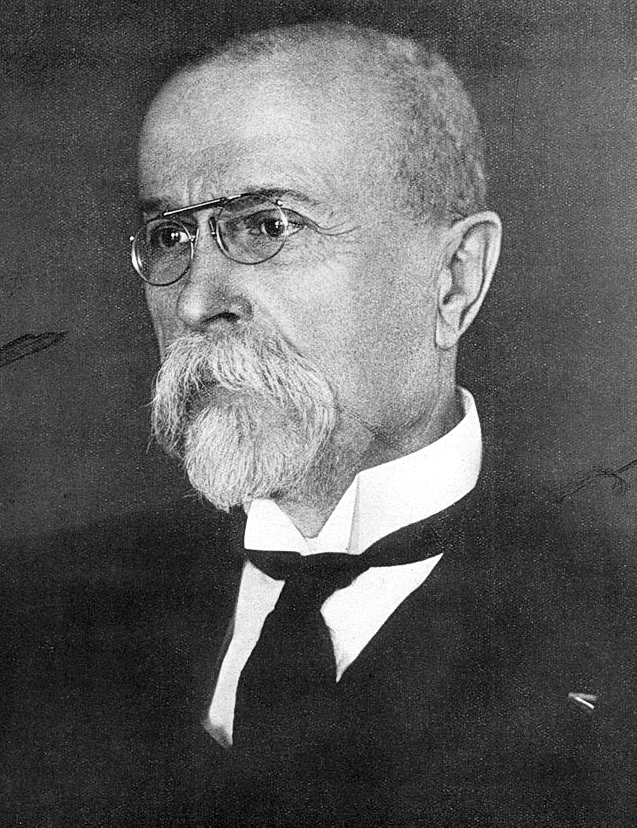
Tomáš Garrigue Masaryk

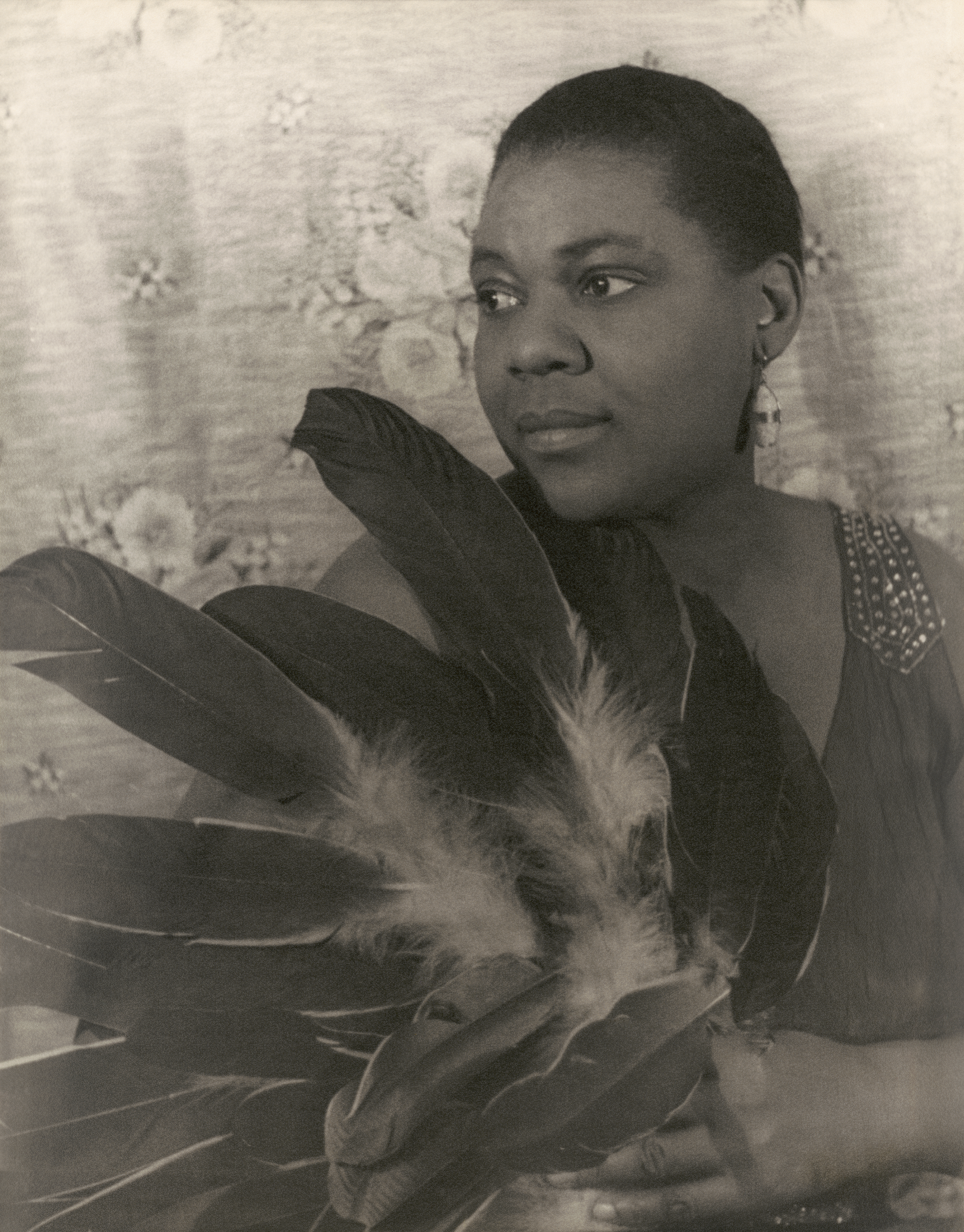
Bessie Smith

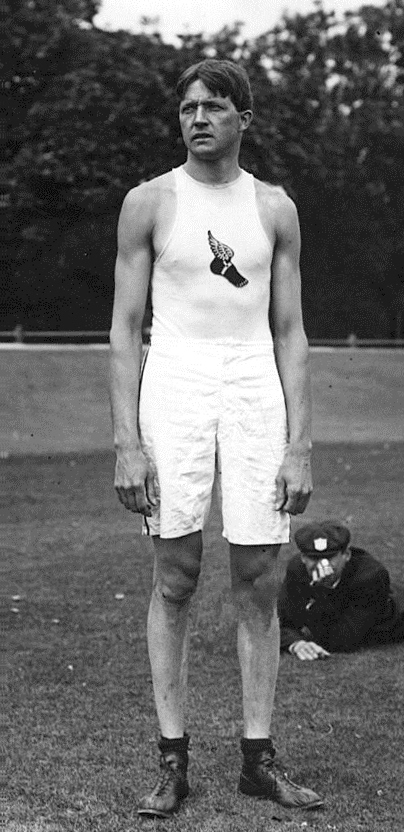
Ray Ewry

- September 2
  - Virendranath Chattopadhyaya, Indian revolutionary hero (b. 1880)
  - Pierre de Coubertin, 2nd President of the International Olympic Committee (b. 1863)
- September 3 – François Guiguet, French painter (b. 1860)
- September 4
  - Daniel Alexander Cameron, Canadian politician (b. 1870)
  - Juan Campisteguy, Uruguayan lawyer, soldier and 25th President of Uruguay (b. 1859)
- September 5 – David Hendricks Bergey, American bacteriologist (b. 1860)
- September 6 – Harry Charles Purvis Bell, British civil servant, commissioner (b. 1851)
- September 8 – Frank Alexander, American actor (b. 1879)
- September 9
  - Mikhail Diterikhs, Russian general (b. 1874)
  - Géza Horváth, Hungarian doctor, entomologist (b. 1847)
- September 11 – Nazmi Ziya Güran, Turkish painter (b. 1881)
- September 13 – Ellis Parker Butler, American humorist (b. 1869)
- September 14 – Tomáš Garrigue Masaryk, Czechoslovak politician, sociologist, philosopher and 1st President of Czechoslovakia (b. 1850)
- September 15
  - Anders Bundgaard, Danish sculptor (b. 1864)
  - Clifford Heatherley, British actor (b. 1888)
- September 20
  - Maksymilian Horwitz, Polish socialist, communist activist (b. 1877)
  - Lev Karakhan, Soviet revolutionary hero, diplomat (b. 1889)
- September 23 – Cleto González Víquez, 18th and 26th President of Costa Rica (b. 1858)
- September 22 – Ruth Roland, American actress (b. 1892)
- September 26
  - Bessie Smith, African-American blues singer (b. 1894)
  - Edward Filene, American businessman, philanthropist (b. 1860)
- September 27 – Alikhan Bukeikhanov, Kazakh statesman, politician, publicist, teacher, writer and Prime Minister of Alash Autonomy (b. 1866)
- September 29 – Ray Ewry, American Olympic athlete (b. 1873)

=== October ===
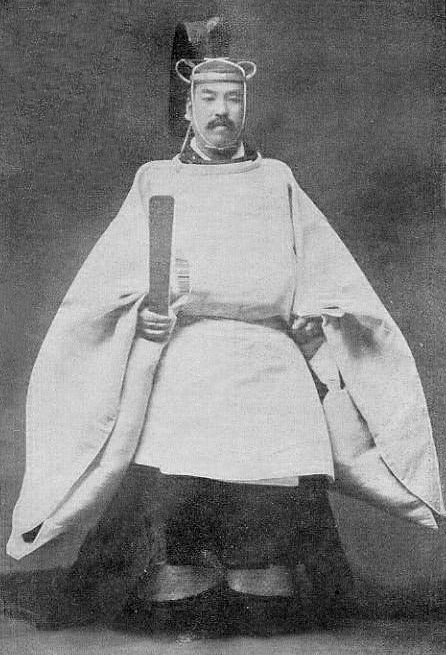
Prince Kuni Taka

Metropolitan Peter of Krutitsy

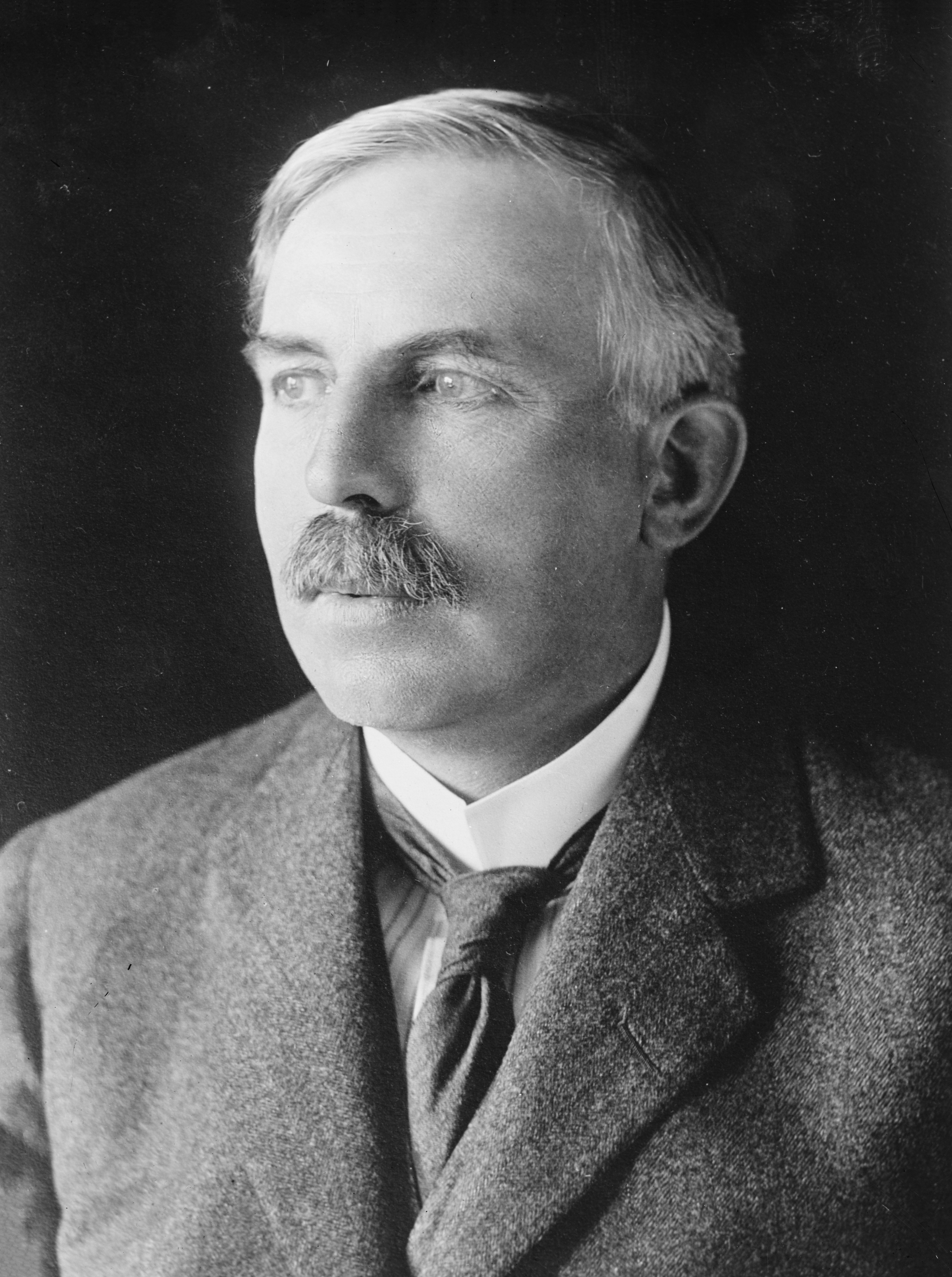
Ernest Rutherford

- October 1 – Prince Kuni Taka of Japan (b. 1875)
- October 2 – Granville Ryrie, Australian Army general, politician, and diplomat (b. 1865)
- October 3
  - Baden Baden-Powell, American aviator pioneer (b. 1860)
  - Richard Hertwig, German zoologist (b. 1850)
- October 6 – Angelo Musco, Italian actor (b. 1872)
- October 8 – Nisar Muhammad Yousafzai, Afghan revolutionary war hero (b. 1897)
- October 9
  - August de Boeck, Flemish composer (b. 1865)
  - Ernest Louis, Grand Duke of Hesse, German prince (b. 1868)
- October 10 – Peter of Krutitsy, Soviet Orthodox priest, martyr and metropolitan (b. 1862)
- October 11 – Emma E. Bower, American physician, club-woman, and newspaperwoman (b. 1852)
- October 13 – Kazimierz Nowak, Polish traveller (b. 1897)
- October 14
  - Agustín de Luque y Coca, Spanish general and politician (b. 1850)
  - Salvatore Micalizzi, Italian Roman Catholic priest and venerable (b. 1856)
- October 15 – James Marcus, American actor (b. 1867)
- October 16
  - Jean de Brunhoff, French writer (b. 1899)
  - William Sealy Gosset, English chemist and statistician (b. 1876)
- October 17
  - J. Bruce Ismay, English businessman (b. 1862)
  - Antônio Parreiras, Brazilian painter, illustrator (b. 1860)
- October 19
  - Pedro Chutró, Argentine physician (b. 1880)
  - Ernest Rutherford, New Zealand physicist, Nobel Prize in Chemistry recipient (b. 1871)
- October 23 – Nikolai Klyuev, Russian poet (b. 1884)
- October 26 – Józef Dowbor-Muśnicki, Polish general (b. 1867)
- October 27
  - Joseph-Félix Bouchor, French painter (b. 1853)
  - Abdul Karim Khan, Indian classical singer (b. 1872)
- October 29 – Kazimierz Cichowski, Polish-born Soviet politician (b. 1887)
- October 30
  - Mendel Khatayevich, Soviet politician (b. 1893)
  - Ivan Zhukov, Soviet politician (b. 1889)

=== November ===
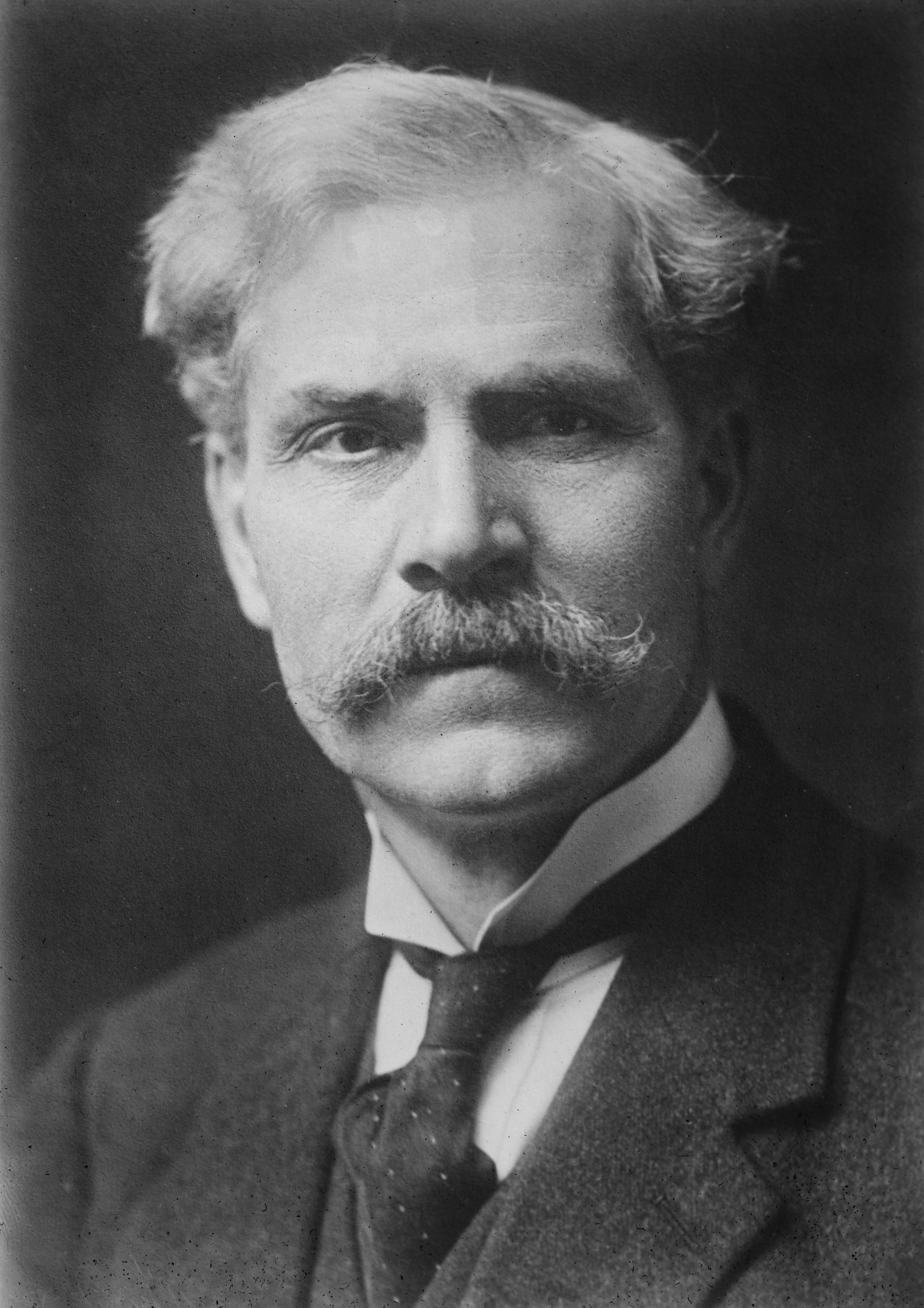
Ramsay MacDonald

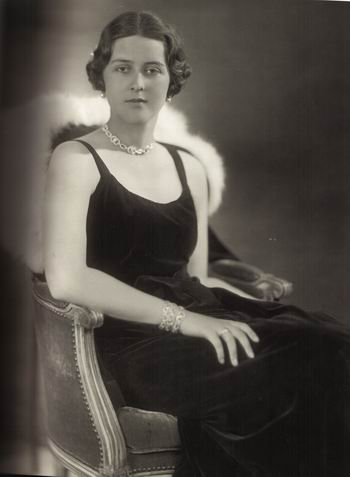
Princess Cecilie

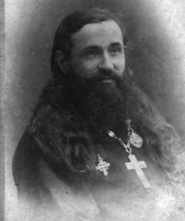
Saint Aleksandr Glagolev

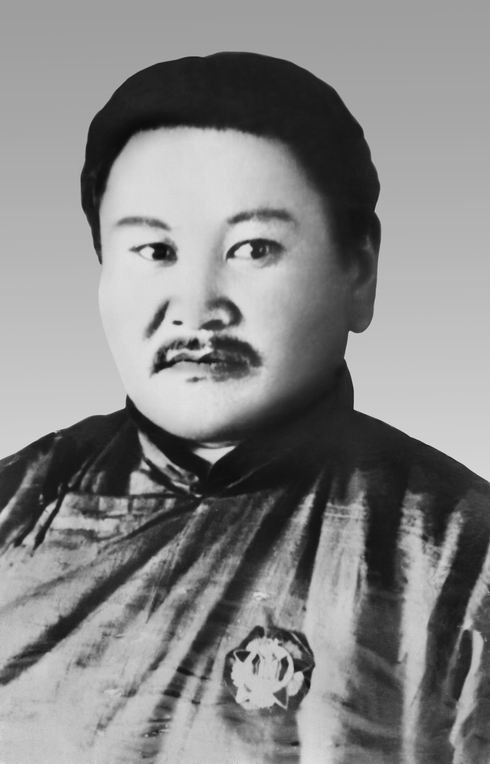
Peljidiin Genden

- November 1 – Ivar Bauck, Norwegian general (b. 1863)
- November 2 – Félix Gaffiot, French philologist (b. 1870)
- November 4
  - William Bennett, British politician (b. 1873)
  - Alfred Walter Campbell, Australian neurologist (b. 1868)
  - Gustav Gärtner, Austrian pathologist (b. 1855)
  - Emil Hassler, Swiss physician, botanist (b. 1864)
- November 5 – Naoe Kinoshita, Japanese Christian socialist (b. 1869)
- November 6 – Sir Johnston Forbes-Robertson, British stage actor (b. 1853)
- November 7 – Manuel Macías y Casado, Spanish general (b. 1844)
- November 8
  - Francis de Croisset, Belgian-born French playwright (b. 1877)
  - Victor-Constant Michel, French general (b. 1850)
- November 9 – Ramsay MacDonald, British statesman, 2-time Prime Minister of the United Kingdom (b. 1866)
- November 10 – Nikolai Batalov, Soviet actor (b. 1899)
- November 11 – Uryū Sotokichi, Japanese admiral (b. 1857)
- November 13 – Mrs. Leslie Carter, American actress (b. 1857)
- November 15 – Eero Järnefelt, Finnish realist painter (b. 1863)
- November 16
  - Némèse Garneau, Canadian politician (b. 1847)
  - Princess Cecilie of Greece and Denmark, wife of Hereditary Grand Duke Georg Donatus of Hesse, and sister of Prince Philip, Duke of Edinburgh (b. 1911)
- November 17 – Jack Worrall, Australian cricketer, coach (b. 1860)
- November 20 – Metropolitan Joseph (Petrovykh) of the Soviet Union (b. 1872)
- November 23
  - Miklós Kovács, Hungarian-born Yugoslav poet (b. 1857)
  - Jagadish Chandra Bose, Indian physicist (b. 1858)
  - George Albert Boulenger, Belgian naturalist (b. 1858)
- November 25
  - Aleksandr Glagolev, Russian Orthodox priest, religious philosopher and saint (b. 1872)
  - Alessandro Padoa, Italian mathematician (b. 1868)
  - Raymond Stanton Patton, American admiral, engineer and second Director of the United States Coast and Geodetic Survey (b. 1882)
- November 26 – Peljidiin Genden, Mongolian political figure, 9th Prime Minister of Mongolia and 2nd President of Mongolia (b. 1892)
- November 27
  - Vsevolod Balitsky, Leader of the Soviet Union (b. 1892)
  - Eero Haapalainen, Finnish Communist leader, activist (b. 1880)
  - Felix Hamrin, 22nd Prime Minister of Sweden (b. 1875)
  - Vasyl Lypkivsky, Soviet Orthodox priest, metropolitan (b. 1864)
  - Wilhelm Weinberg, German physician (b. 1862)
- November 28 – Magnús Guðmundsson, Icelandic politician, 3rd Prime Minister of Iceland (b. 1879)

=== December ===
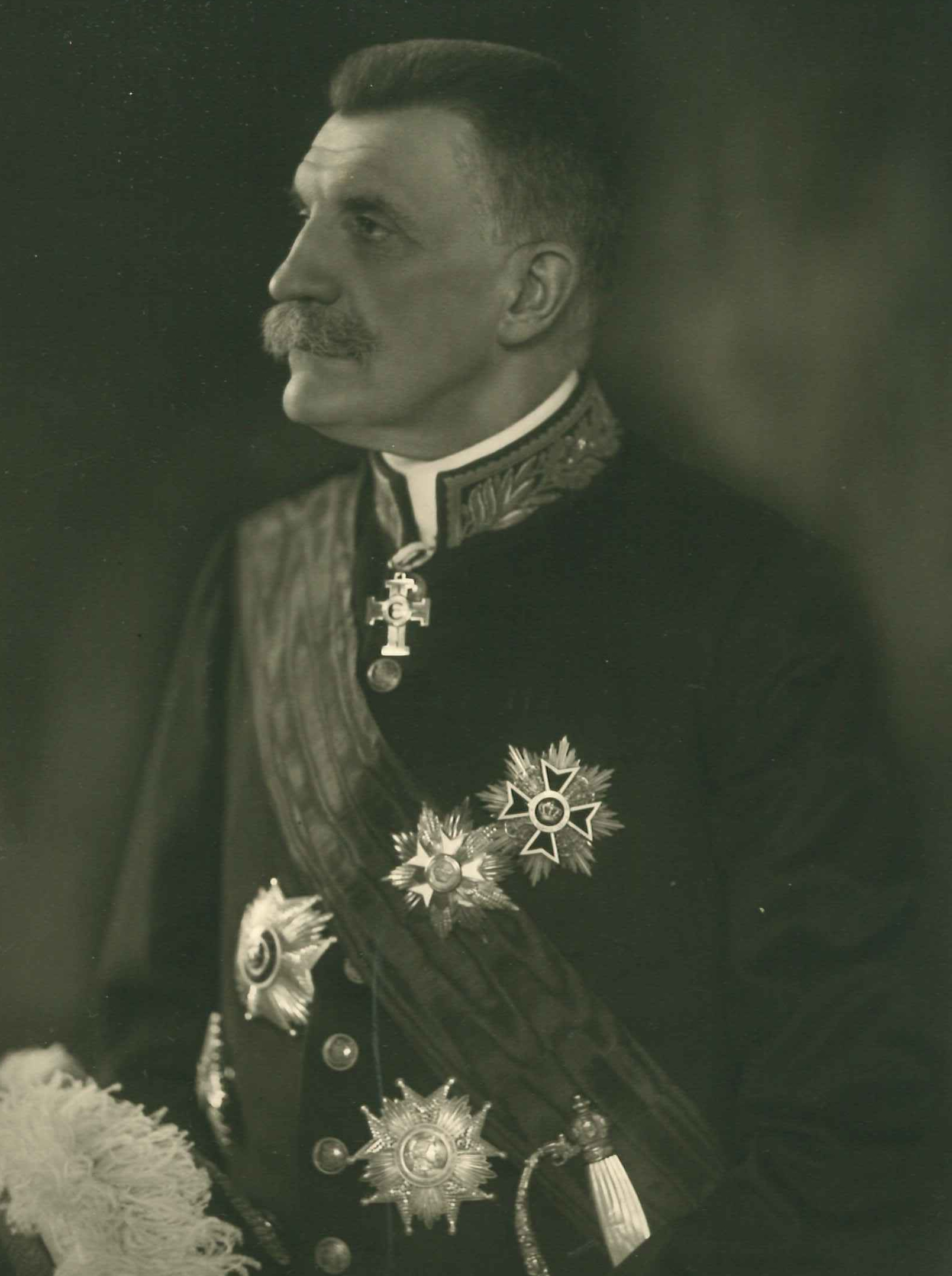
Prosper Poullet

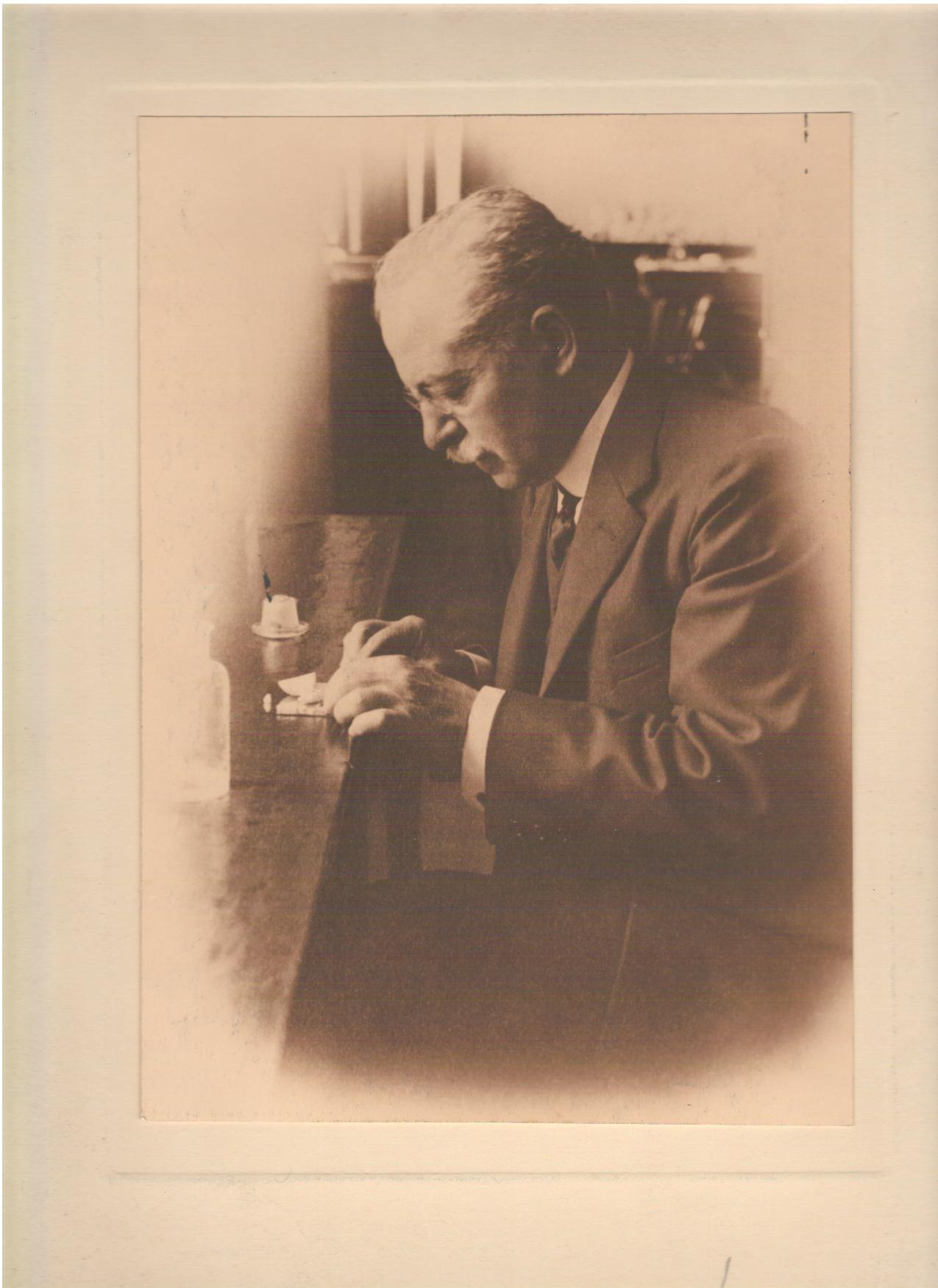
Dimitrie Călugăreanu

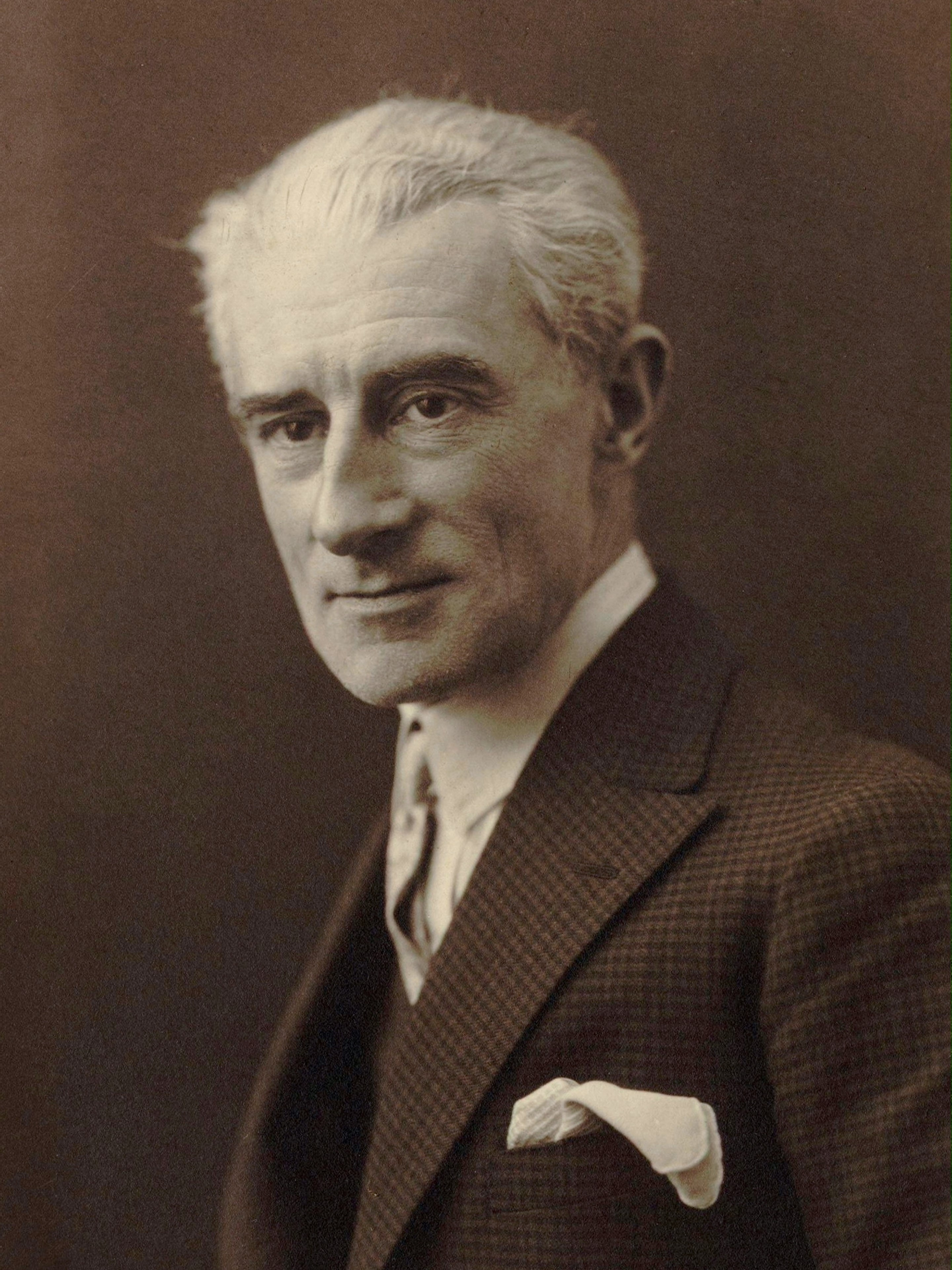
Maurice Ravel

- December 1 – Rao Guohua, Chinese general of the National Revolutionary Army (b. 1894)
- December 2 – Josep Comas i Solà, Andorran astronomer (b. 1868)
- December 3
  - Attila József, Hungarian poet (b. 1905)
  - Prosper Poullet, Belgian politician, 26th Prime Minister of Belgium (b. 1868)
  - Yue Yiqin, Chinese flying ace (b. 1914)
- December 4
  - Ralph Lewis, American actor (b. 1872)
  - Sir Sahibzada Abdul Qayyum, Indian politician and educationist (b. 1863)
- December 8
  - Hans Molisch, Czech-Austrian botanist (b. 1856)
  - Akhmet Baitursynov, Kazakh poet, politician, turkologist (b. 1872)
- December 9
  - Lilias Armstrong, British phonetician (b. 1882)
  - Gustaf Dalén, Swedish physicist, Nobel Prize laureate (b. 1869)
- December 10 – Robert Bolder, British actor (b. 1859)
- December 12 – Alfred Abel, German actor (b. 1879)
- December 14 – Fabián de la Rosa, Filipino painter (b. 1869)
- December 16 – Giorgi Mazniashvili, Soviet general (b. 1870)
- December 17 – Dimitrie Călugăreanu, Romanian physician, naturalist and physiologist (b. 1868)
- December 18 – Robert Worth Bingham, American politician (b. 1871)
- December 20 – Erich Ludendorff, German general (b. 1865)
- December 21
  - Meliton Balanchivadze, Soviet composer (b. 1862)
  - Ted Healy, American actor (b. 1896)
  - Frank B. Kellogg, United States Secretary of State, Nobel Peace Prize recipient (b. 1856)
- December 22 – Joseph Darby, British jumper (b. 1861)
- December 23 – Osman Nuri Hadžić, Bosnian writer (b. 1869)
- December 25 – Newton D. Baker, 37th Mayor of Cleveland, Ohio, United States Secretary of War (b. 1871)
- December 27
  - Sir Coote Hedley, British army officer and sportsman (b. 1865)
  - William N. Andrews, American politician and member of the United States House of Representatives from 1919 to 1921 (b. 1876)
- December 28
  - Herbert Bullmore, Scottish Rugby Union international player, grandfather of Kerry Packer (b. 1874)
  - Maurice Ravel, French composer (Boléro) (b. 1875)
  - Sir Algernon Thomas, New Zealand scientist (b. 1857)
- December 29
  - Frederik Beichmann, Norwegian jurist (b. 1859)
  - Don Marquis, American poet (b. 1878)
  - Frank H. Spearman, American writer (b. 1859)
- December 30 – Hans Niels Andersen, Danish businessman, founder of the East Asiatic Company (b. 1852)
- December 31 – Dezső Czigány, Hungarian painter (b. 1883)

== Nobel Prizes ==

- Physics – Clinton Joseph Davisson, George Paget Thomson
- Chemistry – Walter Haworth, Paul Karrer
- Physiology or Medicine – Albert von Szent-Györgyi Nagyrapolt
- Literature – Roger Martin du Gard
- Peace – Robert Cecil
