= Pedro Chutró =

Argentine physician (1880–1937)

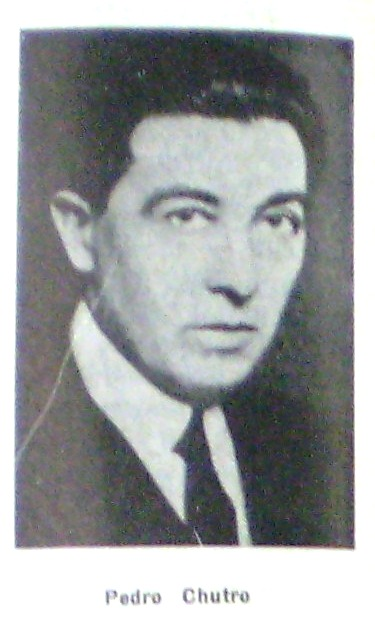
Pedro Chutró

Pedro Chutró (February 18, 1880 – October 19, 1937) was an Argentine physician who was a surgeon. He also practiced medicine during World War I.
