= National Council of the Algerian Revolution =

- Conseil national de la Révolution algérienne
- Abbreviation: CNRA
- Successor: Constituent Assembly
- Formation: 20 August 1956
- Founders: National Liberation Front (FLN)
- Dissolved: 6 June 1962 (last meeting; never reconvened)
- Type: Provisional unicameral assembly / supreme FLN council
- Headquarters: Cairo / Tripoli (meeting locations)
- Location: Algeria (in exile)
- Members: 34 (at foundation)
- President: Mohamed Seddik Ben Yahia

The National Council of the Algerian Revolution (CNRA; French: Conseil national de la Révolution algérienne) was created during the Soummam conference of the FLN. It served as the supreme organ of the FLN during the Algerian War of Independence. The CNRA alone was empowered to take decisions on political, military, economic and social orientation. The CNRA designated/appointed the members of the Comité de coordination et d'exécution (CCE).

== History ==
=== Creation ===
At its creation in August 1956, at the Congress of the Soummam, the CNRA comprised thirty-four members: seventeen full members and seventeen alternates. The statutes adopted specified that the CNRA was "the supreme body of the Algerian revolution, (...), director of the war of national liberation, holder of the sovereignty of the Algerian people, and, as such, provisional constituent and political governing body of the FLN" and that it "decides on the ceasefire by a four-fifths majority of members present or represented."

=== August 1957 meeting ===
The CNRA meeting held in Cairo on 27 August 1957 adopted the activity report of the CCE. The CNRA moved to "unravel the essential devices of the Congress of the Soummam" by adopting a new resolution stipulating that all participants in the liberation struggle, with or without uniform, were equal. Consequently, there was to be no primacy of the political over the military nor a distinction between inside (Algeria) and outside (external FLN structures). The CNRA approved the enlargement of the committee from 34 to 54 members (all full members) and expanded the CCE from five to nine leaders.

=== August 1961 meeting ===
The CNRA met in Tripoli from 9 to 27 August 1961 to debate the negotiations of the Évian Accords and the organisation of power. It removed Ferhat Abbas from the presidency of the GPRA and appointed Benyoucef Benkhedda in his place.

=== February 1962 meeting ===
The CNRA met in Tripoli from 11 to 18 February 1962; the GPRA presented a report on the preliminary "Rousses" agreement (the precursor to the Évian Accords). The CNRA unanimously approved the report and agreed to continue negotiations.

=== May–June 1962 meeting ===
The CNRA met in Tripoli from 25 May to 6 June 1962. On the first agenda item the Council unanimously approved the Évian Accords. On the second item — the designation of a political bureau — the atmosphere grew heated. To calm tensions, Omar Boudaoud, presiding, suspended the session and announced it would reconvene the next day. The CNRA never met again after that session.

== Members ==
The members of the CNRA recorded as members at its foundation are listed below. Full members are marked with an asterisk (*) and alternates with a double asterisk (**).

- Mohammed Seddik Benyahia (**) — President
- Omar Boudaoud — First Assessor
- Ali Kafi — Second Assessor
- Abane Ramdane (*)
- Mostefa Ben Boulaïd (*)
- Aïssat Idir (*)
- Saïd Mohammedi (**)
- Mohamed Boudiaf (*)
- Hocine Aït Ahmed (*)
- Saad Dahlab (**)
- Lakhdar Bentobal (**)
- Krim Belkacem (*)
- Benyoucef Benkhedda (*)
- Ahmed Ben Bella (*)
- Larbi Ben M'hidi (*)
- Rabah Bitat (*)
- Mohamed Lamine Debaghine (*)
- Slimane Dehiles
- Mhamed Yazid (*)
- Mohamed Khider (*)
- Ferhat Abbas (*)
- Mohand Ameziane Yazourene
- Lakhdar Bouregaa
- Boualem Bessaih
- Lamine Khene
- Youcef Zighoud (*)
- Bachir Chihani (**)
- Slimane Oujlis (**)
- Abdelhafid Boussouf (**)
- Ali Mellah (Si-Cherif) (**)
- Mohamed El-Yajouri (**)
- Ahmed Francis (**)
- Brahim Mezhoudi (**)
- Abdelhamid Mehri (**)
- Tewfik El Madani (*)
- Ismaïl Mahfoud
- Amar Ouamrane (*)
- Abdelmalek Temmam (**)
- Tayeb Thaâlibi (alias Si Allal) (**)
- Ali Haroun
- Ali Mendjeli

== See also ==
- Soummam conference
