= Mostéfa Merarda =

Military figure during the Algerian War

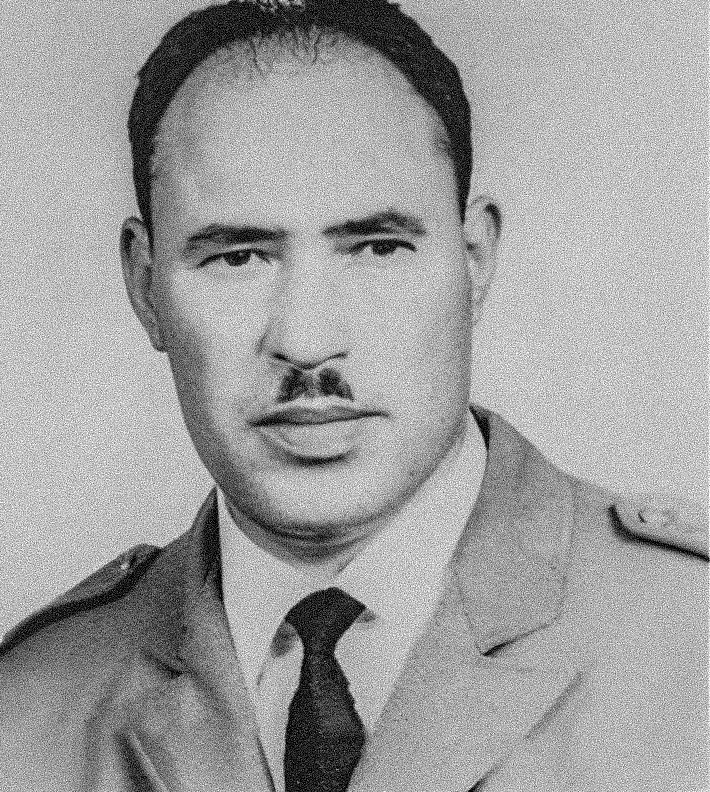
- Mostéfa Merarda as a teenager
- Nickname: Bennoui
- Born: August 21, 1928; Oued Chaaba, Algeria
- Died: May 18, 2007 (aged 78) Batna (city), Algeria
- Allegiance: National Liberation Front
- Branch: National Liberation Army
- Service years: 1954-2007
- Rank: Commanding officer
- Commands: Wilayah I
- Conflicts: Algerian War
- Children: Sons: Hamid, Ali, Chérif and Abdelmoumen; Daughters: Messaouda, Nadia and Leila

Mostéfa Merarda, nicknamed Bennoui (August 21, 1928 -May 18, 2007) was a commander and acting chief of Wilayah I during the Algerian War. The second of his siblings, he was educated at a school in the town of Batna. At the age of 17, he married his cousin and became a farmer, before joining the independence movements that led to the Algerian War.

He became interim head of the Wilayah after Mohamed Tahar Abidi left for Tunisia. On November 25, 1961, he also returned to Tunisia, where he was appointed to represent the Algerian delegation in Havana. He then took part in the 1962 Tripoli congress, and was one of the witnesses to the 1962 Algerian crisis.

After the Algerian independence, he held several positions in Algeria and abroad. A few years before his death, he wrote his memoirs in Arabic, which were translated into French by Dahmane Nedjar and printed in two editions.

== Biography ==
=== Childhood ===
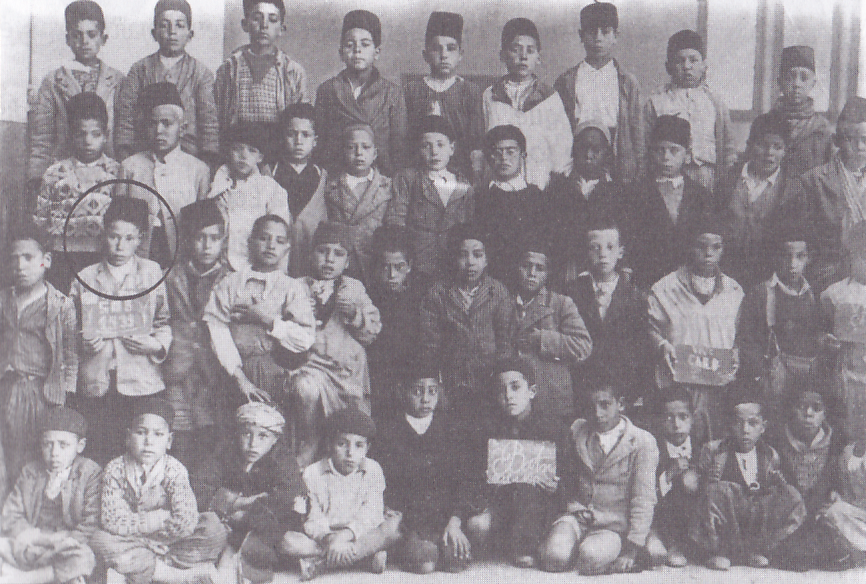
Mostéfa Merarda at the Batna indigenous school in 1939.

Mostéfa Merarda was born on August 21, 1928 in the Ouled Chlih douar (in Victor Duruy, now Oued Chaaba) in the haouz of Aïn Touta, in the Batna Province. He was the second eldest child in his family. He got his first name from his uncle, who died of a typhus epidemic, and from his grandfather, of whom he was the favorite, being the only boy among his grandchildren.

In 1936, his grandfather brought him to Aïn Touta and sent him to boarding school with Si Makhlouf Mohammed, in a village attached to the administrator of Aïn Touta. He stayed with Si Makhlouf Mohammed and his wife Boudiaf Rahouia for two years, after which he joined the indigenous school where he learned French. At school, his classmates included future PPA militants and military and political leaders of the revolution, notably Rachid Bouchemal, Bekkouche Mostéfa, Abdelhamid Boudiaf, Hamou Belkadi and many others. Outside the classroom, he learned Arabic and the Quran from Sheikh Si Séghir Zidani Lamaafi. He was also taught by his uncle, Sheikh Brahim Zidani. He remained at this school until 1941, when he joined his family in the village of Ouled Chlih, in the Oued Chaaba commune.

=== Adolescence ===
In the summer of 1945, he was 17 when it was decided by his father that he would marry his cousin, the daughter of his uncle Amor. The wedding party took place in Maafa. In 1947, he moved to Aïn Touta, to continue his studies at a free school run by the Association of Algerian Muslim Ulema, attached to the town's mosque. Between 1947 and 1948, Mohamed Tahar Abidi, known as El Hadj Lakhdar, rented business premises in Aïn Touta, where he ran a café and a hammam where the two would meet to pass the time and discuss a variety of subjects, notably World War II and the events of May 8, 1945, and it was here that the first ideas for a revolution against colonization began to germinate in their minds.

In 1952, he devoted himself to his family property at Kesrou, currently in the commune of Fesdis, and was interested in ways of making the soil bear fruit and improving crop yields and farm produce, but working the land didn't prevent him from keeping in touch with his many friends, most of whom were PPA militants.

=== During the independence war ===
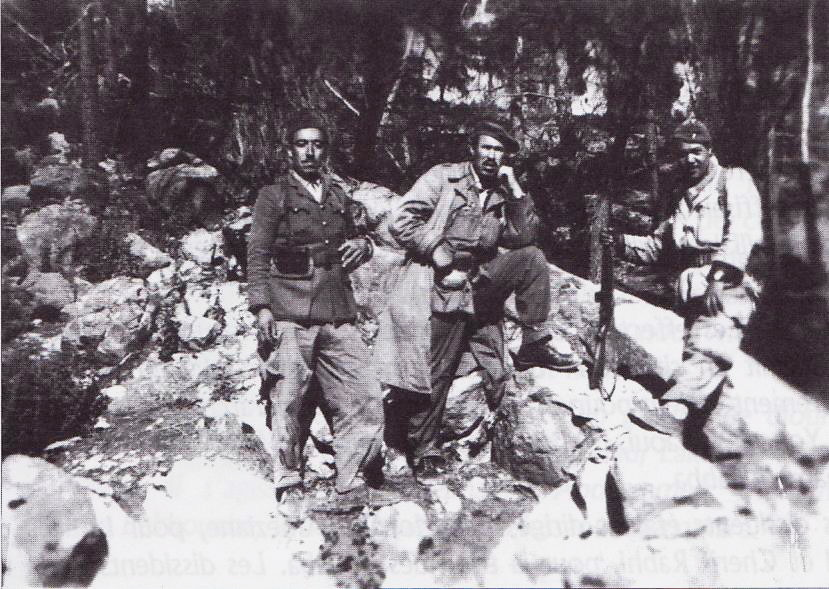
At H.Q. in Cedar Peak (from left to right Abdeldjebbar Derghal, Mostéfa Merarda, Lakhdar Gouaref).

His relationship with the armed revolution dates back to the early days of its outbreak. This was when a group of early maquisards led by Belkacem Grine returned from an operation against the Seriana settlement on the night of November 12–13, 1954. On the afternoon of November 13, 1954, Mostéfa Merarda was working his land, when a man appeared with his companions, introduced himself as Grine and, acting under the direction of Mostefa Ben Boulaïd, then asked Mostéfa Merarda to summon the heads of the families, to explain to them the situation in the country, and the goals set by the revolution.

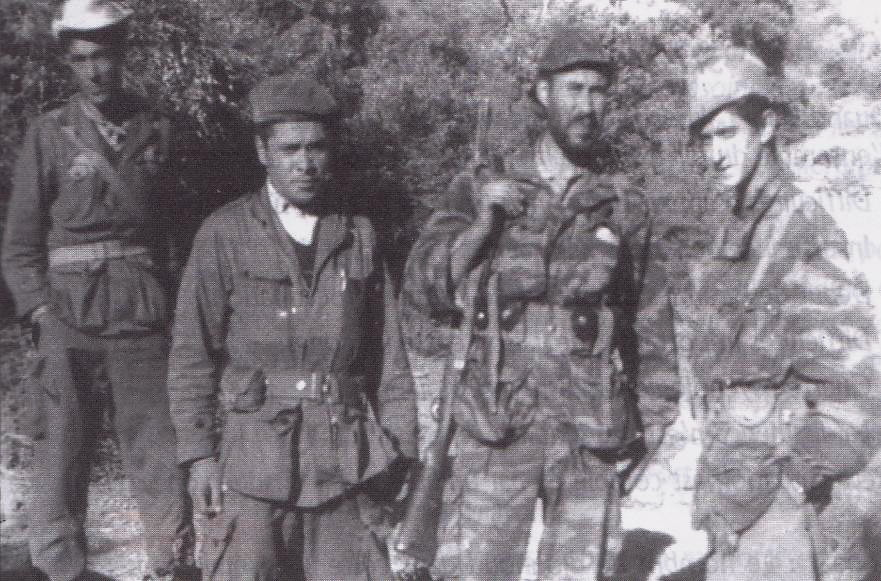
Mostéfa Merarda, rifle at the shoulder at the headquarters of Wilayah I.

He wanted to join Belkacem Grine's group, but Grine asked him to provide another type of help, and his house became a focal point. He was in charge of stocking up on clothing, shoes, ammunition, weapons and repairing defective weaponry, as well as maintaining contact with notables from Hidoussa, Ouled Fatma, Ouled Menaa, all the way to the Haraktas and Batna, the latter departing from his home.

Mostéfa Merarda took part in the battle of Tinezouagh in October 1956. Then, at the end of 1956, El Hadj Lakhdar, who had become head of the Batna zone following the construction of Zone 1 by Amirouche Aït Hamouda, tasked Mostéfa Merarda, Ahmed Tayeb Maache, Tahar Bouguarn and Smail Chaabani with creating and organizing the popular committees provided for by the Soummam conference, to strengthen support for the revolution. At the time, the French authorities killed an Algerian who closely resembled Mostéfa Merarda. His name was Ahmed Zeroual. Thinking it was him, they published the information in the newspaper La Dépêche de Constantine.

In 1957, he was appointed head of region (Nahya) 4, zone 1 by Hihi Mekki, replacing Amor Hidji. In 1958, he became acting commander of Wilayah I, and in 1959, El Hadj Lakhdar entrusted him with responsibility for Zone 2 in Chelia, in addition to Wilayah I. In the same year, he became interim head of Wilayah I, after El Hadj Lakhdar left for Tunisia on March 29, 1959. His mission was to take charge of the Wilayah during El Hadj Lakhdar's absence.

=== Departure from Wilayah I ===
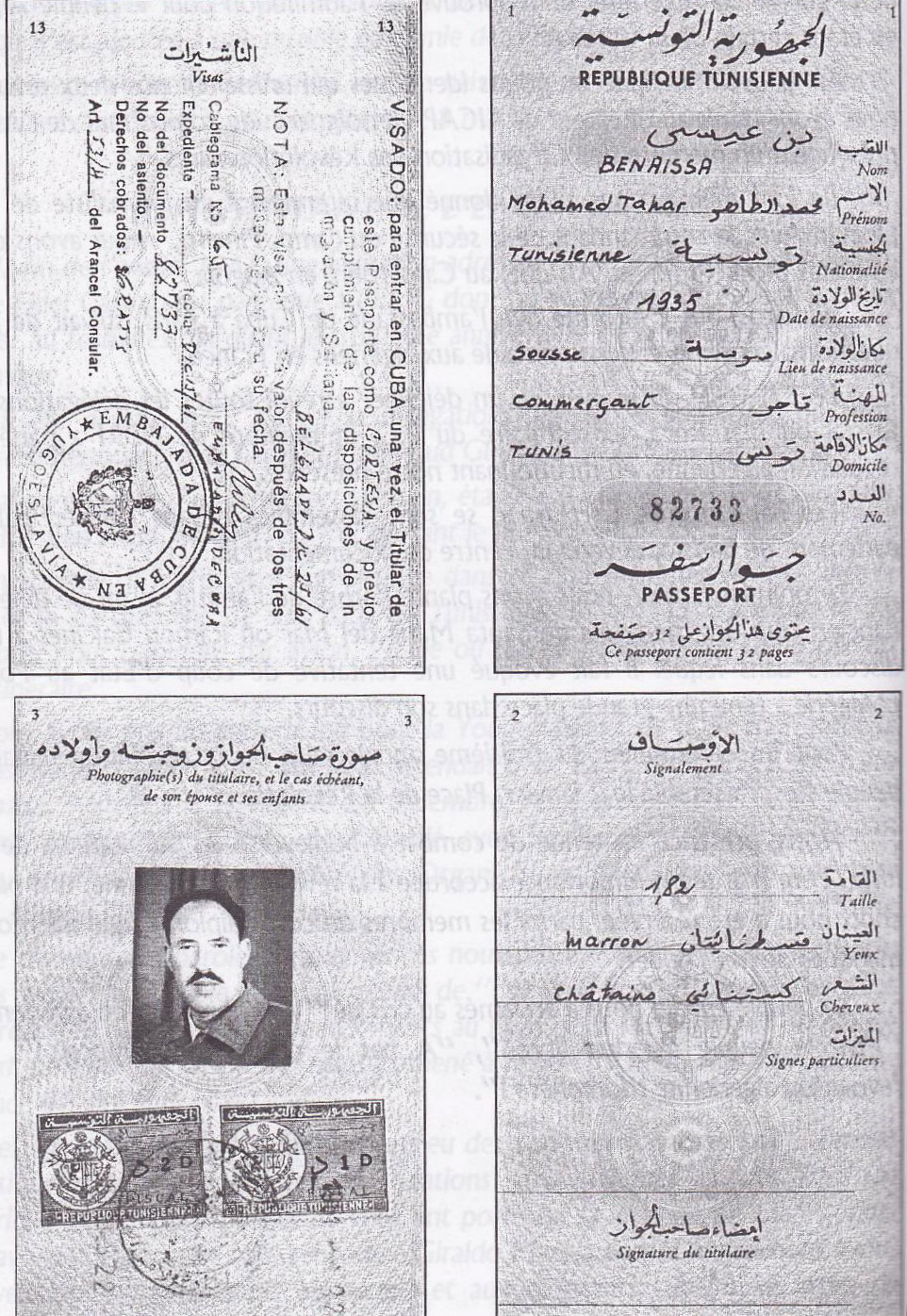
Mostéfa Merarda's Tunisian passport.

The departure for Tunisia began on October 25, 1961 from the Kimmel command post. Mostéfa Merarda and his companions took the road in the direction of the Sahara (Zeribet El Oued, Chott Melrhir, the Grand Erg Oriental, Debdeb and southern Tunisia) with the help of a guide. On November 25, 1961, they reached Tunisian territory. At Redeyef, the group met FLN representative Said Boukhalfa, who accompanied them to El Kef, where the heads of the General Staff (Houari Boumédiène, Ali Mendjeli and Kaïd Ahmed) were present, before leaving for Tunis, where they met members of the Provisional Government of the Algerian Republic such as Belkacem Krim, Benyoucef Benkhedda and Ferhat Abbas. On December 21, 1961, he gave an interview to the newspaper El Moudjahid, published under the title "Sept ans de guerre en Wilaya I" ("Seven years of war in Wilayah I").

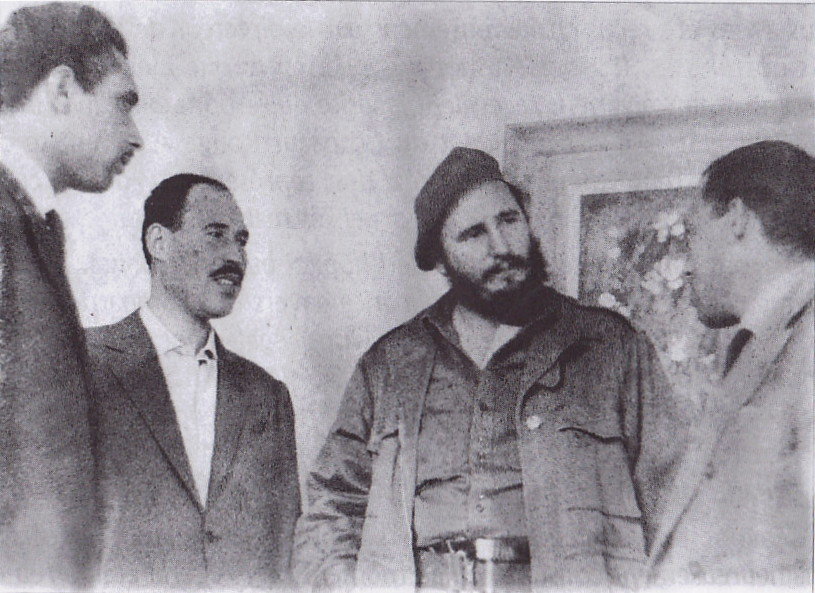
Algerian delegation with Fidel Castro.

Mostéfa Merarda was appointed to represent the Algerian delegation with two other members (Taybi Larbi and Mahmoud Guennez) in Havana, following Fidel Castro's invitation to the General Staff to take part in the festivities marking the third anniversary of the Cuban revolution. For his trip to Cuba, he was able to use a forged Tunisian passport issued on December 21, 1961. Mostéfa and Mahmoud Guennez left Tunis on December 25 towards Italy, where Taybi Larbi joined them by a different route. They took another flight to Yugoslavia and from there a train to Czechoslovakia, finally reaching Havana on December 28 after a transit via Canada. There, they were welcomed by Giraldo Mazola, director of the Cuban Institute of Friendship with the Peoples, accompanied by Ramon Calcines, a member of the Integrated Revolutionary Organizations. On December 29 and 30, the Algerian delegation mingled with others from socialist countries, Afro-Asian nations and Latin American countries, where they discussed the Algerian people's struggle for independence. On January 2, Mostéfa and his companions were able to meet Fidel Castro. The group stayed in Cuba until January 13, when they returned to Prague.

=== Évian Accords and Tripoli Conference ===
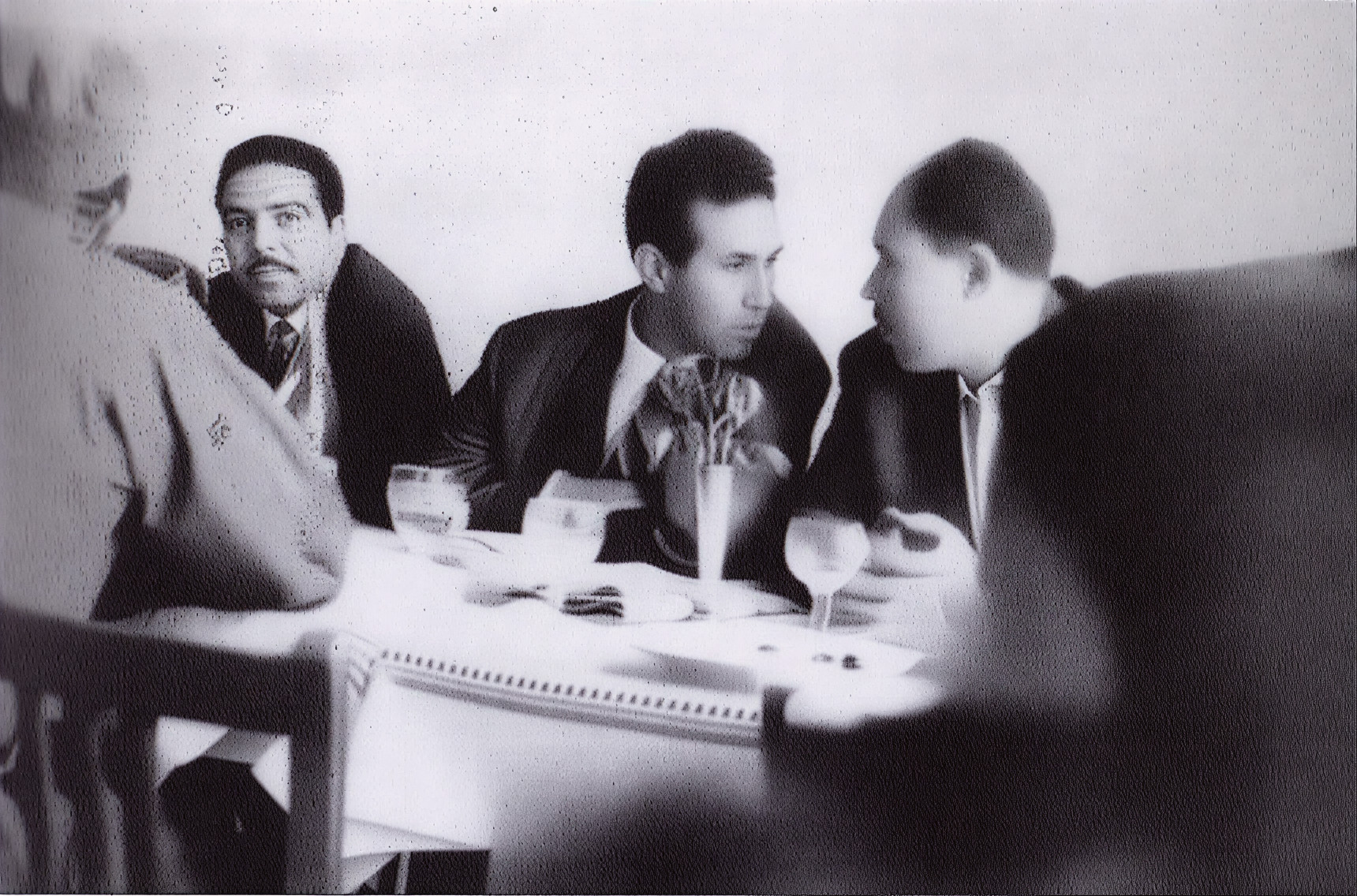
At the Tripoli Conference: Ahmed Bencherif, Ben Bella and Mostéfa Merarda.

During February 1962, the members of the CNRA were summoned by the GPRA to Tripoli, to examine the results of negotiations with French representatives. Mostéfa joined Hadj Lakhdar and Abdelhafid Boussouf in the Libyan capital. The meeting took place on February 18, 19 and 20. Before the members of the CNRA, a report on the results of the negotiations concluded by the Évian Accords was presented by GPRA President Benyoucef Benkhedda, in the presence of Krim Belkacem, Boussouf and Lakhdar Ben Tobbal, who announced that the ceasefire date had been set for March 19, 1962.

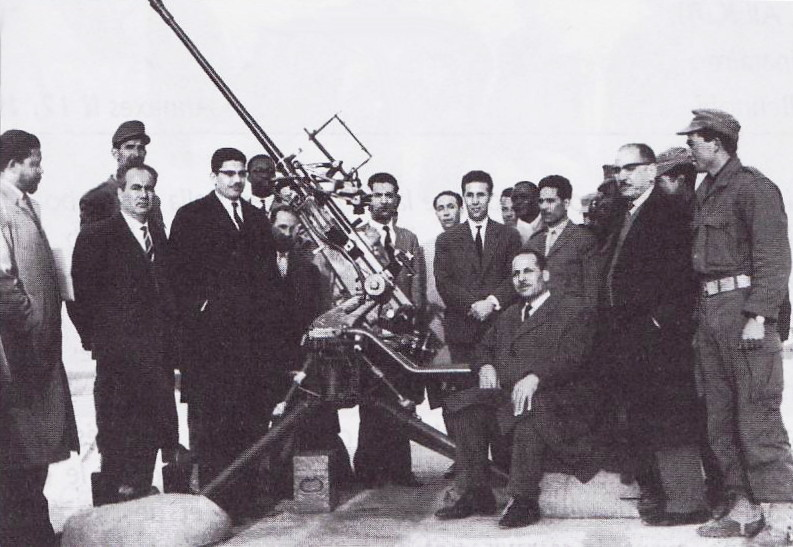
Western border, March 1962.

As soon as he returned to Tunis after the February CNRA meeting, he and his companions made arrangements to travel to Morocco to welcome the Cinq. (Note: The Cinq were: Mohamed Boudiaf, Ahmed Ben Bella, Hocine Aït Ahmed and Rabah Bitat. The imprisoned FLN leaders.) He flew to Morocco via Italy and Spain, and during his stay in Morocco, a visit was organized to the western border to give the freed leaders an opportunity to learn about the realities of the ALN and its organization.

On his return to Tunisia, he received an invitation dated May 7, 1962, to attend the Tripoli Conference scheduled for May 25–31 of the same year. After the conference, he returned to Tunis, where he remained until the day of the referendum on self-determination. According to Mostéfa Merarda's memoirs, Houari Boumédiène did not want to let him return home with El Hadj Lakhdar, to keep him close to him and team up after their return to Algeria. However, Mostéfa went with him anyways. Boumédiène, in turn, issued instructions to prevent him from leaving Tunisian territory. The Algerian border army made him get off the bus linking Algeria and Tunisia three times, but in the end they let him pass and he was able to reach the town of Batna.

=== Return to Algeria ===
When the Algerian Frontier Army arrived on Algerian soil, the General Staff moved to Souk Ahras. Mostefa and El Hadj Lakhdar came to meet Mahmoud Chérif, the GPRA's Minister of Armaments and Supply, in Batna; they then made the trip to Souk Ahras, where Houari Boumédiène was staying, but Boumédiène refused to receive them. According to Mostéfa Merarda, Houari Boumédiène certainly thought they had made contact to rally to the GPRA's cause. Afterwards, they returned to Batna and arranged a meeting in Tlemcen.

In Tlemcen, the General Staff wanted to negotiate with the GPRA, but no result was achieved between the two parties, leading to the Algerian crisis of 1962. With Mostefa and El Hadj Lakhdar in one car and Yacef Saâdi in another, they all headed for Algiers, where a roadblock was set up by units of Wilayah IV to prevent them from entering the capital. Mostefa escaped unhurt.

=== Post-independence life and death ===
Between 1965 and 1967, Mostéfa Mérarda became a military attaché in Baghdad, then director of the Tlemcen Cadet School between 1967 and 1970. In 1976, he was elected deputy to the People's National Assembly, finishing his term in 1982. In 1990, he became a member of the National Moudjahidines Council. On May 18, 2007, he died at the age of 79.

== The commander's memoirs ==
Mostéfa Mérarda's memoirs were first written in Arabic, by Messaoud Fellouci under the title Témoignages et positions sur la marche de la révolution dans la wilaya I (Testimonies and positions on the march of the revolution in Wilayah I), then translated into French, by Dahmane Nedjar under another title Sept Ans de maquis dans les Aurès (Seven years of resistance in the Aurès) and printed in two editions (2004 by Editions Dar el Hodna and 2013 by ANEP). His memoirs were the subject of a conference at which all the commander's surviving trench comrades came to give their accounts of the man.

== See also ==
- Algerian War

== Bibliography ==
- Merarda, Mostéfa (2004). Dar el Houdna (ed.). Sept ans de maquis en Aurés : témoignage et positions sur la marche de la révolution dans la wilaya 1 [Seven years of maquis in the Aurés: testimony and positions on the course of the revolution in Wilayah I] (in French) (1 ed.). Aïn M'lila. ISBN 9947-0-0489-9.
- Hilaili, Mohamed Seghir (2012). شاهد علي الثورة في الأوراس [Witness to a revolution in the Aurès region] (in Arabic). Oran: Dar El Qods El arabi. ISBN 9789947927588.
