= Congress of Soummam =

FLN congress during the Algerian War

Coordinates: 36.7500°N 5.0667°E

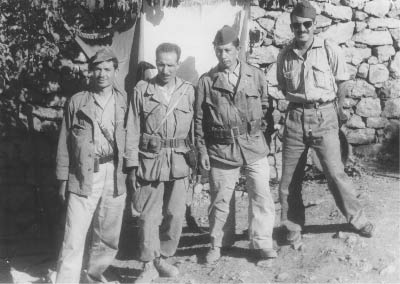
Congress of Soummam Conference

The Congress of Soummam was the founding act of the modern Algerian state and a crucial element of success of the Algerian War of Independence. It took place on 20 August 1956, when the FLN's leadership in Algeria met secretly in the Soummam Valley (Ighbane and Ifri at Ouzellaguen) to compose a common platform and create a new organizational structure.

== The Soummam platform ==
The Soummam platform reaffirmed the international strategy first outlined by Hocine Aït Ahmed. Rather than a military victory, it looked for "the total weakening of the French army to make victory by arms impossible". In the process, the FLN would establish their bona fides as Algeria's legitimate government and adhere to international law. To that end, the Congress of Soummam formed a five-man Comité de Coordination et d'Exécution (CCE) consisting of Abane Ramdane, Ben M'hidi, Krim Belkacem, Benyoucef Benkhedda and Saad Dahlab —the last two were formerly Central Committee members of the Movement for the Triumph of Democratic Liberties. A larger Conseil National de la Révolution Algérienne (CNRA) would serve as the supreme authority. In the meantime, the FLN intended to engineer such social and economic disruption in Metropolitan France and Algeria as to make it impossible for France to continue the war. Equally important, it would work for "the political isolation of France—in Algeria and in the world".

The three guiding principles of the FLN were codified: the primacy of the political over the military, the primacy of the interior over the exterior, and the concept of collective leadership at all echelons. Measures to increase support among the Algerian population and to eliminate opposing groups were adopted, and terms were laid down for any future peace negotiations with the French, including the very important provision that there should be no ceasefire before the French recognised Algerian independence. The negotiating points adopted at Soummam were subsequently adhered to without modification until independence was achieved in 1962.

== Titular members ==
The National Council of the Algerian Revolution was designed after the conference and was composed of 34 members: 17 titular, and 17 alternates.

- Mostefa Ben Boulaïd
- Youssef Zighout
- Belkacem Krim
- Amar Ouamrane
- Larbi Ben M’Hidi
- Rabah Bitat
- Mohamed Boudiaf
- Ramdane Abane
- Ahmed Ben Bella
- Mohamed Khider
- Hocine Aït Ahmed
- Med Lamine Debaghine
- Idir Aïssat
- Ferhat Abbas
- M’hamed Yazid
- Benyoucef Ben Khedda
- Taoufik El Madani

== Alternate members ==
- Ben Boulaïd's Assistant
- Lakhdar Ben Tobbal
- Saïd Mohammedi
- Slimane Déhilès
- Abdelhafid Boussouf
- Ali Mellah
- Saâd Dahlab
- Salah Louanchi
- Mohammed Ben Yahia
- Abdelhamid Mehri
- Tayeb Thaâlibi
- Mohammed Lebdjaoui
- Ahmed Francis
- Aïssa Ben Atallah
- UGTA
- Brahim Mezhoudi
- Abdel-Malek Temmam
