= Larbi Ben M'hidi =

Algerian revolutionary

- العربي بن مهيدي
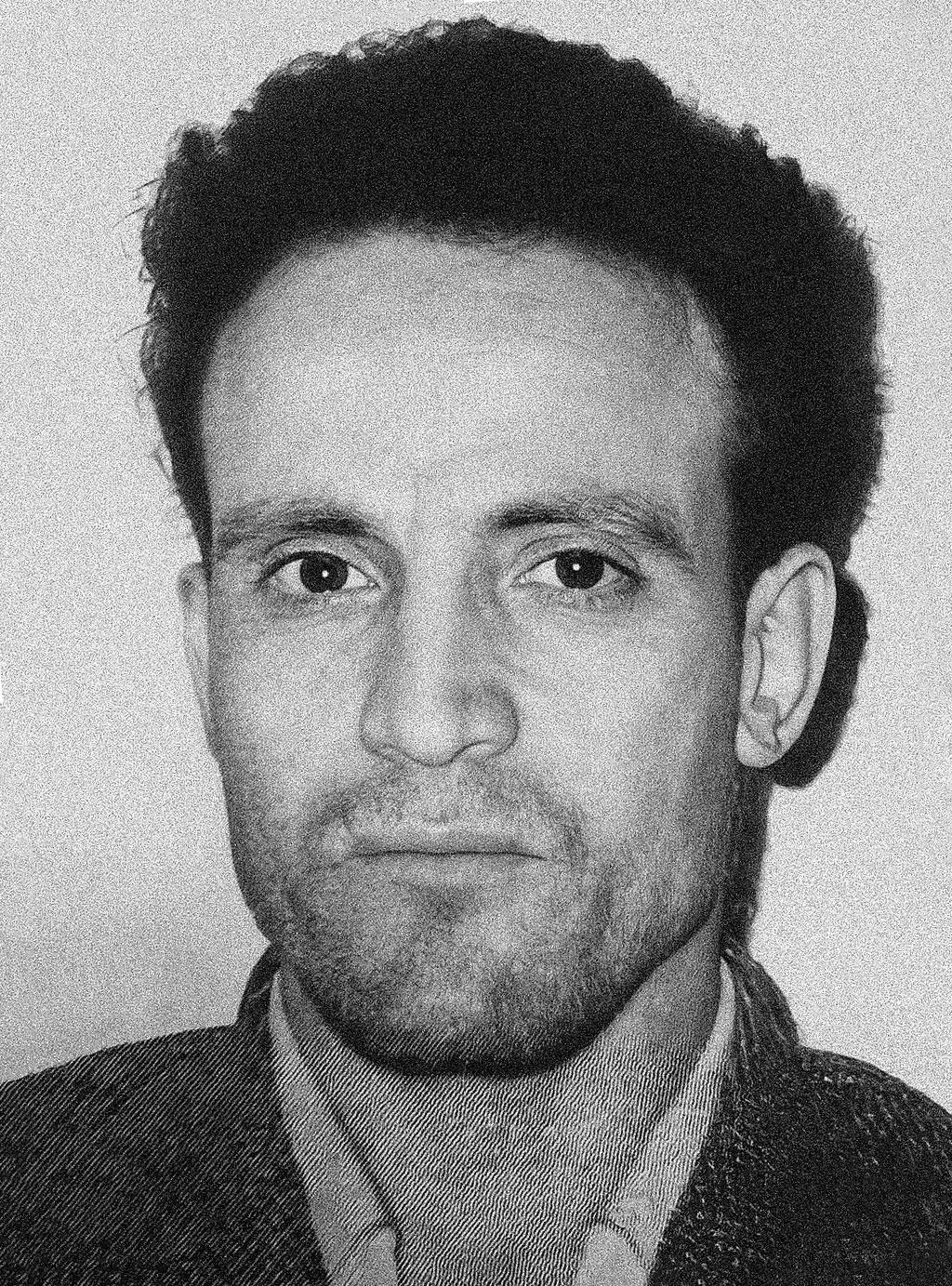
- Ben M'hidi portrait
- Born: Mohamed Larbi Ben M'hidi; 1923; Aïn M'lila, French Algeria (present-day Algeria)
- Died: 4 March 1957 (aged 33–34); Algiers, French Algeria
- Cause of death: extrajudicial hanging
- Resting place: Martyrs' Square, El Alia Cemetery, Algiers, Algeria
- Other names: El Hakim; Algerian Jean Moulin
- Known for: National Liberation Front; National Liberation Army; Toussaint Rouge; Algerian War; Soummam conference; Battle of Algiers
- Movement: FLN, ALN, CRUA, OS, MTLD

Mohammed Larbi Ben M'hidi (Arabic: محمد العربي بن مهيدي, romanized: Muḥammad al-ʿArbī ibn Mhīdī; 1923 – 4 March 1957), commonly known as Si Larbi, was an Algerian revolutionary and prominent figure during the Algerian War of Independence. He is one of the six founding members of the Algerian National Liberation Front (FLN) that launched an armed revolt throughout Algeria against French colonial rule and issued a proclamation calling for a sovereign Algerian state.

Ben M'hidi initially commanded Wilaya V (the military district in the Oran region) and played an important role at the FLN's Soummam conference in August 1956. He headed FLN operations during the Battle of Algiers where he was the last member of the FLN's Comité de Coordination et d'Exécution (CCE; Committee of Coordination and Implementation). Ben M'hidi was a strong believer in that the revolution should be directed by "internal" rather than "external" revolutionaries.

He was captured by French paratroopers in February 1957. His death was announced in March 1957 by Pierre Gorlin, Robert Lacoste's press officer. The events surrounding his death were disputed, and contended by many that he was in fact tortured before being summarily executed. Many who knew him, have ruled out the possibility of him taking his own life, as was reported in the media, due to his devotion to Islam, which forbids suicide. In 2000, General Aussaresses admitted that Ben M'hidi was executed whilst in his custody, however, the exact truth regarding his death remains a mystery to this day. Ben M'hidi is considered to be a national hero in Algeria and is considered to be a symbol of the revolution that brought an end to French colonialism. Following six decades of his assassination, on 1 November 2024, French president Emmanuel Macron, acknowledged that Ben M'hidi was "assassinated by French soldiers" in 1957.

== Early life ==
Larbi Ben M'hidi was born sometime in 1923 to a marabout family who formed a large tribe between the town of Ain-M'lila and the village of El-Gourzi—a town known as Douar El-Kouahi, which was part of the Constantine department at the time. Whose related families descend from the Ouled Derradj. At the age of 4 he started studying Quran and became a Hafiz, at his grandfather's religious school and mosque, which was later destroyed by French authorities. He attended a French school in Batna so that he could continue his studies – this is where he received his primary school certificate (Certificat d'études primaires élémentaires). The Ben M'hidi family later moved to Biskra, where Larbi Ben M'hidi began secondary school. In 1939, he joined the Algerian Muslim Scouts, where he became a group leader within a very short period of time and got interested in armed struggle. He applied for a job in supplies section of French barracks as he wanted to get near the army, he was eventually hired. He stole a gun and some notes which had information and then stopped working there and dedicated his life to politics and serving the country.

== Rebellion ==
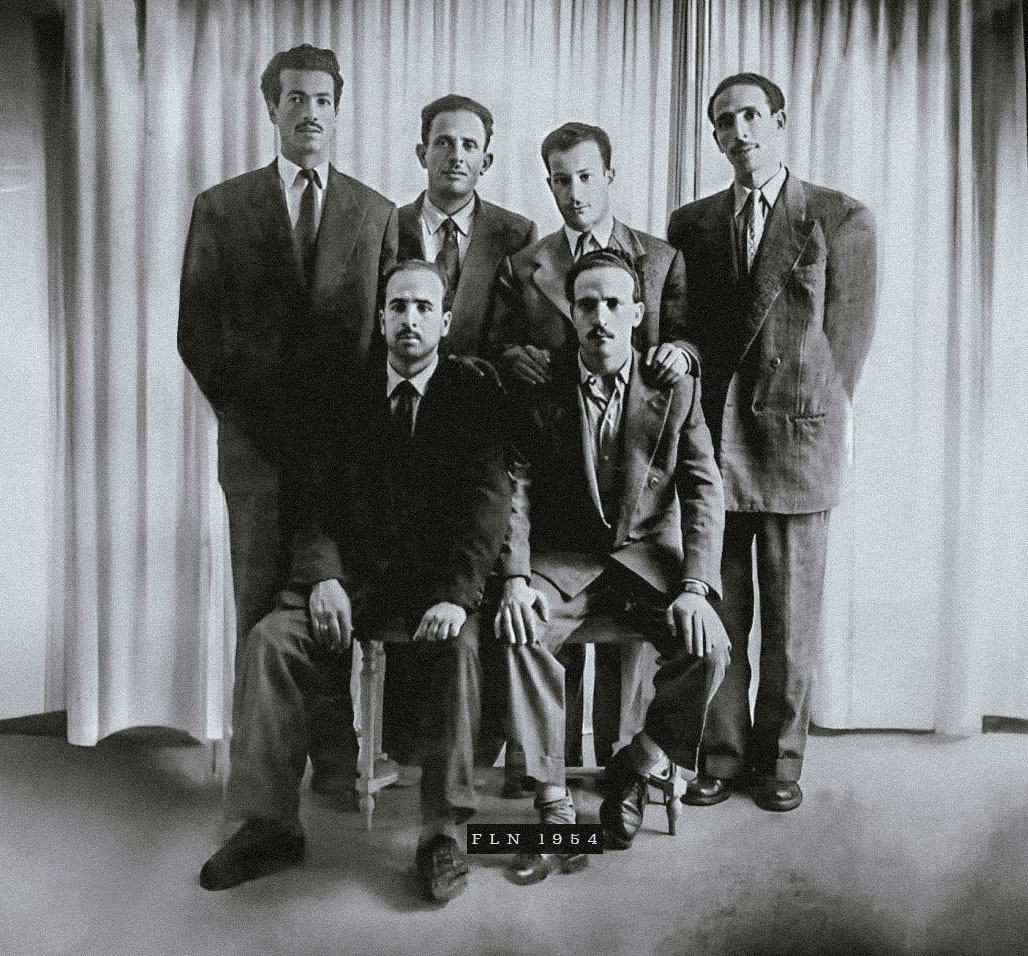
The six founders of the National Liberation Front. Larbi Ben M'hidi is sitting on the right. Photograph taken on 24 October 1954.

Ben M'hidi became a follower of Messali Hadj and was a member of Messali's Algerian People's Party (PPA) during World War II, rapidly obtaining significant responsibilities within the movement. Ben M'hidi was arrested the day after the Sétif uprising against the occupying French forces in May 1945. The uprising was suppressed through what is now known as the Sétif massacre. He was arrested in Biskra and imprisoned in the Coudiat prison in Constantine for four months. The massacres committed by the French army in Setif, Guelma and Kherrata had completely shocked him. On 15 March 1946, Ben M'Hidi was released from prison due to an amnesty being granted to the majority of nationalists imprisoned for the 1945 riots. The PPA was disbanded following the 1945 Sétif riots, and was replaced in October 1946 by the Movement for the Triumph of Democratic Liberties (MTLD), also headed by Messali Hadj. In 1950, Ben M'hidi had been convicted in absentia and sentenced to 10 years in prison. Ben M'hidi and eight other members of this movement soon grew impatient with Hadj, and decided to form the Revolutionary Committee of Unity and Action (CRUA), on 30 March 1954. During May and June 1954, they decided that Algeria would be split into five areas; Ben M'hidi was assigned Zone 5, Oran. On 10 October, Larbi Ben M'hidi and five other members of the CRUA approved the transformation, thus giving birth to the National Liberation Front (FLN) and the National Liberation Army (ALN). At a meeting at the Climat de France, a house overlooking Bab El Oued, the FLN decided to launch an insurrection, which broke out in the early morning of 1 November 1954, and quickly escalated into the Algerian War. The outbreak soon became known as "Toussaint Rouge" (Red All Saints Day) as it coincided with the Catholic festival. The rebellion was conducted internally by Ben M'hidi, Mourad Didouche, Rabah Bitat, Krim Belkacem, Mohammed Boudiaf, and Mostefa Ben Boulaïd, while three more members (Hocine Ait Ahmed, Ahmed Ben Bella, and Mohammed Khider) were operating externally in Cairo. They later became known as "The Men of November".

Ben M'hidi was designated Wilaya V (Oran), however, he encountered exceptional difficulties as the area had been recently struck by an earthquake, and arms that were promised had not arrived.

On 2 November 1955, Ben M'hidi took command of the Zone Autonome d'Alger (ZAA) and appointed Yacef Saadi as his aide. On 25 June 1956, an FLN tract authored by Ben M'Hidi and Abane Ramdane declared: "All executions of combatants will be followed by reprisals. For each FLN soldier guillotined, a hundred Frenchmen will be cut down."

=== Soummam Conference ===
On 20 August 1956, a congress assembled in the Soummam Valley in the Kabyle. Ben M'hidi attended alone from Wilaya V (Oran). He also deputized for the "externals" in absentia, as he was the delegate to have been most recently in contact with their views. The first session was presided over by Ben M'hidi, with Abane Ramdane as secretary. Ben M'hidi had criticized the "uselessly bloody operations" which had given a bad impression on public opinion, specifically citing Zighout's massacre at El-Halia which had occurred exactly one year previously. He had also criticized Amirouche where perhaps over a thousand dissident Muslims had been "liquidated" in a village near Bougie. The conference lasted 20 days ending sometime in September 1956. The French authorities had no knowledge that many of their most important adversaries were assembled in one place.

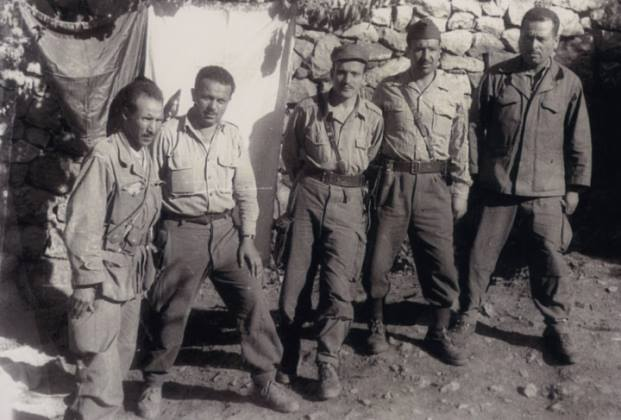
Youcef Zighout, Abane Ramdane, Ben M'hidi, Krim Belkacem and Amar Ouamrane. Photograph taken in August/September 1956.

During the conference, Ben M'hidi was elected along with Abane Ramdane and Krim Belkacem to the Comité de Coordination et d'Exécution (CCE; Committee of Coordination and Implementation) where they were given the responsibility in running the Algerian War of Independence.

=== Battle of Algiers ===
In August 1956, Ben M'hidi handed over Oran to Abdelhafid Boussouf and assumed command in Algiers, as he was given the responsibility after the election for launching the Battle of Algiers. On 30 September 1956, he began a campaign of bombing attacks targeting Europeans. In January 1957, he suggested the idea of an insurrectional strike. It took place on 28 January 1957. It caught the attention of the world and the United Nations (UN). Ben M'hidi did not stay longer than two days in each hideout in the Casbah with his companions as two thousand paratroopers were searching for FLN members.

=== Capture and execution ===
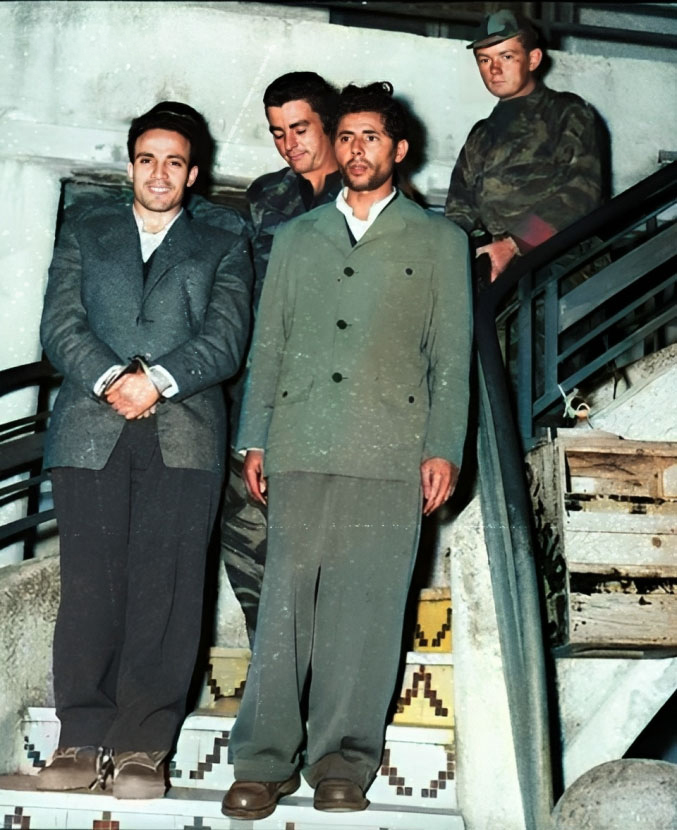
Ben M'hidi upon his arrest in 1957

Ben M'hidi was captured by Marcel Bigeard and his men on 23 February 1957 after receiving a tip-off provided by Roger Trinquier's network of informers. The details regarding Larbi Ben M'hidi's arrest are controversial, as there are several versions which contradict each other. According to French sources, parachutists burst into an apartment on Rue Claude Debussy, in the European quarter, and arrested Larbi Ben M'hidi in his pajamas. Apparently, they thought they were on the trail of Ben Khedda, who was another leader of the Coordinating and Executing Committee (CCE). The other members of the committee had fled to the mountains or abroad (primarily Tunis). The photograph of his arrest was published the following day in all the newspapers in Algiers. The photograph showed Larbi Ben M'hidi with handcuffs on his wrists and ankles, with a cheerful brave face. Ben M'hidi also appeared in video footage released by the French press, alongside Brahim Chergui, the liaison chief of the Zone Autonome d'Alger (ZAA) who was arrested on 24 February 1957. Ben M'hidi was seen to be smiling towards the camera, and exchanging words with the armed paratroopers. He was handcuffed and had his feet shackled on the video footage, unlike Brahim Chergui. The footage was taken in El Biar at then Colonel Bigeard's command post.

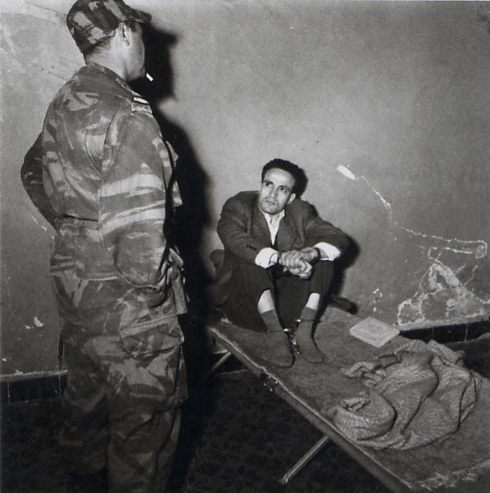
Larbi Ben M'hidi in custody

Marcel Bigeard personally interrogated Ben M'hidi, and according to him would not allow him to be tortured. After two weeks of questioning, Ben M'hidi showed no sign of backing down, and Bigeard grew to like and respect him. During the interrogation, Ben M'hidi constantly stood up to his interrogators, due to the extensive pressure of the interrogation, insisting that Algeria would be victorious in the battle and that the Algerian people would be liberated. Bigeard was impressed with Larbi Ben M'hidi's defiance and dignity, even though defeated, he proved that he was in no way, shape, or form broken, mentally, physically or spiritually. When told the war was lost he responded by citing the 'Chant des Partisans' of the French Resistance: 'Another will take my place'.

General Jacques Massu, however, was frustrated with Bigeard's slow progress, and arranged for Ben M'hidi to be transferred into the custody of Major Paul Aussaresses. According to a report to the CCE on 4 March 1957 made by an FLN spy who had been working in the Algiers police headquarters, Bigeard "was unable to prevent Ben M’hidi being handed over to men of a 'special section' of the paratroops. These interrogated him on their own initiative, and killed him last night". Under Aussaresses, Ben M'hidi was tortured, and then driven to an isolated farm 18 kilometres south of Algiers, where he was hanged – "to make it look like suicide". On 6 March 1957, Pierre Gorlin (Robert Lacoste's press officer) announced that Ben M'hidi "had committed suicide by hanging himself with strips of material torn from his shirt". His body was later transferred to Maillot hospital in Algiers. On arrival, two French medical officers stated officially after examining him that he was already dead. General Jacques Massu claimed that Ben M'hidi was "still breathing" on his way to hospital after hanging himself with an electric flex during the night. Everyone who knew him insisted that he would never take his own life. They believe this because he was a devout Muslim and the religion of Islam forbids suicide.

== Post-execution and memorial ==
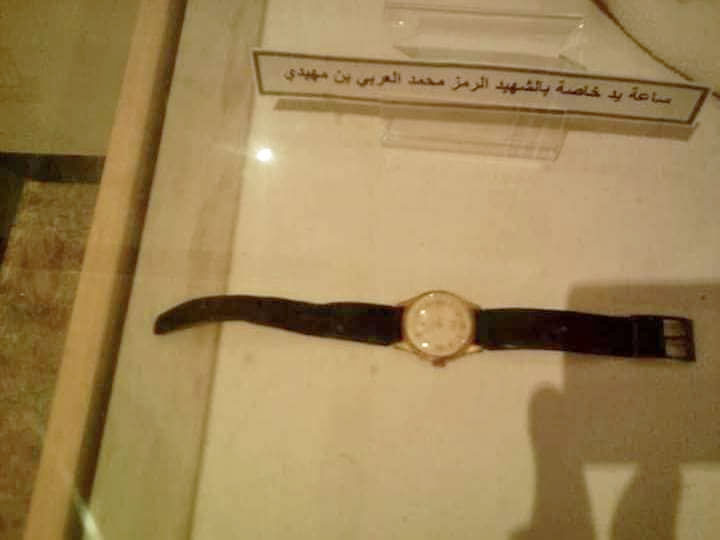
Larbi Ben M'hidi watch at the National Museum of Moujahid in Algiers

General Aussaresses admitted in 2000 that Ben M'hidi had been killed by the state, as had the lawyer Ali Boumendjel. General Bigeard said he had respect for Ben M'Hidi and that he regretted his death. Bigeard had declared himself 'sickened' by the news that French troops had assassinated Ben M'hidi. On 1 November 2024, Emmanuel Macron acknowledged France's responsibility for his assassination in 1957.

After Independence Rue d'Isly, one of the two main streets of Algiers was renamed Rue Larbi Ben M'hidi.

He was depicted in the movie The Battle of Algiers by Italian director Gillo Pontecorvo.

== Bibliography ==
- Horne, Alistair (2006). A Savage War of Peace: Algeria 1954-1962 (New York Review Books Classics). NYRB Classics. ISBN 978-1-59017-218-6
- Aussaresses, Paul (2010). The Battle of the Casbah: Terrorism and Counter-Terrorism in Algeria, 1955–1957. New York: Enigma Books. ISBN 978-1-929631-30-8
- Djebar, Assia (2001). Algerian White. Seven Stories Press. ISBN 978-1-58322-050-4
- Singer, Barnett; Langdon, John (2008). Cultured Force: Makers and Defenders of the French Colonial Empire. University of Wisconsin Press. ISBN 978-0-299-19904-3
