= Benyoucef Benkhedda =

Algerian politician (1920–2003)

- بن يوسف بن خدة
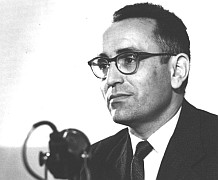
- Benkhedda in 1962

Head of the Provisional Government of the Algerian Republic
- In office 9 August 1961 – 27 September 1962
- Vice President: Krim Belkacem; Ahmed Ben Bella; Mohamed Boudiaf
- Preceded by: Ferhat Abbas
- Succeeded by: Ahmed ben Bella

Head of Government of Algeria
- In office 9 August 1961 – 27 September 1962
- President: Himself; Abderrahmane Farès
- Preceded by: Ferhat Abbas
- Succeeded by: Ahmed Ben Bella (as Prime Minister)

Personal details
- Born: February 23, 1920 Berrouaghia, Médéa Province, French Algeria
- Died: February 4, 2003 (aged 82) Algiers, Algeria
- Party: FLN
- Education: University of Algiers
- Occupation: Politician
- Profession: Pharmacist

Benyoucef Benkhedda (Arabic: بن يوسف بن خدة; February 23, 1920 – February 4, 2003) was an Algerian politician. He headed the third GPRA exile government of the National Liberation Front (FLN), acting as a leader during the Algerian War (1954–62). At the end of the war, he was briefly the de jure leader of the country, however he was quickly sidelined by more conservative figures.

== Early life ==
Benyoucef Benkhedda was born in 1920 in Berrouaghia, Médéa Province. The son of a Qadi, he attended both the local Madrasah and French colonial school. He later attended the Ibn Rochd lycée at Blida where he met Algerian nationalists such as Mohamed Lamine Debaghine, Saad Dahlab, Abane Ramdane, Ali Boumendjel and M'hamed Yazid. "You are the knives which we sharpen against France!" was the oft repeated cry of the college headmaster.

Having received his baccalauréat, he entered the University of Medicine and Pharmacy of Algiers in 1943, and after an interruption of his studies, obtained his degree in pharmacy in 1953. In 1942 he joined the Algerian People's Party (PPA) where he met pioneering nationalists such as Messali Hadj, Belkacem Radjef, Hocine Lahouel and many others. A year later he was arrested and detained by local SDECE agents for campaigning against conscription of Algerians in the war against Germany as part of the "unsubmissives of Blida". He was released eight months later.

== Algerian War ==
He was a member of the central committee of the PPA-MTLD in 1947 and served as the general secretary between 1951 and 1954. In November 1954 he was arrested again and released in May 1955, due to the intervention of French liberals (who included the Pied-Noir mayor of Algiers, Jacques Chevallier), when he joined the new National Liberation Front. He became an adviser to Abane Ramdane in Algiers. In August 1956 the Congress of Soummam appointed him a member of the Algerian National Revolutionary Council and the Committee of Action and Co-ordination of the Provisional Government of the Algerian Republic (GPRA) along with Abane, Dahlab Larbi Ben M'hidi, and Krim Belkacem. He, Abane and Ben M'hidi comprised the political and military triumvirate which directed the revolutionary Autonomous Zone of Algiers had become the capital of the resistance.

He and Abane were responsible for the creation of many projects such as the newspaper El Moudjahid, the creation of the General Union of Algerian Workers (UGTA) and the writing of Kassaman, which would become the national anthem of Algeria. He miraculously escaped capture by the paratroopers of General Jacques Massu by use of the sewer system of Algiers, fleeing the city after the capture of Ben M'hidi by paratroopers under Colonel Marcel Bigeard, Ben M'hidi was later killed while imprisoned by soldiers of Paul Aussaresses. He went abroad in the name of the Liberation front and accomplished much for the organisation such as visiting the capitals of the Arab states in 1957–58, London in 1959, Yugoslavia in 1961 where he attended the 1st Summit of the Non-Aligned Movement as a delegate representing a sovereign state, Latin America in 1960 and two visits to China. In a confidential letter to Richard Nolte, director of the Institute of Current World Affairs, Benkhedda is described as an "important terrorist commander" and "intellectual of Marxist formation".

On August 9, 1961 he was appointed the president of the provisional government and completed negotiations with France, which were started by Ferhat Abbas. A cease-fire was proclaimed the day before France officially recognised the national integrity of Algeria. He was welcomed as the country's leader by a jubilant Algerian population on July 3, 1962, the day that independence was recognised officially by France.

== Later political career ==
A crisis emerged later that month between the provisional government and Ahmed Ben Bella, supported by the 'Frontier Army' and Ben Khedda was forced to stand down to avoid a "fratricidal bloodbath". In 1976 he, with three leaders of the war of liberation (Ferhat Abbas, Hocine Lahouel, Kheir-Eddine) signed a proclamation which set about to create a constitutional national assembly, elected by universal suffrage to create a national charter (granted next year). The four signatories were placed under house arrest and had their property seized. He was released in 1979.

He wrote probably the most authoritative and accurate book about the twentieth century genesis of the Algerian movement for independence. "Les Origines du 1er Novembre 1954", Editions Dahlab, 1989.

Under the government of Chadli Bendjedid which claimed to be a multi-party system, also in 1989 he created 'El Oumma' with Abderahmane Kiouane and other friends from the liberation war. Its objective was the implementation of the Declaration of 1 November 1954, that is: "The sovereign and democratic independent Algerian State within Islamic principles".

The aim of 'El Oumma' was to work towards a coming together of the Islamist and Nationalist parties for an Islamic society. The president, Liamine Zeroual, who had succeeded Chadli promulgated a law prohibiting the use of the word "Islam" by the parties under penalty of dissolution. 'El Oumma' dissolved, unsuccessful, in 1997. At the same time he founded the 'Tadhamoune' with Sheikh Ahmed Sahnoune with the aim of denouncing the state because of serious human rights violations after the military coup of January 1992.

== Later life and popular recognition ==
He lived a quiet life for the rest of his days, running a pharmacy in Hydra, Algiers. After a long illness, Benyoucef Benkhedda died in his home in Algiers on February 4, 2003. A large crowd turned out for his funeral and he was buried at Sidi Yahia cemetery next to long-time companion Saad Dahlab. The University of Algiers was later named in his honour. He had three sons.

== Bibliography ==
- 1986 - Les Accords d'Evian - OPU, Algiers. ISBN 978-2-86600-244-2
- 1989 - Les origines du 1er novembre 1954 - ed. Dahlab, Algiers.
- 1997 - L'Algérie à l'indépendance: la crise de 1962 - Dahlab, Algiers. ISBN 978-9961-61-137-1
- 2000 - Abane-Ben M'hidi, leur apport à la révolution algérienne - ed. Dahlab, Algiers. ISBN 978-9961-61-098-5
- 2002 - Alger, capitale de la résistance 1956-1957 - ed. Houma, Algiers. ISBN 978-9961-66-599-2

== See also ==
- Algerian War of Independence
- National Liberation Front (Algeria)
- Abane Ramdane
- Ferhat Abbas
- Larbi Ben M'hidi

Political offices
| Preceded by Ferhat Abbas | Head of the Algerian Provisional Government; 1961-1962 | Succeeded by Abderrahmane Farès as President of the Provisional Executive Council |
