= Mohamed Lamine Debaghine =

Algerian politician and independence activist (1917–2003)

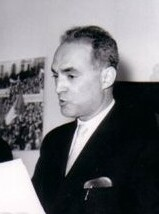

Chamber of Deputies of France (French Fourth Republic)

Member of Parliament for Constantine département (Algeria)
- In office 1945–1946
- In office 1946–1951

Minister of Foreign Affairs
- In office 1958–1960
- President: Ferhat Abbas
- Succeeded by: Krim Belkacem

Personal details
- Born: 24 January 1917 Hussein Dey, French Algeria
- Died: 23 January 2003 (aged 85) Algiers, Algeria
- Party: MTLD
- Education: Algiers University
- Profession: Physician
- Website: Biography on the website of the French National Assembly

Dr. Mohamed Lamine Debaghine (24 January 1917 in Hussein Dey, Algeria; – 23 January 2003 in Algiers, Algeria) was an Algerian politician and independence activist.

== Biography ==
Mohamed Lamine Debaghine, holding a doctorate of medicine from Algiers University, opened a medical practice in the eastern Constantine region in 1944. At the time, Algeria was a governorate of France, but with the exception of European settlers, Algerians were not accorded civil rights. He quickly became active in politics, and joined Messali Hadj's Parti du peuple algérien (PPA) leftist nationalist movement in 1939. During the Second World War, he was arrested by colonial authorities for nationalist agitation and for inciting Algerian conscripts to refuse military service in the French army (while also condemning Nazism). He emerged as one of the group's most important leaders, pushing for confrontation with the colonial authorities and demanding independence (as opposed to the more moderate followers of Ferhat Abbas, who, unlike the PPA, restricted their demands to full citizenship for Algerian Muslims and autonomous rule).

In 1946, Lamine Debaghine was elected to the French parliament as a deputy of Constantine on a list backed by the Movement for the Triumph of Democratic Liberties, a successor movement to the banned PPA. In parliament, he called for Algeria's independence and described France's annexation of the country in 1830 an "aggression", but otherwise stayed out of most parliamentary debates and votes (an exception being to vote against French membership in NATO in 1949).

In 1951, his parliamentary mandate ended, and three years later, an armed rebellion for Algeria's independence erupted led by the Front de libération nationale (FLN), a PPA/MTLD splinter group. In 1956, Lamine Debaghine was made a member of the FLN's exterior delegation (i.e. outside the country) and its shadow parliament, the CNRA, later CCE. Lamine Debaghine was elected minister of foreign affairs in the first lineup of the FLN's government-in-exile, GPRA, under Ferhat Abbas's presidency, holding the post for the period 1958–1960. In this role, he served as a primary spokesman of the FLN to the outside world, and worked to build alliances with the newly independent countries of the Arab world and other regions. However, being outside the country, he had limited authority over the actual armed rebellion of the FLN's armed wing, the Armée de libération nationale (ALN). A Time Magazine article from 1957 described him as Abbas's close collaborator, "Dr. Mohammed Lamine-Debaghine, 40, [the] bitterly anti-French veteran nationalist who is subject to bouts of depression caused by attacks of neuralgia that partially paralyze his face." As an ally of Abane Ramdane, he was later sidelined by Ramdane's rivals, including Ahmed Ben Bella and others, and he was excluded from the GPRA's two following ministerial lineups, as well as from any important role in post-independence politics.

Following the war, he reopened a medical practice in Sétif. He died in Algiers, the Algerian capital, on 23 January 2003, at the age of 85.
