= Omar Oussedik =

Algerian politician and independence leader

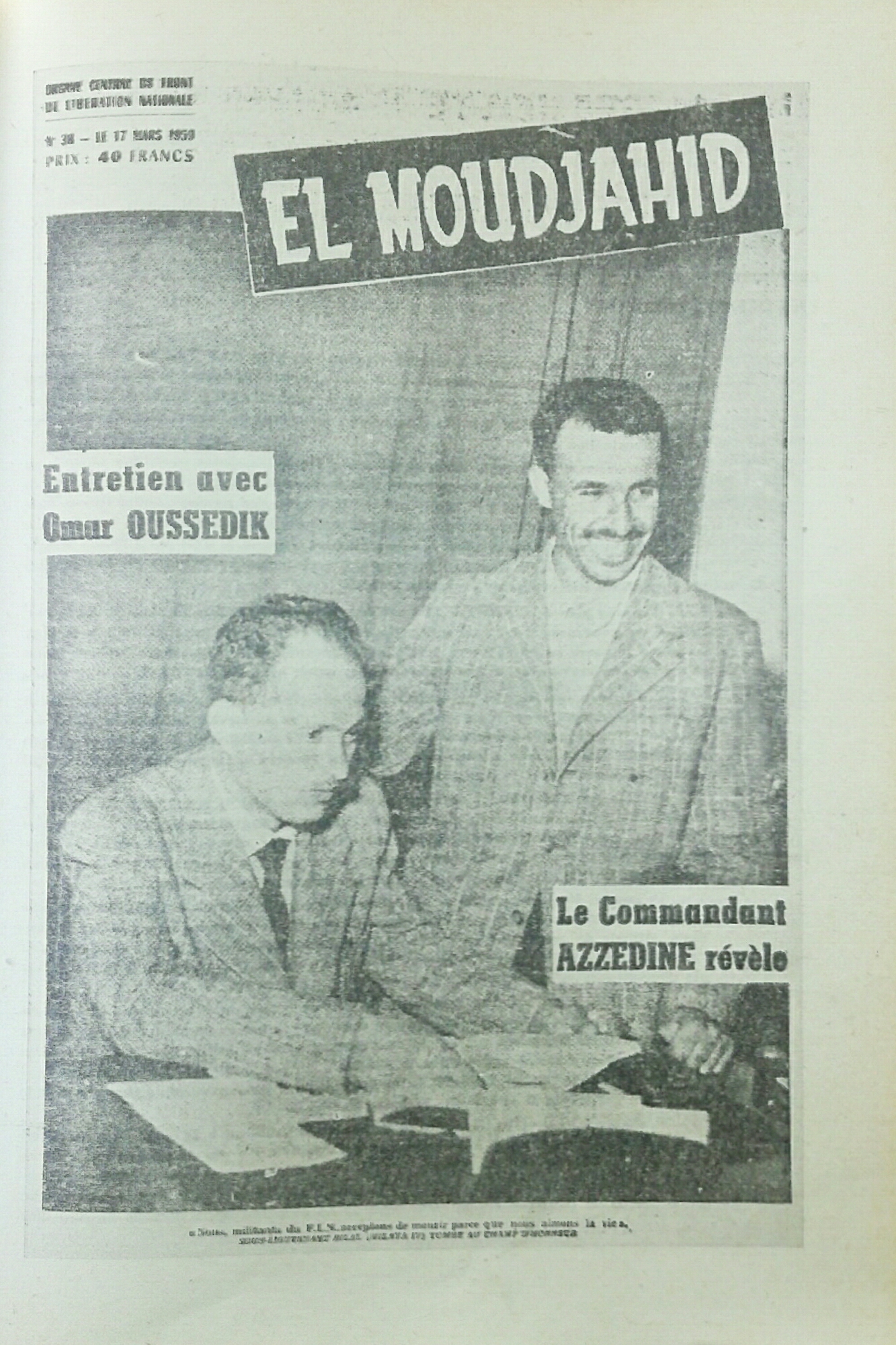
El Moudjahid Fr [38] - 17-03-1959 - Entretien with Omar Oussedik. the Commandant Azzedine révèle

Omar Oussedik (transliterated variously) (1920 or 1922 in Ain El Hammam, French Algeria – June 1992 in Algiers, Algeria) was an Algerian nationalist politician and independence leader, born in a Berber family from the Kabylie region.

At about age 22, he was drawn to the movement for Algerian self-rule and independence, joining the Parti du peuple algérien (PPA) headed by Messali Hadj. Following the Sétif massacre, he was among those who pushed for the formation of an armed clandestine network, the Organisation spéciale (OS). The OS was soon crushed by France, and in 1948 he was arrested by France and imprisoned in Blida military prison, where he was tortured. After being freed in 1951, he left to live in France, where he was active in the Algerian labor movement.

He returned to join the newly formed Front de libération nationale (FLN) in 1955, under the nom de guerre of Si Tayeb. During the Algerian War of Independence (1954–62), he held political missions such as a post in the provisional government in exile of the FLN, the Gouvernement provisoire de la République algérienne, (GPRA) between 1958 and 1960. He later worked as FLN representative in Guinea, which supported the Algerian revolt.

After independence in 1962, he served as ambassador of Algeria in the Soviet Union, Bulgaria, India and Italy, under then-foreign minister Abdelaziz Bouteflika. He died in 1992.
