= Polytechnic School of Architecture and Urbanism Hocine Aït Ahmed =

Algerian higher education institution

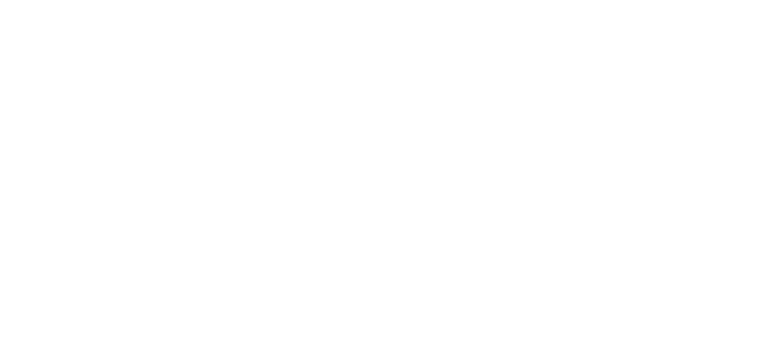
- Type: Public
- Established: 1970
- Academic affiliations: AUF
- Location: El Harrach, Algiers, Algeria; 36.71946°N 3.154°E
- Campus: Urban
- Website: www.epau-alger.edu.dz

The Polytechnic School of Architecture and Urbanism Hocine Aït Ahmed (EPAU) is a higher education institution located in the El Harrach municipality, east of Algiers, Algeria.

== History ==
The school was established in 1970. Its building was designed by Brazilian architect Oscar Niemeyer. In 2016, the EPAU was named after Hocine Aït Ahmed, a historic leader of the FLN.
