= Saïd Mohammedi =

Algerian freedom fighter and politician (1912–1994)

- Saɛid Muḥamadi
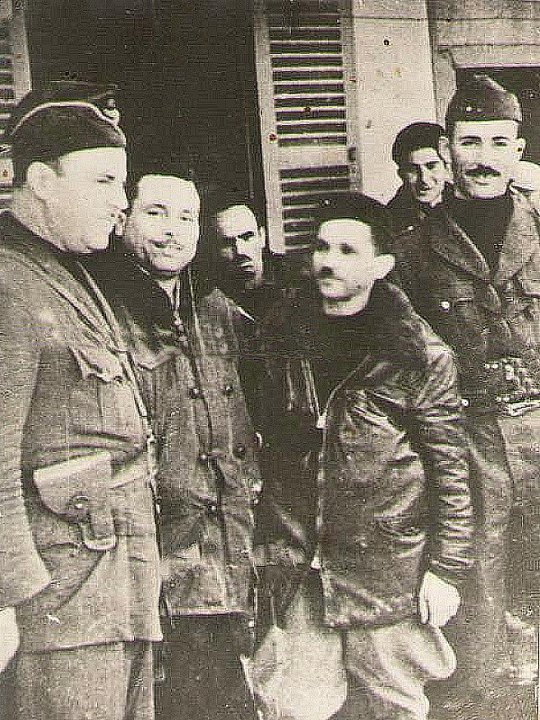
- Saïd Mohammedi (on the left) with other FLN militants.
- Born: December 27, 1912; Larbaâ Nath Irathen, Kabylia, French Algeria
- Died: 5 December 1994 (aged 81); Paris, France
- Other name: Si Nacer
- Political party: ENA; PPA; MTLD; FLN
- Movement: Algerian National Movement
- Military career
- Allegiance: France (1933); Nazi Germany (1944); Algeria (FLN) (1954–1962)
- Branch: French Army; Wehrmacht; Abwehr; National Liberation Army
- Rank: Lieutenant (Wehrmacht); Colonel (ALN)
- Conflicts: World War Two; Algerian War
- Awards: Iron Cross, First Class

Colonel Saïd Mohammedi (Kabyle: Saɛid Muḥamadi; 27 December 1912 – 6 December 1994), also known as Si Nacer, was an Algerian nationalist, soldier and politician.

== Early life and collaborationism ==
Born in the Berber Kabyle region of Tizi Ouzou, Saïd Mohammadi served in the French army. He became attracted to Algerian nationalism.

In the summer of 1944, along with five others (Algerians and Germans), Mohammedi was sent by the Abwehr on intelligence and sabotage missions to Algeria, but was arrested in the region of Tebessa and sentenced to death. Mohammedi's sentence was commuted to life in prison, and he was released from prison in 1952. He was known for always wearing his Wehrmacht steel helmet during Algerian War.

== FLN career ==
Saïd Mohammedi was an activist for the North African Star, the PPA and the MTLD. He made contact with the resistance as soon as he was released from prison in 1952.

In 1956, he participated in the Soummam congress with Krim Belkacem, of whom he was the first Deputy, to dissipate he became First Colonel of Wilaya III, with the commanders Amirouche Aït Hamouda, Abderrahmane Mira and Hamai Mohand Oukaci as deputy. He also became a member of the CNRA.

During the years 1957, elements of the MNA, supported by the French army, organized military actions against the ALN, eliminating soldiers and officers. In retaliation for these actions, Lieutenant Bariki organized an attack against the messalist centers considered to be counter revolutionary.

As Head of Wilaya III, he sends captain Mohand Arav Bessaoud to investigate first, then Commander Amirouche secondly, which again confirms Captain Mohand's report. Saïd said to assume the events of Melouza although he was not directly given the order.

Known for his mobilizing speeches, he successfully organized the troops and instilled in them rigor and the military spirit, thereby making Wilaya III the most powerful and best organized of the Wilayas. Fact which earned him to be chosen by his peers to create the Academy of senior officers in Cairo with a view to being appointed as the first general officer of the National Liberation Army (ALN); as a result, he was appointed by the Chief of Staff of the Provisional Government of the Algerian Republic. He thus took command of the ALN.

In 1957, he was appointed First Chief of the Military Organization Committee (COM) by the CCE. After a first reorganization, he was in charge of the COM Est, which brought together representatives of Wilaya I, II and III. During a second reorganization of the COM, he was appointed Minister of State of the GPRA, until the independence of Algeria.

== Post-independence career ==
Mohammedi was elected at the Congress of Tripoli to be a member of the Political Bureau, responsible for the Education and Public Health sector. Deputy of Tizi Ouzou on 20 September 1962, and he was appointed Minister of Former Mujahedin and War Victims in the first government of Ahmed Ben Bella. On 16 May 1963, he became 2nd vice-president of the Council, and member of the Central Committee and the Political Bureau of the FLN on 24 April 1964. He was dismissed by Ben Bella and lost his ministerial post during the reshuffle of 2 December 1964.

In 1965, he became a member of the Revolutionary Council, after Houari Boumédiène took power. In 1967, during the commemoration of the death of Amirouche Aït Hamouda in the village of Tassaft Ouguemoun, he gave a last meeting in which he denounced the autocratic policy of Boumédiène. He designated him by name as a despot and a dictator. The latter assigned him under house arrest for three years.

In the 1991 documentary The Algerian Years, Mohammedi detailed the activities of his soldiers who took part in the massacre of Melouza, against the messalists. At the end of his life, he was a supporter of the Islamic Salvation Front, which he saw as a popular movement capable of changing the regime in place.

He died on 5 December 1994 in Paris.
