= Stambouli =

Stambouli is a surname, meaning "from Istanbul". Notable people with the surname include:

- Benjamin Stambouli (born 1990), French footballer
- Elettra Stamboulis (born 1969), Italian curator, professor, writer, and comic writer
- Henri Stambouli (born 1961), French footballer
- Mustapha Stambouli (1920–1984), Algerian nationalist leader
