= Lamine Khene =

Algerian politician (1931–2020)

- لمين خان

Personal details
- Born: Abderrahman Khene; 6 July 1931
- Died: 14 December 2020 (aged 89)
- Party: PPA; MTLD; FLN

Military service
- Allegiance: FLN
- Branch/service: ALN
- Battles/wars: Algerian War

Abderrahman Khene (Note: Arabic: عبد الرحمن خان, romanized: ʿAbd ar-Raḥman Khān) (6 March 1931 – 14 December 2020), known as Lamine Khene (Note: Arabic: لمين خان, romanized: Lamīn Khān), was an Algerian nationalist politician, and officer.

== Life ==
At age 16, Khene joined the Algerian People's Party (PPA) and its successor organization, the MTLD. Later, he joined the National Liberation Front (FLN), to become an officer in its military wing, the National Liberation Army (ALN) during the Algerian War of Independence (1954–61), in which he fought as a guerrilla soldier from 1955. A medical student, in 1956, he was one of the co-founders of the Union générale des étudiants musulmans algériens (UGEMA), the FLN's student organization which later became the national student organization of Algeria.

Khene served as a secretary of state in the first lineup of the provisional exile government of the FLN, the Provisional Government of the Algerian Republic (GPRA) between 1958 and 1960.
