= Mhamed Yazid =

Algerian politician

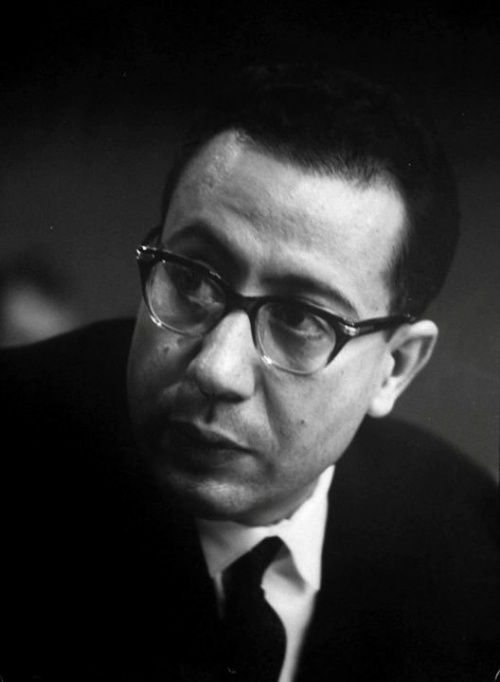
Mhamed Yazid

Mhamed Yazid (born in Blida, 1923–2003) was an Algerian independence activist and politician. He joined the nationalist Parti du Peuple Algérien (PPA) in 1942, and later, after moving to Paris, France for university studies, joined its successor organization, the MTLD, where he became a member of the central committee. He was arrested in 1948 and sentenced to two years of prison for "carrying suspicious documents". He later led hunger strikes in prison.

The PPA/MTLD leader Messali Hadj accused him of having too close ties to the French Communist Party (PCF), and after leading a mission to Cairo to hold talks with the exiled leadership of the rival nationalist movement, the Front de libération nationale (FLN), he defected to join that group as its New York City representative. He then served as minister of information in the FLN's government-in-exile (GPRA) set up in 1958, retaining his post through both cabinet reshuffles (in 1960 and 1961).

After independence in 1962, following an eight-year war, he was a member of the largely rubber-stamp parliament until 1965, when a military coup d'état led by Col. Houari Boumédiène shook up the system. Following this, he served in various diplomatic postings in the Arab world, and in bureaucratic and advising positions. He returned to party politics for a short stint as a member of the FLN's central committee in 1989, following the riots and general economic crisis that had struck the country.
