= Mustapha Stambouli =

Algerian nationalist leader (1920-1984)

Personal details
- Born: 10 March 1920 Mascara, French Algeria
- Died: 20 April 1984 (aged 64) Mascara, Algeria

Military service
- Allegiance: FLN
- Branch/service: ALN

Mustapha Stambouli (10 March 1920 – 20 April 1984) was an Algerian nationalist leader.

A law student, he was active for the nationalist cause from the late 1930s in the Parti du peuple algérien (PPA), and was jailed several times by the colonial authorities of France. In 1948, he was arrested on the Libyan border, as he tried to join Arab guerrillas in Palestine. He joined the Front de libération nationale (FLN), and served as an officer in its armed wing, the Armée de libération nationale (ALN), during the Algerian War of Independence (1954–62). He eventually became a secretary of state in the Gouvernement provisoire de la republique algérienne (GPRA), an exile government set up by the FLN. Following independence in 1962, he was elected to the constituent assembly, but played no major political role after that.

There is now a university named after him in his hometown of Mascara, Algeria.
