= Ahmed Francis =

Algerian politician

Ahmed Francis أحمد فرنسيس
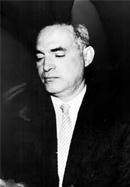

Politician

Personal details
- Born: 12 November 1910 Relizane, Algeria
- Died: 31 August 1968 (aged 57) Geneva, Switzerland
- Party: FLN

Military service
- Battles/wars: Algerian War

Ahmed Francis (12 November 1910 – 31 August 1968) was an Algerian politician and nationalist, born in Relizane in a family originally from Miliana.

After studying medicine in Paris, France, where he got his doctorate in 1939, Ahmed returned to Algeria and started working in 1942 in Setif, the city of his friend Ferhat Abbas, whom he followed during the political evolution.

He was the Minister of Economy and Finance of the first Algerian government from 1958 to 1963.

== Activism ==
Having begun his career as an activist in Paris at the AEMAN (Translated from French to: Association of Muslim Students of North Africa), he participated later in the creation of AML (Translated from French to: Friends of the Manifest of Freedom) before being interned afterwards in the events of May 8, 1945.

Ahmed Francis got involved with the movement for Algerian rights headed by his relative, the moderate nationalist, Ferhat Abbas. Like Abbas, he was arrested by colonial forces after the 1945 Sétif massacres, but later released. He then joined Abbas's UDMA movement, which demanded Algerian civil rights and full equality with non-Muslim French, but stopped short of independence from France. In 1946, he was elected member of the Constituent Assembly of France as a UDMA representative.

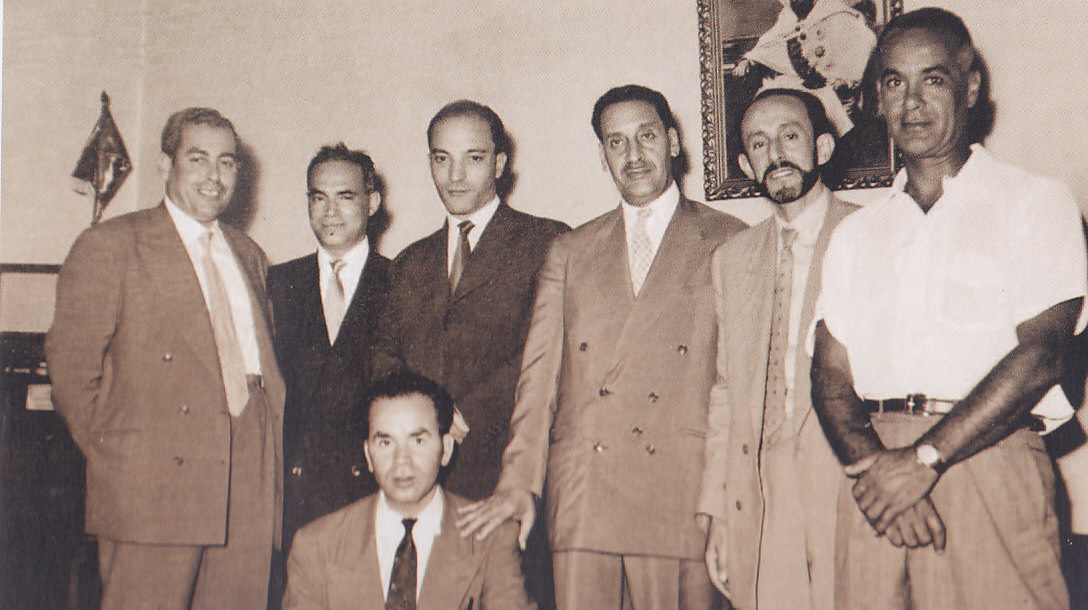
Standing from left to right: Ahmed Francis, Mohamed Lamine Debaghine, Abderrahmene Kiouane, Ferhat Abbas, Cheikh Omar Derdour, Mostefa Lakhak. Sitting: Mohamed El-Ghassiri.

Discouraged by increasing French political repression, he was eventually convinced to follow Abbas into exile in Cairo, to join the radical-nationalist Front de libération nationale (FLN) in 1956, two years after the FLN had begun an armed revolt for independence. He became a member of the Algerian government-in-exile, the GPRA, in the capacity of minister for economy and finances, arguably as something of a figurehead for more radical forces. As political infighting increased with independence approaching, he lost his place in the third (1961) ministerial lineup.

== Leadership ==
After independence, he briefly joined the military-backed government of president Ahmed Ben Bella, but resigned along with Abbas in protest of the one-party system set up and the marginalization of Algeria's constitutional assembly. He did not re-enter politics, and died in Geneva in 1968.

He joined the National Liberation Front (FLN) in Cairo in 1956 with Ferhat Abbas, and became an alternate member of the National Council of the Algerian Revolution (CNRA) following the Soummam congress. After several missions abroad, he became Minister of Economy and Finance of the first two Provisional Governments of the Algerian Republic (GPRA) from 1958 to 1961.

Ahmed Francis is one of the negotiators of the Evian accords, signed on March 18, 1962 in Evian-les-Bains (Haute-Savoie, France), between representatives of France and the GPRA during the Algerian war.

He returned to the front of the stage at independence by becoming deputy of Mostaganem of the Constituent Assembly. He became Minister of the Economy of Ahmed Ben Bella from September 27, 1962 to September 4, 1963. He withdrew from the political world and died in Geneva after a long illness in 1968.

== Sources ==
- Achour Cheurfi, La classe politique algérienne de 1900 à nos jours, dictionnaire biographique, 2001, Casbah éditions ISBN 978-9961-64-292-4
