= Mohamed Khider =

Algerian politician (1912–1967)

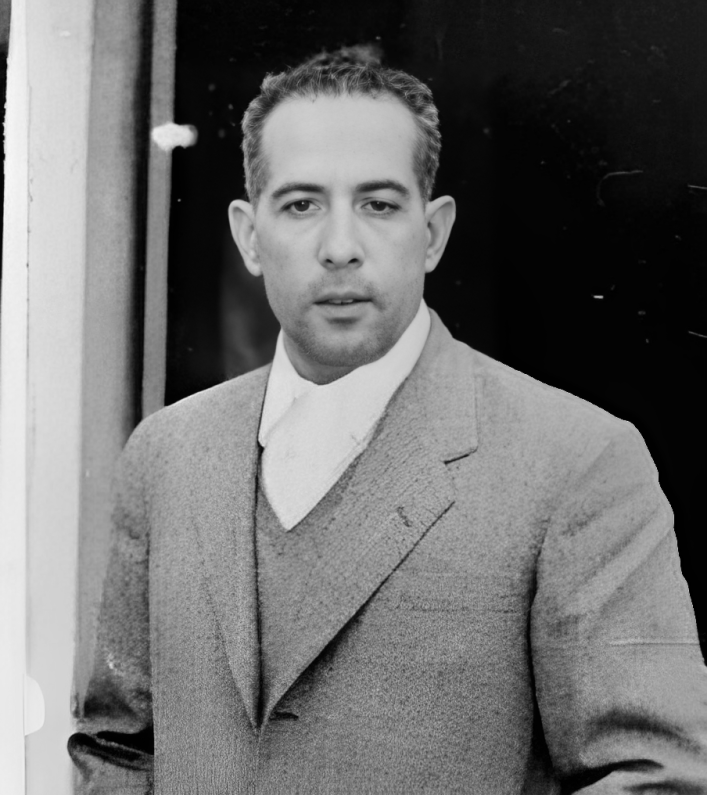
- Born: 13 March 1912; Biskra, Algeria
- Died: 4 January 1967 (aged 54); Madrid, Spain
- Cause of death: Ballistic trauma
- Burial place: Al-Shuhada, Casablanca
- Occupation: Politician
- Known for: Victim of unsolved murder

Mohamed Khider (Arabic: محمد خيضر; 13 March 1912 – 4 January 1967) was an Algerian politician and one of the early leaders of the FLN and its Comité Révolutionnaire d'Unité et d'Action (CRUA) founded and based in Cairo in March 1954. After the independence of Algeria in 1962, he first worked with President Ahmed Ben Bella, before turning against him and fleeing to France. He was assassinated by an unknown gunman in Madrid on 4 January 1967, while with his wife, Zahra Toudert.

== War years and imprisonment ==
Mohamed Khider was one of the original leaders of the Front de Libération nationale (FLN), having been previously active in its nationalist predecessors, the Étoile Nord-Africaine and Parti du Peuple Algerien (PPA) of Messali Hadj. From 1946 to 1951 he was a member of the French National Assembly as a representative of the Movement for the Triumph of Democratic Liberties (MTLD). He played an important role during the first years of the Algerian War of Independence (1954–62), mainly in representing the FLN externally. In 1956, he was part of a group of FLN politicians (Khider, Ahmad Ben Bella, Hocine Aït Ahmed, Mohamed Boudiaf and Rabah Bitat) captured by France in an airplane hijacking. Two years later, while incarcerated in France, he was an elected member of the GPRA exile government, holding the symbolical post of Minister of State. He was released as Algeria became independent in 1962.

== Backing and opposing Ben Bella ==
After returning to Algeria, Khider joined Ahmed Ben Bella and the FLN army's chief of staff, Col. Houari Boumédiène, in forming a Political Bureau of the FLN to replace the GPRA, over which they had no control. Boumédiène's army, built up outside the war zone in Morocco and Tunisia, quashed resistance among GPRA loyalists and guerrilla units inside Algeria, as it moved in from its border area bases.

Khider then took on the role of Secretary-General of the post-war Party of FLN, with control over finances, but quickly fell out with President Ben Bella. Among the causes were political differences, personal rivalries, and opposition to Ben Bella's increasingly autocratic rule. Ben Bella refused Khider's requests to allow the FLN into the decision-making process and replaced him as secretary-general.

== Personal life ==
Khider was married to Zahra Fetta Toudert (1930-2023). She was the sister of Bouchra, the spouse of Houcine Ait Ahmed (1926-2015). After his death, she lived in Egypt (1967-1975) and then Rabat, Morocco (1975-2023).

== Exile and death ==
In 1963, Khider went into exile in Switzerland, bringing $12 million (or $14 million) of party funds with him, saying they would be used to finance a political opposition to continue the "genuine" nationalist tradition of the FLN.

In 1967, he was assassinated in Madrid, Spain by an unknown gunman while with his wife. Most observers blamed his death on Col. Boumédiène, who had toppled Ben Bella two years earlier, and to whom Khider had declared his continued opposition. However, most prominent members of the OAS, the Pierre Lagaillarde gang, counting among its ranks embittered adversaries of the FLN such as Jean-Jacques Susini, Jean-Maurice Demarquet, Marcel Ronda, were all based in Spain at the time of his assassination.

Khider was buried in Casablanca and his funerals were attended by some Moroccan state dignitaries, including Mohamed Oufkir.

He was posthumously rehabilitated by Boumédiène's successor, Chadli Bendjedid, in 1984.

== See also ==
- List of unsolved murders
