= Mahmoud Cherif =

Algerian military leader and politician (1912–1987)

Colonel Mahmoud Cherif

Personal details
- Born: 1912 French Algeria
- Died: 1987 (aged 74–75)

Military service
- Branch/service: French Army; ALN
- Rank: Colonel
- Battles/wars: World War II; Algerian War

Colonel Mahmoud Chérif (1912 – 1987) was an Algerian military leader and politician. He was born in Chéria in the Tébessa governorship (wilaya) in 1912. After school, he joined the French Army and graduated from training courses with the rank of lieutenant. He participated as a French-Algerian soldier on the side of the Allies in the Second World War. After the war, he joined Ferhat Abbas's UDMA movement, which worked peacefully—but unsuccessfully—for Algerian rights. After the outbreak of the Algerian War of Independence in 1954, he joined the National Liberation Front (FLN) resistance movement, where his military command experience guaranteed him an important role. He headed the rebellion in FLN's Wilaya I, an area which included the Tébessa region, and was later promoted colonel in the National Liberation Army (ALN), FLN's armed wing. When the FLN created its government-in-exile (GPRA) in 1958, Chérif was made minister of armament and materiel under Abbas's presidency, until a 1960 reshuffle.

== Sources ==
- 1 Novémbre Website (archived) (in French)
- Liste des membres du 1er GPRA 1958/1960 (archived) (in French)
