= Provisional Government of the Algerian Republic =

1958–1962 government-in-exile of the National Liberation Front

Algerian Republic الجمهورية الجزائرية (Arabic) al-Jumhūriyyah al-Jazāʾiriyyah République algérienne (French)
- 1958–1962
- Flag (1958–1962) Emblem
- Anthem: قَسَمًا; Qasaman "We Pledge"
- Capital: Algiers (de jure until 1962)
- Capital-in-exile: Cairo (1958–1960); Tunis (1960–1962)
- Common languages: Arabic; French
- Government: Government in exile
- President
  - 1958–1961: Ferhat Abbas
  - 1961–1962: Benyoucef Benkhedda
- Historical era: Decolonization of Africa
  - Beginning of Algerian War: 1 November 1954
  - GPRA proclaimed: 19 September 1958
  - Évian Accords: 19 March 1962
  - GPRA seated in Algiers: 1 July 1962
  - Independence proclaimed: 5 July 1962
  - People's Democratic Republic of Algeria established: 25 September 1962
Preceded by	Succeeded by
French Algeria	Algeria

The Provisional Government of the Algerian Republic (Arabic: الحكومة المؤقتة للجمهورية الجزائرية, ح م ج ج; French: Gouvernement provisoire de la République algérienne, GPRA) was the government-in-exile of the Algerian National Liberation Front (FLN) during the latter part of the Algerian War of Independence (1954–1962).

== Creation and purpose ==
The GPRA was set up in Cairo, Egypt, by the FLN on September 19, 1958, four years into the Algerian War of Independence. Its first President was the moderate nationalist Ferhat Abbas, who had for decades insisted on trying to peacefully reform the French colonial system, before finally despairing and joining the FLN's armed struggle. He was once re-elected to the post, in 1960, but as early as the following year he was sidelined and replaced by Benyoucef Benkhedda, who held the presidency as Algeria was declared independent.

The purpose of the GPRA was to serve as a diplomatic and political tool for the FLN. It allowed sympathetic governments to extend official recognition to it (among those that did were neighbouring Morocco and Tunisia, as well as Nasserite Egypt, other Arab countries, and Pakistan). Its headquarters were located in Tunis, but diplomats were posted in most major world capitals to try to lobby governments and organize local support groups. It was partly intended to serve as a preemptive diplomatic strike against a proposal by French President Charles de Gaulle to hold a referendum by which Algeria would be given an autonomous status within France.

== 1962 Algerian crisis ==
After the war, the Algerian crisis period began and infighting broke out in FLN ranks. Benkhedda of the GPRA briefly held power in Tizi Ouzou, but there was no unified power for the whole country. Ahmed Ben Bella entered Algeria with the National Liberation Army (ALN) and established his headquarters in Tlemcen in July. By 9 September, the ALN entered Algiers and Ben Bella declared that the crisis ended. In late 1962, the GPRA was disbanded, after Ahmed Ben Bella seized power through forming a rival institution (a Political Bureau of the FLN) with the backing of the National Liberation Army (ALN), controlled by Col. Houari Boumédiène. An attempt by GPRA politicians and loyal guerrilla units to resist the military-backed takeover was crushed in a short but intense burst of internal fighting. A compromise forced by Boumédiène saw most of the provisional government enter an expanded Political Bureau, and the GPRA itself was dissolved. A one-party state under Ben Bella's command was then set up, after a constitution had been approved in elections by 99.6% of voters for the new republic.

While some argue that this broke the institutional continuity between the war-time GPRA and the present Algerian state, the Algerian presidency and government is still normally regarded as the GPRA's post-independence successor.

== List of members of the GPRA ==
The GPRA was reformed twice, in 1960 and 1961, with the change of ministers and portfolios to some extent reflecting the shifts of power within the FLN. Below is a list of the three versions of the GPRA.

=== The first GPRA: 1958–60 ===
- Ferhat Abbas – President
- Colonel Krim Belkacem – Vice President and Minister of the Armed Forces
- Ahmed Ben Bella – Minister of State
- Hocine Aït Ahmed – Minister of State
- Rabah Bitat – Minister of State
- Mohamed Boudiaf – Minister of State
- Mohamed Khider – Minister of State
- Mohamed Lamine Debaghine – Minister of Foreign Affairs
- Mahmoud Cherif – Minister of Armaments and Provisions
- Lakhdar Ben Tobbal – Minister of the Interior
- Abdelhafid Boussouf – Minister of General Relations and Communications
- Abdelhamid Mehri – Minister of Maghreb Affairs
- Ahmed Francis – Minister of Economic and Financial Affairs
- Mhamed Yazid – Minister of Information
- Benyoucef Benkhedda – Minister of Social Affairs
- Ahmed Tewfik El Madani – Minister of Cultural Affairs

==== Ministerial reshuffle at 15 March 1959 ====
- Lamine Khene – Secretary of State
- Omar Oussedik – Secretary of State
- Mustapha Stambouli

=== The second GPRA: 1960–61 ===
- Ferhat Abbas – President
- Colonel Krim Belkacem – Vice President, and Minister of Foreign Affairs
- Ahmed Ben Bella – Minister of State
- Hocine Aït Ahmed – Minister of State
- Rabah Bitat – Minister of State
- Mohamed Boudiaf – Minister of State
- Mohamed Khider – Minister of State
- Colonel Saïd Mohammedi – Minister of State
- Abdelhamid Mehri – Minister of Social and Cultural Affairs
- Abdelhafid Boussouf – Minister of Armaments and of General Relations
- Ahmed Francis – Minister of Economic and Financial Affairs
- Mhamed Yazid – Minister of Information
- Lakhdar Ben Tobbal – Minister of the Interior

=== The third GPRA: 1961–62 ===
- Benyoucef Benkhedda – President, and Minister of Economic and Financial Affairs
- Colonel Krim Belkacem – Vice President, Minister of the Interior of Foreign Affairs
- Ahmed Ben Bella – Vice President
- Mohamed Boudiaf – Vice President
- Hocine Aït Ahmed – Minister of State
- Rabah Bitat – Minister of State
- Mohamed Khider – Minister of State
- Lakhdar Ben Tobbal – Minister of State
- Colonel Saïd Mohammedi – Minister of State
- Saad Dahlab – Minister of Foreign Affairs
- Abdelhafid Boussouf – Minister of Armamaments and of General Relations
- Mhamed Yazid – Minister of Information

== Literature ==
- Achour Cheurfi, La classe politique algérienne, de 1900 à nos jours. Dictionnaire biographique (Casbah Editions, 2nd edition, Algiers 2006)
- Jacques Duchemin, Histoire du F. L. N. (Editions Mimouni, Algiers 2006)
- Alistair Horne, A Savage War of Peace: Algeria, 1954-1962 (Viking 1977)
- McDougall, James, A History of Algeria (Cambridge University Press 2017)
- McDougall, James, History and the culture of nationalism in Algeria (Cambridge University Press 2006)
- Benjamin Stora, Algeria. 1830-2000. A Short History (Cornell University Press, United States 2004)
