= Abane Ramdane =

Algerian political activist and revolutionary

Ramdane Abane
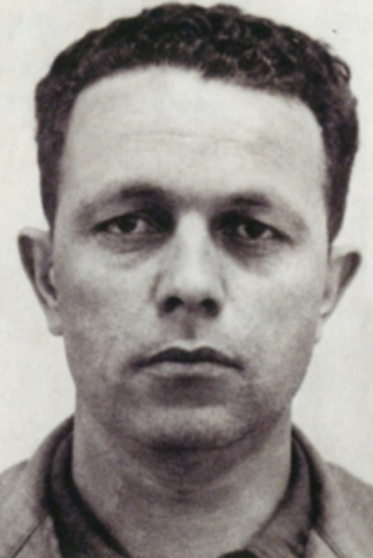
- Born: Ramdane Abane; 10 June 1920; Azouza, French Algeria (now Algeria)
- Died: 26 December 1957 (aged 37); Tétouan, Morocco
- Cause of death: Summary execution
- Known for: National Liberation Front; National Liberation Army; Algerian War; Soummam conference; Battle of Algiers
- Movement: FLN, ALN
- Spouse: Izza Bouzekri

Abane Ramdane (Arabic: عبان رمضان; Kabyle: Remḍan Ɛebban; June 10, 1920 – December 26, 1957) was an Algerian political activist and revolutionary. He played a key role in the organization of the independence struggle during the Algerian war. His influence was so great that he was known as "the architect of the revolution". He was also the architect of the Soummam conference in Béjaïa in 1956 and was very close to Frantz Fanon.

In the spring of 1957, rifts developed between Ramdane and other major figureheads in the National Liberation Front (FLN). At the time, there was an internal struggle between the military and civil factions in the FLN, and Ramdane was accused of creating a "cult of personality".

On December 24, 1957, Ramdane was instructed to travel to Tétouan, Morocco, with Krim Belkacem and Mahmoud Cherif to meet with King Mohammed V. They arrived on December 26. Once in the country, Abdelhafid Boussouf, member of Oujda Group, picked them up in a car. While the exact nature of Ramdane's death is unknown, and contesting stories were told by those involved, Ramdane was killed.

Ramdane was "super-political", and his murder was disturbing to many FLN members including a member of Oujda Group, Houari Boumediene, who, according to the 1977 book by Alistair Horne, A Savage War of Peace: Algeria 1954–1962, would keep the assassins out of his Algerian government when he was the Algerian president.

Abane Ramdane turned his back on the "external" colonels of the Algerian revolution, including Boumediene and Boussouf, in agreement with Ben Bella they prepared a CNRA (national council of the Algerian revolution) which planned to reverse the achievements of the Soummam congress. Abane accused them of being "palace revolutionaries" far from the field and the internal maquis and preoccupied by power. In December 1957, under the pretext of requesting his help to resolve a conflict in Morocco, he was lured into a trap where he was assassinated by Boussouf and his services.

A few years after independence, Ramdane was reburied in his native village of Azouza, in Tizi Ouzou Province.
