= Lakhdar Ben Tobbal =

Algerian resistance fighter (1923–2010)

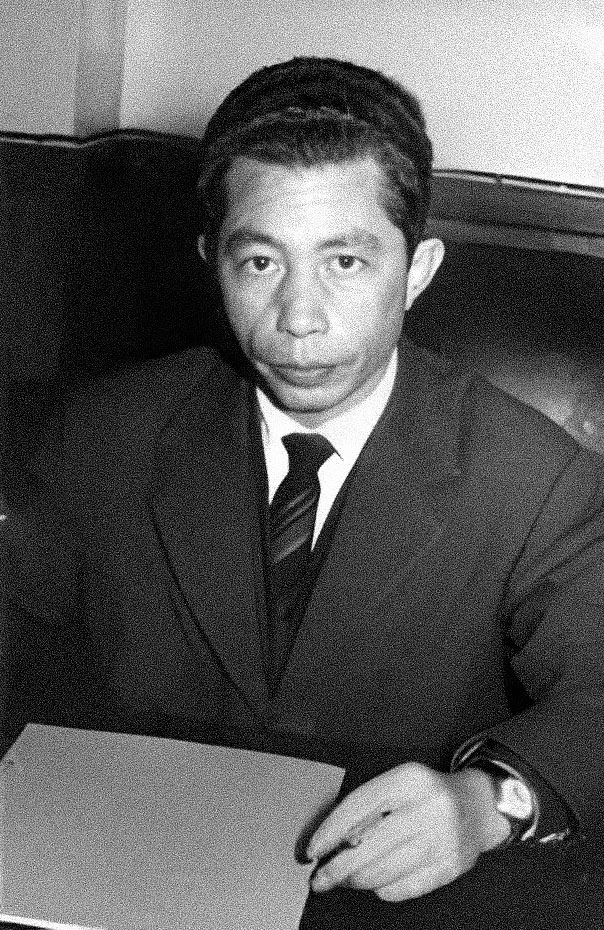
Lakhdar Bentobal

Slimane Bentebal (1923, Mila, Algeria – 21 August 2010), better known as Lakhdar Bentobal, is a former Algerian resistance fighter.

== Biography ==
Lakhdar Bentobal was a member of the nationalist Parti du peuple Algérien (PPA), and later moved on to its paramilitary organization (Organisation spéciale, OS) which became the embryo of the Front de libération nationale (FLN). He was one of the original "historical leaders" of the FLN's 1 November 1954 uprising against French colonialism.

A top leader of the FLN's interior armed action in the 1954-62 Algerian war of independence. He was a member of all three issues of the FLN's exile government, the GPRA, in various ministerial capacities. He was a key participant at the negotiations of Evian who insisted on the integrity of the entire Algerian territory including the Sahara and its resources. On independence in 1962, he opposed the victorious military-backed takeover of Ahmed Ben Bella, and was arrested. On his release, he left politics, and spent the remainder of his career in various non-political administrative and business posts.

== Personal life ==
Ben Tobbal was of Turkish origin.
