= Café Wars =

Conflict during the Algerian War

- Part of the Algerian War
Location	Metropolitan France
Result	FLN dominate Algerian independence movement.

Belligerents
Front de Libération Nationale	Mouvement National Algérien

Casualties and losses
- Official French figure of 3,975 dead

The Café Wars took place during the Algerian War, as a part of the internal fighting in France between two rival Algerian nationalist movements, the Mouvement National Algérien and the Front de Libération National (which later became the ruling political party in independent Algeria).

The Café Wars are so called because part of the fighting took the form of bomb attacks and assassinations in cafés, directed at supporters of the other party, as they struggled for control and influence over the large Algerian expatriate community and its organizations. Since both organizations operated underground, and were wanted by the French government, the line between a military and a civilian target was hard to draw, and often wilfully disregarded by the combatants. Groups from both the MNA and the FLN resorted to gangland-style killings, intimidation and the murder of civilians to pursue their political goals and secure finances and influence. This led to the Café Wars being portrayed in France as acts of random terrorism, and conflated with attacks on French settlers in Algeria.

According to some estimates the Café Wars cost an estimated 5,000 lives. The official French figures are 3,975 dead and a total of 10,223 victims (dead or wounded).

The Café Wars did not end before Algeria achieved independence in 1962, by the government of Charles de Gaulle. The FLN had by then routed the MNA's guerrilla units in Algeria, and for all practical purposes destroyed its organization in France.

== See also ==
- Zohra Drif
