= Krim Belkacem =

Algerian revolutionary fighter and politician (1922–1970)

- Belqasem Krim
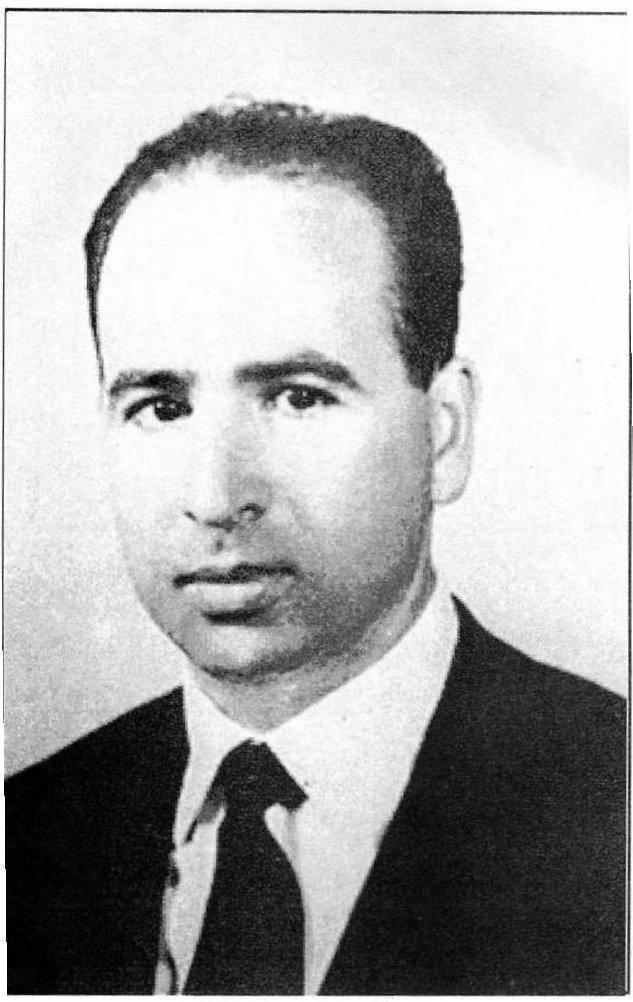
- Photo of Krim Belkacem, c. 1945
- Born: 14 September 1922; Tizi Ouzou, French Algeria
- Died: 18 October 1970 (aged 48); Frankfurt, West Germany
- Other name: Si Rabah
- Known for: Algerian War, Évian Accords

Krim Belkacem (Kabyle: Belqasem Krim, Arabic: كريم بلقاسم; 14 September 1922 – 18 October 1970) was an Algerian revolutionary and politician who was a notable figure during the Algerian War. As vice-president of the GPRA, he was the sole signatory of the Évian Accords on the Algerian side. After the 1965 coup d'état, he went into exile and was assassinated in West Germany in 1970.

== Biography ==
Krim was born in the village of Aït Yahia Moussa (now in Tizi Ouzou Province) in the Kabylie region of Algeria. During the Second World War, he joined the French Army, and was promoted corporal in the First Algerian Sharpshooter Regiment, reputedly becoming an excellent shot. Demobilized on 4 October 1945, he returned to his home village, where he took up a bureaucratic post. Krim joined the underground Algerian People's Party at the beginning of 1946, setting up clandestine cells in 12 villages around Draa el-Mizan. Accused of the murder of a forest warden in 1947, he was hunted and he joined the maquis under the Pseudonym of Si Rabah with Moh Nachid, Mohand Talah and Messaoud Ben Arab. Twice sentenced to death by French tribunals in 1947 and 1950, he became the Kabylie responsible of the PPA-MTLD paramilitary organization founded in February 1947 by Messali Hadj, the Organisation spéciale, at the head of 22 members of the resistance (maquisards).

During the Algerian War of Independence, Krim was chief of the FLN's 3rd Wilaya, Kabylie and its surrounding area. After his important role at the Soummam Congress—in which the FLN formalized its revolutionary program—Krim became one of the most important and powerful of all the FLN chiefs. He was the first to be Minister of Defense, then Foreign Minister, in the provisional Government of the Algerian republic (GPRA) in 1958, and Vice President of Algeria. Later he was the principal Algerian negotiator of the agreements of Évian in March 1962. Belkacem was in opposition to the creation of the Political Bureau of the FLN in July 1962 by Ahmed Ben Bella, Houari Boumédiène, and Mohamed Khider.

== Political views and assassination ==
After the coup d'état of 19 June 1965, he returned to the opposition. Accused of having organized an attack against Boumediene in April 1967, manipulated and betrayed by part of his entourage, he was sentenced to death in absentia.

According to his daughter Karima, in an interview with El Moudjahid on 25 March 1998, Belkacem definitively gave up politics and went into exile in August 1967: "On 4 August 1967," she says, "he and the family hastily packed some effects into the family Volkswagen and drove all night to Morocco. The next day, he was sentenced in absentia." On 17 October 1967, he created with friends including Slimane Amirat, Colonels Amar Ouamrane and Mohand Oulhadj, the Movement for the Defense of the Algerian Revolution (MDRA), an underground party intended to fight against the Boumediene regime.

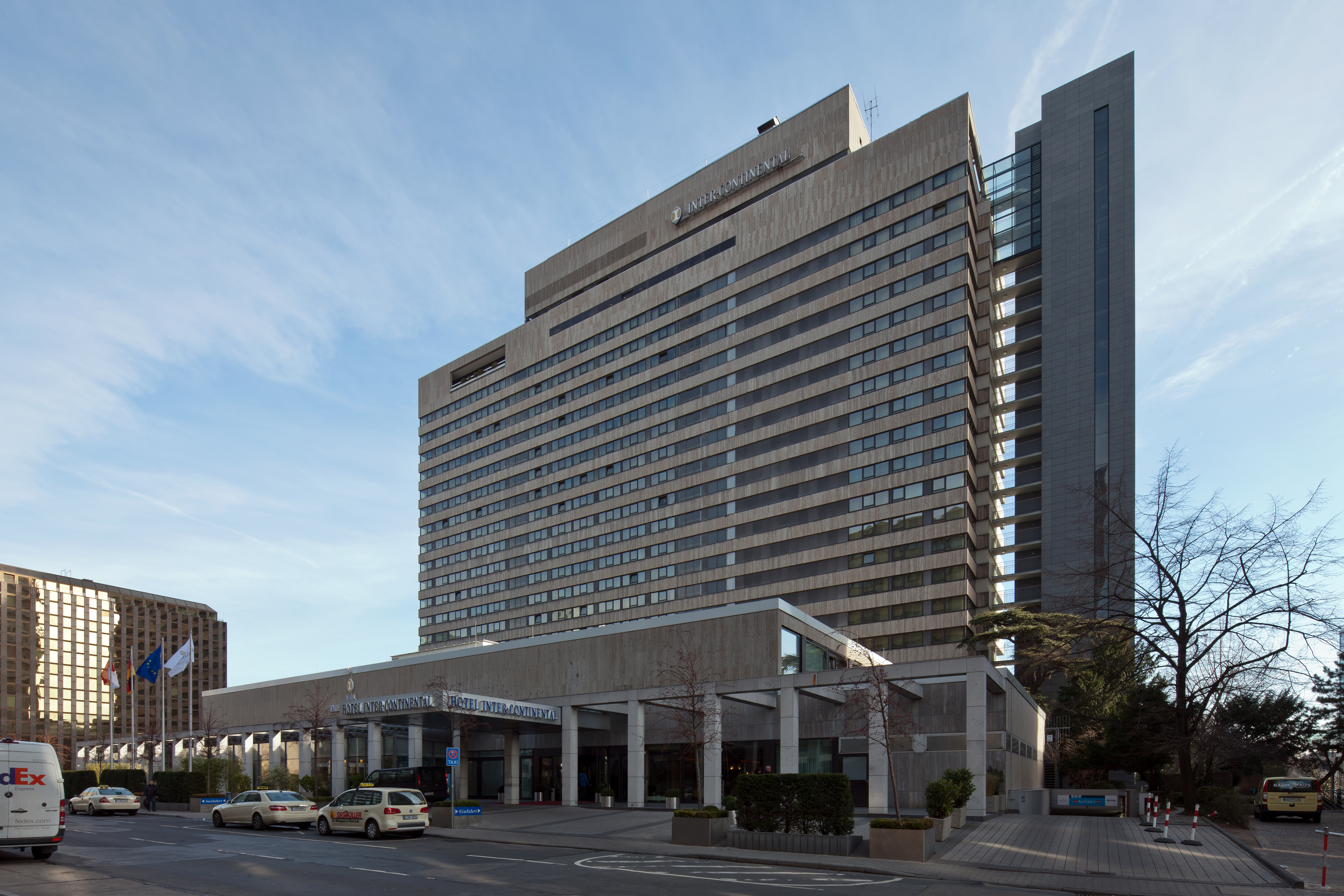
InterContinental Hotel in 2012

Two years later, on 18 October 1970, he was found strangled with his tie in a room at the Inter-Continental Hotel in Frankfurt, presumably by Algerian military security agents.

== See also ==
- Algerian war
- List of assassinated people
