= Hocine Aït Ahmed =

Algerian politician (1926–2015)

Hocine Aït Ahmed Ḥusin At Ḥmed
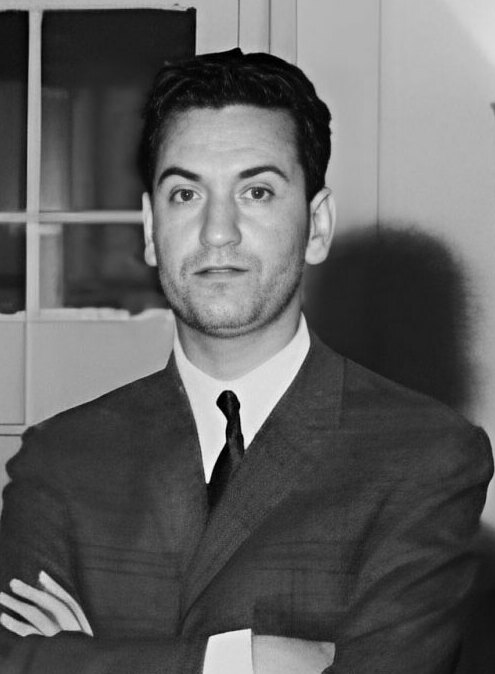
- Born: 20 August 1926; Ain El Hammam, French Algeria (present-day Algeria)
- Died: 23 December 2015 (aged 89); Lausanne, Switzerland
- Known for: Founder and vanguard leader of historic opposition in Algeria
- Movement: FLN, CRUA, OS, FFS
- Spouse: Djamila Aït Ahmed née Toudert (before 2015)
- Children: 3
- Military career
- Allegiance: FLN; Socialist Forces Front
- Service years: 1954–1956; 1963–1964
- Conflicts: Algerian War; Socialist Forces Front rebellion in Algeria

Hocine Aït Ahmed (Kabyle: Ḥusin At Ḥmed; Arabic: حسين آيت أحمد, romanized: Ḥusayn Ayt Aḥmad; 20 August 1926 – 23 December 2015) was an Algerian politician and former rebel leader who was the founder and leader of the Socialist Forces Front (FFS), the historical political opposition in Algeria, which he served as the organization's leader until 2009.

The Hocine Aït Ahmed Stadium, one of the largest stadiums by capacity in Algeria, is named after him.

== Life ==
Aït Ahmed was born in Aït Yahia in 1926.

He was one of the main leaders of the National Liberation Front (FLN) in the Algerian War, and was arrested in October 1956 along with Ahmed Ben Bella, Mohamed Boudiaf, Mostefa Lacheraf, and Mohamed Khider after France hijacked a Moroccan aeroplane destined for Tunisia that had the FLN leaders onboard, directing it to occupied Algiers.

After the Algerian War, Aït Ahmed resigned from the Provisional Government of the Algerian Republic (GPRA) and all the organs of the new power during the crisis of the summer of 1962. In September 1963, he founded the Socialist Forces Front (FFS), which sought political pluralism in political life within the single-party system.

He was arrested and sentenced to death in 1964, before escaping from the El Harrach prison on 1st May 1966.

Exiled in Switzerland, he graduated with a doctorate in law.

Following the riots of October 1988, President Chadli Bendjedid proposed a new constitution calling for political pluralism in Algeria, and as part of this, Aït Ahmed was invited to return to the country.

He returned in December 1989 as the head of the FFS, but left again after the assassination of President Mohamed Boudiaf, in June 1992. In the years following the end of the Algerian Civil War, he repeatedly visited Algeria, including to commemorate the 50th anniversary of the start of the Algerian War of Independence in 2004.

Aït Ahmed died at the age of 89 in Lausanne, Switzerland, on 23rd December 2015.
