= Ferhat Abbas =

Algerian pharmacist, writer and politician (1899–1985)

Ferhat Abbas فرحات عباس
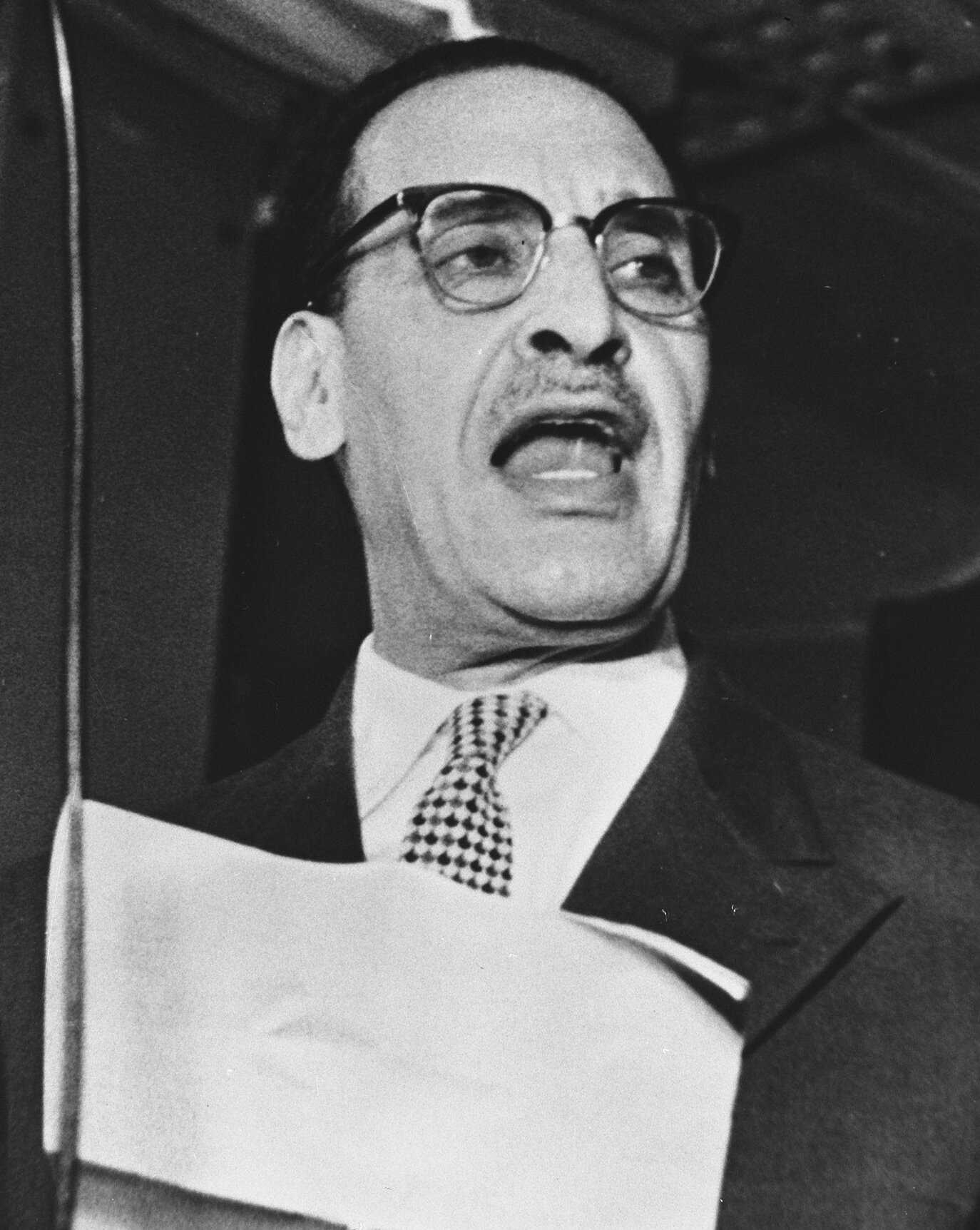
- Abbas in 1959

President of the People's National Assembly
- In office 25 September 1962 – 15 September 1963
- Preceded by: Position Established
- Succeeded by: Hadj Mohamed Benalla

President of the Provisional Government of the Algerian Republic
- In office 19 September 1958 – 9 August 1961
- Vice President: Krim Belkacem
- Preceded by: None
- Succeeded by: Benyoucef Benkhedda

Member of the French Constituent Assembly
- In office 1946–1955

Personal details
- Born: 24 August 1899 Taher, Algeria
- Died: 24 December 1985 (aged 86) Algiers, Algeria
- Party: FLN

Military service
- Allegiance: Algeria
- Branch/service: French Army
- Years of service: 1936–1938, 1940–1943
- Unit: Medical Corps
- Battles/wars: World War II

Ferhat Abbas (Arabic: فرحات عباس; ALA-LC: Farḥāt ʿAbbās; 24 August 1899 – 24 December 1985) (Note: Some sources state that the date of his birth was 24 October 1899.) was an Algerian politician who acted in a provisional capacity as the then yet-to-become independent country's Prime Minister from 1958 to 1961, as well as the first President of the National Assembly and the first acting Chief of State after independence.

An influential figure in the Young Algerians, Abbas initially advocated for equal political rights for Algerian Muslims in France and for the granting of French citizenship for Algerian Muslims. Over time, he became a revolutionary Algerian nationalist.

== Background ==
The son of a caid, Said Ben Ahmed Abbas and Achoura (Maza) Abbas, Ferhat Abbas was born in the village of Taher, Algeria. In addition to being a caid in the village of Chahna, his father had also been awarded the rosette and silver braid of a commander of the Legion of Honor.

The young Abbas was educated first at Phillipeville (now called Skikda), Constantine, where he received his baccalaureate. Before finishing his education, he was required to serve in the French army medical corps where he reached the rank of sergeant. Abbas then attended the pharmacy school at the University of Algiers. After graduating, Abbas worked as a pharmacist in Sétif, where he became involved in politics. There he was elected to the municipal council and then to the general council of Constantine.

During this period Abbas was pro-French in his outlook, as illustrated by such writings as an article dated 1936 titled "I am France". However Abbas became disillusioned with France, during 1938, when his aspirations for equality showed no sign of being achieved. He accordingly organized the Algerian Popular Union (Union Populaire Algerienne). This organization promoted equal rights for both French and Algerians whilst maintaining Algerian culture and language as primary values.

With the outbreak of World War II, Abbas volunteered to rejoin the medical corps of the French Army. After his service, his political views continued to evolve and he turned away from France after General Giraud refused his requests to allow Muslims to enlist in their fight against the occupying forces as equals. His desire for change continued and he turned to nationalism, issuing the Manifesto of the Algerian People on February 10, 1943. The manifesto made apparent the philosophical changes that Abbas had undergone. He now condemned colonial rule by the French and demanded Algerian self-determination. Abbas argued the need for an Algerian constitution, which would grant equality to all Algerians. In May he, along with some colleagues, added a clause foreseeing a sovereign Algeria. The manifesto was published on June 26, but was rejected by the governor general. He, along with Messali Hadj form the Amis du Manifeste et de la Liberté (Note: This translates as "Friends of the Manifesto and Liberty".), and called for an autonomous republic. This initiative resulted in Abbas being imprisoned for a year, and the quick dissolution of the AML. In 1946, Abbas formed the nationalist political party Union Démocratique du Manifeste Algérien (UDMA) (Note: Translated to Democratic Union of the Algerian Manifesto.) when he was elected member of the Constituent Assembly of France. This new organization called for a more moderate approach, such as the formation of an Algerian state with the full cooperation of France. 1946 also saw him named as editor of the publication Egalité. He remained active in politics as a member of the Algerian Assembly through 1955. During these years he was arrested twice. His continuing efforts as a moderate nationalist did not succeed and he fled to Cairo, in 1956. While in Cairo, he worked alongside Ahmed Ben Bella, a fellow revolutionary.

== Involvement with FLN ==
As he was opposed to violence, Ferhat kept himself distant from the Algerian War, and continued to try to act as an intermediary to the opposing sides. However, after the French government intensified the war, in 1956, Ferhat joined the Front de Libération Nationale (FLN). His diplomatic skills were utilized by the FLN, as he was sent on missions sponsored by their ally, President Habib Bourguiba of Tunisia. His visits through Latin America, Europe, and the Middle East were intended to drum up support for their cause. In 1957, he was appointed as the FLN delegate to the United Nations. In 1958, he attended the North African Conference in Tunis, and in March, he communicated an appeal to the Vatican for their assistance in creating peace. After the collapse of the Fourth Republic and the coming to power of Charles de Gaulle, the hopes for an independent Algeria increased. This however did not end the fighting and on September 18 (Note: Some sources give the 19th of September as the date.) of that year, the Provisional Government of the Algerian Republic (GPRA) was created. His political standing in Algeria and reputation as a moderate nationalist, acceptable to the West, helped him become president of this provisional Algerian nationalist government-in-exile on September 18, 1958, when it was created. The position of President was largely as a figurehead and a diplomat, as most of the power was wielded by the cabinet; however in time a number of Asian and African nations recognized the government. In October 1958, an attempt was made by both Abbas and de Gaulle at ending the war with a meeting and intended cease-fire, but it was dashed by the inability of the parties to agree on a neutral location. By September 16, 1959, de Gaulle was softening as he offered self-determination to be decided by a referendum four years after a cease-fire. This plan was generally accepted; unfortunately, there were a few substantial sticking points. By 1960, Abbas was becoming frustrated with the West as he lashed out at the United Kingdom and the United States for supplying weaponry to France. With talks breaking down in June 1960, Abbas turned to the east and by September was visiting with Communist China, and the Soviet Union, where he was welcomed warmly. Abbas reassured the West by stating that his new alliances were opportunism, when he stated that

We prefer to defend ourselves with Chinese Arms than to allow ourselves to be killed by the arms of the West.

On August 27, 1961, he resigned and Benyoucef Ben Khedda took his place. He then subsequently joined Ahmed Ben Bella's and Houari Boumédiène's Oujda Group in opposition to the GPRA, which was subsequently dismantled.

Due to Pakistan's support to the cause of Algerian struggle for independence and self-determination, Ferhat Abbas was given a Pakistani diplomatic passport for his foreign travels.

== After independence ==
Algeria gained independence on July 5, 1962, and from September 25, 1962, to September 15, 1963, Ferhat Abbas was president of the constitutional assembly, but this institution was rapidly sidelined by Ben Bella, who had gained the presidency. Abbas resigned in protest at the FLN's decision to write the constitution outside of the constituent assembly's authority. He was subsequently expelled from the FLN, and was then placed under house arrest from 1964 until 1965.

In March 1976, he signed a statement alongside Benyoucef Benkhedda that called for a democratic constituent assembly against the country's powerful military-backed President, Col. Houari Boumédiènne and was again placed under house arrest. Still, he received official recognition in the form of a state decoration, the Medal of Resistance, on October 30, 1984. Abbas died in his sleep on 24 December 1985. He is buried at the El Alia Cemetery.

== Writings ==
Articles written in his youth are collected in Le Jeune Algérien: de la colonie vers la province (The Young Algerian: From Colony to Province) (1931). His ideas on democracy and views on history were set out in a series of essays including La nuit coloniale (The Colonial Night) (1962), Autopsie d'une guerre (Autopsy of a War) (1980) and L'indépendance confisquée (1984).

== Personal life ==
Ferhat enjoyed soccer, horseback riding, and reading, in particular, Victor Hugo and Sophocles. He married Marcelle Stöetzel (1909-2001), an Algerian-born French national on 17 September 1945. Halim was their only child, a son.

== Footnotes ==
Political offices
Preceded by None	Head of the Provisional Government of the Algerian Republic; 1958–1961	Succeeded by Benyoucef Benkhedda
Preceded by Abderrahmane Farès as President of the Provisional Executive Council of Algeria	Head of State of Algeria; 1962–1963	Succeeded by Ahmed Ben Bella as President of the Republic
