= Rabah Bitat =

Algerian politician (1925–2000)

- رابح بيطاط
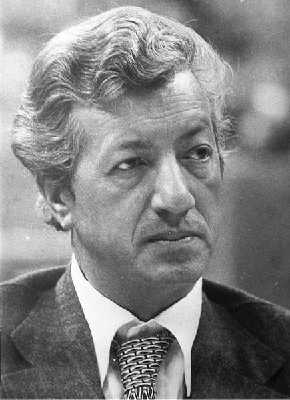

Interim President of Algeria
- In office 27 December 1978 – 9 February 1979
- Preceded by: Houari Boumédiène
- Succeeded by: Chadli Bendjedid

President of the People's National Assembly
- In office 8 March 1977 – 3 October 1990

Personal details
- Born: 19 December 1925 Aïn Kerma, Constantine, Algeria
- Died: 10 April 2000 (aged 74) Paris, France
- Party: FLN
- Spouse: Zohra Drif (m. 1962)

Rabah Bitat (Arabic: رابح بيطاط; ALA-LC: Rābaḥ Bīṭāṭ; 19 December 1925 – 10 April 2000) was an Algerian nationalist and politician.

He served as interim President of Algeria from 1978 to 1979, after Houari Boumédiène's death.

== Career ==
Bitat was appointed as Vice President of Algeria in the cabinet of Ahmed Ben Bella from September 1962 to September 1963. Bitat served as President of the People's National Assembly from April 1977 to October 1990 and was the interim President of Algeria from 27 December 1978 to 9 February 1979 after the sudden death of Houari Boumédiènne and before the election of Chadli Bendjedid. He was from the Front de Libération National.

Bitat first supported and then opposed Ahmed Ben Bella. He held the transportation portfolio under Houari Boumédiène and later became the first president of the ANP (by the constitution of 1976). Bitat served as acting president (December 1978 – February 1979) after Boumédienne's death in December 1978.

== Death ==
Bitat died in Paris on 10 April 2000.

== Personal life ==
He is survived by his wife Zohra Drif, a member of the Council of the Nation. Bitat and Drif went on to have three children and five grandchildren. They were married until his death in 2000.

== See also ==
- Declaration of 1 November 1954

Political offices
Preceded by Houari Boumediene	President of Algeria; Interim; 1978–1979	Succeeded by Chadli Bendjedid
