= Messali Hadj =

Algerian politician (1898–1974)

- مصالي الحاج
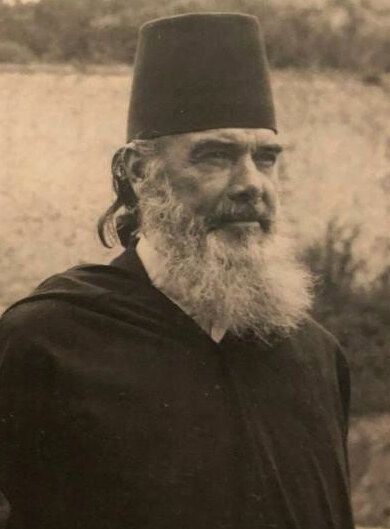
- Messali Elhadj
- In office 1927–1954

Personal details
- Born: Ahmed Ben Messali Hadj; May 16, 1898 Tlemcen, French Algeria (present-day Algeria)
- Died: June 3, 1974 (aged 76) Paris, France
- Resting place: Tlemcen
- Party: Étoile nord-africaine; Parti du peuple algérien; Movement for the Triumph of Democratic Liberties; Mouvement National Algérien
- Spouse: Émilie Busquant
- Children: Ali Messali Hadj (1930–2008), Djanina Messali-Benkelfat (1938–)
- Occupation: Politician

Ahmed Ben Messali Hadj (Arabic: أحمد مصالي الحاج, romanized: Aḥmad Miṣālī al-Ḥājj; May 16, 1898 – June 3, 1974; commonly known as Messali Hadj, Arabic: مصالي الحاج) was an Algerian nationalist politician dedicated to the independence of his homeland from French colonial rule. He is often called the "father" of Algerian nationalism.

He co-founded the Étoile nord-africaine, and founded the Parti du peuple algérien and the Mouvement pour le triomphe des libertés démocratiques before dissociating himself from the armed struggle for Independence in 1954. He also founded the Mouvement national algérien to counteract the ongoing efforts of the Front de libération nationale.

== Early life ==
Ahmed Ben Messali Hadj was born in Tlemcen in 1898. His father Hadj Ahmed Messali was of Turkish origin and his mother Ftéma Sari Ali Hadj-Eddine belonged to a family of seven daughters, raised in Muslim traditions by their father, a qadi, a member of the Darqawiyya brotherhood. He was educated in a local French primary school and also received a religious education influenced by the Darqawiyya Sufi order.

Messali Hadj served in the French army from 1918 to 1921; having trained in Bordeaux and then promoted as sergeant in 1919. By October 1923, at the age of 25, Messali Hadj went to Paris to find work; upon his arrival, he sold bonnets and Tlemceni handicrafts, and he also enrolled in Arabic-language university courses. During his time in Paris, Messali Hadj met his French wife, Émilie Busquant, a worker revolutionary's daughter. His time in Paris also corresponded with the first meetings of Maghribi workers in France which called for the independence of all colonies. Abdelkader Hadj Ali recruited Messali Hadj to the French Communist Party (PCF) colonial commission in 1925.

== Political career ==
=== Founding of nationalist organisations ===
In 1926 Messali Hadj founded the "Étoile Nord-Africaine" (ENA). Consequently, he became one of the most prominent Algerian nationalists seeking to remove all French forces and to end French colonial rule in Algeria. Messali Hadj went to Brussels in 1927 to outline the ENA's demands for the abolition of the Indigénat and amnesty for all those convicted under it; moreover, he listed several other demands including: the right to form trade unions, education for all, and social welfare and representational legislation. By 1929 the ENA was banned in France once its links with the French Communist Party were severed. Thereafter, Messali Hadj rebranded the ENA several times in the 1930s and 1940s; hence, he would find himself frequently jailed or exiled.

By 1935 Messali Hadj had reorganised the "Glorieuse Étoile Nord-Africaine" (ENA) party and distanced it from the French communists by presenting it as an Algerian nationalist organisation describing it as a "Union Nationale des Musulmans Nord-Africains". However, whilst he was in temporary exile in Geneva, Switzerland, Messali Hadj met Shakib Arslan and reoriented from Marxism to Pan-Arabism and Islamism. Consequently, Messali Hadj reorganised his nationalist movement as the "Parti du Peuple Algérien" (PPA) in March 1937.

However, in March 1941 Messali Hadj was tried by a Vichy court and sentenced to 16 years of hard labour. He was confined first to southern Algeria and then in Brazzaville in French Equatorial Africa. Nonetheless, he continued to be active in the Algerian nationalist movement. Once World War II came to an end, he was amnestied and returned to Algeria. However, straining relations between the "Parti du Peuple Algérien" and the "Amis du Manifeste et de la Liberté" (AML), as well as the decision to arrest and deport Messali Hadj, contributed to the outbreak of riots in Sétif and Constantinois on May 8, 1945. It was the first day of peace after the Nazi surrender in World War II and despite the celebrations in France, the mood of the French remained somber. France was low on resources, fuel, and raw materials, its railway infrastructure and industry in ruins. Politically, unrest was mounting, and even the accusation of collaboration was enough to paint a target on someone's back. Meanwhile, the Muslims of Algeria were mobilizing to march for their own self-determination under slogans like "Muslims Awaken!" and "It's the Muslim flag that will float over North Africa" appearing on graffitied walls overnight. Messali Hadj had been exiled to Brazzaville as soon as French authorities received word of plans by Parti du Peuple Algérien to escalate the deepening unrest between the French settler colons and the Muslims. The death of some one hundred Europeans during the riots saw the French authorities ruthlessly suppress the Algerian nationalists and the army and police killed approximately 10,000 Muslims.

By 1946 Messali Hadj founded the "Mouvement pour le triomphe des libertés démocratiques" (MTLD) to replace the PPA, which had been outlawed by the French authorities. However, the MTLF was often referred to as the "MTLD-PPA" because, whilst the MTLD pursued public political strategies, the PPA continued to press for independence. By the end of 1947 the PPA-MTLD approved the creation of the Organisation spéciale to accelerate the independence movement. The party achieved considerable success in the elections for the Algerian Assembly. However, Messali Hadj's assertion of Arabism alienated the Kabyles and contributed to the Berberist crisis in 1949.

Once the Algerian War of Liberation began, Messali Hadj sought to compete with the Front de Libération Nationale by mobilising the Mouvement National Algérien (MNA) in December 1954.

=== Leader of the MNA ===
After the outbreak of the Algerian War of Independence in 1954 which was started against his wishes, Messali created the Mouvement National Algérien, or MNA (Algerian National Movement). Messali's followers clashed with the FLN; it was the only socialist faction not absorbed into the Front's fight for independence. The FLN's armed wing, the Armée de Libération Nationale (ALN) wiped out the MNA's guerrilla apparatus in Algeria early on in the war; the infighting then continued in France, during the so-called "café wars" over control of the expatriate community. According to author Remy Mauduit the FLN's fight with the Messalists “did not stop until the Messalists were exterminated or forced to rally to the French.” According to this author, 10,000 were killed and another 25,000 wounded in the conflict. In 1958, Messali supported the proposals of President Charles de Gaulle, and France probably attempted to capitalize on the internal rivalries of the nationalist movement. During negotiation talks in 1961 the FLN did not accept the participation of the MNA, and this led to new outbursts of fighting.

=== After Algerian independence ===
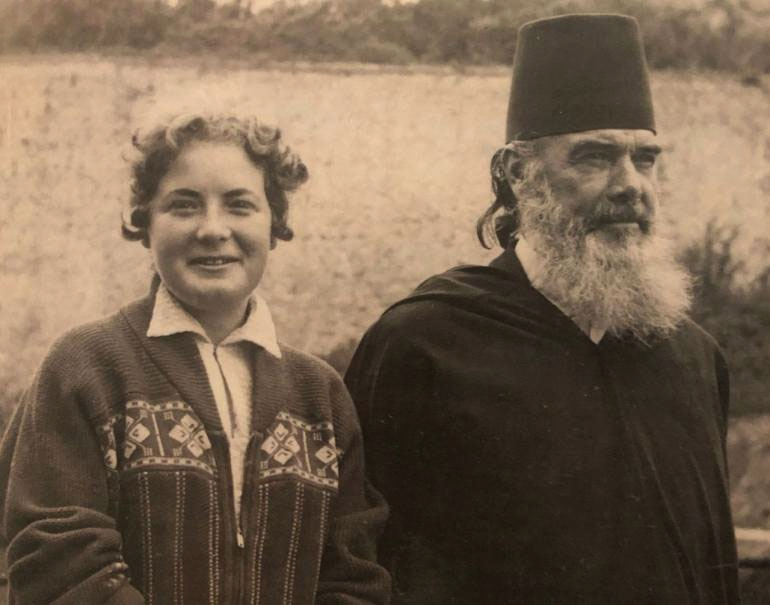
Messali Hadj with his daughter Djanina Messali-Benkelfat.

In 1962, as Algeria gained independence from France, Messali tried to transform his group into a legitimate political party, but it was not successful, and the FLN seized control over Algeria as a one-party state.

== Personal life ==
He was married to Émilie Busquant, a French feminist, anarcho-syndicalist and anti-colonial activist.

His daughter, Djanina Messali-Benkelfat, published a book about her father called "Une vie partagée avec Messali Hadj, mon père" ("A Life Shared with Messali Hadj, my Father").

Messali Hadj was in exile in France when he died in 1974. His body was buried in his native Tlemcen.

== See also ==
- L'Algérie Libre

== Bibliography ==
- Adamson, Fiona (2006), The Constitutive Power of Political Ideology: Nationalism and the Emergence of Corporate Agency in World Politics, University College London
- Goebel, Michael. Anti-Imperial Metropolis: Interwar Paris and the Seeds of Third World Nationalism (Cambridge University Press, 2015) excerpts
- Jacques, Simon (2007), Algérie: le passé, l'Algérie française, la révolution, 1954-1958, Harmattan, ISBN 978-2296028586
- Malley, Robert (1996), The Call From Algeria: Third Worldism, Revolution, and the Turn to Islam, University of California Press, ISBN 0520917022
- McDougall, James (2017), A History of Algeria, Cambridge University Press, ISBN 978-0521851640
- Moreau, Odile (2004), "Echoes of National Liberation: Turkey Viewed from the Maghrib in the 1920s", in McDougall, James (ed.), Nation, Society and Culture in North Africa, Routledge, ISBN 1135761051
- Naylor, Phillip C. (2004), Historical Dictionary of Algeria, Rowman & Littlefield, ISBN 0810879190
- Ness, Immanuel; Cope, Zak (2016), The Palgrave Encyclopedia of Imperialism and Anti-Imperialism, Springer, ISBN 978-0230392786
- Ruedy, John Douglas (2005), Modern Algeria: The Origins and Development of a Nation, Indiana University Press, ISBN 0253217822.
- Shrader, Charles R. (1999), The First Helicopter War: Logistics and Mobility in Algeria, 1954-1962, Greenwood Publishing Group, ISBN 0275963888
- Stora, Benjamin (2004), Messali Hadj 1898-1974, Paris: Pluriel
