= Movement for the Triumph of Democratic Liberties =

Movement for the Triumph of Democratic Liberties حركة الانتصار للحريات الديمقراطية
- Abbreviation: MTLD
- Leader: Messali Hadj
- Founded: 2 November 1946
- Dissolved: 5 November 1954
- Preceded by: PPA
- Succeeded by: MNA; FLN
- Ideology: Algerian nationalism Arab nationalism Algerian independence Factions: (1948-1949); Berberism
- Political position: Centre-left to left-wing

The Movement for the Triumph of Democratic Liberties (MTLD), name proposed by Maiza, was created October 1946 to replace the outlawed Parti du Peuple Algerien (PPA). Messali Hadj remained as its president.

The MTLD was created on the same platform as that of the PPA, that is full independence for Algeria. A month after its creation it won five seats (out of 15 elected) in the November 'two colleges' Algerian elections, despite numerous irregularities. During that same election Ferhat Abbas was elected under the banner of the Union Democratique du Manifeste Algerien (UDMA), a party he formed in the same year.

A power struggle erupted between Messali Hadj and the Central Committee, the legislative body of the Party. The first attempt at reconciliation took place in Belcourt, a suburb of Algiers, in August 1954. Messalists and Centralists with Organisation spéciale (OS) members as observers, could not reach a compromise. A second attempt at rallying Messali was made later in 1954 by a "Committee of Neutralists" headed by Belkacem Radjef with the famous "Appel A La Raison' (call to reason). That also failed and Messali was permanently isolated from all future decisions made by the MTLD and its Centralists, Neutralists and OS members.

The National Liberation Front (FLN) was formed after the OS, expanded as the Comité Révolutionaire d'Unité et d'Action (CRUA), triggered the War of Independence in November 1954. It called for all Algerians to unite under the same banner to fight for independence at any cost.

== See also ==
- Nationalism and resistance in Algeria
- L'Algérie Libre
