= Algerian People's Party =

Algerian People's Party (PPA)
- Leader: Messali Hadj
- Founded: 11 March 1937
- Dissolved: 30 September 1946
- Preceded by: ENA
- Succeeded by: MTLD
- Ideology: Algerian nationalism Arab nationalism Algerian independence Anti-imperialism; Social democracy
- Political position: Centre-left to left-wing

The Algerian People's Party, was a successor organization of the North African Star, led by veteran Algerian nationalist Messali Hadj. It was formed on 11 March 1937. In 1936, the Etoile Nord Africaine (ENA), its predecessor, had joined the French Front Populaire, a coalition of French leftist political parties in power at the time. The relationship lasted a bit over six months. The government formed by the Front Populaire dissolved the ENA in January 1937, hence the creation of the PPA two months later. Despite using peaceful methods of protest, the group's members were constantly pursued by the police in France and banned by French colonial authorities in Algeria. From 1938 until 1946, it operated as a clandestine organization. However, it had only moderate activities during World War II. There was also great hope that Algeria would be rewarded for its help in liberating France from the Germans, but in May 1945, the events of the Sétif and Guelma massacre ended all hopes.

Early May 1945, Pierre Gazagne, secretary of the general government headed by Yves Chataigneau, took advantage of his absence to exile Messali Hadj and to arrest the leaders of the PPA. The PPA was reconstituted October 1946 under the name Mouvement pour le Triomphe des Libertes Democratiques (MTLD).

A few ex-PPA members, having decided that freedom could only be acquired through military means, created the Special Organization (OS) while loosely maintaining membership in the MTLD. The OS sought the support of all the different Algerian political organizations to create the National Liberation Front (FLN) after launching the Algerian War of Independence in 1954. Messali Hadj had completely lost control of the movement in a process that began more than two years earlier when he refused to compromise with the mainstream in the MTLD. In 1955, he created his own so-called resistance group, by the name of the Algerian National Movement (Mouvement National Algérien)(MNA). Supported by the French, it was marginalized during the eight years of war, attacked and destroyed by the FLN both in Algeria and during the "café wars" in France.

== See also ==
- Nationalism and resistance in Algeria
- L'Algérie Libre
