= Algerian War =

1954–1962 war of Algerian independence from France

Algerian War ثورة التحرير الجزائرية Guerre d'Algérie Amgaru n Lezzayer
- Part of the decolonisation of Africa
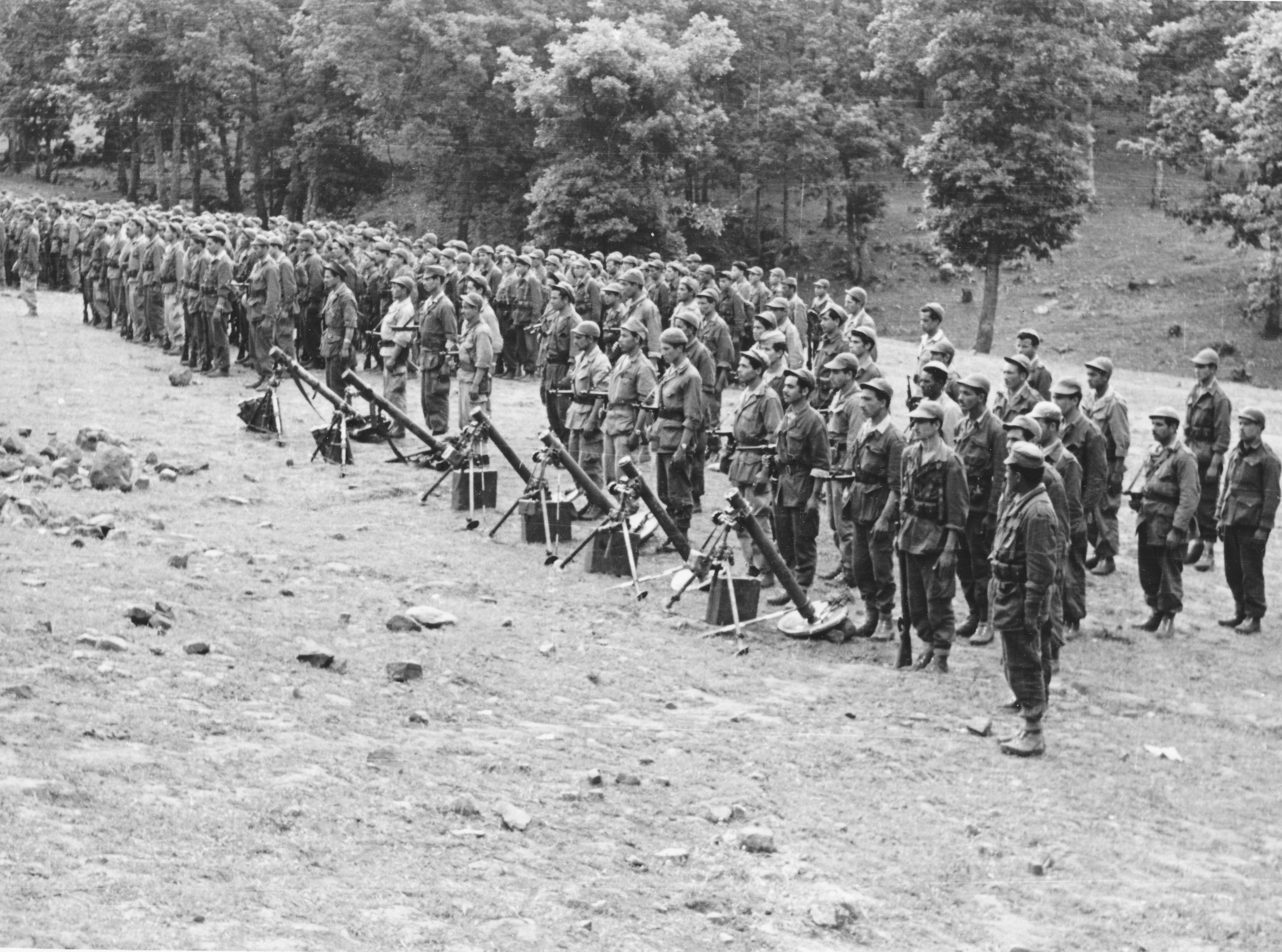
- National Liberation Army soldiers, 1958
Date	1 November 1954 – 19 March 1962 (7 years, 4 months, 2 weeks and 4 days)
Location	French Algeria; spillovers into Metropolitan France
Result	Algerian victory

Belligerents
FLN; MNA; PCA	Fourth French Republic (1954–1958); Fifth French Republic (1958–1962); La Main Rouge; MPC; ANPA; OAS (1961–62)

Commanders and leaders
Mourad Didouche †; Mohamed Boudiaf; Krim Belkacem; Larbi Ben M'Hidi (executed); Rabah Bitat; Hocine Aït Ahmed; Saadi Yacef; Houari Boumédiène; Politicians: Ferhat Abbas; Ahmed Ben Bella; Frantz Fanon; Mohamed Khider	(France) Jacques Soustelle (1955–56); (France) Raoul Salan (1956–58); (France) Robert Lacoste (1956–58); (France) Jacques Massu (1956–60); (France) Paul Aussaresses; (France) Maurice Challe (1958–60); Politicians: Pierre Mendes-France; Guy Mollet; Charles de Gaulle; (France) Saïd Boualam; Pierre Lagaillarde; Edmond Jouhaud; Jean-Jacques Susini

Strength
300,000 identified; 40,000 civilian support	470,000 troops (maximum reached and maintained by the French military from 1956 to 1962) or 700,000 men (Note: It is unclear whether the latter estimate includes the Harkis or not); 90,000 to 180,000 Harkis (Note: Pro-French Algerian auxiliaries); 1.5 million men mobilized; 3,000 (OAS)

Casualties and losses
140,000 to 152,863 FLN soldiers killed, including 12,000 in internal purges and 4,300 killed in metropolitan France; Unknown wounded; 198 executed	23,196 French soldiers killed; 60,188 wounded; 4,362 Harkis killed or missing; 6,000 European civilian deaths; 100 killed; 2,000 jailed; 4 executed
- ~1,500,000 total Algerian deaths (Algerian historians' estimate) ~1,000,000 total Algerian deaths (Horne's estimate); ~400,000 to 700,000 total deaths (French historians' estimate): 1 million Europeans fled; 200,000 Jews fled; 8,000 villages destroyed; Over 2 million Algerians resettled or displaced

The Algerian War, also known as the Algerian Revolution, the Franco-Algerian War, or the Algerian War of Independence, (Note: Arabic: الثورة الجزائرية al-Thawra al-Jaza'iriyah; French: Guerre d'Algérie (and sometimes in Algeria as the War of 1 November)) was an armed conflict between France and the Algerian National Liberation Front (FLN) from 1954 to 1962, which led to Algeria winning its independence from France. An important decolonization war, it was a complex conflict characterized by guerrilla warfare and war crimes. The conflict also became a civil war between the different communities and within the communities. The war took place mainly on the territory of French Algeria, with repercussions in metropolitan France.

Effectively started by members of the FLN on 1 November 1954, during the Toussaint Rouge ("Red All Saints' Day"), the conflict led to serious political crises in France, causing the fall of the Fourth Republic (1946–1958), to be replaced by the Fifth Republic with a strengthened presidency. The brutality of the methods employed by the French forces failed to win hearts and minds in Algeria, alienated support in metropolitan France, and discredited French prestige abroad. As the war dragged on, the French public slowly turned against it and many of France's key allies, including the United States, switched from supporting France to abstaining in the UN debate on Algeria. After major demonstrations in Algiers and several other cities in favor of independence (1960) and a United Nations resolution recognizing the right to independence, Charles de Gaulle, the first president of the Fifth Republic, decided to open a series of negotiations with the FLN. These concluded with the signing of the Évian Accords in March 1962. A referendum took place on 8 April 1962 and the French electorate approved the Évian Accords. The final result was 91% in favor of the ratification of this agreement and on 1 July, the Accords were subject to a second referendum in Algeria, where 99.72% voted for independence and just 0.28% against.

The planned French withdrawal led to a state crisis. This included various assassination attempts on de Gaulle as well as some attempts at military coups. Most of the former were carried out by the Organisation armée secrète (OAS), an underground organization formed mainly from French military personnel supporting a French Algeria, which committed a large number of bombings and murders both in Algeria and in the homeland to stop the planned independence.

The war caused the deaths of between 400,000 and 1.5 million Algerians, 25,600 French soldiers, and 6,000 Europeans. War crimes committed during the war included massacres of civilians, rape, and torture; the French destroyed over 8,000 villages, used chemical weapons against both fighters and civilians, and relocated over 2 million Algerians to concentration camps. Upon independence in 1962, 900,000 European-Algerians (Pieds-noirs) fled to France within a few months for fear of the FLN's revenge. The French government was unprepared to receive such a vast number of refugees, which caused turmoil in France. The majority of Algerian Muslims who had worked for the French were disarmed and left behind, as the agreement between French and Algerian authorities declared that no actions could be taken against them. However, the Harkis in particular, having served as auxiliaries with the French army, were regarded as traitors and many were murdered by the FLN or by lynch mobs, often after being abducted and tortured. About 20,000 Harki families (around 90,000 people) managed to flee to France, some with help from their French officers acting against orders, and today they and their descendants form a significant part of the population of Algerians in France.

== Background ==
=== Conquest of Algeria ===
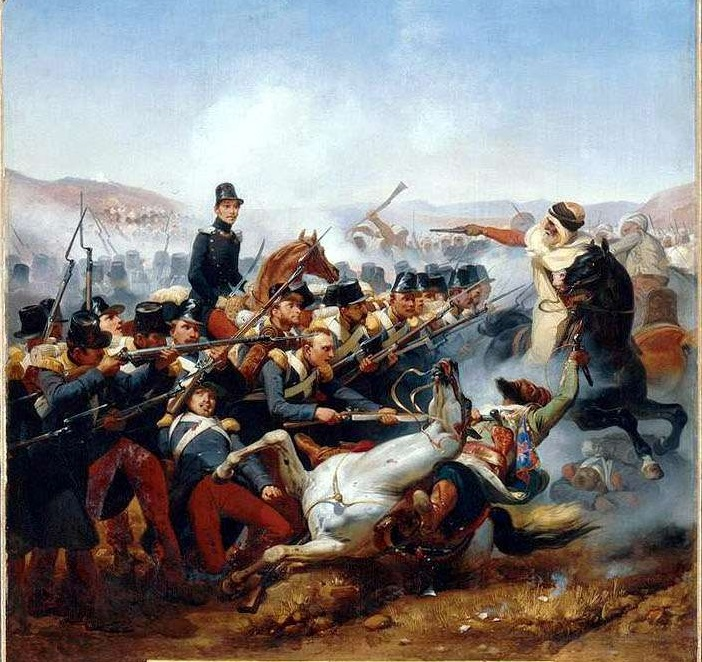
The Battle of Somah in 1836

The decision to capture Algiers was made by Charles X and his ministers in January 1830. An invasion had already been discussed throughout the French blockade of Algiers from 1827 to 1830 in part in reaction to Barbary corsair activities and their ransoming of Christian captives and slaves, and the refusal of Marseilles merchants to pay their debts to the Dey of Algiers. By early 1830 however, the real motive was to distract and assuage with a foreign conquest French opinion hostile to the increasingly authoritarian king.

On the pretext of a slight to their consul, the French attacked and captured Algiers in June 1830. In following years the conquest spread to the interior. Directed by Marshall Bugeaud, who became the first Governor-General of Algeria, the conquest was violent and marked by a "scorched earth" policy designed to reduce the power of the Abdelkader, including massacres, mass rapes and other atrocities. Between 500,000 and 1,000,000, from approximately 3 million Algerians, were killed in the first three decades of the conquest. French losses from 1830 to 1851 were 3,336 killed in action and 92,329 dying in hospital.

In 1834, Algeria became a French military colony. It was declared by the Constitution of 1848 to be an integral part of France and was divided into three departments: Alger, Oran and Constantine. Many French and other Europeans (Spanish, Italians, Maltese and others) later settled in Algeria.

Under the Second Empire (1852–1871), the Code de l'indigénat (Indigenous Code) was implemented by the sénatus-consulte of 14 July 1865. It allowed Muslims to apply for full French citizenship, a measure that few took since it involved renouncing the right to be governed by sharia law in personal matters and was widely considered to be apostasy. Its first article stipulated:

The indigenous Muslim is French; however, he will continue to be subjected to Muslim law. He may be admitted to serve in the army (armée de terre) and the navy (armée de mer). He may be called to functions and civil employment in Algeria. He may, on his demand, be admitted to enjoy the rights of a French citizen; in this case, he is subjected to the political and civil laws of France.

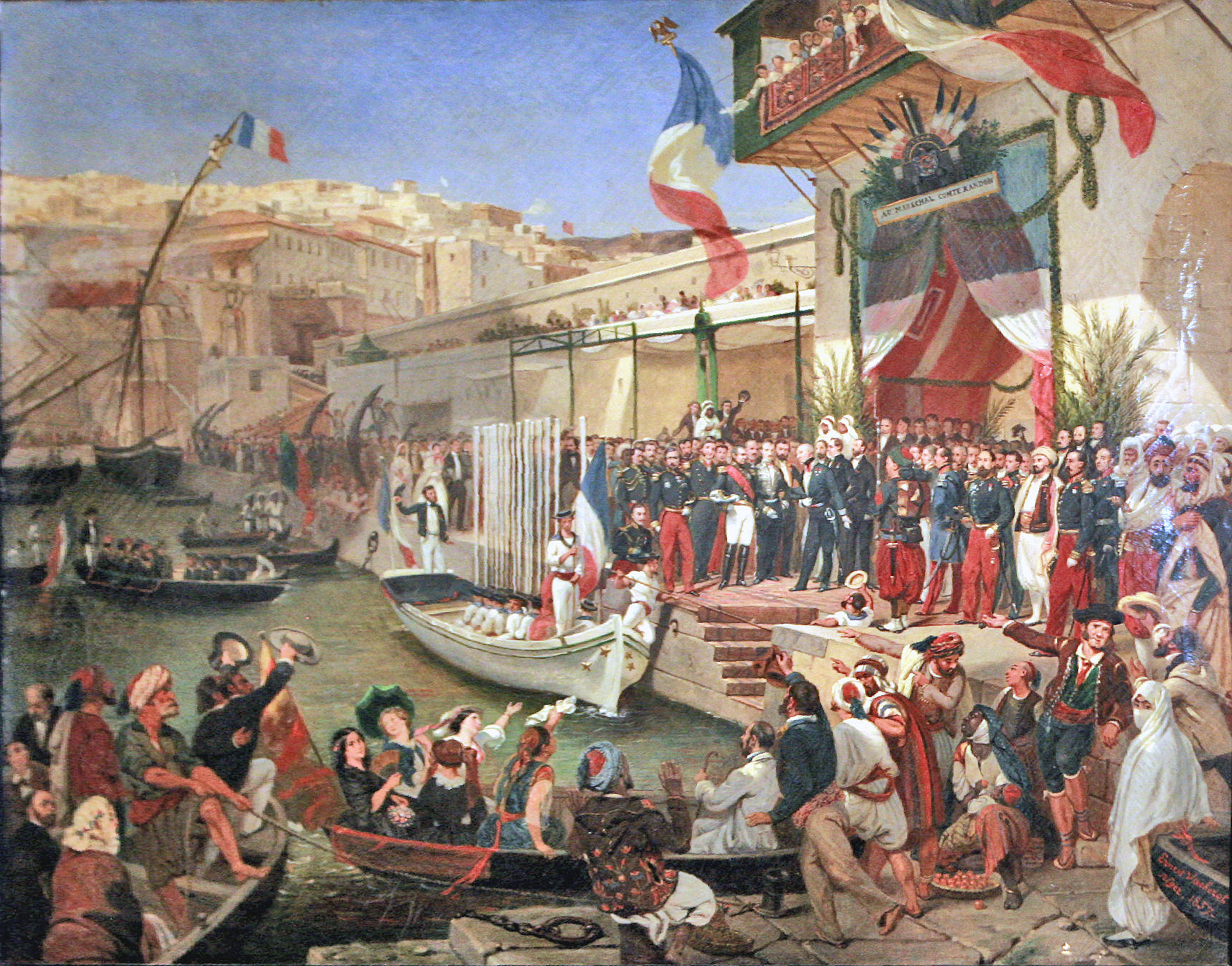
The arrival of Marshal Randon in Algiers in 1857

Prior to 1870, fewer than 200 demands were registered by Muslims and 152 by Jewish Algerians. The 1865 decree was then modified by the 1870 Crémieux Decree, which granted French nationality to Jews living in one of the three Algerian departments. In 1881, the Code de l'Indigénat made the discrimination official by creating specific penalties for indigènes and organising the seizure or appropriation of their lands.

During World War II, under Vichy France, equality of rights was proclaimed by the ordonnance of 7 March 1944 and later confirmed by the loi Lamine Guèye of 7 May 1946, which granted French citizenship to all subjects of France's territories and overseas departments, and by the 1946 Constitution. The Law of 20 September 1947 granted French citizenship to all Algerian subjects, who were not required to renounce their Muslim personal status.

Unlike all other overseas possessions acquired by France during the 19th century, Algeria was considered and legally classified to be an integral part of France.

=== Algerian Nationalism ===
A 1954 film about French Algeria

Both Muslim and European Algerians took part in World War I and fought for France. Algerian Muslims served as tirailleurs (such regiments were created as early as 1842) and spahis; and French settlers as Zouaves or Chasseurs d'Afrique. US President Woodrow Wilson's 1918 Fourteen Points called for "A free, open-minded, and absolutely impartial adjustment of all colonial claims, based upon a strict observance of the principle that in determining all such questions of sovereignty the interests of the populations concerned must have equal weight with the equitable claims of the government whose title is to be determined." Some Algerian intellectuals, dubbed oulémas, began to nurture the desire for independence or, at the very least, autonomy and self-rule.

Within that context, Khalid ibn Hashim, a grandson of Abd el-Kadir, spearheaded the resistance against the French in the first half of the 20th century and was a member of the directing committee of the French Communist Party. In 1926, he founded the Étoile Nord-Africaine ("North African Star"), to which Messali Hadj, also a member of the Communist Party and of its affiliated trade union, the Confédération générale du travail unitaire (CGTU), joined the following year.

The North African Star broke from the Communist Party in 1928, before being dissolved in 1929 at Paris's demand. Amid growing discontent from the Algerian population, the Third Republic (1871–1940) acknowledged some demands, and the Popular Front initiated the Blum-Viollette proposal in 1936, which was supposed to enlighten the Indigenous Code by giving French citizenship to a small number of Muslims. The pieds-noirs (Algerians of European origin) violently demonstrated against it and the North African Party also opposed it, leading to its abandonment.

In 1937, the pro-independence party was dissolved, and its leaders were charged with the illegal reconstitution of a dissolved league, leading to Messali Hadj's 1937 founding of the Parti du peuple algérien (Algerian People's Party, PPA), which no longer espoused full independence but only extensive autonomy. This new party was dissolved in 1939. Under Vichy France, the French state attempted to abrogate the Crémieux Decree to suppress the Jews' French citizenship, but the measure was never implemented.

In 1938, the nationalist leader Ferhat Abbas founded the Algerian Popular Union (Union populaire algérienne). In 1943, Abbas wrote the Algerian People's Manifesto (Manifeste du peuple algérien). Arrested after the Sétif and Guelma massacre of May 8, 1945, when the French Army and pieds-noirs mobs killed between 6,000 and 30,000 Algerians, Abbas founded the Democratic Union of the Algerian Manifesto (UDMA) in 1946 and was elected as a deputy. Founded in 1954, the National Liberation Front (FLN) created an armed wing, the Armée de Libération Nationale (National Liberation Army) to engage in an armed struggle against French authority. Many Algerian soldiers who served for the French Army in the First Indochina War had strong sympathy for the Vietnamese fighting against France and drew on their experience to support the ALN.

France, which had just lost French Indochina, was determined not to lose the next colonial war, particularly in its oldest and nearest major colony, which was regarded as a part of Metropolitan France (rather than a colony), by French law.

== War chronology ==
According to historian Natalya Vince, the FLN leadership understood that they could not achieve Algerian independence through direct military victory over the powerful French army. Instead, they adopted tactics later recognized as asymmetric or revolutionary warfare, including guerrilla warfare and urban terrorism. Their strategy aimed to erode France's political will to continue the conflict, either by increasing the costs of war and exhausting public support or by exposing French repression and undermining its moral authority.

The FLN took inspiration from Chinese and Vietnamese revolutionary leaders, particularly Mao Zedong and Hồ Chí Minh, and maintained contact with them by 1959. They studied General Vo Nguyen Giap's tactics at the battle of Dien Bien Phu, where the Viet Minh overcame French forces through strategic use of terrain and siege warfare. The FLN also embraced Mao's principle that guerrillas must integrate with the rural population, securing local support to sustain their movement and evade enemy forces.

=== Beginning of hostilities ===
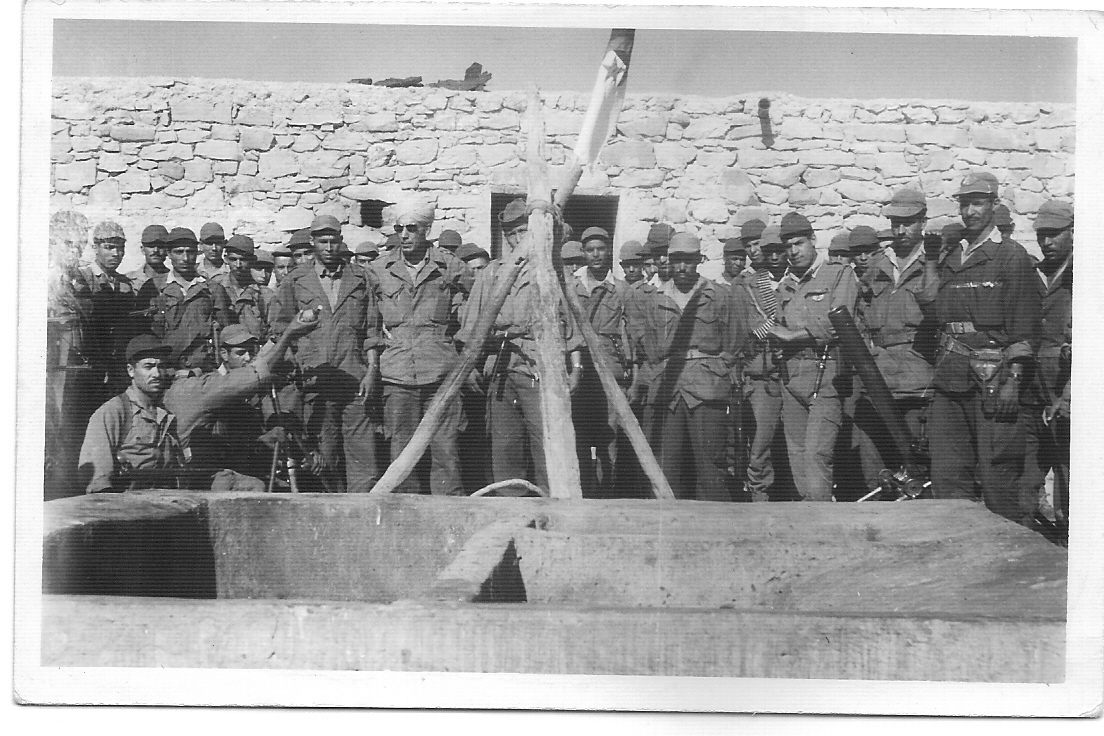
Algerian rebel fighters in the mountains

In the early morning hours of 1 November 1954, FLN maquisards (guerrillas) attacked military and civilian targets throughout Algeria in what became known as the Toussaint Rouge (Red All-Saints' Day). From Cairo, the FLN broadcast the declaration of 1 November 1954 written by the journalist Mohamed Aïchaoui calling on Muslims in Algeria to join in a national struggle for the "restoration of the Algerian state – sovereign, democratic and social – within the framework of the principles of Islam."

It was the reaction of Premier Pierre Mendès France (Radical-Socialist Party), who a few months before had completed the liquidation of France's tete empire in Indochina, which set the tone of French policy for five years. He declared in the National Assembly, "One does not compromise when it comes to defending the internal peace of the nation, the unity and integrity of the Republic. The Algerian departments are part of the French Republic. They have been French for a long time, and they are irrevocably French. ... Between them and metropolitan France there can be no conceivable secession."

At first most Algerians were in favor of a relative status-quo. While Messali Hadj had radicalized by forming the FLN, Ferhat Abbas maintained a more moderate, electoral strategy. Fewer than 500 fellaghas (pro-Independence fighters) could be counted at the beginning of the conflict. The Algerian population radicalized itself in particular because of the terrorist acts of the French-sponsored Main Rouge (Red Hand) group, which targeted anti-colonialists in all of the Maghreb region (Morocco, Tunisia and Algeria), killing, for example, Tunisian activist Farhat Hached in 1952.

=== FLN ===
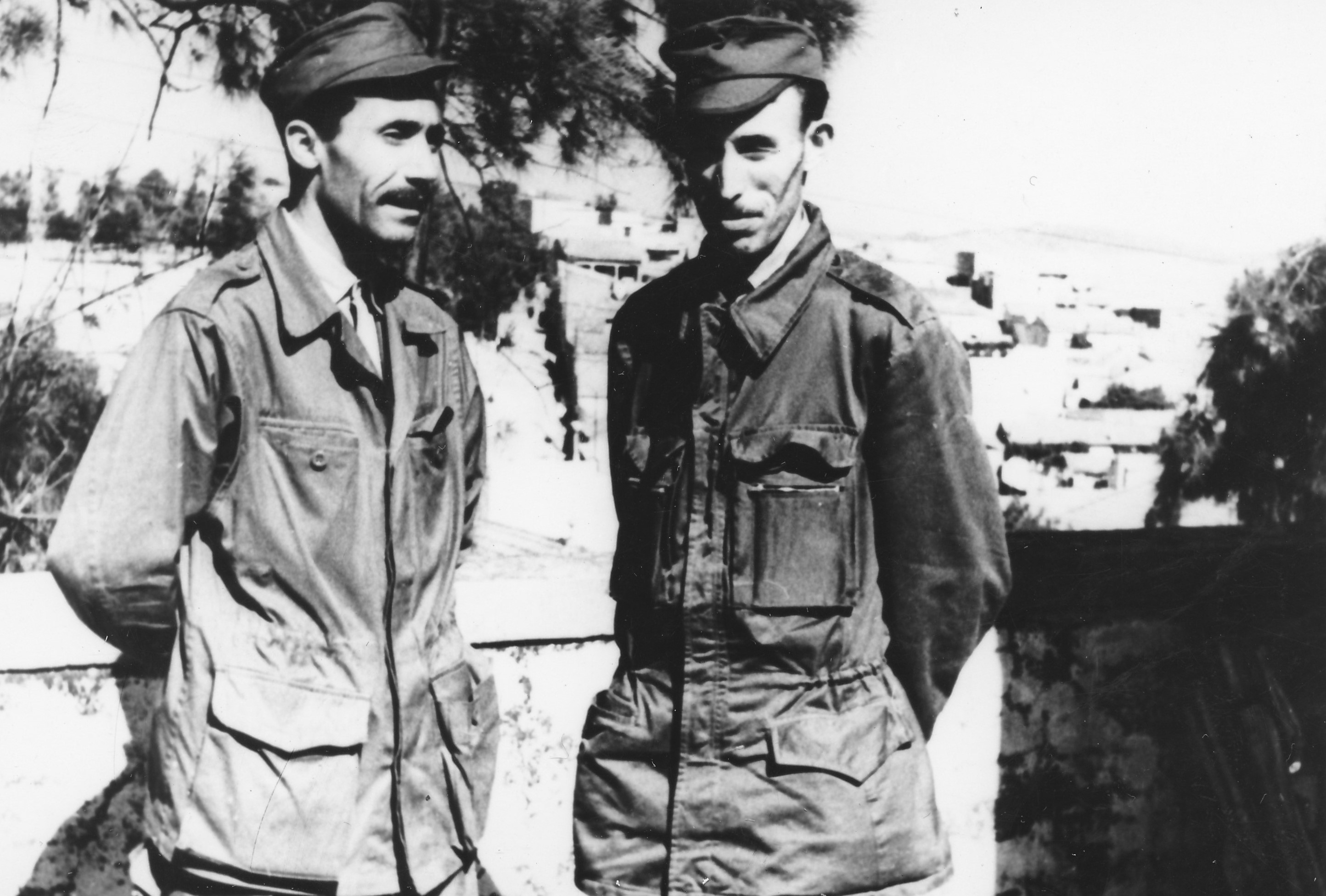
Houari Boumediène (right), the leader of the National Liberation Army and future President of Algeria, during the war

The FLN uprising presented nationalist groups with the question of whether to adopt armed revolt as the main course of action. During the first year of the war, Ferhat Abbas's Democratic Union of the Algerian Manifesto (UDMA), the ulema, and the Algerian Communist Party (PCA) maintained a friendly neutrality toward the FLN. The communists, who had made no move to cooperate in the uprising at the start, later tried to infiltrate the FLN, but FLN leaders publicly repudiated the support of the party. In April 1956, Abbas flew to Cairo, where he formally joined the FLN. This action brought in many évolués who had supported the UDMA in the past. The AUMA also threw the full weight of its prestige behind the FLN. Bendjelloul and the pro-integrationist moderates had already abandoned their efforts to mediate between the French and the rebels.

After the collapse of the MTLD, the veteran nationalist Messali Hadj formed the leftist Mouvement National Algérien (MNA), which advocated a policy of violent revolution and total independence similar to that of the FLN, but aimed to compete with that organisation. The Armée de Libération Nationale (ALN), the military wing of the FLN, subsequently wiped out the MNA guerrilla operation in Algeria, and Messali Hadj's movement lost what weak influence it had had there. However, the MNA retained the support of many Algerian workers in France through the Union Syndicale des Travailleurs Algériens (the Union of Algerian Workers). The FLN also established a strong organization in France to oppose the MNA. The "Café wars", resulting in nearly 5,000 deaths, were waged in France between the two rebel groups throughout the years of the War of Independence.

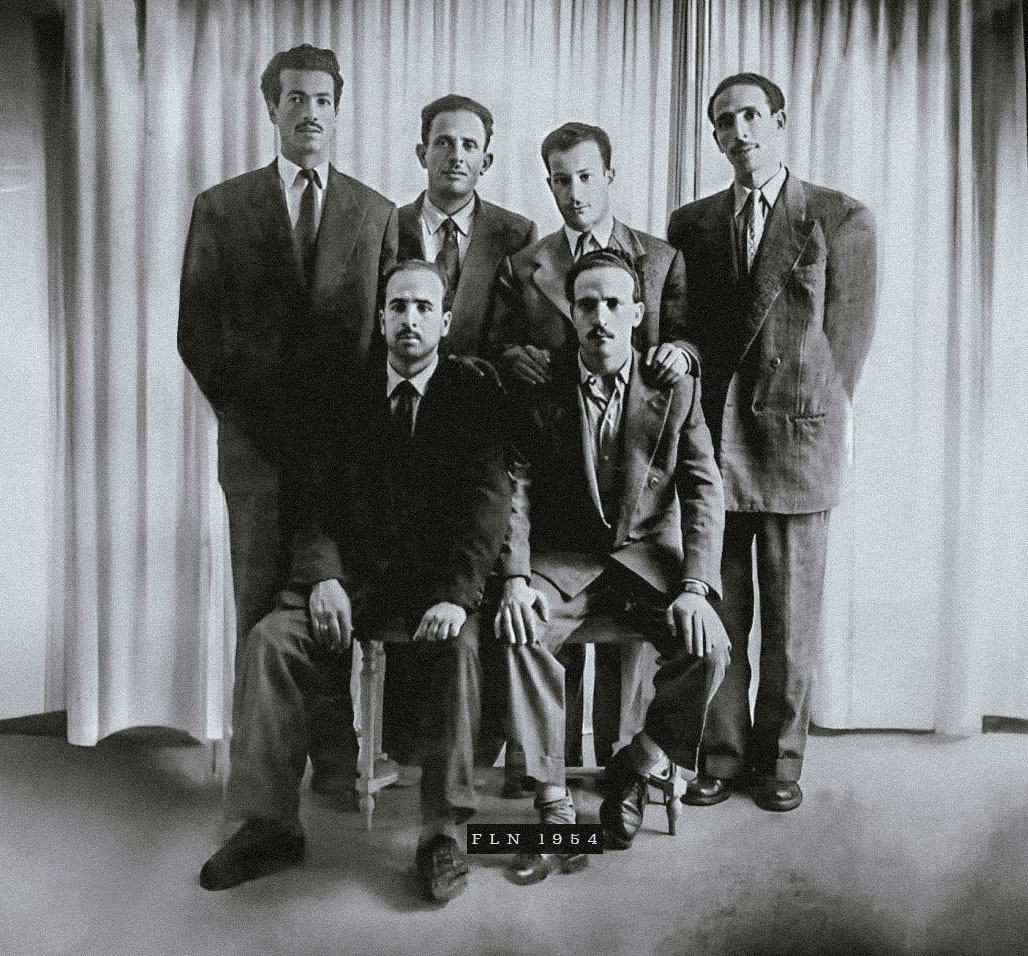
The six historical Leaders of the FLN: Rabah Bitat, Mostefa Ben Boulaïd, Mourad Didouche, Mohammed Boudiaf, Krim Belkacem and Larbi Ben M'Hidi

On the political front, the FLN worked to persuade—and to coerce—the Algerian masses to support the aims of the independence movement through contributions. FLN-influenced labor unions, professional associations, and students' and women's organizations were created to lead opinion in diverse segments of the population, but here too, violent coercion was widely used. Frantz Fanon, a psychiatrist from Martinique who became the FLN's leading political theorist, provided a sophisticated intellectual justification for the use of violence in achieving national liberation. From Cairo, Ahmed Ben Bella ordered the liquidation of potential interlocuteurs valables, those independent representatives of the Muslim community acceptable to the French through whom a compromise or reforms within the system might be achieved.

As the FLN campaign of influence spread through the countryside, many European farmers in the interior (called Pieds-Noirs), many of whom lived on lands taken from Muslim communities during the nineteenth century, sold their holdings and sought refuge in Algiers and other Algerian cities. After a series of bloody, random massacres and bombings by Muslim Algerians in several towns and cities, the French Pieds-Noirs and urban French population began to demand that the French government engage in sterner countermeasures, including the proclamation of a state of emergency, capital punishment for political crimes, denunciation of all separatists, and most ominously, a call for 'tit-for-tat' reprisal operations by police, military, and para-military forces. Colon vigilante units, whose unauthorized activities were conducted with the passive cooperation of police authorities, carried out ratonnades (literally, rat-hunts, raton being a derogatory term for Muslim Algerians) against suspected FLN members of the Muslim community.

By 1955, effective political action groups within the Algerian colonial community succeeded in convincing many of the Governors General sent by Paris that the military was not the way to resolve the conflict. A major success was the conversion of Jacques Soustelle, who went to Algeria as governor general in January 1955 determined to restore peace. Soustelle, a one-time leftist and by 1955 an ardent Gaullist, began an ambitious reform program (the Soustelle Plan) aimed at improving economic conditions among the Muslim population.

=== After the Philippeville massacre ===
Universal Newsreels Rebellion Spreads in North Africa, 1955

The FLN adopted tactics similar to those of nationalist groups in Asia, and the French did not realize the seriousness of the challenge they faced until 1955, when the FLN moved into urban areas. An important watershed in the War of Independence was the massacre of Pieds-Noirs civilians by the FLN near the town of Philippeville (now known as Skikda) in August 1955. Before this operation, FLN policy was to attack only military and government-related targets. The commander of the Constantine wilaya/region, however, decided a drastic escalation was needed. The killing by the FLN and its supporters of 123 people (71 of them French), including old women and babies, shocked Jacques Soustelle into calling for more repressive measures against the rebels. The French authorities stated that 1,273 guerrillas died in what Soustelle admitted were "severe" reprisals. The FLN subsequently claimed that 12,000 Muslims were killed. Soustelle's repression was an early cause of the Algerian population's rallying to the FLN. After Philippeville, Soustelle declared sterner measures and an all-out war began. In 1956, demonstrations by French Algerians caused the French government to reject reforms.

Soustelle's successor, Governor General Robert Lacoste, a socialist, abolished the Algerian Assembly. Lacoste saw the assembly, which was dominated by pieds-noirs, as hindering the work of his administration, and he undertook the rule of Algeria by decree. He favored stepping up French military operations and granted the army exceptional police powers—a concession of dubious legality under French law—to deal with the mounting political violence. At the same time, Lacoste proposed a new administrative structure to give Algeria some autonomy and a decentralized government. Whilst remaining an integral part of France, Algeria was to be divided into five districts, each of which would have a territorial assembly elected from a single slate of candidates. Until 1958, deputies representing Algerian districts were able to delay the passage of the measure by the National Assembly of France.

In August and September 1956, the leadership of the FLN guerrillas operating within Algeria (popularly known as "internals") met to organize a formal policy-making body to synchronize the movement's political and military activities. The highest authority of the FLN was vested in the thirty-four member National Council of the Algerian Revolution (Conseil National de la Révolution Algérienne, CNRA), within which the five-man Committee of Coordination and Enforcement (Comité de Coordination et d'Exécution, CCE) formed the executive. The leadership of the regular FLN forces based in Tunisia and Morocco ("externals"), including Ben Bella, knew the conference was taking place but by chance or design on the part of the "internals" were unable to attend.

In October 1956, the French Air Force intercepted a Moroccan DC-3 plane bound for Tunis, carrying Ahmed Ben Bella, Mohammed Boudiaf, Mohamed Khider and Hocine Aït Ahmed, and forced it to land in Algiers. Lacoste had the FLN external political leaders arrested and imprisoned for the duration of the war. This action caused the remaining rebel leaders to harden their stance.

France opposed Egyptian President Gamal Abdel Nasser's material and political assistance to the FLN, which some French analysts believed was the revolution's main sustenance. This attitude was a factor in persuading France to participate in the November 1956 attempt to seize the Suez Canal during the Suez Crisis.

In 1957, support for the FLN weakened as the breach between the internals and externals widened. To halt the drift, the FLN expanded its executive committee to include Abbas, as well as imprisoned political leaders such as Ben Bella. It also convinced communist and Arab members of the United Nations (UN) to put diplomatic pressure on the French government to negotiate a cease-fire. In 1957, it became common knowledge in France that the French Army was routinely using torture to extract information from suspected FLN members. Hubert Beuve-Méry, the editor of Le Monde, declared in an edition on 13 March 1957: "From now on, Frenchman must know that they don't have the right to condemn in the same terms as ten years ago the destruction of Oradour and the torture by the Gestapo."

Another case that attracted much media attention was the murder of Maurice Audin, a member of the outlawed Algerian Communist party, mathematics professor at the University of Algiers and a suspected FLN member whom the French Army arrested in June 1957. Audin was tortured and killed and his body was never found. As Audin was French rather than Algerian, his "disappearance" while in the custody of the French Army led to the case becoming a cause célèbre as his widow aided by the historian Pierre Vidal-Naquet determinedly sought to have the men responsible for her husband's death prosecuted.

Existentialist writer, philosopher and playwright Albert Camus, native of Algiers, tried unsuccessfully to persuade both sides to at least leave civilians alone, writing editorials against the use of torture in Combat newspaper. The FLN considered him a fool, and some Pieds-Noirs considered him a traitor. Nevertheless, in his speech when he received the Nobel Prize in Literature, Camus said that when faced with a radical choice he would eventually support his community. This statement made him lose his status among left-wing intellectuals. His widow claimed that Camus, though discreet, was in fact an ardent supporter of French Algeria in the last years of his life.

=== Battle of Algiers ===
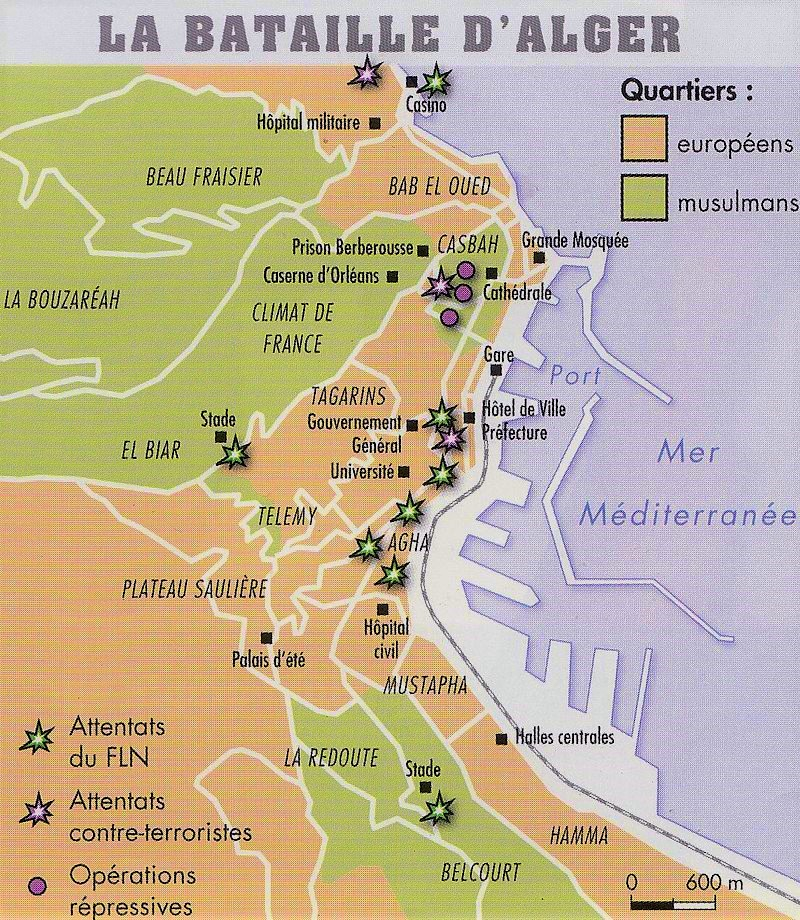
Algiers: Muslim quarters (green), European quarters (orange), terrorist attacks

To increase international and domestic French attention to their struggle, the FLN decided to bring the conflict to the cities, call a nationwide general strike and plant bombs in public places. The Battle of Algiers began on September 30, 1956, when three women, including Djamila Bouhired and Zohra Drif, simultaneously placed bombs at three sites including the downtown office of Air France. The FLN carried out shootings and bombings in the spring of 1957, resulting in civilian casualties and a crushing response from the authorities.

General Jacques Massu was instructed to use whatever methods deemed necessary to restore order in the city and to find and eliminate terrorists. Using paratroopers, he broke the strike and, in the succeeding months, destroyed the FLN infrastructure in Algiers. But the FLN had succeeded in showing its ability to strike at the heart of French Algeria and to assemble a mass response to its demands among urban Muslims.

The publicity given to the brutal methods used by the army to win the Battle of Algiers, including the use of torture, strong movement control and curfew called quadrillage and where all authority was under the military, created doubt in France about its role in Algeria. What was originally "pacification" or a "public order operation" had turned into a colonial war accompanied by torture.

=== Guerrilla war ===
A 1956 newsreel about the war

In 1956 and 1957, the FLN successfully applied hit-and-run tactics in accordance with guerrilla warfare theory. Whilst some of this was aimed at military targets, a significant amount was invested in a terror campaign against those in any way deemed to support or encourage French authority. This resulted in acts of sadistic torture and brutal violence against all, including women and children. Specializing in ambushes and night raids and avoiding direct contact with superior French firepower, the internal forces targeted army patrols, military encampments, police posts, and colonial farms, mines, and factories, as well as transportation and communications facilities. Once an engagement was broken off, the guerrillas merged with the population in the countryside, in accordance with Mao's theories.

Although successfully provoking fear and uncertainty within both communities in Algeria, the revolutionaries' coercive tactics suggested that they had not yet inspired the bulk of the Muslim people to revolt against French colonial rule. Gradually, however, the FLN gained control in certain sectors of the Aurès, the Kabylie, and other mountainous areas around Constantine and south of Algiers and Oran. In these places, the FLN established a simple but effective—although frequently temporary—military administration that was able to collect taxes and food and to recruit manpower. But it was never able to hold large, fixed positions.

The loss of competent field commanders both on the battlefield and through defections and political purges created difficulties for the FLN. Moreover, power struggles in the early years of the war split leadership in the wilayat, particularly in the Aurès. Some officers created their own fiefdoms, using units under their command to settle old scores and engage in private wars against military rivals within the FLN.

=== French counter-insurgency operations ===
Despite complaints from the military command in Algiers, the French government was reluctant for many months to admit that the Algerian situation was out of control and that what was viewed officially as a pacification operation had developed into a war. By 1956, there were more than 400,000 French troops in Algeria. Although the elite airborne infantry units of the Troupes coloniales and the Foreign Legion bore the brunt of offensive counterinsurgency combat operations, approximately 170,000 Muslim Algerians also served in the regular French army, most of them volunteers. France also sent air force and naval units to the Algerian theater, including helicopters. In addition to service as a flying ambulance and cargo carrier, French forces utilized the helicopter for the first time in a ground attack role in order to pursue and destroy fleeing FLN guerrilla units. The American military later used the same helicopter combat methods in the Vietnam War. The French also used napalm.

The French army resumed an important role in local Algerian administration through the Special Administration Section (Section Administrative Spécialisée, SAS), created in 1955. The SAS's mission was to establish contact with the Muslim population and weaken nationalist influence in the rural areas by asserting the "French presence" there. SAS officers—called képis bleus (blue caps)—also recruited and trained bands of loyal Muslim irregulars, known as harkis. Armed with shotguns and using guerrilla tactics similar to those of the FLN, the harkis, who eventually numbered about 180,000 volunteers, more than the FLN activists, were an ideal instrument of counterinsurgency warfare.

Harkis were mostly used in conventional formations, either in all-Algerian units commanded by French officers or in mixed units. Other uses included platoon or smaller size units, attached to French battalions, in a similar way as the Kit Carson Scouts by the U.S. in Vietnam. A third use was an intelligence gathering role, with some reported minor pseudo-operations in support of their intelligence collection. U.S. military expert Lawrence E. Cline stated, "The extent of these pseudo-operations appears to have been very limited both in time and scope. ... The most widespread use of pseudo type operations was during the 'Battle of Algiers' in 1957. The principal French employer of covert agents in Algiers was the Fifth Bureau, the psychological warfare branch. "The Fifth Bureau" made extensive use of 'turned' FLN members, one such network being run by Captain Paul-Alain Leger of the 10th Paras. "Persuaded" to work for the French forces included by the use of torture and threats against their family; these agents "mingled with FLN cadres. They planted incriminating forged documents, spread false rumors of treachery and fomented distrust. ... As a frenzy of throat-cutting and disemboweling broke out among confused and suspicious FLN cadres, nationalist slaughtered nationalist from April to September 1957 and did France's work for her." But this type of operation involved individual operatives rather than organized covert units.

One organized pseudo-guerrilla unit, however, was created in December 1956 by the French DST domestic intelligence agency. The Organization of the French Algerian Resistance (ORAF), a group of counter-terrorists had as its mission to carry out false flag terrorist attacks with the aim of quashing any hopes of political compromise. But it seemed that, as in Indochina, "the French focused on developing native guerrilla groups that would fight against the FLN", one of whom fought in the Southern Atlas Mountains, equipped by the French Army.

The FLN also used pseudo-guerrilla strategies against the French Army on one occasion, with Force K, a group of 1,000 Algerians who volunteered to serve in Force K as guerrillas for the French. But most of these members were either already FLN members or were turned by the FLN once enlisted. Corpses of purported FLN members displayed by the unit were in fact those of dissidents and members of other Algerian groups killed by the FLN. The French Army finally discovered the war ruse and tried to hunt down Force K members. However, some 600 managed to escape and join the FLN with weapons and equipment.

Late in 1957, General Raoul Salan, commanding the French Army in Algeria, instituted a system of quadrillage (surveillance using a grid pattern), dividing the country into sectors, each permanently garrisoned by troops responsible for suppressing rebel operations in their assigned territory. Salan's methods sharply reduced the instances of FLN terrorism but tied down a large number of troops in static defense. Salan also constructed a heavily patrolled system of barriers to limit infiltration from Tunisia and Morocco. The best known of these was the Morice Line (named for the French defense minister, André Morice), which consisted of an electrified fence, barbed wire, and mines over a 320-kilometer stretch of the Tunisian border. Despite ruthless clashes during the Battle of the borders, the ALN failed to penetrate these defence lines.

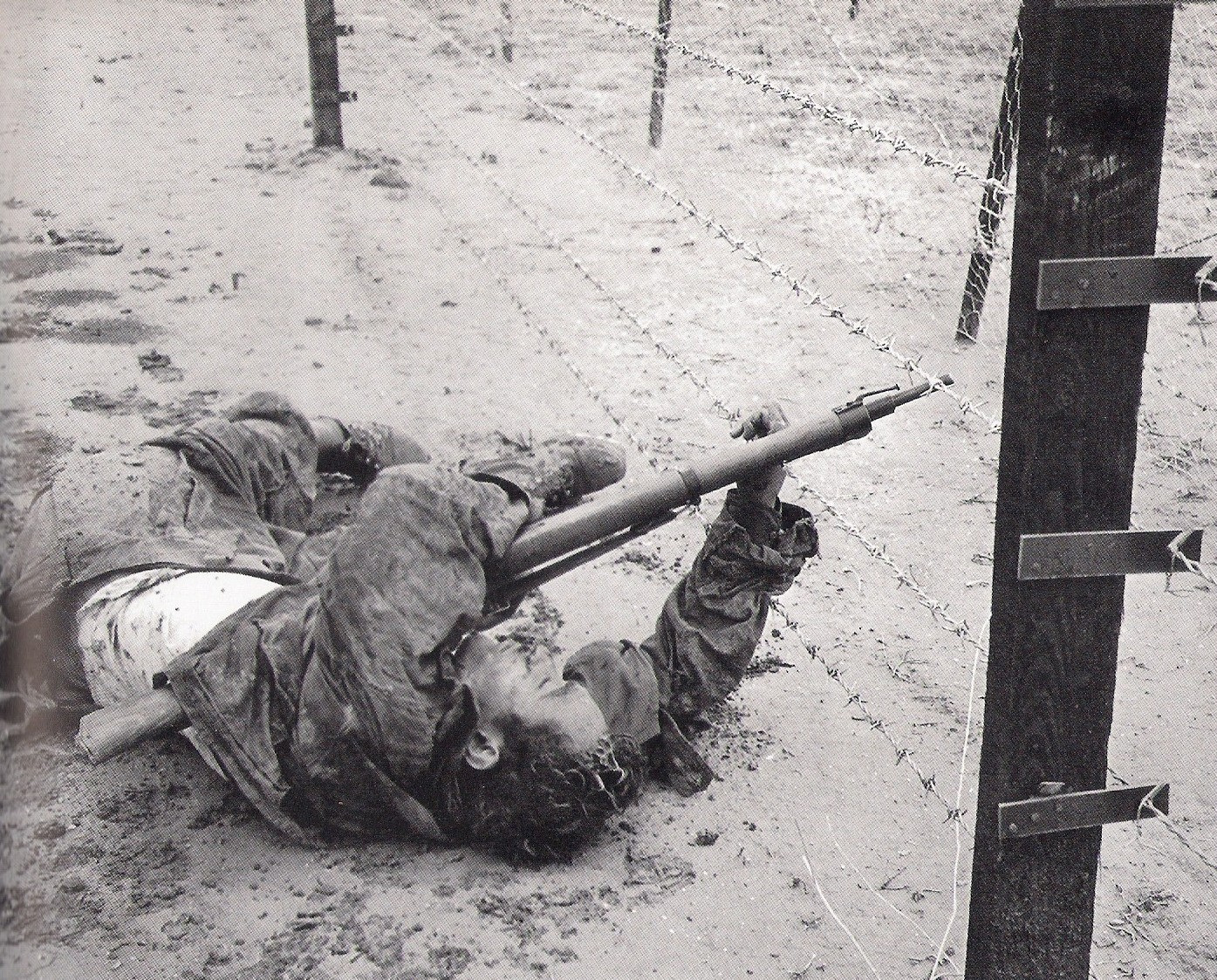
Electrified barriers along the entire length of Algeria's eastern and western borders

The French military command ruthlessly applied the principle of collective responsibility to villages suspected of sheltering, supplying, or in any way cooperating with the guerrillas. Villages that could not be reached by mobile units were subject to aerial bombardment. FLN guerrillas that fled to caves or other remote hiding places were tracked and hunted down. In one episode, FLN guerrillas who refused to surrender and withdraw from a cave complex were dealt with by French Foreign Legion Pioneer troops, who, lacking flamethrowers or explosives, simply bricked up each cave, leaving the residents to die of suffocation. Despite the 1925 Geneva Protocol, France made widespread use of chemical weapons.

Finding it impossible to control all of Algeria's remote farms and villages, the French government also initiated a program of concentrating large segments of the rural population, including whole villages, in camps under military supervision to prevent them from aiding the rebels. In the three years (1957–60) during which the regroupement program was followed, more than 2 million Algerians were removed from their villages, mostly in the mountainous areas, and resettled in the plains, where it was difficult to reestablish their previous economic and social systems. Living conditions in the fortified villages were poor. In hundreds of villages, orchards and croplands not already burned by French troops went to seed for lack of care. These population transfers effectively denied the use of remote villages to FLN guerrillas, who had used them as a source of rations and manpower, but also caused significant resentment on the part of the displaced villagers. Relocation's social and economic disruption continued to be felt a generation later. At the same time, the French tried to gain support from the civilian population by providing money, jobs and housing to farmers

The French Army shifted its tactics at the end of 1958 from dependence on quadrillage to the use of mobile forces deployed on massive search-and-destroy missions against FLN strongholds. In 1959, Salan's successor, General Maurice Challe, appeared to have suppressed major rebel resistance, but political developments had already overtaken the French Army's successes.

=== Fall of the Fourth Republic ===
Recurrent cabinet crises focused attention on the inherent instability of the Fourth Republic and increased the misgivings of the army and of the pieds-noirs that the security of Algeria was being undermined by party politics. Army commanders chafed at what they took to be inadequate and incompetent political initiatives by the government in support of military efforts to end the rebellion. The feeling was widespread that another debacle like that of Indochina in 1954 was in the offing and that the government would order another precipitate pullout and sacrifice French honor to political expediency. Many saw in de Gaulle, who had not held office since 1946, the only public figure capable of rallying the nation and giving direction to the French government.

After his time as governor general, Soustelle returned to France to organize support for de Gaulle's return to power, while retaining close ties to the army and the pieds-noirs. By early 1958, he had organized a coup d'état, bringing together dissident army officers and pieds-noirs with sympathetic Gaullists. An army junta under Massu seized power in Algiers on the night of May 13, thereafter known as the May 1958 crisis. General Salan assumed leadership of a Committee of Public Safety formed to replace the civil authority and pressed the junta's demands that de Gaulle be named by French president René Coty to head a government of national unity invested with extraordinary powers to prevent the "abandonment of Algeria".

On May 24, French paratroopers from the Algerian corps landed on Corsica, taking the French island in a bloodless action. Subsequently, preparations were made in Algeria for Operation Resurrection, which had as its objectives the seizure of Paris and the removal of the French government. Resurrection was to be implemented in the event of one of three following scenarios: were de Gaulle not approved as leader of France by the parliament; were de Gaulle to ask for military assistance to take power; or if it seemed that communist forces were making any move to take power in France. De Gaulle was approved by the French parliament on May 29, by 329 votes against 224, 15 hours before the projected launch of Operation Resurrection. This indicated that the Fourth Republic by 1958 no longer had any support from the French Army in Algeria and was at its mercy even in civilian political matters. This decisive shift in the balance of power in civil-military relations in France in 1958, and the threat of force, was the primary factor in the return of de Gaulle to power in France.

=== De Gaulle ===
Many people, regardless of citizenship, greeted de Gaulle's return to power as the breakthrough needed to end the hostilities. On his trip to Algeria on 4 June 1958, de Gaulle calculatedly made an ambiguous and broad emotional appeal to all the inhabitants, declaring, "Je vous ai compris" ("I have understood you"). De Gaulle raised the hopes of the pied-noir and the professional military, disaffected by the indecisiveness of previous governments, with his exclamation of "Vive l'Algérie française" ("Long live French Algeria") to cheering crowds in Mostaganem. At the same time, he proposed economic, social, and political reforms to improve the situation of the Muslims. Nonetheless, de Gaulle later admitted to having harbored deep pessimism about the outcome of the Algerian situation even then. Meanwhile, he looked for a "third force" among the population of Algeria, uncontaminated by the FLN or the "ultras" (colon extremists), through whom a solution might be found.

De Gaulle immediately appointed a committee to draft a new constitution for France's Fifth Republic, which would be declared early the next year, with which Algeria would be associated but of which it would not form an integral part. All Muslims, including women, were registered for the first time on electoral rolls to participate in a referendum to be held on the new constitution in September 1958.

De Gaulle's initiative threatened the FLN with decreased support among Muslims. In reaction, the FLN set up the Provisional Government of the Algerian Republic (Gouvernement Provisoire de la République Algérienne, GPRA), a government-in-exile headed by Abbas and based in Tunis. Before the referendum, Abbas lobbied for international support for the GPRA, which was quickly recognized by Morocco, Tunisia, China, and several other African, Arab, and Asian countries, but not by the Soviet Union.

In February 1959, de Gaulle was elected president of the new Fifth Republic. He visited Constantine in October to announce a program to end the war and create an Algeria closely linked to France. De Gaulle's call on the rebel leaders to end hostilities and to participate in elections was met with adamant refusal. "The problem of a cease-fire in Algeria is not simply a military problem", said the GPRA's Abbas. "It is essentially political, and negotiation must cover the whole question of Algeria." Secret discussions that had been underway were broken off.

In early 1959, France launched the Challe Plan, regaining control over large parts of northern Algeria and inflicting heavy damage upon separatist troops. Colonel Bigeard, whose elite paratrooper unit fought at Dien Bien Phu in 1954, told journalist Jean Lartéguy, (source)

We are not making war for ourselves, not making a colonialist war, Bigeard wears no shirt (he shows his opened uniform) as do my officers. We are fighting right here right now for them, for the evolution, to see the evolution of these people and this war is for them. We are defending their freedom as we are, in my opinion, defending the West's freedom. We are here ambassadors, Crusaders, who are hanging on in order to still be able to talk and to be able to speak for.

— Col. Bigeard (July 1959)

During this period in France, however, popular opposition to the conflict was growing, notably in the French Communist Party, then one of the country's strongest political forces, which supported the Algerian Revolution. Thousands of relatives of conscripts and reserve soldiers suffered loss and pain; revelations of torture and the indiscriminate brutality of the army against the Muslim population prompted widespread revulsion, and a significant constituency supported the principle of national liberation. By 1959, it was clear that the status quo was untenable and France could either grant Algeria independence or allow real equality with the Muslims. De Gaulle told an advisor: "If we integrate them, if all the Arabs and the Berbers of Algeria were considered French, how could they be prevented from settling in France, where the living standard is so much higher? My village would no longer be called Colombey-les-Deux-Églises but Colombey-les-Deux-Mosquées".

International pressure was also building on France to grant Algeria independence. Since 1955, the UN General Assembly annually considered the Algerian question, and the FLN position was gaining support. France's seeming intransigence in settling a colonial war that tied down half the manpower of its armed forces was also a source of concern to its North Atlantic Treaty Organization allies. In a 16 September 1959 statement, de Gaulle dramatically reversed his stand and uttered the words "self-determination" as the third and preferred solution, which he envisioned as leading to majority rule in an Algeria formally associated with France. In Tunis, Abbas acknowledged that de Gaulle's statement might be accepted as a basis for settlement, but the French government refused to recognize the GPRA as the representative of Algeria's Muslim community.

=== Week of barricades ===
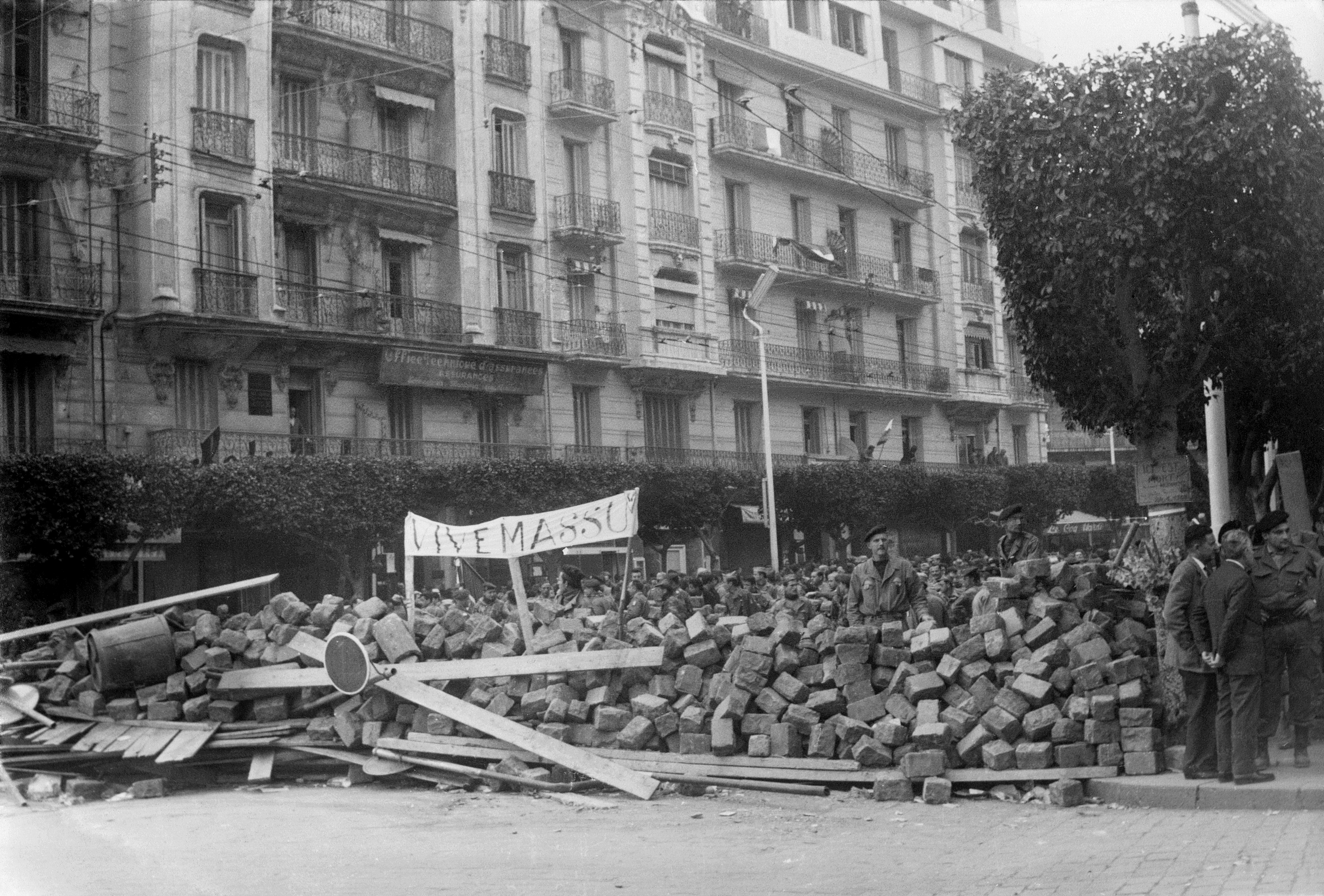
Barricades in Algiers, January 1960. The banner reads: "Long live Massu" (Vive Massu).

Convinced that de Gaulle had betrayed them, some units of European volunteers (Unités Territoriales) in Algiers led by student leaders Pierre Lagaillarde and Jean-Jacques Susini, café owner Joseph Ortiz, and lawyer Jean-Baptiste Biaggi staged an insurrection in the Algerian capital starting on 24 January 1960, and known in France as La semaine des barricades 'the week of barricades'. The ultras incorrectly believed that they would be supported by Massu. The insurrection order was given by Colonel Jean Garde of the Fifth Bureau. As the army, police, and supporters stood by, civilian pieds-noirs threw up barricades in the streets and seized government buildings. General Maurice Challe, responsible for the army in Algeria, declared Algiers under siege, but forbade the troops to fire on the insurgents. Nevertheless, six rioters were killed during shooting on Boulevard Laferrière.

In Paris on 29 January 1960, de Gaulle called on his ineffective army to remain loyal and rallied popular support for his Algerian policy in a televised address:

I took, in the name of France, the following decision—the Algerians will have the free choice of their destiny. When, in one way or another – by ceasefire or by complete crushing of the rebels – we will have put an end to the fighting, when, after a prolonged period of appeasement, the population will have become conscious of the stakes and, thanks to us, realised the necessary progress in political, economic, social, educational, and other domains. Then it will be the Algerians who will tell us what they want to be.... Your French of Algeria, how can you listen to the liars and the conspirators who tell you that, if you grant free choice to the Algerians, France and de Gaulle want to abandon you, retreat from Algeria, and deliver you to the rebellion?.... I say to all of our soldiers: your mission comprises neither equivocation nor interpretation. You have to liquidate the rebellious forces, which want to oust France from Algeria and impose on this country its dictatorship of misery and sterility.... Finally, I address myself to France. Well, well, my dear and old country, here we face together, once again, a serious ordeal. In virtue of the mandate that the people have given me and of the national legitimacy, which I have embodied for 20 years, I ask everyone to support me whatever happens.

Most of the Army heeded his call, and the siege of Algiers ended on 1 February with Lagaillarde surrendering to General Challe's command of the French Army in Algeria. The loss of many ultra leaders who were imprisoned or transferred to other areas did not deter the French Algeria militants. Sent to prison in Paris and then paroled, Lagaillarde fled to Spain. There, with another French army officer, Raoul Salan, who had entered clandestinely, and with Jean-Jacques Susini, he created the Organisation armée secrète (Secret Army Organization, OAS) on December 3, 1960, with the purpose of continuing the fight for French Algeria. Highly organized and well-armed, the OAS stepped up its terrorist activities, which were directed against both Algerians and pro-government French citizens, as the move toward negotiated settlement of the war and self-determination gained momentum. To the FLN rebellion against France were added civil wars between extremists in the two communities and between the ultras and the French government in Algeria.

Beside Pierre Lagaillarde, Jean-Baptiste Biaggi was also imprisoned, while Alain de Sérigny was arrested, and Joseph Ortiz's FNF dissolved, as well as General Lionel Chassin's MP-13. De Gaulle also modified the government, excluding Jacques Soustelle, believed to be too pro-French Algeria, and granting the Minister of Information to Louis Terrenoire, who quit RTF (French broadcasting TV). Pierre Messmer, who had been a member of the Foreign Legion, was named Minister of Defense, and dissolved the Fifth Bureau, the psychological warfare branch, which had ordered the rebellion. These units had theorized the principles of a counter-revolutionary war, including the use of torture. During the Indochina War (1947–54), officers such as Roger Trinquier and Lionel-Max Chassin were inspired by Mao Zedong's strategic doctrine and acquired knowledge of convincing the population to support the fight. The officers were initially trained in the Centre d'instruction et de préparation à la contre-guérilla (Arzew). Jacques Chaban-Delmas added to that the Centre d'entraînement à la guerre subversive Jeanne-d'Arc (Center of Training to Subversive War Joan of Arc) in Philippeville, Algeria, directed by Colonel Marcel Bigeard.

The French army officers' uprising was due to a perceived second betrayal by the government, the first having been in the Indochina of 1947–1954. They felt that during that war, the Dien Bien Phu garrison was sacrificed with no metropolitan support, and that commanding officer General de Castries was ordered to "let the affair die of its own, in serenity" ("laissez mourir l'affaire d'elle même en sérénité").

The opposition of the UNEF student trade-union to the participation of conscripts in the war led to a secession in May 1960, with the creation of the Fédération des étudiants nationalistes (FEN, Federation of Nationalist Students) around Dominique Venner, a former member of Jeune Nation and of MP13, François d'Orcival, and Alain de Benoist, who would theorize in the 1980s the "New Right" movement. The FEN then published the Manifeste de la classe 60.

A Front national pour l'Algérie française (FNAF, National Front for French Algeria) was created in June 1960 in Paris, gathering around de Gaulle's former Secretary Jacques Soustelle, Claude Dumont, Georges Sauge, Yvon Chautard, Jean-Louis Tixier-Vignancour (who later competed in the 1965 presidential election), Jacques Isorni, Victor Barthélemy, François Brigneau and Jean-Marie Le Pen. Another ultra rebellion occurred in December 1960, which led de Gaulle to dissolve the FNAF.

After the publication of the Manifeste des 121 against the use of torture and the war, the opponents to the war created the Rassemblement de la gauche démocratique (Assembly of the Democratic Left), which included the French Section of the Workers' International (SFIO) socialist party, the Radical-Socialist Party, Force ouvrière (FO) trade union, Confédération Française des Travailleurs Chrétiens trade-union, UNEF trade-union, etc., which supported de Gaulle against the ultras.

=== End of the war ===
De Gaulle held the first referendum on the self-determination of Algeria on 8 January 1961. 75% of the voters (both in France and Algeria) approved, and de Gaulle's government began secret peace negotiations with the FLN. In the Algerian départements 69.51% voted in favor of self-determination. The talks that began in March 1961 broke down when de Gaulle insisted on including the much smaller Mouvement national algérien (MNA), which the FLN objected to. Since the FLN was the by far stronger movement with the MNA almost wiped out by this time, the French were finally forced to exclude the MNA from the talks after the FLN walked out for a time.

The generals' putsch on 22 April 1961, aimed at canceling the government's negotiations with the FLN, compelled a major change in the official attitude toward the Algerian war. Leading the coup attempt to depose de Gaulle were generals Raoul Salan, André Zeller, Maurice Challe, and Edmond Jouhaud. Only the paratroop divisions and the Foreign Legion joined the coup, while the Air Force, Navy and most of the Army stayed loyal. Still, on 23 April de Gaulle went on French television to denounce the coup. The normally lofty de Gaulle ended by saying "Frenchmen, Frenchwomen, help me!" De Gaulle was now prepared to abandon the Pied-Noirs, which no previous French government was willing to do. The army had been discredited by the putsch and kept a low profile politically throughout the rest of France's involvement with Algeria. The OAS was to be the main standard bearer for the Pied-Noirs for the rest of the war.

Universal Newsreel about the 1962 cease fire

Talks with the FLN reopened at Évian in May 1961; after several false starts, the French government decreed that a ceasefire would take effect on 18 March 1962. A major difficulty at the talks was de Gaulle's decision to grant independence only to the coastal regions of Algeria, where the bulk of the population lived, while hanging onto the Sahara, which happened to be rich in oil and gas, while the FLN claimed all of Algeria. During the talks, the Pied-Noirs and Muslim communities engaged in a low level civil war with bombings, shootings, throat-cutting, and assassinations being the preferred methods. The Canadian historian John Cairns wrote at times it seemed like both communities were "going berserk" as everyday "murder was indiscriminate".

On 29 June 1961, de Gaulle announced on TV that fighting was "virtually finished" and afterwards there were no major battles between the French Army and the FLN. During the summer of 1961 the OAS and the FLN engaged in a civil war, in which the greater numbers of the Muslims predominated. To pressure de Gaulle to give up claims to the Sahara, the FLN organized demonstrations by Algerians living in France during the fall of 1961, which the French police crushed. At a demonstration on 17 October 1961, Maurice Papon ordered an attack that became a massacre of Algerians. On 10 January 1962, the FLN started a "general offensive" to pressure the OAS in Algeria, staging a series of attacks on the Pied-Noirs communities. On 7 February 1962, the OAS attempted to assassinate Culture Minister André Malraux with a bomb in his apartment building; it failed to kill him, but left a four-year-old girl in the adjoining apartment blinded by shrapnel. The incident did much to turn French opinion against the OAS.

On 20 February 1962, a peace accord was reached granting independence to all of Algeria. In their final form, the Évian Accords allowed the Pied-Noirs equal legal protection with Algerians over a three-year period. These rights included respect for property, participation in public affairs, and a full range of civil and cultural rights. At the end of that period, however, all Algerian residents would be obliged to become Algerian citizens or be classified as aliens with the attendant loss of rights. The agreement also allowed France to establish military bases in Algeria even after independence (including the nuclear test site of Regghane, the naval base of Mers-el-Kebir and the air base of Bou Sfer) and to have privileges vis-à-vis Algerian oil.

The OAS started a campaign of spectacular terrorist attacks to sabotage the Évian Accords, hoping that if enough Muslims were killed, a general pogrom against the Pied-Noirs would break out, leading the French Army to turn its guns against the government. Despite ample provocation with OAS lobbing mortar shells into the casbah of Algiers, the FLN gave orders for no retaliatory attacks. In the spring of 1962, the OAS turned to bank robbery to finance its war against both the FLN and the French state, and bombed special units sent by Paris to hunt them down. Only eighty deputies voted against the Évian Accords in the National Assembly. Cairns wrote that the fulminations of Jean-Marie Le Pen against de Gaulle were only "...the traditional verbal excesses of third-rate firebrands without a substantial following and without a constructive idea".

Following the cease fire, tensions developed between the Pied-Noirs community and their former protectors in the French Army. An OAS ambush of French troops on 20 March was followed by 20,000 gendarmes and soldiers being ordered to occupy the predominantly-Pied-Noir district of Bab El Oued in Algiers. A week later, French soldiers from the 4th Tirailleur Regiment (an 80% Muslim unit with French officers) fired on a crowd of Pied-Noir demonstrators in Algiers, killing between 50 and 80 civilians. Total casualties in these three incidents were 326 killed and wounded amongst the Pied-Noirs and 110 French military personnel dead or injured. A journalist who saw the massacre on 26 March 1962, Henry Tanner, described the scene: "When the shooting stopped, the street was littered with bodies, of women, as well as men, dead, wounded or dying. The black pavement looked grey, as if bleached by fire. Crumpled French flags were lying in pools of blood. Shattered glass and spent cartridges were everywhere". A number of shocked Pied-Noir screamed that they were not French anymore. One woman screamed "Stop firing! My God, we're French..." before she was shot down. The massacre served to greatly embitter the Pied-Noir community and led to a massive surge of support for the OAS.

In the second referendum on the independence of Algeria, held in April 1962, 91 percent of the French electorate approved the Evian Accords. On 1 July 1962, some 6 million of a total Algerian electorate of 6.5 million cast their ballots. The vote was nearly unanimous, with 5,992,115 votes for independence, 16,534 against, with most Pied-Noirs and Harkis either having fled or abstaining. De Gaulle pronounced Algeria an independent country on 3 July. The Provisional Executive, however, proclaimed 5 July, the 132nd anniversary of the French entry into Algeria, as the day of national independence.

During the three months between the cease-fire and the French referendum on Algeria, the OAS unleashed a new campaign. The OAS sought to provoke a major breach in the ceasefire by the FLN, but the attacks now were aimed also against the French army and police enforcing the accords as well as against Muslims. It was the most wanton carnage that Algeria had witnessed in eight years of savage warfare. OAS operatives set off an average of 120 bombs per day in March, with targets including hospitals and schools. On 7 June 1962, the University of Algiers Library was burned by the OAS, an event memorialized in postage stamps issued by a number of Muslim countries.

During the summer of 1962, a rush of Pied-Noirs fled to France. Within a year, 1.4 million refugees, including almost the entire Jewish community, had joined the exodus. Despite the declaration of independence on 5 July 1962, the last French forces did not leave the naval base of Mers El Kébir until 1967. (The Evian Accords had permitted France to maintain its military presence for fifteen years, so the withdrawal in 1967 was significantly ahead of schedule.) Cairns writing from Paris in 1962 declared: "In some ways the last year has been the worse. Tension has never been higher. Disenchantment in France at least has never been greater. The mindless cruelty of it all has never been more absurd and savage. This last year, stretching from the hopeful spring of 1961 to the ceasefire of 18 March 1962 spanned a season of shadow boxing, false threats, capitulation and murderous hysteria. French Algeria died badly. Its agony was marked by panic and brutality as ugly as the record of European imperialism could show. In the spring of 1962 the unhappy corpse of empire still shuddered and lashed out and stained itself in fratricide. The whole episode of its death, measured at least seven and half years, constituted perhaps the most pathetic and sordid event in the entire history of colonialism. It is hard to see how anybody of importance in the tangled web of the conflict came out looking well. Nobody won the conflict, nobody dominated it."

== Strategy of internationalisation of the Algerian War led by the FLN ==
At the beginning of the war, on the Algerian side, it was necessary to compensate for military weakness with political and diplomatic struggle. In the asymmetric conflict between France and the FLN at this time, victory seemed extremely difficult.

The Algerian revolution began with the insurrection of November 1, when the FLN organized a series of attacks against the French army and military infrastructure, and published a statement calling on Algerians to get involved in the revolution. This initial campaign had limited impact: the events remained largely unreported, especially by the French press (only two newspaper columns in Le Monde and one in l'Express), and the insurrection all but subsided. Nevertheless, François Mitterrand, then French Minister of the Interior, sent 600 soldiers to Algeria.

The FLN was weak militarily at the beginning of the war. It was created in 1954 and had few members, and its armed wing the ALN was also underdeveloped, having only 3,000 men badly equipped and trained, unable to compete with the French army. The nationalist forces also suffered from internal divisions.

As proclaimed in the statement of 1954, the FLN developed a strategy to avoid large-scale warfare and internationalize the conflict, appealing politically and diplomatically to influence French and world opinion. This political aspect would reinforce the legitimacy of the FLN in Algeria, which was all the more necessary since Algeria, unlike other colonies, had been formally incorporated as a part of metropolitan France. The French counter-strategy aimed to keep the conflict internal and strictly French to maintain its image abroad. The FLN succeeded, and the conflict rapidly became international, embroiled with the tensions of the Cold War and the emergence of the Third World.

Firstly, the FLN exploited the tensions between the American-led Western Bloc and the Soviet-led Communist bloc. FLN sought material support from the communists, goading the Americans to support Algerian independence to keep the country on the western side. Furthermore, the FLN used the tensions within each bloc, including between France and the US and between the USSR and Mao's China. The United States, which generally opposed colonisation, had every interest in pushing France to give Algeria its independence.

Secondly, the FLN could count on Third World support. After World War II, many new states were created in the wave of decolonization: in 1945 there were 51 states in the United Nations, but by 1965 there were 117. This upturned the balance of power in the UN, with the recently decolonized countries now a majority with great influence. Most of the new states were part of the Third-World movement, proclaiming a third, non-aligned path in a bipolar world, and opposing colonialism in favor of national renewal and modernization. They felt concerned in the Algerian conflict and supported the FLN on the international stage. For example, a few days after the first insurrection in 1954, Radio Yugoslavia (Third-Worldist) begun to vocally support the struggle of Algeria; the 1955 Bandung conference internationally recognized the FLN as representing Algeria; and Third-World countries brought up the Algerian conflict at the UN general assembly. The French government grew more and more isolated.

After the Battle of Algiers greatly weakened the FLN, it was forced to accept more direct support from abroad. Financial and military support from China helped to rebuild the ALN to 20,000 men. The Soviet Union competed with China, and Nikita Khrushchev intensified moral support for the Algerian rebellion, which in turn pushed the United States to react. In 1958, the Provisional Government of the Algerian Republic (PGAR) was created, naming official representatives to negotiate with France. Tense negotiations lasted three years, eventually turning to Algeria's advantage. The PGAR was supported by the Third World and the communist bloc, while France had few allies. Under pressure from the UN, the USA, and a war-weary public, France eventually conceded in the Evian agreements. According to Matthew Connelly, this strategy of internationalization became a model for other revolutionary groups such as the Palestine Liberation Organization of Yasser Arafat, and the African National Congress of Nelson Mandela. The FLN also received arms and financial support from the Swiss Nazi financier François Genoud.

== Role of women ==
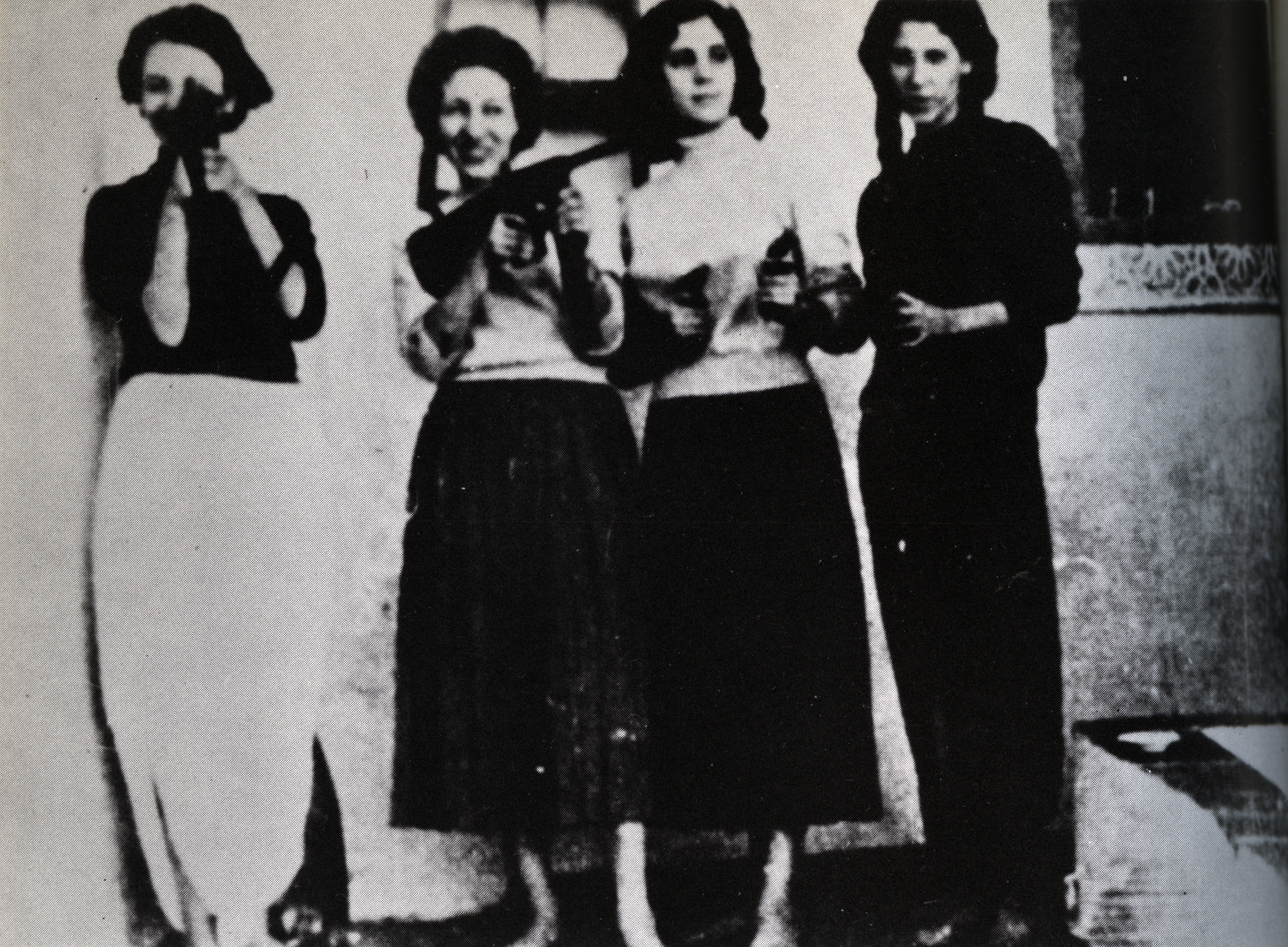
FLN female bombers

Women participated in a variety of roles during the Algerian War. The majority of Muslim women who became active participants did so on the side of the National Liberation Front (FLN). The French included some women, both Muslim and French, in their war effort, but they were not as fully integrated, nor were they charged with the same breadth of tasks as the women on the Algerian side. The total number of women involved in the conflict, as determined by post-war veteran registration, is numbered at 11,000, but it is possible that this number was significantly higher due to underreporting.

Urban and rural women's experiences in the revolution differed greatly. Urban women, who constituted about twenty percent of the overall force, had received some kind of education and usually chose to enter on the side of the FLN of their own accord. Largely illiterate rural women, on the other hand, the remaining eighty percent, due to their geographic location in respect to the operations of FLN often became involved in the conflict as a result of proximity paired with force.

Women operated in a number of different areas during the course of the rebellion. "Women participated actively as combatants, spies, fundraisers, as well as nurses, launderers, and cooks", "women assisted the male fighting forces in areas like transportation, communication and administration" the range of involvement by a woman could include both combatant and non-combatant roles. Eveline Safir Lavalette was a notable contributor to the Revolution as a distributor of pamphlets for the FLN's underground newspaper. While most women's tasks were non-combatant, their less frequent, violent acts were more noticed. The reality was that "rural women in maquis rural areas support networks" contained the overwhelming majority of those who participated; female combatants were in the minority.

Perhaps the most famous incident involving Algerian women revolutionaries was the Milk Bar Café bombing of 1956, when Zohra Drif and Yacef Saâdi planted three bombs: one in the Air France office in the Mauritania building in Algiers, which did not explode, one in a cafeteria on the Rue Michelet, and another at the Milk Bar Café, which killed three young women and injured multiple adults and children. Algerian Communist Party member Raymonde Peschard was initially accused of being an accomplice to the bombing and was forced to flee from the colonial authorities. In September 1957, though, Drif and Saâdi were arrested and sentenced to twenty years hard labor in the Barbarossa prison. Drif was pardoned by Charles de Gaulle when Algeria gained independence in 1962.

== Exodus of the Pieds-noirs and Harkis ==
Pieds-noirs (including indigenous Mizrachi and Sephardi Jews) and Harkis accounted for 13% of the total population of Algeria in 1962. For the sake of clarity, each group's exodus is described separately here, although their fate shared many common elements.

=== Pieds-noirs ===
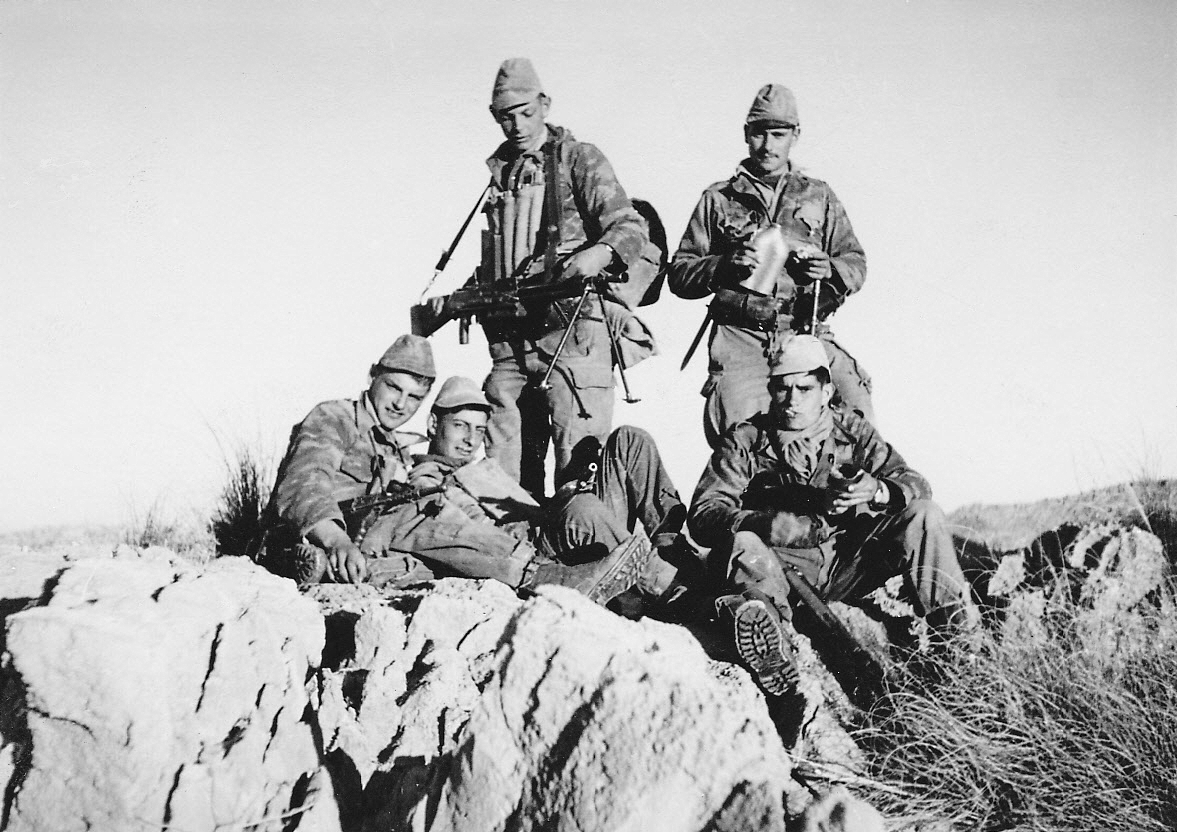
Commandos de Chasse of the 4th Zouave regiment. Zouave regiments were mostly composed of European settlers.

Pied-noir (literally "black foot") is a term used to name the European-descended population (mostly Catholic), who had resided in Algeria for generations; it is sometimes used to include the indigenous Maghrebi Jewish population as well, which likewise emigrated after 1962. Europeans arrived in Algeria as immigrants from all over the western Mediterranean (particularly France, Spain, Italy and Malta), starting in 1830. The Jews arrived in several waves, some coming as early as 600 BC and during the Roman period, known as the Maghrebi Jews or Berber Jews. The Maghrebi Jewish population was outnumbered by the Sephardic Jews, who were driven out of Spain in 1492, and was further strengthened by Marrano refugees from the Spanish Inquisition through the 16th century. Algerian Jews largely embraced French citizenship after the décret Crémieux in 1871.

In 1959, the pieds-noirs numbered 1,025,000 (85% of European Christian descent, and 15% were made up of the indigenous Algerian population of Maghrebi and Sephardi Jewish descent), and accounted for 10.4% of the total population of Algeria. In just a few months in 1962, 900,000 of them fled, the first third prior to the referendum, in the largest relocation of population to Europe since the Second World War. A motto used in the FLN message to the pieds-noirs was "a suitcase or a coffin" ("La valise ou le cercueil"), repurposing a slogan first coined years earlier by pied-noir "ultras" when rallying the European community to their hardcore line.

The French government claimed not to have anticipated such a massive exodus; it estimated that a maximum of 250–300,000 might enter metropolitan France temporarily. Nothing was planned for their move to France, and many had to sleep in the streets or abandoned farms on their arrival. A minority of departing pieds-noirs, including soldiers, destroyed their property before departure, to protest and as a desperate symbolic attempt to leave no trace of over a century of European presence, but the vast majority of their goods and houses were left intact and abandoned. A large number of panicked people camped for weeks on the docks of Algerian harbors, waiting for a space on a boat to France. About 100,000 pieds-noirs chose to remain, but most of those gradually left in the 1960s and 1970s, primarily due to residual hostility against them, including machine-gunning of public places in Oran.

=== Harkis ===
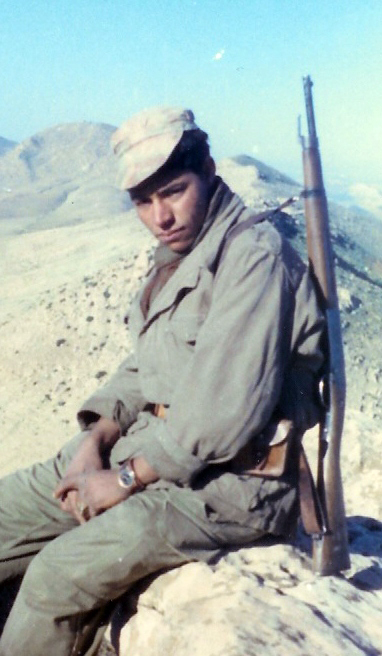
Young Harki in uniform, summer 1961

The so-called Harkis, from the Algerian-Arabic dialect word harki (soldier), were indigenous Muslim Algerians (as opposed to European-descended Catholics or indigenous Algerian Maghrebi Jews) who fought as auxiliaries on the French side. Some of these were veterans of the Free French Forces who participated in the liberation of France during World War II or in the Indochina War. The term also came to broadly include civilian indigenous Algerians who supported a French Algeria. According to French government figures, there were 236,000 Algerian Muslims serving in the French Army in 1962 (four times more than in the FLN), either in regular units (Spahis and Tirailleurs) or as irregulars (harkis and moghaznis). Some estimates suggest that, with their families, the indigenous Muslim loyalists may have numbered as many as 1 million.

In 1962, around 90,000 Harkis took refuge in France, despite French government policy against this. Pierre Messmer, Minister of the Armies, and Louis Joxe, Minister for Algerian Affairs, gave orders to this effect. Harkis lacked civil rights and were often kept in 'temporary' concentration camps and are to this day barely spoken about or integrated in French society, though the Jacques Chirac administration made efforts to recognize their suffering and advance integration, In September of 2021, President Emmanuel Macron asked for forgiveness from Harkis for French mistreatment and abandonment.

The Harkis are seen as traitors by many Algerians, and many of those who stayed behind suffered severe reprisals after independence. Harkis are compared to French Nazi sympathizers and are barred from revisiting Algeria. French historians estimate that somewhere between 50,000 and 150,000 Harkis and members of their families were killed by the FLN or by lynch mobs in Algeria, often in atrocious circumstances or after torture.

== Death toll ==
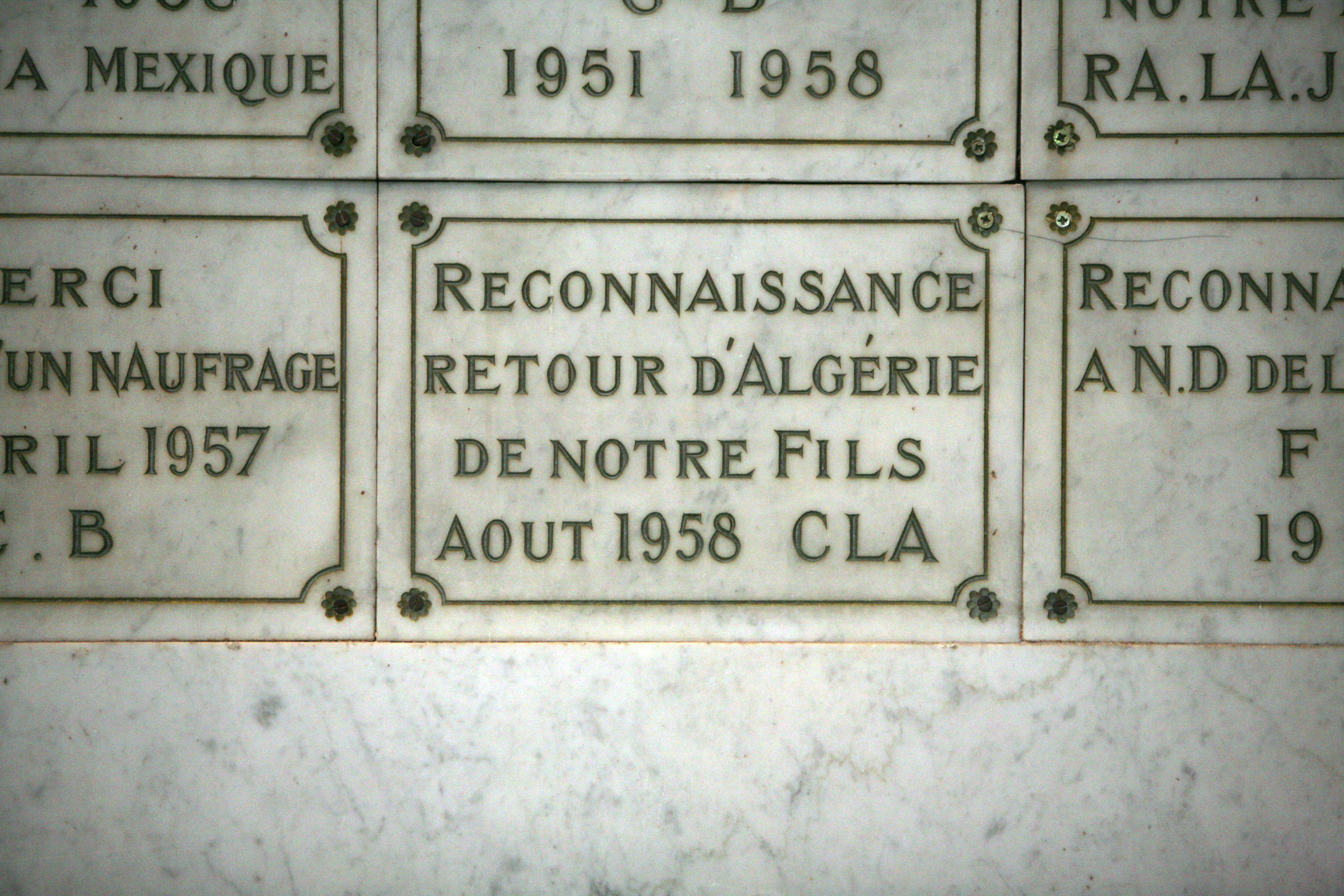
Ex-voto in Notre-Dame de la Garde thanking for the safe return of a son from Algeria, August 1958

Death toll estimates vary. Algerian historians and the FLN estimated that nearly eight years of revolution caused 1.5 million Algerian deaths. Some other French and Algerian sources later put the figure at approximately 960,000 dead, while French officials and historians estimated it at around 350,000, but this was regarded by many as an underestimate. French military authorities listed their losses at nearly 17,456 dead (5,966 from accidents) and 65,000 wounded. European-descended civilian casualties exceeded 10,000 (including 3,000 dead) in 42,000 recorded violent incidents. According to French official figures during the war, the army, security forces and militias killed 141,000 presumed rebel combatants. But it is still unclear whether this includes some civilians.

More than 12,000 Algerians died in internal FLN purges during the war. In France, an additional 5,000 died in the "café wars" between the FLN and rival Algerian groups. French sources also estimated that 70,000 Muslim civilians were killed, or abducted and presumed killed, by the FLN.

Martin Evans citing Gilert Meyinier implies at least 55,000 to up to 60,000 non-Harki Algerian civilians were killed during the conflict without specifying which side killed them. Rudolph Rummel attributes at least 100,000 deaths in what he calls democide to French repression; and estimates an additional 50,000 to 150,000 to democides committed by Algerian independence fighters. 6,000 to 20,000 Algerians were killed in the 1945 Sétif and Guelma massacre which is considered by some historians to have been a cause of the war.

Horne estimated Algerian casualties during the span of eight years to be around 1 million. Uncounted thousands of Muslim civilians died in French Army ratissages, bombing raids, or vigilante reprisals. The war uprooted more than 2 million Algerians, who were forced to relocate in French camps or to flee into the Algerian hinterland, where many thousands died of starvation, disease, and exposure. One source estimates 300,000 Algerian civilians perished of starvation, depredation, and disease inside and outside the camps.

In addition, large numbers of Harkis were murdered when the FLN settled accounts after independence, with 30,000 to 150,000 killed in Algeria in post-war reprisals.

== Lasting effects in Algerian politics ==
After Algeria's independence was recognised, Ahmed Ben Bella quickly became more popular and thereby more powerful. In June 1962, he challenged the leadership of Premier Benyoucef Ben Khedda; this led to several disputes among his rivals in the FLN, which were quickly suppressed by Ben Bella's rapidly growing support, most notably within the armed forces. By September, Bella was in de facto control of Algeria and was elected premier in a one-sided election on September 20, and was recognised by the U.S. on September 29. Algeria was admitted as the 109th member of the United Nations on October 8, 1962. Afterward, Ben Bella declared that Algeria would follow a neutral course in world politics; within a week he met with U.S. President John F. Kennedy, requesting more aid for Algeria with Fidel Castro and expressed approval of Castro's demands for the abandonment of Guantanamo Bay. Bella returned to Algeria and requested that France withdraw from its bases there. In November, his government banned political parties, providing that the FLN would be the only party allowed to function overtly. Shortly thereafter, in 1965, Bella was deposed and placed under house arrest (and later exiled) by Houari Boumédiènne, who served as president until his death in 1978. Algeria remained stable, though in a one-party state, until a violent civil war broke out in the 1990s.

For Algerians of many political factions, the legacy of their War of Independence was a legitimization or even sanctification of the unrestricted use of force in achieving a goal deemed to be justified. Once invoked against foreign colonialists, the same principle could also be turned with relative ease against fellow Algerians. The FLN's struggle to overthrow colonial rule and the ruthlessness exhibited by both sides in that struggle were mirrored 30 years later by the passion, determination, and brutality of the conflict between the FLN government and the Islamist opposition. The American journalist Adam Shatz wrote that much of the same methods employed by the FLN against the French such as "the militarization of politics, the use of Islam as a rallying cry, the exaltation of jihad" to create an essentially secular state in 1962, were used by Islamic fundamentalists in their efforts to overthrow the FLN regime in the 1990s.

== Atrocities and war crimes ==
=== French atrocities and use of torture ===
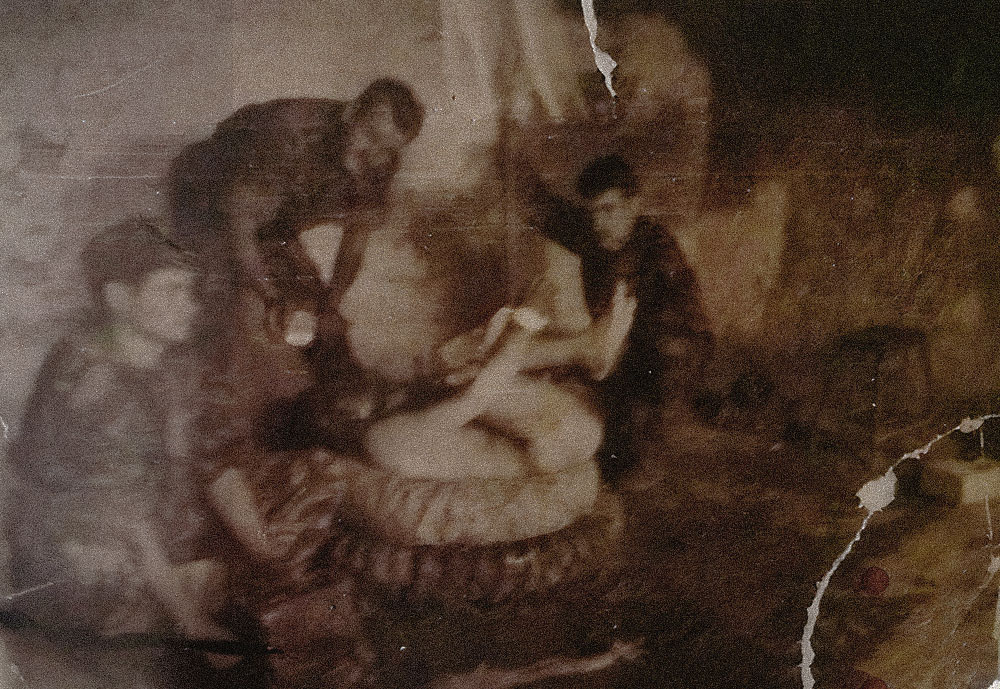
Algerian submerged in water and tortured by the French army using electricity, while two tires serve as containers (1961)

Massacres and torture were frequent from the beginning of the colonization of Algeria, which started in 1830. Atrocities committed against Algerians by the French army during the war included indiscriminate shootings into civilian crowds (such as during the 1961 Paris massacre), execution of civilians when rebel attacks occurred, bombings of villages suspected of helping the FLN, rape, disembowelment of pregnant women, imprisonment without food in small cells (some of which were small enough to impede lying down), throwing detainees from helicopters and into the sea with concrete on their feet, and burying people alive. Torture methods included beatings, mutilations, burning, hanging by the feet or hands, torture by electroshock, waterboarding, sleep deprivation and sexual assaults.

During the war, the French military relocated entire villages to centres de regroupements ("regroupement centers"), which were built for forcibly displaced civilian populations, in order to separate them from FLN guerrilla combatants. Over 8,000 villages were destroyed. Over 2 million Algerians were resettled in regrouping internment camps, with some being forced into labour.

A notable instance of rape was that of Djamila Boupacha, a 23-years old Algerian woman who was arrested in 1960, accused of attempting to bomb a cafe in Algiers. Her confession was obtained through torture and rape. Her subsequent trial affected French public opinion about the French army's methods in Algeria after publicity of the case by Simone de Beauvoir and Gisèle Halimi.

Torture was also used by both sides during the First Indochina War (1946–54). Claude Bourdet denounced acts of torture in Algeria on 6 December 1951, in the magazine L'Observateur, rhetorically asking, "Is there a Gestapo in Algeria?". D. Huf, in his seminal work on the subject, argued that the use of torture was one of the major factors in developing French opposition to the war. Huf argued, "Such tactics sat uncomfortably with France's revolutionary history, and brought unbearable comparisons with Nazi Germany. The French national psyche would not tolerate any parallels between their experiences of occupation and their colonial mastery of Algeria." General Paul Aussaresses admitted in 2000 that systematic torture techniques were used during the war and justified them. He also recognized the assassination of lawyer Ali Boumendjel and the head of the FLN in Algiers, Larbi Ben M'Hidi, which had been disguised as suicides. Marcel Bigeard, who called FLN activists "savages", claimed torture was a "necessary evil". To the contrary, General Jacques Massu denounced it, following Aussaresses's revelations and, before his death, pronounced himself in favor of an official condemnation of the use of torture during the war.

Bigeard's justification of torture has been criticized by Joseph Doré, archbishop of Strasbourg, Marc Lienhard, president of the Lutheran Church of Augsbourg Confession in Alsace-Lorraine, and others. In June 2000, Bigeard declared that he was based in Sidi Ferruch, a torture center where Algerians were murdered. Bigeard qualified Louisette Ighilahriz's revelations, published in the Le Monde newspaper on June 20, 2000, as "lies". An ALN activist, Louisette Ighilahriz had been tortured by Massu. However, since Massu's revelations, Bigeard has admitted the use of torture, although he denies having personally used it, and has declared, "You are striking the heart of an 84-year-old man." Bigeard also recognized that Larbi Ben M'Hidi was assassinated and that his death was disguised as a suicide.

In 2018 France officially admitted that torture was systematic and routine.

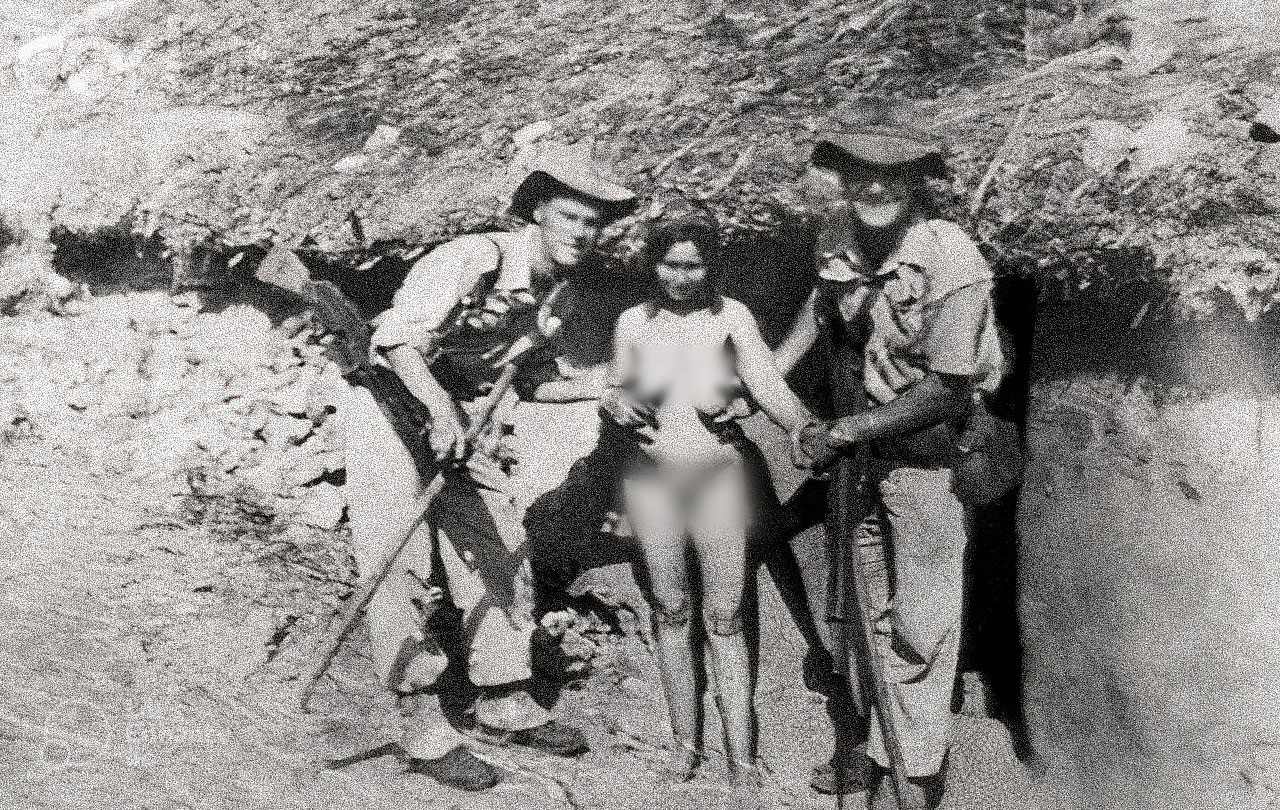
Algerian woman sexually abused by the French Army

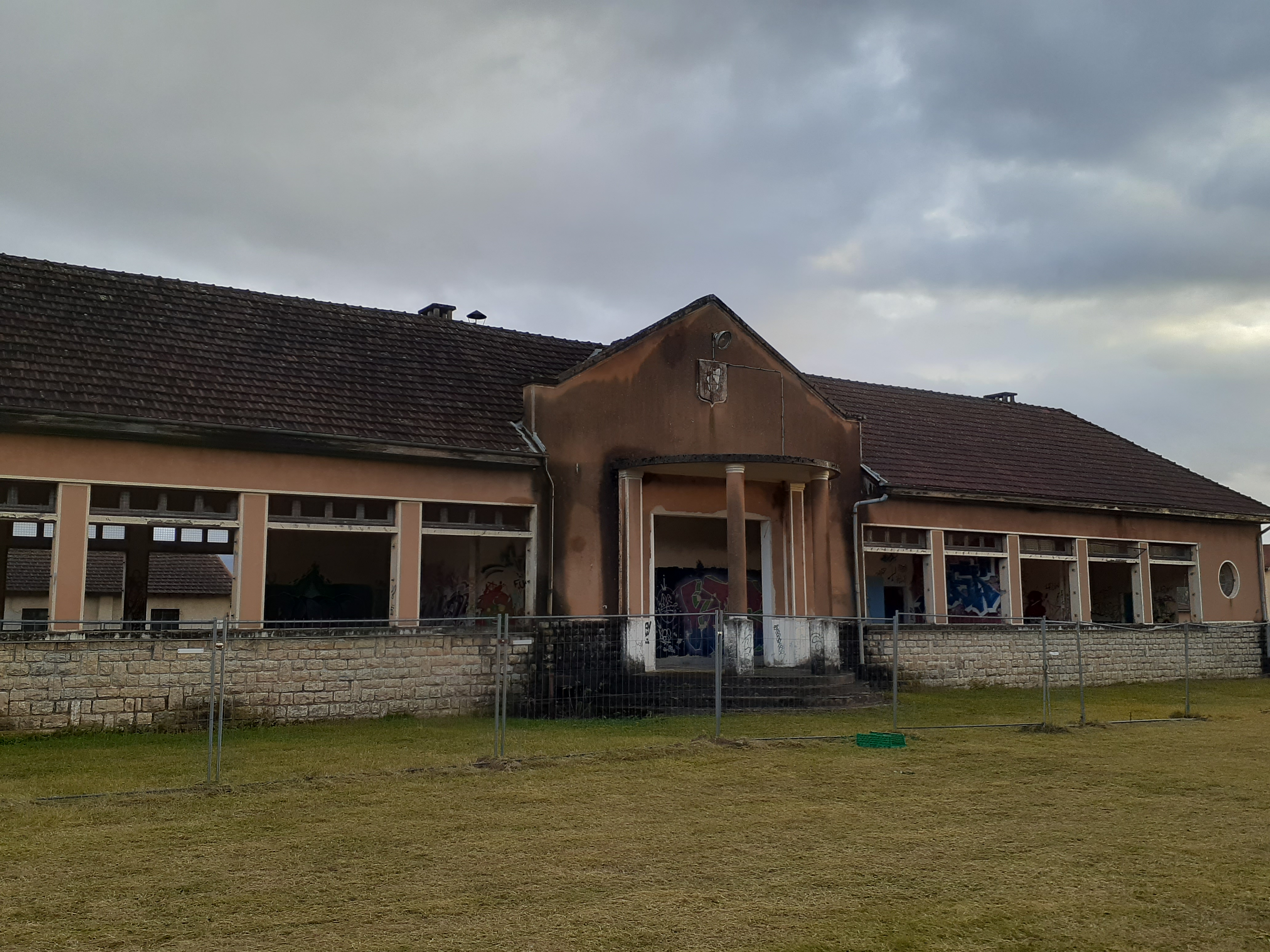
Camp de Thol, one of the French concentration camps for Algerians used during the war

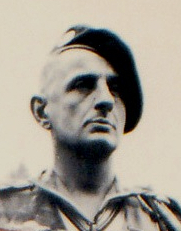
Marcel Bigeard's troops were accused of practicing "death flights", whose victims were called crevettes Bigeard (fr), "Bigeard shrimp".

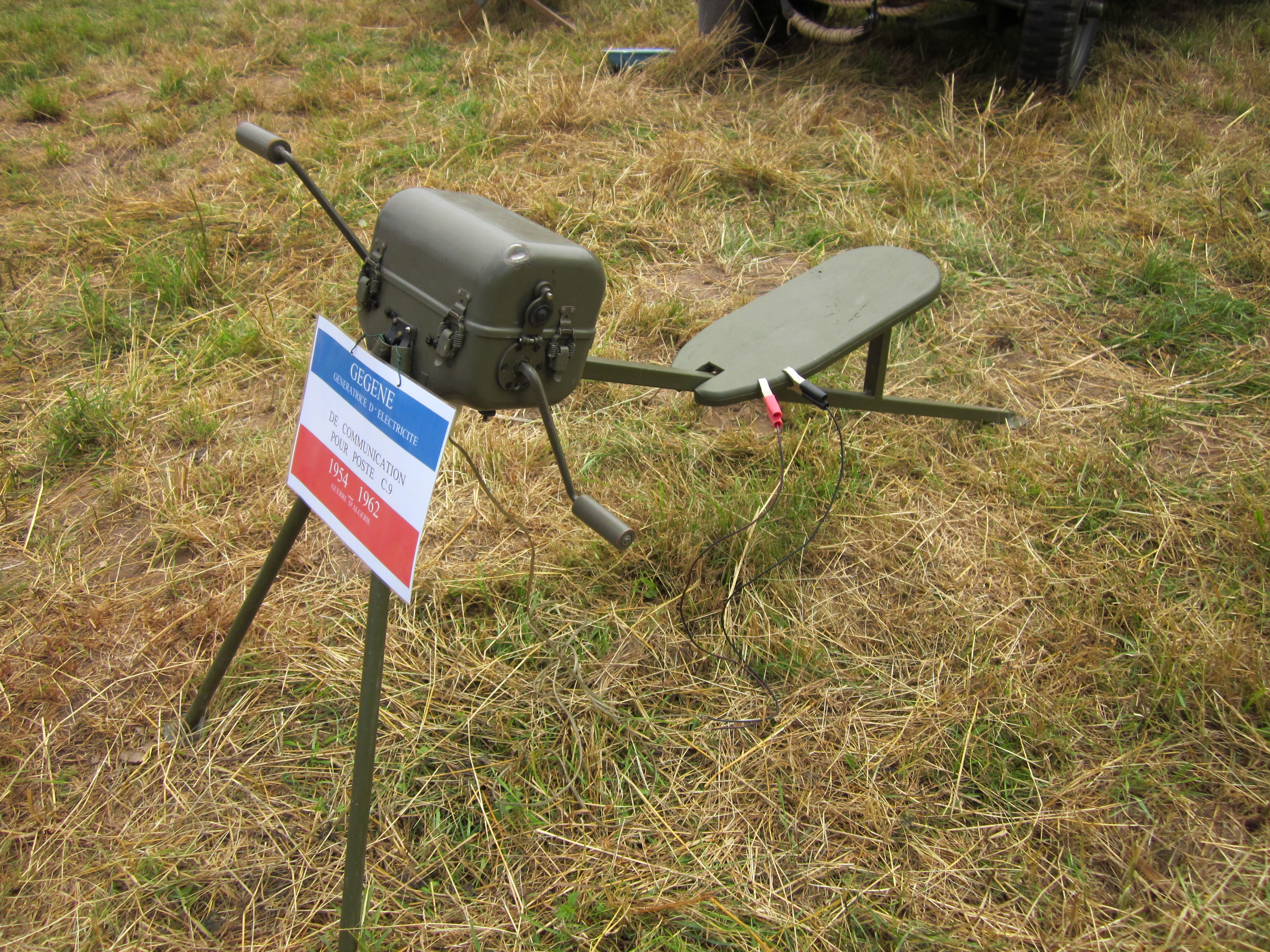
"Gégène", a device used by the French forces to generate electricity; electrodes would then be attached to the victim's body parts for electric torture.

=== Algerian use of terror ===
Specializing in ambushes and night raids to avoid direct contact with superior French firepower, the internal forces targeted army patrols, military encampments, police posts, and colonial farms, mines, and factories, as well as transportation and communications facilities. At first, the FLN targeted only Muslim officials of the colonial regime; later, they coerced, maimed, or killed village elders, government employees, and even simple peasants who refused to support them. Throat slitting and decapitation were commonly used by the FLN as mechanisms of terror. Some other atrocities were committed by the more militant sections of the FLN as collective reprisals against the pieds-noirs population in response to French repression. The more extreme cases occurred in places like the town of Al-Halia, where some European residents were raped and disemboweled, while children had been murdered by slitting their throats or banging their heads against walls.

During the first two and a half years of the conflict, the guerrillas killed an estimated 6,352 Muslim and 1,035 non-Muslim civilians.

== Historiography ==
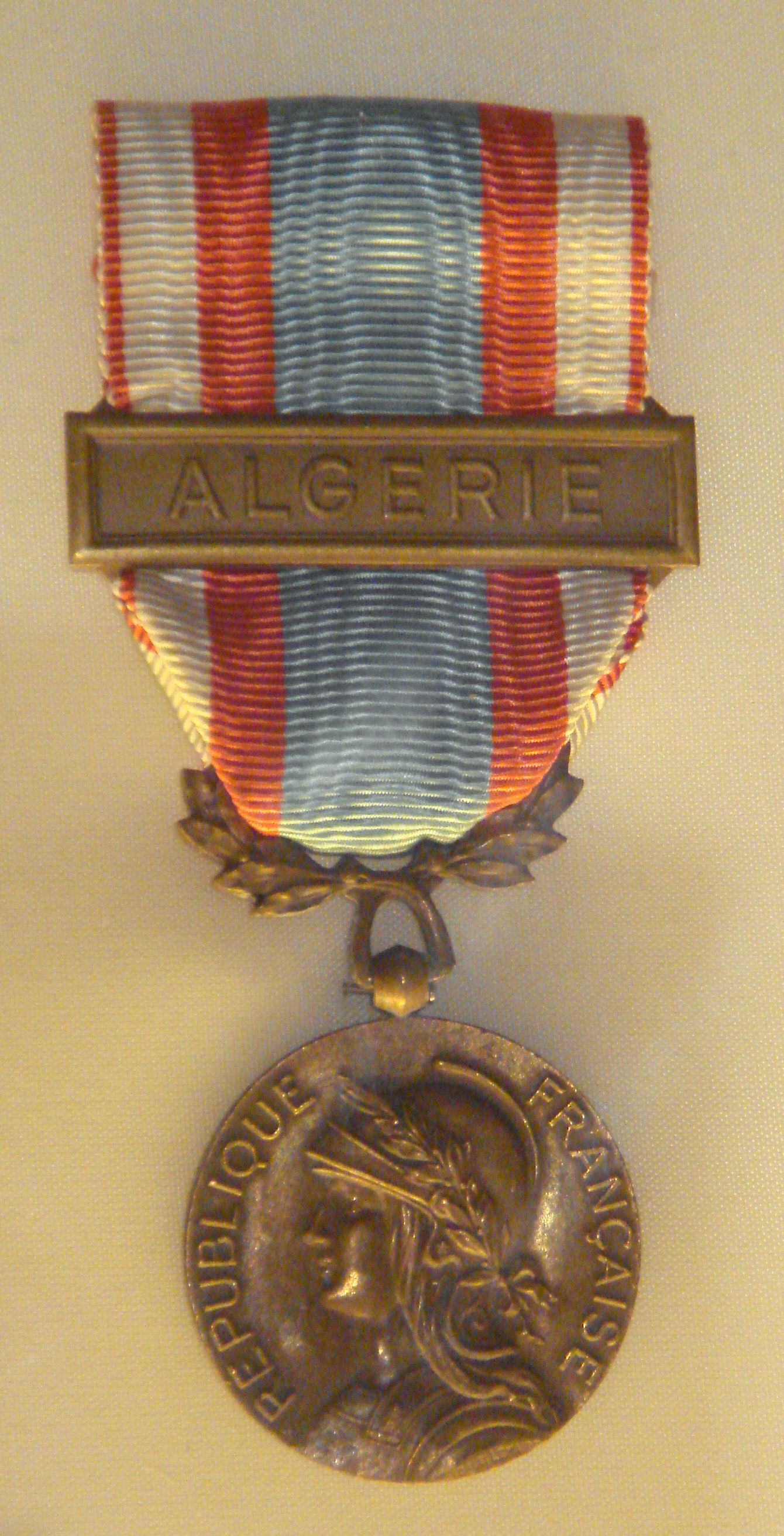
French North African Operations medal, 11 January 1958

Although the opening of the archives of the Ministry of Foreign Affairs after a 30-year lock-up enabled some new historical research on the war, including Jean-Charles Jauffret's book, La Guerre d'Algérie par les documents (The Algerian War According to the Documents), many remain inaccessible. The recognition in 1999 by the National Assembly permitted the Algerian War to enter the syllabi of French schools. In France, the war was known as "la guerre sans nom" ("the war without a name") while it was being fought. The government variously described the war as the "Algerian events", the "Algerian problem" and the "Algerian dispute"; the mission of the French Army was "ensuring security", "maintaining order" and "pacification" but was never described as fighting a war. The FLN were referred to as "criminals", "bandits", "outlaws", "terrorists", and "fellagha" (a derogatory Arabic word meaning "road-cutters" but often mistranslated as "throat-cutters" in reference to the FLN's frequent method of execution, which made people wear the "Kabylian smile" by cutting their throats, pulling their tongues out, and leaving them to bleed to death). After reports of the widespread use of torture by French forces started to reach France in 1956–1957, the war become commonly known as la sale guerre ("the dirty war"), a term that is still used today and reflects the very negative memory of the war in France.

=== Lack of commemoration ===
As the war was officially a "police action", no monuments were built for decades to honour the about 25,000 French soldiers killed in the war, and the Defense Ministry refused to classify veterans as veterans until the 1970s. When a monument to the Unknown Soldier of the Algerian War was erected in 1977, French President Valéry Giscard d'Estaing, in his dedication speech, refused to use the words war or Algeria but instead used the phrase "the unknown soldier of North Africa". A national monument to the French war dead was not built until 1996 and, even then spoke only of those killed fighting in Afrique du nord and was located in a decrepit area of Paris rarely visited by tourists, as if to hide the monument. Further adding to the silence were the vested interests of French politicians. François Mitterrand, the French president 1981 to 1995, had been the Interior Minister from 1954 to 1955 and the Justice Minister from 1955 to 1957, when he had been deeply involved in the repression of the FLN, and it was only after Mitterrand's death in 1996, that his French Socialist Party started to become willing to talk about the war and, even then, remained very guarded about his role. Likewise, de Gaulle had promised in the Évian Agreements that the pieds-noirs could remain in Algeria, but after independence, the FLN freely violated the accords and led to the entire pied-noir population fleeing to France, usually with only the clothes they were wearing, as they had lost everything they had in Algeria, a circumstance further embarrassing the defeated nation.

=== English-language historiography ===
One of the first books about the war in English, A Scattering of Dust by the American journalist Herb Greer in 1962, depicted very favorably the Algerian struggle for independence. Most work in English in the 1960s and 1970s were the work of left-wing scholars, who were focused on explaining the FLN as a part of a generational change in Algerian nationalism and depicted the war as a reaction to intolerable oppression and/or an attempt by the peasants, impoverished by French policies, to improve their lot. One of the few military histories of the war was The Algerian Insurrection, by the retired British Army officer Edgar O'Ballance, who wrote with unabashed admiration for French high command during the war and saw the FLN as a terrorist group. O'Ballance concluded that the tactics which won the war militarily for the French lost the war for them politically.

In 1977, the British journalist Alistair Horne published A Savage War of Peace, regarded by some authors as the leading book written on the subject in English, though written from a French, rather than Algerian perspective. Fifteen years after the end of the war, Horne was accused of not being concerned about "right or wrong" but rather about "cause and effect". Living in Paris at the time of the war, Horne had condemned French intervention during the Suez Crisis and the French bombing of the Tunisian village of Sakiet Sidi Youssef in 1958. He'd argued that the "inflexibility" of the FLN had won Algeria independence, creating a sense of Algerian national identity, and leading the Front to rule over authoritarian but "progressive" FLN regime. In a 1977 review published in The Times Literary Supplement, Iraqi-born British historian Elie Kedourie attacked Horne as an "apologist for terrorism." Kedourie wrote that far from being a mass movement, the FLN were a "small gang" of "murderous intellectuals" who used brutal, terrorist tactics against the French citizens and military, and against any Muslim loyal to the French. Kedourie charged that de Gaulle had cynically sacrificed the colons and the harkis, disregarding his constitutional oath as president to protect all Frenchmen.

In 1992, American historian John Ruedy, the focus of whose research was the history of the Maghreb and French colonialism in Algeria, published Modern Algeria: Origins and Development of a Nation. Ruedy wrote that under French rule the traditional social structure had been so completely destroyed that when the FLN launched its independence struggle in 1954, the only way of asserting one's interests was through "the law of the gun", which explains why the FLN was so violent not only in regards to its enemies but also within the movement. The FLN, thus, according to Ruedy, formed the basis of an "alternative political culture", based on "brute force" that has persisted ever since.

=== In film ===
Before the war, Algeria was a popular setting for French films; the British professor Leslie Hill having written: "In the late 1920s and 1930s, for instance, North Africa provided film-makers in France with a ready fund of familiar images of the exotics, mingling, for instance, the languid eroticism of Arabian nights with the infinite and hazy vistas of the Sahara to create a powerful confection of tragic heroism and passionate love." During the war itself, French censors banned the entire subject of the war. Since 1962, when film censorship relating to the war eased, French films dealing with the conflict have consistently portrayed the war as a set of conflicting memories and rival narratives (which ones being correct are left unclear), with most films dealing with the war taking a disjointed chronological structure in which scenes before, during and after the war are juxtaposed out of sequence with one film critic referring to the cinematic Algeria as "an ambiguous world marked by the displacements and repetitions of dreams". The consistent message of French films dealing with the war is that something horrible happened, but what happened, who was involved and why are left unexplained. Atrocities, especially torture by French forces are acknowledged, the French soldiers who fought in Algeria were and are always portrayed in French cinema as the "lost soldiers" and tragic victims of the war who are more deserving of sympathy than the FLN people they tortured, which are almost invariably portrayed as vicious, psychopathic terrorists, an approach to the war that has raised anger in Algeria.

The Algerian film industry, begun in the years immediately following the war, ventured to accurately document the Algerian people's struggle for independence. The genre of Algerian war films is generally considered to have begun with The Battle of Algiers in 1966, inspiring other filmmakers to document their view of the war. These films commonly depicted the struggle of rural Algerians, who are as a collective put forth as the entire people of Algeria. Care was taken to exclude any prominent revolutionary figures, as well as urban Algerians altogether. The films themselves, especially in the early years, struggled to lay out any coherent explanation as to why the war had occurred in the first place. The films themselves were polarizing, as in their respective attempts to make accurate, cohesive accounts of the war they only made a disjointed collection of their own biased perceptions. Each filmmaker's view of the war varied according to their own experiences, and it became nearly impossible to reconcile these differences into a perfectly accurate representation of what had occurred. In later decades, the setting of the heart of the war gradually disappeared, and fiction became more and more popular. The themes within this fiction continued to be inspired by the war and the years following independence, though, and delved more into metaphor and humor as storytelling devices.

=== Reminders ===
From time to time, the memory of the Algerian War surfaced in France. In 1987, when SS-Hauptsturmführer Klaus Barbie, the "Butcher of Lyon", was brought to trial for crimes against humanity, graffiti appeared on the walls of the banlieues, the slum districts in which most Algerian immigrants in France live, reading: "Barbie in France! When will Massu be in Algeria!". Barbie's lawyer, Jacques Vergès, adopted a tu quoque defence that asked the judges "is a crime against humanity is to be defined as only one of Nazis against the Jews or if it applies to more seriously crimes... the crimes of imperialists against people struggling for their independence?". He went on to say that nothing that his client had done against the French Resistance that was not done by "certain French officers in Algeria" who, Vergès noted, could not be prosecuted because of de Gaulle's amnesty of 1962. In 1997, when Maurice Papon, a career French civil servant was brought to trial for crimes against humanity for sending 1600 Jews from Bordeaux to be killed at Auschwitz in 1942, it emerged over the course of the trial that on 17 October 1961, Papon had organized a massacre of between 100 and 200 Algerians in central Paris, which was the first time that most French had ever heard of the massacre. The revelation that hundreds of people had been killed by the Paris Sûreté was a great shock in France and led to uncomfortable questions being raised about what had happened during the Algerian War. The American historian William Cohen wrote that the Papon trial "sharpened the focus" on the Algerian War but not provide "clarity", as Papon's role as a civil servant under Vichy led to misleading conclusions in France that it was former collaborators who were responsible for the terror in Algeria, but most of the men responsible, like Guy Mollet, General Marcel Bigeard, Robert Lacoste, General Jacques Massu and Jacques Soustelle, had actually all been résistants in World War II, which many French historians found to be very unpalatable.

On 15 June 2000, Le Monde published an interview with Louisette Ighilahriz, a former FLN member who described in graphic detail her torture at the hands of the French Army and made the sensational claim that the war heroes General Jacques Massu and General Marcel Bigeard had personally been present when she was being tortured for information. What made the interview very touching for many French people was that Ighilahriz was not demanding vengeance but wished to express thanks to Dr. François Richaud, the army doctor who extended her much kindness and who, she believed, saved her life by treating her every time she was tortured. She asked if it were possible for her to see Dr. Richaud one last time to thank him personally, but it later turned out that Dr. Richaud had died in 1997. As Ighilahriz had been an attractive woman in her youth, university-educated, secular, fluent in French and fond of quoting Victor Hugo, and her duties in the FLN had been as an information courier, she made for a most sympathetic victim since she was a woman who did not come across as Algerian. William Cohen commented that had she been an uneducated man who had been involved in killings and was not coming forward to express thanks for a Frenchman, her story might not have resonated the same way. The Ighiahriz case led to a public letter signed by 12 people who have been involved in the war to President Jacques Chirac to ask October 31 be made a public day of remembrance for victims of torture in Algeria.

In response to the Ighilahriz case, General Paul Aussaresses gave an interview on 23 November 2000 in which he candidly admitted to ordering torture and extrajudicial executions and stated he had personally executed 24 fellagha. He argued that they were justified, as torture and extrajudicial executions were the only way to defeat the FLN. In May 2001, Aussaresses published his memoirs, Services spéciaux Algérie 1955–1957, in which he presented a detailed account of torture and extrajudicial killings in the name of the republic, which he wrote were all done under orders from Paris; that confirmed what had been long suspected. As a result of the interviews and Aussaresses's book, the Algerian War was finally extensively discussed by the French media, which had ignored the subject as much as possible for decades, but no consensus emerged about how to best remember the war. Adding to the interest was the decision by one war veteran, Georges Fogel, to come forward to confirm that he had seen Ighiahriz and many others tortured in 1957, and the politician and war veteran Jean Marie Faure decided in February 2001 to release extracts from the diary that he had kept and showed "acts of sadism and horror" that he had witnessed. The French historian Pierre Vidal-Naquet called that a moment of "catharsis" that was "explainable only in near-French terms: it is the return of the repressed".

In 2002, Une Vie Debout: Mémoires Politiques by Mohammed Harbi, a former advisor to Ben Bella, was published in which Harbi wrote: "Because they [the FLN leaders] weren't supported at the moment of their arrival on the scene by a real and dynamic popular movement, they took power of the movement by force and they maintained it by force. Convinced that they had to act with resolution in order to protect themselves against their enemies, they deliberately chose an authoritarian path."

=== Continued controversy in France ===
The Algerian War remains a contentious event. According to the historian Benjamin Stora, one of the leading historians on the war, memories concerning the war remain fragmented, with no common ground to speak of:

There is no such thing as a history of the Algerian War; there is just a multitude of histories and personal paths through it. Everyone involved considers that they lived through it in their own way, and any attempt to understand the Algerian War globally is immediately rejected by protagonists.

Even though Stora has counted 3,000 publications in French on the war, there still is no work produced by French and Algerian authors co-operating with each other. Although according to Stora, there can "no longer be talk about a 'war without a name', a number of problems remain, especially the absence of sites in France to commemorate" the war. Furthermore, conflicts have arisen on an exact commemoration date to end the war. Although many sources as well as the French state place it on 19 March 1962, the Évian Agreements, others point out that massacres of harkis and the kidnapping of pieds-noirs took place later. Stora further points out, "The phase of memorial reconciliation between the two sides of the sea is still a long way off." That was evidenced by the National Assembly's creation of the law on colonialism on 23 February 2005 that asserted that colonialism had overall been "positive".

Alongside a heated debate in France, the February 23, 2005, law had the effect of jeopardising the treaty of friendship that President Chirac was supposed to sign with President Abdelaziz Bouteflika, which was no longer on the agenda. Following that controversial law, Bouteflika has talked about a cultural genocide, particularly referring to the 1945 Sétif massacre. Chirac finally had the law repealed by a complex institutional mechanism.

Another matter concerns the teaching of the war as well as of colonialism and decolonization, particularly in French secondary schools. Hence, there is only one reference to racism in a French textbook, one published by Bréal publishers for terminales students, those passing their baccalauréat. Thus, many are not surprised that the first to speak about the 1961 Paris massacre were musical groups, including hip-hop groups such as Suprême NTM (les Arabes dans la Seine) and La Rumeur. Indeed, the Algerian War is not even the subject of a specific chapter in the textbook for terminales. Henceforth, Benjamin Stora stated:

As Algerians do not appear in an "indigenous" condition, and their sub-citizens status, as the history of nationalist movement, is never evoked as their being one of great figures of the resistance, such as Messali Hadj and Ferhat Abbas. They neither emerge nor are being given attention. No one is explaining to students what colonization has been. We have prevented students from understanding why the decolonization took place.

=== Socioeconomic situation of French Algerians ===
In Metropolitan France in 1963, 43% of French Algerians lived in bidonvilles (shanty towns). Thus, Azouz Begag, the delegate Minister for Equal Opportunities, wrote an autobiographic novel, Le Gone du Chaâba, about his experiences while living in a bidonville in the outskirts of Lyon. It is impossible to understand the third-generation of Algerian immigrants to France without recalling the bicultural experience. An official parliamentary report on the "prevention of criminality", commanded by Interior Minister Philippe de Villepin and made by the deputy Jacques-Alain Bénisti, claimed, "Bilingualism (bilinguisme) was a factor of criminality" (sic). Following outcries, the definitive version of the report finally made bilingualism an asset, rather than a fault.

=== French recognition of historical use of torture ===
After having denied or downplayed its use for 40 years, France has finally recognized its history of torture, but there was never an official proclamation about it. General Paul Aussaresses was sentenced following his justification of the use of torture for "apology of war crimes". As they occurred during wartime, France claimed torture to be isolated acts, instead of admitting its responsibility for the frequent use of torture to break the insurgents' morale, not, as Aussaresses had claimed, to "save lives" by gaining short-term information which would stop "terrorists". The state now claims that torture was a regrettable aberration because of the context of the exceptionally-savage war. However, academic research has proved both theses to be false. "Torture in Algeria was engraved in the colonial act; it is a 'normal' illustration of an abnormal system", wrote Nicolas Bancel, Pascal Blanchard and Sandrine Lemaire, who discussed the phenomena of "human zoos". From the enfumades (slaughter by smoke inhalation) of the Darha caves in 1844 by Aimable Pélissier to the 1945 riots in Sétif, Guelma and Kherrata, the repression in Algeria used the same methods. Following the Sétif massacres, other riots against the European presence occurred in Guelma, Batna, Biskra, and Kherrata that resulted in 103 deaths among the pieds-noirs. The suppression of the riots officially saw 1,500 other deaths, but N. Bancel, P. Blanchard and S. Lemaire estimate the number to be between 6,000 and 8,000.

=== INA archives ===
Note: concerning the audio and film archives from the Institut national de l'audiovisuel (INA), see Benjamin Stora's comments on their politically-oriented creation.

- Cinq Colonnes à la une, Rushes Interview Pied-Noir, ORTF, July 1, 1962.
- Cinq Colonnes à la une, Rétrospective Algérie, ORTF, June 9, 1963 (concerning these INA archives, see also Benjamin Stora's warning about the conditions of creation of these images).

=== Contemporary publications ===
- Trinquier, Roger. Modern Warfare: A French View of Counterinsurgency, 1961.
- Leulliette, Pierre, St. Michael and the Dragon: Memoirs of a Paratrooper, Houghton Mifflin, 1964.
- Galula, David, Counterinsurgency Warfare: Theory and Practice, 1964.
- Jouhaud, Edmond. O Mon Pays Perdu: De Bou-Sfer a Tulle. Paris: Librarie Artheme Fayard, 1969.
- Maignen, Etienne Treillis au djebel – Les Piliers de Tiahmaïne Yellow Concept, 2004.
- Derradji, Abder-Rahmane, The Algerian Guerrilla Campaign Strategy & Tactics, The Edwin Mellen Press, New York, 1997.
- Feraoun, Mouloud, Journal 1955–1962, University of Nebraska Press, 2000.
- Pečar, Zdravko, Alžir do nezavisnosti. Beograd: Prosveta; Beograd: Institut za izučavanje radničkog pokreta, 1967.

=== Other publications ===
==== English-language ====
- Aussaresses, General Paul. The Battle of the Casbah, New York: Enigma Books, 2010, ISBN 978-1-929631-30-8.
- Horne, Alistair (1978). A Savage War of Peace: Algeria 1954–1962. Viking. ISBN 978-0-670-61964-1.
- Maran, Rita (1989). Torture: The Role of Ideology in the French-Algerian War, New York: Prager Publishers.
- Windrow, Martin. The Algerian War 1954–62. London: Osprey Publishing, 1997. ISBN 1-85532-658-2.
- Arslan Humbaraci. Algeria: a revolution that failed. London: Pall mall Press Ltd, 1966.
- Samia Henni: Architecture of Counterrevolution. The French Army in Northern Algeria, gta Verlag, Zürich 2017. ISBN 978-3-85676-376-3.

==== French language ====
Translations may be available for some of these works. See specific cases.

- Benot, Yves (1994). Massacres coloniaux, La Découverte, coll. "Textes à l'appui", Paris.
- Jauffret, Jean-Charles. La Guerre d'Algérie par les documents (first tome, 1990; second tome, 1998; account here).
- Rey-Goldzeiguer, Annie (2001). Aux origines de la guerre d'Algérie, La Découverte, Paris.
- Robin, Marie-Monique. Escadrons de la mort, l'école française,453 pages. La Découverte (15 September 2004). Collection: Cahiers libres. (ISBN 2-7071-4163-1) (Spanish transl.: Los Escuadrones De La Muerte/ the Death Squadron), 539 pages. Sudamericana; Édition: Translatio (October 2005) (ISBN 950-07-2684-X).
- Mekhaled, Boucif (1995). Chroniques d'un massacre. 8 mai 1945. Sétif, Guelma, Kherrata, Syros, Paris, 1995.
- Slama, Alain-Gérard (1996). La Guerre d'Algérie. Histoire d'une déchirure, Gallimard, coll. "Découvertes Gallimard" (n° 301), Paris.
- Vidal-Naquet, Pierre. La Torture sous la République (1970) and many others, more recent (see entry).
- Roy, Jules (1960). "La guerre d'Algérie" ("The War in Algeria", 1961, Grove Press).
- Etienne Maignen. Treillis au djebel- Les Piliers de Tiahmaïne Yellow Concept 2004.
- Gilbert Meynier. Histoire intérieure du FLN 1954–1962 Fayard 2004.

== Films ==
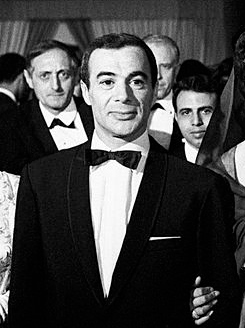
Former FLN member Saadi Yacef starred and co-produced The Battle of Algiers (1966) by Italian filmmaker Gillo Pontecorvo, which was critically acclaimed for its sense of historical authenticity and cast who had lived through the real war.

- Jamila, the Algerian (1958). Egyptian film by Youssef Chahine; about Djamila Bouhired.
- Le Petit Soldat by Jean-Luc Godard (1960). Banned until 1963 because some scenes contained torture. The title translates to "The Little Soldier".
- Octobre à Paris by Jacques Panijel (1961). The title translates to "October in Paris".
- Muriel (film) by Alain Resnais (1962). "Muriel" is a character's name.
- Commando (1962 film)
- Lost Command by Mark Robson (film director) (1966). The French title, Les Centurions, translates to "The Centurions".
- The Battle of Algiers by Gillo Pontecorvo (1966). It was banned in France for five years.
- The Winds of the Aures by Mohammed Lakhdar-Hamina (1967).
- Elise ou la vraie vie by Michel Drach (1970).
- Avoir 20 ans dans les Aurès by René Vautier (1972).
- La Guerre d'Algérie, a documentary film by Yves Courrière (1972). The title translates to "The Algerian War".
- R.A.S by Yves Boisset (1973)
- Wild Reeds by André Téchiné (1994)
- "Deserter" by Martin Huberty (2002)
- La Trahison by Philippe Faucon (2005). Adapted from a novel by Claude Sales on the presence of Muslim soldiers in the French Army. The title translates to, "The Treason".
- Nuit noire by Alain Tasma (2005). On the 1961 Paris massacre. The title translates to "Black Night".
- Caché by Michael Haneke (2005). On the 1961 Paris massacre. The movie is often known in English by its French name's translation, "Hidden".
- Harkis by Alain Tasma (2006). The title refers to ethnically Algerian French military auxiliaries.
- Mon colonel by Laurent Herbier (2007). The title translates to "My Colonel".
- L'Ennemi Intime by Florent Emilio Siri (2007). Scenario by Patrick Rotman which depicts the use of Napalm.
- Cartouches Gauloises by Mehdi Charef (2007)
- Balcon sur la mer by Nicole Garcia (2010). About the adult lives of two children who survive the siege of Oran. The title translates to, "Balcony on the Ocean".
- Outside the Law by Rachid Bouchareb (2010)
- La Valise ou le Cercueil (2011). French documentary film.
- Ce que le jour doit à la nuit by Alexandre Arcady (2012)
- Far from Men by David Oelhoffen (2014). Based on the short story The Guest, by Albert Camus.

== See also ==
- Proposed partition of Algeria
- Adolfo Kaminsky, forger who worked for the FLN to make false IDs
- Cameroon War
- France and weapons of mass destruction
- History of the Armée de l'Air in the colonies (1939–1962)
- Independence Day (Algeria)
- Manifesto of the 121
- Mokrani Revolt
- List of French governors of Algeria
- Year of Africa

== Sources ==
- Library of Congress Country Study of Algeria
