= 1962 Algerian independence referendum =

Referendum approving independence of French Algeria

- 1 July 1962
- Do you want Algeria to become an independent state, co-operating with France under the conditions defined in the declarations of 19 March 1962?
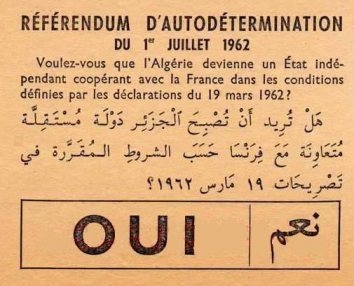
- A "YES" ballot from the Algerian independence referendum

Results
Choice	Votes	%
For	5,975,581	99.72%
Against	16,534	0.28%
Valid votes	5,992,115	99.58%
Invalid or blank votes	25,565	0.42%
Total votes	6,017,680	100.00%
Registered voters/turnout	6,549,736	91.88%

An independence referendum was held in French Algeria on 1 July 1962. It followed French approval of the Évian Accords in an April referendum. Voters were asked whether Algeria should become an independent state, co-operating with France; 99.72% voted in favour with a voter turnout of 91.88%.

Following the referendum, France declared Algeria to be independent on 3 July; the decision was published in the official journal the following day, and Algerian leaders declared 5 July (the 132nd anniversary of the French arrival in Algiers) to be Independence Day. When Algeria ceased to be part of France it also ceased being part of the European Communities.

== Background ==
The Algerian War was started by members of the National Liberation Front (FLN) with the Toussaint Rouge attacks on 1 November 1954. Conflicts proliferated in France, including the May 1958 Algerian crisis that led to the fall of the Fourth Republic. French forces used brutal means of attempting to suppress Algerian nationalists, alienating support in metropolitan France and discrediting French prestige abroad.

In 1960, French President Charles de Gaulle agreed to negotiations with the FLN after major demonstrations in Algiers and other cities. A 1961 referendum on allowing self-determination for Algeria was approved by 75% of voters (including 70% of those voting in Algeria). Negotiations concluded with the signing of the Évian Accords in March 1962, which were approved by 91% of voters in a referendum on 8 April.

== Results ==
The referendum question was phrased:

Voulez vous que l'Algérie devienne un État indépendant coopérant avec la France dans les conditions définies par les déclarations du 19 mars 1962 ?

In English: "Do you want Algeria to become an independent state, co-operating with France under the conditions defined in the declarations of 19 March 1962?"

Choice	Votes	%
For	5,975,581	99.72
Against	16,534	0.28
Total	5,992,115	100.00
Valid votes	5,992,115	99.58
Invalid/blank votes	25,565	0.42
Total votes	6,017,680	100.00
Registered voters/turnout	6,549,736	91.88
Source: Direct Democracy

== Aftermath ==
In accordance with the Évian accords (Chapter III.3) France was allowed to maintain its Mers El Kébir naval base for fifteen years. However, all forces were withdrawn in 1967.

Canadian historian John C. Cairns stated in 1962 that:

"In some ways the last year was the worst. Tension had never been higher. Disenchantment in France at least had never been greater. The mindless cruelty of it all had never been more absurd and savage. This last year, stretching from the hopeful spring of 1961 to the cease-fire of March 18, 1962, spanned a season of revolt, shadow-boxing, false threats, capitulation and murderous hysteria. French Algeria died badly. Its agony was marked by panic and brutality as ugly as the record of European imperialism could show. In the spring of 1962 the unhappy corpse of empire still shuddered and lashed out and stained itself in fratricide. The whole episode of its death, measured over at least seven and a half years, constituted perhaps the most pathetic and sordid event in the long twilight of colonialism. It was hard to see that anyone of importance in the tangled conflict came out of it well. Nobody won the conflict, nobody dominated it. It had raged on almost uncontrolled, destroying men and institutions and principles of conduct. No one could win. It was simply agreed between the two principal parties to the struggle that the war should end. The myth of Algeria as an integral part of France collapsed. The myth of an Algerian nation was left in the ruins of empire to be made concrete."
