= 1962 French Évian Accords referendum =

| 8 April 1962 |
- Do you approve of the bill submitted to the French people by the President of the Republic and concerning the agreements to be established and the measures to be taken with regard to Algeria on the basis of the government declarations of 19 March 1962?

Results
| Choice | Votes | % |
|---|---|---|
| Yes | 17,866,423 | 90.81% |
| No | 1,809,074 | 9.19% |
| Valid votes | 19,675,497 | 94.69% |
| Invalid or blank votes | 1,103,806 | 5.31% |
| Total votes | 20,779,303 | 100.00% |
| Registered voters/turnout | 27,582,072 | 75.34% |

A referendum to approve the Évian Accords ending the Algerian War and granting self-determination to Algeria was held in France on 8 April 1962. It was approved by 90.8% of voters with a 75.3% turnout.

On 1 July a second referendum was held in Algeria, with the question "Do you want Algeria to become an independent state cooperating with France under the conditions defined by the 19 March 1962 declarations?" put to voters. Only people living in Algeria were able to participate in the second referendum. This second referendum was approved by over 99.7% of voters.

== Results ==
| Choice | Metropolitan France | | Total | |
| Choice | Votes | % | Votes | % |
|---|---|---|---|---|
| For | 17,508,607 | 90.7 | 17,866,423 | 90.8 |
| Against | 1,795,061 | 9.3 | 1,809,074 | 9.2 |
| Invalid/blank votes | 1,098,238 | – | 1,103,806 | – |
| Total | 20,401,906 | 100 | 20,779,303 | 100 |
Source: Nohlen & Stöver
