= La Valise ou le Cercueil =

2011 French documentary film

La Valise ou le Cercueil (transl. The Suitcase or the Coffin) is a 2011 French documentary about the pieds-noirs who fled from French Algeria to mainland France after the Évian Accords at the end of the Algerian War. It was directed by Charly Cassan, who was awarded a knighthood in the Order of Academic Palms for the film.

The title is a direct reference to the slogan, the suitcase or the coffin, by the Algerian People's Party, seen on leaflets distributed to mailboxes in Constantine as early as 1946. "La valise ou le cercueil" was subsequently taken up by certain Algerian nationalists against the pied-noirs population during the Algerian War.
