= Political will =

Political will is defined as "the extent of committed support among key decision makers for a particular policy solution to a particular problem." It is also considered by political scientist Linn Hammergren to be "the slipperiest concept in the policy lexicon." Lack of political will is often blamed for unresolved political issues. The term is also used in public health discourse to denote a community's willingness and commitment to support or modify existing policies and programs or to develop new ones, based on public understanding and support, to enable the mobilization of resources necessary for their implementation.
