= Toussaint Rouge =

Series of attacks that marked the beginning of the Algerian War

Red All-Saints' Day Toussaint Rouge
- Part of Algerian War
- Location: French Algeria
- Date: 1 November 1954; 00:00 – 02:00
- Attack type: Bomb attacks and sabotages
- Deaths: 10
- Perpetrator: FLN

Toussaint Rouge (French: [tusɛ̃ ʁuʒ], "Red All Saints' Day"), also known as Toussaint Sanglante (French: [tusɛ̃ sɑ̃glɑ̃t], "Bloody All-Saints' Day"), was a series of 70 attacks committed by militant members of the Algerian National Liberation Front (FLN) that took place on 1 November 1954—the Catholic festival of All Saints' Day—in French Algeria. It is usually taken as the starting date for the Algerian War which lasted until 1962 and led to Algerian independence from France.

== Background ==
The National Liberation Front was started in June 1954. Members of the CRUA (Revolutionary Committee of Unity and Action) and former members of the Special Organization (OS), the paramilitary branch of Messali Hadj's MTLD (Movement for the Triumph of Democratic Liberties), decided to join together and move to armed struggle.

== Attacks ==
Between midnight and 2 am on the morning of All Saints' Day, 70 individual attacks were made by FLN militants against police, military and civilian pied-noir targets around French Algeria. Ten people were killed in the coordinated attacks.

== Reaction in Paris ==
After hearing of the attacks, François Mitterrand, then Minister of the Interior, dispatched two companies (600 men) of the Compagnies Républicaines de Sécurité (CRS) to Algeria. A total of three companies of paratroopers also arrived between 1 and 2 November.

On 12 November 1954, Pierre Mendès France, President of the French Council of Ministers declared that the attacks would not be tolerated in a speech to the National Assembly:

One does not compromise when it comes to defending the internal peace of the nation, the unity and integrity of the Republic. The Algerian departments are part of the French Republic. They have been French for a long time, and they are irrevocably French.... Between them and metropolitan France there can be no conceivable secession.

The Mendes France government increased the number of soldiers in Algeria from 56,000 to 83,000 men to deal with the situation in the Aures mountains — the "main bastion of the insurrection," though the sending of the conscripts to Algeria did not occur until one year later after the Journée des tomates (lit: "Day of Tomatoes") on 6 February 1956 under the Guy Mollet government.

== Public reaction ==
The political reaction notwithstanding, the Toussaint Rouge attacks did not receive much coverage in the French media. The French daily newspaper Le Monde ran a single short column on the front page, and L'Express gave it just two columns.
