= Mohamed Aïchaoui =

Algerian journalist (1921–1959)

- Muḥend Aɛicawi
- Born: 29 January 1921; Si Mustapha, Boumerdès Province, Algeria
- Died: 1959 (aged 37–38); Zbarbar, Bouira Province, Algeria
- Occupations: Journalist, military
- Writing career
- Language: Arabic, Berber, French
- Notable work: Declaration of 1 November 1954

Mohamed Aïchaoui (Kabyle: Muḥend Aɛicawi; 29 January 1921 – 1959) was an Algerian journalist and militant in the nationalist movement against French Algeria. Aïchaoui wrote the Declaration of 1 November 1954, the National Liberation Front's first appeal to the Algerian people at the start of the Algerian War. After earlier imprisonment and torture, he died in a 1959 clash with the French army.

== Early life ==
Aïchaoui was born on 29 January 1921, in the town of Si Mustapha, in lower Kabylia, near the Isser River. He grew up in woody Thénia, part of the Khachna mountain range. Aïchaoui's father worked for a French settler and, after his death, his wife moved to Algiers with her children. They settled in El Annasser, renting a house on the former Rue Ampère. His family's poverty forced Aïchaoui to leave school and work with his older brother, Saïd, as a carpenter. He later worked for a French lawyer, where he learned administration and fingerprinting.

== Algerian nationalism ==
Inspired by Saïd's underground activism in the Algerian People's Party (PPA), Aïchaoui became interested in Algerian independence. He joined the party, and participated in the 1 May 1945 demonstrations in Algiers' Belcourt (Belouizdad) neighbourhood. He led marchers through the Bab Djedid district, on rue Larbi Ben M'hidi, to the Grande Poste d'Alger.

Aïchaoui was a political orator during World War II after evading compulsory military service in France, citing illness. His activism inspired resistance by young people from working-class neighbourhoods, laying the groundwork for an uprising against the colonial regime. Aïchaoui pled the nationalist cause with young athletes returning from training, discussing their favorite sport and moving on to colonial Algeria, its history, and its need for independence.

== Journalism ==
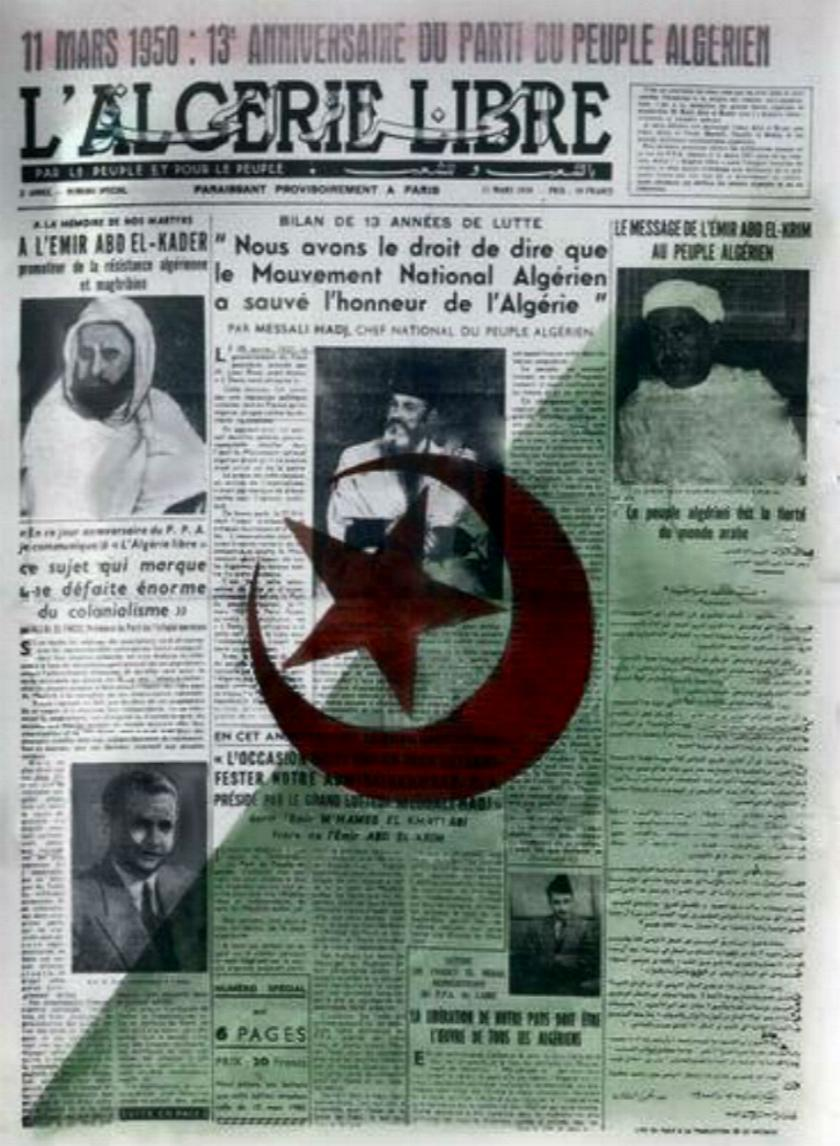
L'Algérie Libre, 11 March 1950

Aïchaoui's interest in literature and journalism stemmed from a desire to appeal to the Algerian elite, driving him to improve his language and writing. His enthusiasm for reading elevated him to the PPA leadership in 1946, where he translated articles into French for the underground newspaper L'Algérie Libre (Arabic: الجزائر الحرة) which were then broadcast in Arabic.

Aïchaoui wrote about party activities and transcribed press releases for its leadership, realizing his aptitude for writing. The PPA first published his writing in the summer 1949 party journal. Aïchaoui then asked the party leadership for permission to study at the French Press Institute in Paris.

== Special Organisation ==
Aïchaoui met Algerian political leader Mohamed Boudiaf and nationalist activist Mourad Didouche when he was a journalism intern in France in 1950, and they recruited him into the Special Organisation. He studied journalism abroad for two years, working in the field before his return to Algiers in 1953. Aïchaoui received his press credentials when he returned to Algeria, which allowed him to work professionally. As a successful journalist, he no longer needed to do clerical work. Aïchaoui's militancy allied him with the Messalists, who split from the centrists in early 1954.

== Declaration of 1 November 1954 ==
After the Revolutionary Committee of Unity and Action (CRUA) decided to take armed action, the task of drafting the independence proclamation was entrusted to Aïchaoui in the Casbah of Algiers. The 1954 outbreak of the revolution prompted a group of six people to prepare the final version of the revolutionary declaration after its broad outlines were agreed at a 10 October 1954 meeting in El Mouradia. When CRUA asked Aïchaoui to write the declaration, the messalists attempted to physically intimidate him in Belcourt (Belouizdad).

After he wrote and revised the proclamation, he typed and mimeographed it in the village of Ighil Imoula under the direction of Rabah Bitat. Bitat introduced Aïchaoui to his friend, Amar Ouamrane, who accompanied him from a Belcourt café to Tizi Ouzou; activist Ali Zamoum then brought him to the targeted village. Zamoum provided Aïchaoui with the wherewithal for his secret mission (often carried out at night), and the journalist returned to Algiers by the same route to be ready for large-scale distribution of the leaflets on the evening of 1 November 1954.

== Torture and imprisonment ==
When he returned from Tizi Ouzou, Aïchaoui was arrested by French soldiers just after the outbreak of the revolution. He distributed leaflets on 2 November (before his arrest) to his acquaintances, including Pierre Chaulet, explaining the seriousness of the revolution. The colonial French police, led by its commissioner, arrived at dawn on 16 November and knocked on the door of Aïchaoui's house. The police ransacked the house without finding incriminating evidence and brought him to the Villa Mahieddine (near the Hacène Harcha Arena), where he was tortured. On the evening of 17 November, 45 minutes of water torture were followed by an interrogation session in Villa Mahieddine. Aïchaoui was forced to swallow dirty water during a one-hour session the following day. A third session used electricity by an inspector who comparing himself to the Gestapo. During a subsequent interrogation, Aïchaoui's ear began to bleed.

Aïchaoui was tortured in Algiers until his 21 November transfer to Tizi Ouzou prison on an 18-month sentence. He was arrested by the French occupation forces with all the people known to belong to the Algerian national movement, and wrote to the judicial authorities and public prosecutor protesting their methods of interrogation and torture.

After Aïchaoui's transfer to Tizi Ouzou, he underwent a three-day interrogation before being presented to the examining magistrate on 24 November. André Mandouze told his family that he was at Villa Mahieddine and then transferred to Tizi Ouzou prison. Aïchaoui served his sentence in the Serkadji and Berrouaghia prisons, and was released in 1956.

== National Liberation Army ==
When Aïchaoui was released from prison, he joined the National Liberation Army (ALN) in the mountainous Wilaya IV and was promoted to lieutenant in its information service. A native of the region, which included Bouzegza Keddara, Zbarbar, and Tablat, he inspired confidence in the mountain population who supported the revolution. Aïchaoui published Guerilla (a newsletter for the region's resistance fighters), and helped investigate the destruction of the village of Djerrah by French aircraft.

== Death ==
Aïchaoui was killed in a 1959 clash with the French army in the Khachna mountains, between Ammal and Lakhdaria. He and his group of resistance fighters took refuge in a cave, and the French killed them in a gas attack.

== Honours ==
In June 2012, eight promotions from the El Harrach Higher School of Equipment were named after Aïchaoui, aged 37 or 38. A public square in Kouba was named for him in 1967, and a middle school in his hometown of Si Mustapha was named for him in 2003. An annual Algerian journalism prize in Aïchaoui's name was established on 4 May 2011.

== See also ==
- List of Algerians
- List of Algerian writers
- Mourad Didouche
- Rabah Bitat
- Abane Ramdane

== Bibliography ==
- La Guerre d'Algérie par les documents: 10 mars 1946 – 31 décembre 1954. Paris: Service historique de l'Armée de terre. 1990. p. 442;530;1005. ISBN 9782863231135.
- Guerres mondiales et conflits contemporains, Numéros 205 à 208. Paris: Presses universitaires de France. 2002. p. 73.
- Saadi Yacef (2002). La bataille d'Alger, Volume 1. Paris: Publisud. p. 82. ISBN 9782866009458.
- Yahia Bouaziz (2004). الثورة في الولاية الثالثة التاريخية: أول نوفمبر 1954 - 19 مارس 1962. Algiers: Éditions El Oumma. p. 43;280;290. ISBN 9789961671757.
- Mohamed Abbas (2004). مثقفون في ركاب الثورة. Algiers: Éditions Houma. p. 132:250;251. ISBN 9789961667828.
- Abdelkrim Chawki (2004). دور العقيد عميروش في الثورة الجزائرية، 1954. Algiers: Éditions Houma. p. 75. ISBN 9789961667477.
- Bilḥusayn Mabrūk (2004). المراسلات الثورة الجزائرية: بين الجزائر والقاهرة. Algiers: Casbah Éditions. p. 87.
- Mohamed Abbas (2005). ثوار عظماء. Algiers: Éditions Houma. p. 100;185. ISBN 9789961667286.
- Maurice Faivre (2006). Le renseignement dans la guerre d'Algérie. Panazol: Lavauzelle. p. 83. ISBN 9782702513149.
