= Ahmed Mahsas =

Algerian militant and sociologist

Ahmed (Ali) Mahsas
- أحمد (علي) محساس
- Born: Ali Mahsas; 17 November 1923; Boudouaou, Boumerdès Province, Algeria
- Died: 24 February 2013 (aged 89); Djasr Kasentina, Algiers Province, Algeria
- Education: École pratique des hautes études; Sorbonne University
- Occupations: Politician, academic
- Writing career
- Pen name: Si Ali Mahsas
- Language: Arabic, Berber, French
- Notable work: Special Organisation (Algeria)
- Movements: Algerian People's Party; Movement for the Triumph of Democratic Liberties

Ahmed Mahsas (Arabic: أحمد (علي) محساس; 17 November 1923 – 24 February 2013) was an Algerian Fighter in the nationalist movement against French Algeria.

== Early life ==
Ahmed Mahsas was born on 17 November 1923 in Boudouaou, Kabylia (now Boumerdès). He grew up in the wooded and mountainous region of the Col des Beni Aïcha.

His family is from the village of Mahsas near Tidjelabine and the Zawiyet Sidi Boumerdassi. His parents settled in Boudouaou at the start of the 20th century.

== Algerian nationalism ==
Mahsas was an early independence activist, and joined the Algerian People's Party (PPA) in Boudouaou in 1940 when he was 16.

He was arrested by French authorities for the first time in 1941 with Mohamed Belouizdad for his actions within the PPA in the Belcourt (Belouizdad) district of Algiers.

He became a militant in Algiers within organizations related to the PPA, such as the Central Youth Committee of Grand Paris (French: Comité central jeune du grand Paris) (CCJGA) and the Youth Committee of Belcourt (French: Comité de la jeunesse de Belcourt) (CJB).

Mahsas was imprisoned several times for his militant activities and had important responsibilities within the PPA where he was a member of the Central Committee and the Organizing Committee. He also participated in organizational work at the territorial and national levels.

Mahsas was drafted during World War II to serve under France in 1944 and 1945, but he refused to join the colonial French army. As a result, he was arrested in 1949 and sentenced by the court.

He was appointed as the head of wilaya (administration district) Constantine and member of the organizing committee of the PPA.

== Special Organisation ==
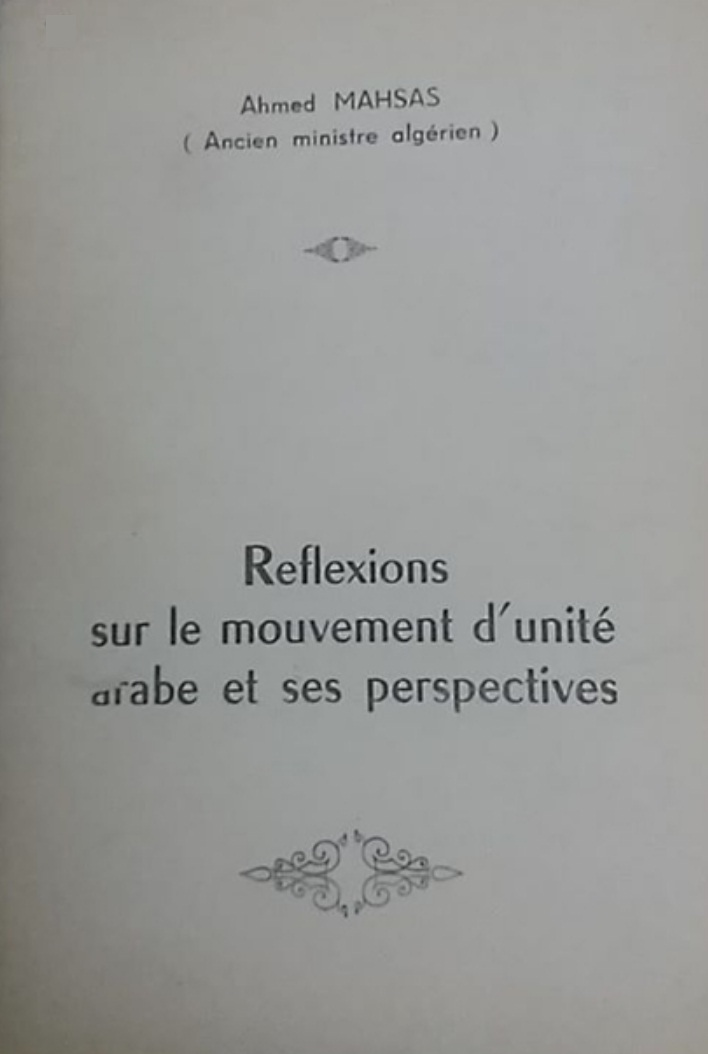
Book of Ahmed Mahsas (1974)

In 1947, Mahsas was one of the founders of the Special Organization (OS) of which he was a national staff member with Belouizdad. When OS was dismantled by the French police in 1950, he was second-in-command.

Mahsas was arrested in 1950 when OS was dismantled, and was held in a prison in Blida along with other nationalist activists of the Movement for the Triumph of Democratic Liberties (MTLD). From 19 March to 27 May 1950, most of the networks of OS in Constantinois, Algérois, and Orania were dismantled with more than 500 arrests, or half the number of militants.

Five out of seven members of the staff were imprisoned: Ahmed Ben Bella, Djillali Belhadj, Djillali Reguimi, M'hamed Yousfi, Ahmed Mahsas, Driss Driss, while others, including Mohamed Maroc, Lakhdar Ben Tobbal, Mohamed Boudiaf, and Mourad Didouche, escaped.

Mahsas escaped with Ahmed Ben Bella from an Algiers prison in 1952.

He then left Algeria for France, where he joined members of the Revolutionary Committee of Unity and Action to prepare for the Algerian Revolution.

During the crisis that arose in the MTLD after the April 1953 congress, Mahsas refused to choose between Messali Hadj and the centralists.

== Algerian Revolution ==
As soon as the Algerian Revolution began after the publication of the Declaration of 1 November 1954, Mahsas joined the National Liberation Front (FLN).

When the FLN Federation of France was created in December 1954, Mahsas was part of the first circle which worked to root the militancy of the FLN, which competed with the Messalists to gain the support of Algerian emigrants.

Mahsas joined the city of Cairo in 1955 in order to join the FLN external delegation and become a member of the National Council of the Algerian Revolution in 1956 and 1957.

Mahsas, like Ben Bella, denounced the results of the Soummam conference, and in December 1956 and early 1957 tried to bring dissident elements from the border regions with Tunisia together.

After Ben Bella was arrested in 1956, Mohamed Boudiaf, Hocine Aït Ahmed, Mohamed Khider, and Mostefa Lacheraf started a power dispute between supporters of Ben Bella and those of Abane Ramdane.

After a disagreement started between him and the other revolutionary leaders, Mahsas was ousted from the FLN base in Tripoli. He was then sentenced to death by Amar Ouamrane and imprisoned in a Tunisian prison. He escaped with some help, left for Germany, and remained there until Algerian independence in 1962.

After Mahsas had taken refuge in Germany, Ouamrane, who was in Tripoli, asked M'hamed Issiakhem to kill Mahsas in Bonn. Bachir El Kadi gave 1,000 dollars to Issiakhem to go to Bonn. Issiakhem found Mahsas and informed him about Ouamrane's plan before giving him 500 dollars and a recommendation to leave Germany.

== Career ==
After Algeria became independent in 1962, Mahsas held several positions, including director of the home ownership and rural exploitation fund (French: Caisse d’accession à la propriété et à l’exploitation rurale), and director of the National Office for Agrarian Reform (French: Office national de la réforme agraire).

He was appointed on 18 September 1963 as Minister of Agriculture in Ben Bella's government, a post that he kept during the government reshuffle of 2 December 1964.

He was elected to the People's National Assembly as deputy for the Algiers Province on 20 September 1964, and was then elected member of the political bureau and of the central committee of the FLN.

The day after Houari Boumédiène organized the 1965 Algerian coup d'état on 19 June against the power of Ben Bella, Mahsas rallied the Revolutionary Council (French: Conseil de la révolution) and was thus maintained in his post of Minister of Agriculture and Agrarian Reform in the new government formed on 10 July.

Mahsas then was appointed member of the Revolutionary Council resulting from this coup, which led to Ben Bella's incarceration for 14 years. But after a little more than a year of service under tutelage of the Revolutionary Council, a conflict arose between Mahsas and Boumédiène, which prompted the former to submit his resignation to be replaced on 24 September 1966 by the lawyer Ali Yahia Abdennour.

== Doctoral studies ==
After settling in France in September 1966, Mahsas resumed his university studies in Paris.

In 1974 Mahsas defended a thesis to obtain a graduation diploma at the École pratique des hautes études (EPHE), the theme of which was Notations on the establishment of agricultural self-management in Algeria (1962-1964) (French: Notations sur la mise en place de l'autogestion agricole en Algérie (1962-1964)).

He obtained a degree in sociology, and in 1978 defended his thesis "The revolutionary movement in Algeria from World War I to 1954" (French: Le mouvement révolutionnaire en Algérie de la Première Guerre mondiale à 1954) under the direction of Jacques Berque.

He published his thesis the same year at L'Harmattan, where he explained the theory of the Algerian Revolution and its achievements on the historical level, and described the context surrounding creation of the PPA and the OS.

== Political opposition ==
In his Parisian exile with Bachir Boumaza (1927-2009), Mahsas tried to collaborate in an action against Boumédiène power by joining the Clandestine Organization of the Algerian Revolution (French: Organisation clandestine de la révolution algérienne) (OCRA). the organization was created in April 1966 headed by Mohammed Lebjaoui, a former leader of the Federation of France (French: Fédération de France du FLN).

Mahsas quickly withdrew from OCRA because he saw leaders like Aït Ahmed and Boudiaf who had distanced themselves from it.

As a doctor in sociology, Mahsas returned in 1978 to the political struggle a year before Boumédiène's death, and he with Ahmed and Tahar Zbiri, created an opposition structure in Paris called the National Rally for Democracy and Revolution (French: Rassemblement national pour la démocratie et la révolution), which dissolved with the end of the old regime.

== Return to Algeria ==
Mahsas returned to Algiers in 1981, a day after Boumédiène's death. He was then appointed by the government of the new president, Chadli Bendjedid, as Advisor to the National Publishing and Distribution Company (French: Société nationale d’édition et de diffusion) (SNED).

With the establishment of a democratic multiparty system in Algeria the day after the 1988 October Riots, Mahsas created a political party called the Union of Democratic Forces (French: Union des forces démocratiques) (UFD). The UFD was of Algerian nationalism obedience with an Arab-Muslim orientation according to the precepts of the Declaration of 1 November 1954. The UFD was deactivated per the law on political parties adopted by the National Transitional Council (French: Conseil national de transition) (CNT) in 1996.

Mahsas tried to reactivate the UFD in 2006, but failed.

== Death ==
Mahsas died on 24 February 2013 in the Aïn Naâdja military hospital located in Djasr Kasentina at age 90. He was to have been honored at the Moufdi Zakaria Palace of Culture as a former nationalist activist and previous minister of agriculture, but was evacuated and transferred to the military hospital in Algiers after suffering from a health problem on the sidelines of the ceremony of honor. He was kept in the hospital's intensive care unit, and scans and tests revealed that he was bleeding internally. He was buried the next day in the El Alia Cemetery.

== Books ==
Mahsas had written several books during a long political and academic career, including:

- Réflexions sur le mouvement d'unité arabe et ses perspectives (1974)
- L'autogestion en Algérie: données politiques de ses premières étapes et de son application (1975)
- L'Algérie: la démocratie et la révolution (1978)
- Le mouvement révolutionnaire en Algérie, de la Première Guerre mondiale à 1954: Essai sur la formation du mouvement national (1979, 1990)
- Algérie, réalités coloniales et résistances: origines culturelles et socio-économiques de la révolution (2006)

== See also ==
- Algerian nationalism
- Algerian War
- List of Algerians
- List of Algerian writers
- El Alia Cemetery

== Bibliography ==
- Ahmed Mahsas (1975). L'autogestion en Algérie: données politiques de ses premières étapes et de son application. Paris: Éditions anthropos. p. 297 pages.
- Ahmed Mahsas (1979). Le mouvement révolutionnaire en Algérie, de la Première Guerre mondiale à 1954: Essai sur la formation du mouvement national. Paris: L'Harmattan. p. 388 pages. ISBN 9782307108948.
- Jean Déjeux (1984). Dictionnaire des auteurs maghrébins de langue française. Paris: Karthala Éditions. p. 156. ISBN 9782865370856.
- Ahmed Mahsas (1990). Le mouvement révolutionnaire en Algérie, de la Première Guerre mondiale à 1954: Essai sur la formation du mouvement national. Algiers: Éditions Barkat. p. 388 pages.
- Guerres mondiales et conflits contemporains, Numéros 205 à 208. Paris: Presses universitaires de France. 2002. p. 73.
- Ahmed Mahsas (2006). Algérie, réalités coloniales et résistances: origines culturelles et socio-économiques de la révolution. Algiers: Éditions El Maârifa. p. 152. ISBN 9789961483831.
- Maurice Faivre (2006). Le renseignement dans la guerre d'Algérie. Panazol: Lavauzelle. p. 83. ISBN 9782702513149.
