= Mostefa Ben Boulaïd =

Algerian revolutionary leader (1917–1956)

- مصطفى بن بولعيد
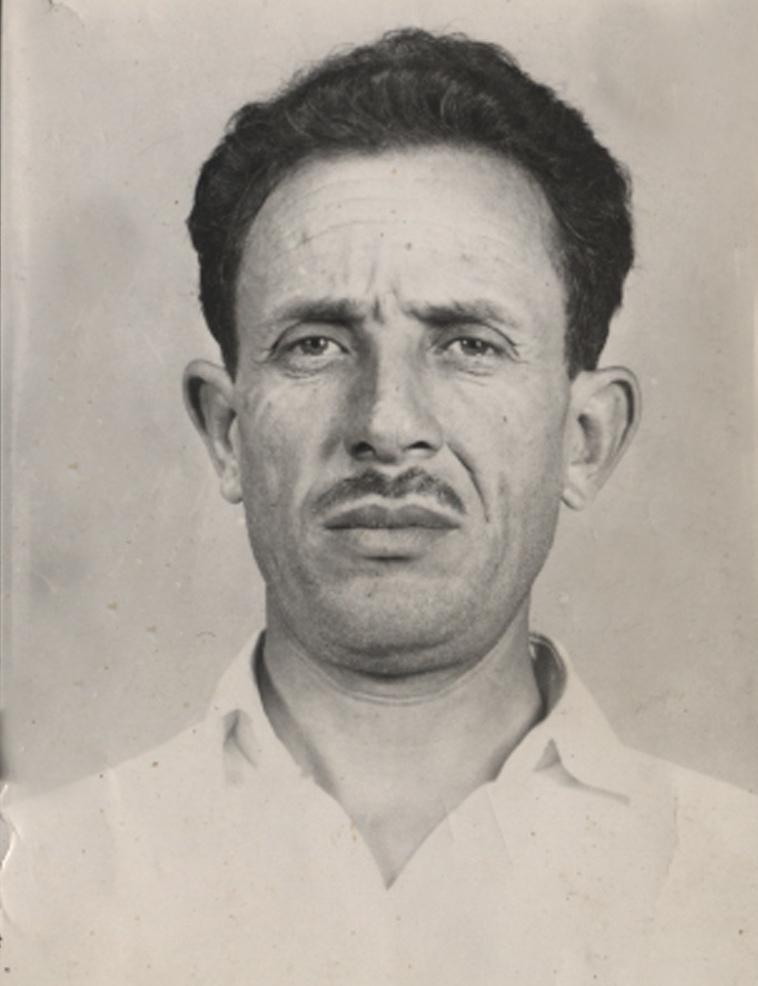
- Ben Boulaïd in 1955
- Born: 5 February 1917; Arris, Batna Province, French Algeria
- Died: 22 March 1956 (aged 39); Arris, Batna Province, Algeria
- Cause of death: Killed in action (Explosion)
- Military career
- Allegiance: FLN
- Branch: ALN
- Rank: Adjutant (French Army); Commander of Wilaya I (ALN)
- Wars: World War II; Algerian War
- Awards: Croix de guerre 1939–1945; Médaille militaire

Mostefa Ben Boulaïd (5 February 1917 – 22 March 1956) was an Algerian revolutionary leader and military commander. Widely recognized as the "Father of the Algerian Revolution", he was a founding member of the National Liberation Front (FLN) in 1954 and commanded the Aurès zone (Wilaya I) at the beginning of the Algerian War.

== Early life and World War II ==
Mostefa Ben Boulaïd was born on 5 February 1917 in Inerkeb, a village in Arris, Batna Province, Algeria. He came from a Berberophone (Chaoui) family belonging to the Touaba (Ouled Daoud) tribe, a prominent group in the Aurès massif.

In 1939, he underwent mandatory military service and was mobilized into the French Army to fight for the Allies during World War II. Distinguishing himself during the Italian campaign in 1944, he exhibited great courage, which earned him the Médaille militaire and the Croix de guerre. He was eventually demobilized with the rank of adjutant and returned to his home in Algeria.

== Nationalist movement ==
Following the war, Ben Boulaïd became deeply involved in Algerian nationalist politics. He joined the Algerian People's Party (PPA) and the Movement for the Triumph of Democratic Liberties (MTLD). He was an active member of the paramilitary Special Organization (OS), where he used his personal funds to purchase weapons and support militants pursued by French authorities.

In 1948, he contested the Assembly of Algeria elections and won his seat decisively, but the colonial administration annulled the results.

== The Algerian War ==
=== Formation of the FLN ===
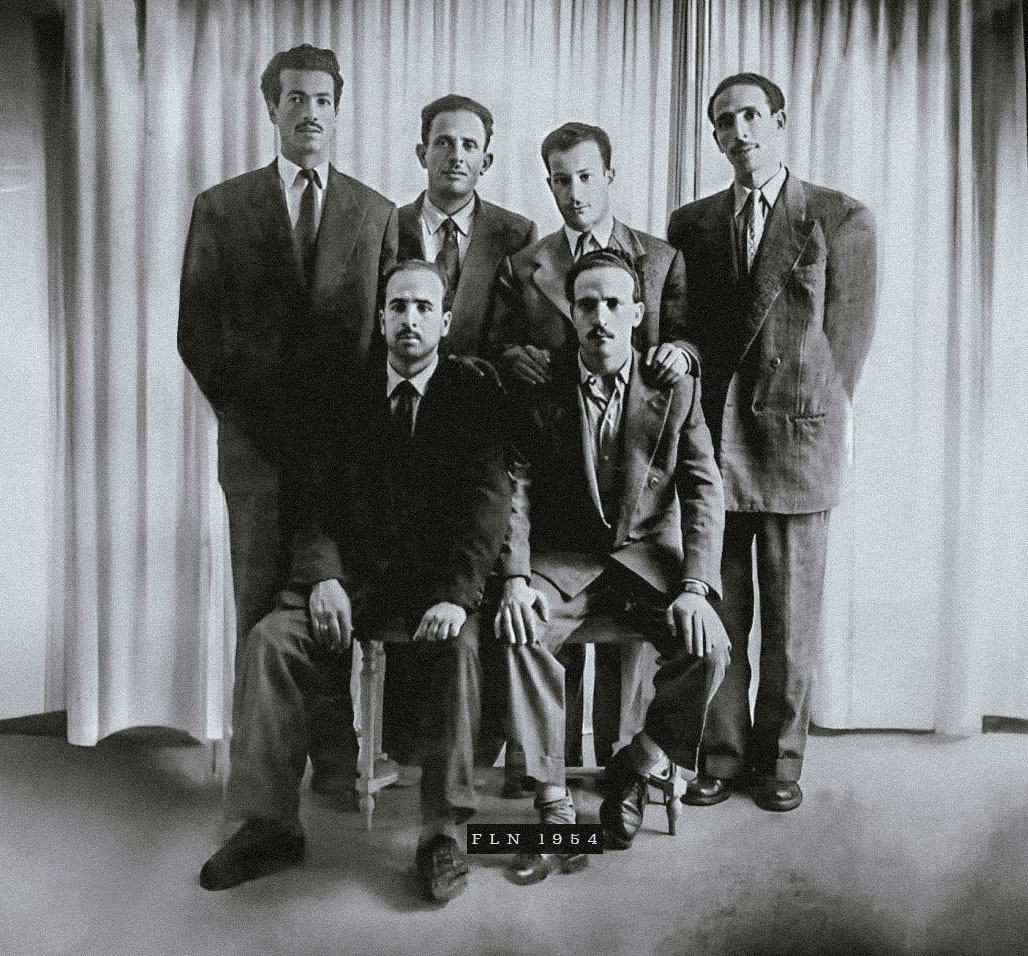
The "Historic Six" prior to the outbreak of the revolution on November 1, 1954. Standing, from left to right: Rabah Bitat, Mostefa Ben Boulaïd, Mourad Didouche, and Mohamed Boudiaf. Seated: Krim Belkacem (left) and Larbi Ben M'hidi (right).

Ben Boulaïd played a critical role in unifying the fractured nationalist movement. He was a founding member of the Revolutionary Committee of Unity and Action (CRUA) and served as one of the "Committee of the Six" (the Historic Six) who planned and initiated the 1 November 1954 uprising.

=== Commander of the Aurès (Wilaya I) ===
When the Algerian War began, Ben Boulaïd took command of Area I (the Aurès). His tactical leadership in the mountainous terrain allowed the heavily outgunned FLN forces to engage in successful hit-and-run guerrilla attacks against French troops, causing significant disruptions, such as during the French Operation Véronique in early 1955. He personally participated in several key battles, including the Battle of Ifri el blah and the Battle of Ahmar Khaddou near Batna.

=== Arrest and escape ===
In early 1955, Ben Boulaïd traveled to Libya to procure arms for the revolution. He was arrested by authorities on 11 February 1955 near the Tunisian border. He was imprisoned at Coudiat Central Prison in Constantine and subsequently sentenced to death.

In November 1955, Ben Boulaïd successfully escaped alongside other inmates (including Tahar Zbiri) with the complicity of a sympathetic prison warden named Djaffer Chérif. Following his escape, he immediately returned to his command position in the Aurès mountains.

== Death ==
On 22 March 1956, Ben Boulaïd was killed in action when a booby-trapped tactical radio device, airdropped by French intelligence services, detonated. His tomb is located in Nara, near Arris in the Batna wilaya.

== Legacy ==
Ben Boulaïd is universally regarded as a towering national hero in Algeria. Monuments, streets, and institutions across the country bear his name. Busts of Ben Boulaïd stand in the main squares of Batna and Arris. The airport in Batna is named Mostefa Ben Boulaïd Airport, and the University of Batna 2 is named Mostefa Ben Boulaïd University.

His image is also featured on the 2000 Algerian dinar banknote alongside the other historic leaders, symbolizing their unified leadership during the revolution. In 2008, his life was the subject of the biographical film Mostefa Ben Boulaïd, directed by Ahmed Rachedi.
