= Lyès Deriche =

Algerian politician

Lyes Deriche إلياس دريش
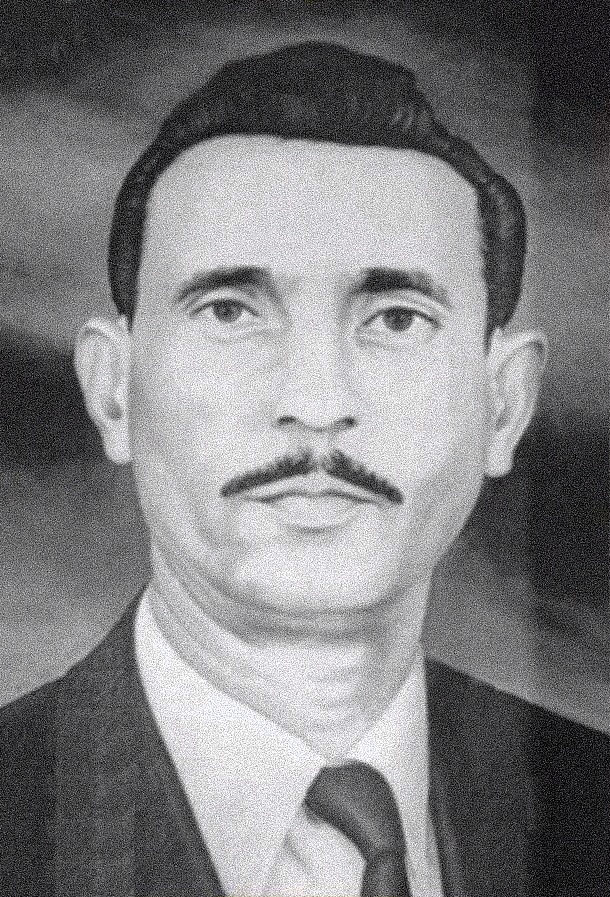
- Lyes Derriche, à ne pas confondre avec Deriche

National Liberation Front Member
- In office 1954–1962

Revolutionary Committee of Unity and Action Member
- In office 1954–1954

Special Organisation Member
- In office 1947–1954

Movement for the Triumph of Democratic Liberties Member
- In office 1948–1952

Personal details
- Born: 14 April 1928 Casbah of Algiers, Algiers, Algeria.
- Died: 29 December 2001 (aged 73) El Madania, Sidi M'Hamed District, Algiers, Algeria.

Lyes Derriche (Arabic: إلياس دريش, 14 April 1928 – 29 December 2001) was an Algerian politician.

== Algerian War ==
Lyès Deriche, the son of Mouhamed Deriche, housed in his villa in the Algerian commune of Clos-Salembier the meeting of the Group of 22 baptized Revolutionary Committee of Unity and Action (RCUA).

On 25 July 1954, in the modest villa belonging to Lyès Deriche, twenty-two Algerians spoke for the unlimited revolution until total independence. They were all elders of the Special Organization who were summoned in the second half of June 1954.

Many of them were from families where there were qaids and bachaghas who had studied in the schools of the Association Of Algerian Muslim scholars.

Lyès Deriche, a friend of Zoubir Bouadjadj, was a former militant of the Movement for the Triumph of Democratic Liberties. He welcomed Mohamed Boudiaf who was the revolutionary leader of Algiers, and had prepared the meal for the participants in the historic meeting.

About noon the owner of the house, Deriche, invited the presents to a couscous, and after a short pause they returned to work.

== See also ==
- List of Algerians
- History of Algeria
- Algerian nationalism
- Algerian National Movement
- French Third Republic
- French Fourth Republic
