= Battle of Douar Souadek =

French victory in the Algerian War

Battle of Douar Sadek
- Part of the Algerian war
Date	18 January 1955
Location	Condé-Smendou, French Algeria
Result	French victory: Mourad Didouche executed; Zone II heavily weakened

Belligerents
France	Front de Libération Nationale

Commanders and leaders
Paul Ducournau; Lt. Madherbe; Col. Terrasson; Cpt. Billand	Mourad Didouche (executed)

Units involved
National Gendarmerie: Mobile Gendarmerie; National Police: CRS; Airborne units	Armée de Libération Nationale: Zone II

Strength
Initial: 20 gendarmes Relief: 3 gendarme platoons (about 90 men); 2 CRS Companies (280 men); Heavy weaponry Total: 390 men Heavy weaponry	10 Fellaghas

Casualties and losses
1 dead 2 wounded (initial fighting); Unknown total casualties	7 dead 2 captured 1 wounded

The Battle of Douar Souadek, or Battle of Boukerker, was a military engagement between the French Army, and the ALN.

== Background ==
In the early morning hours of 1 November 1954, FLN maquisards (guerrillas) attacked military and civilian targets throughout Algeria in what became known as the Toussaint Rouge (Red All-Saints' Day). The country was divided into several Zones, later Wilayas, and each had a leader. The leader of Zone II, was Mourad Didouche, who was one of the six founders of the FLN. He regularly used hit and run tactics to weaken local French elements, and he was also well known to visit individual maquis, to inspect, or train them.

== Battle ==
On 18 January 1955, Mourad Didouche, was at the head of a group of nine Fellaghas, in a local maquis called Douar Souadek located 12 km from the town of Condé-Smendou. He was most likely training them. They were armed with 6 rifles, and 6 pistols. According to the details reported by the La Dépêche de Constantine newspaper, about twenty French gendarmes led by Lieutenant Malherbe had taken the direction of Douar Souadek in the dawn of 18 January 1955. On the spot, near the Boukerker wadi, they were ambushed by the aforementioned maquis.

According to La Dépêche de Constantine, the battle began around 8:30 am. After only a few shots fired, a French gendarme was killed, and two others wounded, while the Algerians suffered no casualties. Seeing the scale of the engagement, Lieutenant Malherbe asked for reinforcements. At the end of the morning, three gendarmerie platoons arrived from Constantine, Azzaba and El Harrouch, followed by two CRS companies, and reportedly a paratrooper one under the command of Paul Ducournau.

Despite their initial successes, the ten Fellaghas got cornered by the numerically superior, and far better armed French units. Despite this, they resisted until about 5:15 pm. By the end of the battle 7 fellaghas died, two were wounded, and one was able to escape, albeit wounded. One of the killed was Mourad Didouche himself.

== Identification of bodies ==
Ever since the beginning of the Organisation spéciale, all officers and leaders had Pseudonyms, as to avoid identification. As such, the French army never realized that one of the killed resistance fighters was Mourad, as they thought that it was instead somebody called Abdelkader.

== See also ==
- Operation Véronique
- Ambush of Palestro
