= Ali Kafi =

Head of state of Algeria from 1992 to 1994

- علي كافي

Chairman of the High Council of State
- In office 2 July 1992 – 31 January 1994
- Prime Minister: Sid Ahmed Ghozali; Belaid Abdessalam; Redha Malek
- Preceded by: Mohamed Boudiaf
- Succeeded by: Liamine Zéroual (as Head of State)

Personal details
- Born: 7 October 1928 El Harrouch, French Algeria
- Died: 16 April 2013 (aged 84) Geneva, Switzerland
- Party: FLN

Military service
- Allegiance: Algeria
- Branch/service: Armée de Libération Nationale (ALN); People's National Army (PNP)
- Years of service: ALN 1954–1962; PNP 1962–?
- Rank: Colonel
- Battles/wars: Algerian War

Ali Kafi (Arabic: علي كافي; ALA-LC: ʿAlī Kāfī; 7 October 1928 – 16 April 2013) was an Algerian politician who was Chairman of the High Council of State and acting President from 1992 to 1994.

== Early life ==
Ali Kafi was born in El Harrouch in 1928.

== Career ==
Ali Kafi was one of the major figures of the Algerian underground forces that fought for independence from France from 1954 to 1962. At that time he was promoted to the rank of colonel. Kafi was the Algerian ambassador to several countries, including Syria, Egypt, Iraq and Italy.

He served as the chairman of the High Council of State (a military-backed collective presidency) of Algeria from 2 July 1992 to 31 January 1994. He was selected as chairman after the assassination of Muhammad Boudiaf, and ruled until his replacement by Liamine Zeroual.

== Death and burial ==
Kafi died at the age of 84 on 16 April 2013 in Geneva, Switzerland. He was buried at El-Alia cemetery, while eight days of national mourning were declared in Algeria.

== Honours ==
=== National honour ===
- Grand Master of the National Order of Merit

Political offices
Preceded by Mohamed Boudiaf	Chairman of the High Council of State; 1992–1994	Succeeded by Liamine Zéroual as Head of State
