= High Council of State (Algeria) =

Collective Algerian presidency, 1992–1994

The High Council of State (Arabic: المجلس الأعلى للدولة) in Algeria was a collective presidency set up by the Algerian High Council of Security on 14 January 1992 following the annulled elections in December 1991.

It originally consisted of:

- Mohamed Boudiaf (PRS)
- Ali Kafi (FLN)
- Redha Malek, Prime Minister (from July 1992)
- Major General Khaled Nezzar, Defense Minister
- Ali Haroun (FLN)
- Tedjini Haddam

Chairman of the HCS was Mohamed Boudiaf from January 16, 1992 until his assassination on June 29, 1992. He was succeeded as Chairman by Ali Kafi until the HCS was replaced by president Liamine Zéroual in January 1994.
