= Djeffal Fayçal =

Algerian professor of engineering technology & applied sciences

- Born: Batna, Algeria
- Citizenship: Algeria
- Scientific career
- Fields: Engineering Technology & Applied Science

Djeffal Fayçal is an Algerian professor of Engineering Technology & Applied Sciences at the University of Batna. He is a Member of Arab-German Academy of Sciences and Humanities, a member of IEEE, a fellow of African Academy of Sciences and a beneficiary of Microsoft - TWAS - AAS Award.

== Education ==
He was born in Batna, Algeria in 1975. He obtained his B.Sc., M. SC and PhD in Electronics from University of Batna in 1998, 2001 and 2006 respectively.

== Scientific contributions ==
He is known for his contributions in the development of a new way to study nanoscale electronic devices and circuits. His research group is credited with the development of a series of novel soft-computing-based approaches (neural networks, genetic algorithms, particle-swarm computations, neural-space mapping, fuzzy logic, and experts systems) for the modeling of nanoscale electronics devices.

== Academic career ==
He joined University of Batna in 2003 where he became assistant professor in 2007. In 2012 he became an associate professor and in 2020 he became a professor.

== Fellowship and membership ==
He is a member of the Scientific Council of the Institute of Electronics, International Association of Engineers and the European Materials Research Society. He is also a Member of Arab-German Academy of Sciences and Humanities, Young The World Academy of Science fellow and a Senior Member of IEEE.

== Awards and honours ==
He received the Shoman Award for Arab Researchers - Engineering Sciences in 2011, and the Microsoft-TWAS-AAS Award in 2010.
