= Special Organization =

Special Organization can refer to:

- Special Organisation (Algeria), a paramilitary group during the Algerian War of Independence
- Special Organization (Ottoman Empire) (Teşkîlât-ı Mahsûsa), a branch of the Ottoman military during the First World War
