= Amar Ouamrane =

Algerian military officer

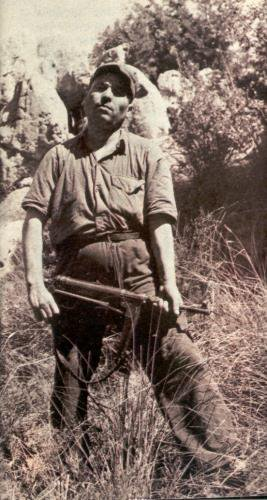
- Nickname: Bu qqaru
- Born: 19 January 1919; Frikat, French Algeria
- Died: 28 July 1992 (aged 72) Algiers, Algeria
- Allegiance: France (1942–1945); PPA-MTLD (1946–1962)
- Service years: 1942–1962
- Rank: Colonel
- Conflicts: World War II; Algerian War

Amar Ouamrane (19 January 1919 - 28 July 1992), nicknamed Bu qqaru, was an Algerian revolutionary and an officer of the National Liberation Army (the paramilitary wing of the National Liberation Front) during the Algerian War.

== Biography ==
Ouamrane was born on 19 January 1919 in Frikat, Tizi Ouzou Province, in French Algeria. Ouamrane joined the ranks of the French army. After obtaining his certificate of primary studies, he entered the military academy of Cherchell where he underwent military training and obtained the rank of sergeant.

He was arrested on 28 May 1945, after refusing to obey orders to kill in the Sétif and Guelma massacre and deserting, and was transferred to the capital, where he was imprisoned, tortured, and sentenced to death on charges of planning to control the barracks. Then, in 1946, an amnesty was granted to him by General Georges Catroux. He returned to Kabylia and became responsible within the PPA-MTLD (Algerian People's Party-Movement for the Triumph of Democratic Liberties) as a deputy to Krim Belkacem. His political activity during the 1946 electoral campaign for the municipal elections led to him being arrested and sentenced to death again, but he managed to escape and was forced to go into hiding until the outbreak of the war.

=== Algerian War ===
On 1 November 1954, at the outbreak of the Algerian War, Amar Ouamrane led military operations in Draâ Ben Khedda. Ouamrane took part in the Soummam Congress in August 1956, at the end of which he rose to the rank of colonel in the ALN. In 1957, he was appointed to the CNRA (National Council of the Algerian Revolution) representing Wilaya IV after the arrest of Rabah Bitat. From 1960, he was appointed representative of the FLN in Lebanon and then in Turkey.
