= El Madania =

Coordinates: 36°45′N 3°04′E

El Madania ⵍⵎⴰⴷⴰⵏⵢⴰ المدنية
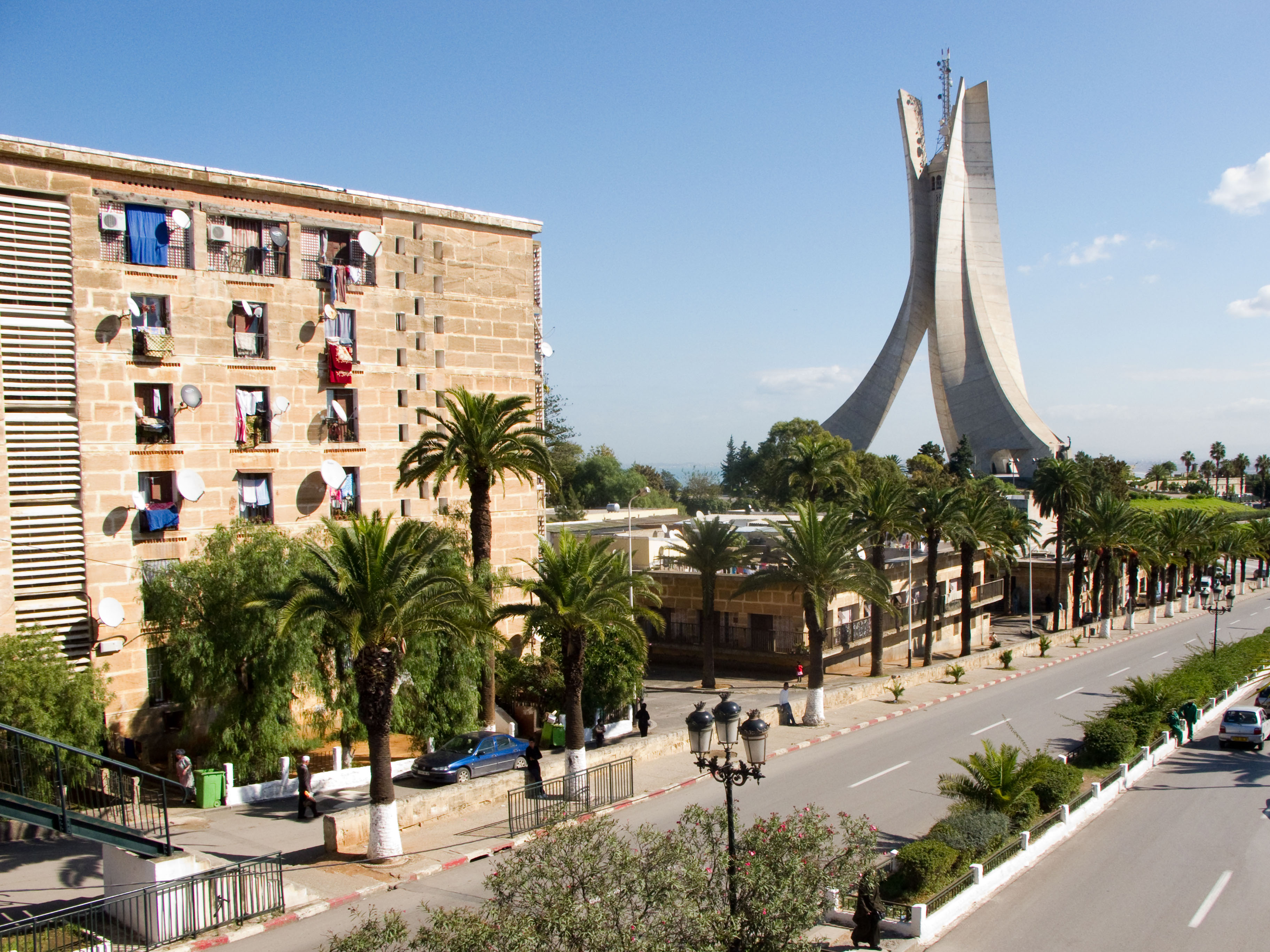

- Country: Algeria
- Province: Algiers
- Time zone: UTC+1 (West Africa Time)
- Postal code: 16075

El Madania (Arabic: المدنية) is a municipality in Algiers Province, Algeria. It is administratively part of Sidi M'Hamed district. Its municipal code is 1603 and postal code is 16075. It has a population of 51,404 as of the 1998 census, which gives it 15 seats in the PMA.

== Notable people ==
- Lyès Deriche, 20th-century leader of the Algerian national political movement against the French.
