= Vice President of Algeria =

Vice president of Algeria was a political position in Algeria. Vice presidency was left vacant during the term of Houari Boumédiène. Vice Presidents were appointed by the president.

== Vice presidents ==
Position	Image	Name	Took office	Left office	President
Vice President		Belkacem Krim	18 September 1958	27 August 1961	Ferhat Abbas
First Vice President		Belkacem Krim	27 August 1961	28 September 1962	Benyoucef Benkhedda
Vice President		Ahmed Ben Bella	27 August 1961	28 September 1962	Benyoucef Benkhedda
Vice President		Mohamed Boudiaf	27 August 1961	28 September 1962	Benyoucef Benkhedda
Vice President		Rabah Bitat	28 September 1962	18 September 1963	Ahmed Ben Bella
First Vice President		Houari Boumedienne	18 September 1963	12 July 1965	Ahmed Ben Bella
Second Vice President		Saïd Mohammedi	18 September 1963	12 July 1965	Ahmed Ben Bella
Third Vice President		Rabah Bitat	18 September 1963	19 November 1963	Ahmed Ben Bella
