= Operation Véronique =

Unsuccessful military operation

- Part of the Algerian War
Date	18 January – 24 February 1955
Location	Aurès, Algeria
Result	FLN victory: Operation Violette; French failure

Belligerents
France	FLN

Commanders and leaders
André Zeller; Paul Cherrière	Mostefa Ben Boulaïd; Bachir Chihani

Strength
5,000 troops Multiple armoured vehicles Air support	354 fellaghas throughout the Aures

Casualties and losses
Unknown	9 dead

Operation Véronique was an unsuccessful military operation undertaken by the French Army during the Algerian War in the hope of eradicating the National Liberation Front (FLN).

== Background ==
The Algerian War, after the Toussaint Rouge terror attacks, was centered on the Aurès and to a lesser extent the Kabylia and Constantine Mountains because of a lack of National Liberation Front (FLN) influence in the rest of the country. That knowledge made the French launch multiple operations into the mountains in the hope of halting the FLN's fledgling rebellion.

== Battle ==
The operation, which was one of the first ones in the Algerian War, encompassed the region of the Ahmar Khaddou mountain in the Aurès. The Operation was developed by the chief of staff of the army, André Zeller, and the chief of staff of the Algerian army, Paul Cherriére. The goal of the operation was to isolate the ALN combatants from the population, who, deprived of supplies by closures, controls and rationing, would no longer provide logistical support to these combatants. The effect of the operation were insignificant, as the military and civil authorities of the region were almost completely ignorant of the social structures of the inhabitants of the Aures, especially the relations established between them and the men of the insurrection, who long before November 1, 1954, were already living in the mountains.

In the first few days of the operation, caves, and other places where Fellaghas hid and were bombed by the Air Force but to no avail. During the operation, napalm bombs were also utilized by the Air Force. The Algerian response, which was organized by Mostefa Ben Boulaid was mostly irregular hit and run attacks, which were rather successful even though the FLN forces in the region were severely underequipped. Towards the end of the operation, the French also started using artillery pieces to bombard suspected rebel positions.

After the capture of Ben Boulaid, the leader of Wilaya I became Bachir Chihani, who commanded the local forces for the last few days of the operation. On the military level and according to the French press, only nine combatants were killed on the Algerian side. The result clearly showed the ineffectiveness of the means implemented in the face of the ALN. This was just one, of many of Paul Cherrière's large-scale sweeps, such as Operations Violette and Eckmühl, all of which were ineffective against the guerilla tactics of the ALN.

== Aftermath ==
The French failure to destroy the roots of the Algerian rebellion caused FLN to rapidly grow in influence over the country. Within months, rural areas of the Aurés Mountains had fallen under FLN control.
