= Assassination of Mohamed Boudiaf =

1992 murder in Annaba, Algeria

- Part of Algerian Civil War
- Mohamed Boudiaf, seconds before his assassination.
- Location: Annaba, Algeria
- Date: 29 June 1992; 34 years ago
- Target: Mohamed Boudiaf
- Attack type: Political assassination
- Weapons: Submachine gun (unspecified); grenade
- Deaths: 1 (Mohamed Boudiaf)
- Injuries: at least 40 killed or wounded
- Perpetrator: Lambarek Boumaarafi
- Motive: Revenge for the 1992 Algerian coup d'état

The assassination of Mohamed Boudiaf took place on 29 June 1992. As Chairman of the High Council of Algeria, Boudiaf was killed by one of his own bodyguards, Lambarek Boumaarafi, who was presented officially as an Islamic fundamentalist, and a sympathiser of the Islamic Salvation Front (FIS), who acted alone. He was assassinated in Annaba while addressing a public meeting, which was later broadcast on national TV.

He was shot three times, twice in the head and once in his back. He was president for only five months, after his return from exile in Morocco to rule over the High Council of State (HCE) that emerged as a constitutional alternative to the Islamic State declared by the FIS after winning the 1991 parliamentary election — the first democratic elections in the country since its independence in 1962. His mission was to crush the FIS, stop the civil war and restore order.

Boudiaf was one of the few veterans of the Algerian War still alive at the time. A number of other veterans had suffered a similar fate, notably Krim Belkacem, assassinated in Frankfurt in 1970, Mohamed Khider assassinated in Madrid in 1967, and foreign minister Mohammed Seddik Benyahia, assassinated on the Iran–Iraq border when working on a walk out from the Iran-Iraq War.

== Assassination ==
The attack began with a grenade explosion on one side of the podium from where Boudiaf was giving his speech, which attracted the attention of Boudiaf and his bodyguards, while another grenade was thrown under his chair. The two blasts were followed by a gunman dressed in the uniform of the elite police intervention unit who emerged from behind Boudiaf, and emptied his sub-machine gun into the President's back. The gunman and at least 40 other people were killed or injured in the attack. Among the wounded were the Minister of Industry and a top provincial official.

== Perpetrator ==
Lambarek Boumaarafi (born 1966 in Meskiana) is a former second lieutenant of the special intervention group (GIS) of the Algerian Army who, on 29 June 1992 in Annaba, assassinated Algerian president Mohamed Boudiaf.

Twenty days after the assassination, a commission of inquiry named immediately after the assassination made its finding: it was a conspiracy. In support of this thesis, the six members of the commission, while noting that Boumaarafi had no "profile" of a kamikaze acting on his own initiative, noted the criminal negligence of security services which facilitated the task of the killer.

He was part of a special operations group (GIS) dependent on Département du Renseignement et de la Sécurité (DRS) responsible for various law enforcement operations. This brigade was theoretically not charged with ensuring the safety of President Boudiaf. This situation, and its confusing explanations, have cast doubt on the reasons that led his superiors to assign him that day to protect the Algerian president.

During the mutiny of Algiers Serkadji prison, in June 1995, that killed 100 people including 96 prisoners, his disappearance was discussed. Boumaarafi currently lives in prison. In June 2007, his father claimed that he was not the perpetrator.

== International circumstances ==
Boudiaf's assassination coincided with the Algerian state-owned oil company Sonatrach's launch in London of a first onshore leasing round in which it sought participation by foreign oil companies in opening up new production facilities in Algeria. Oil prices rose on immediate fears that the killing of Boudiaf might trigger unrest that could hit production, but they fell back later in the day. Sources believe there may be a short-term disruption of exports from Algeria, but the country will have to sell oil eventually.

The United States, the Organization of African Unity, and other western nations condemned the killing. By contrast, the Iranian politician and ayatollah Ahmad Jannati reportedly expressed his pleasure about Boudiaf's death, prompting a harsh denunciation from the Algerians.

The attack on Boudiaf was the Arab world's most dramatic political killing since Egyptian President Anwar Sadat was assassinated by Islamic fundamentalists in 1981.

== See also ==
- Assassination of Anwar Sadat
- Larbi Belkheir Minister of the Interior at the time of the murder
- Mohamed Mediène at the head of Département du Renseignement et de la Sécurité since 1990
