= Party of the Socialist Revolution =

Banned Algerian political party

Party of the Socialist Revolution حزب الثورة الاشتراكية Parti de la Révolution Socialiste
- Abbreviation: PRS
- Leader: Mohamed Boudiaf
- Founded: 20 September 1962
- Dissolved: 1979
- Split from: FLN
- Newspaper: Le Révolutionnaire
- Ideology: Democratic socialism Algerian nationalism (Left-wing nationalism)
- Political position: Left-wing

Party of the Socialist Revolution (Arabic: حزب الثورة الاشتراكية, French: Parti de la Révolution Socialiste was an Algerian nationalist and a democratic socialist clandestine opposition party in Algeria founded in 1962 by Mohamed Boudiaf. The existence of PRS was announced in connection with the election to the National Assembly. The membership of PRS was largely made up by former FLN guerrillas of the Wilaya of Constantine, trade union cadre and Algerian diaspora.

PRS was suppressed by the regime. Boudiaf and other leaders were jailed in the months following the founding of the party.

PRS published Le Révolutionnaire.

In 1965 PRS established its headquarters in France.

The party was unilaterally dissolved by Boudiaf in 1979, after most of his followers had deserted him.
