= Revolutionary Committee of Unity and Action =

Militant group in Algeria

Revolutionary Committee for Unity and Action (in French: Comité Révolutionnaire d'Unité et d'Action) was a militant group in Algeria formed in order to fight French rule. CRUA regrouped former elements of the OS and radical members of the MTLD. The CRUA was founded by 33 members.

CRUA would later evolve into the FLN and produce the Declaration of 1 November 1954 written by the journalist Mohamed Aïchaoui.

== Group of 22 ==
- Mohamed Belouizdad
- Mostefa Ben Boulaïd
- Mohamed Larbi Ben M'Hidi
- Benmostefa Benaouda
- Lakhdar Bentobal
- Rabah Bitat
- Zoubir Bouadjadj
- Said Bouali
- Ahmed Bouchaïb
- Mohamed Boudiaf
- Abdelhafid Boussouf
- Lyès Deriche
- Mourad Didouche
- Abdessalam Habachi
- Abdelkader Lamoudi
- Mohamed Mechati
- Slimane Mellah
- Mohamed Merzoughi
- Badji Mokhtar
- Abdelmalek Ramdane
- Boudjemaa Souidani
- Youcef Zighoud

== See also ==
- Declaration of 1 November 1954
