= University of Batna 2 =

University in Algeria

University Mostefa Ben Boulaïd (UB2)
- جامعة باتنة 2 مصطفى بن بولعيد
- Motto: state et videte (Latin)
- Motto in English: Stand and See
- Type: State
- Established: 1977 (restructured 2015)
- Rector: Smadi Hacene
- Academic staff: 1,833
- Students: 33,458
- Location: Fesdis, Batna, Batna, 05078, Algeria; 35.635°N 6.2774°E
- Campus: Suburban
- Colors: Blue navy, light purple and white
- Website: www.univ-batna2.dz

The University of Batna 2 (Mostefa Ben Boulaïd) (Arabic: جامعة باتنة 2 مصطفى بن بولعيد) is a non-profit Algerian public University located in Fesdis, Wilaya of Batna in Algeria. It was founded in 1977 as University of Batna and then restructured in July 2015 by presidential decree, which led to a split into two distinct universities, namely University of Batna 1 and University of Batna 2. On 4 February 2017, the university was named after the Algerian national Hero Mostefa Ben Boulaïd. Also called the father of the Algerian revolution whose centenary celebration was held in the city of Batna. Now UB2 University Mostefa Ben Boulaïd is one of the largest Universities in Algeria and Africa with its (33.458) enrolled students and (1,833) staff members. Under the authority of the vice-chancellor Dr. Tayeb Bouzid, the university comprises a general management office, four vice-rectorates, five faculties, three institutes, and a central library.

== History ==
In 1977, the university was founded under the name of University of Batna. In the 1980s, it was named after Pr. Abrouk Madani, a former lecturer and researcher who acted as the first Rector. In the 1990s the university structures expanded through the opening of new Faculties and Institutes, which encouraged the rectorate's administration to suggest the name of the Algerian national Hero Mostefa Ben Boulaïd. Also called the father of the Algerian revolution whose centenary celebration was held in the city of Batna on 4 February 2017 in recognition of his great efforts and leadership as the first commander of zone 1 in the Aurès during the Algerian liberation war against the French in the mid-1950s. As of July 2015, the structure was comprising nine faculties, five institutes and a central library. Due to the continuously increasing demand of the baccalaureate holders in Algeria, the Ministry of Higher Education and Scientific Research, with the recommendation of the prime Minister Abdelmalek Sellal, adopted a new decentralization strategy as part of the new LMD (Licence Master Doctorate) orientations for a better and efficient higher educational management. This was a major reconstruction that split the university into 02 distinct Universities, namely: University of Batna 1 and University of Batna 2. Now University of Batna 2 Mostefa Ben Boulaïd is widely known as a science/technology oriented, although it comprises a faculty of medicine including a department of medicine and pharmacy and faculty of Letters and Foreign Languages where English and French departments offer a wide range of courses including the fields of linguistics, didactics, culture and civilization.

== Campus ==
UB2 has five campuses: A main campus located in Fesdis (151 hectares), and four in the centre of city of Batna (19 hectares).

=== Fesdis Main Campus ===
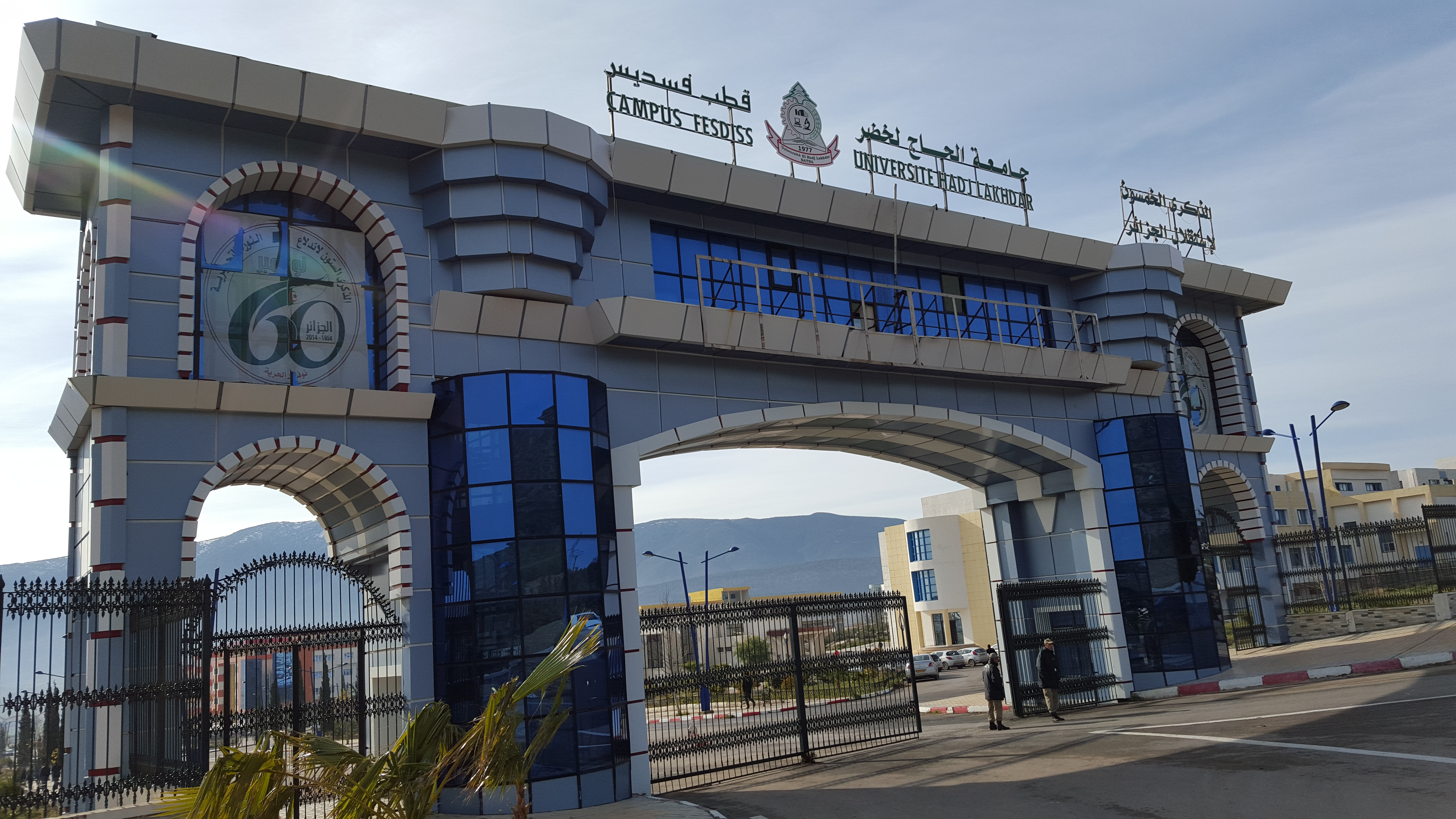
Fesdis main campus

- The total surface of Fesdis Main Campus stretches across 151 hectares, of which 65 hectares are built and intended to academic purposes.

=== Conference Center ===
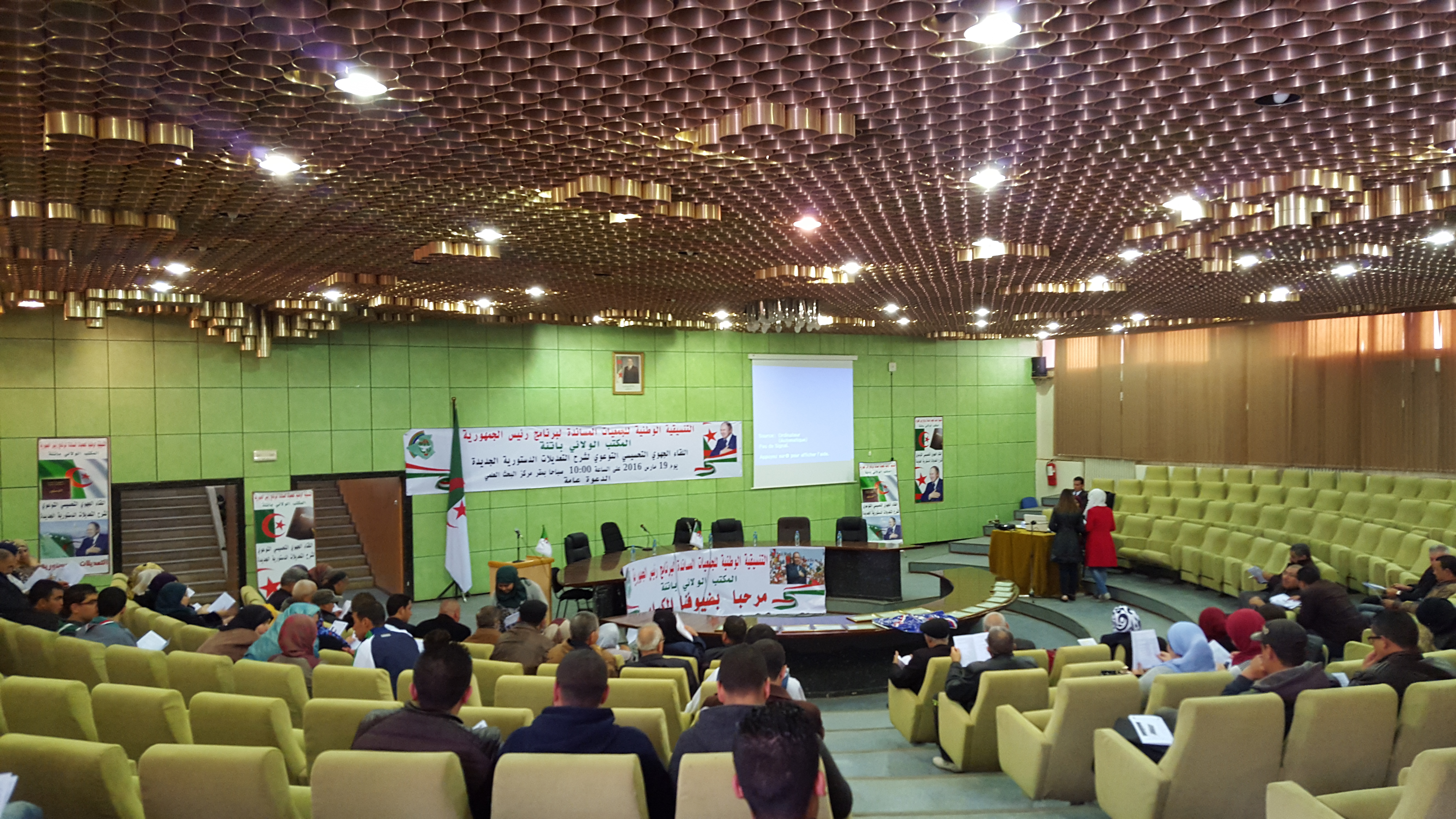
Conference Center "EX Mouhafada"

- Also known as "Ex Mouhafada", the building is in the heart of Batna city with its (3000) sq/m, and considered as the roundabout of most events at University of Batna 2. The campus spans approximately (100) metres of the City Hall (Daira of Batna) at Route de Biskra, 05000 Batna;

=== Central Campus ===
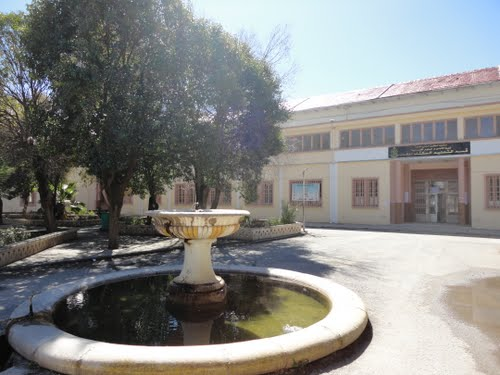
Central Campus: Abrouk Madani Center

- "Abrouk Madani Center" (A.M.C) is campus that is dedicated to students and teachers of technology. The surface of C.A.M. is around (8000) sq/m. This structure is situated in 1, Rue Chahid Boukhlouf Med El Hadi, 05000 Batna.

=== Medical Campus ===
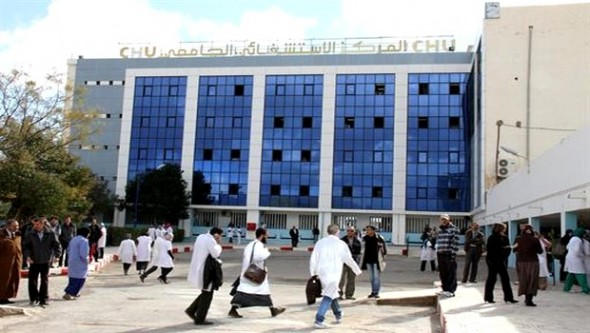
Medical Campus UB2

- Centre Hospitalier Universitaire de Batna also known as CHU Benflis Al-Tohamy University Hospital is one of the largest campuses in Algeria with its 5000 square meters. It has a capacity of 540 rooms and nine medical services, six surgery services and a main emergency pavilion. Med students learn the following disciplines: Internal Medicine, Pediatry, Cardiology, Nephrology, Neuro-endocrinology, Burnings, Hematology, General Surgery, Maxillo-facial, Pediatric Surgery, Urology, Orthopedics, Neurosurgery, Ophthalmology, Legal Medicine, Work Medicine, Neurosurgery, Dermatology, Neurology, Physiology, Rheumatology, Gastroenterology, Epidemiology, Dental surgery.

=== Pharmacy Campus ===
- Located in 742 Lgts district totaling a 3,000-square-metre (32,000 sq ft) surface

== Architecture ==
- Fesdis Main Campus architecture of UB2 has been inspired by the Chicago School. The buildings were designed with a cubic architectural style based on steel-frame construction and solid glasses, which gave the university a futuristic view. The conceptions, designs and constructions were realized by:
1. BET Houcine Abdelaziz
2. BETAC
3. BE/TBatna
4. BET/SEETA
5. BET Hidjazi Cherif
6. BET Hafiane
- The Conference Center was built in the 1970s and was the property of the National Liberation Party (FLN) until the 1990s. Constructed by Algerian entrepreneurs during the era of Socialism, the structure comprises a two-floor building and an fully equipped Auditorium.
- The Central Campus is an old construction that was built by the French in the 18th century. Characterized by French Colonial Style, the Central Campus was initially built as Hospital that served military French troops in the Aures.
- Both Medical and Pharmacy campuses were built in the 1980s and restored in the 2000s to expand the capacity of the structure for Med and Pharm students due to the growing population in Algeria.

== Housing ==
UB2 offers free-of-charge accommodation for more than 3000 students with seven buildings in the Fesdis Main Campus spread over 20 hectares with a capacity of 2000+1000 beds.

== Food Services ==
UB2 has three restaurants and three cafeterias divided as follows: two restaurants plus cafeteria in Fesdis Main Campus, and a restaurant-cafeteria in Central Campus. UB2 offers day service only with more than 6,000 meals served every day.

== Transportation ==
This service at UB2 is run by (French: "Office National des Œuvres Universitaires") (ONOU). It is mainly offering free-of-charge transportation to all students through buses with an overall fleet of 140 owned by private companies. Seventy buses serve the Fesdis Main Campus Line and seventy for the rest of campuses.

== Athletics ==
Fesdis Main Campus has a stadium and a semi-Olympic indoor swimming pool, plus five outdoor sport facilities, and finally an indoor fitness room. The UB2 is currently constructing another space dedicated for athletics, and two outdoor mid-size courtyards for soccer. All these structures are managed by the Physical and Sport Education Institute. Many sport disciplines are offered, such as football, basketball, volleyball, handball, athletics, and swimming.

== Organization and administration ==
The University of Batna two has a front office (French: Rectorat), Cabinet, Management Office (French: Secétariat Général SG), four vice-rectorates, five faculties, three institutes, and a central library.

=== Vice Rectorate ===
- Public & External Affairs
- Graduate Studies & Students' Affairs
- Postgraduate Studies
- Development & Planning

=== Faculties and institutes ===
- Faculty of Medicine
- Faculty of Technology;
- Faculty of Maths & Computing
- Faculty of Life & Natural Science
- Faculty of Letters & Foreign Languages
- Institute of Physical & Sport Education
- Institute of Health & Safety
- Institute of Earth & Universe Science

== University staff ==
UB2 staff is (1,833) divided in (1,220) teachers and 613 employees.

== Graduate and postgraduate programs ==
University Batna 2 has a worldwide recognized educational system, which is part of the LMD reform that was initiated in Europe by the Bologna Process offering Bachelor's, Master's and Doctorate degrees.

=== Graduate program ===
Academic and Professional Master's in Technology, namely Engineering, Electrical Engineering, Mechanical Engineering, and Civil Engineering. Professional training is also part of this program. Enrolled students: 27,700 preparing bachelor's and master's degrees.

=== Postgraduate program ===
Academic Doctorate ES Science and PhD (Doctorate "D"). 1,971 students conduct their research dispatched as follows: 1,183 Doctorate ES Science, PhD 350, and 422 preparing Magister.

=== Post-Doctoral Studies ===
16 Postdoc students undertaking "NEP" National Exceptional Program (French: PNE Programme National Exceptionnel)

=== Sabbatical/Academic year ===
15 scholars for 2015–2016.

== International cooperation and conventions ==
- Erasmus+
- Miscellaneous Exchanges and Conventions

Partnering universities
Counties	No. conventions
USA	01
Italy	02
France	13
Spain	01
Germany	01
Brasil	01
Tunisia	03
Morocco	01
Egypt	02
Russia	01

== The UB2 Open University ==
Online courses via UB2 TV and Radio and E-Learning Platform (Moodle).

== Intensive Language Teaching Center ==
(French: Centre d'Enseignement Intensif des Langues')

The Intensive Language Teaching Center is one of the most important structures in UB2. (1385) students are enrolled through three levels following the Common European Framework of Reference for Languages. The center offers a wide range of intensive teaching covering the many languages with the following number of enrolled students:

- 495 students learning American English
- 390 students learning French
- 190 students learning German
- 40 students learning Chinese
- 5 students learning Amazigh

== Central library ==
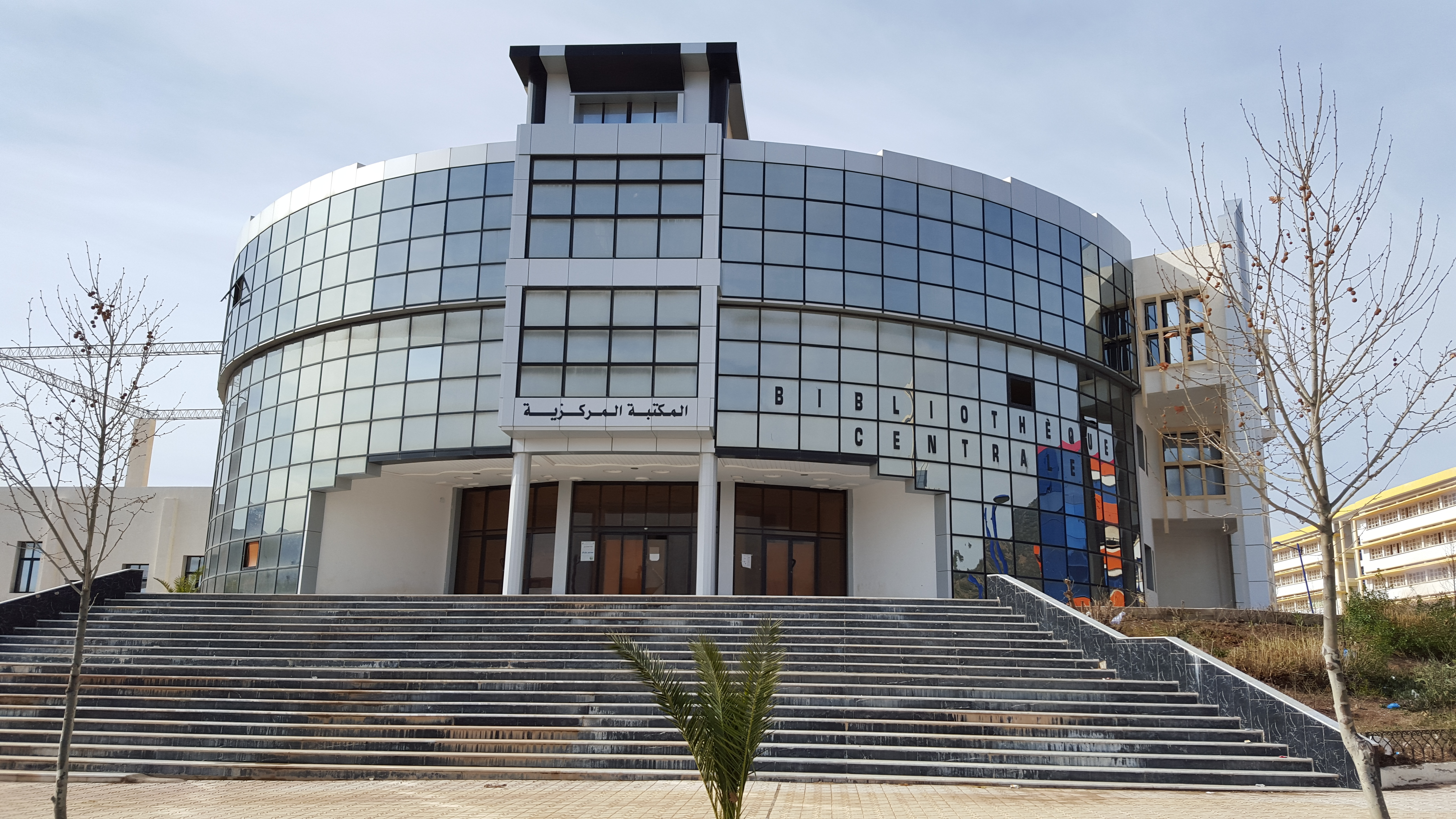
UB2 Central Library at Fesdis Main Campus

UB2 has a central library situated in Fesdis Main Campus, and 8 dedicated faculty and institute libraries.

== Research laboratories ==
There are 15 research laboratories in UB2.

== Students' associations and activities ==
UB2 comprises eight National Students' associations:

1. Union Nationale des Etudiants Algériens
2. Alliance pour le Renouveau
3. Union Générale des Etudiants Algériens
4. Solidarité Nationale des Etudiant
5. Organisation Nationale du Salue Etudiant
6. Ligue Nationale des Etudiants Algériens
7. Union Générale des Etudiants Libres
8. Organisation Nationale des Etudiants Algériens
