= Declaration of 1 November 1954 =

Algerian independentist proclamation

- Author: Mohamed Aïchaoui
- Language: French, Arabic
- Subject: Independence of Algeria from France
- Publisher: National Liberation Front; National Liberation Army
- Publication date: 1 November 1954
- Publication place: French Algeria
- Media type: Manifesto / declaration of independence
- Pages: 2

The "Declaration of 1 November 1954" (Note: Arabic: بيان أول نوفمبر 1954; French: Déclaration du 1er novembre 1954) is the first independentist appeal addressed by the National Liberation Front (FLN) to the Algerian people, marking the start of the Algerian Revolution and the armed action of the National Liberation Army (ALN).

== Historical context ==
When the Movement for the Triumph of Democratic Liberties (MTLD) organized its congress in April 1953, the independence option was decided, but the date for the hasty announcement of the insurrection had not yet been set.

== Writing ==
It was journalist Mohamed Aïchaoui who was entrusted with the task of writing the revolutionary declaration under the supervision of the two leaders Mohamed Boudiaf and Mourad Didouche of the Group of Six.

== Impression ==
The leaflets for this proclamation were drawn in the house of activist Ali Zamoum located in the village of Ighil Imoula in Great Kabylia.

== Distribution ==
These sheets were then put in briefcases and suitcases to be sent to their destinations in Algeria and abroad.

== Presentation and analysis ==
Flag map of Algeria

This declaration aimed at Algerian national independence by:

1. The restoration of the sovereign, democratic and social Algerian state within the framework of Islamic principles.
2. Respect for all fundamental freedoms without distinction of race or religion.

=== Internal goals ===
1. Political cleansing by putting the National Revolutionary Movement back on its true path and thereby annihilating all the vestiges of corruption and reformism, the cause of Algeria's current regression.
2. Gathering and organization of all the healthy energies of the Algerian people for the liquidation of the colonial system.

=== External objectives ===
1. Internationalization of the Algerian problem.
2. Achievement of North African unity in its natural Arab-Islamic framework.
3. Within the framework of the Charter of the United Nations, affirmation of Algerian sympathy towards all nations which would support the liberating action.

=== Means of struggle ===
In accordance with revolutionary principles and taking into account internal and external situations, the continuation of the struggle by all means until the goal of independence is achieved.

To achieve these objectives, the National Liberation Front will have two essential tasks to carry out simultaneously: internal action, both politically and in terms of its action, and external action in order to deal with the Algerian cause which will be a reality for the whole world with the support of all natural allies of Algerians.

This is an overwhelming task which requires the mobilization of all national energies and resources. It is true, the struggle will be long but the outcome is certain.

== See also ==
- Algerian War
- National Liberation Front
- National Liberation Army
- Mohamed Aïchaoui
- Mohamed Boudiaf
- Mourad Didouche
- Rabah Bitat
- Abane Ramdane
