= Mourad Didouche =

Algerian revolutionary (1927–1955)

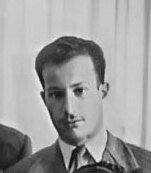
- Didouche in 1954
- Born: July 13, 1927; Algiers, French Algeria
- Died: 18 January 1955 (aged 27); Condé-Smendou, French Algeria
- Cause of death: Killed in action (KIA)
- Other name: Si Abdelkader
- Organization: ALN
- Movement: FLN, CRUA, OS

Mourad Didouche (Kabyle: Muṛad Diduc, Arabic: مراد ديدوش; 1927–1955) was an Algerian revolutionary, and a political and military figure of the Algerian War of Independence.

== Biography ==
Mourad Didouche, nicknamed Si Abdelkader, was born on July 13, 1927, at El Mouradia in Algiers in a family originally from the village of Ibskriène, Aghribs in Kabylia. He did his primary and the junior school in El Mouradia and then studied at the technical high school of Algiers (Ruisseau).

While working as a railway agent to the Algiers Central Station and a militant of the CGT union, Didouche was appointed head of the neighborhoods of El Mouradia, El Madania and Bir Mourad Rais and created in 1946 the troupe Scouts "al -Amal" and the sports team "al- Sarie Riadhi" of Algiers.

In 1947, he organized the municipal elections in his area and also travelled to western Algeria to organize the campaign for the Algerian Assembly. Arrested in a raid, he managed to escape from the court.

From the creation in 1947 of the Special Organization (OS), he was one of its founding and most active members.

Following the descent of "Rehaim" on March 18, 1950; the dismantling of a large part of the organization's network, which resulted in the arrest of 130 people and the discovery of his responsibilities in the structure; and the failure of the French administration to capture him, a judgment was entered against him in absentia that sentenced him to 10 years in prison. In 1952, with Ben Boulaïd, he created the core of a clandestine movement in Algiers, whose mission was to make bombs in anticipation of the outbreak of the "National Revolution".

During the crisis of 1953-1954 and the opposition of the Central Committee of the PPA- MTLD to Messali Hadj, he went to France with the mission to control the Federation. Upon his return to Algiers, he created with eight companions, the Revolutionary Committee of Unity and Action. He also participated in the meeting of 22 held in June 1954 during which the outbreak of the revolution was decided. From the meeting emerged the first Revolutionary Council, which had six members. Didouche Mourad was appointed head of Wilaya 2. Yves Courrière called him the "Saint-Just of the Algerian Revolution".

He was one of the most prominent writers of the Declaration of 1 November 1954 and managed with the help of his assistant Zighoud Youcef to lay the groundwork for a political-military organization.

On January 18, 1955, when he was not yet 28 years old, he died at the Battle of Douar Souadek, (Conde-Smendou), near Constantine. He was the first wilaya leader to fall.

== Legacy ==
The Didouche Mourad county, formerly Bizot, is named in his tribute. It is located on the National 3 between Constantine and the commune of Zighoud Youcef. As well, a major boulevard (once "rue Michelet") that starts at the heights of Algiers (at the Bardo Museum) and ends at the Place Maurice Audin, in central Algiers, is named after him.

== See also ==
- Declaration of 1 November 1954
