= Mohamed Boudiaf =

Head of state of Algeria in 1992

- محمد بوضياف
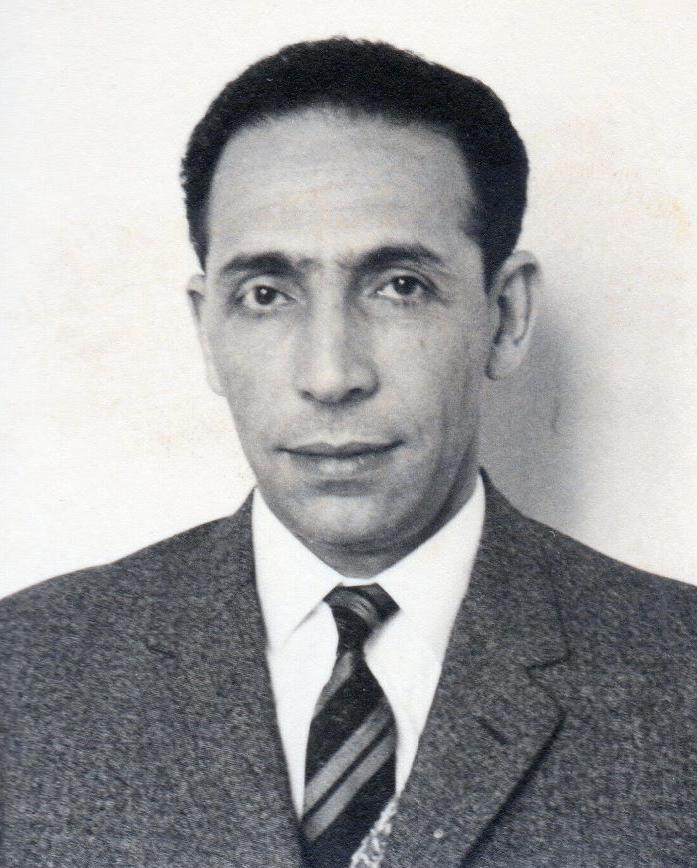

Chairman of the High Council of State
- In office 16 January 1992 – 29 June 1992
- Prime Minister: Sid Ahmed Ghozali
- Preceded by: Abdelmalek Benhabyles (Acting)
- Succeeded by: Ali Kafi

Personal details
- Born: June 23, 1919 Ouled Madhi, M'Sila Province, French Algeria
- Died: June 29, 1992 (aged 73) Annaba, Algeria
- Cause of death: Assassination
- Party: FLN (1954–1962); PRS (1962–1979)
- Spouse: Fatiha
- Children: 1

Mohamed Boudiaf (23 June 1919 – 29 June 1992, Arabic: محمد بوضياف; ALA-LC: Muḥammad Bū-Ḍiyāf), also called Si Tayeb el Watani, was an Algerian politician and statesman, and one of the founders of the revolutionary National Liberation Front (FLN) that led the Algerian War of Independence (1954–1962). Boudiaf was exiled soon after Algeria's independence and did not go back to Algeria for 27 years. He returned in 1992 to accept his appointed position of Chairman of the High Council of State, but he was assassinated four months later.

== Early years ==
Mohamed Boudiaf was born in Ouled Madhi (now in M'Sila Province), French Algeria, to a family of erstwhile nobility which had lost its standing and influence during colonial times. His education was cut short after primary school by poor health (tuberculosis) and his increasing activism in the nascent nationalist movement. During the Second World War, he was drafted into the French Army and fought in the Battle of Monte Cassino. A member of the nationalist Parti du Peuple Algérien (PPA) of Messali Hadj, he later joined the successor organization MTLD and its secret paramilitary wing, the Organisation Spéciale (OS). Boudiaf was responsible for organizing the OS network in the Sétif region, storing arms, collecting funds and preparing guerrilla forces. He was sentenced in absentia to 10 years of prison by the French authorities, but avoided arrest.

When Messali decided to dissolve the OS, his rivals combined with stalwarts of the guerrilla strategy to form the CRUA, a breakout committee designed to lay the groundwork for revolutionary war. Boudiaf was among them, after falling out with Messali, whom he accused of authoritarian tendencies. The CRUA - PPA/MTLD rivalry quickly spiralled towards violence and would continue during the Algerian War until the PPA/MTLD (then reorganized as the Mouvement National Algérien, MNA) was largely destroyed. In July 1954, the CRUA-aligned Boudiaf survived an assassination attempt by his former comrades-in-arms, wounded and left for dead on an Algiers sidewalk.

== Algerian War of Independence ==
The CRUA re-emerged as the Front de Libération Nationale, or FLN, which began a nationwide armed insurrection against France on November 1, 1954. Boudiaf was by this time a main leader of the movement, and emerged as an important member of the exiled leadership working from Cairo and Algeria's neighbouring countries. In 1956, he was captured along with Ahmed Ben Bella and several other FLN leaders in a controversial aircraft hijacking by French forces, and imprisoned in France. While prisoner, he was symbolically elected minister in the FLN's government-in-exile, the GPRA, at its creation in 1958, and re-elected in 1960 and 1961. Additionally, he was named one of the Vice Presidents. He was not released until immediately before the independence of Algeria in 1962, after a brutal eight-year war that had cost between 350,000 and 1.5 million lives.

== After independence: opposition and exile ==
On independence, internal conflict racked the FLN, which split into rival factions as French forces withdrew. A military-political alliance between colonel Houari Boumédiène of the Armée de Libération Nationale (ALN) and Ahmed Ben Bella, of the exiled leadership, brought down their rivals and set up a single-party state under Ben Bella's presidency.

The increasingly marginalized Boudiaf protested these developments, and founded a clandestine opposition party, the PRS, which briefly revolted against the FLN's single-party government. Boudiaf was forced into exile, and settled in neighbouring Morocco. After Colonel Boumédiène's coup d'état in 1965, Boudiaf remained in opposition, as he did under his successor, Colonel Chadli Bendjedid (in power 1979–92). His PRS group remained intermittently active in its opposition towards the government, but for all intents and purposes, Boudiaf had ceased to be a force of any stature in Algerian politics early on after his exile.

== Return as head of state ==
In February 1992, after a 27-year exile in Kenitra, 15 miles north of Morocco's capital Rabat, the military invited him back to become chairman of the High Council of State (HCE) of Algeria, a figurehead body for the military junta, following the annulment of the election results (see Algerian Civil War). He quickly accepted, and was instantly signed into the post. Publicly, he was presented as a leader exiled for too long to be tainted by the violence and corruption of Algeria's internal post-revolutionary politics, but the downside was that he was little known to most of the Algerian public. However, his calls for comprehensive reform and an end to military domination of politics instilled hope, and he quickly gained some popularity, even if many still associated him with the military clique that effectively ruled Algeria in his name.

Even as head of state, Boudiaf was completely dependent on the forces that had brought him to power, and his powers were circumscribed by the military and security establishment. In addition, the country continued to drift towards civil war, with increasing Islamist violence in the regions surrounding Algiers and brutal military countermeasures both escalating the situation. The political scene remained chaotic, the economy was fraying, and Boudiaf seemed unable to effectively carry out the reforms he had promised.

== Assassination and legacy ==
On June 29, 1992, Boudiaf's term as HCE chairman was cut short when he was assassinated by a bodyguard during a televised public speech at the opening of a cultural center in Annaba, on his first visit outside Algiers as head of state. The murder caused intense shock in Algeria, and remains a moment of iconic importance in the country's modern history. Boudiaf himself has gained considerably in political stature after his death, and is now referred to by many political commentators as a martyr for Algeria, with many arguing that he could have been the country's savior. Boudiaf's funeral in Algiers was attended by tens of thousands of people and he was buried in a section for national heroes at El-Alia cemetery in Algiers.

The assassin, Lieutenant Lambarek Boumaarafi, was said to have acted as a lone gunman due to his Islamist sympathies. He was sentenced to death in a closed trial in 1995, but the sentence was not carried out. The murder has been subject to significant controversy and a major magnet for Algerian conspiracy theories, with many suggesting that Boudiaf was in fact assassinated by the military establishment responsible for the coup (and for his installment as HCE chairman). These theories have centered on the fact that Boudiaf had recently initiated a drive against the corruption of the Algerian regime, and stripped several important military officials of their posts.

Boudiaf was survived by his wife, Fatiha. She remains insistent that his death has not been properly investigated.

== Personal life ==
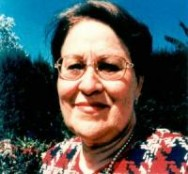
Undated photograph of Fatiha Boudiaf.

Boudiaf was married to Fatiha (born 1944) and had one son, Nacer (1963-2025). His wife, Fatiha Boudiaf, is an activist. After his assassination in 1992, she set up the Boudiaf Foundation to spread her husband's message of peace. She has been outspoken against the conviction of Lambarek Boumaarafi, saying that a larger conspiracy was involved in the death of her ex-husband and has demanded that the investigation is reopened. She denounced the official investigation of her husband's assassination, suggesting that it was not the work of a lone fanatic but part of a greater plot. She has attempted to visit Lambarek Boumaarafi, the man who was convicted of the murder of her husband, while he is in prison, but this request has been refused by the authorities.

She theorised that the person who killed her husband hid under the table in front of him at the time and is yet to be arrested. In 2016, she accused four former senior army officers of the murder of her husband, and sent an open letter to the former President, Abdelaziz Bouteflika, demanding that the case was reopened.

She set up the Boudiaf Foundation, for which she received the Prince of Asturias Award for International Cooperation in 1998. The foundation is set up in honour of her deceased husband, and hopes to spread a message of peace and education for all citizens of Algeria. Each year on the anniversary of his death, it celebrates his life.

== Honours ==
=== National honour ===
- Grand Master of the National Order of Merit

=== Foreign honour ===
- France:
  - Croix de Guerre
  - Médaille militaire

== See also ==
- Declaration of 1 November 1954
- List of heads of state and government who were assassinated or executed

Political offices
Preceded by Abdelmalek Benhabyles; Acting as President of the Republic	Chairman of the High Council of State; 1992	Succeeded by Ali Kafi
