= Special Organisation (Algeria) =

Algerian secret paramilitary organization

The Special Organisation (French: Organisation spéciale) was a secret paramilitary organisation in colonial Algeria, founded by Mohamed Belouizdad of the Movement for the Triumph of Democratic Liberties (MTLD) in 1947 to prepare for armed struggle against France, which ruled Algeria as a colony since 1830. The turn towards guerrilla warfare was in large part the result of the reactions to the fraudulent elections to the Algerian Assembly in 1948 and later, decided and justified by the Governor-General of Algeria Marcel-Edmond Naegelen, and reactions to the Sétif massacre in 1945, and other examples of violent repression, which all convinced Algerian activists from 1948 onwards that peaceful political work would be pointless.

The OS had around 1,500-2,000 members at its peak, and spawned the groups that would later form the FLN; this group, in turn, became the leading force in the Algerian War of Independence (1954–1962), and later Algeria's single ruling party until 1989.

The OS was dismantled by French police in 1950, and many members imprisoned. Only the units in Aurès and Kabylie remained active at the time.

The Revolutionary Committee for Unity and Action (in French: CRUA - Comité Révolutionnaire d'Unité et d'Action) was formed when the OS was dismantled, and included former members of the OS and radical members of the MTLD. The CRUA was founded by 33 persons.

CRUA would later evolve into the FLN, and produce the Declaration of 1 November 1954 written by the journalist Mohamed Aïchaoui.

== Notable members ==
- Ahmed Ben Bella
- Ahmed Mahsas
- Hocine Aït Ahmed
- Mohamed Aïchaoui
- Mohamed Belouizdad
- Mohamed Boudiaf
- Mourad Didouche
- Yahia Boushaki
- Tahar Rabia
