= National Liberation Army (Algeria) =

Military of the Algerian FLN (1954–1962)

- جيش التحرير الوطني الجزائري; Armée de libération nationale
- Flag of the FLN and the GPRA
- Other name: ALN
- Founded: 24 October 1954
- Dissolved: 10 July 1962
- Country: Algeria
- Active regions: French Algeria; Tunisia; Morocco; Metropolitan France
- Ideology: Algerian nationalism Arab socialism
- Political position: Big tent
- Size: 40,000 (1957); 90,000 (1958); 120,000 (1962)
- Part of: FLN
- Wars: Algerian War: Battle of Douar Souadek; First Battle of El Djorf; Battle of Philippeville; Battle of Algiers; Battle of Bouzegza; Battle of Bab El Bekkouche; Battle of the borders

The National Liberation Army or ALN (Arabic: جيش التحرير الوطني الجزائري, romanized: Jaīš al-taḥrīr al-waṭanī al-jazāʾirī; French: Armée de libération nationale) was the armed wing of the nationalist National Liberation Front of Algeria during the Algerian War. After Algeria won its independence from France in 1962, the ALN was converted into the regular Algerian People's National Armed Forces.

== History ==
=== Algerian Revolution ===
The Front de Libération Nationale (National Liberation Front) was established by the Comité Révolutionnaire d'Unité et d'Action (Revolutionary Committee of Unity and Action) and organised in March 1954. Around two years later this group absorbed most but not all the Algerian nationalist organisations. It then re-organised itself and established a provisional government. This government included five members in executive and legislative bodies; all the members were district heads. During the ongoing war of independence in Algeria; Colonel Houari Boumedienne (the future President of Algeria) led the military wing of the FLN, the National Liberation Army, against the French.

The group grew to nearly 40,000 men in 1957, while France deployed 400,000 soldiers, starting in 1956, in response. The ALN established camps across the borders of Tunisia and Morocco to provide logistical support and arms to their fighters in Algeria. The struggle between the ALN and the French continued until 18 March 1962, when both parties signed a ceasefire in Évian-les-Bains. A referendum, held in Algeria on 1 July as part of the Évian Agreement, led to an overwhelming victory for the separatists, who declared independence two days later.

=== Post-war ===
On the morning of 5 July 1962 seven companies of ALN soldiers entering the city of Oran were fired on by some Pied-Noirs, white Europeans who were born in colonial Algeria. An outraged Arab mob swept into the Pied-Noir neighbourhoods, which had already been largely vacated, and attacked the estimated 40,000 remaining pieds-noirs there. The violence lasted several hours until it was ended by the deployment of French Gendarmerie.

== Gallery ==
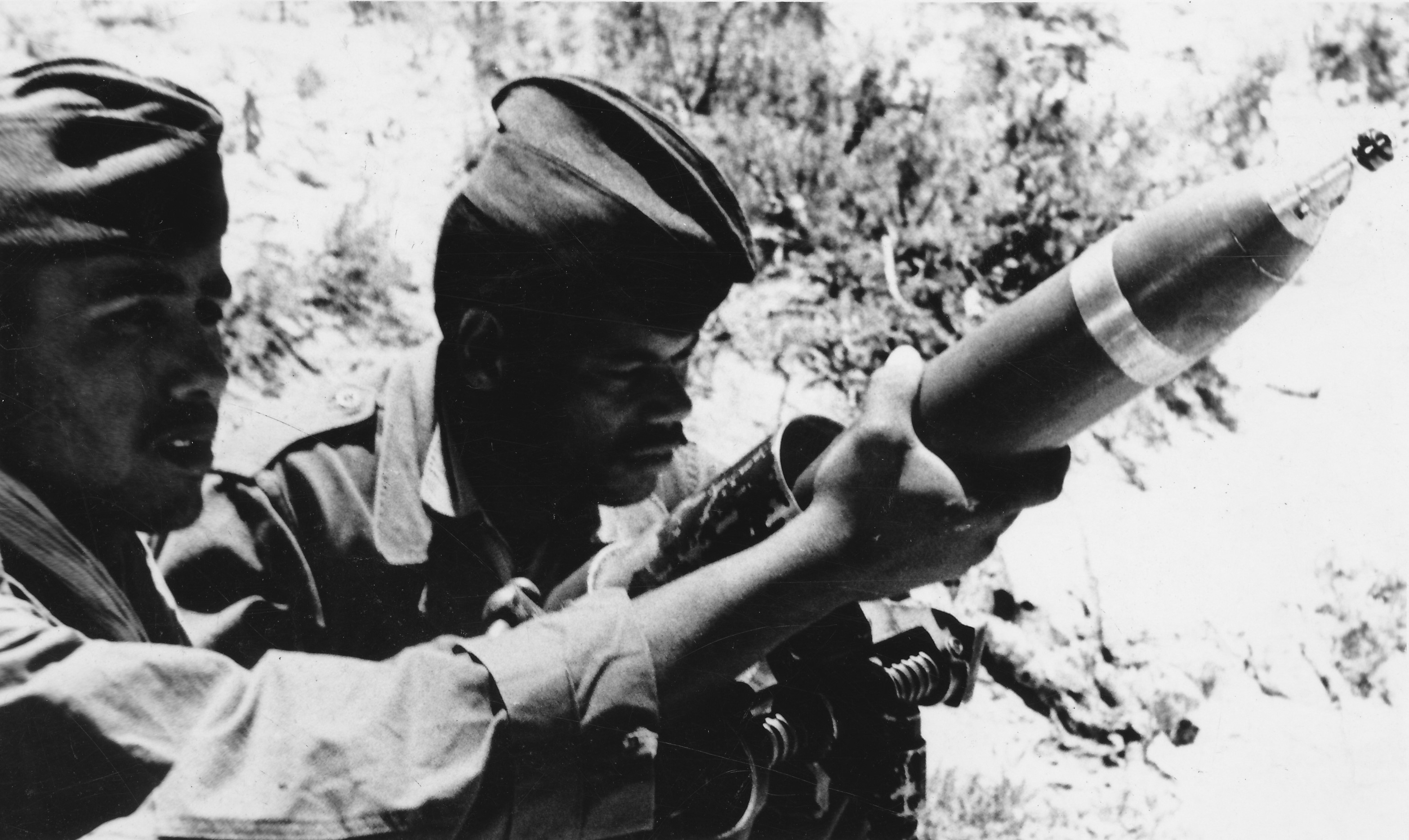
NLA soldiers with a mortar

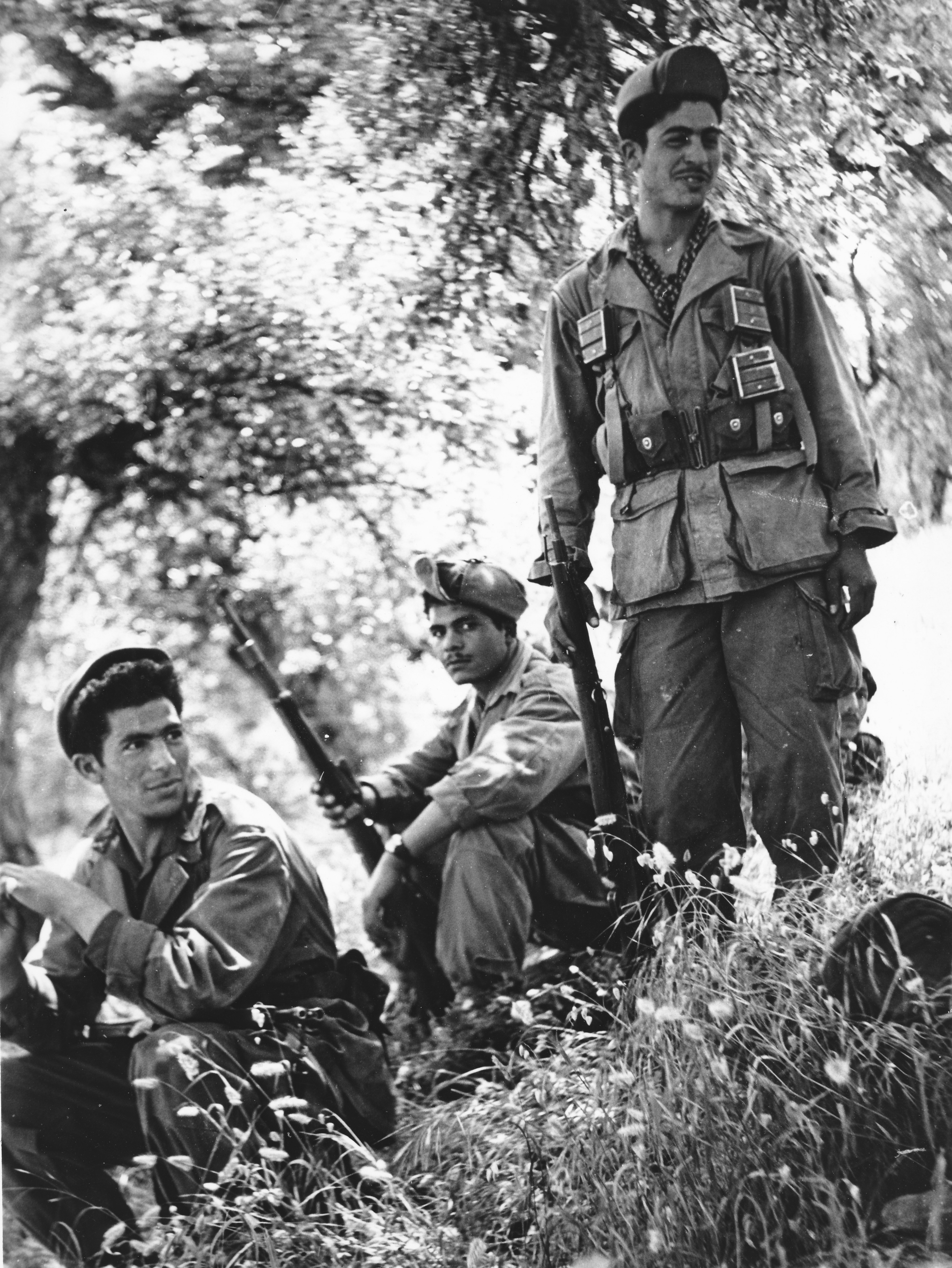
NLA soldiers

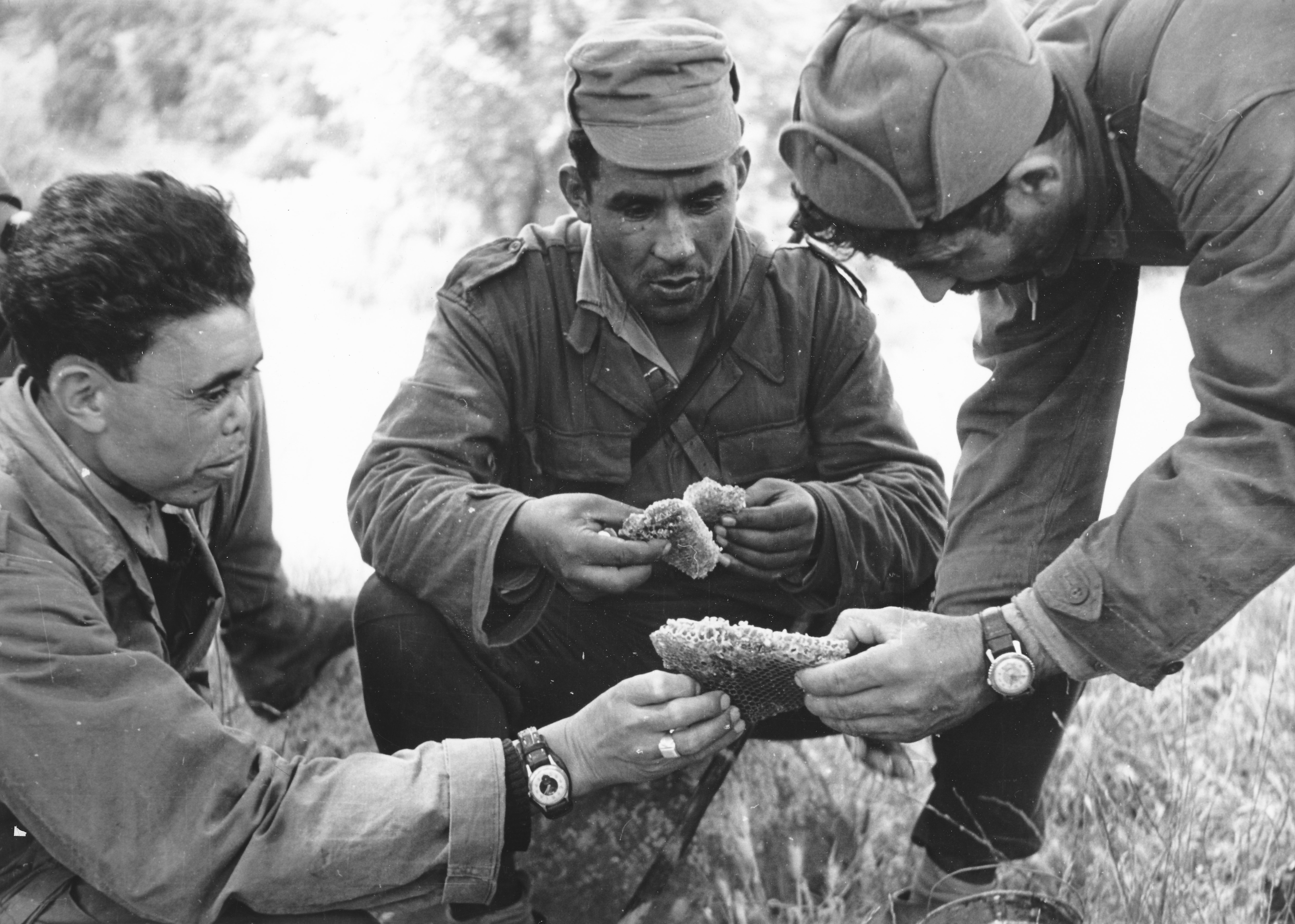
NLA soldiers eating

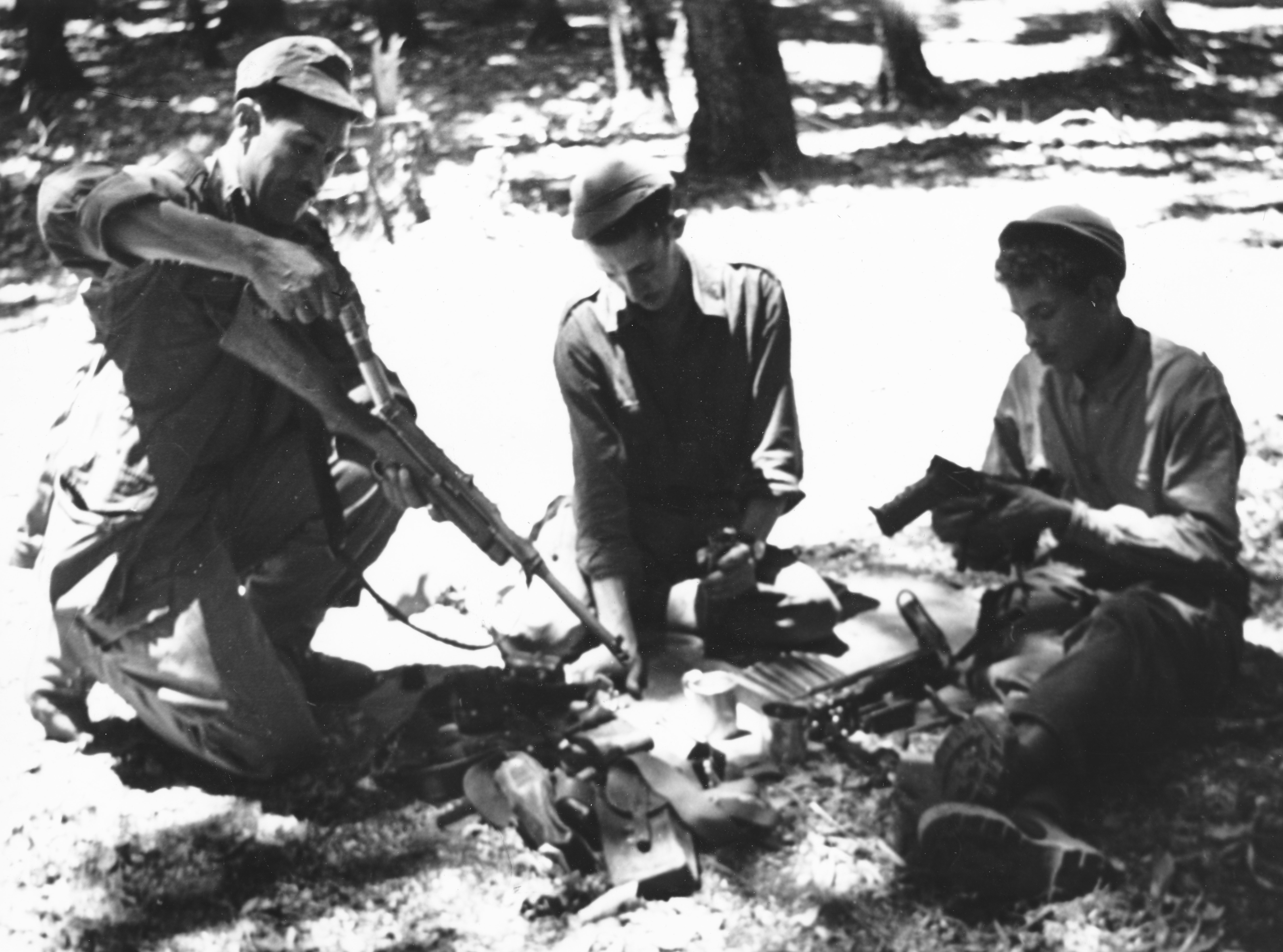
NLA soldiers cleaning their weapons

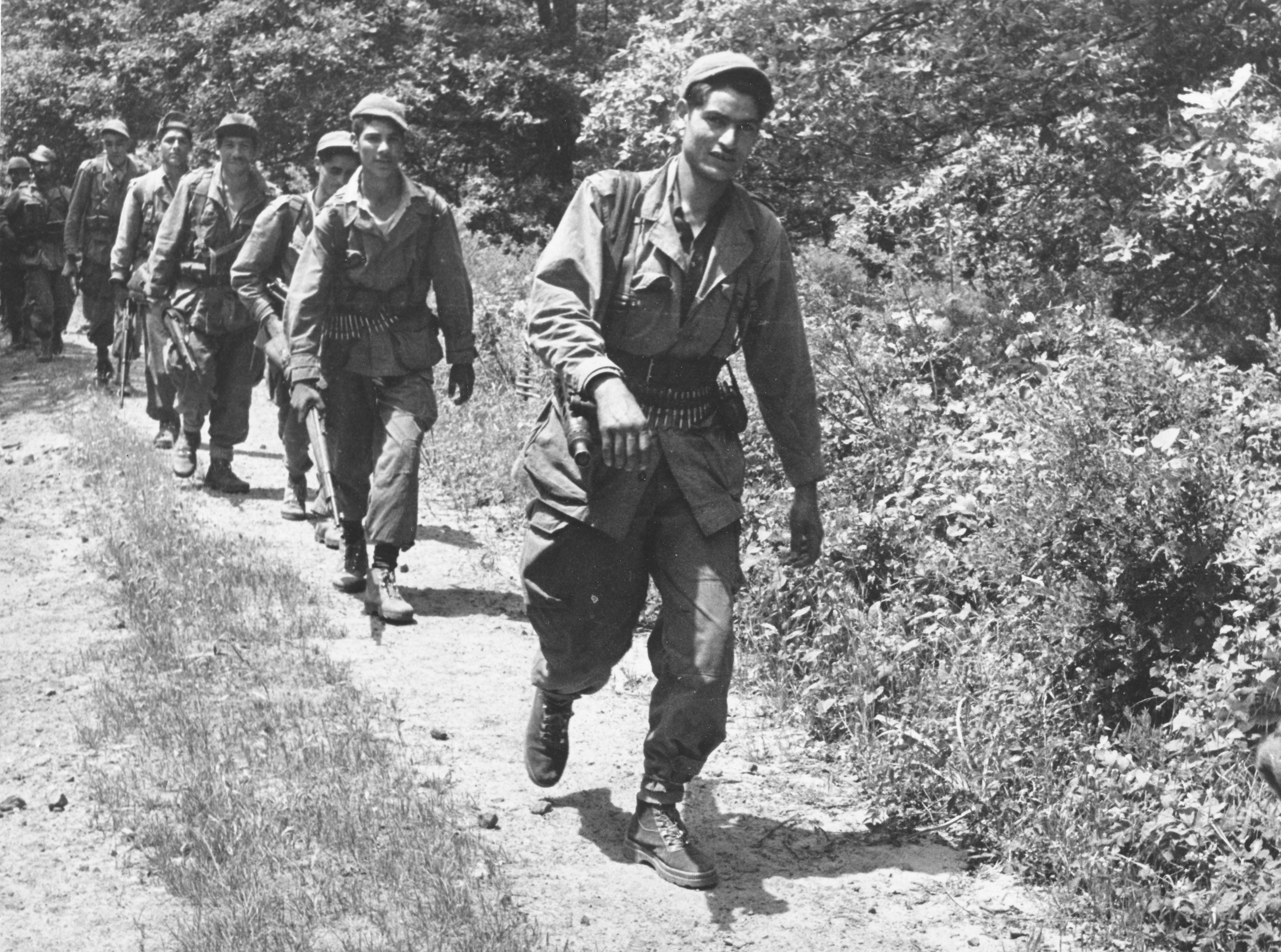
NLA soldiers marching

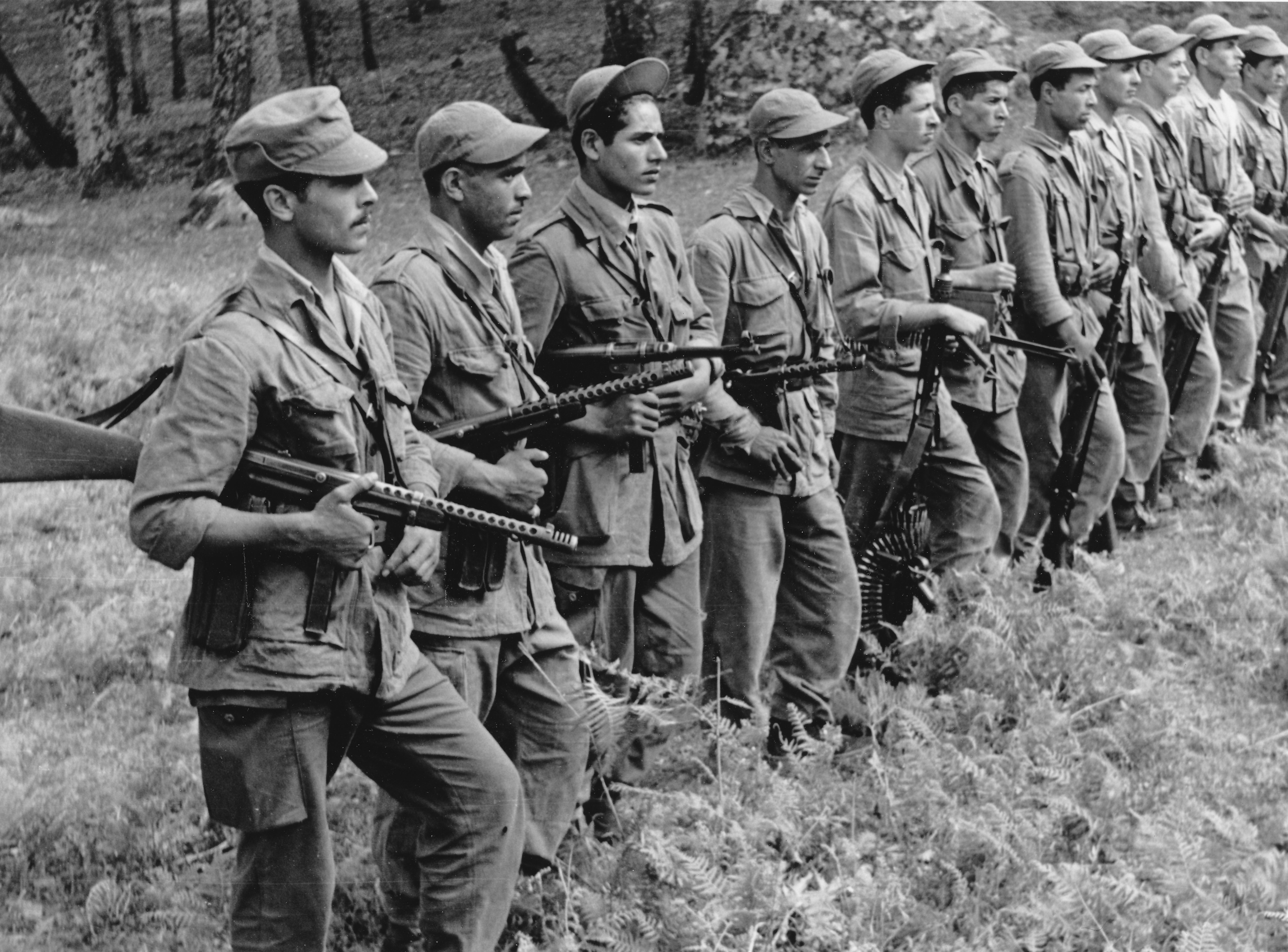
NLA soldiers in line

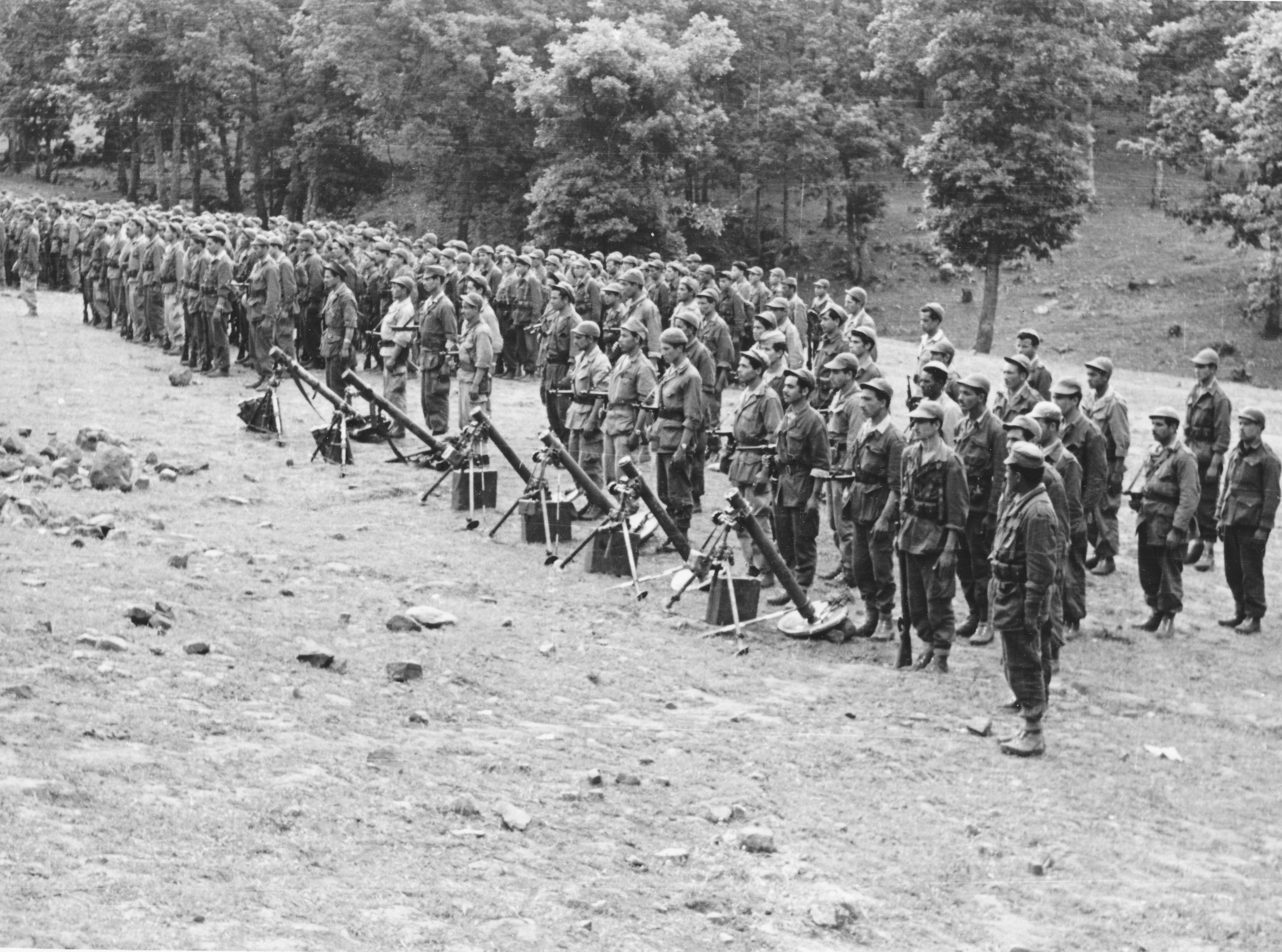
NLA soldiers

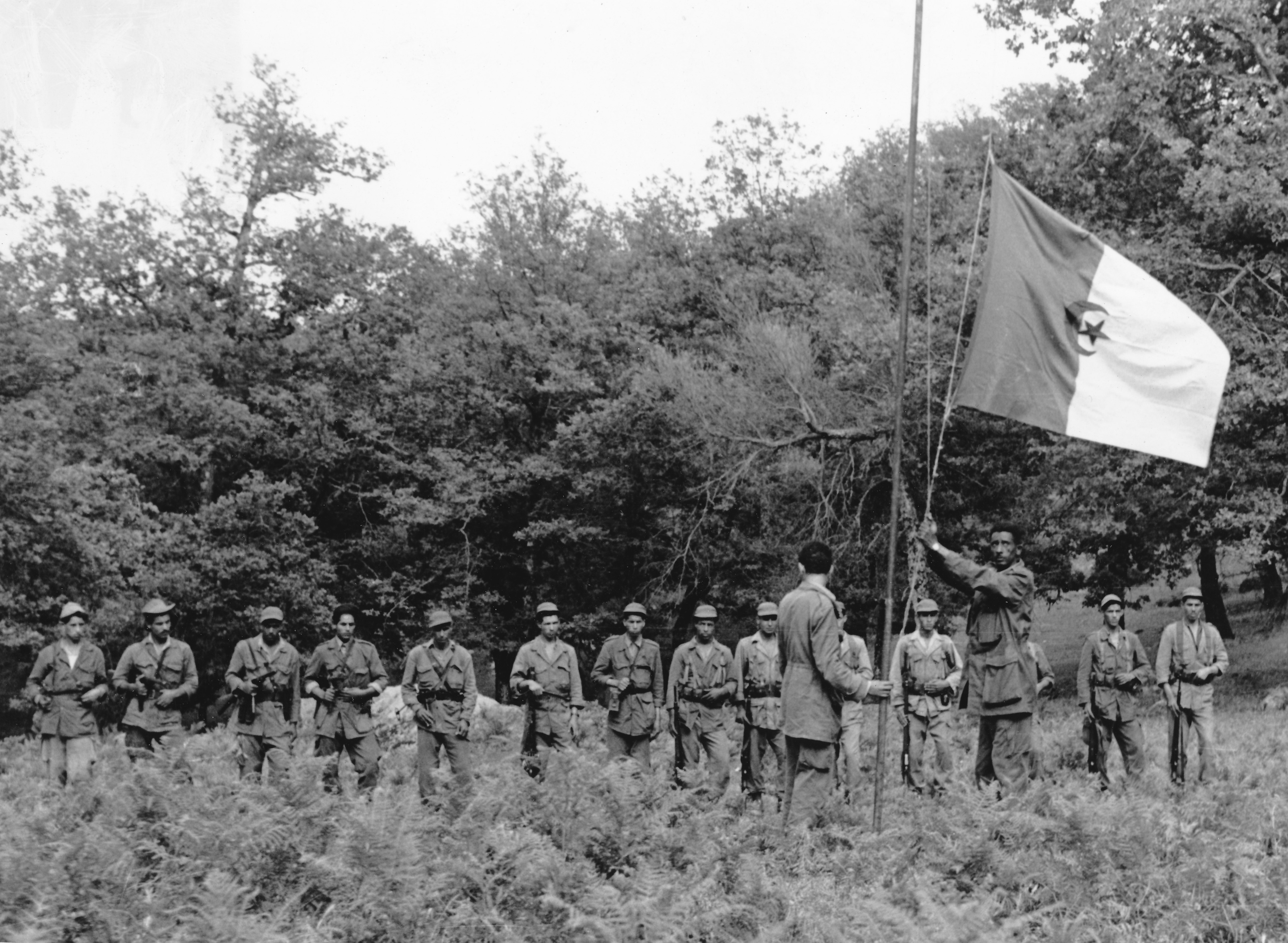
NLA soldiers with the Algerian flag

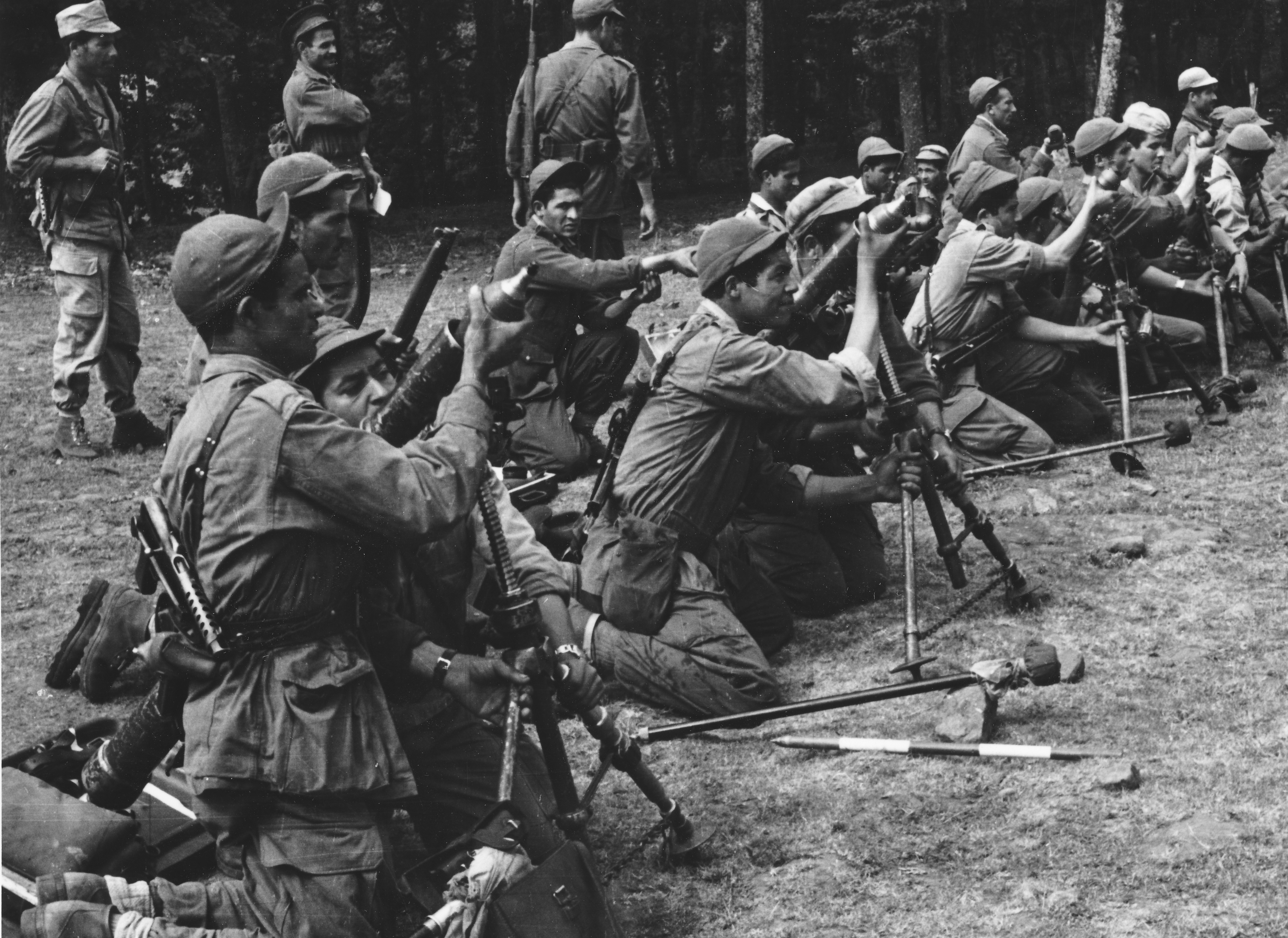
NLA training

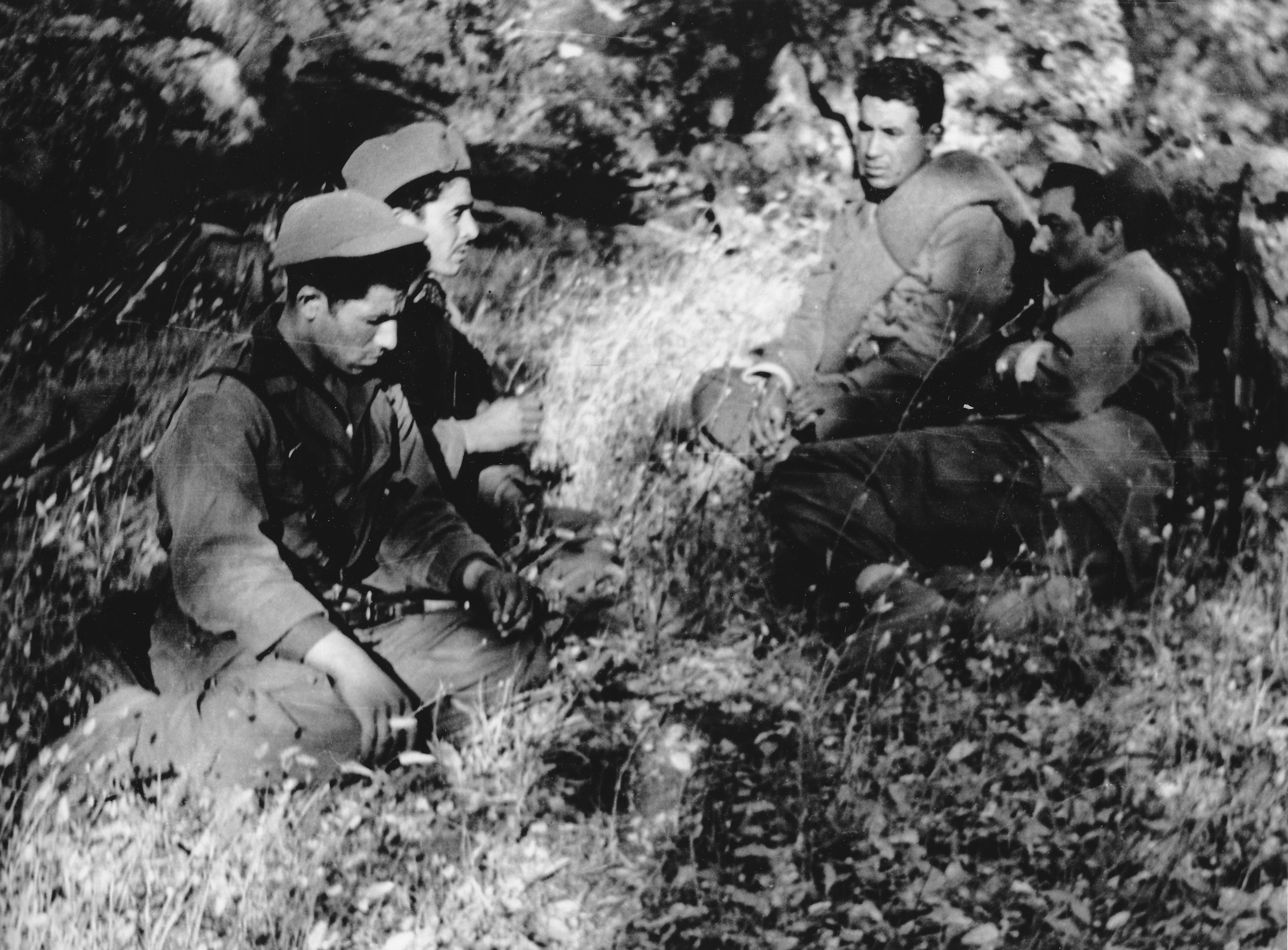
NLA soldiers resting

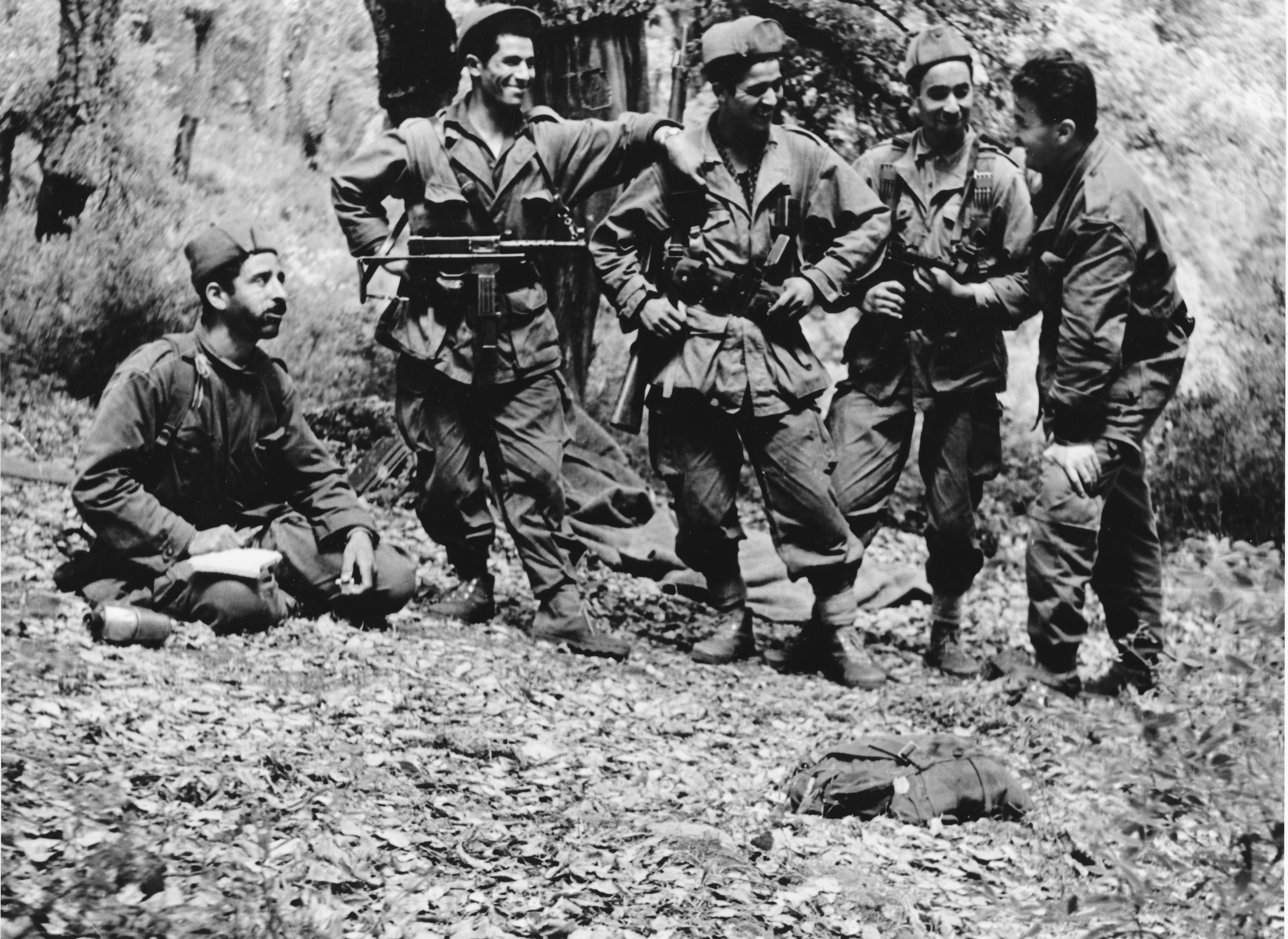
NLA soldiers with the Yugoslav journalist Zdravko Pečar

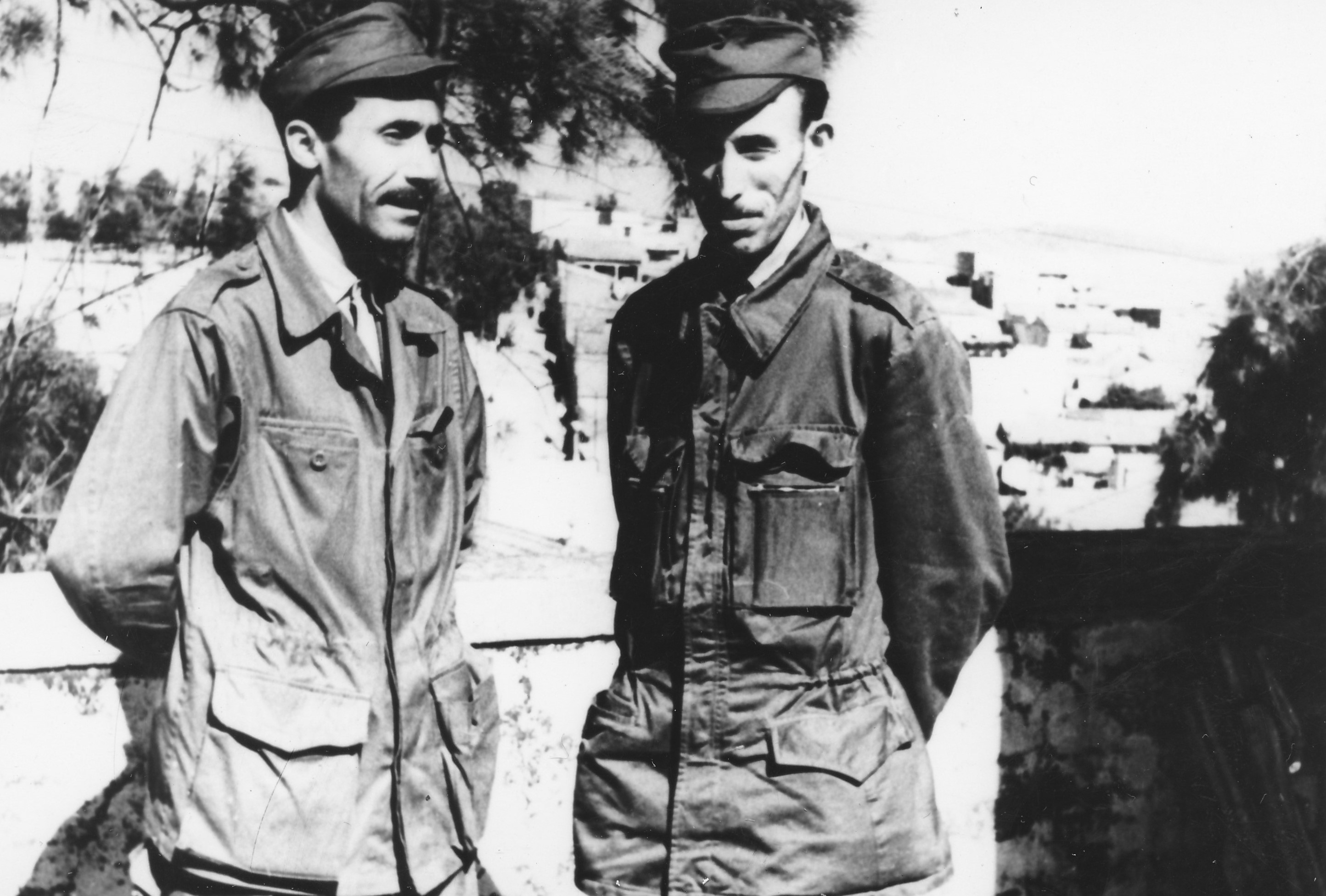
Houari Boumediène in uniform during the Algerian War of Independence

== Bibliography ==
- Federal Research Division (May 2008). "Country Profile: Algeria" (PDF). Library of Congress (May 2008 ed.).
- Horne, Alistair (1978). A Savage War of Peace: Algeria, 1954–1962. Viking Press. ISBN 978-067-0619-641.
