= Algerian nationalism =

Nationalism in Algeria

Flag of Algeria

Algerian nationalism is pride in the Algerian identity and culture. It has been historically influenced by the conflicts between the Regency of Algiers and European countries, the French conquest of Algeria and the subsequent French colonial rule in Algeria, the Algerian War, and since independence by Arab nationalism, Arab socialism, pan-Arabism, and Islamism.

== Early manifestations ==
=== Formation of the Algerian identity ===
It is hard to designate when Algerian identity formed. Medieval Islamic chroniclers divided the Maghreb region into three distinctive geographical and cultural regions before the Regency of Algiers (Dawla al-Jaza'ir) was established.

- al-Maghrib al-Adna (the near Maghrib; also known as Ifriqiya), which included the lands extending from Alexandria to Tarabulus (modern-day Tripoli) in the west.
- al-Maghrib al-Awsat (the middle Maghrib), which extended from Tripoli to Bijaya (Béjaïa).
- al-Maghrib al-Aqsa (the far Maghrib), which extended from Tahart (Tiaret) to the Atlantic Ocean.

The exact borders of these regions were flexible and were not fixed at that time. After the collapse of the Almohad Caliphate the empire was divided by 3 dynasties: The Merinids in al-Aqsa (Morocco), the Zayyanids in al-Awsat (between Algiers and western Kabylia), and finally the Hafsids in Ifriqiya (from Béjaïa to Tripoli), but there existed dynasties controlling these regions previously, and the borders were constantly changing between these 3 rival dynasties.

The area of the Central Maghreb (Maghreb al-Awsat) or what could be seen as the predecessor of Algeria were defined as being between Algiers in the west, and Annaba in the east by most medieval chroniclers such as Ibn Khaldun, although this was not always the case and some defined different borders for it.

O people of Tlemcen, do you not know that this land [Maghreb al-Awsat] is the country of our fathers and our ancestors, which we have inherited from generation to generation from the time of Yaghmurāsan ibn Zayān until today? Khayr al-Dīn will not stop until he sends envoys to threaten us and seize our property every year. Was it not true that the province of Algiers was in our possession and that our sovereignty extended to M'sila, as was mentioned for our ancestors among the kings? The case now concerns Khayr al-Dīn, whom the winds of exile carried from the lands of foreigners to our lands. He would hope to take from us what is in our hands and expel us from the kingdom of our fathers and ancestors.

— Abu Hammu III, Zayyanid sultan, Manuscript of the Sīrat al-Mujāhid Khayr al-Dīn, p. 34

=== Regency of Algiers (1515-1830) ===
The transition from "Central Maghrebi" to the "Algerian" identity started in the early 16th century, with the establishment of the Regency of Algiers ("Dawlat Al-Jaza'ir", or "State of Algeria" in Arabic). Several patriotic works such as the Sirat al-Mujahid Khayr al-Din were created in this era, and it is in this era that Algerian identity and patriotism really took shape. The state of Algiers, while initially independent, came under Ottoman rule in 1520, and gained significant autonomy over the years until it became de fact independent in 1710. In this era Algerian patriotism at this time was mainly influenced by conflicts with the neighbouring Morocco and Tunisia, and conflicts with European states, mainly Spain and France, with sayings such as "Algiers is protected by Allah" becoming extremely popular after the failed Algiers expedition in 1541. Generally, the Algerian authorities classified people into 5 main groups:

- Moors (ساراكينوس, or "Sarākīnūs"). Referring to the urban population often descended or mixed with Moorish refugees from Al-Andalus.
- Bedouins (بدوي, or "Badawī"). Referring to the various Arab or Arabized Berber nomadic tribes of Algeria.
- Kabyles (القبايل, or "al-Qabāyel"). Referring to all Berber peoples of the region meaning "the tribes".
- Turks (الأتراك, or "Al-Atrāk"). A general classification from all people from the Ottoman Empire, including Turkish, Albanian, Greek people.
- Jews (اليهود, or "Yahūd"). Referring to the mainly Sephardi and Mizrahi Jews of Algeria.

The earliest surviving nationalistic Algerian work was written by Hamdan ben Othman Khodja, an ex-diplomat of the Regency, 3 years after its collapse in 1833. Ideological disagreements still existed at this era. Many local leaders wished to see the Regency of Algiers go and instead a completely independent Algerian state be established, such as Muhieddiene al-Hassani and his son Abdelkader ibn Muhieddine, and there had been tensions in the country regarding modernisation. The Regency of Algiers collapsed in 1830, after the Invasion of Algiers by France.

...My head is not calm, on the contrary the misfortunes of my country worry me continually; in tracing them I have often been obliged to stop my pen and let my tears flow, although my work is a historical account it is written to be read by indulgent and sensitive people.

...The reader should not be surprised at the variety of manners and customs of the different regions which form the Regency of Algiers, such as the country of the Sahara, that of the Tell, and those of the mountains and big cities. If you travel through a part of Switzerland, Italy, Hungary, and Germany, you will also find in these countries a remarkable variety, even in respect to the laws.

Everything that has happened in Algeria for the past three years imposes a sacred duty on me, which is to make known the real state of this country, before and after the [French] invasion, in order to attract the attention of people to the state of this part of the globe; and in order to bring them our knowledge [of our country] and to enlighten them on a few points that they are probably unaware of. Can they show any sympathy for us Algerians, seeing our situation?

— Hamdan ben Othman Khodja, The mirror, 1833

=== Emirate of Abdelkader ===
2 years after the beginning of the French conquest of Algeria, in 1832 local tribes around Mascara, a region which was still independent from the French and in need of a leader after the collapse of the administration of the province of Oran, a governorate of the Regecncy, declared loyalty to Emir Abdelkader ibn Muhieddiene, who in turn declared a Jihad for the liberation of Algeria. Abdelkader fought against the French for 15 years until 1847, and commandeered a coalition composed of Arab, Kabyle, Chenoua and Chaoui tribes with him as the Emir, or Sultan. He wished to establish a modern fully independent nation state in Algeria, and established a modern army, invested into education and the economy of his nation. His emirate stretch from the modern Moroccan-Algerian border in the west to the region of Kabylia and M'Sila in the east. The only region not under the control of Abdelkader was the Constantinois which was controlled by Ahmed Bey ben Mohamed Chérif (who fought a Jihad to restore the Regency of Algiers against the French), before it was taken by the French in 1837.

Do you ignore the fact that our country stretches from Oujda all the way to Tunisia, the Djerid, the Tell, and the Sahara, and that a woman can roam this vast expanse alone without fear of being disturbed by anyone, while your influence extends only over the ground covered by the feet of your soldiers.

— Emir Abdelkader, from a letter sent to general Bugeaud,

== Early 1900s ==
A new generation of Muslims emerged in Algeria at the time of World War I and grew to maturity during the 1920s and 1930s. It consisted of a small but influential class of évolués, other Algerians whose perception of themselves and their country had been shaped by wartime experiences, and a body of religious reformers and teachers. Some of these people were members of the few wealthy Muslim families that had managed to insinuate themselves into the colonial system in the 1890s and had with difficulty succeeded in obtaining for their sons the French education coveted by progressive Algerians. Others were among the about 173,000 Algerians who had served in the French army during World War I or the several hundred thousand more who had assisted the French war effort by working in factories. Many Algerians stayed in France after 1918, and sent the money they earned there to their relatives in Algeria. In France they became aware of a standard of living higher than any they had known at home and of democratic political concepts, taken for granted by Frenchmen in France, which colons, soldiers, and bureaucrats had refused to apply to the Muslim majority in Algeria. Some Algerians also became acquainted with the pan-Arab nationalism growing in the Middle East.

=== Political movements ===
One of the earliest movements for political reform was an integrationist group, the Young Algerians (Jeunese Algérienne). Its members were drawn from the small, liberal elite of well-educated, middle-class évolués who demanded an opportunity to prove that they were French as well as Muslim. In 1908 they delivered to France's Prime Minister Georges Clemenceau a petition that expressed opposition under the status quo to a proposed policy to conscript Muslim Algerians into the French army. If, however, the state granted the Muslims full citizenship, the petition went on, opposition to conscription would be dropped. In 1911, in addition to demanding preferential treatment for "the intellectual elements of the country", the group called for an end to unequal taxation, broadening of the franchise, more schools, and protection of indigenous property. The Young Algerians added a significant voice to the reformist movement against French colonial policy that began in 1892 and continued until the outbreak of World War I. In part to reward Muslims who fought and died for France, Clemenceau appointed reform-minded Charles Jonnart as governor general. Reforms promulgated in 1919 and known as the Jonnart Law expanded the number of Muslims permitted to vote to about 425,000. The legislation also removed all voters from the jurisdiction of the humiliating Code de l'indigénat.

The most popular Muslim leader in Algeria after the war was Khalid ibn Hashim, grandson of Emir Abd al Qadir and a member of the Young Algerians, although he differed with some members of the group over acceptance of the Jonnart Law. Some Young Algerians were willing to work within the framework set out by the reforms, but Emir Khalid, as he was known, continued to press for the complete Young Algerian program. He was able to win electoral victories in Algiers and to enliven political discourse with his calls for reform and full assimilation, but by 1923 he tired of the struggle and left Algeria, eventually retiring to Damascus.

Some of the Young Algerians in 1926 formed the Federation of Elected Natives (Fédération des Élus Indigènes, FEI), as many of the former group's members had joined the circle of Muslims eligible to hold public office. The federation's objectives were the assimilation of the évolués into the French community, with full citizenship but without surrendering their personal status as Muslims, and the eventual integration of Algeria as a full province of France. Other objectives included equal pay for equal work for government employees, abolition of travel restrictions to and from France, abolition of the Code de l'indigénat (which had been reinstituted earlier), and electoral reform.

The first group to call for Algerian independence was the Star of North Africa (Étoile Nord-Africain, known as Star). The group was originally a solidarity group formed in 1926 in Paris to coordinate political activity among North African workers in France and to defend "the material, moral, and social interests of North African Muslims". The leaders included members of the French Communist Party and its labor confederation, and in the early years of the struggle for independence the party provided material and moral support. Ahmed Messali Hadj, the Star's secretary general, enunciated the groups demands in 1927. In addition to independence from France, the Star called for freedom of press and association, a parliament chosen through universal suffrage, confiscation of large estates, and the institution of Arabic schools. The Star was first banned in 1929 and operated underground until 1933 when reconstituted with Messali Hadj President, Imache Amar General Secretary and Belkacem Radjef Treasurer. Its newspaper, El Ouma, reached a circulation of 43,500. Influenced by the Arab nationalist ideas of Lebanese Druze Shakib Arslan, Messali turned away from communist support to a more nationalist outlook, for which the French Communist Party attacked the Star. He returned to Algeria to organize urban workers and peasant farmers and in 1937 founded the Algerian People's Party (Parti du Peuple Algérien, PPA) to mobilize the Algerian working class at home and in France to improve its situation through political action. For Messali Hadj, who ruled the PPA with an iron hand, these aims were inseparable from the struggle for an independent Algeria in which socialist and Islamic values would be fused.

=== Foreign inspiration ===
Algeria's Islamic reform movement took inspiration from Egyptian reformers Muhammad Abduh and Muhammad Rashid Rida and stressed the Arab and Islamic roots of the country. Starting in the 1920s, the reform ulema, religious scholars, promoted a purification of Islam in Algeria and a return to the Qur'an and the sunna, or tradition of the Prophet. The reformers favored the adoption of modern methods of inquiry and rejected the superstitions and folk practices of the countryside, actions that brought them into confrontation with the marabouts. The reformers published their own periodicals and books, and established free modern Islamic schools that stressed Arabic language and culture as an alternative to the schools for Muslims operated for many years by the French. Under the dynamic leadership of Shaykh Abd al Hamid Ben Badis, the reformist ulama organized the Association of Algerian Muslim Ulema (Association des Uléma Musulmans Algériens, AUMA) in 1931. Although their support was concentrated in the Constantine area, the AUMA struck a responsive chord among the Muslim masses, with whom it had closer ties than did the other nationalist organizations. As the Islamic reformers gained popularity and influence, the colonial authorities responded in 1933 by refusing them permission to preach in official mosques. This move and similar ones sparked several years of sporadic religious unrest.

European influences had some impact on indigenous Muslim political movements because Ferhat Abbas and Messali Hadj even with opposite views, essentially looked to France for their more secular ideological models. Ben Badis, however, believed that "Islam is our religion, Arabic our language, Algeria our fatherland." Abbas went as far as summing up the philosophy of the liberal integrationists to oppose the claims of the nationalists by denying in 1936 that Algeria had a separate identity. However, Ben Badis responded that he, too, had looked to the past and found "that this Algerian nation is not France, cannot be France, and does not want to be France ... [but] has its culture, its traditions and its characteristics, good or bad, like every other nation of the earth." He was opposed to French colonial rule.

The colons, for their part, rejected any movement toward reform, whether instigated by integrationist or nationalist organizations. Reaction in Paris to the nationalists was divided. In the 1930s, French liberals saw only the évolués as a possible channel for diffusing political power in Algeria, denigrating Messali Hadj for demagoguery and the AUMA for religious obscurantism. At all times, however, the French government was confronted by the monolithic intransigence of the leaders of the European community in Algeria in opposing any devolution of power to Muslims, even to basically pro-French évolués. The colons also had powerful allies in the French National Assembly, the bureaucracy, the armed forces, and the business community, and were strengthened in their resistance by their almost total control of the Algerian administration and police.

From 1954 to 1962, Algerian nationalists found significant support in Germany, which had a deciding impact on French counterinsurgency efforts during the Algerian war. In that regard, the activities of the FLN outside of France and Algeria was examined. The role of anti-colonial movements underscores the problematic interactions between different security and intelligence services during the Cold War.

=== Viollette Plan ===
The mounting social, political, and economic crises in Algeria for the first time induced older and newly emerged classes of indigenous society to engage from 1933 to 1936 in numerous acts of political protest. The government responded with more restrictive laws governing public order and security. In 1936, French socialist Léon Blum became premier in a Popular Front government and appointed Maurice Viollette his minister of state. The Ulemas and in June 1936 the Star of Messali, sensing a new attitude in Paris that would favor their agenda, cautiously joined forces with the FEI.

Representatives of these groups and members of the Algerian Communist Party (Parti Communiste Algérien, PCA) met in Algiers in 1936 at the first Algerian Muslim Congress. The congress drew up an extensive Charter of Demands, which called for the abolition of laws permitting imposition of the régime d'exception, political integration of Algeria and France, maintenance of personal legal status by Muslims acquiring French citizenship, fusion of European and Muslim education systems in Algeria, freedom to use Arabic in education and the press, equal wages for equal work, land reform, establishment of a single electoral college, and universal suffrage.

Blum and Viollette gave a warm reception to a congress delegation in Paris and indicated that many of their demands could be met. Meanwhile, Viollette drew up for the Blum government a proposal to extend French citizenship with full political equality to certain classes of the Muslim "elite", including university graduates, elected officials, army officers, and professionals. Messali Hadj saw in the Viollette Plan a new "instrument of colonialism ... to split the Algerian people by separating the elite from the masses". The components of the congress—the ulema, the FEI, and communists—were heartened by the proposal and gave it varying measures of support. Mohamed Bendjelloul and Abbas, as spokesmen for the évolués, who would have the most to gain from the measure, considered this plan a major step toward achieving their aims and redoubled their efforts through the liberal FEI to gain broad support for the policy of Algerian integration with France. Not unexpectedly, however, the colons had taken uncompromising exception to the Blum-Viollette proposal. Although the project would have granted immediate French citizenship and voting rights to only about 21,000 Muslims, with provision for adding a few thousand more each year, spokesmen for the colons raised the specter of the European electorate's being submerged by a Muslim majority. Colon administrators and their supporters threw procedural obstacles in the path of the legislation, and the government gave it only lukewarm support, resulting in its ultimate failure.

While the Viollette Plan was still a live issue, however, Messali Hadj made a dramatic comeback to Algeria and had significant local success in attracting people to the Star. A mark of his success was that in 1937 the government dissolved the Star. The same year Messali Hadj formed the PPA, which had a more moderate program, but he and other PPA leaders were arrested following a large demonstration in Algiers. Although Messali Hadj spent many years in jail, his party had the most widespread support of all opposition groups until it was banned in 1939.

Disillusioned by the failure of the Viollette Plan to win acceptance in Paris, Abbas shifted from a position of favoring assimilation of the évolués and full integration with France to calling for the development of a Muslim Algeria in close association with France but retaining "her own physiognomy, her language, her customs, her traditions". His more immediate goal was greater political, social, and economic equality for Muslims with the colons. By 1938 the cooperation among the parties that made up the congress began to break up.

== Polarization and politicization at the time of WWII ==
Algerian Muslims rallied to the French side at the start of World War II as they had done in World War I. Nazi Germany's quick defeat of France, however, and the establishment of the collaborationist Vichy regime, to which the colons were generally sympathetic, not only increased the difficulties of the Muslims but also posed an ominous threat to the Jews in Algeria. The Algerian administration vigorously enforced the anti-Semitic laws imposed by Vichy, which stripped Algerian Jews of their French citizenship. Potential opposition leaders in both the European and the Muslim communities were arrested.

Allied landings were made at Algiers and Oran by 70,000 British and United States troops on November 8, 1942, in coordination with landings in Morocco. As part of Operation Torch under the overall command of General Dwight D. Eisenhower, Algiers and Oran were secured two days later after a determined resistance by French defenders. On November 11, Admiral François Darlan, commander in chief of Vichy French forces, ordered a ceasefire in North Africa. Algeria provided a base for the subsequent Allied campaign in Tunisia.

After the fall of the Vichy regime in Algeria, General Henri Giraud, Free French commander in chief in North Africa, slowly rescinded repressive Vichy laws despite opposition by colon extremists. He also called on the Muslim population to supply troops for the Allied war effort. Ferhat Abbas and twenty-four other Muslim leaders replied that Algerians were ready to fight with the Allies in freeing their homeland but demanded the right to call a conference of Muslim representatives to develop political, economic, and social institutions for the indigenous population "within an essentially French framework". Giraud, who succeeded in raising an army of 250,000 men to fight in the Italian campaign, refused to consider this proposal, explaining that "politics" must wait until the end of the war.

The first large Algerian nationalist protest took place in 1945.

=== The manifesto of the Algerian People ===
In March 1943, Abbas, who had abandoned assimilation as a viable alternative to self-determination, presented the French administration with the Manifesto of the Algerian People, signed by fifty-six Algerian nationalist and international leaders. Outlining the perceived past and present problems of colonial rule, the manifesto demanded specifically an Algerian constitution that would guarantee immediate and effective political participation and legal equality for Muslims. It called for agrarian reform, recognition of Arabic as an official language on equal terms with French, recognition of a full range of civil liberties, and the freeing of political prisoners of all parties.

The French governor general created a commission composed of prominent Muslims and Europeans to study the manifesto. This commission produced a supplementary reform program, which was forwarded to General Charles de Gaulle, leader of the Free French movement. De Gaulle and his newly appointed governor general in Algeria, General Georges Catroux, a recognized liberal, viewed the manifesto as evidence of a need to develop a mutually advantageous relationship between the European and Muslim communities. Catroux was reportedly shocked by the "blinded spirit of social conservatism" of the colons, but he did not regard the manifesto as a satisfactory basis for cooperation because he felt it would submerge the European minority in a Muslim state. Instead, the French administration in 1944 instituted a reform package, based on the 1936 Viollette Plan, that granted full French citizenship to certain categories of "meritorious" Algerian Muslims—military officers and decorated veterans, university graduates, government officials, and members of the Legion of Honor—who numbered about 60,000.

=== Demanding autonomy from France ===
A new factor influencing Muslim reaction to the reintroduction of the Viollette Plan — which by that date even many moderates had rejected as inadequate — was the shift in Abbas's position from support for integration to the demand for an autonomous state federated with France. Abbas gained the support of the AUMA and formed Friends of the Manifesto and Liberty (Amis du Manifeste et de la Liberté, AML) to work for Algerian autonomie with equal rights for both Europeans and Muslims. Within a short time, the AML's newspaper, Égalité, claimed 500,000 subscribers, indicating unprecedented interest in independence. By this time, over 350,000 Algerian Muslims (out of a total Algerian Muslim population of nine million) were working in France to support their relatives in Algeria, and many thousands more worked in towns. Messali and his PPA still rejected anything short of independence.

Social unrest grew in the winter of 1944–45, fueled in part by a poor wheat harvest, shortages of manufactured goods, and severe unemployment. On May Day, the clandestine PPA organized demonstrations in twenty-one towns across the country, with marchers demanding freedom for Messali Hadj and independence for Algeria. Violence erupted in some locations, including Algiers and Oran, leaving many wounded and three dead.

Nationalist leaders were resolving to mark the approaching liberation of Europe with demonstrations calling for their own liberation, and it was clear that a clash with the authorities was imminent. The tensions between the Muslim and colon communities exploded on May 8, 1945, V-E Day, in an outburst of such violence as to make their polarization complete, if not irreparable. Police had told local organizers they could march in Sétif only if they did not display nationalist flags or placards. They ignored the warnings, the march began, and gunfire resulted in which a number of police and demonstrators were killed. Marchers rampaged, leading to the killing of 103 Europeans. Word spread to the countryside, and villagers attacked colon settlements and government buildings.

The army and police responded by conducting a prolonged and systematic ratissage (literally, raking over) of suspected centers of dissidence. In addition, military airplanes and ships attacked Muslim population centers. According to official French figures, 1,500 Muslims died as a result of these countermeasures. Other estimates vary from 6,000 to as high as 45,000 killed.

In the aftermath of the Sétif violence, the AML was outlawed, and 5,460 Muslims, including Abbas and many PPA members, were arrested. Abbas deplored the uprising but charged that its repression had taken Algeria "back to the days of the Crusades". In April 1946, Abbas once again asserted the demands of the manifesto and founded the Democratic Union of the Algerian Manifesto (Union Démocratique du Manifeste Algérien), UDMA Abbas called for a free, secular, and republican Algeria loosely federated with France. Upon his release from five-year house arrest, Messali Hadj returned to Algeria and formed the Movement for the Triumph of Democratic Liberties (Mouvement pour le Triomphe des Libertés Démocratiques, MTLD), which quickly drew supporters from a broad cross-section of society. Committed to unequivocal independence, the MTLD firmly opposed Abbas's proposal for federation. However some ex-PPA members convinced that independence could only be obtained by military means, continued to operate clandestinely and maintain cells in the Aures Mountains and Kabylie while maintaining membership in the MTLD. In 1947, they formed the (Organisation spéciale, OS) operating loosely within the MTLD and led by Hocine Ait Ahmed. Their goal was to conduct terrorist operations since political protest through legal channels had been suppressed by the colonial authorities. Ait Ahmed was later succeeded as chief of the OS by Ahmed Ben Bella, one of the early Algerian nationalist leaders.

The National Assembly approved the government-proposed Organic Statute of Algeria in August 1947. This law called for the creation of an Algerian Assembly with one house representing Europeans and "meritorious" Muslims, and the other representing the remaining more than 8 million Muslims. The statute also replaced mixed communes with elected local councils, abolished military government in the Algerian Sahara, recognized Arabic as an official language with French, and proposed enfranchising Muslim women. Muslim and colon deputies alike abstained or voted against the statute but for diametrically opposed reasons: the Muslims because it fell short of their expectations and the colons because it went too far.

The sweeping victory of Messali Hadj's MTLD in the 1947 municipal elections frightened the colons, whose political leaders, through fraud and intimidation, attempted to obtain a result more favorable to them in the following year's first Algerian Assembly voting. The term élection algérienne became a synonym for rigged election. The MTLD was allowed nine seats, Abbas's UDMA was given eight, and government-approved "independents" were awarded fifty-five seats. These results may have reassured some of the colons that the nationalists had been rejected by the Muslim community, but the elections suggested to many Muslims that a peaceful solution to Algeria's problems was not possible.

At the first session of the colon-controlled Algerian Assembly, an MTLD delegate was arrested at the door, prompting other Muslim representatives to walk out in protest. A request by Abbas to gain the floor was refused. Frustrated by these events, the nationalist parties, joined by the PCA, formed a common political front that undertook to have the results of the election voided. French socialists and moderates tried to initiate a formal inquiry into the reports of vote fraud but were prevented from doing so by the assembly's European delegates, who persuaded the governor general that an investigation would disturb the peace. New elections in 1951 were subject to the same sort of rigging that had characterized the 1948 voting.

In 1952 anti-French demonstrations precipitated by the OS led to Messali Hadj's arrest and deportation to France. Internal divisions and attacks by the authorities severely weakened the MTLD, draining its energies. Colon extremists took every opportunity to persuade the French government of the need for draconian measures against the emergent independence movement.

Ben Bella created a new underground action committee to replace the OS, which had been broken up by the French police in 1950. The new group, the Revolutionary Committee of Unity and Action (Comité Révolutionnaire d'Unité et d'Action, CRUA), was based in Cairo, where Ben Bella had fled in 1952. Known as the chefs historiques (historical chiefs), the group's nine original leaders—Hocine Ait Ahmed, Mohamed Boudiaf, Belkacem Krim, Rabah Bitat, Larbi Ben M'Hidi, Mourad Didouch, Moustafa Ben Boulaid, Mohamed Khider, and Ben Bella—were considered the leaders of the Algerian War of Independence.

== Algerian nationalism and the war of independence ==
=== Political mobilisation ===
Between March and October 1954, the CRUA organised a military network in Algeria comprising six military regions (referred to at the time as wilayat; singular: wilaya). The leaders of these regions and their followers became known as the "internals". Ben Bella, Mohammed Khider, and Hocine Aït Ahmed formed the External Delegation in Cairo. Encouraged by i.e. Egypt's President Gamal Abdul Nasser (r. 1954–71), their role was to gain foreign support for the rebellion and to acquire arms, supplies, and funds for the wilaya commanders. In October, the CRUA renamed itself the National Liberation Front (Front de Libération Nationale, FLN), which assumed responsibility for the political direction of the revolution. The National Liberation Army (Armée de Libération Nationale, ALN), the FLN's military arm, was to conduct the War of Independence within Algeria. FLN and ALN diffused the civil-military relations, and the army remained present throughout the end of the war and beyond, although in the end the victory would in the end be a political one rather than a military one. The FLN resorted to populist rhetoric and used symbolic slogans, such as "one sole hero: the people"; however, they remained somewhat distanced from the population during the war. This was partly a consequence of the inability of a class strong enough to emerge and articulate a credible and overarching consensus about revolutionary resistance strategies under the oppression of the colonial system. The FLN was a complex organisation, entailing much more than what perceived at first glance, they were characterised by an anti-intellectualism and a conviction that the country (and thereby also the abstract masses) had to be liberated by a violent group of dedicated revolutionaries. Simultaneously, their leadership struggled with intra-elite ideological conflicts and throughout history, FLN has simultaneously contained Liberals, Marxists as well as Islamists.

=== Defining the nation ===
The many and versatile events of the war of liberation in Algeria (see Algerian war) between 1954 - 1962, one of the longest and bloodiest decolonisation struggles, have in different ways shaped past and present ideas about the Algerian nation. Both warring parties resorted extensively to violence, and the collective memory of torture during the Algerian War of Independence still lingers heavily on the national identity of Algeria.

The FLN was, after some time, more or less the predominant organisation in the national struggle against France; however, support of the national liberation rested partly on a cornerstone of intimidation, aimed at promoting compliance from the native population. To be seen as a pro-French Muslim—a "béni-oui-oui"—could cause immediate retribution. Spurred by, i.e., internal political turmoil partly caused by an enormous presence of the French army, an effect of a vote in of special powers by the National Assembly, FLN was under severe pressure in the late 50s. The nation was torn between a highly aggressive coloniser and an FLN that claimed to embody the people's struggle. Before, during, and after the Algerian war Algerian nationalism was heavily influenced by Pan-Arabism and Arab nationalism. These ideologies spread from the Middle East, and were promoted by popular foreign Arab nationalist figures like Gamal Abdel Nasser. The FLN, especially after independence, espoused Arabism and began the Arabization process of the country as a way to combat "colonial divides" created by France, which, however, led to the estrangement of Berber areas, and unrest.

=== The dissonant role of the Woman in Algerian nationalism ===
Women played a major role in the Algerian War as physical participants but also as symbolic contestation. The war could, in one way, be seen as a battle to win the hearts and minds of the people, and the body and idea of the Muslim woman was an arena of major confrontation between the French and the FLN. On the one hand, French rule was justified (as in many other conflicts and contexts) by pointing to the Islamic family regulations as problematic and backwards and something that needed to be corrected and governed, an issue that only the "emancipatory power of French values" could solve. Moreover, it was thought that appealing to the Muslim woman was the only way to "win the hearts and minds of the family as a whole". As a response, the (often rural) veiled Muslim woman became a symbol of Algerian resistance, an allegory of purity and the impenetrability of Islam.

However, the FLN's nationalistic discourse on women was constructed similarly to the French one. It was, to some extent, maybe directed to an international audience rather than the (rural) females who were subjects of the propaganda. They made sure to diffuse images of women bearing weapons and participating in the war, and argued that only emancipation from colonial rule would lead to this absolute liberation of women. Abbas once said, inspired by the works of Fanon, that "Women are the symbol of the new society and shall part-take [sic] in shaping new societies." This image of the liberated Algerian woman counteracted racial stereotypes and made it harder for France to justify continued coloniality.

On 30 September 1956, three female FLN members, Zora Drif, Djamila Bouhired, and Samia Lakhdari placed bombs in two cafés in the French settler neighbourhoods as a response to an earlier bomb placed by units of the French police in a Muslim quarter. They had managed to trespass the French checkpoint by simulating "French appearance"—later it has, however, been noted that many women who were part of the urban FLN bomb networks were often students who already dressed in a western fashion, what was disguised was thereby their political engagement rather than their physical identity. The event is said to have sparked the Battle of Algiers (1956–57). Djamila and the political engagement of women in the independence war were depicted in the Egyptian film Jamila, the Algerian (1958)—a movie that managed to mobilise huge support for the Algerian resistance movement throughout the Arab world. Later, the trio also played an important part in the Battle of Algiers, produced in 1966. Popular culture enforced the idealised image of the emancipated Algerian mujahadinat. These three women, together with, for example, the "three Djamilas" (Djamila Bouhired, Djamila Bouazza, and Djamila Boupacha), became important figures to resort to in the construction of the Algerian self.

The treatment and torture of these women and other prisoners taken during the battle of Algiers also played a great role in damaging French legitimacy as a moral authority. Simultaneously, the (partly self-chosen) depoliticization of their actions contributed to a scattered gender order.

=== FLN as the symbol of national liberation ===
The Battle of Algiers (1956–57) was a phase of the war that could be described as militarily won by the French but politically won by FLN. The French strategy, led by Charles de Gaulle and General Maurice Challe, alienated the population and resulted in international condemnation of the brutality of the French method. The first time Algerians' right to self-determination was recognised was in a speech by de Gaulle on 16 September 1959. Whereas French policies changed over time, and in addition were highly fragmented due to the ideological factions between the settler population, the mainland French government, and the Organisation armée secrète, the outspoken political objective of FLN remained national independence. This allowed them to some extent to create an image of unity and common purpose, somehow embodying the people's voice in their official discourse. Even though they failed to articulate broad-based national goals and strategies to achieve them, they remained a symbol of national liberation, something that, to this day, might be what has contributed largely to their legitimacy.

== Evolution of Algerian nationalism after independence ==
In 1963, the nationality law defined Algerianness on the basis of ethno-cultural terms, which meant that on paper, someone's participation in the war of independence was the signifier of their nationality. This meant, amongst many things, that even Europeans who had fought on the Algerian side in the war could earn the right to become Algerians.

=== Algeria – Mecca of the revolutionaries ===
In 1962, Ben Bella was named president of the independent Algeria after a turbulent couple of months, and drawing upon a largely mythical and invented past, tried to ambitiously govern the post-colonial reality. The relationship between leaders and ordinary people was, in the first years of independence, a seemingly egalitarian one, building upon the social levelling present in Algerian nationalism even since Messali Hadj. Ben Bella contributed to the mapping of Algeria as a model country in the fight against colonial and imperial rule, and the portrayal of Algeria as a new form of socialist society. After independence, Algeria's borders were opened to "brothers in arms" from contemporary liberation movements in Namibia, Rhodesia, Brittany, Congo, and Mozambique. Most prominent, maybe the refuge offered to Nelson Mandela and the ANC movement in South Africa. His travels to Cuba, where he met with both Fidel Castro and Che Guevara to discuss the communist revolutions, further amplified the socialist affiliation of the government was an essential signifier of the nature of the Algerian self. The inspiration as well as support that was offered by multiple Eastern European countries, as well as diplomatic relations with Russia, China, a number of countries in North Africa and the Middle East, and even the United States, also emphasised that Algeria was no longer going to be dependent on one single imperial State. Algeria and more specifically Algiers became the incarnation of pan-Arabism and pan-Africanism, a central point, and was transformed into a "Mecca of the revolutionaries".

The epitome of the socialist and revolutionary Algerian nation-building project was the PANAF (Festival panafricain d'Alger), the first pan-African cultural festival of enormous size, which took place in 1969. Under the leadership of Boumediene, the city continued to play its role as a capital of liberation movements. The festival was an important event in the continued construction of the national identity and partly contributed to restoring some of its appeal to the youths of Algeria. The festival became a huge two-day carnival where performances, expositions, and intellectual conferences merged. It hosted important figures from the entire African continent as well as from the African diaspora, such as Miriam Makeba, Archie Shepp, Nina Simone, Maya Angelou, members from the Black Panthers, and members from Patrice Lumumba's Congolese independence movement. In many ways, the first PANAF was a subversive and temporary space which had never been seen before and might never occur again. During a grand synopsium, Boumediene addressed three main questions that to a large extent shaped the discourse surrounding the festival and pointed to the role of culture in the construction of national as well as panafricain identities. Firstly, the reality of the African culture, secondly, the role of African culture in national liberation struggles and in the consolidation of an African unity, and thirdly, the role of African culture in the future social development of Africa. The nationalist project of Boumediène was articulated as a dual one, in the sense that it aimed to go back to traditional values and norms, progress, and develop in the modern world of science and technology.

=== Diverse 1970s and 80s ===
During the 1970s and 80s, much happened in Algerian society. Early on, Boumedienne made efforts to strengthen the national image, emphasized independence from the outside world, and nationalized oil and gas. Even though the idea of a collective independence remained present, multiple identities increasingly competed to patent what it was to be Algerian. The cultural battle between French, Berber, and Arabic boomed - and the political elite favoured Arabisation at the expense of, for example, Berber culture and what could be deemed as Western. One of the consequences of arabisation was the introduction of the Algerian Family Code, a law informed by a reading of Islamic law which highly compromised the rights of women. The "liberation" some women had experienced during the war of independence was step by step halted or withdrawn. The mujahedinat past of some women could, however, still legitimise some activists' campaigns on women's rights issues in the 1980s and after, since their proven belonging to the nation could (at least partly) provide proof that their ideas were not simply a consequence of westernisation.

=== "Black Decade" and the tearing apart of the collective Algerian self ===
In the shift from 1980 to 1990, the political culture in Algeria was steaming. Internationally, the communist Eastern Bloc had just fallen, and Islamism was on the rise. Meanwhile, the country was ongoing democratisation and was planning its first multi-party election, which the FIS (Islamic Salvation Front) seemed to win. In this context, polarisation bloomed, the political climate toughened, and materialised in violence, making it increasingly complex to debate differences verbally. The situation culminated in the Algerian civil war between multiple Islamist groups and the military, who had taken control over the government when the FLN seemed to face defeat. Once again the Algerian society experienced extensive and ruthless violence, which culminated in the late 1990s. In essence, the Algerian entre-soi was torn apart. In 1999, Abdelaziz Bouteflika, a member of the FLN, was elected president, and a number of amnesty laws allowed many former Islamists to lay down arms, simultaneously launching extensive counter-terrorist attacks, which forced a large number of insurgents out of the country. The violence continued but slowly changed form, and by 2006, the only Islamist splinter group that was still in place, GSPC, joined Al-Qaeda and internationalised their goal. Having before stated that they wanted to "build an Islamic state with sharia law in Algeria", they later proclaimed that they had moved ideologically towards Al-Qaeda's global jihad and aspired to establish an Islamic state in the entire Maghreb.

=== Young generation and the fall of Bouteflika ===
The current anti-Bouteflika demonstrations in Algeria (Manifestations de 2019 en Algérie or 2019 Algerian protests) were, especially in the beginning, extremely careful not to be identified with the Islamist civil war of the 1990s or with the Arab Spring of early 2010. The protests have been enormous and reoccurred every Friday, but remained peaceful for a long time. Later protests have seen increased presence of the military, which has a long history of intervening in Algerian politics.

Some important symbols stemming from earlier times of Algerian history have, however, appeared later in the movement. For example, the slogan "one sole hero, the people" is once again visible on the streets. The movement has also referred to the independence in 62 as the "liberation of the state", thus pointing to the current manifestations as a way to obtain "liberation of the people". Moreover, partly as a consequence of one of the earlier Fridays of demonstrations coinciding with the International Women's Day, women very quickly took part in the demonstrations as well.

=== Berber identity ===
==== Before independence ====
The Algerian nationalist movement in its early manifestations was influenced and formed mainly by the rising tide of Arab nationalism in the region. Starting in the 1940s alternative strains of national sentiment began to form in intellectual circles among mainly Kabyle proponents of the Algerian national movement (such as Ali Yahia Abdennour, and Hocine Aït Ahmed) arguing for a so-called "Algerian Algeria", a form of nationalism that specifically distinguishes the country from other Arab nations, and espousing a pluralist view on the Algerian national identity. This movement was explicitly an Algerian nationalist one, and proclaimed that the Arab-Islamic model of Algerian nationalism defied the complexity of Algeria as a nation, and demanded a more inclusive conception of Algerian nationalism. This was however was opposed to by other more conservative factions of the national movement. This culminated in a schism in 1949 within the MTLD known as the "Berberist crisis", prompting leaders such as Ali Yahia Abdennour to leave the party, while others were purged or relegated in significance. The dominant line within the party viewed this sentiment as a threat to national unity within the fledgling national movement. While this split did give rise to the Berberist movement, contemporary lines and strains differ significantly from the original form of the movement espousing a unique form of Algerian nationalism, and nowadays often takes shape in anti-Arab racism or in some cases even separatism and are separate from its original form. Over the next years, the nature of Algerian nationalism and various ideas of it continued to be a hot topic of debate within the nationalist movement between both Arab and Berber nationalists, and while the party line officially adopted the definition of Algeria as an Arab-Islamic nation, this was continuously contested by proponents who espoused alternative views. In spite of the conflict, Berbers ultimately ended up being at the forefront of the Algerian national movement during the ensuing Algerian war.

==== Post-independence ====
The 1st November 1954 was a turning point in determining her future and a tremendous crowning of a ferocious resistance during which she withstood the diverse onslaughts on her culture and values, as well as the fundamental constituents of her identity, namely Islam, Arabism and Amazighism that the State has been relentlessly endeavouring to promote and develop each one of them; the roots of her current exertion in the various domains stretch back to the glorious past of her Nation.

— Algerian constitution, 2020, Preamble

After a brief power struggle in 1962, Ahmed Ben Bella, an avowed Arab nationalist, consolidated power within the newly founded Algerian state. Following the takeover, the FLN's new leadership began a purge of hostile leaders. The 1963 Algerian constitution drafted shortly after that explicitly declared Algeria to be an Arab-Islamic state, and opposition to this model of Algerian national identity was delegitimized as regionalism or even separatism. Opponents to the FLN sought and promoted an alternative form of Algerian nationalism. In 1963, in opposition to Ben Bella's consolidation of power into a one-party state, the Socialist Forces Front began a small-scale insurgency in the Kabylia region led by Hocine Ait Ahmed, which was eventually suppressed. The Arabic language was the sole educational language as part of a massive push for Arabization, and Berber identity was in general recast as a threat to national unity within the state. Under the era of Houari Boumédiène's leadership from 1965 to 1978, the issue of nationalism and national identity was increasingly centralized within the Algerian state, and cultural plurality was seen as destabilizing. In spite of this, Berber identity and he idea of an Algerian Algeria continued to be a suppressed, but persistent narrative of the nation. Alternative narratives and promotion of Berber identity was seen by the government as running counter to their established definition of Algerian nationalism, and authors such as Mouloud Mammeri were criticized as such. Berberist views on the Algerian national identity began developing as somewhat of a counter-discourse, seeking to challenge the currently established definition of Algerian nationhood, and instead promote a version of nationhood pluralistic in nature and inclusive of Berber identity. Tension between the government and Berber population, especially Kabyles mounted over the years since independence, the National Charter of 1976 did not take into account Berber demands in spite of protests, and a convergence of state repression, university bodies of Berber students, and the Berber Academy eventually resulted in massive riots mostly by Berber students and violent repression in 1980 known as the Berber Spring. The violent repression by the state authorities resulted in 123 death and thousands of injuries. While the movement was violently repressed it was the first sign of active resistance against the Algerian state's narrative since 1963, and many later important Berber politicians made their names during the protests. In 1989, the Algerian government in effect ended its general policy of Arabization. Civil strikes and protests continued in the 1990s, and violent riots broke out in 2001 over the murder of a student named Massinissa Guermah by the police. The events known as the Black Spring resulted in over 128 deaths, but for the first time in Algerian history, constitutional amendments were made recognizing Tamazight as Algeria's national language in 2002. Finally, in 2016, a constitutional amendment recognized Tamazight alongside Arabic as an official language of Algeria, and the constitution's preamble stated that Amazighity or Amazighism is a central component and influence of Algeria's national identity.

== Algerianism ==
The term Algerianism has had two meanings in history: one during the French colonial era and another after the independence of Algeria.

During the French era, algérianisme was a literary genre with political overtones, born among French Algerian writers (see Algerian literature) who hoped for a common Algerian future culture, uniting French settlers and native Algerians. The term algérianiste was used for the first time in a 1911 novel by Robert Randau, "Les Algérianistes". A Cercle algérianiste was created in France in 1973 by Pieds-Noirs, with several local chapters. It has for "purpose to safeguard the cultural heritage born from the French presence in Algeria."

In Algerian contemporary politics, "Algerianist" is a political label given to Algerian nationalists whose policies focus more on the unity of Algeria's nation-state beyond regional idiosyncrasies.

The modern Arabic language has two distinct words which can be translated into English as nationalism: qawmiyya قومية, derived from the word qawm (meaning "tribe, ethnic nationality"), and wataniyya وطنية, derived from the word watan (meaning "homeland, native country"). The word qawmiyya has been used to refer to pan-Arab nationalism, while wataniyya has been used to refer to patriotism at a more local level (sometimes disparaged as "regionalism" by those who consider pan-Arabism the only true form of Arab nationalism). Algerianism is the Algerian patriotism, against pan-Arabist nationalism and different forms of regionalisms.
