= 1934 Constantine riots =

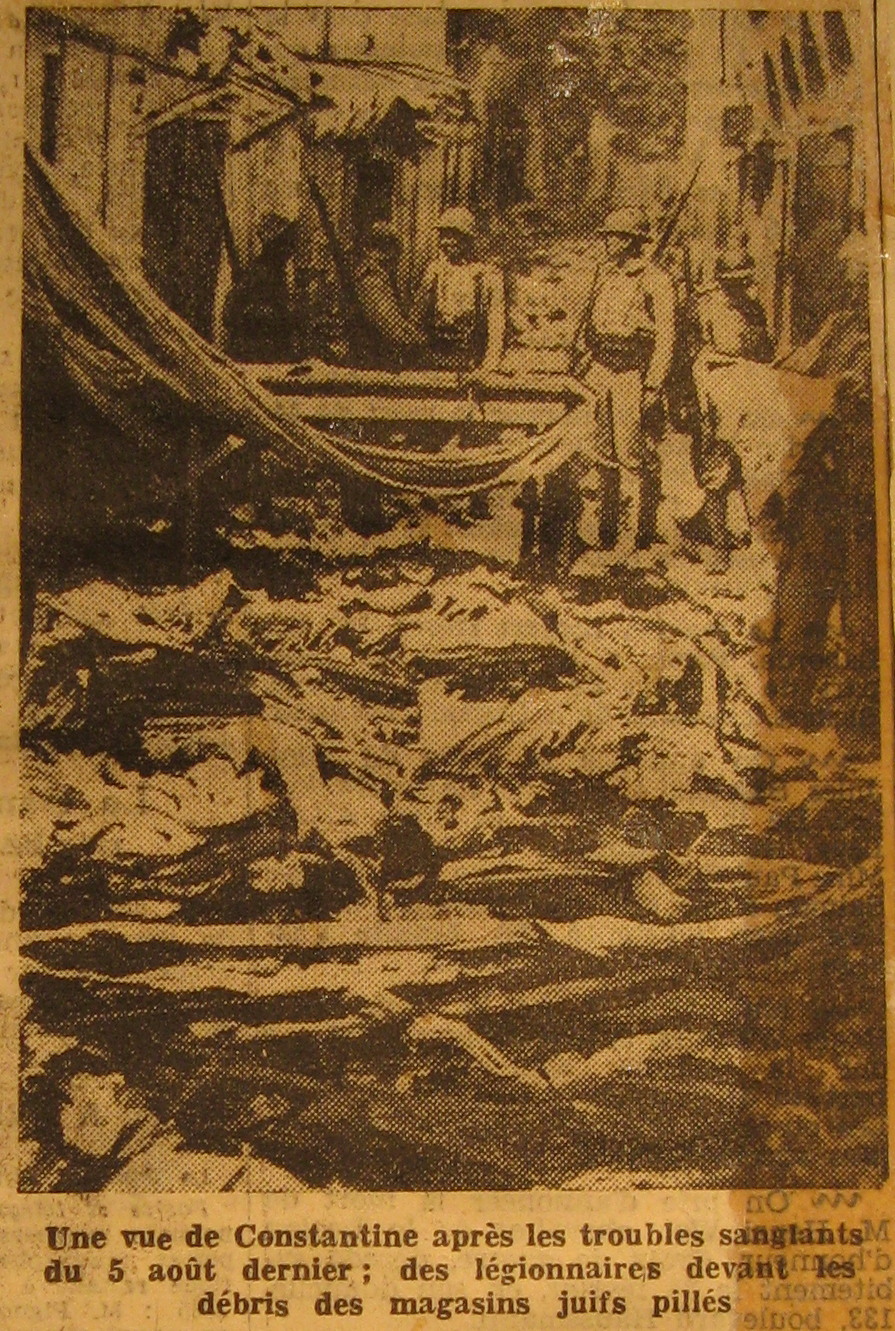
- Location: Constantine, French Algeria
- Date: August 3–5, 1934
- Target: Algerian Jews
- Deaths: 25 Jews, 3 Muslims
- Injuries: Roughly 200

The 1934 Constantine riots were an incident of antisemitic violence in the Algerian city of Constantine, targeting the local Jewish population. A mob of around 300 local Algerians attacked the Jewish quarter and targeted Jewish businesses and homes over a period of several hours, with the violence spreading to nearby towns. The French colonial authorities did little to rein in the violence.

It is uncertain what the exact cause of the riots was, but various accounts suggest that the riots were triggered by an altercation between a Jewish man and some Muslims at the Sidi Lakhdar Mosque in Constantine. Multiple sources report that 25 Jews and 3 Muslims died over the course of the three-day riot, and several Jewish establishments were pillaged. The events have been described as a pogrom.

== Background ==
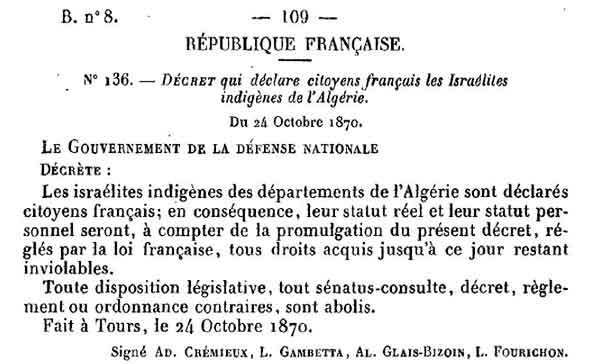
The Crémieux Decree, which granted French citizenship to Algerian Jews

The 1934 Constantine riots can be contextualized by the rising antisemitism in French Algeria. One source of the tension was the Crémieux Decree, which was implemented in October 1870 and gave Algerian Jews French citizenship. For the French government, the decree was considered part of the so-called "civilizing mission" in North Africa.

Various French parties and individuals were against the decision, and many of the reasons were rooted in antisemitism or xenophobia more generally. One of the reasons for the French to oppose the decree was that they believed that the Jews were more suitable for commercial jobs, and they were afraid that French citizenship would allow more Jews into the French military. Many right-wing, radical French nationalists agreed with Charles du Bouzet's claim that the Algerian Jews were simply incompatible with Western civilization. Du Bouzet, the former prefect of Oran and special commissioner to Algeria, noted that it was the Algerian Jews' "morals, language and clothing" that made them Arab, hence different from the French. The radical French nationalists saw the gradual political inclusion and assimilation of the Algerian Jews into the French community as a threat to the "native" French society.

There were spikes in antisemitism in Algeria in the early 20th century. For instance, Dr Jules Molle, who spearheaded the antisemitic Unions latines movement, became the mayor of Oran in 1925 and became the city's deputy in 1928. Abbé Gabriel Lambert, who claimed that the political left promoted "Jewish imperialism", became Oran's mayor in 1934. Local newspapers in both Oran and Constantine, Le Petit Oranais and La Tribune, respectively, regularly propagated antisemitic messages.

Evidence suggests that the antisemitic French settler population attempted to instill antisemitic sentiments in the Muslim Algerian population and induce altercations between Constantine's Muslims and Jews. Based on contemporary press and police reports, there is no evidence that antisemitic messages were publicly propagated by the local Muslim politicians or clerics in the 1920s and 1930s. There was also a wide belief that Nazis had instigated the riot.

== Timeline ==
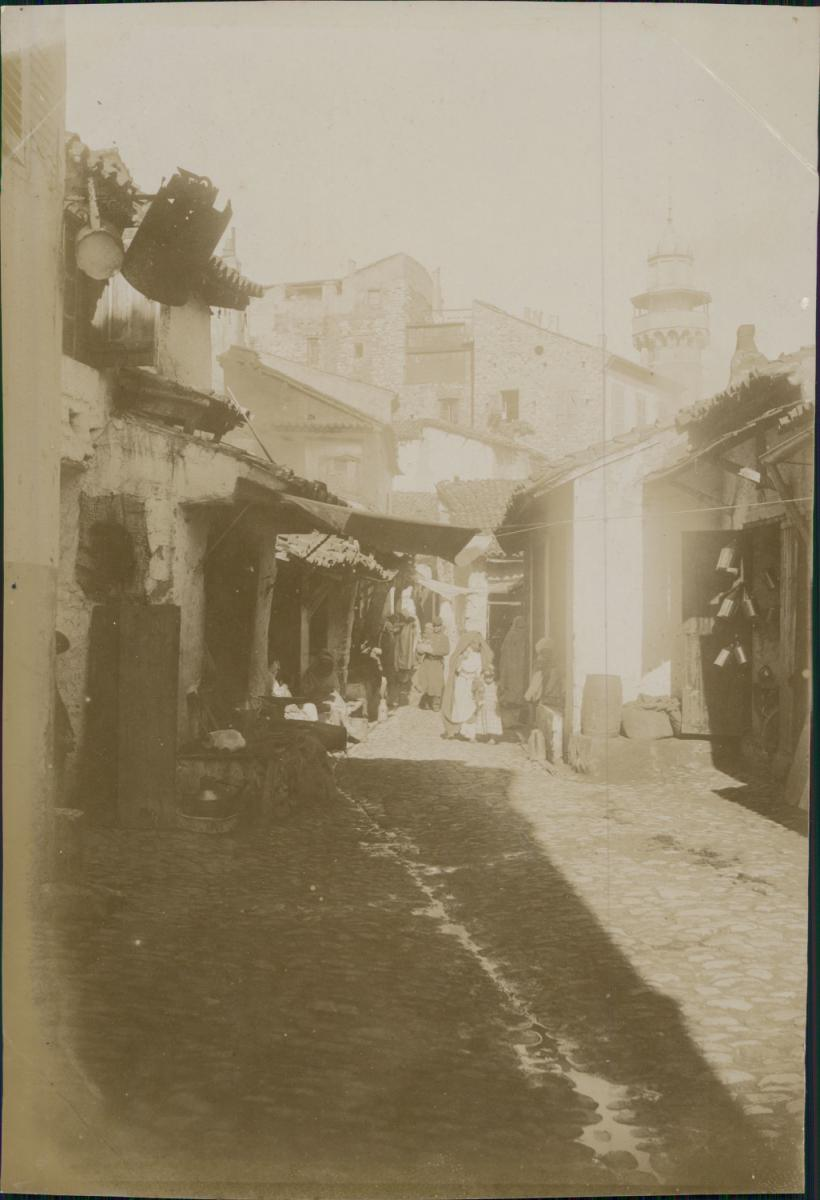
The Sidi Lakhdar Mosque in Constantine, 1900

The cause of the Constantine pogrom has been debated for some time. The general consensus is that the initial cause of the conflict was what Georges Bensoussan calls a "minor confrontation" between Eliahou Khalifa, a Jewish Zouave, and Muslim worshippers at the Sidi Lakhdar Mosque on August 3, 1934. The Muslims said that Khalifa was drunk and insulted Islam. A report by the Jewish authorities claimed he was not intoxicated, and that after getting into an argument with them, the Muslims had cursed Khalifa's faith and he cursed them and their faith back. The French colonial authorities only reported the Muslim version of events, which most scholars believe instigated the pogrom. Other accounts explain that Khalifa had urinated outside on the mosque's wall, which would have instigated the riots. In the evening of August 3rd, a Muslim man was shot in the stomach during the violent demonstrations that ensued at Khalifa's apartment. A total of 148 French soldiers and 52 police agents were sent to contain the riots in the city.

On 4 August, the riots continued as local leaders and representatives of the Muslim and Jewish communities gathered with police and military representatives to seek a peaceful end to the violence.

On 5 August, violence broke out again after rumours of an assassination on a local Muslim politician, Mohamed Salah Bendjelloul, spread. However, the rumours turned out to be false. The riots lasted several hours and also spread to towns in the vicinity of Constantine. The Constantine division of the International League Against Racism and Anti-Semitism (LICRA) hung up posters, both in Arabic and French, calling for peace and an end to the violence.

The riots resulted in the death of 25 Jews and 3 Muslims, roughly 200 people were injured and several Jewish businesses and homes were also destroyed or looted.

== Contemporary reporting ==
JTA reported on August 8, 1934:

A scene of utter desolation and horror, of Jewish girls with their breasts cut off, of little children with numerous knife wounds and of whole families locked in their homes and burned to death, was described by a Jewish Telegraphic Agency correspondent, who succeeded in reaching this city today.

"It will take days before the world will obtain a true picture of all the atrocities committed by the Arabs during the pogrom on the Jewish quarter", the correspondent wired.

"The only comparison I can think of is the Palestine riots of 1929. I found Jewish girls with their breasts cut off, greybearded Jews stabbed to death, little Jewish children dead of numerous knife wounds and whole families locked in their homes and burned to death by the rioters".

"Just as in Palestine in 1929, the lists of the dead and injured run into the hundreds with no official estimates available. The hospitals are filled with Jewish victims and the doors of the hospitals are besieged with half-crazed wives and mothers seeking to ascertain whether their loved ones are among the dead or injured, or whether they succeeded in escaping the pogrom bands".

== See also ==
- 1934 Thrace pogroms
- History of the Jews in Algeria
- Antisemitism in France
- Antisemitism in the Arab world
