= Omar Derdour =

Algerian nationalist (1913 – 2009)

Abou El Kacem Omar Derdour
- أبو القاسم عمر دردور
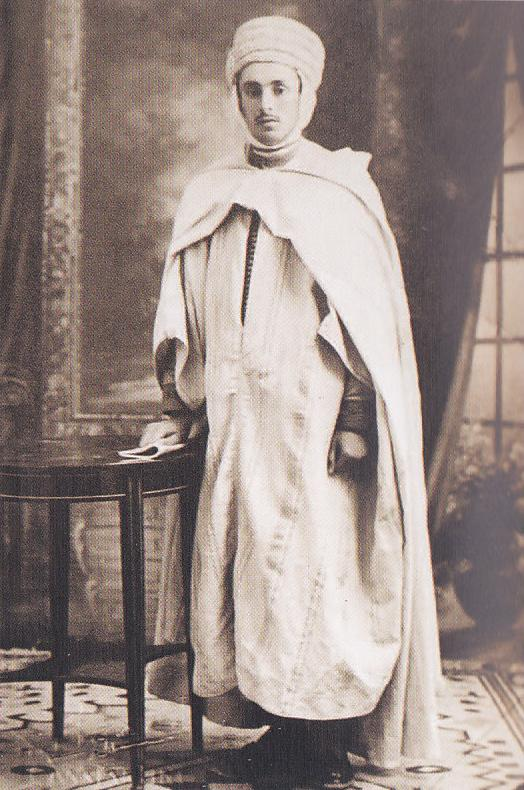
- Omar Derdour in 1936
- Born: 13 October 1913; Hidous, Teniet El Abed, Algeria
- Died: 19 March 2009 (aged 95)
- Occupation: Religious leader
- Known for: Nationalism

Omar Derdour (Arabic: عمر دردور), full name Abou El Kacem Omar Derdour (13 October 1913 – 19 March 2009), was an Algerian Muslim leader, nationalist, and political worker.

A disciple of Abdelhamid Ben Badis, he was active in the Islamic reformation of Algeria and the Algerian War of Independence. He directed the Friends of the Manifesto and Liberty Party's (in French: Amis du Manifeste et de la Liberté, AML) Federation in Constantine, and was a member of the Central Committee and Deputy of the Constantine region from 1947 to 1951.

In 1954, Omar Derdour became a political worker within the National Liberation Front (FLN) and undertook a great deal of propaganda and mobilization in France in 1955 and 1956 and then in Cairo, Egypt and throughout the Arab world. After independence, Omar Derdour devoted himself to teaching, became a founding member of the Islamic Institute, and founded numerous other Muslim institutions and schools.

== Early years ==
Derdour was born on 13 October 1913 in Hidoussa, a small village in the municipality of Teniet El Abed, in the heart of the Aurès Mountains. He was born into a family of scholars which hailed from the Ouled Abdi Valley in that mountain region. He learned the Quran in his great-grandfather's zawiya (a Maghrebi Islamic school). Derdour went to Tolga where he studied at the school of Sheikh Ali bin Omar for two years, and was given a thorough Islamic education in language and jurisprudence.

In 1932 Sheikh Abdul Hafiz al-Hashemi took Omar Derdour to Constantine and introduced him to Sheikh Imam Abdelhamid Ben Badis, who agreed to accept him as a pupil on the condition that he passed an examination. In 1933 Derdour joined the "Green Mosque" (Djamâa El Akhdar) and began studying under Sheikh Abdelhamid Ben Badis. He would remain there for seven years. In 1934, Ben Badis appointed Derdour teacher in the two mosques of Sidi Guemouche and Sidi Boumaâza in Constantine. In 1936, he became the close assistant of Ben Badis in organizing the courses.

== Return to Hidoussa ==
In 1936 Omar Derdour and a group of fellow students founded a division of the Algerian Muslim Scholars Association and became active in education in the fields of religious and national awareness. In 1937, Derdour returned to his village to establish a madrasa for the education of children and adults. Ben Badis considered him the "soul of the Islahiste (Note: The Islahiste movement was a reform movement, which among other things gave women a greater role in religious matters.) movement in the Aures". At the end of 1937, the French authorities became aware of his activities and imprisoned him in Batna for "inciting the population to civil disobedience". Derdour was released on 6 January 1938, but was imprisoned a second time in August 1939 to complete his four-month sentence and was fined 8,000 francs. He was released in September 1939 upon the outbreak of World War II (1939-1945). During the war the authorities suppressed all political activities, and he was forced to limit himself to non-political education.

== Struggle for independence ==
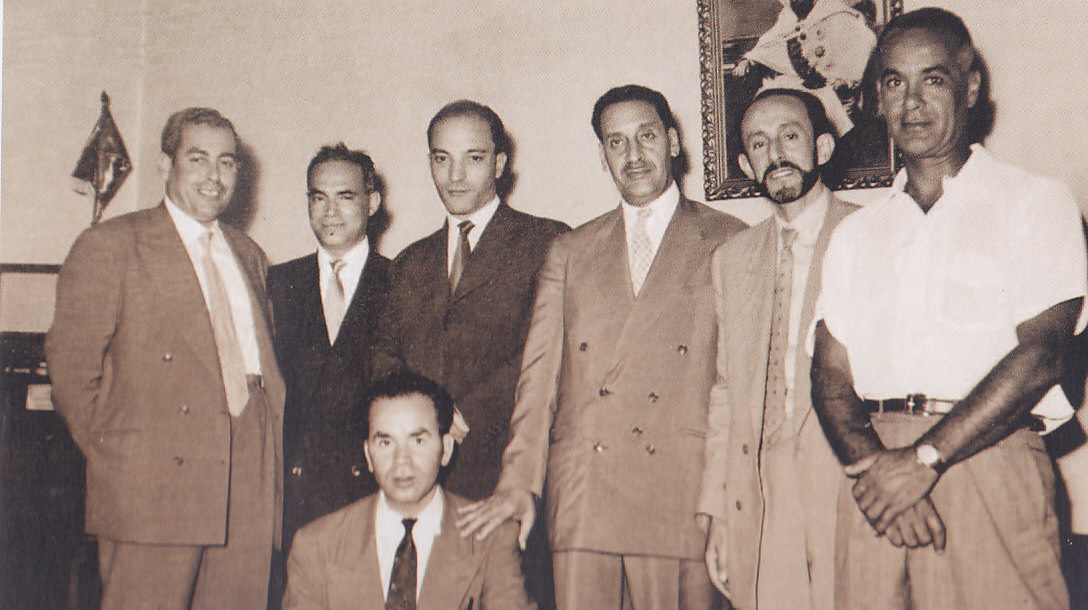
Derdour, second from the right

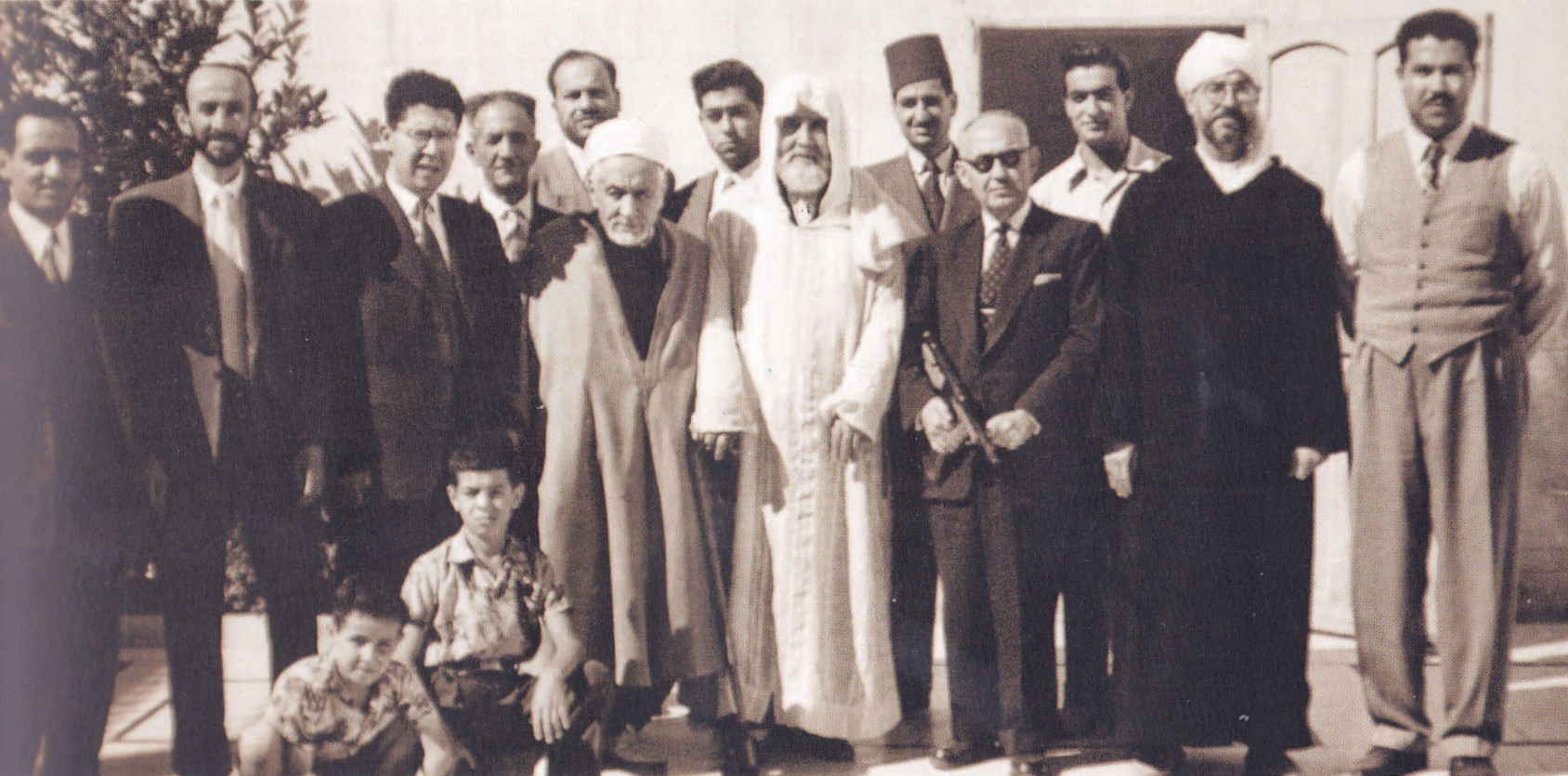
Derdour, second from the left

Omar Derdour directed the AML Party's Federation in Constantine, and was a member of the Central Committee and Deputy of the Constantine region from 1947 until 1951. The purpose of the AML party was to publicize and defend the Manifest du Peuple Algerien; anti-French, it demanded equal rights for the Muslim population and an autonomous Algeria federated with France, the colonial power. Between July 1955 and January 1956 he lived in Vichy, France, working with the National Liberation Front (FLN) on defining the objectives and approach of the revolution. Derdour moved to Cairo, meeting Sheikh Mohammed Bashir Brahimi and other members of the Revolutionary Command. He was given the task of travelling to the Arab countries to raise support for the Algerian revolution. Derdour was based in Cairo until he moved to Tunisia in 1960. He taught soldiers on the Algerian border until independence was achieved in 1962.

== Independent Algeria ==
After Algeria gained independence, Omar Derdour devoted himself to teaching Islam and Arabic. He founded the first Islamic institute in Batna in May 1963, followed by the creation of similar institutions in several cities across the country, reaching 10,000 students. In 1981, Derdour was appointed director of the institute in Sidi Okba for training imams and regional inspectors of religious affairs in Batna, Khenchela and Oum El Bouaghi, holding this position until his retirement. In 1986, Derdour was appointed regional inspector of Religious Affairs in Batna and Khenchela provinces. In the 2000s he built a mosque and a zawiya in the locality of El Hamza in the municipality of Oued Taga and a school in the village of his birth.

On 19 March 2009 Abou El Kacem Omar Derdour died after a long battle against the effects of a stroke. He was buried in Tazoult.

== Bibliography ==
- Barrak, Anissa; Muller, Benedicte (1996). Femmes et Guerres (in French). Editions L'Harmattan. ISBN 978-2-7384-4181-2.
- Bennett, Clinton (15 May 2005). Muslims and Modernity: Current Debates. Continuum International Publishing Group. ISBN 978-0-8264-5482-9.
- Bouseloua, Nadia; Guerfi, Azeddine; Mokhtari, Rachid; Thiriez, Philippe (2011). Aurès, Vivre La Terre Chaouie (in French). Alger: Chihab Éditions. ISBN 978-9961-63-839-2.
- Derradji, Abder-Rahmane (2002). A Concise History of Political Violence in Algeria, 1954–2000: brothers in faith, enemies in arms. E. Mellen Press. p. 577. ISBN 978-0-7734-7049-1.
- Ghrib, Habiba (16 June 2009). "Hommage au cheikh Omar Derdour". Le Jour d'Algérie (in French). Archived from the original on 15 January 2012.
- "Le parcours de Cheikh Omar Derdour étudié". Le Maghreb (in French). Le Maghreb. 17 June 2009.
- "Obituary - Sheikh Omar" (in Arabic). Association of Algerian Muslim Scholars. April 23, 2009. Archived from the original on March 3, 2016.
- "Sheikh Sidi Abu al-Qasim Omar". Aurès forum (in Arabic). 9 October 2010.

=== Further reading ===
- (in Arabic) Ahmad Tawfiq Madani, Ḥayāt kifāḥ: mudhakkirāt, Volume 1, al-Sharikah al-Waṭanīyah lil-Nashr wa-al-Tawzīʻ, 1976.
