= Larbi Tbessi =

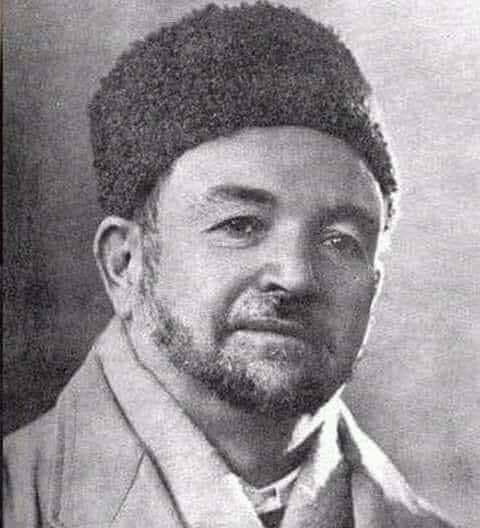
- Revolutionary and reformist Algerian

President of the Association of Algerian Muslim Ulema
- In office 1931–1957

Larbi Tbessi, whose real name was Larbi Ferhati, born in 1891 in Cheria Tébessa Province, was a revolutionary and reformist Algerian, president of the Association of Algerian Muslim Ulema. He disappeared on April 4, 1957, during the war of Algeria, following his arrest at his Algiers home by civilian disguised paratroopers, the French military are still denying arresting or detaining him.

== Biography ==
He spent his early life at Nefta in Tunisia, then he studied in al-Azhar University in Egypt, and University of Ez-Zitouna in Tunisia. Subsequently, he participated actively in the Association of Algerian Muslim Ulema and was President of the Association after his return to Algeria.

Larbi Tebessi was arrested in 1943 and then released. Then he was imprisoned in 1945 after the Sétif and Guelma massacre on May 8, 1945. Larbi Tebessi managed to create a school and he spread his anti-colonial ideas.

Sheikh Larbi Tebessi represented the main current of the ulema association who rallied the principles of the National Liberation Front in 1956. This was instigated by Zighoud Youcef head of the department of Constantinois and founding member of the FLN and after insurgency of August 20, 1955.

Sheikh Larbi Tebessi was killed in 1957 by a commando of the French Army. His body was burned in hot oil and his remains have yet to be returned to the Algerian people. Similar to many Algerian revolutionaries whose remains are kept in museums throughout France, a wicked practice in postcolonial France .

== Legacy ==
- Tébessa University bears his name.
- Larbi Tbessi prize is awarded to the best researchers in Algeria.
- Seminars are organized by the Ministry of Culture and the one of War Veterans in Algeria to celebrate the memory of Larbi Tbessi each year.

== See also ==
- Ben Badis
