= 1948 Algerian Assembly election =

- 4 and 11 April 1948
- All 120 seats in the Algerian Assembly; 61 seats needed for a majority
Party	Seats
Algerian Union–Rally of the French People	40
Movement for the Triumph of Democratic Liberties	9
Democratic Union of the Algerian Manifesto	8
French Section of the Workers' International	4
Radical Party	2
Algerian Communist Party	1
Independent Radicals	4
Independent Federalists	1
Independent Socialists	1
Independents	50
This lists parties that won seats. See the complete results below.

Elections for a new Assembly were held in French colonial Algeria on 4 and 11 April 1948. The new 120-seat Assembly was to be elected by two colleges, each of which would vote for 60 seats; one college represented around 1,500,000 Europeans and Algerian Jews, plus a few thousand "évolué" Muslims, and the second of around 8,000,000 "indigenous" Muslims. The Assembly elections were manipulated by the authorities to ensure a favourable result. Following the victory of the Movement for the Triumph of Democratic Liberties (MTLD) in the 1947 local elections, and with the MTLD and fellow nationalist UDMA set to win a majority in the Second College in the second round of voting, the authorities openly rigged the results in more than two-thirds of seats to ensure the victory of pro-government independents.

The rigging was so brazen that the phrase "élection algérienne" became synonymous with rigged elections.

== Conduct ==
Marcel-Edmond Naegelen, a leading member of the French Section of the Workers' International (SFIO) and Minister of Education in the French government, had been appointed by the government as Governor-General of Algeria on 11 February 1948. Naegelen was the son of an Alsatian who had chosen to move to France after Germany's annexation of Alsace in 1870, and he was strongly against the Alsatian autonomists ("separatists"), and developed the same hostility towards the Algerian "separatists".

Together with the French authorities, he organised the rigging of the elections and the sabotage of the new (1947) status of Algeria, strongly opposed by the allies of the SFIO in the French government coalition, who threatened to withdraw their support. Among them was the leader of the "French Algeria" lobby, the deputy of Constantine René Mayer.

Candidates were arrested before the elections, ballot boxes were stuffed by the colonial administration and the voting in the villages (douars) took place without polling booths under the surveillance of the army. Algerian nationalists triumphed in the first round of the elections, but performed significantly worse in the second as a result of the rigging.

== Results ==
As a result of the rigging, of the 60 Second College seats, the MTLD won only nine, including Messali Hadj, Larbi Demaghlatrous (future ambassador of independent Algeria to Indonesia and Yugoslavia), Chawki Mostefaï and Djilani Embarek, whilst the UDMA won eight, including Ferhat Abbas, whilst 43 went to independents, often labelled as béni-oui-oui. Among the 60 First College seats, there were four socialists, one communist and 55 right-wingers.

Party	First College			Second College			Total seats
Party	Votes	%	Seats	Votes	%	Seats	Total seats
Algerian Union–Rally of the French People			40			0	40
Movement for the Triumph of Democratic Liberties			0			9	9
Democratic Union of the Algerian Manifesto			0			8	8
French Section of the Workers' International			4			0	4
Algerian Communist Party			1			0	1
Radical Party			2			0	2
Independent Radicals			4			0	4
Independent Federalists			0			1	1
Independent Socialists			0			1	1
Independents			9			41	50
Total			60			60	120
Source: Documents algériens. Série politique

== Aftermath ==
After the elections, Ferhat Abbas has been reported to have told Maréchal Juin «Il n'y a plus d'autre solution que les mitraillettes.» ("There is no other solution left than the submachine guns").
