= Mohamed El-Ghassiri =

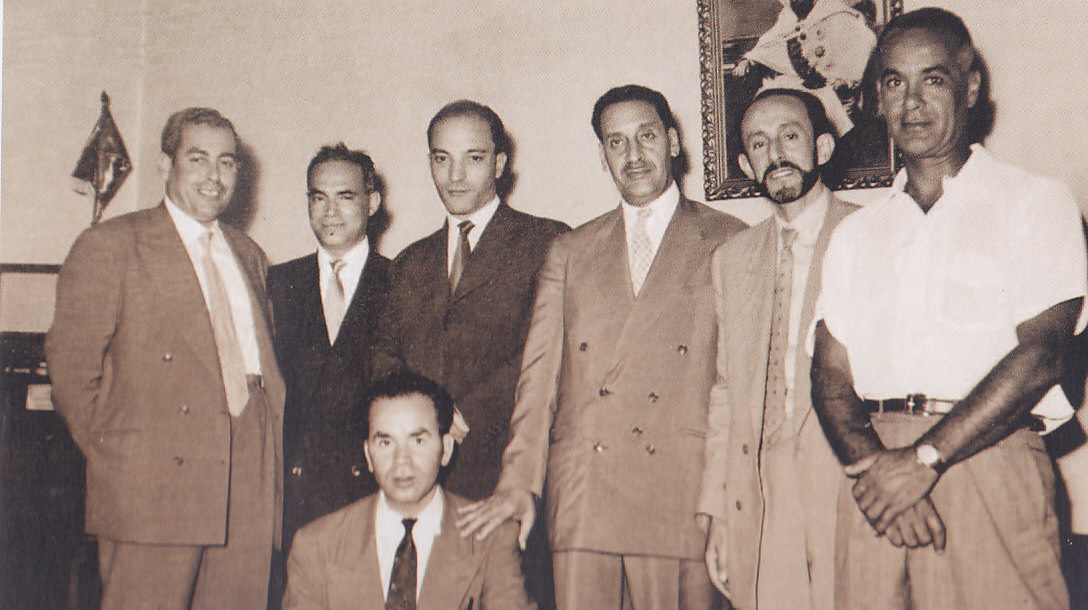
Mohamed El-Ghassiri pictured at a meeting with Omar Derdour, Ferhat Abbas, Ahmed Francis, and others

Mohamed Yeken El-Ghassiri (1915–1974) was an ambassador for Algeria from 1962, the year of Algerian independence, until his death in 1974. Prior to this, he was active in the Algerian resistance.

== Early life and family ==
El-Ghassiri was born in 1915 in Ghassira. He started at the school of Sheikh Giraldin in 1929. At a young age he memorised large chapters of the Koran. In 1932 he travelled to Constantine to continue his studies at the Sheikh Ibn Badis mosque for four years. He taught education in Constantine in the years 1937–1943. While in Constantine he married Khadra Salhi (1926–2011). They had three children; Bassima, Abdelhamid and Bachira. All three shared their father's ethos regarding education.

== Activism and career ==
He began the local Algerian Muslim Scouts movement in Batna in around 1937. He was later imprisoned for his participation in the nationalist demonstrations of 1945.

El-Ghassiri was one of the founders of the Association of Algerian Muslim Ulema. This group was important in the Algerian resistance during the French occupation of Algeria and helped Algeria reach its goal of independence. In 1956 he joined the liberation front, which was in Damascus, Syria. The representation was paramount and played a major role in publicising Algeria's case to the world.

After Algerian independence in 1962, he served as the Algerian ambassador to various Arab countries. He was the first to occupy the post of ambassador to Saudi Arabia, later to Syria, then to Kuwait from 1970. In the role he gained the respect of these nations for Algeria's victory, and was also able to create close international ties due to his diplomatic ability.

El-Ghassiri had a passion for education, and later took charge of numerous schools. He believed education was the key to freedom. He was director of the Arabic school in Philippeville (now Skikda) where he built upon his pedagogical views which he had recorded in a scouting manual published in 1951.

== Death and legacy ==
He remained ambassador until his death on 24 July 1974. His legacy includes impact on education, religion, linguistics and literature. There are numerous mosques and schools in Algeria named after him.
