= Ali El Hammami =

- Born: 1902; Tiaret, Algeria
- Died: December 12, 1949 (aged 46–47); Karachi, Pakistan
- Occupation(s): Teacher, writer
- Known for: Anticolonial activism, advocacy of Maghreb unity
- Notable work: Idriss (novel)
- Movement: North African Star; Arab Maghreb Bureau

Ali El Hammami (1902–1949) was an Algerian intellectual, anticolonial activist, and advocate for Maghreb unity. Born in Tiaret, Algeria, he devoted his life from an early age to the struggle against French and Spanish colonialism in North Africa.

== Biography ==
Born in 1902 into a family from Tiaret, Ali El Hammami accompanied his parents on a pilgrimage to Mecca during his childhood. Upon their return, the family briefly settled in Alexandria, where he continued his education. After the death of his parents, he became actively involved in anticolonial activities and left Egypt to join resistance movements in Morocco.

=== Early anticolonial engagement ===
In the 1920s, Ali El Hammami took part in independence struggles alongside Emir Abdelmalek, the son of Emir Abdelkader, and Emir Abdelkrim El-Khattabi in the Moroccan Rif. In 1924, he led a delegation to Moscow, where he met several prominent figures of the global anticolonial movement, including Ho Chi Minh, with whom he shared an apartment. This period marked the beginning of his international commitment to the independence of the Maghreb and the Muslim world.

=== Activities in Europe ===
Settling in Paris in the 1920s, El Hammami joined nationalist circles and helped found the North African Star, the first Algerian nationalist organization, alongside figures such as Abdelkader Hadj Ali and Mahmoud Ben Lekhal. He also collaborated with resistance publications in Europe and participated in anticolonial international networks. In 1935, he moved to the Middle East but faced numerous hardships and persecutions. With the assistance of Emir Shakib Arslan, he eventually obtained refugee status in the region.

=== Involvement in the Middle East ===
During his stay in the Middle East, from 1935 to 1946, El Hammami taught history and geography in Baghdad. In 1946, he moved to Cairo and took part in founding the Arab Maghreb Bureau, together with Emir Abdelkrim El-Khattabi and other Maghrebi nationalist intellectuals. The bureau aimed to coordinate liberation efforts across the Maghreb.

=== Death and legacy ===
In 1949, El Hammami was appointed by the UDMA of Ferhat Abbas to represent Algeria at the Islamic Economic Congress in Karachi, where he strongly denounced colonialism. He died on December 12, 1949, in a plane crash in Pakistan, along with Mohammed Benaboud and Habib Thameur, delegates from Morocco and Tunisia, respectively. His death caused deep emotion in Algeria, where he was buried in the Sidi M'hamed Cemetery in Algiers. His funeral became a national demonstration, symbolizing the unity of all Algerian political movements of the time.

== Works ==
El Hammami authored several articles and essays addressing the fight against colonialism. His major work, the novel Idriss, stands as both an indictment of colonialism and a plea for Maghreb unity. In it, he emphasized the importance of solidarity among Maghrebi peoples in their struggle against colonial powers. Besides Idriss, he also wrote biographical studies on figures of Maghrebi history such as Ibn Khaldun and Emir Abdelkader, though many of his manuscripts were lost upon his death.

== See also ==
- History of the Maghreb
- North African Star
- UDMA
