= 1951 Algerian Assembly election =

- 4 and 11 February 1951
- All 120 seats in the Algerian Assembly; 61 seats needed for a majority
| Party | Seats | +/– |
|---|---|---|
| Rally of the French People | 32 | −8 |
| Radical Socialist Party | 13 | +11 |
| Democratic Union of the Algerian Manifesto | 7 | −1 |
| French Section of the Workers' International | 5 | +1 |
| Movement for the Triumph of Democratic Liberties | 5 | −4 |
| Popular Republican Movement | 4 | New |
| Algerian Union | 3 | +3 |
| Algerian Communist Party | 1 | 0 |
| Other parties | 1 | New |
| Progressive independents | 15 | New |
| Independents | 34 | −16 |
This lists parties that won seats. See the complete results below.

Elections to the Algerian Assembly were held in Algeria on 4 and 11 February 1951. Like other post-1948 elections in French Algeria, it was rigged by the authorities to ensure the defeat of Algerian nationalists.

== Electoral system ==
The Assembly was elected by two colleges, each of which elected 60 seats; the First College consisted of Europeans and évolués, whilst the Second College was composed of the remainder of the Algerian population.

== Results ==
| Party | First College | | | Second College | | | Total seats | +/– |
| Party | Votes | % | Seats | Votes | % | Seats | Total seats | +/– |
|---|---|---|---|---|---|---|---|---|
| Rally of the French People | | | 32 | | | | 32 | –8 |
| Radical Socialist Party | | | 13 | | | 0 | 13 | +11 |
| Democratic Union of the Algerian Manifesto | | | | | | 7 | 7 | –1 |
| French Section of the Workers' International | | | 5 | | | | 5 | +1 |
| Movement for the Triumph of Democratic Liberties | | | | | | 5 | 5 | –4 |
| Popular Republican Movement | | | 2 | | | 2 | 4 | New |
| Algerian Union | | | | | | 3 | 3 | +3 |
| Algerian Communist Party | | | 1 | | | | 1 | 0 |
| Progressive independents | | | | | | 15 | 15 | New |
| Other parties | | | | | | 1 | 1 | – |
| Independents | | | 7 | | | 27 | 34 | –16 |
| Total | | | 60 | | | 60 | 120 | 0 |
Source: Sternberger et al.
