= Algerian Franco-Muslim Rally =

Assimilationist political party in colonial Algeria

Algerian Franco-Muslim Rally (in French: Rassemblement Franco-Musulman Algérien) was an assimilationist political party in colonial Algeria founded in 1938. RFMA was led by Dr. Mohammed Saleh Bendjelloul.

== Sources ==
- Tlemcani, Rachid, State and Revolution in Algeria. Boulder: Westview Press, 1986.
