= 1986 Algerian National Charter referendum =

16 January 1986

Results
Choice	Votes	%
Yes	10,508,863	98.31%
No	181,063	1.69%
Valid votes	10,689,926	99.31%
Invalid or blank votes	74,102	0.69%
Total votes	10,764,028	100.00%
Registered voters/turnout	10,954,063	98.27%

A referendum on the enrichment of the National Charter (first approved in a 1976 referendum) was held in Algeria on 16 January 1986. The changes were approved by 98% of voters with a turnout of 98%.

== Results ==
Choice	Votes	%
For	10,508,863	98.31
Against	181,063	1.69
Total	10,689,926	100.00
Valid votes	10,689,926	99.31
Invalid/blank votes	74,102	0.69
Total votes	10,764,028	100.00
Registered voters/turnout	10,954,063	98.27
Source: Official Journal
