= 1954 Algerian Assembly election =

- 31 January and 6 February 1954
- All 120 seats in the Algerian Assembly; 61 seats needed for a majority
Party	Seats	+/–
Rally of the French People	39	+7
Radical Socialist Party	13	0
Popular Republican Movement	9	+5
Democratic Union of the Algerian Manifesto	5	−2
French Section of the Workers' International	4	−1
Algerian Communist Party	1	0
Independents	49	0
This lists parties that won seats. See the complete results below.

Elections to the Algerian Assembly were held in Algeria on 31 January and 6 February 1954. Like other post-1948 elections in French Algeria, it was rigged by the authorities to ensure the defeat of Algerian nationalists.

== Electoral system ==
The Assembly was elected by two colleges, each of which elected 60 seats. The First College consisted of Europeans and évolués, whilst the Second College was composed of the remainder of the Algerian population.

== Results ==
Party	First College			Second College			Total seats	+/–
Party	Votes	%	Seats	Votes	%	Seats	Total seats	+/–
Rally of the French People			39				39	+7
Radical Socialist Party			12			1	13	0
Popular Republican Movement			4			5	9	+5
Democratic Union of the Algerian Manifesto						5	5	–2
French Section of the Workers' International			4				4	–1
Algerian Union						0	0	–3
Algerian Communist Party			1				1	0
Independents						49	49	0
Total			60			60	120	0
Source: Sternberger et al.
