= Organic Statute of Algeria =

Statute of 1947

Parliament of the French Fourth Republic
- Long title: Organic Statute of Algeria
- Enacted by: Parliament of the French Fourth Republic
- Repealed: March 16, 1956
- Introduced by: Paul-Émile Viard

Full text
- Statut de 47 at Wikisource
- Status: Repealed

The Organic Statute of Algeria was a legal framework that outlined the devolution of powers from France to French Algeria through the law of September 20, 1947, officially titled "Organic Statute of Algeria". This law was enacted by the French National Assembly during a period of constitutional reform, nationalist demands, and the early stages of the Algerian War.

It established an Algerian Assembly, proclaimed "effective equality among all French citizens" (Article 2), and granted Algeria some autonomous financial and administrative powers. However, the law was criticized for its failure to address Algerian nationalist aspirations fully and for its unequal implementation.

== Historical Context ==
=== French Conquest and Administration of Algeria ===
The French conquest of Algeria began in 1830, with Algeria becoming a French territory. Initially governed as a colony, Algeria underwent various administrative reorganizations. By 1848, it was divided into three departments: Algiers, Constantine, and Oran. Over time, administrative power transitioned from military to civilian governance.

Algeria's indigenous population, however, remained subject to the Indigénat system, which imposed legal and civil restrictions, distinguishing them from European settlers. Despite being classified as French nationals, most indigenous Muslims and Jews did not have full citizenship rights unless they renounced their religious-based personal status.

=== Developments Before 1947 ===
In the late 19th and early 20th centuries, reforms were gradually introduced, granting limited representation and financial autonomy to Algeria. Key milestones included the establishment of Délégations financières in 1898 and the recognition of Algerian civil personality and budgetary independence in 1900.

The Crémieux Decree of 1870 granted French citizenship to Algerian Jews but excluded Muslims, reinforcing the disparity in civil and political rights. Reforms in 1919 and 1944 extended limited political rights to some Muslims, yet full equality remained elusive.

=== Post-World War II and Nationalist Movements ===
The aftermath of World War II saw increasing demands for political reform in Algeria. The Sétif and Guelma massacres of May 1945 highlighted the tensions between French authorities and Algerian nationalists. The Manifesto of the Algerian People, issued in 1943, and subsequent proposals for reform underscored calls for greater autonomy and equality.

In 1946 the Constitution of the Fourth Republic integrated Algeria as part of the French Union, but its provisions left Algeria's status ambiguous, necessitating the 1947 statute.

== Provisions of the Statute ==
The Statute of 1947 reaffirmed Algeria's status as part of the French Republic while granting it administrative and financial autonomy. It also created an Algerian Assembly with 120 members, equally divided between two electoral colleges:

The first college included French citizens and a small number of assimilated Muslims. The second college represented the majority of the Muslim population. The statute declared equality among all French citizens and extended suffrage to Muslim women, though this was not implemented until 1958.

== Implementation and Challenges ==
Despite its progressive intentions, the statute faced widespread opposition. In Algeria, it was seen as insufficient by nationalists and overly liberal by European settlers. The Mouvement pour le triomphe des libertés démocratiques (MTLD) rejected the statute outright, while the Union démocratique du manifeste algérien (UDMA) expressed cautious criticism.

Elections to the Algerian Assembly were marred by electoral fraud, particularly in the second college, undermining its legitimacy.

== Repeal and Aftermath ==
The Statute of 1947 was effectively nullified by the Special Powers Act of March 16, 1956, as part of France's response to the escalating Algerian War. The Algerian Assembly was dissolved the following month, and Algeria was governed directly by French authorities until its independence in 1962.
