= 1947 Algerian municipal elections =

Municipal elections were held in Algeria in October and November 1947, with councils in large cities elected in October, and those in smaller towns in November.

== Results ==
The elections were won by the Movement for the Triumph of Democratic Liberties (MTLD), whose lists were victorious in all major cities.

== Aftermath ==
The results shocked the French establishment, who resolved not to allow it to happen again. In the Assembly elections in 1948 the MTLD and fellow nationalists Democratic Union of the Algerian Manifesto were poised to gain a majority of Second College seats in the second round of voting before the authorities openly rigged the vote in more than two-thirds of constituencies to ensure the victory of pro-government independents.
