= Algerian Assembly =

Algerian Assembly الجمعية الجزائرية Tajmaεt Tadzayrit
- April 22, 1948 – April 12, 1956

Leadership
- President: Abdelkader Sayah (until 1956)

Structure
- Seats: 120 delegates

Elections
- Voting system: Two electoral colleges (one for Europeans and one for Muslims) using proportional representation
- First election: 1948 Algerian territorial elections
- Last election: 1954 Algerian territorial elections

Meeting place
- Algiers (Algeria)

The Algerian Assembly was the deliberative assembly of French Algeria, created by the law of September 20, 1947, which enacted the Statute of 1947 for Algeria. The assembly was elected three times (April 1948, February 1951, and February 1954) before being dissolved by decree on April 12, 1956.

== Mission ==
The Algerian Assembly was created as part of the legislative reorganization of Algeria and ended the system of governance through decrees. Its powers were shared with the French Parliament regarding laws common to both Metropolitan France and Algeria, as well as the military, electoral, judicial, and administrative organization of Algeria. The assembly approved budgetary plans, extended metropolitan laws to Algeria, and enacted specific regulations for Algeria that were not yet covered by metropolitan legislation.

The assembly, first elected in April 1948, was dissolved by Decree No. 56-379 on April 12, 1956. Its powers were transferred to the Governor General of Algeria.

== Composition ==
The assembly consisted of 120 members, elected equally by two electoral colleges.

The first college included citizens "with French civil status," including approximately 58,000 Algerians who had obtained this status. The second college represented approximately 1,300,000 Muslim citizens. Elections in the second college were frequently marred by electoral fraud orchestrated by the administration during the 1948, 1951, and 1954 elections. This was primarily aimed at suppressing victories by the Mouvement pour le triomphe des libertés démocratiques (MTLD) of Messali Hadj and the Union démocratique du manifeste algérien (UDMA) of Ferhat Abbas, both of which had won significant support in the 1947 municipal elections.

- 1948 Algerian Assembly election
- 1951 Algerian Assembly election
- 1954 Algerian Assembly election

== Organization and Functioning ==
=== Leadership ===
The assembly's bureau consisted of a president, three vice-presidents, and four secretaries. The presidency alternated annually between representatives from the two electoral colleges.
