= Ghassira =

Ghassira غسيرة ⵜⴰⵖⵙⵉⵔⵜ

- Location within Algeria
- Coordinates: 35.08161°N 6.20608°E
- Country: Algeria
- Province: Batna
- Time zone: UTC+1 (West Africa Time)

Ghassira is a town in Batna Province, north-eastern Algeria.

== Notable residents ==
- Mohamed El-Ghassiri (1915–1974): active in the Algerian resistance, post-independence ambassador from 1962 until his death.
