= Unions latines =

Algerian political party

Unions latines (UL) was an early 20th century fascist Algerian Pied-noir political party.

== Background ==
Deeply antisemitic and xenophobic, the political focus of the extreme right Pied-Noir settlers in Algeria was guided by the unrelenting torrent of violence between them and local Muslim population. In 1871, the Kabyle Revolt had resulted in the slaughter of 2,686 settlers by Berber rebels. This led to repressive measures including reparations, summary executions and laws that stripped tribes of their property rights. By 1920 the legal reforms of 1883 and 1887 had given 2.6 million hectares of Algerian land to Europeans.

Impoverished by these reforms, Algerians were forced to work as virtual slave labor on lands now owned by Europeans. They grew more violent under the brutal colonial laws known as the Code de l'Indigénat under which the legal rights of "citizens" were formally distinguished from "subjects". The Algerian "subjects" were not afforded any right to jury trials. They were punished heavily for even minor infractions and forced to pay burdensome fines. The result of these measures was a murder rate eight times greater than that of Metropolitan France.

When the Jonnart Law in 1919 gave Algerians mostly symbolic political rights, a great torrent of anti-Muslim sentiment was unleashed that mirrored the earlier antisemitic colonial politics of the 1890s. The rift between continental republicanism and colonial politics deepened in the 1920s as anti-Republican movements like the Action Francaise (Af) and Jeunesses patriotes (JP) emerged in opposition to countless real or imagined enemies—communists, socialists, metropolitans, Muslims and Jews were all seen as acting against settler interests. Even though AF and JP were established in continental France, they were not able to duplicate their success in Algeria due to their core position in support of French imperial monarchy.

== Algérianité ==
Algérianité (Algerianess) was a synthesis of revisionist history and various racial theories of civilization that claimed the successes of Algerian settlers lay in their unique blend of Spanish, French and Italian ancestry that had created a new, superior race of Algerian Europeans. Algérianité had roots in the works of early 20th-century writers like Louis Bertrand and Robert Randau. It was the conceptual basis for the distinct colonial settler identity of UL and its supporters.

== Antisemitism ==
Antisemitism was rampant among settlers who had rejected the Crémieux Decree that granted French citizenship to Algerian Jews. European settlers saw the Jewish population as a threat to their electoral dominance. The anti-semitic tone in municipal politics intensified as "Latin" settlers voted seeking to politically weaken Algerian Jews. UL gained support under the anti-Semitic mayor Jules Molle who promoted the party through his paper Le Petit Oranais which was emblazoned with a swastika on its front page.

== Colonial fascism ==
UL developed a new form of colonial fascism in response to the political climate in Algeria. UL supporters were anti-semitic and xenophobic Algerians of European descent who opposed traditional right wing politics as much as left and center parties. They wanted independence from Metropolitan France which they saw as weak, immoral and effeminate, distinguishing them from the continental far right. The relatively large number of the European settlers in Algeria gave the imperial fascist movement greater momentum than similar movements in Tunisia and Indochina.

The UL's promises of Latin hegemony gained them many adherents in Oran where the staunchly anti-Muslim local population believed in the racial superiority of the "Latin race". Critically, UL made overtures of support for the creation of an independent settler state. They were the dominant political party in Algerian municipal politics from 1924 until Molle's death in 1931.
