= Teniet El Abed =

Teniet El Abed ثنية العابد ⵜⵉⵙⵉⵏⵜ ⵍⵄⴻⴱⴷ
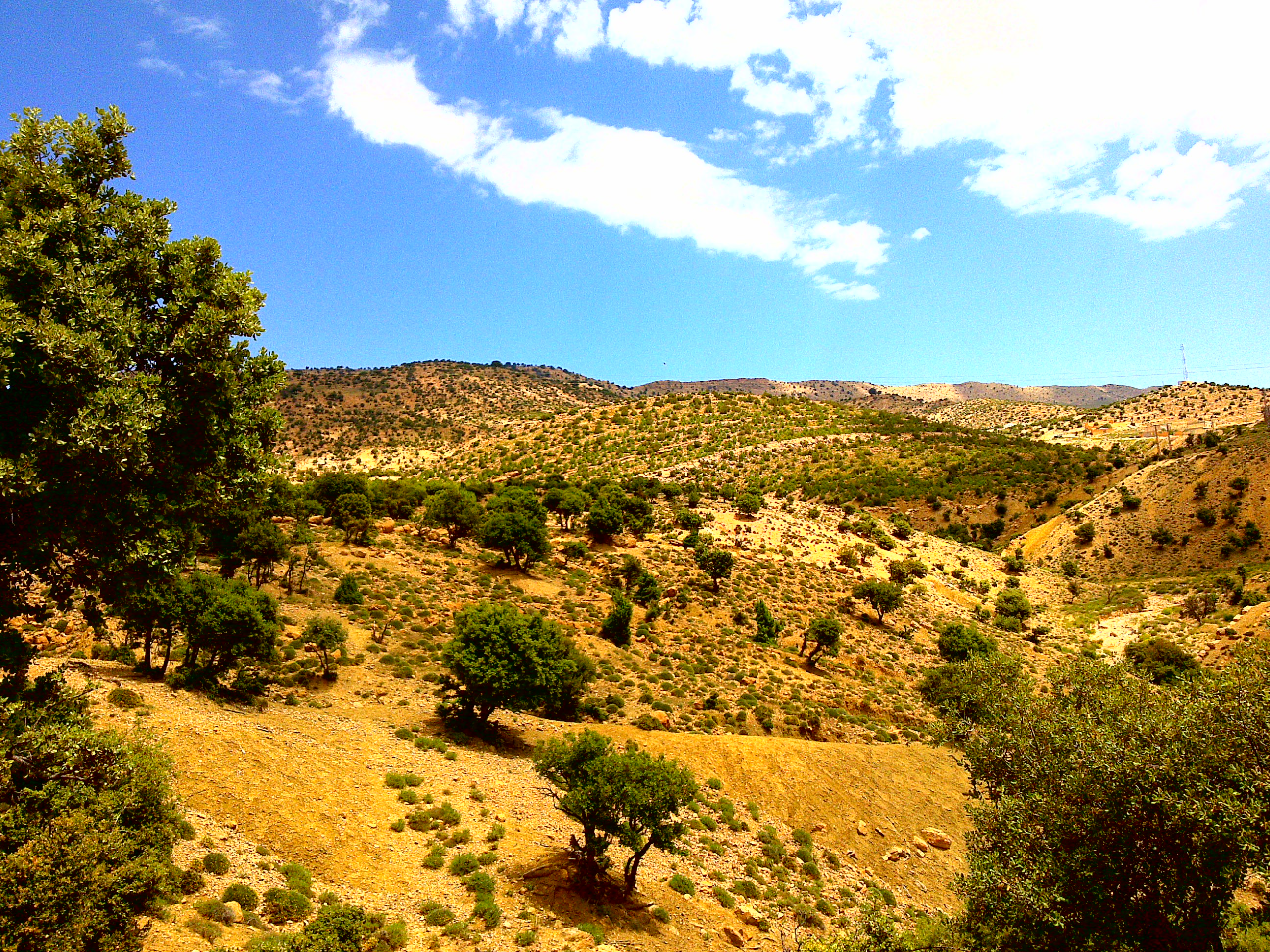

- Location within Algeria
- Coordinates: 35°14′49″N 6°11′26″E
- Country: Algeria
- Province: Batna

Population (2008)
  - Total: 11,338
- Time zone: UTC+1 (West Africa Time)

Teniet El Abed (Arabic: ثنية العابد) is a town in the Aurès Mountains of north-eastern Algeria. As of 2008 it had a population of 11,338 people. It is located along National Route 49, 59 kilometres (37 mi) south of Batna, 76 kilometres (47 mi) northeast of Biskra, and 122 kilometres (76 mi) west of Khenchela.

== History ==
On January 4, 2003. the Groupe Salafiste pour la Prédication et le Combat (GSPC) ambushed a military convoy at Teniet El-Abed, killing 43 soldiers and wounding 19.

== Villages ==
The commune of Teniet El Abed consists of 25 localities

- Aïn Bendou
- Bali (or Baâli)
- Boughrara
- Draa Taga
- Guerza
- Halaoua Fedj El Kadi
- Khirbèche
- Hidous
- Lakhouada
- M'Zatra
- Moulia
- Ouassas
- Ouled Azzous
- Ouled Malem
- Ouled Si Abbès
- Sara
- Tafrount
- Tanakaret
- Taouzient El Kantara
- Tazourit
- Tchaghat
- Teniet El Abed
- Tizougaghine
- Tizribine
- Tleth

== Notable people ==
- Omar Derdour, figure of the Algerian War of Independence (1913-2009)
- Jean Servier -ethnologist
