= Federation of Elected Natives =

The Federation of Elected Natives (French: Fédération des élus indigènes algeriens) was a grouping of elected officials in French Algeria. Its most prominent members were Mohamed Bendjelloul and Ferhat Abbas.

== History ==
The Federation was established in 1927 by the assimilationists in the Young Algerians. Many of its members were teachers and liberal professionals, and the organisation became influential in Constantine. In 1936 it formed the Algerian Muslim Congress (CMA) alongside the Algerian People's Party and the Association of Algerian Muslim Ulema.
