= Robert Randau =

French Algerian novelist (1873–1950)

Robert Randau (1873-1950) was a French Algerian novelist and author of Les Colons (1907) and Les Algérianistes (1911), works in which he depicted European Algerian settlers in a positive light compared with the decadence of Metropolitan France. In Colonial Algeria he was considered the standard that embodied a school of uniquely North African literature. His other works include: Le Commandant et les Foulbé (1910), Le Chef des Porte-Plume (1922), L'homme qui rit jaune (1926), Isabelle Eberhardt (1945).

== Biography ==
"Robert Randau" was a pseudonym for Robert Arnaud. He was born in Algeria and was a colonial administrator. He wrote twenty fiction novels and published other political essays during his forty year career, many of which were spent in the Haute Volta. Most of his work is about Afrique-Occidentale française (French West Africa), but several novels are about Algeria.

== Les Colons ==
Les Colons was the first novel about Algeria written by a French Algerian. The novel is considered the first literary work that explores algérianisme, the new race conceived to lay claim to Algerian independence and autonomy. While prevailing Orientalist attitudes emphasized the conflict of self and identity of conflicting identities this was rejected by the Algerianist writers who described an authentic Algerian identity.

== Algérianisme ==
Randau coined the term algérianisme in 1911 to denote the cultural identity of European Algerian colonists as separate and distinct from the European continent. The settlers embraced their European descent and the idea of Muslim inferiority but saw themselves as a new race and culture unique to colonial Algeria.

Randau didn't quite advocate for separatism between the Algerian colony and France. He defined the Algérianistes as those who "want Algeria to have complete administrative and financial autonomy, who advocate racial fusion, and who believe that the union of interests is the precursor to the union of hearts".

== See also ==
- Louis Bertrand
- Edmond Gojon
- Louis Lecoq
