= Manifesto of the Algerian People =

1943 Algerian document

On February 10, 1943, Ferhat Abbas published the Manifesto of the Algerian People (French: Manifeste du peuple algérien), which called for a new status for the “Algerian Nation” and was signed by 28 elected Muslim officials.

The manifesto condemns colonialism and asserts the right for the Algerian people to self govern. It demands the drafting of a constitution that guarantees liberty and equality for all people regardless of race and religion, the recognition of Arabic as an official language with the same status as French, and freedom of religion with the separation of church and state. Its addendum calls for the creation of an Algerian Assembly at the end of the war. It suggests that “Algeria be an autonomous state federated with France...after a series of measures breaking with the colonial government, through negotiation with the French authorities”.

The text embodies the accomplishments of both the followers of Messali Hadj and those of Ferhat Abbas. It establishes, according to Benjamin Stora's expression, the political majority of the Algerian people.

The Manifesto was given on March 31, 1943 (and its addendum in May 1943) to the general governor Marchen Peyrouton. Charles de Gaulle arrived and called for the end of the project. On June 23, 1943, the general Catroux, the new general governor of Algeria, rejected the Manifesto.

The AML (Amis du Manifeste des libertés, or, the Friends of the Manifesto and Liberty) was created in March 1944 to defend it.

== Context ==
During World War II, taking advantage of German-occupied France and of Operation Torch, that is, the Anglo-American landing in Algiers in 1942, Ferhat Abbas, would unite all the Algerian political forces (elected members of the Algerian People's Party (PPA) and of the Ulama) around a common political project: the manifesto of the Algerian people.

On January 17, 1943, members of the PPA and of the ulama as well as several Muslim representatives met at the house of the lawyer and politician Ahmed Boumendjel in Algiers.

Ferhat Abbas was enlisted to write the text of the manifesto, which he would write in Sétif in a room above his pharmacy.
