= Independentism =

Independentism may refer to one of the following concepts:

- the church system of the Independents in English church history, see Independent (religion)
- advocacy of the independence of a certain region or territory, usually by secession from a larger political unit
  - sometimes used interchangeably with separatism
