= Étoile Nord-Africaine =

- President: Messali Hadj
- Secretary-General: Imache Amar
- Founded: 1926
- Banned: 1937
- Preceded by: Young Algerians
- Succeeded by: Algerian People's Party
- Ideology: Algerian nationalism Arab nationalism Algerian independence Islamic nationalism Anti-colonialism; Anti-Imperialism

The Étoile Nord-Africaine or ENA (French for North African Star) was an early Algerian nationalist and Arab nationalist organization founded in 1926. It was dissolved first in 1929, then reorganised in 1933 under the name of Glorieuse ENA and again dissolved in 1937. It is considered a forerunner of the Algerian National Liberation Front (FLN), who fought France during the Algerian War (1954–62).

It was formed in 1926 by Algerian nationalist politician Hadj-Ali Abdelkader and called for an uprising against French colonial rule and total independence. It had no armed wing and attempted to organize peacefully. The party maintained links with the French Communist Party (PCF), until its dissolution. Later the Comintern, the PCF declared Algerian national independence premature. Messali Hadj joined the ENA shortly after its creation and in 1927 participated in the creation of the League Against Imperialism. The reorganisation of the 'Glorieuse ENA' in 1933 elected Messali Hadj President, Imache Amar Secretary General and Belkacem Radjef Treasurer. The party broke ties with the communist party. It also voted for an ambitious plan to lead Algeria to independence by peaceful means. The Étoile was dissolved by the French authorities in 1937 and Messali was imprisoned. It is considered by some the first modern Algerian political party.

In 1937, two months after its dissolution, the leaders of ENA, including Messali, founded the Algerian People's Party (PPA). This was subsequently dissolved in 1946 and was immediately followed by the creation of the Movement for the Triumph of Democratic Liberties (MTLD), which later became increasingly militant. Messali distanced himself from the MTLD mainstream when it became involved in the Algerian War started by the FLN in November 1954.

== Literature ==
- Rachid Tlemcani, State and Revolution in Algeria, Boulder: Westview Press (1986).
- Benyoucef Ben Khedda, "Les Origines du 1er Novembre 1954", Algiers: Editions Dahlab (1989).
