= Le Petit Oranais =

Le Petit Oranais was an antisemitic newspaper operated by the Jules Molle in Algeria. For many years Le Petit Oranais was published with a swastika on its front page. The paper promoted the Unions latines (UL) party, predominant in the municipal politics of Oran until Molle's death in 1931.

== Background ==
Molle achieved great electoral success by reigniting antisemitic politics in Oran. He had founded the UL party in 1914 to create a union of French and Spanish ("Latin") colonial settlers against the "electoral action of the Jewish bloc". He was elected mayor of the city in 1921.

== Election of 1925 ==
Antisemitic propaganda intensified during the municipal elections of 1925. Molle won with a margin exceed 2,000 votes. On May 4–6 in the days following his electoral victory his supporters attacked Jewish residents of Oran. In August 1925 the Procurer General said that Le Petit Oranais had been used to incite the "murder and pillage", but the case against Molle was dropped by the Minister of Justice.

== See also ==
- Le Republicain de Constantine
