= Jules Molle =

French politician

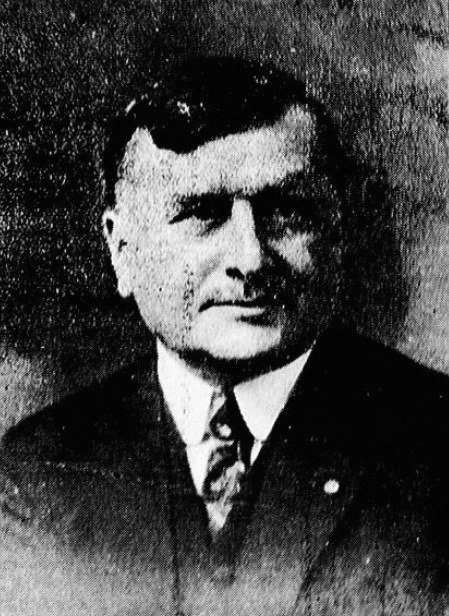
Jules Molle

Jules Molle (16 February 1868, Aubenas - 8 January 1931) was a Fascist French Algerian politician. He was the founder of the Unions latines political party, the mayor of Oran and the publisher of an Anti-Jewish newspaper, Le Petit Oranais, which ran for years with a swastika on its front and openly called for violence and persecution against Algerian Jews. His victory in the 1921 mayoral election was followed by street violence against Jews. After he was arrested in the year 1925 on charges of incitement to violence, pro-Molle rioters attacked and pillaged the Jewish quarter in Oran. By the time army forces had quelled the violence, two Jews had been killed and fifty wounded. Molle died from a heart failure in 1931.
