= Sidi Lakhdar Mosque =

Mosque in Constantine City, Constantine Province, Algeria

- مسجد سيدي الاخضر
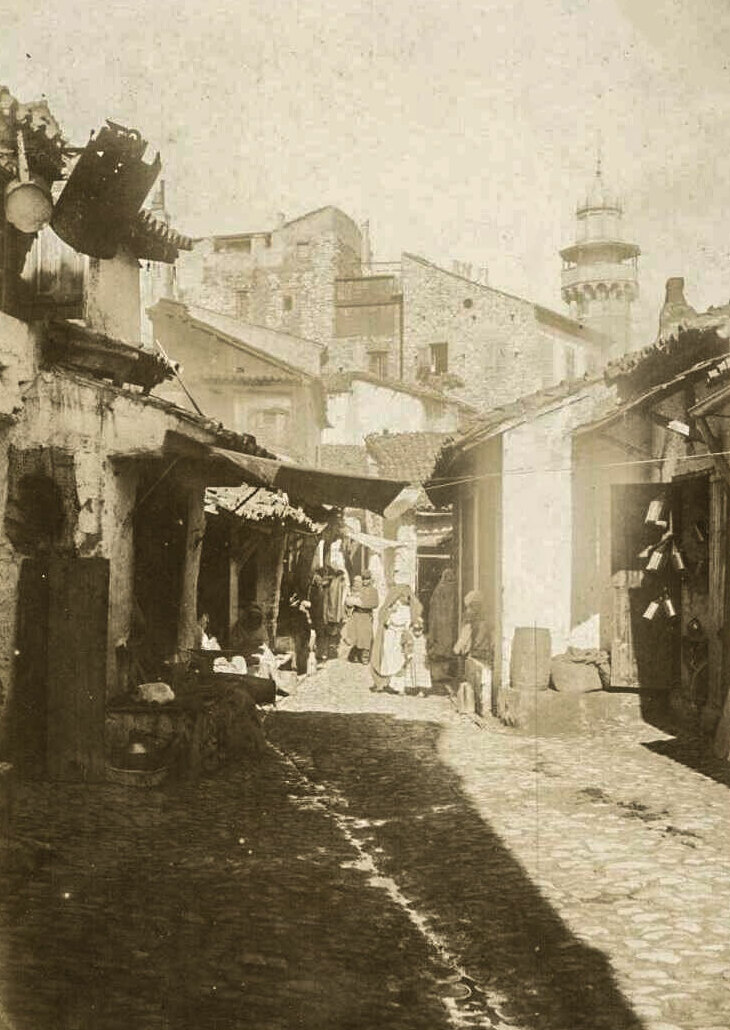
- The mosque, in 1900

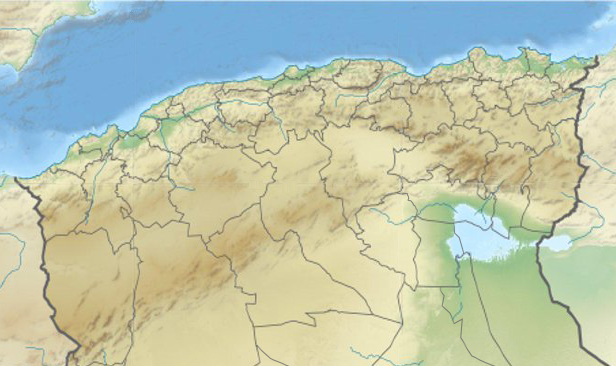
- Location of the mosque in northern Algeria

Religion
- Affiliation: Sunni Islam
- Ecclesiastical or organizational status: Mosque
- Status: Active

Location
- Location: Al-Jazzarin neighborhood, Constantine, Constantine Province
- Country: Algeria
- Interactive map of Sidi Lakhdar Mosque
- Coordinates: 36°22′04″N 6°36′50″E

Architecture
- Type: Islamic architecture
- Style: Ottoman
- Completed: 1743

Specifications
- Capacity: 500 worshippers
- Dome: 1
- Minaret: 1
- Materials: Marble; timber

The Sidi Lakhdar Mosque (Arabic: مسجد سيدي الاخضر), or Djamâa Lakhdar, is a Sunni mosque located in the city of Constantine, in the Constantine Province of Algeria.

== History ==
The Sidi Lakhdar Mosque is located in the Al-Jazzarin neighborhood, and it was built in 1743 by the Bey Hussein bin Hussein, known as Bouhanak, who was buried in this mosque after his death. In 1913 the mosque, which witnessed many scholarly sessions of Sheikh Abdelhamid Ben Badis, installed his seminary and marked the center of his foundation "Algerian Muslim Congress" (CMA).

== Architecture ==
The mosque is mainly characterised by its curved marble columns and its admirable sculpted capitals. The sanctuary of the mosque, which has a rectangular shape, is located on the first floor and can be entered through two open doors in the wall opposite the mihrab and its "minbar" of carved wood. The mosque building was classified in 1905 and its decoration remains a witness on the history of its construction through the roof and wooden columns.

== Gallery ==
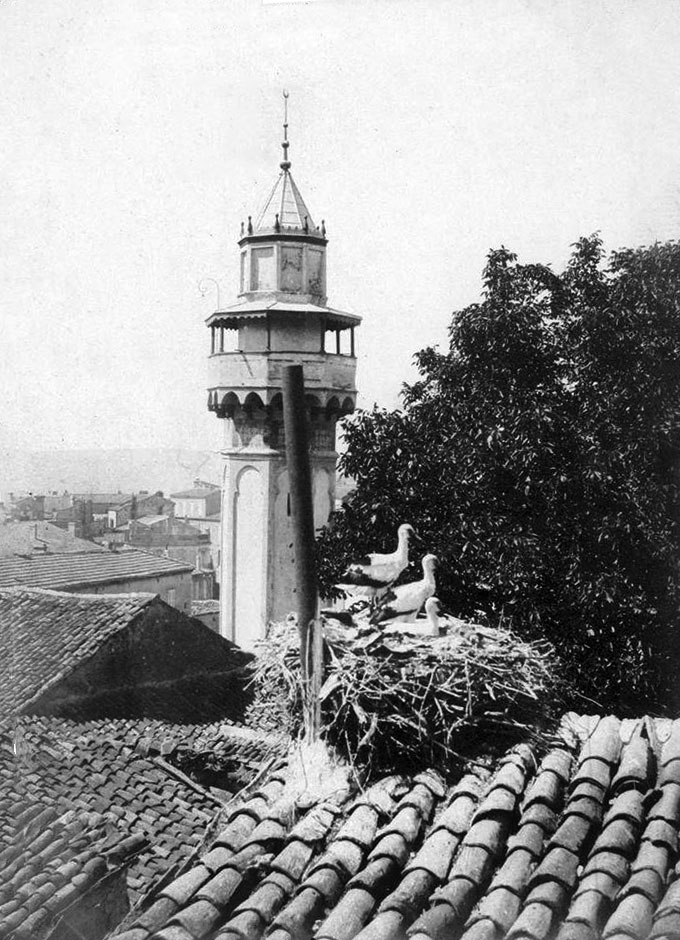
The mosque minaret in 1900

== See also ==
- Ahmed Bey Palace
- Islam in Algeria
- List of mosques in Algeria
