= Belkacem Radjef =

Algerian nationalist and revolutionary

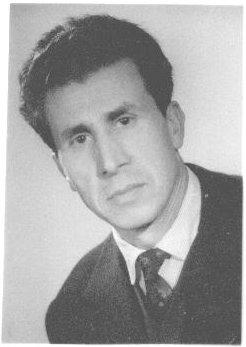
- Born: September 19, 1909; Larbaâ Nath Irathen
- Died: May 25, 1989 (aged 79); Algiers, Algeria
- Monuments: Agouni Bouragh, Larbaa Nath Irathen Commomeration= Main Post Office, Tizi Ouzou

Belkacem Radjef (1909–1989) was born in Fort-National (today Larbaâ Nath Irathen, Tizi Ouzou Province), Algeria and spent 32 years of his life in the fight for Algerian independence from French colonialism. He joined the friends of El Ouma, a group of leaders of the first movement for independence in 1930 after the L'Etoile Nord Africaine had been dissolved in 1929. It was reconstituted in May 1933 under the name of Glorieuse Etoile Nord Africaine. He was voted treasurer with Amar Imache secretary and Messali Hadj president. He was one of the lieutenants and advisors of Messali in the 1930s, 40's and early 50's.

He was voted onto the thirty-member central committee of the Etoile Nord-Africaine (ENA) and remained in this position through both subsequent renaming of the organization: the Parti du Peuple Algerien in 1937 and the Mouvement pour le Triomphe des Libertés Démocratiques in 1946. The start of the Algerian War of Independence on November 1, 1954, marked the merger of the military, religious, and political independence associations into the Front de Libération nationale (FLN). Belkacem Radjef was arrested by the DST (Direction de la Surveillance du Territoire) on December 23rd,1954 seven weeks after the beginning of the insurrection. He was released from prison (La Sante) in October 1956 and immediately joined the French Federation based in Paris of the FLN and became a permanent member of the parti's central committee until the country's independence in 1962.

He then joined the new Algerian government as a special attaché to the Minister of Labor and Social Affairs (Bachir Boumaza). At the same time, he founded Le Secours National Algerien, whose mission was to feed, lodge, and educate the neglected shoe-shining youth of the colonial era. Radjef Belkacem retired in 1978. He lived in Algiers from 1962 to the year of his death in 1989. He is resting in the Carre des Martyrs in the national cemetery of El Alia.

Personal Life: Radjef had three children with his French wife, Reine Bulot: Tarek, Yamina, and Patrick (né Amar).
