= Young Algerians =

Political group in French Algeria

Young-Algerians
- Movement of the Young-Algerians
- (Arabic) الشباب الجزائريين (French) Jeunes-Algériens
- Named after: Young Turks
- Successor: Étoile Nord-Africaine
- Formation: 1907; 119 years ago
- Type: Political party
- Key people: Chérif Benhabyles; Ben Ali Fekar; Omar Bouderba; Benthami Belkacem; Kaid Hammoud

The Young Algerians (French: Jeunes Algériens) were a political group established in French Algeria in 1907. They were assimilationists, meaning that they wanted Algerian society to integrate with French colonial society. As such, they called for reforms that would give France's Algerian subjects the same rights as French citizens enjoyed.

Influential figures in the group included Khalid ibn Hashim and Ferhat Abbas.

== History ==
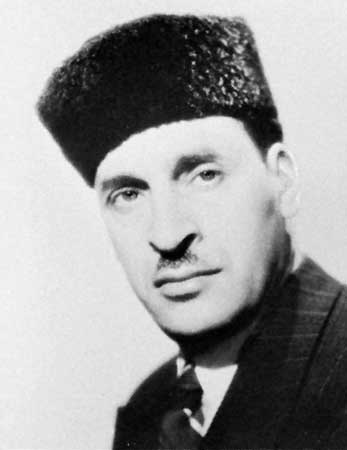
Ferhat Abbas, an influential member of the Young Algerians

The Young Algerians emerged from a new group of middle class Algerians who were integrated into the French economic system and had gone through the French education system. They were influenced by the Young Tunisians movement founded in 1907, and established a number of study circles. In 1908 they went to France to meet Prime Minister Georges Clemenceau and expressed their opposition to Algerian conscription unless they were extended full civil rights. Clemenceau subsequently gave Muslims the right to elect Algerian members of the general councils, rather than have them appointed by the French. They sent another delegation to France in 1912 to present the "Young Algerians Manifesto", which demanded reforms including equal taxation, representation in the French National Assembly, wider suffrage and the abolition of the Code de l'Indigénat. Only minimal reforms were made in French parliamentary debates in 1913-1914, as French settler interests in the parliament were able to push back on major reforms.

They published a number of journals including L'Islam and El-Hack.

Although the group was, for a time, at the forefront of the Algerian resistance to French colonial policy, it never gained much support either from the Algerians, who saw them as aloof and overly French, or from the colons (European immigrants), who feared and suspected them. This meant that they usually performed badly in elections. In an attempt to overcome this, the Young Algerians gained the support of the popular Khalid ibn Hashim, the grandson of Abd al Qadir, the resistance fighter of the 1830s.

The Young Algerians successfully used France's need to conscript its Algerian subjects for World War I to extract a number of minor reforms from France in the immediate pre-war years. In 1917, when Clemenceau returned to power in France, a more serious attempt at reform was made but due to colon opposition, this was watered down and became the Jonnart Law passed in 1919. This reform was divisive, splitting the movement between Khalid, who demanded much more far reaching reform, and more moderate elements such as Benthai, who were largely content with the reforms as a step in the right direction.

== The Manifesto of the Young Algerians ==
On the eve of the First World War, the decree of February 3, 1912, established compulsory military service by drawing lots for a certain number of Algerian natives (military conscription). The indigenous press then seized on the subject to demand French citizenship for the Algerian native in return. And in June 1912, in Bône (Annaba), a delegation of nine Young Algerians submitted a note to French parliamentarians. This note would later be called the "Young Algerian Manifesto".

=== Demands ===
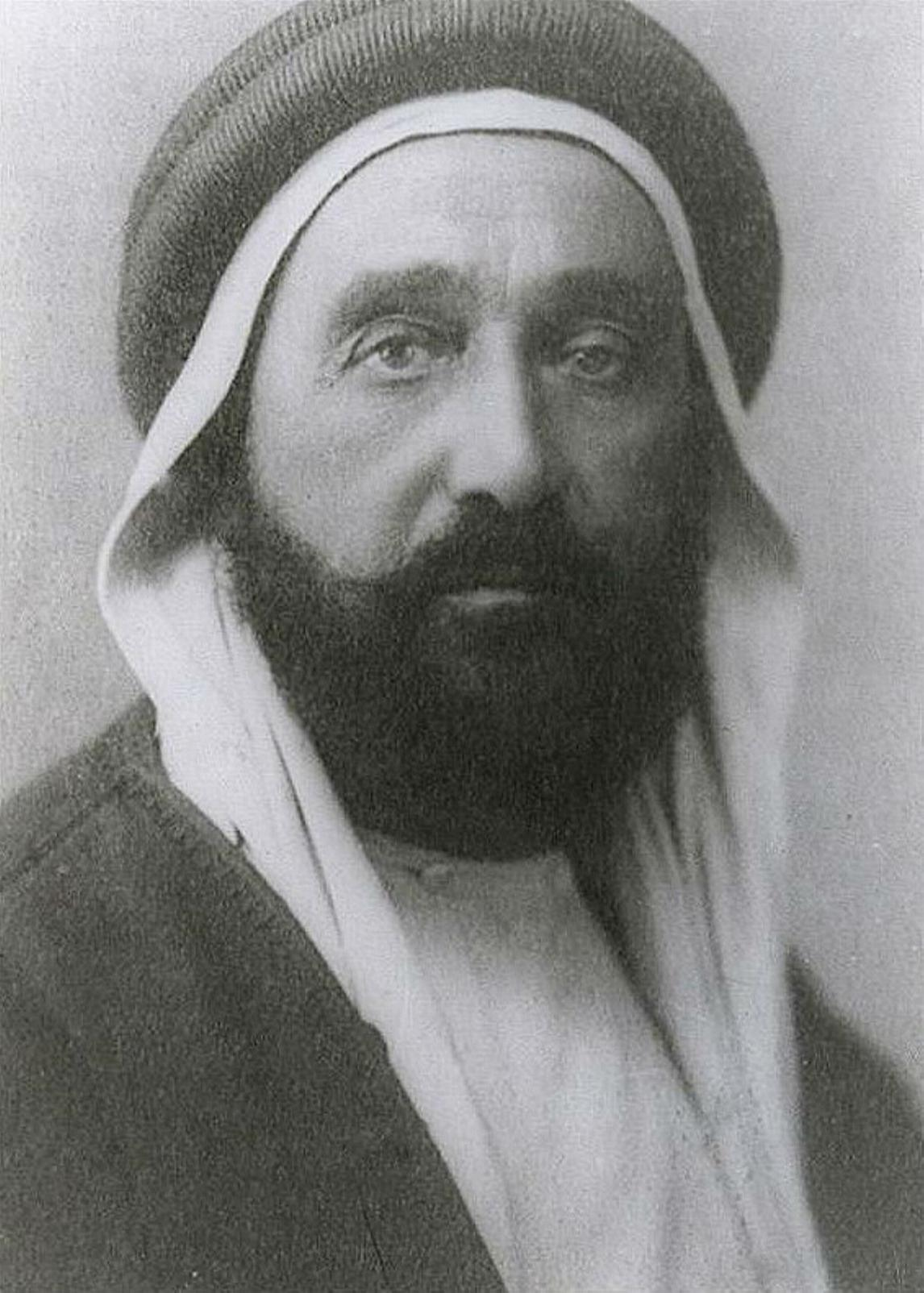
Portrait of Emir Khaled

The group demanded, in compensation for accepting military service:

- The reform of the repressive regime (code of the Native)
- A fair distribution of taxes and an equitable allocation of budgetary resources (i.e. the abolition of "Arab taxes" specific to Muslims and equality in the distribution of charges with Europeans)
- A serious and sufficient political representation in the assemblies of Algeria and the metropolis
- A representation of Algerian Natives in the French Parliament
- That those who have fulfilled the obligation of military service, by way of call-up or voluntary engagement, have the right to opt for the status of French citizen without being subject to the current formalities and upon simple declaration

In 1913, Emir Khaled approached the movement and made a lecture tour in Paris where he defended their program. He declared that he wished "very reasonably for rights for those who have accepted all duties including the blood tax", and concluded:

"Instruct us, assist us as you can do in times of peace. Associate us with your prosperity and your justice. We will be with you in times of danger."

== See also ==
- Messali Hadj
- Étoile Nord-Africaine
- Algerian nationalism
