= Béni-oui-oui =

Derogatory term for algerians

Béni-oui-oui was a derogatory term for Muslims considered to be collaborators with the French colonial institutions in North Africa during the period of French rule. French administrators in Algeria relied heavily on Muslim intermediaries in their dealings with the indigenous population and many of these cadis (local judges), tax collectors or other tribal authorities were considered by nationalists to be mere rubber stamps and incapable of independent initiative.

The word is derived from "beni", the Arabic term for "sons of", e.g. used to name tribes in Arabic, and "oui", the French language term for "yes". It means "the tribe of the yes-men", a group of persons who systematically give their unanimous approval when asked for. An explanation given in the Bulletin de la Société d'anthropologie de Paris in 1893 is that some "natives" systematically answered "oui, oui" (yes, yes) when a colonial administrator asked them any question.

The word was already in use by 1888–1889 in Metropolitan France (used to label some members of the National Assembly) and Algeria and in 1919 in Morocco.

== See also ==
- Colonial mentality
- Comprador
- Sycophant
- Uncle Tom
