= 1976 Algerian National Charter referendum =

27 June 1976
- Do you agree on the National Charter which is proposed to you

Results
Choice	Votes	%
Yes	7,130,033	98.37%
No	118,508	1.63%
Valid votes	7,248,541	99.42%
Invalid or blank votes	42,068	0.58%
Total votes	7,290,609	100.00%
Registered voters/turnout	7,940,978	91.81%

A referendum on a National Charter was held in Algeria on 27 June 1976. The charter committed the country to socialism adapted to third-world conditions, and was approved by 98% of voters with a turnout of 92%.

== Results ==
Choice	Votes	%
For	7,130,033	98.37
Against	118,508	1.63
Total	7,248,541	100.00
Valid votes	7,248,541	99.42
Invalid/blank votes	42,068	0.58
Total votes	7,290,609	100.00
Registered voters/turnout	7,940,978	91.81
Source: Official Journal
