= Friends of the Manifesto and Liberty =

The Friends of the Manifesto and Liberty (French: Amis du Manifeste et de la Liberté, AML) was a political movement in French Algeria.

== History ==
The party was founded in March 1944 by Ferhat Abbas in order to publicize and defend the Manifesto of the Algerian People. Its demands included equal rights for the Muslim population and an autonomous Algeria federated with France.

The party provide to be one of the most successful parties in Algerian history, gaining hundreds of thousands of members and the support of the banned Algerian People's Party and the Association of Algerian Muslim Ulema. However, French officials refused to speak to the party and used the Sétif disturbances of May 8, 1945 as a pretext for dissolving it and arresting Abbas.

A similar movement, the Democratic Union of the Algerian Manifesto was founded the following year.
