= Association of Algerian Muslim Ulema =

Algerian Islamic organization

- جمعيّة العلماء المسلمين الجزائريّين
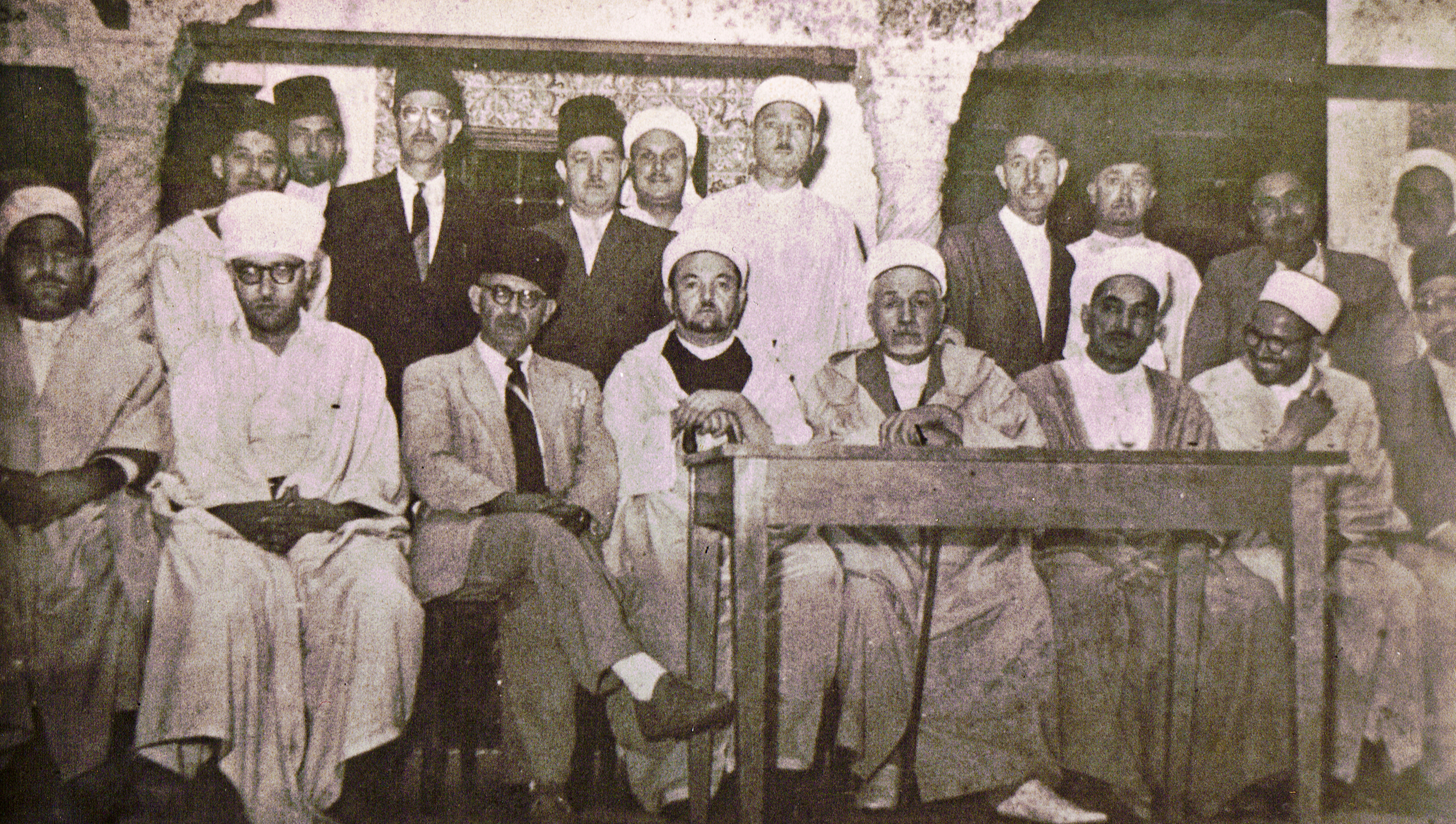
- Abbreviation: AOMA
- Formation: 5 May 1931
- Founder: Abdelhamid Ben Badis
- Dissolved: 1956
- Location: French Algeria

The Association of Algerian Muslim Ulama (Arabic: جمعيّة العلماء المسلمين الجزائريّين, French: Association des Oulémas Musulmans Algériens, AOMA), commonly known as Jam'iyat al-'Ulama (Arabic: جمعيّة العلماء), was an Islamist and Arab nationalist cultural and religious movement in French Algeria led by Abdelhamid Ben Badis. Its motto was "Islam is our religion, Algeria is our homeland, Arabic is our language".

The association emphasised the Arab-Islamic national identity of Algeria by encouraging education and the use of the Arabic language instead of French. They became the strongest defender of Arab and Muslim culture and a major provider of education in Arabic.

== History ==
The organisation was established on 5 May 1931 in Constantine by Abdelhamid Ben Badis, with a leadership consisting largely of middle-class men, most of whom were Arabic-speaking schoolteachers. It supported Islamic reformism and was strongly opposed to the marabouts. It opposed assimilation with the French, but did not support independence, instead supporting Arab nationalism until 1955, when it backed the incipient National Liberation Front insurgency and played an important role; many of the Algerian militants in the war against France, such as Brahim Mezhoudi and Nacer Mohammedi, were either sympathetic to or linked to the Association. Despite this, the French authorities sought to closely control the organisation, eventually leading to it forming alliances with nationalist parties. In 1936 it formed the Algerian Muslim Congress (CMA) alongside the Algerian People's Party and the Federation of Elected Natives. In 1938, the association issued a fatwa declaring naturalised Algerians to be non-Muslims. Ben Badis identified Islam, Arabism and nationalism as the three main components of the Algerian national character. Ben Badis's fellow 'alim Ahmad Tawfiq al-Madani (1889–1983) wrote extensive historical writings in Arabic celebrating the Muslim and Arab ancestors of Algeria.

The association was crucial in attracting attention to what was happening in Mandatory Palestine. They played a leading role in influencing Algerian public opinion through articles and declarations published in their weekly newspapers, Al-Basa'ir and Al-Shihab. Abdelhamid Ben Badis described what was happening in Palestine in 1936 as an "insult to all Muslim countries and a degradation of Arabism". Al-Tayyib al-'Aqbi (1889–1965) described the hardship in Palestine in 1947 as a "test set up by God in order to examine the Muslims and the Arabs' faith" and stressed the view that Palestine belongs to all Arabs and not only to Palestinians.

When Ben Badis died in 1940, Bachir Ibrahimi became AOMA president. It supported the Friends of the Manifesto and Liberty after its formation in 1944. In 1956 AOMA was dissolved by the French authorities.

Despite its dissolution in 1956, the AOMA's ideological contribution to Algeria's political scene was significant. After independence, both Ahmed Ben Bella and Houari Boumédiène used reformist Islam as a tool of political legitimacy; however, Islamism would challenge both regimes. The Association's impact on the political scene also contributed to the emergence of Al Qiyam in the mid 1960s (many of its members were from the association) which "presented itself as the inheritor of Ben Badis and his movement". This movement was the precursor to the Islamic Salvation Front.
