= Mohammed Saleh Bendjelloul =

Politician

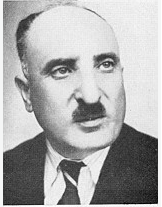
Mohammed Saleh Bendjelloul.png

Dr. Mohammed Saleh Bendjelloul (1893–1985) was an Algerian general practitioner and a moderate nationalist politician. He co-founded the "Fédération des élus indigènes" alongside Ferhat Abbas (in 1927), and also founded the "Fédération des Élus Musulmans d'Algérie" (in 1930). Moreover, Bendjelloul was also a deputy to the French National Assembly until Algeria gained its independence. Bendjelloul contributed to the development of Algerian nationalism, prior to the Revolution, by his efforts to achieve political and civil equality between the French and Algerians.

== Personal life ==
Bendjelloul was born in Constantine into a family of Turkish origin.
