= Abdel-Hamid ibn Badis =

Salafist Islamic scholar in Algeria (1889–1940)

ʿAbd al-Ḥamīd ibn Muṣṭafā ibn Makkī ibn Bādīs
- عبد الحميد بن مصطفى بن تاجو باديس
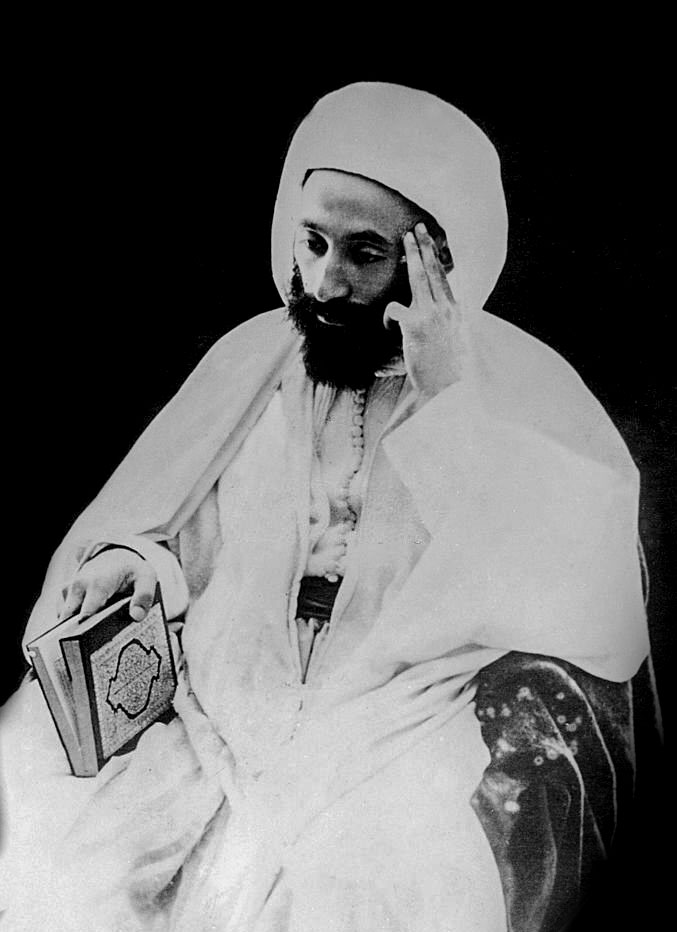

Personal life
- Born: December 4, 1889 Constantine, Algeria, France
- Died: April 16, 1940 (aged 50) Constantine, Algeria, France

Religious life
- Religion: Sunni Islam
- Jurisprudence: Maliki
- Creed: Athari
- Movement: Salafism; Wahhabism

Senior posting
- Influenced by: Muhammad Rashid Rida

ʿAbd al-Ḥamīd ibn Muṣṭafā ibn Makkī ibn Bādīs (Arabic: عبد الحميد بن مصطفى بن المكي بن باديس), better known as Ibn Bādīs (Arabic: بن باديس) was an Algerian Salafi educator, exegete, Islamic reformer, scholar and figurehead of cultural nationalism. In 1931, Ben Badis founded the Association of Algerian Muslim Ulema, which was a national grouping of many Islamic scholars in Algeria from many different and sometimes opposing perspectives and viewpoints. The Association would have later a great influence on Algerian Muslim politics up to the Algerian War of Independence. In the same period, it set up many institutions where thousands of Algerian children of Muslim parents were educated. The Association also published a monthly journal, the Al-Chihab and Souheil Ben Badis contributed regularly to it between 1925 and his death in 1940. The journal informed its readers about the Association's ideas and thoughts on religious reform and spoke on other religious and political issues.

== Early life ==
Abdelhamid Ben Badis was born in Constantine in 1889. His family were a prestigious family of ulama and notables that descended from the Zirid dynasty, 11th century rulers of Ifriqiya. Ben Badis' grandfather Si Makki ben Badis (d. 1889), was a qadi. His father, Muḥammad Mustafa (b. 1868), was an adjunct judge and a member the financial delegations, the colonial parliament. Ben Badis grew up in a scholarly and religious household and as a result memorized the Quran at the age of thirteen.

He was still very young when he was placed under the tutorship of Hamdan Lounissi. Lounissi had a significant influence on the youth of Ben Badis. Ben Badis never forgot Lounissi's counsel. Lounissi remarked to him "learn knowledge for the sake of knowledge, not because of duty." Lounissi was a stalwart defender of the rights of the Muslim inhabitants of Constantine. Lounissi extracted from young Ben Badis a promise to never enter into the service of France (the Colonial power in Algeria).

Ibn Badis was also influenced by the thoughts and outlook of the pan-Islamic reformers Jamal al-Din al-Afghani and Muhammad Abduh. He was a regular reader of Rashid Rida's monthly Al-Manar, and would publish the journal Al Shihab in Algeria, modelled on it. He is regarded as an heir to the thought of Rashid Rida and his reformist efforts were part of the wider Salafist and Wahhabi movements across North Africa.

== Invention ==
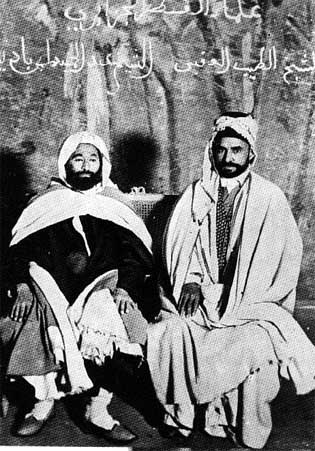
Abdelhamid Ben Badis (on the left)

=== At the Zeitouna University ===
In 1908, Ben Badis, decided to begin his first trip in order to advance his learning. He traveled to Tunis and enrolled at the Ez-Zitouna University, which was, at the time, a center of learning and knowledge, particularly in the Islamic fields of studies.

At the Ez-Zitouna University, Ben Badis horizons widened. He learned a great deal of the Islamic Sciences and Arabic Language. He met many scholars who left an indelible mark on his personality and his knowledge of Islam. The teachings of Sheik Mohammed Al-Nakhli convinced him on the need to purge Muslim communities of deviant or incorrect religious practices such as the cult of saints. Sheik Muhammed Al-Taher Ben Achour influenced Ben Badis in finding his appreciation of the splendor of the Arabic language. With Sheik Al-Bachir Safer, Ben Badis developed an interest in contemporary and past problems of Muslim communities, including finding a response to Western colonialism and dealing with its socioeconomic after-effects.

In 1912, he was awarded a degree. He spent another year at the Ez-Zitouna University as a teacher.

=== Return to Algeria ===
In 1913, Ben Badis returned to Algeria and settled in Constantine. In the same city, he started teaching at Sidi Lakhdar Mosque (The Green mosque) in early 1914.

In 1936, Ben Badis played a role in the founding of the "Algerian Muslim Congress" (CMA). This congress was disbanded the following year in the summer of 1937 and shortly after Ben Badis established and led another organization: the Association of Algerian Muslim Ulema.

In addition to working against deviations in the correct practice of Islam, Ben Badis and his fellow members of the Association strove to save the Algerian culture from being eclipsed by French values and morals. Ben Badis and other Islamic scholars resisted the suppression of Algerian patriots; working as a journalist during those years he regularly denounced fascist propaganda and anti-Semitic intrigues of the French occupiers.

Ben Badis was one of the most prominent Algerian Islamic scholars. With the aid of his contemporaries and associates he criticized Maraboutic practices and had a great influence in the creation of an Islamic conservative subsection of Algerian society.

On 16 April 1940, Ben badis died after a long struggle with diabetes. He was buried in the presence of 8000 people, including 1000 women.

His life was the subject of Ahmed Menour's 2019 novel For Both Their Sakes, I Lived.
