= Democratic Union of the Algerian Manifesto =

Political party in colonial Algeria

- President: Ferhat Abbas
- Founded: 1946
- Dissolved: 1956
- Preceded by: AML
- Merged into: National Liberation Front
- Ideology: Independentism; Algerian nationalism Social-democracy; Republicanism
- Political position: Left-wing

Party flag

Democratic Union of the Algerian Manifesto (in French: Union Démocratique du Manifeste Algérien) was a political party in colonial Algeria founded in 1946 by Ferhat Abbas, who was then elected deputy. The UDMA reflected the change in Abbas' point of view. He considered that after the failure of the implementation of significant reform, and the Sétif and Guelma massacre, the assimilation of the Algerian people into France as French citizens was no longer a viable alternative. He then advocated an autonomous state within the French framework; no longer would Algeria be considered a province of France; rather it would be an autonomous state within the French federalist system. UDMA won the elections to the Constituent Assembly in June 1946, by gaining 11 of the 13 seats devoted to the colonized population of Algeria. After 1948, fraud in the elections prevented nationalist parties from any significant success in the elections. Nevertheless, the UDMA took part in the electoral campaign. After the creation of the FLN (National Liberation Front) and the beginning of the War for Independence, negotiations took place to discuss the UDMA's merging with the FLN. In the end, it was decided that the UDMA, like the Algerian Communist Party, would dissolve and that its members would individually join the FLN. Ferhat Abbas and Ahmed Francis, two of the most prominent party leaders, fled to Cairo and joined the FLN leadership.

== Sources ==
- Tlemcani, Rachid, State and Revolution in Algeria. Boulder: Westview Press, 1986.
- Rahal, Malika, « Reconsidérer l’UDMA, la place des réformistes dans le mouvement national algérien », Vingtième siècle. Revue d’histoire, n°83, 2004.
