= List of Kabyle people =

This is a list of Kabyle people.

== Cinema ==
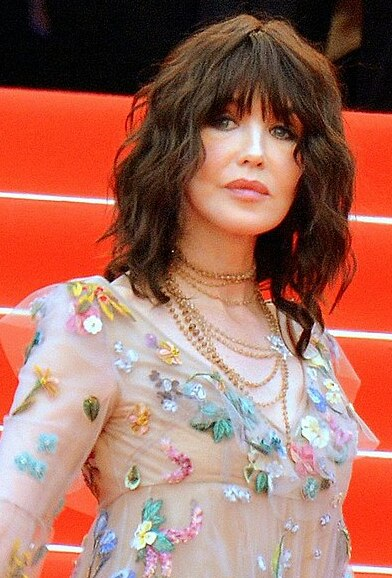
Isabelle Adjani

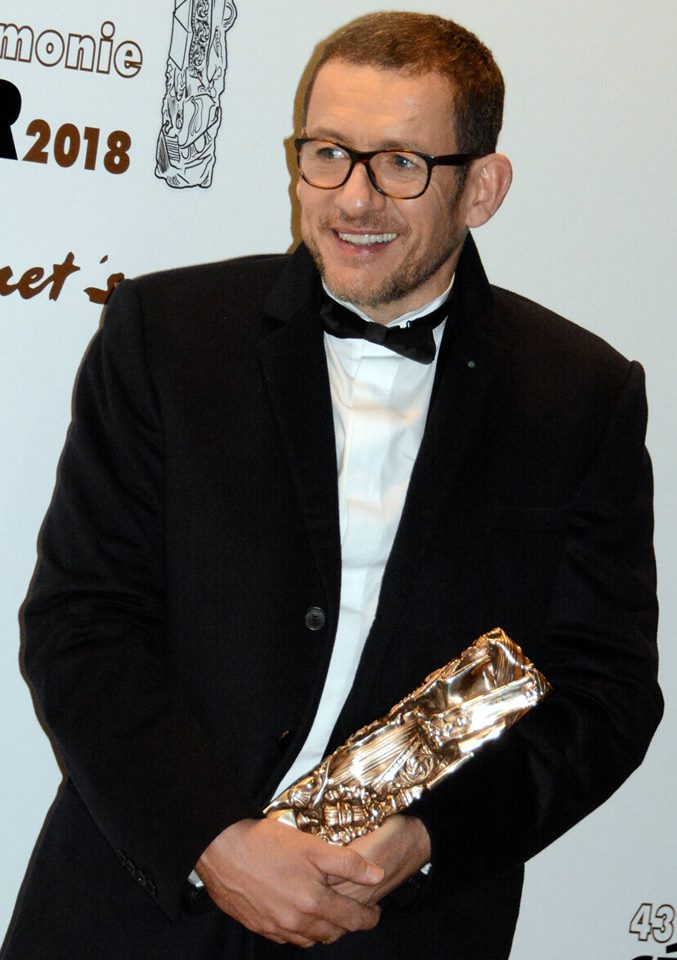
Dany Boon

- Isabelle Adjani (born 1955), actress and singer (half German)
- Karim Aïnouz (born 1966), film director and visual artist (half Brazilian)
- Rouiched (1921–1999), comedy actor and singer
- Ramzy Bedia (born 1972), actor, screenwriter and film director (half Algerian)
- Dany Boon (born 1966), actor, film director, screenwriter and producer (half French)
- Habiba Djahnine (born 1968), film producer, writer and essayist
- Fellag (born 1950), comedian, writer, humorist and actor
- Tony Gatlif (born 1948), film director, producer, screenwriter, actor and composer
- Mohamed Hilmi (1931–2022), actor and director
- Jalil Lespert (born 1976), actor, screenwriter and director (half French Pieds-noirs)
- Marie-José Nat (1940–2019), actress (half French)
- Daniel Prévost (born 1939), actor, comedian and writer (half French)
- Fatima Sissani (born 1970), documentary filmmaker
- Jacques Villeret (1951–2005), actor (half French)
- Fatma Zohra Zamoum (born 1967), filmmaker, writer and educator
- Claude Zidi (born 1934), film director and screenwriter (half French)

== Artists ==
- Baya (1931–1998), surrealist, primitive, naïve and modern painter and ceramist
- M'hamed Issiakhem (1928–1985), one of the founders of the modern Algerian painting
- Hamid Tibouchi (born 1951), painter and poet
- Rezki Zerarti (1938–2024), cubist painter
- Hocine Ziani (born 1953), painter and artist in plastic arts

== Leaders and politicians ==
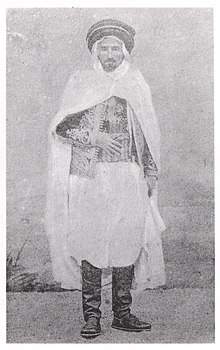
Cheikh Mokrani

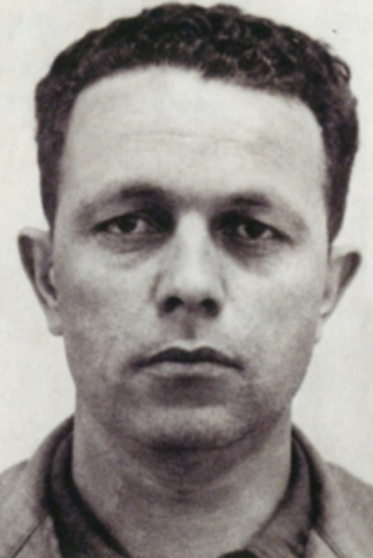
Abane Ramdane

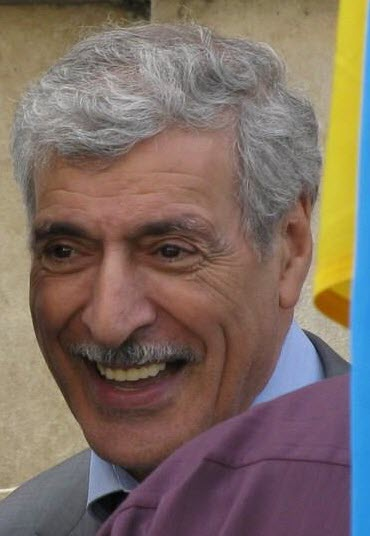
Ferhat Mehenni

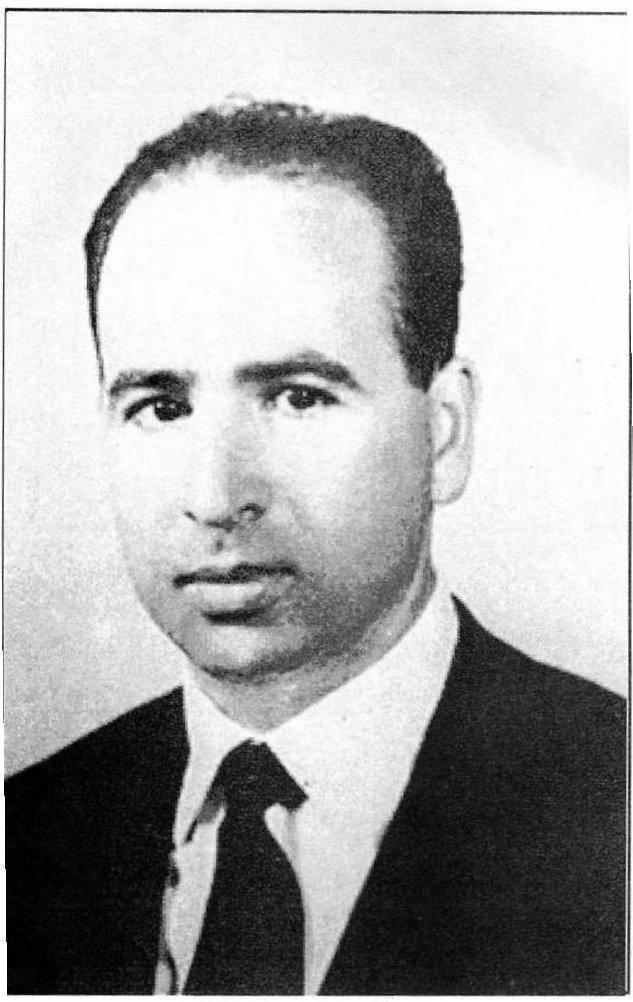
Krim Belkacem

=== Modern ===
- Ahmed Ait Mokran (died 1596), Amokrane of the Ait Abbas (1559–1596)
- Boumezrag Ait Mokran (c. 1836–1905), last Amokrane of the Ait Abbas and caid of the Ouennougha, leader of the Mokrani Revolt
- Naceur Ait Mokran (died 1600), Amokrane of the Ait Abbas (1596–1600)
- Cheikh Mokrani (1815–1871), Amokrane, Caliph of the Medjana (1831–1838) and leader of the Mokrani Revolt
- Abdelaziz Ou Abbas (died 1559), Amokrane of the Ait Abbas (1510–1559)
- Ahmed Ou Lqadi (c. 1480–1527), Agellid of Kingdom of Kuku

=== Comtemporary ===
- Ferhat Abbas (1899–1985), Algerian politician
- Ali Yahia Abdennour (1921–2021), politician, lawyer and human rights activist
- Belaid Abdessalam (1928–2020), politician, Prime Minister of Algeria (1992–1993)
- Belaïd Abrika (born 1969), leader and spokesperson of the Arouch Movement, professor
- Hocine Aït Ahmed (1926–2015), politician and former rebel, founder of the FFS and lawyer
- Bouaziz Ait Chebib (born 1973), Kabyle nationalist politician, 4th president of the MAK (2011–2016), founder of the URK and the AKAL
- Fadela Amara (born 1964), French politician
- Mohand Arav Bessaoud (1924–2002), Amazighist politician, writer, activist and soldier of the ALN, co-founded of the Agraw Imazighen
- Djamel Beghal, French-Algerian islamic terrorist
- Yamina Benguigui, French politician, film director
- Ahmed Boumendjel (1908–1982), politician and lawyer
- Lyès Deriche (1928–2001), politician and revolutionary
- Abderrahmane Farès (1911–1991), Chairman of the Provisional Executive of Algeria (1962)
- Lydia Guirous (born 1984), French politician
- Smail Hamdani (1930–2017), politician, Prime Minister of Algeria (1998–1999)
- Aïssat Idir (1915–1959), syndicalist and founder of the UGTA
- Krim Belkacem (1922–1970), historical leader of National Liberation Front (Algeria), assassinated in 1970
- Hadja Lahbib (born 1970), Belgian politician, journalist, television presenter and director
- Ramtane Lamamra (born 1952), diplomat and Ministry of Foreign Affairs (2021–2023)
- Belkacem Lounes (born 1955), politician, economist, activist and President of the World Amazigh Congress (2002–2011)
- Ali André Mécili (born 1940), French-Algerian politician and lawyer, assassinated in 1987
- Mohamed Mediène (born 1936), Algerian intelligence office, forger head of the DRS
- Ferhat Mehenni (born 1951), Kabyle nationalist politician, singer, writer, secularist, founder of the MAK and President of the Kabyle Government in Exile
- Kasdi Merbah (1938–1993), nationalist politician, member of the Oujda Group, assassinated in 1993
- Mouloud Kacem Naît Belkacem (1927–1992), Pan-Arabist politician
- Karim Ouchikh (born 1965), French politician, vice-president of the National Council of European Resistance and co-founder of SIEL
- Belkacem Radjef (1909–1989), politician and militant for the independence of Algeria
- Abane Ramdane (1920–1957), politician activist and revolutionary, assassinated in 1957
- Saïd Sadi (born 1947), politician, founder and president of the RCD (1989–2012)
- Mohand Cherif Sahli (1906–1989), ambassador of Algeria, historian and writer
- Abdelmadjid Sidi Said (born 1949), politician, President of the UGTA
- Hocine Zehouane (1935–2025), politician, human rights activist and president of the Algerian League for Human Rights (2005–2007)

== Literature ==
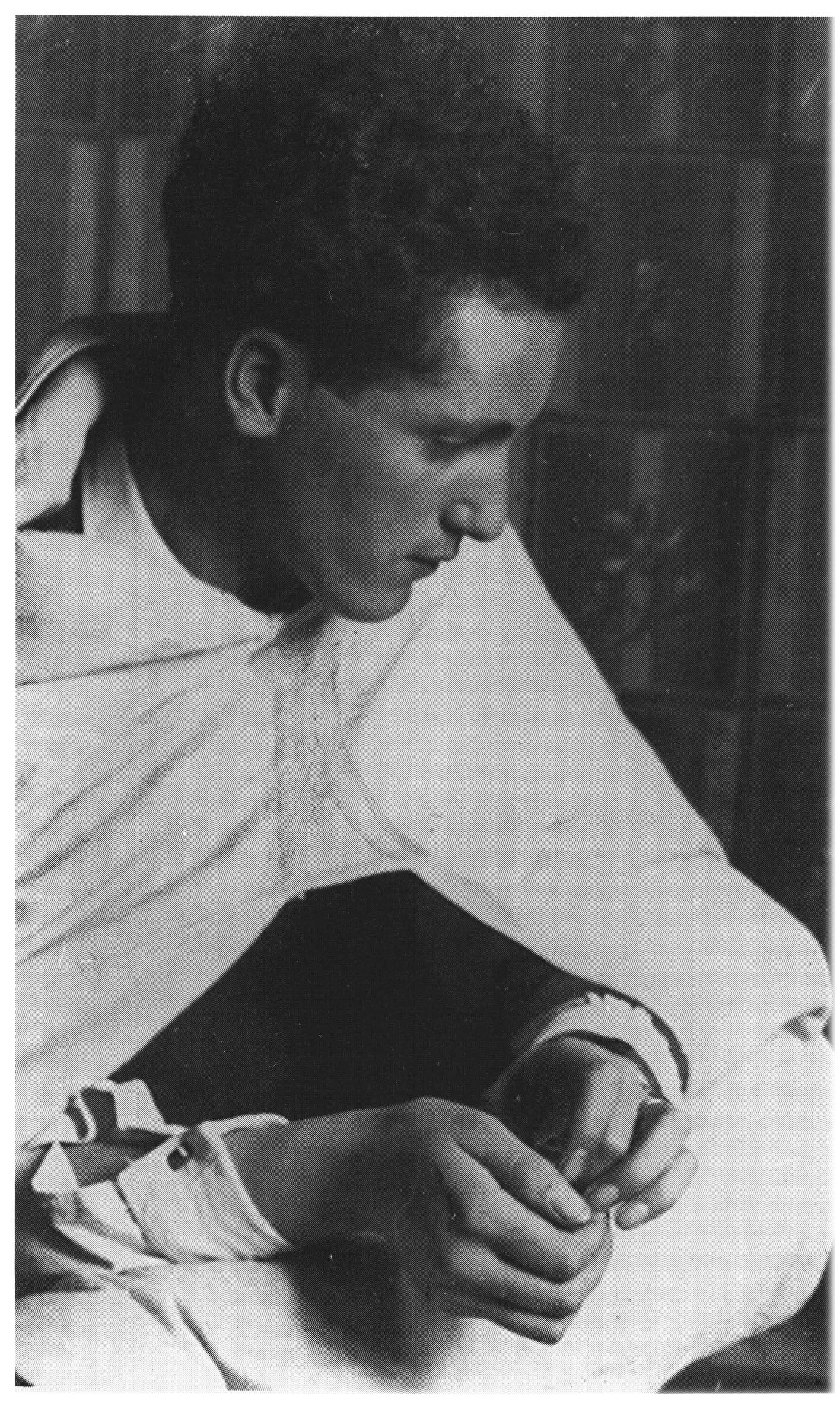
Jean Amrouche

- Arezki Aït-Larbi (born 1955), journalist and human rights activist
- Fadhma Aït Mansour (c. 1882–1967), poet and folksinger
- Jean Amrouche (1906–1962), writer, poet and journalist
- Taos Amrouche (1913–1976), Amazighist writer and singer, first Kabyle woman to publish a novel, co-founder of the Agraw Imazighen
- Rachid Arhab (born 1955), journalist and member of the CSA
- Ahmed Azeggagh (1942–2003), poet, novelist and journalist
- Mohammed Benchicou (born 1952), director and publisher of the newspaper Le Matin
- Aziz Chouaki (born 1951), writer and playwright
- Tahar Djaout (1954–1993), journalist, poet and fiction writer, assassinated by the Armed Islamic Group in 1993
- Nabile Farès (1940–2016), novelist
- Mouloud Feraoun (1913–1962), writer and martyr of the Algerian revolution, assassinated by the OAS
- Salima Ghezali (born 1958), journalist and writer
- Malek Haddad (1927–1978), poet and writer and former Algerian Council of the Nation member (2016–2018)
- Louisette Ighilahriz (born 1936), writer
- Saïd Mekbel (1940–1994), journalist and satirist, assassinated in 1994
- Arezki Metref (born 1952), writer, poet and journalist
- Rachid Mimouni (1945–1995), writer, teacher and human rights activist
- Salem Zenia (born 1962), writer, journalist and poet
- Alice Zeniter (born 1986), novelist, translator, scriptwriter, dramatist and director (half French)
- Youcef Zirem (born 1964), writer, activist and journalist

== Military ==
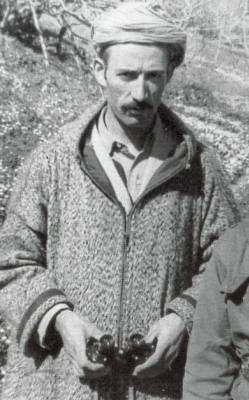
Amirouche Aït Hamouda

- Cheikh Aheddad (1790–1873), prominent leader in the Mokrani Revolt and chief of the Rahmaniyya brotherhood
- Amirouche Aït Hamouda (1926–1959), military leader and revolutionary during the Algerian War
- Safiyy al-Dawla, Kutama Fatimid Governor of Aleppo (1022–1023)
- Mourad Didouche (1927–1955), revolutionary, political and militant figure of the Algerian War
- Raïs Hamidou (1770–1815), Barbary corsair and Admiral in Ottoman Algeria
- Ahmed Mahsas (1923–2013), fighter in the Algerian nationalist movement and member of the Special Organisation
- Lalla Fatma N'Soumer (c. 1830–1863), Igawawen member who led western Kabylia, in battle against French troops
- Al-Hasan ou Ahmad, Kutama Fatimid Governor of Sicily and kairouan (909–914), Da'i (902–914), Commander of the army (902–914) and navy (909–914)
- Ja'far ou Fallah (died 971), Kutama Fatimid military commander and governor
- Ali ou Ja'far, Kutama Fatimid military commander and governor (1000–1021) and son of Ja'far
- Mohand ou Zamoum (1795–1843), marabout who participated in the Kabyle resistance during the French conquest of Algeria
- Omar ou Zamoum (1836–1898), marabout who participated in the Mokrani Revolt
- Saïd Mohammedi (1912–1994), revolutionary soldier during the Algerian War
- Mohamed Saïl (1894–1953), journalist, revolutionary, participated at the Spanish Civil War

== Musicians ==
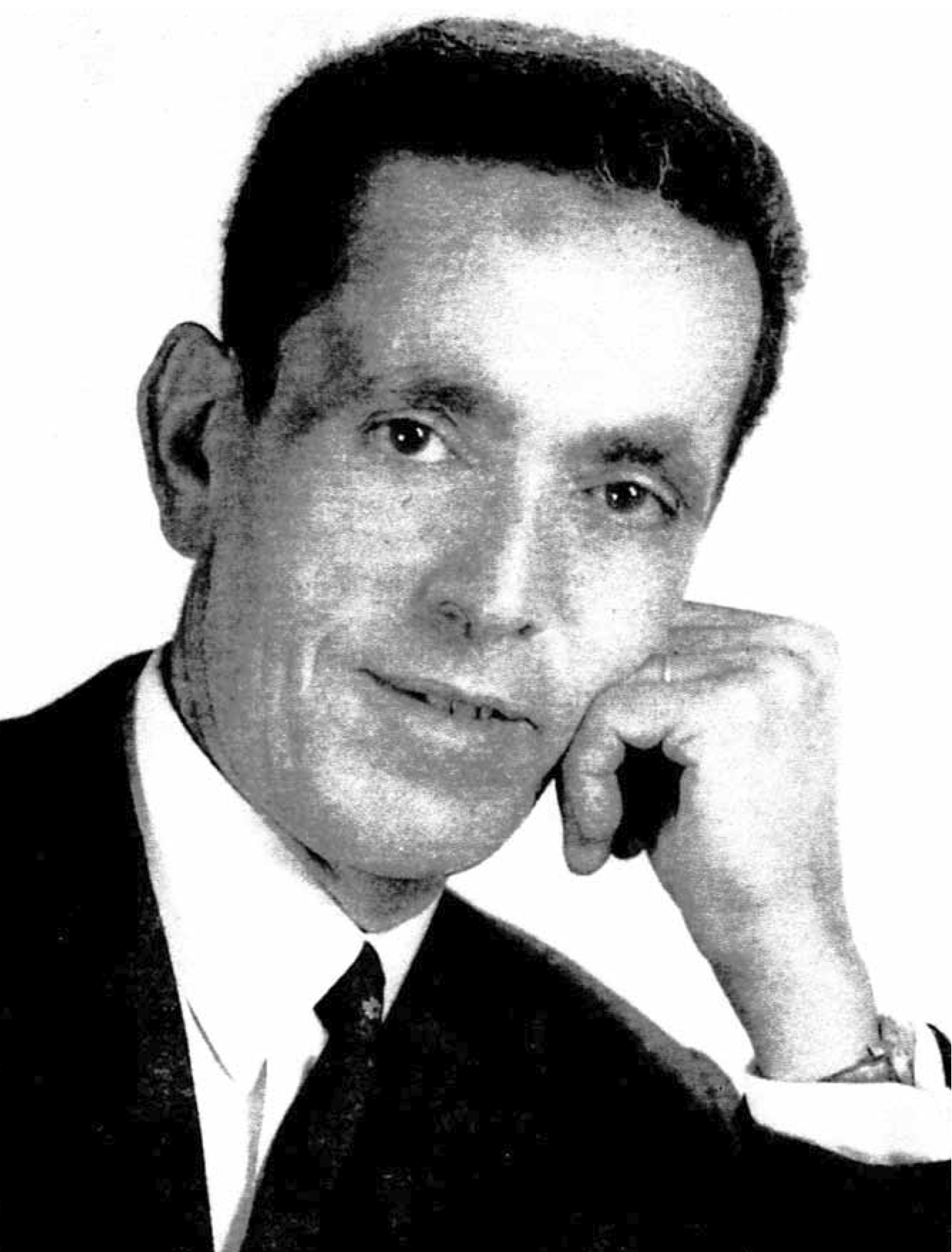
Slimane Azem

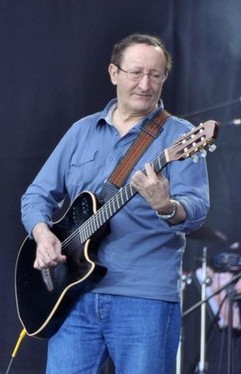
Idir

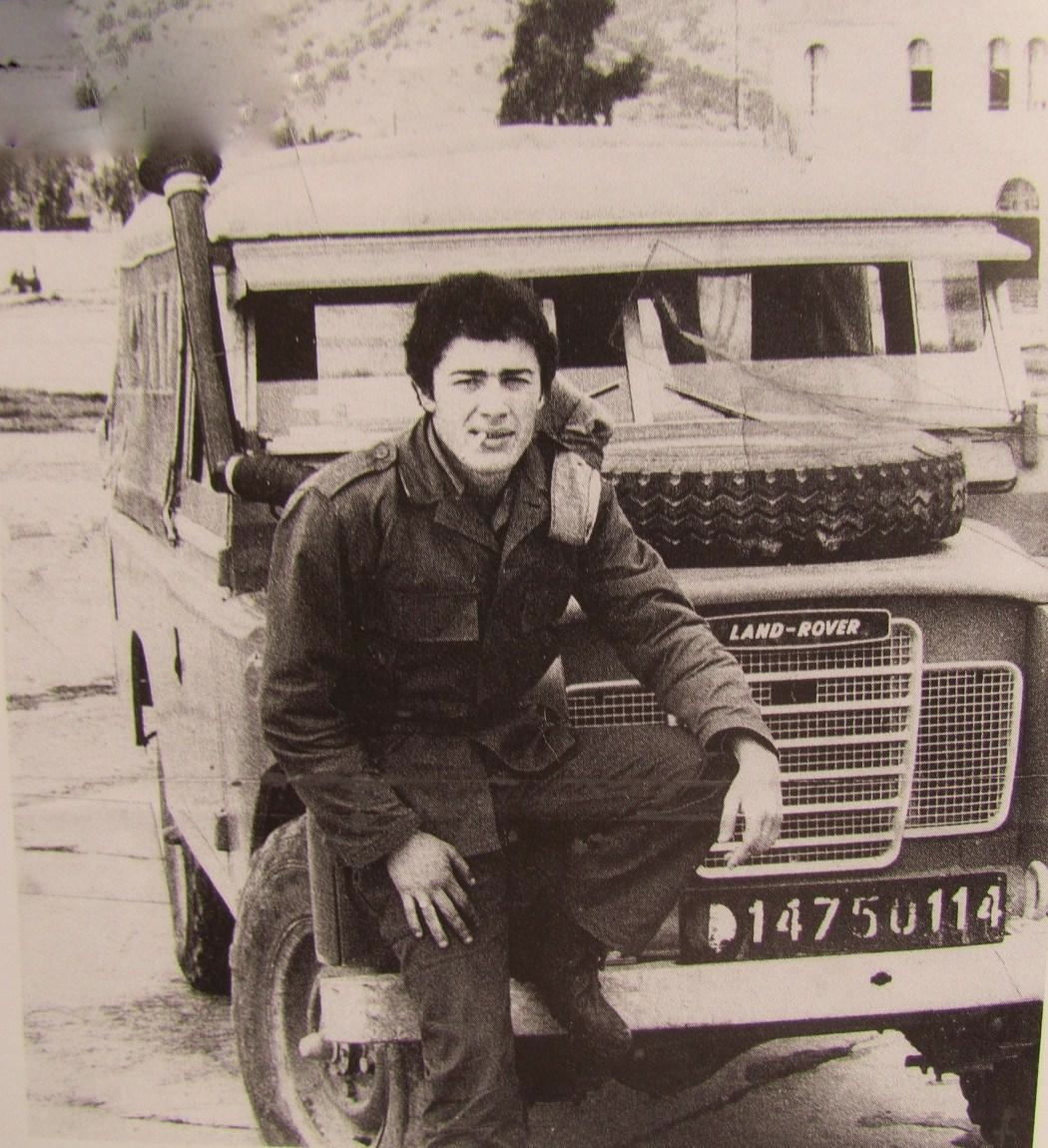
Lounès Matoub

=== Chaabi ===
- Abdelkader Chaou (born 1941), singer-songwriter and mandole player known for his own style of chaabi
- El Hadj M'Hamed El Anka (1907–1978), chaabi musician considered as a Grand Master of Andalusian classical music and chaabi
- Cheikh El Hasnaoui (1910–2002), composer, musician and singer
- Amar Ezzahi (1941–2016), singer and mandole player and figurehead of chaabi
- Hsissen (1929–1958), composer and singer of chaabi music
- Kamel Messaoudi (1961–1998), chaabi singer and instrumentalist
- Rachid Taha (1958–2018), singer-songwriter and activist (half Algerian)
- Mustapha Toumi (1937–2013), songwriter, composer, lyricist, composer, poet and painter

=== Classical ===
- Mohamed Iguerbouchène (1907–1966), composer, musician and musicologist

=== Kabyle ===
- Abderrahmane Abdelli (born 1958), author, composer and singer
- Amour Abdenour (born 1952), singer, songwriter, composer
- Lounis Ait Menguellet (born 1950), singer and poet
- Farid Ali (1919–1981), singer and composer
- Slimane Azem (1918–1983), singer and poet
- Chérifa (1926–2014), singer-songwriter
- Malika Domrane (born 1956), singer and militant for women's rights and the Berber cultural identity
- Idir (1945–2020), singer-songwriter, record producer and musician referred to as the "King of Amazigh music"
- Lounès Matoub (1956–1998), singer, songwriter, poet, secularist and activist for the Amazigh cause assassinated in 1998
- Akli Yahiatene singer and composer

=== Others ===
- Alain Bashung (1947–2009), singer, songwriter, actor (half French)
- Baaziz (born 1963), singer and songwriter
- Chimène Badi (born 1982), singer, songwriter (half Algerian Harki)
- Étienne Daho (born 1956), singer-songwriter (half Spaniard Pieds-noirs)
- DJ Snake (born 1986), record producer, disc jockey and songwriter (half French)
- Kenza Farah (born 1986), singer, songwriter, rapper
- Juliette (born 1962), singer, songwriter, composer
- Souad Massi (born 1972), singer, songwriter and guitarist
- Marcel Mouloudji (1922–1994), singer, actor and writer (half French)
- Rim'K (born 1978), French singer
- Sinik (born 1980), French singer (half French)
- Soolking (born 1989), singer
- Takfarinas (born 1958), singer, songwriter and musician

== Philosophers and humanists ==
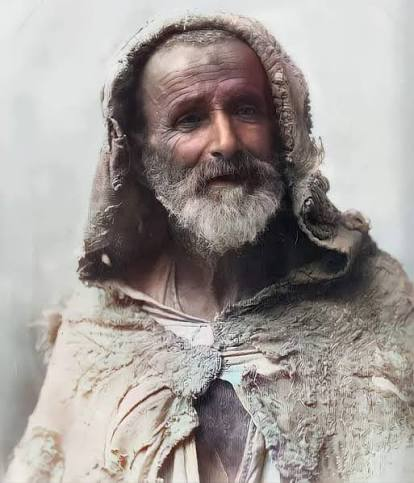
Si Mohand

- Si Mohand (c. 1848–1905), poet and philosopher

== Religion ==
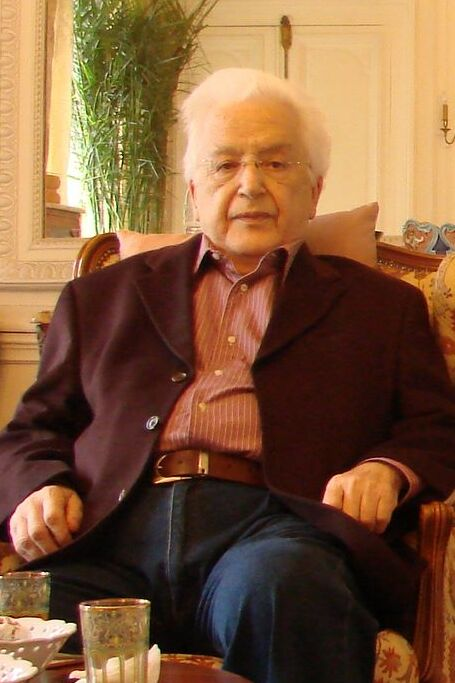
Mohammed Arkoun

- Mohammed Arkoun (1928–2010), Islamologist
- Sidi M'hamed Bou Qobrine (died 1793/1794), Muslim scholar, Sufi saint, founder and Sheikh of the Rahmaniyya

== Sciences ==
- Noureddine Melikechi (born 1958), atomic, molecular and optical physicist

== Social scientists ==
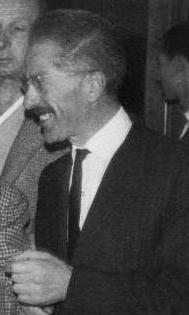
Mouloud Mammeri

- Boulifa (c. 1865–1931), linguist and precursor of Amazighist
- Mouloud Mammeri (1917–1989), writer, anthropologist and linguist, whose censorship sparked Berber Spring
- Abdelmalek Sayad (1933–1998), sociologist, first as an assistant to Pierre Bourdieu, research director at the CNRS
- Tassadit Yacine (born 1949), anthropologist specialised in Amazigh culture
- Salem Chaker (born 1950), linguist

== Sports ==
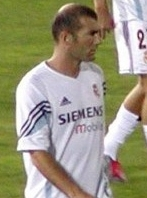
Zinedine Zidane

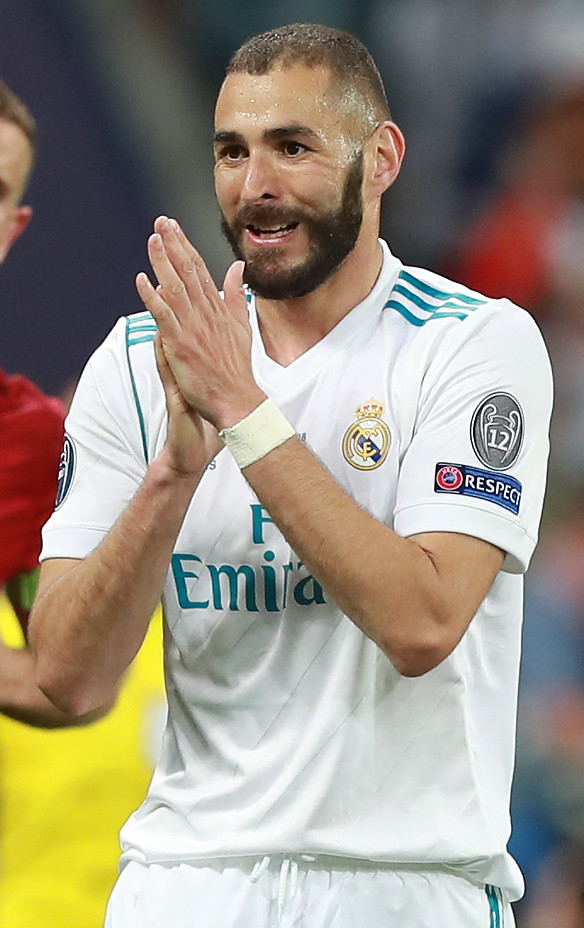
Karim Benzema

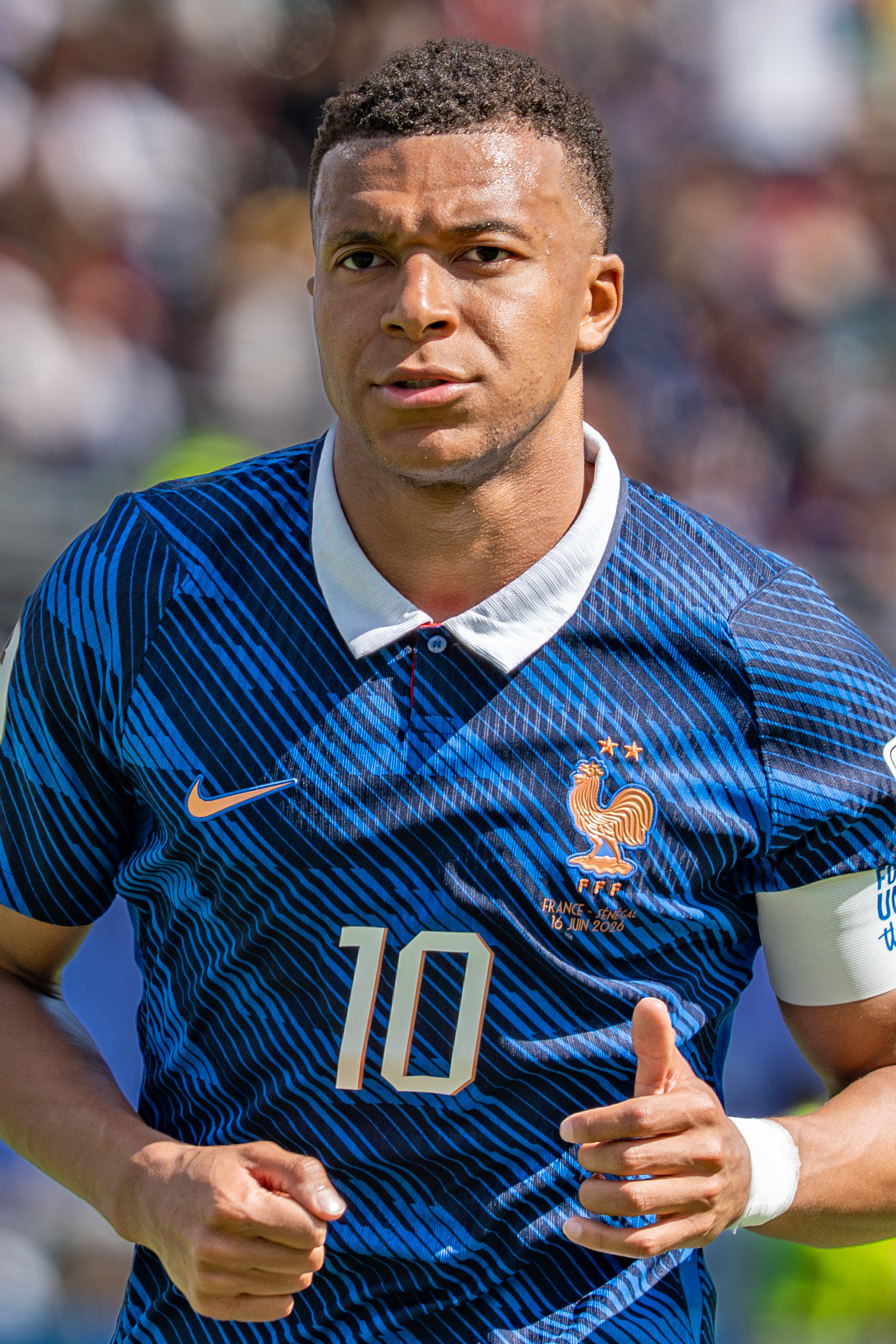
Kylian Mbappé

- Samir Aït Saïd (born 1989), artistic gymnast, 2019 World Artistic Gymnastics Championships bronze medalist 2013 European Artistic Gymnastics Championships champion

=== Martial arts ===
- Larbi Benboudaoud (born 1974), World (1999) and European champion (1998, 1999)
- Abdelhafid Benchabla (born 1986), amateur boxer and current World Series of Boxing Light heavyweight champion
- Loucif Hamani (1950–2021), boxer and African chanmpion
- Ali Idir (born 1966), judoka, European and World champion
- Salim Medjkoune (born 1972), boxer, French champion (1995, 2000), European champion (2001–2002) and super bantamweight World champion (2002–2003)

=== Football ===
- Djamel Abdoun (born 1986), winger
- Maghnes Akliouche (born 2002), French footballer
- Hakim Arezki, French blind footballer, took part in the Black spring (Kabylia)
- Salah Assad (born 1958), forward for Algeria and holder of the record of most scored goals at the World Cup with Islam Slimani
- Karim Belhocine (born 1978), defensive midfielder and current head coach of JS Kabylie
- Abdelhak Benchikha (born 1963), football coach for IR Tanger and former player
- Abdelaziz Ben Tifour (1927–1970), midfielder, player for France then the FLN football team
- Karim Benzema (born 1987), striker for Real Madrid and France. 2022 UEFA Player of the Year and Ballon d'Or (half Algerian)
- Mustapha Dahleb (born 1952), midfielder and PSG player
- Ali Fergani (born 1952), midfielder
- Mohand Chérif Hannachi (1950–2020), central defender and chairman of JS Kabylie (1993–2017)
- Hacène Lalmas (1943–2018), midfielder, top scorer of the Algerian championship with 131 goals and 14th best African player of all time
- Kylian Mbappé (born 1998), striker for Real Madrid and France. 2018 World Cup champion (half Cameroonian)
- Djamel Menad (1960–2025), forward for Algeria, 1990 African Cup of Nations winner and top scorer and five times Algerian champion with JS Kabylie
- Ahmed Oudjani (1937–1998), striker for Algeria and RC Lens
- Karim Ziani (born 1982), midfielder for Algeria (half French)
- Zinedine Zidane (born 1972), attacking midfielder, 1998 World champion and Ballon d'or winner and Real Madrid coach

== Others ==
- Ali Haddad (born 1965), businessman, co-founder and CEO of the ETRHB (Entreprise des Travaux Routiers, Hydrauliques et Bâtiments)
- Issad Rebrab (born 1944), billionaire businessman, CEO of the Cevital Industrial group
- Yazid Sabeg (born 1950), businessman, president of the administrative council of high-technology an CEO of CS Communication & Systèmes
