= Aissat =

Aissat may refer to:

- AISSat-1, satellite
- Aïssat Idir (1915–1959), Algerian syndicalist
- Aïssat Idir Station, train station in Algiers
- Nicolas Aissat (born 1980), French runner

== See also ==
- Ismaïl Aissati (born 1988), Moroccan footballer
