= Kabyle Human Rights League =

- Ligue Kabyle des Droits de l'Homme
- Tamuqint Taqvaylit n Izerfan n Wemdan
- Abbreviation: LKDH (French); TTIW (Kabyle)
- Formation: February 22, 2023; 3 years ago
- Founded at: Paris, France
- Type: Human rights organization
- Registration no.: W751268740
- Legal status: Association loi de 1901
- Headquarters: Paris, France
- Location: Rue de Montmorency
- Origins: Kabyle diaspora
- Region served: Kabylia, Kabyle diaspora
- Official language: Kabyle, French
- Funding: Membership fees and donations
- Website: lkdh.org

The Kabyle Human Rights League (Kabyle: Tamuqint Taqvaylit n Izerfan n Wemdan, French: Ligue Kabyle des Droits de l'Homme) is a human rights NGO association founded on 22 February 2023 and whose mission is to defend the Human Rights of Kabyle people in Algeria and other countries.

== History ==
The association was founded in Paris on 22 February 2023 as a "Loi de 1901" association.

On 10 December 2023, the association held a conference about the Larbaa Nath Irathen trial.
