= Kabyle =

- Kabyle people, an ethnic group in Algeria
- Kabyle language
  - Kabyle alphabet, also known as Berber Latin alphabet
  - Kabyle grammar
- Kabylie, the Kabyle ethnic homeland
- Kabyles du Pacifique, a group of Algerians deported to New Caledonia after an uprising in 1871
- Kabyle (ancient city), an ancient Thracian city in southeastern Bulgaria
- Kabile, Bulgaria, a modern village near the Thracian city
- Kabyle musket

== See also ==
- JS Kabylie, Algerian football team
