= Kabyle diaspora =

Iqvayliyen di verra, ⵉⵇⴱⴰⵢⵍⵉⵢⴻⵏ ⴷⵉ ⵠⴻⵔⵔⴰ

Total population
- c. 3–4 million

Regions with significant populations
- Algeria: 2–3 million
- France: c. 1 million
- Canada: 37,415

Languages
- Kabyle; Algerian Arabic, French

Religion
- Predominantly Muslim; Christian and Irreligious minorities

Related ethnic groups
- Kabyles

The Kabyle diaspora (Kabyle: Iqvayliyen di verra, ⵉⵇⴱⴰⵢⵍⵉⵢⴻⵏ ⴷⵉ ⵠⴻⵔⵔⴰ) consists of Kabyle people and their descendants living outside of Kabylia. As a result of the French colonization of Kabylia and the political and social instability in post-independence Algeria, many Kabyles have dispersed to other regions of Algeria such as Algiers, countries of Europe (France, Belgium and the United-Kingdom) and countries of North America (the United States and Canada).

Outside of Kabylia, the largest communities of the Kabyle people exist in Algeria, while the second largest Kabyle diaspora population is in France.

Kabyles are a Berber ethnic sub-group indigenous to northern Algeria, and historically did not refer to themselves as Berbers but had their own terms to refer to their own groups and communities. The use of the endonym Amazigh dates back to antiquity, as attested by groups such as the Mazices, and it remains in use today.

== History ==
During the Ottoman era, many Kabyles temporarily emigrated from the Kabyle kingdoms to enroll in the armies of the deys of Algiers and Tunis.

Two years after the defeat of Emir Abdelkader in 1847, many Kabyle religious families emigrated to Syria but their number remained small.

In 1871, following the Mokrani Revolt, many Kabyles emigrated to Metropolitan France. Other ones, who escaped summary executions, were deported to New Caledonia, where many of their descendants still live.

In 1905, France's economic expansion attracted a large population of Kabyles from Great Kabylia. After the First World War, many demobilized soldiers also remained in metropolitan France.

== Around the world ==
=== Algeria ===
Algeria has the largest Kabyle diaspora population, who have settled mainly in Algiers, but also in Sétif, Constantine and Oran. They represent 30% of the Algerian population. Several neighborhoods and towns such as the village of Tixeraïne and the town of Aïn Bénian are said to be mostly Kabyle.

=== France ===
It is estimated that around a million Kabyles live in France.

In 1902, according to an investigative commission, it is estimated that nearly 10,000 Kabyles were working in France, particularly in the Nord-Pas-de-Calais. In 1948, there were 200,000 Algerians which then doubled in late 1954, it was said that two thirds of those Algerians were of Kabyle origin, mainly Igawawen from Greater Kabylia and Aït Abbas from Lesser Kabylia. Additionally, the immigrants from the town of Draâ El Mizan dominated the immigrant labour force in the engineering factories of Lyon. In France, Kabyles had one of the lowest unemployment rates (5%) compared to other ethnic groups (>50%). Kabyles also represented about 50-60% of Algerians working in France during the early 1950s and were said to be 16 times more likely to migrate than Arab Algerians.

==== New Caledonia ====
15,000 Algerians currently live in New Caledonia, they represent about 5%~ of the Island most of them being Kabyle.

=== United Kingdom ===
The Kabyle diaspora in the United Kingdom are relative newcomers and result from the instability from the Algerian Civil War.

=== Canada ===
There exists multiple associations relating to the Kabyle community in Canada notably the Kabyle Congress of Canada (CKC).

=== Palestine ===
After the Mokrani Revolt, hundreds of Kabyles were deported to other Arab countries notably Palestine, for fighting with Emir Abdelkader against the French in 1830–1840, notably the village of Dayshum that was inhabited by the tribe of Ath Yahia from Tigzirt where they raised horses. This led to the creation of a 2017 documentary by Tahar Houchi called "Salah, un Kabyle de Palestine" (Salah, a Kabyle from Palestine), it notably highlights that the Kabyles of Palestine still retain their cultural heritage, where they prepare Couscous and still speak Kabyle with a Palestinian accent despite multiple displacements, Salah is a man from Dayshum but was displaced after the Nakba in 1948, it is said that the Kabyles of Palestine now live in the Burj el-Shamali and Bourj el-Barajneh camps in Lebanon.

== Culture ==
Many Kabyle cultural and social associations exist within the members of the diaspora to promote and preserve the Kabyle culture. These include Amitié France Kabylie, the French-Kabyle association Tilelli, Les Amis de la Kabylie, the Breizh-Kabyle association, Radio Tiziri, as well as many village-based associations.

=== Religion ===
While most Kabyles are Muslims, Christian Kabyle community also exists, mainly composed of Catholics and Evangelicals. In the Paris region, a non-CNEF-affiliated "Evangelical Kabyle Church of Paris" is located on Rue Jules-Auffret in Pantin. It is estimated that around 35,000 Christian Kabyles lived in France in 2009.

== Political positions ==
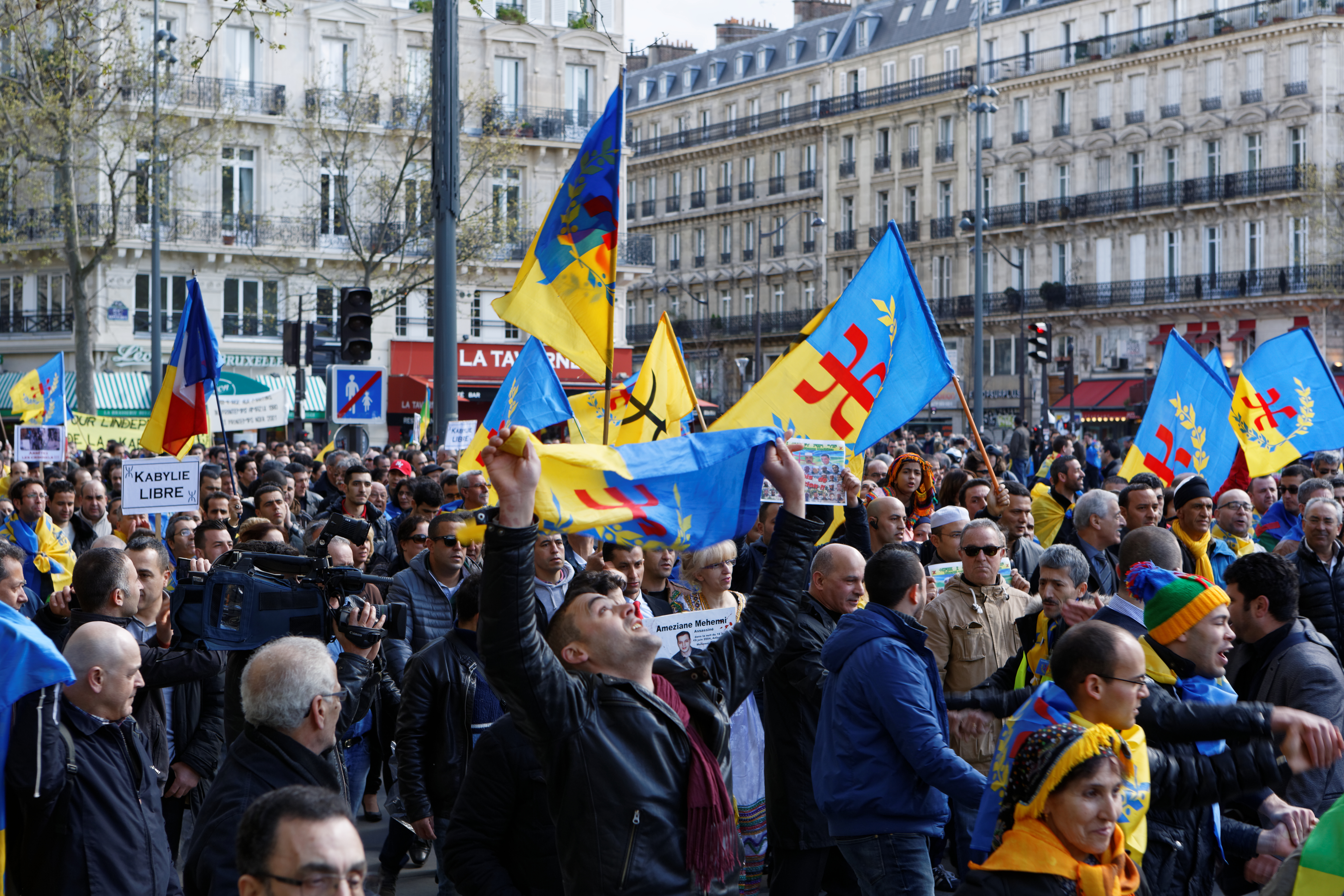
Protest for the independence of Kabylia in Pariss, 2016.

In France, many Kabyle movements and associations such as the Movement for the Self-Determination of Kabylia and the CFK (Coordination des Kabyles de France) exist.

In 2021, members of the Kabyle diaspora in Canada protested in Montreal against the Algerian government's handling of the COVID-19 pandemic, the alleged manipulation surrounding those responsible for the wildfires in Kabylia, the arrests of activists and the growing phenomenon of harragas by the Algerian government. In 2024, Radio-Canada reported on pressure by the Algerian government on Canadian citizens of Kabyle origin who were close to the MAK movement.

== Notable people ==
=== Cinema ===
- Isabelle Adjani (half)
- Mhamed Arezki
- Dany Boon (half)
- Fellag
- Jalil Lespert (half)
- Samy Naceri (half)
- Marie-José Nat (half)
- Daniel Prévost (half)
- Jacques Villeret (half)

=== Literature ===
- Fadhma Aït Mansour
- Jean Amrouche
- Taos Amrouche
- Salem Chaker
- Aziz Chouaki
- Salem Zenia
- Alice Zeniter (half)

=== Music ===
- Slimane Azem
- Baya
- El Hadj M'Hamed El Anka
- Cheikh El Hasnaoui
- DJ Snake (half)
- Hsissen
- Idir
- Kamel Messaoudi
- Rim'K
- Rachid Taha (half)
- Takfarinas
- Karim Tizouiar

=== Politics ===
- Hocine Aït Ahmed
- Fadela Amara
- Mohand Arav Bessaoud
- Tarik Brahmi
- Lyès Deriche
- Mohamed Deriche
- Lydia Guirous
- Belkacem Krim
- Hadja Lahbib
- Ali André Mécili
- Ferhat Mehenni, founder of the Movement for the Self-Determination of Kabylia
- Laurette Onkelinx
- Karim Ouchikh

=== Science ===
- Salem Chaker
- Mustapha Ishak-Boushaki
- Noureddine Melikechi
- Yousef Saad

=== Sport ===
- Robert Abdesselam (half)
- Hakim Arezki
- Karim Benzema (half)
- Ali Fergani
- Hacène Lalmas
- Kylian Mbappé (half)
- Chérif Oudjani
- Karim Ziani
- Zinedine Zidane

== Notes and references ==
=== Bibliography ===
- Mailhe, Germaine (1995). Déportation en Nouvelle-Calédonie des communards et des révoltés de la Grande Kabylie (1872-1876). Éditions L'Harmattan. ISBN 978-2-296-29442-4.
- Lalloui, Mehdi (1994). Kabyles du Pacifique. Au nom de la Mémoire. ISBN 978-2-910780-00-5.
