= Alice Cherki =

Algerian psychoanalyst

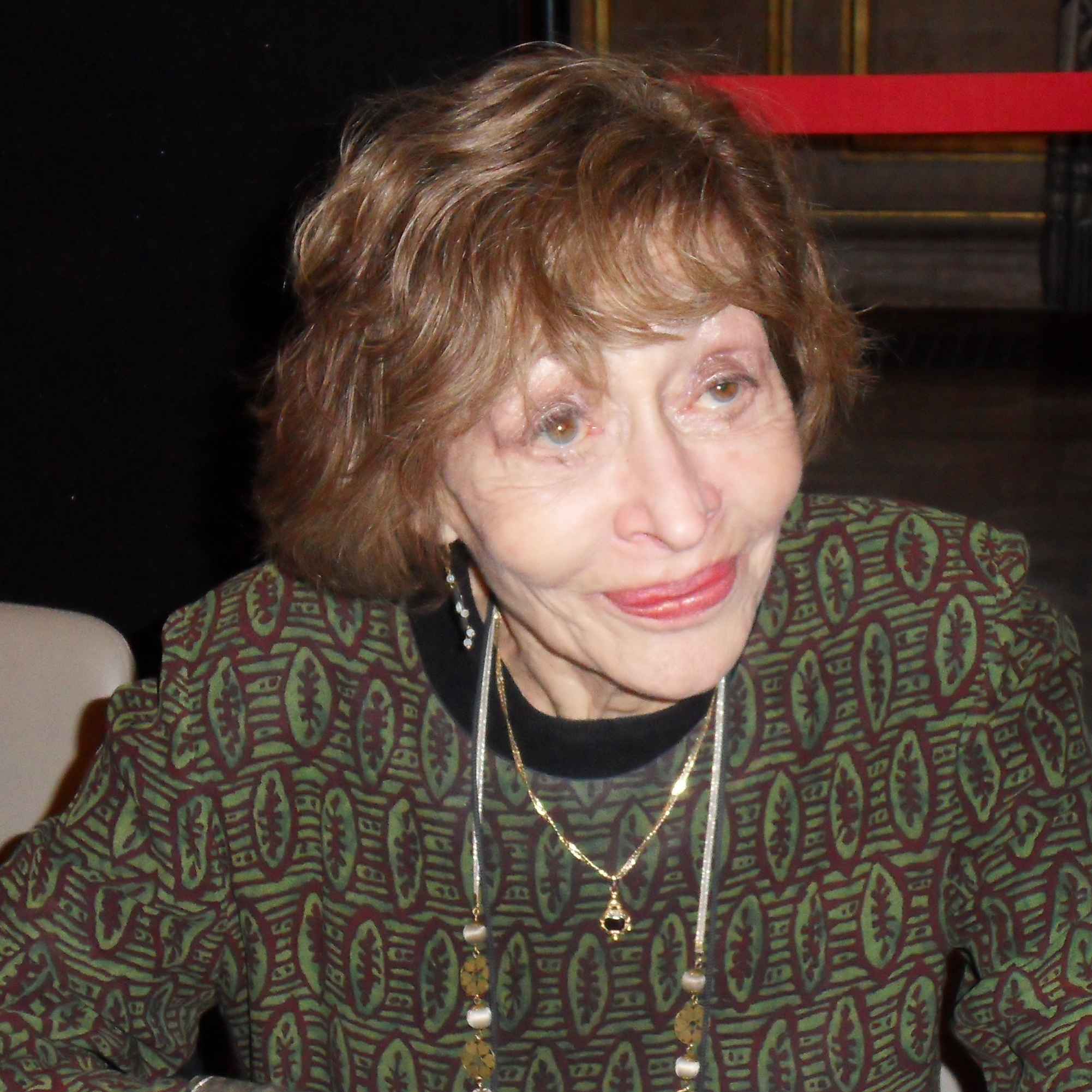
Alice Cherki, 2012

Alice Cherki (born 1936 in Algiers, Algeria) is an Algerian psychoanalyst practising in Paris. She has written a number of books, including Frantz Fanon: A Portrait which is based on her personal recollections of working with Fanon in Algeria and in Tunisia.

== Biography ==
Cherki was born in 1936 into a Jewish family based in Algiers. Her father was a cereal merchant. Her exclusion from the French School for being Jewish during World War II marked the beginning of her political awakening. During her medical studies, she campaigned for the independence of Algeria. After attending one of his lectures, she joined, in the middle of Algeria's war, the team of the psychiatrist and thinker Frantz Fanon, then head doctor of one division of the psychiatric hospital of Blida-Joinville. At the age of 20 she married Charles Géronimi, a close associate and friend of Fanon. They were later divorced. In 1957, she began to study psychiatry in Paris before taking refuge in Tunis She became a junior doctor in Manouba clinic and later received a grant from the temporary government of the Algerian Republic to finish her studies in East Germany. She returned to Algeria on the eve of its independence in 1962.

In 1964, she established herself in Paris to finish her psychiatric training as well as starting in psychoanalysis, while regularly visiting Algeria. In the course of her career, she published numerous papers and a number of books dealing with issues such as alterity, immigration, the transmission of trauma. In 2007, she received the Œdipe price for her book "La Frontière invisible, violences de l’immigration (Editions Elema) in which she draws a link between her psychoanalytic practice and her political experience. Her biography-testimony of Frantz Fanon, published in several languages, highlights the singular parcours of this West Indian psychiatrist, well known for having emphasized the psychologic effects of colonisation on colonists and colonized.

== Main publications ==
- Mémoires Anachroniques, Lettre à moi-même et à quelques autres, Ed. de l'Aube, 2016
- Frantz Fanon: portrait, Seuil, 2000
- La frontière invisible : violences de l'immigration, Ed. des Crépuscules, 2009

== See also ==
- Résistantes, documentary of Fatima Sissani, France-Suisse, 2019, 1 h 16 min (see bibliographic record of general catalogue BnF) (Note: Released in 2017 under the title Tes cheveux démêlés cachent une guerre de sept ans; with testimonies of Eveline Safir Lavalette, Zoulikha Bekaddour et Alice Cherki.)
