= Fatima Sissani =

Algerian documentary filmmaker

Fatima Sissani (born 1970) is an Algerian documentary filmmaker whose work has garnered a number of prizes. She worked as a journalist for the independent Radio Zinzine and later France Culture's radio channel. She has directed four feature length documentaries that focus on themes of immigration, native Algerian culture, and revolutionary feminism.

== Early life and education ==
Fatima Sissani was born in 1970 in the Kabylia region of Algeria and immigrated to working class suburbs of Paris, France, at the age of six. As an adult in France, Sissani went to law school and began a career in journalism. She worked as a radio journalist for Radio Zinzine, an independent radio station run by the French anarchist collective Longo Maï Association. Sissani later conducted interviews for France Culture's radio channel. In 2011, she transitioned away from radio documentaries to film documentaries with La Langue de Zahra beginning her career as a director, writer, and interviewer in documentary film.

== Filmography ==
=== La Langue de Zahra (2011) ===
Sissani's first documentary, La Langue de Zahra (Zahra's Mother Tongue, 24images), portrays her mother, Zahra's, experience of migration from the Kabylia region of Algeria to France and her relationship to her home through Kabyle, a Berber language spoken by Kabyle people indigenous to Algeria. La Langue de Zahra follows Zahra through her apartment life in France as well as her reflections and conversations while in the Kabyle countryside. Through these conversations and with comparison to her own experience, Fatima explores how language, place, and culture contribute to "belonging" and how exile and migration mediate these experiences. Zahra's Mother Tongue received selection and or distinction from the following festivals and organizations:

- 1st of Documentary at Festival Vues d’Afrique - Montreal, Canada, 2012
- 1st Prize Festival du cinéma amazigh- Tizi Ouzou, Algeria, 2012
- 1st Prize, Festival Issni N’ourgh du cinéma amazigh - Agadir, Morocco, among other awards.

=== Les Gracieuses (2014) ===
Les Gracieuses (The Graces, 24Images) is an 80 minute documentary film released in 2014 is Sissani's second feature length documentary film. The film offers a portrait of six young women who grew up as children of immigrants in a low income housing complex in eastern France and have stayed in the same suburb to the present day. The documentary follows the six friends, Myriam, Sihem, Khadjia, Kenza, Rokia and Leïla as they discuss their stories, feelings, connections, and intimate beliefs on class, sex and friendship. Sissani worked daily until the film's completion with the six women, one of whom was her niece, as well as with Olga Widmer who worked Sissani's camera. The film received selection and or distinction from the following festivals and organizations :

- The International Oriental Film Festival - Geneva, Switzerland
- "Meeting of Documentary Films "Luttes et Résistances" - St. Jean-Lu-Gard, France
- Panorama des Cinemas du Maghreb et du Moyen-Orient- Paris, France
- Mediterranean Women's Films Marseille, France 2024
- Quintessence Festival- Ouidah, Benin 2015
- Views on World Cinema - Rouen, France 2014

=== Résistantes tes cheveux démêlés caćhent une guerre de sept ans (2017) ===
Sissani wrote and directed documentary Résistantes tes cheveux démêlés caćhent une guerre de sept ans (Women Resistants: Your Untangled Hair Hides a Seven-Year War), first released in France and Algeria in 2017 and produced by 24images, Girelle Production, and Thelma Film AG. The documentary follows three women freedom fighters, or moudjahidas in Arabic, involved in the National Liberation Front (FLN) in Algeria from 1954 to 1962. Sissani documents their experiences in the anti-colonial movement through interviews to share the roles of moudjahidas in the FLN. Résistantes primarily focuses on Eveline Safir Lavalette, raised by wealthy settlers in Algeria who took on the Algerian liberation struggle after learning and witnessing the discrimination against colonized Algerians. The film also features testimonies from Zoulikha Bekkadour and Alice Cherki. Largely told through oral testimonies, the documentary serves as an archive of previously untold women’s roles in the history of the Algerian independence movement. Women moudjahidas were largely excluded from nationalist history after Algeria gained its independence, and Sissani made the film in order to challenge the dominant, patriarchal, historical narrative.

Résistantes received mixed reactions from the global public due to its representation of the FLN. A screening scheduled for 2019 in Sainte-Livrade, France was cancelled after the theater received threats that it would be burned, and news of the screening inspired violent demonstrations in the surrounding area. In reference to the demonstrators, an association in Lot-et-Garonne said, "These individuals did not know the content of the film, but that mattered little to them... [they believed that] the women testifying in the film were not ‘resistance fighters’ but ‘terrorists,’ and they trampled the Algerian flag in front of the cinema." The protestors acted without watching the film, only knowing that the FLN was central to the documentary, and believing that colonial French Algerians had suffered at the hands of the FLN. In response to this cancellation, several organizations planned screenings around France to condemn the censorship of the film, advocating for the free expression of women freedom fighters and defending the FLN and the liberation movement.

=== C'est une Belle Carte Postale (2022) ===
Sissani's most recent work, C'est une Belle Carte Postale, is a 97 minute documentary that was released in 2022 and produced by Les Yeux Grands Ouverts, first premiering in France. Through testimonies from local residents, activists, and researchers, the documentary examines the social and spatial effects of large-scale urban renewal in the Plan d'Aou neighborhood of northern Marseille of France. The title, which translates to, "It's a beautiful postcard", underscores the disparity between the area's outward "postcard" appearance and the realities of the everyday struggles happening beneath the surface. In the film, Sissani primarily focuses on the perspectives of women across different generations from the community, who share their personal experiences and reflect on their lives before and after the impact of urban renewal. Their perspectives highlight how the displacement of longtime residents and the demolition of what was once a familiar space can disrupt longstanding connections and bonds within a neighborhood, and critiques the limitations of top-down urban policies.

Sissani's Filmography
Title	English Translated Title	Year	Production Studio
La Langue de Zahra	Zahra's Mother Tongue	2011	24Images
Les Gracieuses	The Graces	2014	24Images
Résistantes tes cheveux démêlés caćhent une guerre de sept ans	Women Resistants: Your Untangled Hair Hides a Seven-Year War	2017	24Images
C'est une Belle Carte Postale	It's a Beautiful Postcard	2022	Les Yeux Grand Ouverts

== Style and themes ==
Sissani's filmography is exclusively documentary, particularly focusing on documentary portraiture. She is a self-proclaimed feminist and each of her feature length films centers women's voices and experiences. She focuses on how women relate to each other and how they experience politically charged issues such as immigration (La Langue De Zahra and Les Gracieuses), urban renewal (C'est Une Belle Carte Postale), and Algerian politics, organizing, and cultural resistance (Resistantes and La Langue de Zahra).
