= Abdelmadjid Sidi Said =

Algerian trade unionist (born 1949)

Abdelmadjid Sidi Said (born 1949 in Michelet) is an Algerian politician, and the President of the General Union of Algerian Workers (UGTA) since 1997.

== Biography ==
Abdelmadjid Sidi Said started working as a welder and machinist in Sonatrach in 1965. In 1993, he became the head of the UGTA for the petroleum industry. In February 1997, he became the interim President of the UGTA following the assassination of his predecessor Abdelhak Benhamouda. He is elected President of the UGTA in 21 October 2000.

In September 2018, Abdelmadjid Sidi Said announced he was hit by a cancer and soon stepping down from his position as head of the UGTA.

On May 12, 2022, he was placed under arrest warrant for corruption cases.
