= Djemaa Saharidj =

Village in Kabylie region, Algeria

Coordinates: 36.6839°N 4.2900°E

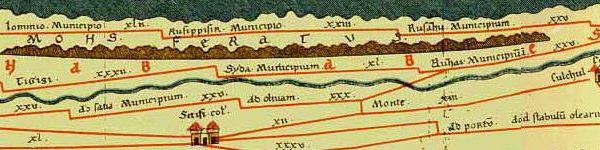
Detail of the Tabula Peutingeriana map (1-4th century CE centered on Bida/Syda Municipium (Djemâa-Saharidj)

Djemâa-Saharidj is a village in the wilaya of Tizi Ouzou, Algeria . The traditional center of the Aït Fraoussen tribe, and known for its abundance of resources, its ancient past and the role assigned to it in the history of the region. Djemâa Saharidj village is located about 3 km southeast of Mekla on the W250 road, and 28 km east of Tizi Ouzou. It has a post code of 15352 in the Algerian Post system.

== History ==
=== Antiquity ===
In the Roman period the town of Djemâa Saharidj was known as Bida by Claudius Ptolemy, Syda in the Tabula Peutingeriana and BiDil in the Antonine Itinerary. The city is much older however. Described in ancient documents as an oppidum or, Municipium, Bida was called a colony by Ptolemy. It was an important stop on the highway and a permanent garrison. The city was a bishopric and sent a bishop to the Council of Carthage (484) held by Vandal king Huneric.

Archaeological excavations conducted in 1868 have found important remains but in very poor condition. However the name of Bida has survived to this day in the land of the area, Tibhirt Ibudah, "the garden of Iboudah" and the surname Ibidah that still bears the family of Aït Fraoussen (the brawl which opposed the bloody their rivals on the occasion of a marriage is the cause of the removal of the wedding procession in Great Kabylia).

=== Islamic area ===
A number of Islamic scholars of the Middle Ages lived in the town.

In the 16th century, the early Ottoman period was marked by the emergence of the Kingdom of Koukou, a virtually independent principality that Belkadi, managed to build by exploiting the rivalry between Spain and the Sublime Porte.

At Djemâa Saharidj a man called Boukhtouche, "the man with the spear", became a folk hero historically poorly defined and eponymous ancestor of some families in the village. Who settled in the area with his faithful, had succeeded in the early seventeenth century to impose his personal power over the village and some of the neighboring tribes. But his brother Ourkhou (one of the sources of the village named Tala Iwurkhuten), following a quarrel between them, left Djemâa Saharidj. Their quarrel, endorsed by the tribes, is said to have triggered the formation of the two major leagues whose confrontation divided the Great Kabylia for centuries .

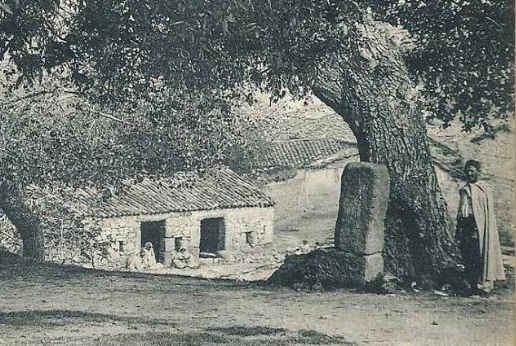
The "Salic stone" (since disappeared) erected on the Place du Vieux Marché in memory of the disinheritance of Kabyle women.

In the eighteenth century, according to tradition, it is still a Boukhtouche, descendant of the preceding, who organized the Old Market Square the assembly of tribes in which it was decided the disinheritance of Kabyle women. A "Salic stone" erected in the square long carried the testimony of this measure, which would have the original experience of the captives freed after a treaty signed with Spain in 1767.

=== French colonization ===
During the conquest French, the village of Djemâa Saharidj found itself several times directly threatened by military operations. In September 1844, an expedition of Dellys and led by General Coman back for the first time the valley Sebaou exceeds Tizi Ouzou, destroyed the village of Tamda abandoned by its inhabitants, shaves a nearby orange grove and continues in the direction of Djemaa Saharidj . A delegation of people coming parley to avoid the destruction of the village, at the cost of a semblance of submission: estimating its mission accomplished, the general returned to Dellys. In May 1871, during the suppression of the Mokrani Revolt, learning that large forces gathered in Djemâa Saharidj, General Lallemand decided to "go teach a lesson to the rebels" and led a column to attack the village: this is a serious setback for the attackers were repulsed and had to retreat in haste before their pursuers .

Once the country submitted Djemâa Saharidj became a testing ground for civil servants "kabylophiles": in 1881 it was with Tamazirt, Tizi Rached, Taourirt Mimoun and Mira, one of the five villages of Kabylie where government Jules Ferry decided to establish a secular school, called "ministerial school". Having aroused mistrust in the population of a mixture of curiosity, the company faces the indignation aroused by the closure, on the initiative of local authorities, Koranic schools and zaouïas. The hostility of the colonialists elected to any notion of "indigenous" instruction ends condemn experience whose main leaders are removed from 1884.

=== Independent Algeria ===
September 29, 1963, is on the main square of the village, Issefsafen (now up Aïssat Idir), its founders announce the birth of the Socialist Forces Front (FFS) before the assembled population.

== Demographics ==
The general census of 2008 gives Djemâa Saharidj a population of 6530 inhabitants, against 7,342 in 1998; an annual rate of change of -1.18%.

== Economy ==
Djemâa Saharidj is a renowned center of wood crafts and basketry.

According to the categories and the results of the 2008 census, the village, secondary agglomeration a predominantly rural commune, is itself attached to the urban network: it ranks in the semi-urban stratum, which includes the towns of at least 5,000 inhabitants and 1,000 non-farm assets. Its population is larger than that of the urban capital of Mekla, row for his part in the semi-rural category.

Djemâa Saharidj has a football club: the Athletic Union Djemâa Saharidj (USDS). During the 2010/2011 season, the club is moving in the Pre-Honor division of the province of Tizi Ouzou.

== Personalities linked to the town ==
- Sidi Sahnoun (v.776–v.854), marabou and lawyer Maliki school of Kairouan (current Tunisia ), is a mausoleum
- Ben Yahia Mostafa (16th century), Agha of the Ottoman Empire, built the mosque
- Salah Benacer (1900–1961), mayor of Mekla and Senator of Tizi Ouzou (1959-1961) under the French colonization, was born there.
- Aïssat Idir (1915–1959), militant nationalist and unionist, founder of the UGTA, was born there
- Arab sheikh Bouzgarene (1917–1988), singer of Kabyle music, was born there
- Ouali Bennaï (v.1920–1957), nationalist activist, advocate within the PPP / BACT of the thesis of the Algerian Algeria, was born and died assassinated
- Ali Mecili André (1940–1987), lawyer and politician assassinated in Paris, are his paternal origins
- Nait-Hashimi Djoudi (1946–2001), general secretary of the FFS and Minister under the chairmanship of Mohamed Boudiaf, was born there
- Alain Remond (born 1946), columnist, has taught
- Essaïd Belkalem (born 1 January 1989), footballer, was born there
