= Bida (North Africa) =

Coordinates: 36.68202°N 4.28826°W

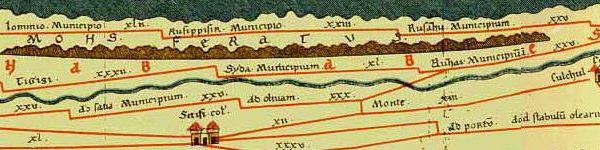
Detail of the Tabula Peutingeriana map (1-4th century CE; facsimile edition by Conradi Millieri, 1887/1888) centered on Bida

Bida is a former Ancient city and bishopric in Roman Africa, now a Latin Catholic titular see.

Its presumed location are the ruins at present Djemaa Saharidj in modern Algeria.

== History ==
The city was important enough in the Roman province of Mauretania Caesariensis to become a suffragan bishopric of its capital's Metropolitan Archbishop, but was to fade. Campanus represented Bida at the Council of Carthage (424).

=== Titular see ===
The diocese was nominally restored as a Latin Catholic titular bishopric in the 17th century as Bitha or Bita, renamed Bida in 1923–25.

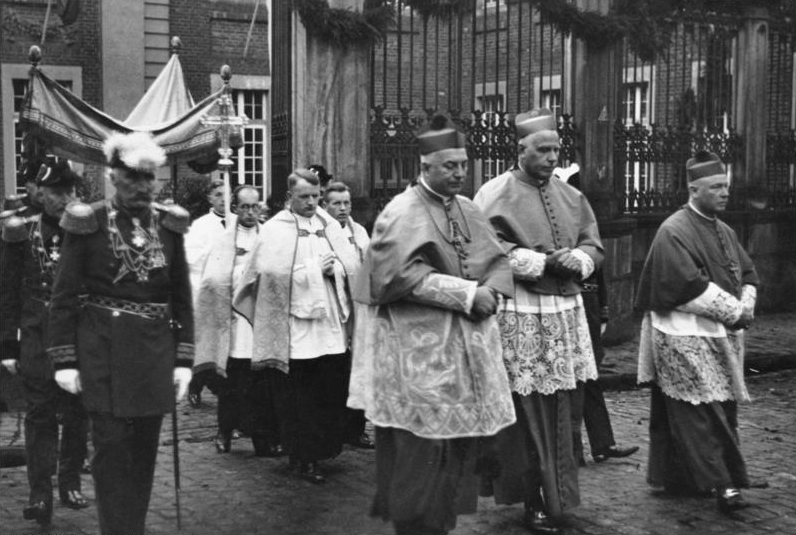
Franz Rudolf Bornewasser

It has had the following incumbents, all of the lowest (episcopal) rank :

- Guillaume Mahot, Paris Foreign Missions Society M.E.P. (1680.01.29 – 1684.06.04)
- Jean-Paul-Hilaire-Michel Courvezy, M.E.P. (1832.04.05 – 1857.05.01)
- Franz Rudolf Bornewasser (1921.04.23 – 1922.03.12) (later Archbishop)
- Frederick Eis (1922.07.08 – 1926.05.05)
- Carlos Labbé Márquez (1926.08.02 – 1929.12.20)
- James Augustine McFadden (1932.05.12 – 1943.06.02)
- Alexandre-Joseph-Charles Derouineau (德為能), M.E.P. (1943.12.08 – 1946.04.11) (later Archbishop)
- Aloysius Joseph Willinger, Redemptorists (C.SS.R.) (1946.12.12 – 1953.01.03)
- Ubaldo Evaristo Cibrián Fernández, Passionists (C.P.) (1953.03.07 – 1965.04.14)
- John Joseph Cassata (1968.03.12 – 1969.08.22)
- Norman Francis McFarland (1970.06.05 – 1976.02.10)
- Heinrich Machens (1976.03.24 – 2001.02.17)
- Sofronio Aguirre Bancud, (S.S.S.) (2001.05.24 – 2004.11.06)
- Julio Hernando García Peláez (2005.02.11 – 2010.06.05)
- Eugenio Scarpellini (2010.07.15 – 2013.07.26)
- Áureo Patricio Bonilla Bonilla, Friars Minor (O.F.M.) (2013.10.29 – ...), Apostolic Vicar of Galápagos (Ecuador)

== See also ==
- Catholic Church in Algeria
- Bita (Mauretania), in Mauretania Caesariensis
