= Youcef Zirem =

Algerian writer, activist and journalist

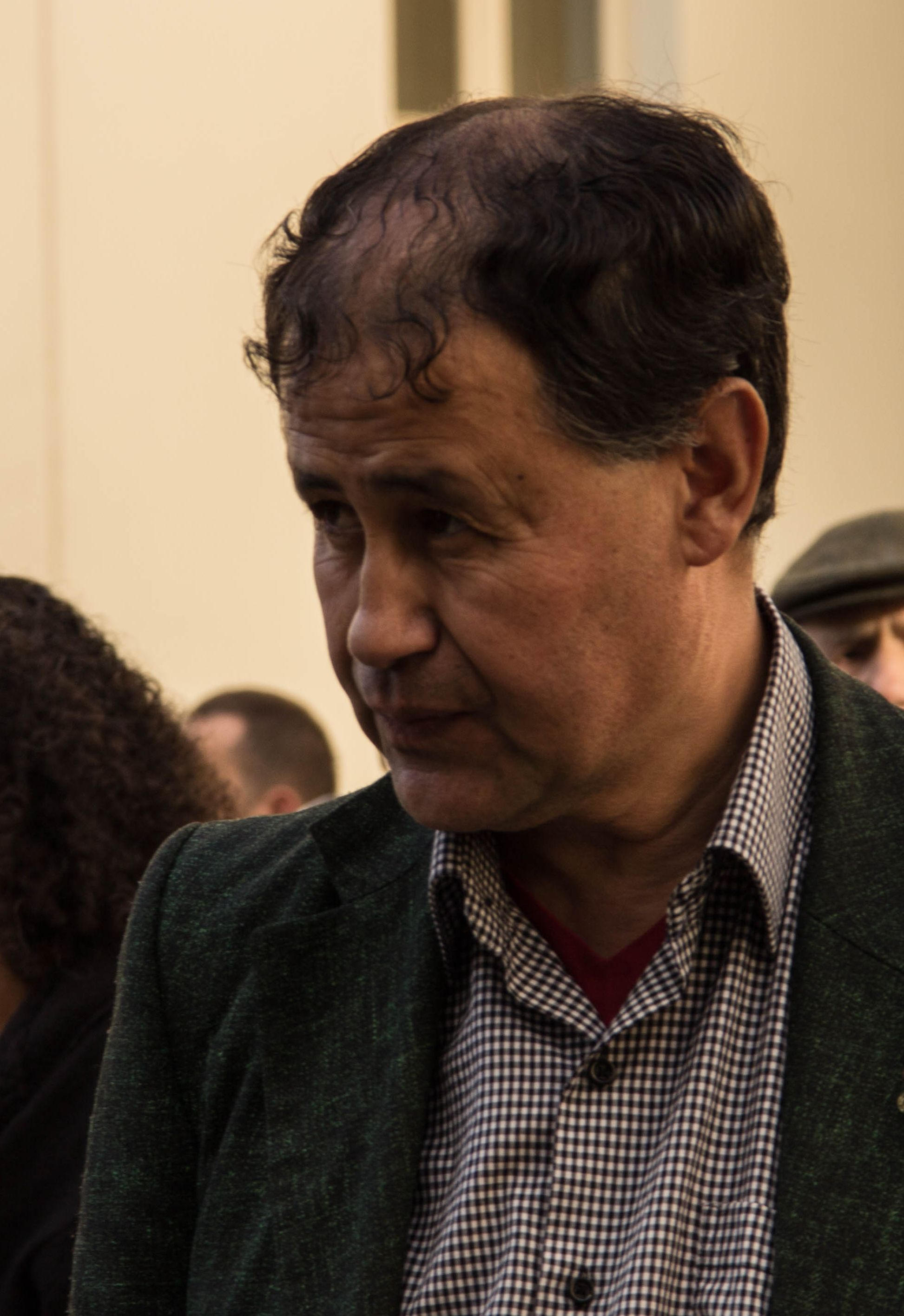
- Born: 16 August 1964 (age 61)
- Notable work: Life is a big lie, The Absence Orbit, Selections from the Algerian Story

Youcef Zirem (Arabic: يوسف زيرام) is an Algerian writer, activist and journalist.

== Career ==
Youcef Zirem and others on Al-Bayt publications in Algeria published an anthology of short stories in French and translated into Arabic by the Algerian writer, journalist, and translator Said Khatibi. It is related to the book "The Absence Orbit, Selections from the Algerian Story". It's the book that Youcef contributed with Ali Malik, Sufyan Al-Hajjaj, Safia Ketou, Abdul Hakim chaalal, Abdulrahman Zakkar, Hamid Ali Bouassida, Leïla Sebbar, Laila Hamutan, Salim Yasin, Habib Ayyoub, Rachid Mimouni, and Chawki Amari, where each of these writers specializes in writing a long story or a paragraph from the book.

Journalist Youcef published a second novel, entitled "The path to immortality" (Arabic: tariq alkhulud). In this novel, Youssef tried to approach the set of severe social difficulties and obstacles that would reduce Algerian women ambition.

The author extrapolates the story from an account of the daily life of an Algerian woman named Amina, who suddenly falls victim to rape from a forbidden act and finds herself pregnant. And then she crashes into watching her father's transformation from a peaceful man to a prince of an Islamic group, Which leads her to seek refuge to save her from the nightmare of living in the family.

However, she abandons the idea of escaping and willing to have the illegitimate child to embrace and raise, before she realizes that the necessities of raising a young child require a range of material costs. Which necessitates her to involved in a private prostitution group before she meets a French diplomat, Michel, a worker in Algeria, who gives her the opportunity to change her worldview and stirs feelings of love.

== Opinions ==
Youcef believes that the Algerian movement succeeded, despite the fact that the military regime existed in that period, he explained in a column published by (le matin dz) newspaper, "The Movement, this peaceful protest movement, two years after it started, still exists, despite the health crisis and the repression of the Algerian military regime... The movement worked because it exposed to the entire world the nature of the Algerian regime: military dictatorship”

Youcef also believes that the Algerian protests were the first time that Algerians dreamed together, without any compulsion, freedom, democracy, social justice, and dignity, highlighting that the movement includes activists from all streams: democrats, Islamists, nationalists, capitalists, socialists and others.

== His list of works ==
This is a list of the most prominent works of the Algerian writer and journalist Youcef Zirem:

- Life is a big lie (Arabic: alhayat kidhiba kabira).
- The Spirit of Sabrina (Arabic: ruh Sabrina), (a collection of short stories published in 2000).
- Sons of Fog (Arabic: 'abna' aldabab), (a collection of poetry published in 1995).
- The war of delusion (Arabic: harb aldalal), (a research study issued in 2002).
