= Abdelhak Benhamouda =

Algerian trade unionist (1946 – 1997)

Abdelhak Benhamouda (12 December 1946 in Constantine – 28 January 1997) was an Algerian trade unionist. He was secretary-general of the General Union of Algerian Workers (UGTA) from 1990 until his assassination by anti-socialist Islamists in 1997.

== Biography ==
Abdelhak Benhamouda was a contributing founder of the Algerian political party National Rally for Democracy (RND).

In december 1992, he was the target of a shooting when he walked out of his home in Kouba. The next year, his brother and relative were shot and killed in Constantine.

On 28 January 1997, Abdelhak Benhamouda was shot and died in front of the Maison du peuple, UGTA's headquarters. Armed, Abdelhak Benhamouda was able to pull out his gun and wound one of the aggressors. A policeman and the security guard working at the headquarters were also killed in the shooting. While dying in a friend's arms, Benhamouda supposedly mumbled «Kamel, my brother, they betrayed us». In the 1997 article relating this event, 4 persons were part of the assault. In 2005, 5 presumed murderers were sentenced to the death penalty by an Algerian court.
