= Trade unions in Algeria =

- National organization(s): UGTA
- Primary legislation: Article 56, Constitution

Global Rights Index
- 5 No guarantee of rights

International Labour Organization
- Algeria is a member of the ILO

Convention ratification
- Freedom of Association: 19 November 1962
- Right to Organise: 19 November 1962

Until 1954, trade unions in Algeria were structured within regional organizations of French trade unions. In 1954, the General Union of Algerian Trade Unions was established as a split from the General Confederation of Labour, and joined the World Federation of Trade Unions. By 1957, it had about 15,000 members. In 1956, the Algerian National Movement-linked Syndicalist Union of Algerian Workers and the National Liberation Front (FLN)-linked General Union of Algerian Workers (UGTA) were established.

After independence the General Union of Algerian Workers (UGTA) became the sole trade union center. In 1989, with constitutional changes and new laws the UGTA was distanced from the FLN and no longer retained the position of sole trade union center. Despite this, the UGTA continues to be, in practice, the only center - with few trade unions outside its affiliation.

During the Algerian Civil War the trade union movement was caught in the same violence that killed large numbers of civilians. Both ICTUR and Amnesty International report many deaths of trade union activists, concluding that the reasons for their deaths are difficult to determine, given the chaotic times. Reasons range from deaths directly related to union activities, through to other political issues (such as fundamentalist views of women teachers), and endemic random violence.
