= Union for a Kabyle Republic =

Kabyle nationalist political organization

Union for a Kabyle Republic: French: Union pour une république Kabyle; Kabyle: Tadukli i Tagduda Taqvaylit
- Abbreviation: URK
- Leader: Lyazid Abid
- Secretary-General: Kader Dahdah
- Founder: Bouaziz Ait Chebib
- Founded: 15 December 2017
- Banned: Algeria
- Split from: MAK
- Succeeded by: AKAL
- Headquarters: Paris, France
- Ideology: Kabyle nationalism Separatism
- Colors: Blue; Red; Yellow

Website
- https://www.urkabylie.org

The Union for a Kabyle Republic (URK; French: Union pour une république Kabyle, Kabyle: Tadukli i Tagduda Taqvaylit) is a Kabyle nationalist and independence political movement founded in 2017 by Bouaziz Ait Chebib.

The movement was, many times, victim of repression and arbitrary arrests by the Algerian government.

== History ==
It was founded on 15 December 2017 by Bouaziz Ait Chebib, former chairman of the Movement for the Self-Determination of Kabylia as a split from it, as well as 124 other militants, including Lyazid Abid, Hocine Azem, Hamid At Ali, Kader Dahdah, Moh Said Belkacemi, Belaïd Ammar Khodja, Nacera Mahmoudi, Massinissa Aït Merdja and Abdeslam Berkouk.

On May 1, 2019, the constitutional congress was held at Bouira. The National Council later met on 16 November 2019 during which Hocine Azem was appointed as Secretary General for a one-year term. It also confirmed the composition of the General Secretariat:

- Hocine Azem – Secretary General
- Moh Said Belkacemi – Secretary for Organizational Affairs
- Lwennas Haddadou – Secretary for Logistics
- Kahi Telleli – Secretary for the Promotion of Human Rights
- Abdeslam Berkouk – Secretary for the Promotion of Kabyle culture and language
- Massinissa Aït Merdja – Secretary for Strategy and Future Challenges
- Nacera Mahmoudi – Secretary for Foreign Relations
- Kader Dahdah – Secretary for Technical Affairs within the Diaspora
- Lyazid Abid – Secretary for Political Affairs within the Diaspora
- Malika Aït Ouadar – Secretary for Environmental Affairs

On 29 June 2021, the movement is classified as a terrorist movement by Algeria.

On 30 June 2021, the URK submitted a report to the OHCHR regarding what it described as repression of the Kabyle people by the Algerian government.

In 2024, the movement showed its support to the "Proclamation of the Renaissance of the Kabyle State" announced in New-York on 20 April of the same year, calling for unity among Kabyle independence movements.

== Ideology ==
The URK describes itself as an independence movement advocating the establishment of a Kabyle state through peaceful and democratic struggle and relying on popular mobilization, social media, diplomacy and the creation of a political balance of power.

It advocates for a secular, democratic and social republic based on:

- Freedom of conscience and religion
- Gender equality
- Human rights
- The preservation of the Kabyle language and culture

The movement also proposes an internal organization based on a decentralized political system based on collective leadership, with a National Council representing activists and the Kabyle diaspora. It emphasizes the need to rebuild social cohesion based on values it associates with Kabyle traditions such as solidarity, consultation (tajmaɛt) and participatory democracy. It supports the gradual construction of a "de facto Kabyle state" through development of a political, economic and social structures as a step towards the establishment of an independent state.
