= Aïssat Idir Station =

Station of the Algiers Metro

Aïssat Idir
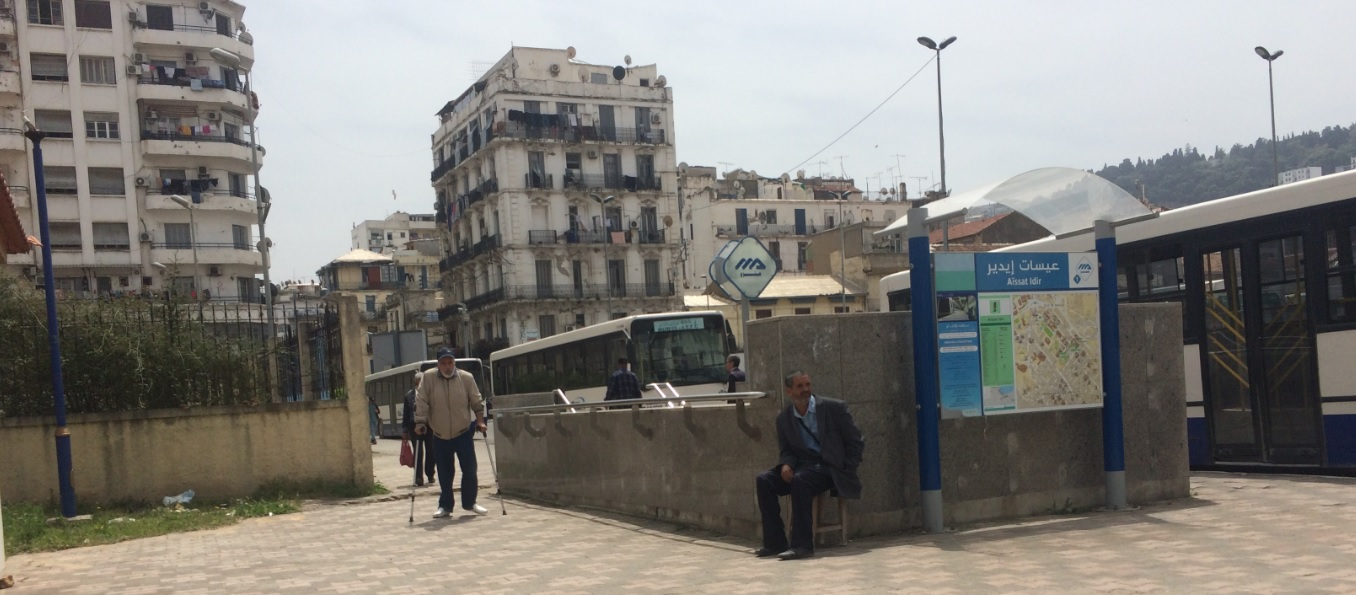

General information
- Location: Sidi M'Hamed
- Coordinates: 36°45′24″N 3°03′31″E
- Line: Line 1
- Platforms: 2 side platforms at each line
- Tracks: 2 per line
- Connections: ETUSA 1, 19, 26, 66, 94

Construction
- Accessible: yes

Other information
- Station code: AID

History
- Opened: November 1, 2011 (Line 1)

Services
Preceding station	Algiers Metro	Following station
1er Mai towards Place des Martyrs	Line 1	Hamma towards El Harrach Centre
Location

Aïssat Idir is a transfer station serving the Line 1 of the Algiers Metro, in Algiers, the capital of Algeria.
