= National Council of Evangelicals in France =

French evangelical Christian organisation

- Founded: 2010
- Type: Evangelical organization
- Purpose: Evangelical Christianity
- Headquarters: Paris, France
- Location: France
- Website: www.lecnef.org

The National Council of French Evangelicals (French: Conseil National des évangéliques de France, CNEF) is a national evangelical alliance in France and member of the World Evangelical Alliance.

== History ==
The CNEF's roots can be traced back to the 16th-century Reformation and subsequent Revival movements. However, its immediate precursor was a crucial meeting in June 2001 at the Nogent Bible Institute, organized by the French Evangelical Alliance (founded in 1846) and the French Evangelical Federation (founded in 1969). National Council of French Evangelicals was founded in June 2010.

The first national convention took place on January 26, 2012 in Montreuil, Seine-Saint-Denis with 850 pastors.

== Statistics ==
By 2025, it would have 34 member Christian denominations, 179 associations, 2,530 evangelical churches, and 745,000 members.
