= Alliance for a Free Kabylia =

Kabyle nationalist political organization

Alliance for a Free Kabylia Alliance pour une Kabylie libre
- Abbreviation: AKAL
- Secretary-General: Boussaad Becha
- Spokesperson: Ahviv Mekdam
- Founder: Bouaziz Ait Chebib
- Founded: 2020
- Banned: Algeria
- Split from: URK
- Headquarters: Paris, France
- AKAL France: Malika Merbet
- AKAL Canada: Slotane Benyoub
- AKAL Germany: Arina Adour
- Ideology: Kabyle nationalism Separatism; Secularism
- Colors: Blue; Red; Yellow

The Alliance for a Free Kabylia (AKAL; French: Alliance pour une Kabylie libre), shortened as AKAL is a Kabyle nationalist and pro-independence political movement. It emerged from a faction of the Union for a Kabyle Republic (URK), itself led by Bouaziz Ait Chebib, former chairman of the MAK.

== History ==
The organization was initially a wing of the Union for a Kabyle Republic led by Bouaziz Ait Chebib. In 2020, this faction split from the movement to become the Alliance for a Free Kabylia or AKAL which also means "Land" in the Kabyle language.

In 2021, Bouaziz Ait Chebib, leader of the movement, was taken into custody by the gendarmerie of Tizi-Ouzou.

On January 23, 2021, the movement created three wings in different countries. Malika Merbet was appointed as the coordinator of AKAL France, Slotane Benyoub, as the coordinator of AKAL Canada, and Arina Adour, as the coordinator of AKAL Germany.

On June 29, 2021, the movement is classified as a terrorist movement by Algeria.

== Ideology ==
The AKAL advocates for the independence of Kabylia through peaceful means.
