= Ahmed Azeggagh =

Algerian poet

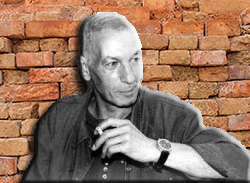
- Born: July 5, 1942; Bejaia, Algeria
- Died: April 24, 2003 (aged 60); Algeria
- Education: Language, French

Ahmed Azeggagh (Arabic:أحمد أزقاغ) (July 5, 1942 - April 24, 2003) was an Algerian poet, novelist and journalist.

== Career ==
Azeggagh was born in 1942 in Bejaia, to a family of five children. He went with his father to Marseille in 1952, where he spent the rest of his childhood. He returned to Algeria and worked as a teacher at an elementary school in Bejaia, after independence in 1962.

He left for Algiers in 1963, where he published articles on Algerian authors in Algeria Republic and Alger-Ce soir, before joining APS (Algerie Press Service). His contact with writers, artists, and intellectuals who were present in the Algerian National Theater led to the publication of his first poems in "November" magazine, the first Algerian cultural magazine. He also participated in the national culture and revolutionary culture debate with Bachir Hadj Ali, Mohamed Boudia and Mohammed Khadda, which was published in June 1965 in the French magazine "Démocratie nouvelle".

Azeggagh resided in Tunisia after the June 19, 1965 coup, only to return a few months later to Algiers, and then made other trips in a political context, particularly to the Middle East, where he dealt with Mohamed Boudia for the Palestinian cause.

Azqagh immigrated to France, and settled there between 1970 and 1990. With Algeria opening up to more freedom of expression, Ahmed Azeggagh returned to Algeria in 1990, but at a time when violence took hold of the country, particularly through the assassination of many intellectuals and writers, such as Tahar Djaout, he decided to return to France in 1993.

Ahmed Azeggagh returned to Algeria for good in 1997, after the death of one of his brothers. He founded the cultural magazine (Escales) there (there were two issues in 1997 and 1998). Then he worked for the daily newspaper "La Tribune" for a few months. Ahmed Azeggagh also worked as managing editor for the “Algeria Hebdo” website and as a consultant and translator for two programs for Algerian Radio 3 In Algiers.

== Death ==
He died in Algiers after a long illness.

== His works ==
- The Legacy, (Arabic: al'iirth), (novel),1966.
- For every job, (Arabic: likuli wazifatih),1966.
- Silence Tales, (Arabic: hikayat alsamt), (poetry), 1974.
- Republic of Shadows, (Arabic: jumhuriat alzilal), (play),1976.
- White is White, (al'abyad 'abyad), (poetry),1987.
