= Bouaziz Ait Chebib =

Algerian politician

- Buɛziz At Cebbib
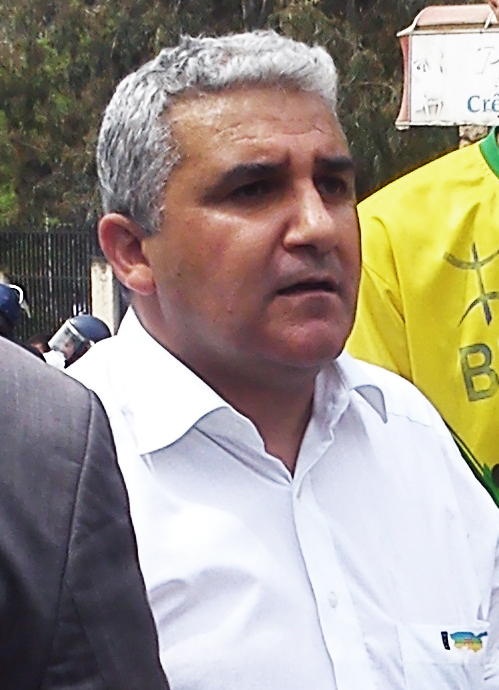
- Bouaziz Ait Chebib during the April 20, 2014 march

President of the AKAL
- Incumbent
- Assumed office 2019

1st President of the URK
- In office December 15, 2017 – 2019

4th President of the MAK
- In office December 9, 2011 – November 17, 2016
- Preceded by: Mouloud Mebarki
- Succeeded by: Ferhat Mehenni

Personal details
- Born: February 23, 1973 (age 53) Ait Saâda, Yattafène
- Citizenship: Kabyle
- Party: RCD (1989–1994); MAK (2001–2016); URK (2016–2019); AKAL (since 2019)
- Profession: Politician

Bouaziz Ait Chebib (Kabyle: Buɛziz At Cebbib; born 23 February 1973 in Ait Saâda, Yattafène) is a Kabyle politician in exile, former president of the Movement for the Self-Determination of Kabylia, founder and former president of the Union for a Kabyle Republic (URK) and founder and president of the Alliance for a Free Kabylia (AKAL).

== Biography ==
In 2016, he left his post as a president of the MAK and created his own movement, the Union for the Republic of Kabylia. In 2020, his faction split from the URK to become the Alliance for a Free Kabylia.

In 2021, he was taken into custody by the gendarmerie of Tizi-Ouzou.
