= Safia Ketou =

- Born: Rabhi Zohra; 15 November 1944; Aïn Sefra, Naâma, Algeria
- Died: 29 January 1989 (age 37); Bridge on Boulevard Telemly, Algiers, Algeria
- Known for: Among the first science fiction authors in Algeria

Rabhi Zohra, better known under her pseudonym Safia Ketou, (Aïn Sefra), 15 November 1944 – Algiers, 29 January 1989) was an Algerian writer, poet and playwright, one of her country's most eminent writers in the period following Algerian independence from France and the first science fiction author in Algeria.

== Biography ==
Rabhi Zohra was born in 1944, in Aïn Sefra, in the province of Naâma, Algeria. She was a teacher from 1962 to 1969, when she decided to move to the capital, Algiers. There she became a journalist and worked for several major newspapers in the city, including APS (Algerian Press Service), Horizon and Algérie-Actualité.

== Young writer ==
As she began her career as a journalist, Safia met several writers and, already a poet at that time, began to venture into writing plays, short stories and novels, mainly science fiction. Safia was among the first Algerian writers to write science fiction stories, and the first post-independence science-fiction writer. Her writing is charged with the feelings of the country after independence in 1962. Her themes range from love, politics, patriotism, science fiction and various social issues; her texts also contain many autobiographical elements. She was a member of the Union of Algerian Writers.

She has also written several children's books in a series called Rose Des Sables. Her collection of poetry, entitled Amie Cithare, was published in 1979. A play, Asthme, was written the same year. Her collection of science fiction stories, La Planète Mauve et Autres Nouvelles, was published in 1983. This collection contains several stories that take place in space, defying time and space, in mythical places and strange peoples.

Safia Ketou was interested in Isabelle Eberhardt and her writings before she began writing, first of all poetry. Safia Ketou is distinguished by a pen full of emotion, reflecting the desire for a better world, lasting peace, and fair justice.

== Death ==
Safia Ketou committed suicide on 29 January 1989 in Algiers by jumping from the bridge on Boulevard Telemly, near APS headquarters. She was buried in the Sidi Boudjemaa cemetery in Ain Sefra alongside Isabelle Eberhardt, the Franco-Swiss writer. She died at the age of 44.

== Published works ==
Safia Ketou has composed several works:

- "Amie-Cithare" (poetry) in 1979.
- Asma (play) in 1979
- La Planète Mauve in 1983 published in Canada by Naâma Editions, which was the first Algerian science fiction work.
- Rose Des Sables 1983

Safia Ketou was also the author of plays produced during the RTA era. Her poetry is strongly marked by the theme of war, the Algerian war, but also misery, injustice, exploitation and racism. However, her writing goes beyond the borders of her country of origin, she nourished the hope that one day the war would end and give way to social justice. She composed for all five continents because she hoped that one day the war would end and brotherhood would be celebrated.
