= Aïssat Idir =

Algerian trade unionist

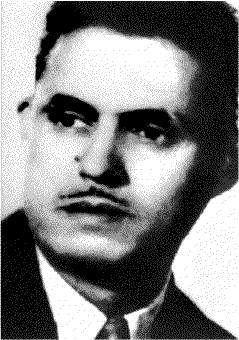

Secretary General of the General Union of Algerian Workers
- In office 24 February 1956 – 24 May 1956
- Succeeded by: Position Abolished

Personal details
- Born: Aïssat Idir; 11 June 1915 Djemaa Saharidj, French Algeria
- Died: 27 July 1959 (44 Years old) El Biar, French Algeria
- Resting place: Sidi M'Hamed, Algeria
- Occupation: Journalist

Aïssat Idir was an Algerian Syndicalist, founder of the General Union of Algerian Workers and martyr during the Algerian War, He was born in Mekla, more precisely Djemaa Saharidj on 11 June 1915, and died in a military hospital in Algiers on 27 July 1959.

== Biography ==
=== Early life ===
Aïssat Idir was born on June 11, 1915, in Djamaâ Saharidj, in the wilaya of Tizi Ouzou, where he studied. His mother died when he was six years old. However, this event did not prevent him from excelling in school. Unfortunately, he had an incident on the day of the exam and therefore could not access the Bouzaréah Normal School. He went to Tunisia to live with his uncle in 1935, returning to take an exam at Ateliers industriels de l’air, an aéronautique group in 1939 in 1950/51 he was suspected to be part of the Special Organization after a factory had gone on strike.

=== Politics ===
From 1949 to 1954 Aïssat Idir was member of an unknown Syndicalist group affiliated with the Movement for the Triumph of Democratic Liberties then he chose to support the FLN during the Algerian War. He was arrested for his Syndicalist activity but freed on 22 December 1954.

In the summer of 1955, there was a plot by the Messalistes to establish a trade union, and when Aïssat Idir became aware he discussed it with Abane Ramdane, and on behalf of the FLN, both founded the General Union of Algerian Workers on February 24th 1956 with many other workers. The Union's goal was to mobilize workers to fight against colonialism and its injustices and he proclaimed himself Secretary General for the Union. He was then arrested on 23 or 24 May 1954, along with 40 of his workers, and imprisoned in Serkadji Prison where he is suspected him of being a member of the ICFTU. During his imprisonment, he was tortured by French colonialists. However he was defended by his lawyer Henri Rolin, hired by the ICFTU. Rolin succeeded in getting him out of jail on January 13, 1959. He was then stopped by two Gendarmes, and sent back to Prison in Birtraria, however this time the ICFTU fails. and the General Union of Algerian Workers is closed by French authorities the same day he got arrested.

=== Death ===
His family and lawyers were not given the right to visit Aissat while he was in jail for more than 2 months. Later French authorities announced that he had attempted suicide and was taken to a Military Hospital, where he was visited by one of his lawyers, in the presence of a French guard, Aïssat denied that he attempted suicide, but claimed he was tortured and that his legs were badly burned from it. He died several months later on June 16, 1959, from the burns. French colonial administration denied torturing Aïssat Idir, and claimed that he had accidentally burnt his bed, after falling asleep while smoking. He was buried in Sidi M'hamed Bou Qobrine Cemetery.
