= Kabyle grammar =

Grammar of the Kabyle language

Kabyle grammar is the set of structural rules and regulations included in the Kabyle language, ranging from words to phrases, to punctuation, and sentences.

== Nouns and adjectives ==
=== Gender ===
As an Afro-Asiatic language, Kabyle has only two genders, masculine and feminine. Like most Berber languages, masculine nouns and adjectives generally start with a vowel (a-, i-, u-), while the feminine nouns generally start with t- and end with a -t (there are some exceptions, however). Note that most feminine nouns are in fact feminized versions of masculine nouns.

Examples:

- aqcic "a boy", taqcict "a girl".
- amɣar "an old man", tamɣart "an old woman".
- argaz "a man", tameṭṭut "a woman".
- izi "a fly", tizit "mosquito".

Certain masculine nouns do not start with a vowel: laẓ "hunger", seksu "couscous", and beṭṭu "separation". These include the names of relatives: gma "my brother", mmi "my son", and baba "my father".

Certain feminine nouns do not end with a -t: tasa "liver", tili "shadow", and timess "fire".

Certain feminine nouns do not start with a t-: lexdma "work" and rradyu "radio". These include the names of relatives: weltma "my sister", yelli "my daughter", and yemma "my mother".

Loan words that end with a consonant are usually masculine: zzman "time" (from Arabic); Loan words that end with a vowel are usually feminine: qahwa "coffee".

=== Pluralization ===
Singular nouns generally start with an a-, and do not have a suffix. Plural nouns generally start with an i- and often have a suffix such as -en. There are three types of plural : External, Internal, Mixed:

- External or "Regular": consists in changing the initial vowel of the noun, and adding a suffix -n,

amɣar "an old man" → imɣaren "old men".
argaz → irgazen "men"
ul → ulawen "hearts"

- Internal: involves only a change in the vowels within the word:

adrar → idurar "mountain"
amicic "a cat" → imcac "cats"

- Mixed: combines a change of vowels (within the word) with the suffix -n:

igenni "sky" → igenwan "skies".
izi → izan "fly"
aẓar → iẓuran "root"
afus → ifassen "hands

- Special cases: that do not fall into any of the previous three categories
  - Initial vowel -a does not change: tama "side" → tamiwin "sides"
  - Initial vowel -u does not change: tuɣmest "tooth" → tuɣmas "teeth"
  - Loan words from Arabic that keep their Arabic plural: lɛada "tradition" → leɛwayed "traditions"

Certain words exist only in the plural form and do not have a singular, such as: aman "water", medden "people", and ammiwen "eyebrows".

Certain words exist only in the singular form and do not have a plural, such as: tidet "truth", tiɣrit "correction", and tagella "food".

The plural of certain words can change the meaning of the singular: tuccanin "mercurial", plural of tuccent "female jackal"; timeddukkal "placenta", plural of tamdeddakelt "female friend".

Certain words can have different plural forms with different meanings: iri "collar" has two plural forms, iran "edge" or irawen "responsibility".

=== Free and annexed state ===
As in all Berber languages, Kabyle has two types of states or cases of the noun: one is unmarked (and can be glossed as abs or fs), while the other serves as a post-verbal subject of a transitive verb and the object of a preposition, among other contexts, and may be glossed as ann, int or cs. The former is often called free state, the latter construct state. The construct state of the noun derives from the free state through one of the following rules:

The first involves a vowel alternation, whereby the vowel a become u :

amaziɣ → umaziɣ "Berber"
ameqqran → umeqqran "big"
adrar → udrar "mountain"

The second involves the loss of the initial vowel in the case of some feminine nouns (the sound represented by the letter 'e' is not considered a true vowel):

tamɣart → temɣart "women"
tamdint → temdint "town"
tamurt → tmurt "country"

The third involves the addition of a semi-vowel (w or y) word-initially:

asif → wasif "river"
aḍu → waḍu "wind"
iles → yiles "tongue"
uccen → wuccen "jackal"

Finally, some nouns do not change for free state. These include masculine nouns that do not start with a vowel, feminine nouns that do not start with -t, and feminine nouns whose initial vowel is -a or -u:

taddart → taddart "village"; feminine noun whose initial vowel is -a
tuccent → tuccent "female jackal"; feminine noun whose initial vowel is -u
fad → fad "thirsty"; masculine noun that does not start with a vowel
weltma → weltma "sister"; feminine noun that does not start with -t

Summary of the annexed state formation

In the schematic notation used below, C represents a consonant, and V represents a vowel.

Initial vowel alteration
General rule	Free state	Annexed state	Example
aCC- → weC-	azrem	wezrem	"serpent"
iCC- → yeC-	itri	yetri	"star"

Maintenance of the initial vowel
General rule	Free state	Annexed state	Example
aCV- → waCV-	aman	waman	"water"
iCV- → yiCV-	izem	yizem	"lion"
uC- → wuC-	uccen	wuccen	"jackal"

Feminine nouns (initial ta- / ti-)
General rule	Free state	Annexed state	Example
taCV- → tØCV-	tamurt	tmurt	"country"
tiCV- → tØCV-	timura	tmura	"countries"
taCC- → taCC-	taggara	taggara	"end"
tiCt → tiCt	tiṭ	tiṭ	"eye"

Depending on the role of the noun in the sentence, it takes either its free or annexed state.

Yewwet aqcic.
3SG-hit.PFV boy.ABS
He hit a boy.

When located after a verb, the direct object of the verb takes the free state, while the subject is in the annexed state.

Yewwet weqcic aydi.
3SG-hit.PFV boy.ANN dog.ABS
The boy hit a dog.

When the direct object is indicated on the verb by a direct object affix, the direct object's identity may be restated in the annexed state.

Yewwet-it weydi.
3SG.M-hit.PFV-3SG.M.ACC dog.ANN
He hit a dog.

When a noun is moved in front of the verb to establish it as the sentence topic, it remains in its free state.

Aqcic yewwet aydi.
boy.ABS 3SG-hit.PFV dog.ABS
The boy hit a dog.

After a preposition (at the exception of "ar" and "s"), all nouns take their annexed state. Hence the free-state noun aman (water), annexed state waman, can form kas n waman, (a glass of water), with the preposition n "of" triggering the construct state's appearance.

=== Adjectives ===
Adjectives can be formed by deriving a verb or using elements placed before the noun.

==== Verb derivation ====
- From a stative verb: izwiɣ "to be red" → azeggaɣ "red"
- Identical to an agent noun: ilaẓ "to be hungry" → amellẓu "hungry"
- By adding the suffix -an to a verb: ihiriw "to be large" → ahrawan "large"
- By adding the prefix u- to a verb: zmer "to be able" → uzmir "strong" or "capable"

==== Using elements before the noun ====
- Adding bu "who has" (masculine singular), mu "who has" (feminine singular), at "who have" (masculine plural), sut "who have" (feminine plural) + noun in the annexed state: bu uqerru, mu uqerru "tenacious" (uqerru from aqerru "head"); sut wartiran "demonym for people from At Waritran, in this case feminine plural"
- Adding war "without" (masculine) or tar "without" (feminine) + noun in the free state: war sseɛd, tar sseɛd "unlucky"
- Adding yir "bad" + noun in the free state: yir zwaǧ "a bad marriage"

== Verbs ==
Kabyle verbs inflect for four paradigms of tense–aspect–mood, three of them conventionally labelled the preterite (expressing perfective aspect), intensive aorist (expressing imperfective aspect) and aorist (essentially functioning like an irrealis or subjunctive mood). Unlike other Berber languages, where it is used to express the present, the aorist alone is rarely used in Kabyle, instead often appearing with an accompanying particle. The preterite also has an accompanying negative paradigm which may or may not differ from that of the non-negative preterite depending on the verb.

- "Weak verbs" have a preterite form that is the same as their aorist. Examples of weak verbs that follow are conjugated at the first person of the singular:

Verb	Preterite	ad + aorist	Intensive aorist
If (to outdo)	ifeɣ	ad ifeɣ	ttifeɣ
Muqel (to observe)	muqleɣ	ad muqleɣ	ttmuquleɣ
Krez (to plough)	kerzeɣ	ad kerzeɣ	kerrzeɣ

- "Strong verbs" or "irregular verbs":

Verb	Preterite	ad + aorist	Intensive aorist
Aru (to write)	uriɣ	ad aruɣ	ttaruɣ

The intensive aorist can be used alone or with the following particles:

- ar: to indicate an extended action: ar ileḥḥu "he walks for a long time"
- la: to indicate a continuous action in the present, equivalent of the present continuous in English: la yettazzal "he is running"
- a la: to indicate a continuous action in the past: a la yeqqar "he was saying"
- ad: to indicate a continuous action in the future: ad ttmerriḥeɣ "I will be taking a walk"

=== Conjugation ===
Conjugation in Kabyle is done by adding affixes (prefixes, suffixes or both). These affixes are static and identical for all finite stems, with only the theme changing. Kabyle is a pro-drop language, where the affixes are sufficient to indicate the subject pronouns, without the need to include the pronouns separately.

Kabyle person-number affixes
Person	Singular	Plural
1st	— (e)ɣ	n(e) —
2nd (m)	t(e) — (e)ḍ	t(e) — (e)m
2nd (f)	t(e) — (e)ḍ	t(e) — (e)mt
3rd (m)	i/y(e) —	— (e)n
3rd (f)	t(e) —	— (e)nt

A group of stative/resultative verbs (such as imɣur "to be/become big or old") use a different set of person-number endings in their preterites, which contains only suffixes.

Kabyle stative preterite person-number affixes
Person	Singular	Plural
1st	— (e)ɣ	— it
2nd (m)	— (e)ḍ	— it
2nd (f)	— (e)ḍ	— it
3rd (m)	—	— it
3rd (f)	— (e)t	— it

==== Preterite formation ====
In weak verbs, the aorist and preterite stems are identical. In strong verbs, however, the preterite differs from the aorist, typically through vowel alternation and, in some cases, consonant gemination or tension. The table below summarizes common patterns described in the literature.

Type	Aorist	Meaning	Preterite	Alternation
Weak verbs	yekrez	"to plough"	yekrez	no change
Simple vowel alternation	afeg	"to fly"	ufeg	a → u
Simple vowel alternation	awi	"to bring"	wwi	a → Ø / w
Simple vowel alternation	mlil	"to meet"	mlal	i → a
Simple vowel alternation	mmet	"to die"	mmut	e → u
Ø alternation	yezz	"to bite"	yezza	Ø → a
Two-vowel alternation	inṭih	"to vociferate"	unṭah	i-i → u-a
Two-vowel alternation	argu	"to dream"	urga	a-u → u-a
Double alternation	rnu	"to add"	rni / rna	u → i / a
Consonant tension	idir	"to live"	dder	vowel shift + gemination

==== Intensive aorist formation ====
The intensive aorist is a verbal form derived from the basic aorist stem. Stem structures are often represented using the symbols C (consonant) and V (vowel); R denotes the initial consonant or consonant cluster of the aorist stem, and R′ the corresponding intensive prefix. The intensive aorist is typically formed by prefixing tt- (or tte-), frequently accompanied by vowel alternation or consonant gemination depending on the stem type. The table below summarizes common formation patterns described in the literature.

Aorist pattern	Intensive pattern	Example (aorist)	Meaning	Intensive form
R e–e	R′ e–i	welleh	"to direct"	ttwellih
R v–ec	R′ v–vc	muqel	"to look"	ttmuqul
R v₁–v₂	R′ v₁–v₂	nadi	"to search"	ttnadi
C₁C₂V	C₁eC₂C₂V	rnu	"to add"	rennu
CCV	te- + CCV	ddu	"to go"	teddu
V-initial	tt- + V-stem	awi	"to bring"	ttawi
(stem-class pattern)	C → CC	ger	"to put"	ggar

As an example, the full finite conjugation of the verb afeg "to fly" exhibiting its four themes (preterite ufeg, negative preterite ufig, aorist afeg, and intensive aorist ttafeg) is given below. For Kabyle verbs, the citation form of a verb is the second-person singular imperative.

Finite conjugation of Kabyle afeg "to fly"
Person	Preterite		Negative Preterite		Aorist		Intensive Aorist		Imperative		Intensive Imperative	
Person	Singular	Plural	Singular	Plural	Singular	Plural	Singular	Plural	Singular	Plural	Singular	Plural
1st	ufgeɣ	nufeg	ufigeɣ	nufig	afgeɣ	nafeg	ttafgeɣ	nettafeg				
2nd (m)	tufgeḍ	tufgem	tufigeḍ	tufigem	tafgeḍ	tefgem	tettafgeḍ	tettafgem	afeg	afget	ttafeg	ttafget
2nd (f)	tufgeḍ	tufgemt	tufigeḍ	tufigemt	tafgeḍ	tefgemt	tettafgeḍ	tettafgemt	afeg	afgemt	ttafeg	ttafgemt
3rd (m)	yufeg	ufgen	yufig	ufigen	yafeg	afgen	yettafeg	ttafgen				
3rd (f)	tufeg	ufgent	ur tufig	ur ufigent	ad tafeg	ad afgent	tettafeg	ttafgent				

The participles in Kabyle are used as a means of expressing relative phrases in which the preceding noun is the participle's subject. In the following proverb, ur nxeddem "who doesn't work" modifies argaz "man".

Argaz ur nxeddem, efk-as taṛuka ad yellem!
man.ABS NEG NEG.PTCP-work.IPFV, give.IMP-3SG.M.IO distaff.ABS PTCL 3SG.M-spin.AOR
A man who doesn't work is not a real man. (lit. A man who doesn't work? Give him a distaff to spin!)

Each Kabyle verb has five participles, all formed by attaching various affixes onto a corresponding finite stem.

Preterite Participle		Aorist Participle	Intensive Aorist Participle	
Positive	Negative	Aorist Participle	Positive	Negative
yufgen	ur nufig	ara yafgen	yettafeg	ur nettafeg

=== Verb framing ===
Kabyle is a satellite-framed based language, Kabyle verbs use two particles to show the path of motion:

- d orients toward the speaker, and could be translated as "here".
- n orients toward the interlocutor or toward a certain place, and could be translated as "there".

Examples:

- « iruḥ-d » (he came), « iruḥ-n » (he went).
- « awi-d aman» (bring the water), « awi-n aman » (carry away the water).

=== Negation ===
Kabyle usually expresses negation in two parts, with the particle ur attached to the verb, and one or more negative words that modify the verb or one of its arguments. For example, simple verbal negation is expressed by « ur » before the verb and the particle « ara » after the verb:

- « Urareɣ » ("I played") → « Ur urareɣ ara » ("I did not play")

Other negative words (acemma ... etc.) are used in combination with ur to express more complex types of negation.

Negation of the verbs in the subjunctive mood is achieved by the form a wer + verb

- « ad yeqqim! » ("Let him stay!) → « a wer yeqqim! » (Let him not stay!)

Negation of the verbs in the imperative mood is achieved by the form ur + intensive imperative + ara

- « aru » ("write") →« ur ttaru ara » ("Do not write")

=== Auxiliaries ===
==== The auxiliary ili (to be) ====
ili + verb is employed to express the following aspects:

- A possibility, a doubt, or a repetition in the future, and the future perfect
- A repetition in the past, and the past perfect
- A habit or a normal state

Examples

1. yeswa (sew "to drink" in the preterite) + yella (ili "to be" in the preterite) → yella yeswa "He had drunk"
2. yeswa (sew "to drink" in the preterite) + ad yili (ili "to be" in the aorist) → ad yili yeswa "He will have drunk"
3. yebzeg (bzeg "to be wet" in the preterite) + yettili (ili "to be" in the intensive aorist) → yettilli yebzeg "It is usually wet"
4. tesseɣ (sew "to drink" in the intensive aorist) + lliɣ (ili "to be" in the preterite) → lliɣ tesseɣ "I was drinking"
5. tesseɣ (sew "to drink" in the intensive aorist) + iliɣ (ili "to be" in the aorist) → ad iliɣ tesseɣ "I will be drinking"

==== The auxiliary aɣ (to have) ====
aɣ in its general meaning "to take" can be used in complex verb construction in its preterite form yuɣ, or intensive aorist form yettaɣ. Its use is equivalent to the use of the verb ili.

Examples

1. yuɣ lḥal yečča "He had (already) eaten"
2. yuɣ-iten lḥal ad awḍen ass-nni "They must have arrived on that day"

=== Verb derivation ===
Verb derivation is done by adding affixes. There are three types of derivation forms : Causative, reflexive and Passive.

- Causative: The causative or factitive is formed primarily by prefixation of ss- to the verbal stem. The derived form typically expresses causation ("to cause to do" or "to make become"). Depending on the phonological structure of the stem, vowel alternations may occur. Representative examples are shown below.

Causative prefix	Primary verb	Meaning	Causative	Meaning
ss-	kcem	"to enter"	ssekcem	"to introduce"
ss-	ɣer	"to study"	ssɣer	"to teach"
ss-	agad	"to fear"	ssiged	"to frighten"
ss-	ali	"to go up"	ssali	"to make go up"
ss-	ffeɣ	"to go out"	ssufeɣ	"to make go out"
ss-	arǧu	"to wait"	ssarǧu	"to make wait"
s-	ni	"to be threaded"	sni	"to thread"
s-	luɣ	"to be troubled"	sluɣ	"to trouble"
s-	ddu	"to walk"	seddu	"to make walk"
assimilated (zz-, cc-)	zger	"to cross"	zzger	"to make cross"
assimilated (zz-, cc-)	cceḍ	"to slip"	cciceḍ	"to make slip"

- Reflexive: The reflexive or reciprocal is formed by prefixation, most commonly with m- (often realized as me-, my- or with vowel insertion depending on the stem). The derived form typically expresses mutual or reciprocal action (e.g., “each other”). The table below illustrates representative reciprocal formations.

Reflexive prefix	Primary verb	Meaning	Reflexive form	Meaning
m- / me-	fareq	"to separate"	mfaraq	"to separate from each other"
m- / me-	beccer	"to announce"	mbeccer	"to announce to each other"
m- / me-	zer	"to see"	mzer	"to see each other"
m- / me-	cir	"to announce"	mcir	"to announce mutually"
my- (before vowel-initial stems)	ečč	"to eat"	myečč	"to eat together / each other"
my- (before vowel-initial stems)	erẓ	"to break"	myerẓ	"to break each other"
my- (before vowel-initial stems)	ger	"to put"	myeger	"to put mutually"
me- (with vowel insertion)	steqsi	"to question"	mesteqsi	"to question each other"
me- (with vowel insertion)	budd	"to wish"	mbudd	"to wish mutually"

- Passive: The passive is formed by prefixation to the primary verb stem. The most common passive markers are ttu- and ttwa-, although other prefixes such as tt-, mm(e)-, n- and nn(e)- also occur depending on the verb class. The table below illustrates representative passive formation.

Passive prefix	Primary verb	Meaning	Passive form	Meaning
ttu- / ttwa-	krez	"to plough"	ttwakrez	"to be ploughed"
ttu- / ttwa-	wet	"to strike"	ttwet	"to be struck"
ttu- / ttwa-	rki	"to knead"	ttwirki	"to be kneaded"
ttu- / ttwa-	lebbes	"to plaster"	ttulebbes	"to be plastered"
mm(e)-	zer	"to see"	mmzer	"to be seen"
mm(e)-	els	"to wear"	mmels	"to be worn"
mm(e)-	ečč	"to eat"	mmečč	"to be eaten"
n- / nne-	edem	"to damage"	nneɣdam	"to be damaged"
n- / nne-	zmi	"to press"	nnezmi	"to be pressed"

- Complex forms: obtained by combining two or more of the previous prefixes:

enɣ "to kill" → mmenɣ "to kill each other" → smenɣ "to make to kill each other"

Two prefixes can cancel each other:

enz "to be sold" → zzenz "to sell" → ttuzenz "to be sold" (ttuzenz = enz !!).

=== Agent noun ===
Every verb has a corresponding agent noun. In English it could be translated into verb+er. It is obtained by prefixing the verb with « am- » or with « an- » if the first letter is b / f / m / w (there are exceptions however).

- Examples:

ṭṭef "to hold" → anaṭṭaf "holder"
inig "to travel" → iminig "traveller"
eks "to graze" → ameksa "shepherd"

=== Action noun ===
Every verb has a corresponding action noun, which in English it could be translated into verb+ing:

ffer "to hide" → tuffra "hiding" (stem VI), « Tuffra n tidett ur telhi » — "Hiding the truth is bad".

There are 6 regular stems of forming action nouns, and the 7th is for quality verbs : (C for consonant, V for vowel)

Stem	Verb	Action noun
I	CVCV	aCVC
II	C(C)VC(C)	aC(C)VC(C)V
III	C(C)eCC	aC(C)eCCi
IV	(C)CaC(C)	a(C)CaC(C)i
V	C1C2eC3	aCCaC
VI	CCeC	tuCCCa
VII	iC1C2VC3	teC1C2eC3

- Examples:

ɣeẓẓ "to bite" → aɣẓaẓ
zdi "to be united" → azday
ini "to say" → timenna

=== Predicative particle "d" ===
The predicative particle "d" is an indispensable tool in speaking Kabyle, "d" is equivalent to both "it is + adjective" and "to be + adjective", but cannot be replaced by the verb "ili" (to be). It is always followed by a noun (free state).

Examples:

- D taqcict, "it's a girl".
- D nekk, "it's me".
- Nekk d argaz, "I'm a man".
- Idir d anelmad, "Idir is a student".
- Idir yella d anelmad, "Idir was a student".

The predicative particle "d" should not be confused with the particle of coordination "d"; indeed, the latter is followed by a noun at its annexed state while the first is always followed by a noun at its free state.

== Pronouns ==
=== Personal pronouns ===
Person	Singular	Plural
1st (m)	nekk / nekkini	nekni
1st (f)	nekk / nekkini	nekkenti
2nd (m)	kečč / keččini	kunwi / kenwi
2nd (f)	kemm / kemmini	kunnemti / kennemti
3rd (m)	netta / nettan / nettani	nutni / nitni
3rd (f)	nettat	nutenti / nitenti

Example : « Ula d nekk. » — "Me too."

=== Possessive pronouns ===
There are three types of possessive pronouns: isolated, suffixes, and those of names of relatives.

1-Isolated (or independent):

Person	Singular	Plural
1st (m)	inu	nneɣ
1st (f)	inu	nnteɣ
2nd (m)	inek	nwen
2nd (f)	inem	nkent
3rd (m)	ines	nsen
3rd (f)	ines	nsent

Isolated possessive pronouns can be placed before or after the possessed noun:

- After: « Axxam agi inu »— Lit. "House-this-my" or "This is my house"
- Before: « Inu wexxam agi » —Lit. "My-house-this" or "This is my house"; If the possessive pronoun comes before the possessed noun, then the possessed noun takes the annexed state.

2-Suffix: it comes after the possessed noun, and it is linked to it by a hyphen.

Person	Singular	Plural
1st (m)	-iw	-nneɣ
1st (f)	-iw	-nnteɣ
2nd (m)	-ik	-nwen
2nd (f)	-im	-nkent
3rd (m)	-is	-nsen
3rd (f)	-is	-nsent

Example : « Axxam-nneɣ. » — "Our house." (House-our)

3-Possessive pronouns of the names of relatives:

Person	Singular	Plural
1st (m)	∅	-tneɣ
1st (f)	∅	-nteɣ
2nd (m)	-k	-twen
2nd (f)	-m	-tkent
3rd (m)	-s	-tsen
3rd (f)	-s	-tsent

When the name of the relative does not have a possessive pronoun, it means by default "my", for example: ∅ baba "my father"; whereas baba-s means "his father" or "her father".

=== Pronouns of the verb ===
- Direct object

Person	Singular	Plural
1st (m)	(i)yi	ɣ / (y)aɣ / naɣ / (y)anaɣ
1st (f)	(i)yi	ɣ / (y)aɣ / tnaɣ / (y)anteɣ
2nd (m)	(i)k	(i)ken
2nd (f)	(i)kem	(i)kent
3rd (m)	(i)t	(i)ten
3rd (f)	(i)tt	(i)tent

Example : « Yuɣ-it. » — "He bought it." (He.bought-it)

- Indirect object

Person	Singular		Plural	
Person	Long form	Short form	Long form	Short form
1st (m)	(i)yi	yi	ɣ / (y)aɣ	ɣ
1st (f)	(i)yi	yi	ɣ / (y)aɣ	ɣ
2nd (m)	(y)ak	k	(y)awen	wen
2nd (f)	(y)am	m	(y)akent	kent
3rd (m)	(y)as	s	(y)asen	sen
3rd (f)	(y)as	s	(y)asent	sent

- Example : « Yenna-yas. » — "He said to him." (He.said-to.him)
- Complex example (Mixing indirect and direct object) : « Yefka-yas-t. » — "He gave it to him." (He.gave-to.him-it)

=== Demonstratives ===
There are three demonstratives, near-deictic ('this, these'), far-deictic ('that, those') and absence:

- Suffix: Used with a noun, example : « Axxam-agi» — "This house." (House-this).

Near-deictic		Far-deictic		Absence
Singular	Plural	Singular	Plural	Absence
(y)a / (y)agi	(y)agini	(y)ihin / (y)ihinna	(y)inna	nni

- Isolated : Used when we omit the subject we are speaking about : «Wagi yelha» — "This is nice." (This-is.nice)

	Near-deictic		Far-deictic		Absence	
	Singular	Plural	Singular	Plural	Singular	Plural
masculine	wa/ wagi/ wagini	wi/ wigi/ wigini	wihin / wihinna	wihid / wihidak widak-inna / wigad-inna widak-ihin / wigad-ihin	win / winna	wid / wid-nni widak / widak-nni wigad-nni
feminine	ta / tagi / tagini	ti / tigi / tigini	tihin / tihinna	tihid / tihidak tidak-inna / tigad-inna tidak-ihin / tigad-ihin	tin / tinna	tid / tid-nni tidak / tidak-nni tigad-nni

=== Numerotation ===
Only the first two numbers are Berber; for higher numbers, Arabic is used. They are yiwen (f. yiwet) "one", sin (f. snat) "two". The noun being counted follows it in the genitive: sin n yirgazen "two men".

"First" and "last" are respectively amezwaru and aneggaru (regular adjectives). Other ordinals are formed with the prefix wis (f. tis): wis sin "second (m.)", tis tlata "third (f.)", etc.

=== Prepositions ===
Prepositions precede their objects: « i medden » "to the people", « si temdint » "from the town". All words preceded by a preposition (at the exception of « s » and « ar », "towards", "until" ) take their annexed state.

Some prepositions have two forms : one is used with pronominal suffixes and the other form is used in all other contexts.

Also some of these prepositions have a corresponding relative pronoun (or interrogative), example:

« i » "for/to" → « iwumi » "to whom"
« Tefka aksum i wemcic » "she gave meat to the cat" → « Amcic iwumi tefka aksum » "The cat to whom she gave meat"

Kabyle prepositions
Preposition	With suffixes	Translation equivalent	Corresponding Relative pronoun	Translation equivalent
d	yid- / did-	'and, with, in the company of'	(w)ukud / wi d	'with whom'
i	—	'for, to' (dative)	iwumi / iwimi / imi / umi / mi	'to whom' (dative) / 'whose'
ɣer / ar	—	'to' (direction)	iɣer / ɣer way / (s)aniɣer / (s)awier / ɣer	'to' (direction)
s	—	'to' (direction)	sani	'to' (direction)
ɣur	—	'among'	(w)uɣur / ɣur	'among'
ɣef / af / f	fell-	'on; because of; about'	iɣef / ɣef way / ɣef wadeg / ɣef	'on what'
deg / g / di	—	'in'	ideg / deg way / deg waydeg / anda / deg	'where'
seg / si / g	—	'from'	iseg / seg way / ansi	'from where'
s	iss- / yiss- / yis-	'with, by means of, using' (instrumental)	s ways / s wacu / s / iss / is	'with what' (instrumental)
ger	gar-	'between'	—	—
n	—	'of'	—	—
nnig / sennig	—	'on top of'	—	—
ddaw / seddaw	—	'beneath, under'	—	—
ar	—	'until'	—	—
deffir	—	'behind'	—	—
zdat / zzat	—	'in front of'	—	—
am	—	'like, as'	—	—

=== Conjunctions ===
Conjunctions precede the verb: mi yiwweḍ "when he arrived", muqel ma yusa-d "see if he came".

== Bibliography ==
- Achab, R. : 1996 – La néologie lexicale berbère (1945–1995), Paris/Louvain, Editions Peeters, 1996.
- Achab, R. : 1998 – Langue berbère. Introduction à la notation usuelle en caractères latins, Paris, Editions Hoggar.
- F. Amazit-Hamidchi & M. Lounaci : Kabyle de poche, Assimil, France, ISBN 2-7005-0324-4
- Dallet, Jean-Marie. 1982. Dictionnaire kabyle–français, parler des At Mangellet, Algérie. Études etholinguistiques Maghreb–Sahara 1, ser. eds. Salem Chaker, and Marceau Gast. Paris: Société d’études linguistiques et anthropologiques de France.
- Hamid Hamouma. n.d. Manuel de grammaire berbère (kabyle). Paris: Edition Association de Culture Berbère.
- Kamal Nait-Zerrad. Grammaire moderne du kabyle, tajerrumt tatrart n teqbaylit. Editions KARTHALA, 2001. ISBN 978-2-84586-172-5
- Mammeri, M. : 1976 – Tajerrumt n tmaziɣt (tantala taqbaylit), Maspero, Paris.
- Naït-Zerrad, K. : 1994 – Manuel de conjugaison kabyle (le verbe en berbère), L’Harmattan, Paris.
- Naït-Zerrad, K. : 1995 – Grammaire du berbère contemporain, I – Morphologie, ENAG, Alger.
- Salem Chaker. 1983. Un parler berbere d'Algerie (Kabyle): syntax. Provence: Université de Provence.
- Tizi-Wwuccen. Méthode audio-visuelle de langue berbère (kabyle), Aix-en-Provence, Edisud, 1986.
