= Ali André Mécili =

Algerian politician

- Σli Andri Mesili
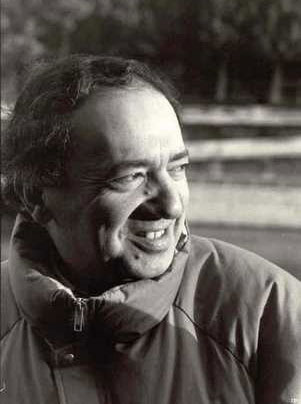
- Ali André Mécili in 1980.
- Born: Σli Andri Mesili; 1940; Koléa, French Algeria
- Died: Paris; 7 April 1987
- Resting place: Père Lachaise Cemetery (since 15 April 1987)
- Citizenship: Algerian; French
- Education: Sciences Po Aix
- Occupations: Politician, lawyer
- Political party: FFS

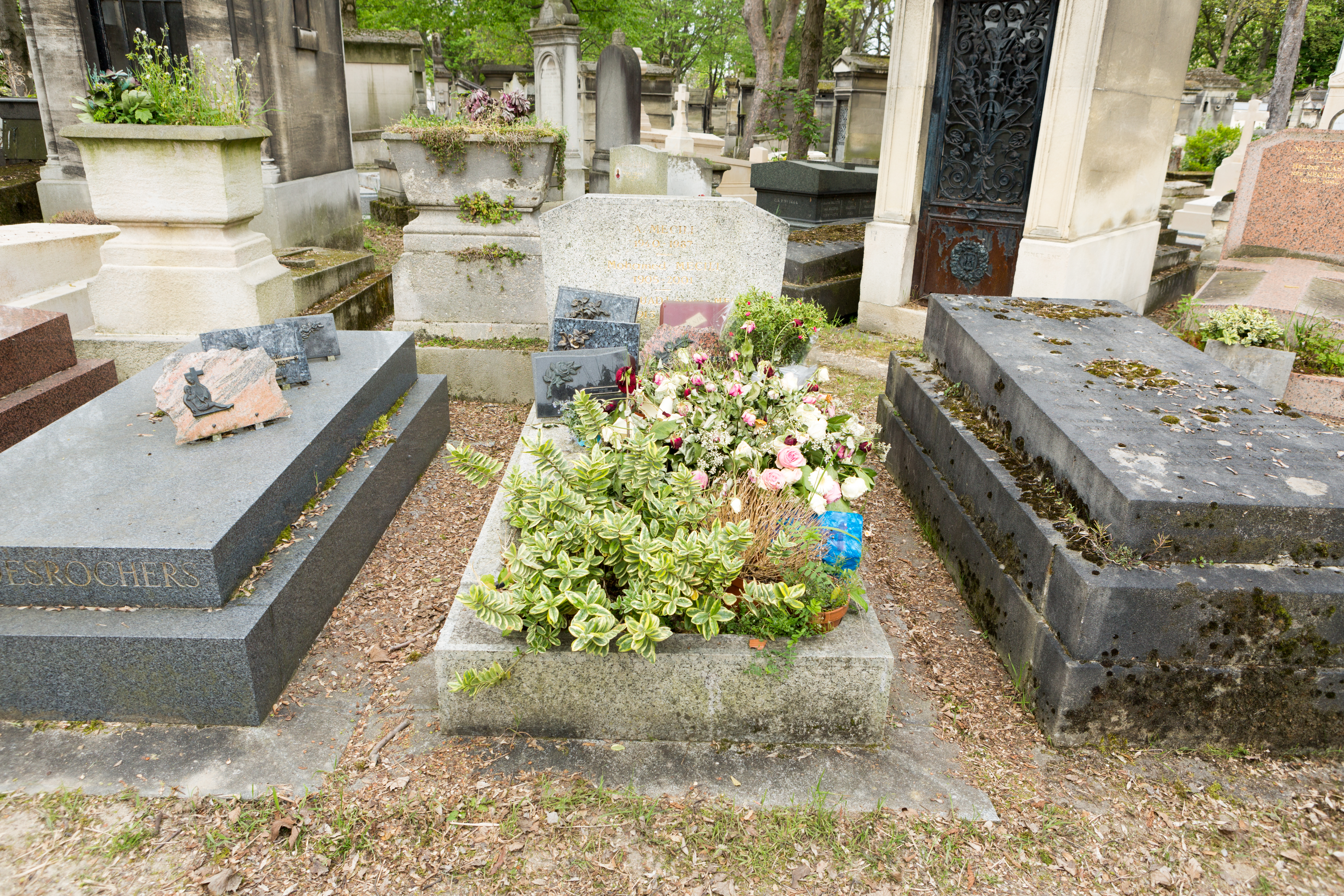
Tomb of Ali Mécili in the Père Lachaise Cemetery.

Ali André Mécili (kabyle : Σli Andri Mesili), born in 1940 in Koléa, Algeria, died assassinated in Paris on April 7, 1987, was an Algerian politician and French citizen.

Early in the Algerian liberation war, Mécili was one of the heads of the intelligence services of the NLA. After independence, he participated in creating of the Front des forces socialistes and in its action in favor of political pluralism in Algeria. Imprisoned, then immigrated to France, he became a lawyer there and resumed political activity alongside Hocine Aït Ahmed. Decisive to bring together the different factions of the Algerian opposition, he occupied a crucial position between them at the time of his death.

His assassination created the starting point of the Mécili affair, where his relatives and certain journalists denounced the prolonged stagnation of the investigation as the effect of a collusion of Algerian and French reasons of state.

== Biography ==
=== From 1940 to 1960, in colonial Algeria ===
André Mécili was born at the end of 1940. His parents were of Kabyle ethnic minority living in Koléa, in the Algerian Sahel. His father, originally from Djemâa Saharidj, was a rural custodian, his mother postmaster. They had acquired French nationality by naturalization: he himself achieved it by birth, by descent.

His studies lead the boy from Boufarik College to Ben Aknoun high school, where he joined the FLN cell. The small farm acquired by his parents in Chaïba was a refuge for the maquisards and the young Mécili was quickly involved in liaison tasks and providing safe places. For his comrades, he chose to be named Ali.
