= Eveline Safir Lavalette =

Algerian politician (1927–2014)

Member of the National People's Assembly (Algeria)
- Incumbent
- Assumed office 1964

Personal details
- Born: 1927 Rouïba, Algeria
- Died: 2014 (aged 86–87) Médéa, Algeria
- Party: National Liberation Front (Algeria)
- Spouse: Abdelkader Safir (m. 1967)
- Occupation: Revolutionary; activist; politician
- Known for: Participation in the Algerian War of Independence; memoir Juste Algérienne: Comme une tissure

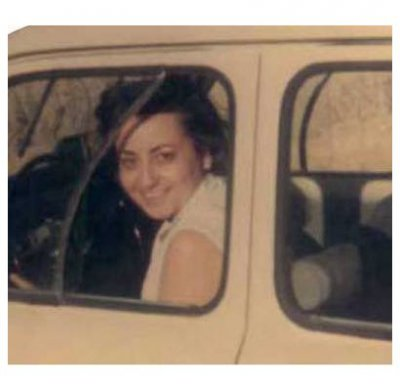

Eveline Safir Lavalette was an Algerian Pied-Noir revolutionary and activist during the Algerian War of Independence. She was born in 1927 in Rouïba. In 1951, she became active in the Algerian Youth Association for Social Action, and became an anti-poverty crusader. This began her interest in political affairs. She joined the National Liberation Front (Algeria) as an officer, distributing pamphlets and assisting with the publication of the Front's underground newspaper, El Moudjahid. She is famous for her arrest by French colonial forces in 1956, as documented in her autobiographical text Juste Algérienne: Comme une tissure. She was imprisoned and tortured until 1959, when she was released.

She was elected to the National Assembly in 1964, and played a major role in the formation of Algeria's education system. In 1967, she married journalist Abdelkader Safir, and in 1968 she joined the Ministry of Labor. In 2013, her autobiography was published; she died in 2014 in Médéa.

Her identity as a Pied-Noir created a unique situation for Lavalette. As descendants of French colonial settlers, many Pied-Noirs perpetrated the colonial oppression of indigenous Algerians—while some felt scape-goated. Lavalette was among the few who fought alongside Algerians in their struggle for independence. Hundreds of thousands of Pied-Noirs were displaced during the process of repatriation following Algerian Independence. Their autobiographies share a nostalgia for pre-war Algeria, as well as a common pain, grief, and melancholia. This is also true in Lavalette's memoir.

== Historical context ==
After 1848, Algeria was one of France's oldest and most politically important colonies. The Algerian War of Independence between France and the FLN between 1954 and 1962 was catalyzed when minority European settlers gained French citizenship over Muslim and Arab majorities. Algerians sought equality, agricultural reform, and eventual independence. In 1954, when Lavalette was 27 years old, Algerian militants formed the FLN and launched increasingly large-scale attacks. In response, the French displaced and destroyed whole villages while violently executing Algerian sympathizers.

The Battle of Algiers, a year-long street fight between rebel terrorist bombers and French security forces from 1956 to 1957, was a crucial point of conflict. During this time, Lavalette helped distribute pamphlets for and publish the FLN's underground newspaper, El Moudjahid. After she was caught in 1956, she was arrested, imprisoned, and tortured. She was then hospitalized for psychosis and subjected to electroshock and drug treatments, although it is unlikely that she actually suffered any mental illness. She was released in 1959 and returned to Algeria in the summer of 1962 as a member of the Algerian Constituent Assembly, later the Algerian National Assembly. Eventually, the fall of the Fourth Republic prompted France to withdraw from the war and grant Algerian Independence.

Women were central to Algerian resistance efforts. The FLN's strategic use of women in their bombings and attacks was a result of French stereotypes about Muslim women as innocent, submissive, and oppressed. When Algerian militants formed the FLN in 1954, thousands of women, including Lavalette, joined in their anticolonial struggle. Like other women at the time, but unlike other Pied-Noirs, Lavalette distributed resources (like pamphlets), transported messages, and provided food and housing to freedom fighters as they infiltrated rural mountain villages to kill French sympathizers and workers.

The Feminist movement of the 1940s combined with the Revolution gave Algerian women like Lavalette the confidence to challenge societal values, break social taboos, assert their independence, and showcase their political importance. Manipulating gendered expectations empowered them to control their identities and assert their independence. In Lavalette's case, she held power as an officer and fighter of the FLN and resisted French colonial abuse. She fought her oppression as a Pied-Noir by realizing her stories were valuable and interesting, which motivated her to break her silence.

== Memoir ==
Published a year before her death, Lavalette's memoir Juste Algérienne: Comme une tissure (Just Algerian: Like intersecting threads) is a collection of journal entries made over the course of her life. Through a combination of poetry and prose, Lavalette explores personal and national conflicts. A prominent feature is Lavalette's use of varying narration and structure. She strategically uses the third person "she" when referring to herself during her imprisonment but uses the first person "I" for other parts of her life. Some scholars believe that this reveals the needs to psychologically distance herself from her traumatic experiences. Lavalette indicates that it could also be an acknowledgement of a common struggle faced by Algerian women in the FLN: "Before 1962, I had said 'She' because this 'She' was a common subject in the grammatical sense of the word, characterizing an identical path, a bit like a single portrait of this lived unity in which all of us, companions, were with the FLN...".

Lavalette was hesitant to talk publicly about her trauma for fear she would not be believed. Similarly, many Algerian women were reluctant to share their experiences after decades of colonial abuse. She also explains her fears that she will submit to authorities and forget the beauty of the life she knew before the war. Nonetheless, her memoir conveys the intense emotional, psychological, and physical abuse suffered by colonial police. It is an important document to historical understandings of the Algerian War of Independence from a civilian perspective.

== Legacy and death ==
Following the death of her husband, increasing violence, and forced homelessness, Lavalette moved back to Médéa to live amongst her friends. She died in 2014, one year after publishing her memoir. Civilian's narratives such as Lavalette's are important because they explain the suffering of the general people who are not actively fighting in the war. Furthermore, her generation of women are particularly hesitant to publicly talk about their experiences due to their continued fights for equality under an Islamic Fundamentalist regime. Lavalette has explained her own reluctance to share her experiences for fear of violence. Eveline Safir Lavalette's importance, as both a fighter and an everyday citizen, explores the psychological impacts of the war, untold by common narratives of war that are male-centric and focused on political conflict instead of personal turmoil. As a result, her memoir has scholarly importance. She has been referenced by multiple researchers, scholars, and historians since her death in 2013.
