= Lydia Guirous =

French politician (born 1984)

Spokesperson of The Republicans
- In office 13 December 2017 – 23 October 2019
- In office 2 June 2015 – 6 January 2016

Personal details
- Born: 28 December 1984 (age 41)
- Party: The Republicans (since 2015)
- Other political affiliations: Union for a Popular Movement (until 2015)

Lydia Guirous (born 28 December 1984) is an Algerian-born French politician. She served as spokesperson of The Republicans from 2015 to 2016 and from 2017 to 2019. In 2015, she served as national secretary for republican values and secularism of the Union for a Popular Movement. From 2023 to 2025, she served as prefect delegate for equal opportunities of Gironde. In the 2019 European Parliament election, she was a candidate for member of the European Parliament. In the 2012 legislative election, she was a candidate for the National Assembly in Paris's 6th constituency.
