= General Union of Algerian Workers =

Main Algerian trade union

UGTA
- General Union of Algerian Workers
- الإتحاد العام للعمال الجزائريين
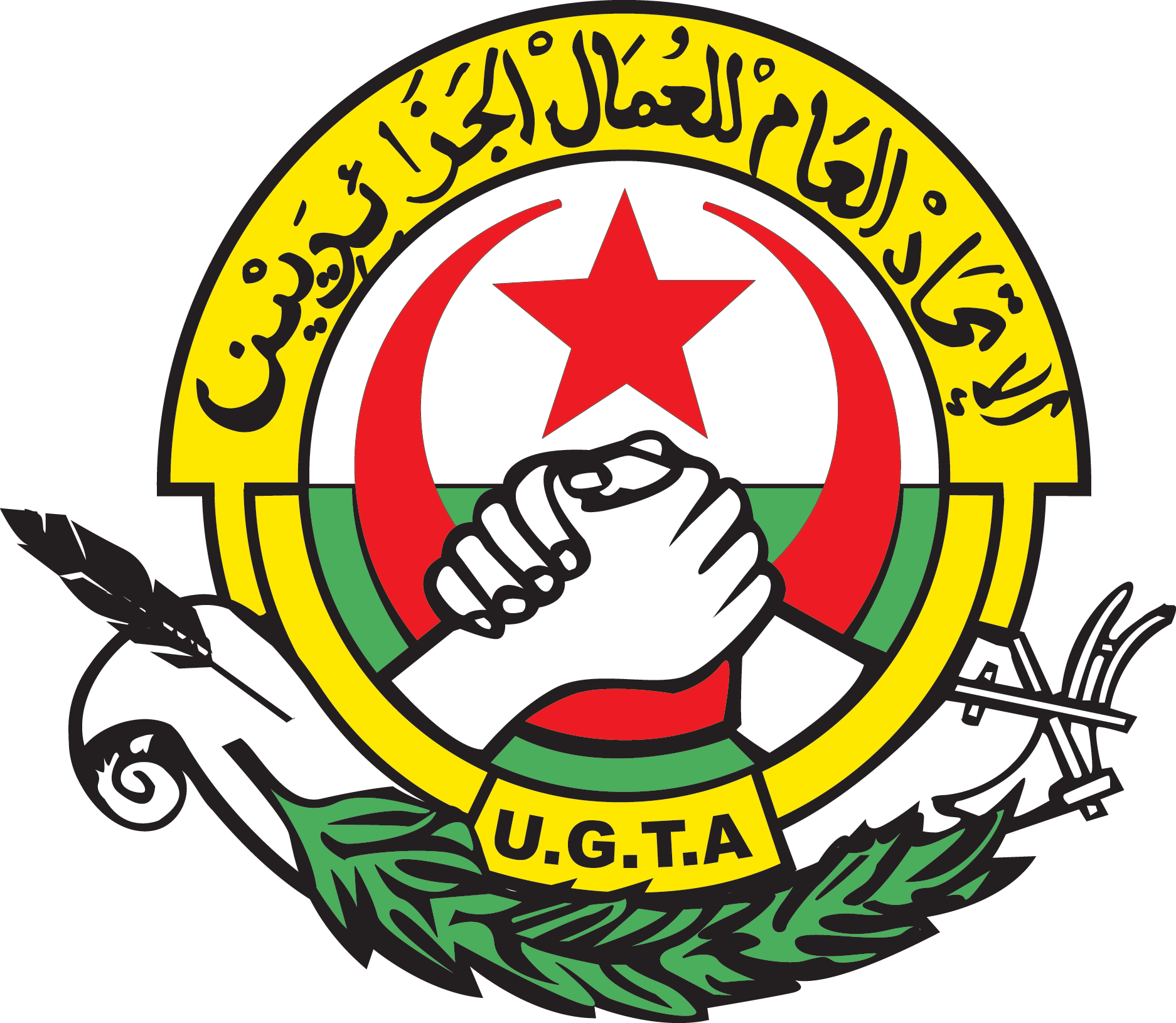
- Founded: February 24, 1956
- Founder: Aïssat Idir
- Headquarters: Algiers
- Location: Algeria
- Members: 2 million
- Secretary General: Amar Takdjout
- Affiliations: ICFTU African Regional Organisation
- Website: ugta-dz.com

The General Union of Algerian Workers (UGTA; Arabic: الإتحاد العام للعمال الجزائريين, romanized: al-Ittiḥād al-ʿĀm lil-ʿUmmāl al-Ǧazāʾiriyyīn, French: Union Générale des Travailleurs Algériens) is the main Algerian trade union, established February 24, 1956 with the objective of mobilizing Algerian labour against French colonial and capitalist interests. It was banned shortly afterwards, in May 1956.

The union continued to operate clandestinely, playing a notable role in the eight-day strike of 1957 and establishing an underground newspaper, L'Ouvrier algérien. It became effectively subordinated to the ruling party, the Front de Libération nationale (FLN), during the subsequent years of independence under a single-party socialist government, while welcoming the nationalization policy the government pursued.

In 1989, the government began to pursue a program of political liberalization, and a multiparty electoral system was rapidly installed. The UGTA took advantage of the new environment to establish some distance from the government, and oil and coal workers struck in March 1991, obtaining various concessions including price fixing.

This political experiment was interrupted in 1992 by the military, following an Islamist victory in the polls, and the Algerian Civil War began. The UGTA denounced the new government policy of economic liberalization under International Monetary Fund guidelines, forced on it by the untenable debt situation. It sided strongly with the military against the generally anti-socialist Islamists, and its leader, Abdelhak Benhamouda, was assassinated by the latter on January 28, 1997.

In 2000, the organization established a working group, the National Commission of Working Women, to address issues related to women's position.
