= List of political parties in Algeria =

Algeria has a multi-party system with numerous political parties, in which no one party often has a chance of gaining power alone, and parties must work with each other to form coalition governments. The Algerian Constitution of 1996 bans the formation of any party "founded on a religious, linguistic, racial, sex, corporatist or regional basis" or violating "the fundamental liberties, the fundamental values and components of the national identity, the national unity, the security and integrity of the national territory, the independence of the country and the People's sovereignty as well as the democratic and republican nature of the State."

In Arabic, French, and English, major Algerian political parties are typically referred to by the three or four initials of their French names. (The Movement of Society for Peace, which uses an Arabic acronym, is an exception.) In formal contexts, however, their full names are used.

== List ==
=== Parliamentary parties after 2021 election ===
Name	Abbr.	Leader	Political position	Ideology	APN	Council	Alliances
National Liberation Front; Arabic: جبهة التحرير الوطني, romanized: Jabhatu at-Taḥrīri al-Waṭanī; French: Front de libération nationale Berber languages: Tirni n Weslelli Aɣelnaw	FLN	Abdelkrim Benmbarek	Centre-left	Arab nationalism; Pan-Arabism; Algerian nationalism; Arab socialism; Anti-Zionism; Social democracy	60 / 407	30 / 144	SI (observer, 2013-19)
Movement of Society for Peace; Arabic: حركة مجتمع السلم, romanized: Harakat Mujtamaâ as-Silm; French: Mouvement de la société pour la paix Berber languages: ⵀⴰⵔⴰⴽⴰⵜ ⵎⵓⵊⵜⴰⵎⴰⵄ ⵙⵉⵍⵎ	MSP; Hims	Abdelaali Hassani Cherif	Right-wing	Sunni Islamism; Islamic democracy; Pan-Islamism; Economic liberalism; Social conservatism; Anti-Zionism	58 / 407	5 / 144	Muslim; Brotherhood
Democratic National Rally; Arabic: التجمع الوطني الديموقراطي, romanized: at-Tadschammuʿ al-Waṭanī ad-Dīmuqrāṭī; French: Rassemblement national démocratique Berber languages: Agraw aɣelnaw amagday	RND	Tayeb Zitouni	Centre to centre-right	Liberal conservatism; Algerian nationalism; Populism; Economic liberalism	80 / 407	90 / 144	CDI
Future Front; Arabic: جبهة المستقبل; French: Front El Moustakbal	FM	Fateh Boutbig	Centre	Algerian nationalism	48 / 407	1 / 144	
National Construction Movement; Arabic: حركة البناء الوطني, romanized: Harakat al-Bina' al-Watanii; French: Mouvement El-Bina	El-Bina	Abdelkader Bengrina	Right-wing	Islamic democracy Algerian nationalism	39 / 407	0 / 144	
Voice of the People; Arabic: حزب صوت الشعب; French: Parti La Voix du peuple	PVP	Lamine Osmani		National conservatism; Right-wing populism	3 / 407	0 / 144	
Good Governance Front; Arabic: جبهة الحكم الراشد; French: Front de la bonne gouvernance	FBG	Aissa Belhadi		Algerian nationalism; Social conservatism; Anti-immigration	2 / 407	0 / 144	
Justice and Development Front; Arabic: جبهة العدالة والتنمية; French: Front pour la justice et le développement	FJD	Abdallah Djaballah	Right-wing	Islamic democracy; Algerian nationalism; Social conservatism; Economic liberalism	2 / 407	0 / 144	
Freedom and Juctice Party; Arabic: حزب الحرية والعدالة; French: Parti de la liberté et de la justice	PLJ	Djamel Benziadi	Right-wing	Islamic democracy	2 / 407	0 / 144	
New Fajr Party; Arabic: حزب الفجر الجديد; French: Parti el Fadjr el Jadid	PFJ	Tahar Benbaïbeche	Right-wing	Right-wing nationalism; Conservatism	2 / 407	0 / 144	
New Generation; Arabic: جيل جديد, romanized: Jil Jadid; French: Jil Jadid	JJ	Soufiane Djilali	Centre-right	Liberal conservatism Reformism	1 / 407	0 / 144	
New Algeria Front; Arabic: جبهة الجزائر الجديدة; French: Front de l’Algérie nouvelle	FAN	Djamel Benabdessalem	Centre	Algerian nationalism; Militarism; Iranophilia	1 / 407	0 / 144	
Dignity Party; Arabic: حزب الكرامة, romanized: Hizb el-Karama; French: Parti Dignité	PD	Mohamed Eddaoui		Algerian nationalism; Personalism; Populism; Anti-Western sentiment	1 / 407	0 / 144	
Algerian National Front; Arabic: الجبهة الوطنية الجزائرية, romanized: Jabhah al-Waṭaniyyah al-Jazā'iriyyah; French: Front national algérien	FNA	Moussa Touati	Right-wing	National conservatism	1 / 407	0 / 144	

=== Parties that boycotted the last elections ===
Name	Abbr.	Leader	Political position	Ideology	APN	Council	Alliances
Socialist Forces Front; Arabic: جبهة القوى الاشتراكية; French: Front des forces socialistes Berber languages: Tirni Iɣallen Inemlayen	FFS; RƔN	Youcef Aouchiche	Centre-left	Social democracy; Algerianism; Berberism; Secularism; Democratic socialism	0 / 407	4 / 144	PA, SI
Movement for Democracy in Algeria; Arabic: الحركة من أجل الديمقراطية في الجزائر; French: Mouvement pour la démocratie en Algérie	MDA		Left-wing	Moderate Islamism; Islamic socialism; Progressivism; Arab nationalism; Algerian nationalism; Pan-Maghrebism; Anti-Zionism	0 / 407	0 / 144	—N/a
Democratic and Social Movement; Arabic: الحركة الديمقراطية والاجتماعية; French: Mouvement Démocratique et Social	MDS	Hamid Ferhi	Left-wing	Socialism; Secularism	0 / 407	0 / 144	FDA
Rally for Culture and Democracy; Arabic: التجمع من أجل الثقافة والديمقراطية; Berber languages: ⴰⴽⵔⴰⵓ ⵉ ⵉⴷⵍⴻⵙ ⴷ ⵜⵓⴽⴷⵓⵜ; French: Rassemblement pour la Culture et la Démocratie	RCD	Atmane Mazouz	Centre to Centre-left	Liberalism; Social liberalism; Berberism; Algerian nationalism; Secularism	0 / 407	0 / 144	FDA
Socialist Workers Party; Arabic: حزب العمال الاشتراكي; French: Parti socialiste des travailleurs Kabyle: Akabar Anemlay n Yixeddamen	PST		Far-left	Internationalism; Marxism; Trotskyism; Socialism; Communism; Feminism	0 / 407	0 / 144	FDA, FI
Workers' Party; Arabic: حزب العمال; Berber languages: Akabar Ixeddamen; French: Parti des travailleurs	PT	Louisa Hanoune	Far-left	Communism; Trotskyism; Proletarian internationalism	0 / 407	0 / 144	FDA, OJR

=== Other parties ===
- Algerian National Party (الحزب الوطني الجزائري, El-Hizb El-Watani El-Djazairy)
- Ahd 54
- Algerian Party for Democracy and Socialism (Parti Algérien pour la Démocratie et le Socialisme)
- Algerian Popular Movement (MPA)
- The Cause (Essabil)
- National Republican Alliance (ANR)
- Natural Law Party (Parti de la Loi Naturelle)
- National Party for Solidarity and Development (PNSD)

=== Parties not legally recognized ===
- Wafaa
- Arab Socialist Ba'ath Party

=== Illegal parties ===
- Hizb ut-Tahrir
- FIS: Islamic Salvation Front (Front Islamique du Salut)
- Movement for the Self-Determination of Kabylia

== See also ==
- Politics of Algeria
- Lists of political parties
