= 2022 Algerian Council of the Nation election =

- 5 February 2022
- 102 of 174 seats in the Council of the Nation; 88 seats needed for a majority
Party	Leader	Seats	+/–
FLN	El Fadhel Baadji	54	+2
RND	Tayeb Zitouni	22	−7
FM	Abdelaziz Belaïd	7	+5
El Binaa	Abdelkader Bengrina	5	+5
FFS	Youcef Aouchiche	4	0
PVP	Lamine Osmani	2	0
EFED	Tahar Benbaibeche	2	+1
MSP	Abderrazak Makri	1	+1
TAJ	Fatma Zohra Zerouati	1	+1
Independents	–	18	+10
This lists parties that won seats. See the complete results below.

Council of the Nation elections were held in Algeria on 5 February 2022 in order to renew half of the members of the upper house of parliament.

== Results ==
Party	Votes	%	Seats				
Party	Votes	%	2018 total	Up	Won	Total	+/–
National Liberation Front			52	23	25	54	+2
Democratic National Rally			29	18	11	22	–7
Socialist Forces Front			4	2	2	4	0
Future Front			2	0	5	7	+5
National Construction Movement			0	0	5	5	+5
Voice of the People			0	0	2	2	+2
El Fadjr El Djadid			1	1	2	2	+1
Movement of Society for Peace			0	0	1	1	+1
Rally for Hope for Algeria			0	0	1	1	+1
Other parties			0	0	0	0	–
Independents			8	4	14	18	+10
Appointed members			48	24	34	58	+10
Total			144	72	102	174	+30
Valid votes	24,151	92.45					
Invalid/blank votes	1,973	7.55					
Total votes	26,124	100.00					
Registered voters/turnout	27,151	96.22					
Source: Algerie Eco, Constitutional Council,
