= 2025 Algerian Council of the Nation election =

- 9 March 2025
- 87 of 174 seats in the Council of the Nation; 88 seats needed for a majority
Party	Leader	Seats	+/–
FLN	Abdelkrim Benmbarek	41	−13
RND	Mustapha Yahi	25	+3
FM	Fateh Boutbig	15	+8
El Binaa	Abdelkader Bengrina	7	+2
FFS	Youcef Aouchiche	4	0
MSP	Abdelaali Hassani Cherif	4	+3
PVP	Lamine Osmani	2	0
TAJ	Fatma Zohra Zerouati	2	+1
New Dawn	Tahar Benbaibeche	1	−1
Independents	–	15	−3
This lists parties that won seats. See the complete results below.

Council of the Nation elections were held in Algeria on 9 March 2025 in order to renew 87 of the 174 members of the upper house of parliament.

== Electoral system ==
Council of the Nation consists of 174 members, half of which are renewed every three years for six-year terms. Of this total, two-thirds or 116 seats are elected by indirect first-past-the-post vote in one round by an electoral college composed of members of wilaya assemblies and communal assemblies in 58 electoral districts based on the boundaries of the wilayas, with two seats per wilaya. Candidates must be at least thirty-five years old, and be members of these assemblies, which totals approximately 15,000 elected representatives. The remaining third (58 seats) are appointed by the president based on their scientific, cultural, professional, economic and social skills.

== Results ==
The members elected during the 2018 partial renewal completed their six-year terms, totaling 72 members, including 24 presidential appointees from the presidential third. In addition, 10 members representing the ten newly created provinces, who had been elected in 2022, were included in the 2028 partial renewal after being selected by lot, together with 29 members appointed by the President of the Republic to the presidential third. As a result, the members eligible for the 2025 partial renewal consisted of those elected during the 2018 partial renewal, together with 10 members elected in the ten newly created provinces in 2022 who were selected by lot to complete the staggered renewal cycle. (Note: The members subject to the 2025 partial renewal were distributed by political affiliation as follows: National Liberation Front: 32 members (29 whose six-year terms expired + 3 selected by lot).; Democratic National Rally: 11 members (11 whose six-year terms expired + 0 selected by lot).; Independents: 9 members (4 whose six-year terms expired + 5 selected by lot).; Future Front: 2 members (2 whose six-year terms expired + 0 selected by lot).; Socialist Forces Front: 2 members (2 whose six-year terms expired + 0 selected by lot).; National Construction Movement: 1 member (0 whose six-year terms expired + 1 selected by lot).; New Dawn: 1 member (0 whose six-year terms expired + 1 selected by lot).)

Graph of the party split among 174 seats.
Party	Votes	%	Seats				
Party	Votes	%	2022 total	Up	Won	Total	+/–
National Liberation Front			54	32	19	41	-13
Democratic National Rally			22	11	14	25	+3
Future Front			7	2	10	15	+8
National Construction Movement			5	1	3	7	+2
Socialist Forces Front			4	2	2	4	0
Movement of Society for Peace			1	0	3	4	+3
Voice of the People			2	0	0	2	0
Rally for Hope for Algeria			1	0	1	2	+1
New Dawn			2	1	0	1	-1
Other parties			0	0	0	0	0
Independents			18	9	6	15	–3
Appointed members			58	29	29	58	0
Total			174	87	87	174	0
Valid votes	24,183	92.19					
Invalid/blank votes	2,048	7.81					
Total votes	26,231	100.00					
Registered voters/turnout	27,236	96.31					
Source: Official Algerian Journal
