= 2026 Algerian parliamentary election =

- 2 July 2026
- All 407 seats in the People's National Assembly; 204 seats needed for a majority
- Turnout: 20.88% (▼2.11pp)
Party	Leader	Vote %	Seats	+/–
FLN	Abdelkrim Benmbarek	17.57	91	−7
RND	Monder Bouden	15.31	74	+16
FM	Fateh Boutbig	12.50	56	+8
MSP	Abdelaali Hassani Cherif	10.30	43	−22
El Binaa	Abdelkader Bengrina	8.98	40	+1
PVP	Lamine Osmani	5.29	16	+13
FFS	Youcef Aouchiche	2.29	12	New
El Karama	Mohamed Eddaoui	2.19	5	+3
PFD	Tahat Benbaibeche	1.93	6	+4
TAJ	Fatma Zohra Zerouati	1.86	3	+3
PLJ	Djamel Benziadi	1.66	6	+4
PT	Louisa Hanoune	1.43	3	New
FJD	Abdallah Djaballah	0.90	4	+2
MRI	Mohamed Douibi	0.81	2	+2
Jil Jadid	Lakhdar Amokrane	0.79	3	+2
FAN	Djamel Benabdessalem	0.77	1	0
RCD	Atmane Mazouz	0.73	4	New
ANR	Hamza Latreche	0.47	1	+1
FBG	Aissa Belhadi	0.43	1	−1
FCL	Najia Wajdi Damarji	0.32	1	+1
PRA	Kamal Ben Salem	0.25	1	+1
PUND	Mohamed Dhif	0.16	1	+1
Independents	–	5.69	33	−51
This lists parties that won seats. See the complete results below.
Seats won by constituency
Prime Minister before
Sifi Ghrieb; Independent

Parliamentary elections were held in Algeria on 2 July 2026.

== Background ==
The 2021 parliamentary elections saw voter boycotts and low turnout, with the FLN winning a plurality of seats. Abdelmadjid Tebboune was also re-elected for a second term as the president of Algeria in the 2024 presidential election.

Algeria went through two separate diplomatic rows in 2025: The first with the Alliance of Sahel States over the downing of a Malian drone on 31 March near Tin Zaouatine, and the second with France relating to the expulsion of French officials following the arrest of an Algerian consular official. A second set of French diplomats were expelled in May 2025 after Algeria accused France of breaking procedures relating to the appointments of the new officials.

In March 2026, during the month of Ramadan, Algerians struggled with a cost-of-living crisis, with violence breaking out in marketplaces and families struggling to afford rising food prices due to the depreciation of the dinar.

== Electoral system ==
Algeria has a bicameral parliament of which the People's National Assembly is the lower house. This is made up of 407 seats filled by proportional representation in 77 constituencies. These consist of the 69 provinces (wilayas) of the country and eight electoral zones representing the diaspora. Each constituency is allocated a number of seats according to its population: one seat per segment of 120,000 inhabitants, plus one seat for any remaining segment of 60,000 inhabitants, with a minimum of three seats per constituency. The lists are open, with preferential voting, without mixing, and an electoral threshold of 5% of the votes cast, and after counting of the votes, the distribution of seats is done according to the method known as "the strongest remainder".

The distribution of members per constituency is the following:

Seats	Constituencies
31	Algiers ^{(-3)}
17	Sétif ^{(+2)}
16	Oran ^{(-1)}
11	Chlef, Batna ^{(-1)}, Blida ^{(-1)}, Tizi Ouzou
10	Skikda
9	Béjaïa, Tlemcen ^{(-1)}, Constantine ^{(-2)}, Boumerdès, Aïn Defla ^{(+1)}
8	Bouira ^{(+1)}, Tiaret ^{(-1)}, Mostaganem, Mascara, Mila, Relizane
7	Oum El Bouaghi, Jijel ^{(+1)}, M'Sila ^{(-4)}, Bordj Bou Arréridj, El Oued ^{(+1)}, Tipaza ^{(+1)}
6	Biskra, Tébessa ^{(-1)}, Djelfa ^{(-7)}, Sidi Bel Abbès, Annaba ^{(-1)}, Médéa ^{(-2)}
5	Guelma, Khenchela ^{(+1)}
4	Laghouat ^{(-2)}, Saïda, Ouargla ^{(+1)}, El Tarf, Souk Ahras ^{(-1)}, Aïn Témouchent, Ghardaïa ^{(+1)}, Touggourt ^{(+1)}, Bou Saâda ^{(+4)}
3	Adrar, El Bayadh, Tissemsilt, Naâma, Ksar El Boukhari ^{(+3)}, Aïn Oussera ^{(+3)}
2	Béchar ^{(-1)}, Tamanrasset ^{(-1)}, Illizi ^{(-1)}, Tindouf ^{(-1)}, Timimoun ^{(-1)}, Bordj Badji Mokhtar ^{(-1)}, Ouled Djellal ^{(-1)}, Béni Abbès ^{(-1)}, In Salah ^{(-1)}, In Guezzam ^{(-1)}, Djanet ^{(-1)}, El M'Ghair ^{(+2)}, El Menia ^{(+2)}, Aflou ^{(+2)}, El Abiodh Sidi Cheikh ^{(+2)}, El Aricha ^{(+2)}, El Kantara ^{(+2)}, Barika ^{(+2)}, Bir El Ater ^{(+2)}, Ksar Chellala ^{(+2)}, Messaad ^{(+1)}
2	Diaspora districts: First Region (France 1) (Note: Includes the consulates of Paris, Nantes, Bobigny, Crétéil, and Pontoise.), Second Region (France 2) (Note: Includes the consulates of Lille, Strasbourg, Metz, Nantes, Besançon, and Grenoble.), Third Region (France 3) (Note: Includes the consulates of Lyon, Saint-Etienne, Marseille, Nice, Montpellier, Toulouse and Bordeaux.), Fifth Region (North America and Latin America)
1	Diaspora districts: Fourth Region (Maghreb and rest of Africa), Sixth Region (Middle East, rest of Asia, and Oceania), Seventh Region (Northern Europe) (Note: Includes the consulates of Germany, Belgium, United Kingdom, Sweden, Denmark, Finland, Norway, Russia, Ukraine, Ireland, Netherlands, Poland, Czech Republic, and Slovakia.), Eight Region (Southern Europe) (Note: Includes the consulates of Portugal, Spain, Italy, Switzerland, Austria, Hungary, Croatia, Serbia, Bosnia and Herzegovina, Slovenia, Greece, Romania, Bulgaria and Turkey.)

== Results ==
The turnout of the election was 21%, another record low for elections in Algeria. Provisional results revealed that the FLN secured 90 of the 407 seats, maintaining its minority government with the RND.

Graph of the party split among 407 seats.
Party	Votes	%	Seats	+/–
National Liberation Front	736,395	17.57	91	–7
Democratic National Rally	641,623	15.31	74	+16
Future Front	523,915	12.50	56	+8
Movement of Society for Peace	431,743	10.30	43	–22
National Construction Movement	376,283	8.98	40	+1
Voice of the People	221,726	5.29	16	+13
Socialist Forces Front	96,111	2.29	12	New
Dignity Party	91,890	2.19	5	+4
New Dawn	80,871	1.93	6	+4
Rally for Hope for Algeria	78,026	1.86	3	+3
Freedom and Justice Party	69,699	1.66	6	+4
Workers' Party	59,991	1.43	3	New
Justice and Development Front	37,583	0.90	4	+2
Renaissance Movement	34,136	0.81	2	+2
Jil Jadid	33,150	0.79	3	+2
New Algeria Front	32,092	0.77	1	–1
Rally for Culture and Democracy	30,510	0.73	4	New
National Republican Alliance	19,723	0.47	1	+1
Good Governance Front	17,876	0.43	1	0
Free Citizens' Front	13,229	0.32	1	+1
Party of Algerian Renewal	10,353	0.25	1	+1
National Unity and Development Party	6,826	0.16	1	+1
Minor independent lists that won seats	238,293	5.69	33	–51
Other parties and independent lists	308,467	7.36	0	–
Total	4,190,511	100.00	407	0
Valid votes	4,190,511	81.17		
Invalid/blank votes	972,319	18.83		
Total votes	5,162,830	100.00		
Registered voters/turnout	24,727,041	20.88		
Source: Official Algerian Journal

=== By constituency ===
Constituency	Electorate	Turnout		Valid votes		Deputies	
1 - Adrar	165,960	40.54%	67,286	84.33%	56,744	FLN	Abdelmadjid Abellah
1 - Adrar	165,960	40.54%	67,286	84.33%	56,744	MSP	Abdelkadir Ben Abdelkarim
1 - Adrar	165,960	40.54%	67,286	84.33%	56,744	RND	Salah Abdedaiem
2 - Chlef	729,124	17.39%	126,783	83.71%	106,128	RND	Ibrahim Hadj Henni
2 - Chlef	729,124	17.39%	126,783	83.71%	106,128	RND	Fodhil Benaboura
2 - Chlef	729,124	17.39%	126,783	83.71%	106,128	RND	Moufida Dendane
2 - Chlef	729,124	17.39%	126,783	83.71%	106,128	RND	Fettah Fatmi
2 - Chlef	729,124	17.39%	126,783	83.71%	106,128	Binaa	Farid Maskri
2 - Chlef	729,124	17.39%	126,783	83.71%	106,128	Binaa	Djelloul Berkane
2 - Chlef	729,124	17.39%	126,783	83.71%	106,128	MSP	Kheireddine Nourine-Elaid
2 - Chlef	729,124	17.39%	126,783	83.71%	106,128	MSP	Maamar Omar
2 - Chlef	729,124	17.39%	126,783	83.71%	106,128	FLN	Omar Lehlouh
2 - Chlef	729,124	17.39%	126,783	83.71%	106,128	FLN	Fayçal Moussa-Boudjelthia
2 - Chlef	729,124	17.39%	126,783	83.71%	106,128	FM	Sofiane Ayachi
3 - Laghouat	197,023	32.07%	63,177	81.50%	51,489	RND	Abdeldjebbar Tidjani
3 - Laghouat	197,023	32.07%	63,177	81.50%	51,489	FM	Moussa Khouiled
3 - Laghouat	197,023	32.07%	63,177	81.50%	51,489	FLN	Abdallah Belboul
3 - Laghouat	197,023	32.07%	63,177	81.50%	51,489	PVP	Abdelkader Lahouel
4 - Oum El Bouaghi	426,448	19.68%	83,916	83.28%	69,883	FM	Mohammed-Lakhdar Khiari
4 - Oum El Bouaghi	426,448	19.68%	83,916	83.28%	69,883	FM	Habiba Tarioulet
4 - Oum El Bouaghi	426,448	19.68%	83,916	83.28%	69,883	RND	Imad Toureche
4 - Oum El Bouaghi	426,448	19.68%	83,916	83.28%	69,883	Binaa	Riyadh Chenikhar
4 - Oum El Bouaghi	426,448	19.68%	83,916	83.28%	69,883	FLN	Hicham Khellil
4 - Oum El Bouaghi	426,448	19.68%	83,916	83.28%	69,883	MSP	Abdelyamine Annab
4 - Oum El Bouaghi	426,448	19.68%	83,916	83.28%	69,883	IND	Lekhemissi Louaar
5 - Batna	575,627	23.77%	136,813	89.07%	121,862	FM	Amin Baazi
5 - Batna	575,627	23.77%	136,813	89.07%	121,862	FM	Slimane Smaili
5 - Batna	575,627	23.77%	136,813	89.07%	121,862	FM	Salim Azzouzi
5 - Batna	575,627	23.77%	136,813	89.07%	121,862	RND	Mihoub Koutti
5 - Batna	575,627	23.77%	136,813	89.07%	121,862	RND	Djamel Benzahira
5 - Batna	575,627	23.77%	136,813	89.07%	121,862	RND	Sihame Regaa
5 - Batna	575,627	23.77%	136,813	89.07%	121,862	FLN	Smail Hasroumi
5 - Batna	575,627	23.77%	136,813	89.07%	121,862	FLN	Abdelhafid Brima
5 - Batna	575,627	23.77%	136,813	89.07%	121,862	Binaa	Mekki Meddour
5 - Batna	575,627	23.77%	136,813	89.07%	121,862	Binaa	Abdallah Bouhata
5 - Batna	575,627	23.77%	136,813	89.07%	121,862	IND	Khalil Aissaoui
6 - Béjaïa	562,095	15.05%	84,593	89.64%	75,827	FFS	Bachir Barkat
6 - Béjaïa	562,095	15.05%	84,593	89.64%	75,827	FFS	Azedine Aissaoui
6 - Béjaïa	562,095	15.05%	84,593	89.64%	75,827	FFS	Abdenour Derguini
6 - Béjaïa	562,095	15.05%	84,593	89.64%	75,827	RCD	Mohamed Labdouci
6 - Béjaïa	562,095	15.05%	84,593	89.64%	75,827	RCD	Aissa Merah
6 - Béjaïa	562,095	15.05%	84,593	89.64%	75,827	IND	Farid Brahami
6 - Béjaïa	562,095	15.05%	84,593	89.64%	75,827	FLN	Naim Boudjemline
6 - Béjaïa	562,095	15.05%	84,593	89.64%	75,827	IND	Fouad Haddad
6 - Béjaïa	562,095	15.05%	84,593	89.64%	75,827	RND	Touhami Bordjihane
7 - Biskra	371,551	26.11%	97,026	85.82%	83,266	RND	Amor Messaoudi
7 - Biskra	371,551	26.11%	97,026	85.82%	83,266	MSP	Mehdi Atallah
7 - Biskra	371,551	26.11%	97,026	85.82%	83,266	FLN	Adel Youb Sekkai
7 - Biskra	371,551	26.11%	97,026	85.82%	83,266	FM	El Hadj Bettaybi
7 - Biskra	371,551	26.11%	97,026	85.82%	83,266	Karama	Abderrahmane Noui
7 - Biskra	371,551	26.11%	97,026	85.82%	83,266	IND	Noureddine Mazouzi
8 - Béchar	187,362	27.60%	51,703	55.53%	28,710	FLN	Ahmed Abdel Hakim Yarfaa
8 - Béchar	187,362	27.60%	51,703	55.53%	28,710	PT	Latifa Mousli
9 - Blida	704,997	17.38%	122,533	71.61%	87,742	FLN	Mohamed Boukedjemar
9 - Blida	704,997	17.38%	122,533	71.61%	87,742	FLN	Abdelkader Mebarki
9 - Blida	704,997	17.38%	122,533	71.61%	87,742	FLN	Ahmed Amier
9 - Blida	704,997	17.38%	122,533	71.61%	87,742	MSP	M'Hamed Elaichi
9 - Blida	704,997	17.38%	122,533	71.61%	87,742	MSP	Abderrezak Bousetta
9 - Blida	704,997	17.38%	122,533	71.61%	87,742	RND	Abdelkader Sabkha
9 - Blida	704,997	17.38%	122,533	71.61%	87,742	Binaa	Ishak Ouserir
9 - Blida	704,997	17.38%	122,533	71.61%	87,742	IND	Ghoufran Hammouche
9 - Blida	704,997	17.38%	122,533	71.61%	87,742	FM	Mohamed-Amine Bouzid
9 - Blida	704,997	17.38%	122,533	71.61%	87,742	PVP	Mohamed Ouserir
9 - Blida	704,997	17.38%	122,533	71.61%	87,742	IND	Rafik Dis Ameur
10 - Bouira	548,166	17.14%	93,954	69.63%	65,417	FLN	Rachid Achit
10 - Bouira	548,166	17.14%	93,954	69.63%	65,417	FLN	Mohammed Salem
10 - Bouira	548,166	17.14%	93,954	69.63%	65,417	RND	Miloud Nechadi
10 - Bouira	548,166	17.14%	93,954	69.63%	65,417	RND	Abderachid Zouggagh
10 - Bouira	548,166	17.14%	93,954	69.63%	65,417	Binaa	Abdelkrim Rai
10 - Bouira	548,166	17.14%	93,954	69.63%	65,417	Binaa	Mohamed Smail
10 - Bouira	548,166	17.14%	93,954	69.63%	65,417	FFS	Daou Zemmour
10 - Bouira	548,166	17.14%	93,954	69.63%	65,417	IND	Salah Sadelli
11 - Tamanrasset	122,879	45.06%	55,373	80.00%	44,300	FM	Mouloud Habnassi
11 - Tamanrasset	122,879	45.06%	55,373	80.00%	44,300	FLN	Ahmed Gmama
12 - Tébessa	412,887	25.42%	104,966	85.34%	89,576	RND	Hamza Amrane
12 - Tébessa	412,887	25.42%	104,966	85.34%	89,576	FLN	Nacer-Eddine Djadaoun
12 - Tébessa	412,887	25.42%	104,966	85.34%	89,576	MSP	Djaafar Chorfi
12 - Tébessa	412,887	25.42%	104,966	85.34%	89,576	FM	Belgacem Mesnadi
12 - Tébessa	412,887	25.42%	104,966	85.34%	89,576	PLJ	Chaouki Melkia
12 - Tébessa	412,887	25.42%	104,966	85.34%	89,576	Binaa	Khedidja Serradj
13 - Tlemcen	721,285	17.21%	124,140	75.53%	93,757	RND	Mohammed Malek
13 - Tlemcen	721,285	17.21%	124,140	75.53%	93,757	RND	Feth Allah Cheddad
13 - Tlemcen	721,285	17.21%	124,140	75.53%	93,757	FLN	Salah Eddine Koraib
13 - Tlemcen	721,285	17.21%	124,140	75.53%	93,757	FLN	Abdelmalek Charef
13 - Tlemcen	721,285	17.21%	124,140	75.53%	93,757	MSP	Noureddine Belhouari
13 - Tlemcen	721,285	17.21%	124,140	75.53%	93,757	PVP	Hemza Mesmoudi
13 - Tlemcen	721,285	17.21%	124,140	75.53%	93,757	FCL	Sami Boudina
13 - Tlemcen	721,285	17.21%	124,140	75.53%	93,757	FM	Redouane Lahcene
13 - Tlemcen	721,285	17.21%	124,140	75.53%	93,757	Binaa	Mekki Hamed
14 - Tiaret	513,886	20.06%	103,072	81.71%	84,217	RND	Mohammed Ben Zidene Chadli
14 - Tiaret	513,886	20.06%	103,072	81.71%	84,217	RND	Abdeldjalil Feghouli
14 - Tiaret	513,886	20.06%	103,072	81.71%	84,217	FLN	Yesin Senouci
14 - Tiaret	513,886	20.06%	103,072	81.71%	84,217	FM	Nasredine Aouinet
14 - Tiaret	513,886	20.06%	103,072	81.71%	84,217	MSP	Belalia Bekhedda
14 - Tiaret	513,886	20.06%	103,072	81.71%	84,217	Binaa	Mohamed Youcefi
14 - Tiaret	513,886	20.06%	103,072	81.71%	84,217	IND	Mihoub Kadari
14 - Tiaret	513,886	20.06%	103,072	81.71%	84,217	ANR	Yassine Benasla
15 - Tizi Ouzou	694,152	15.67%	108,769	90.32%	98,244	FFS	Youcef Sid Ali
15 - Tizi Ouzou	694,152	15.67%	108,769	90.32%	98,244	FFS	Mohamed Arab Amiar
15 - Tizi Ouzou	694,152	15.67%	108,769	90.32%	98,244	FFS	Ferhat Sadoud
15 - Tizi Ouzou	694,152	15.67%	108,769	90.32%	98,244	IND	Yassine Aissiouane
15 - Tizi Ouzou	694,152	15.67%	108,769	90.32%	98,244	IND	Saadi Akmoussi
15 - Tizi Ouzou	694,152	15.67%	108,769	90.32%	98,244	RCD	Hakim Tchatchi
15 - Tizi Ouzou	694,152	15.67%	108,769	90.32%	98,244	RCD	Rachid Hassani
15 - Tizi Ouzou	694,152	15.67%	108,769	90.32%	98,244	RND	Abdenour Belarbi
15 - Tizi Ouzou	694,152	15.67%	108,769	90.32%	98,244	IND	Rabah Brahimi
15 - Tizi Ouzou	694,152	15.67%	108,769	90.32%	98,244	Jil Jadid	Lyazid Nait Mouloud
15 - Tizi Ouzou	694,152	15.67%	108,769	90.32%	98,244	IND	Lekhdher Belkadi
16 - Algiers	1,941,097	10.89%	211,305	69.65%	147,175	FLN	Abdelbassat Ketfi
16 - Algiers	1,941,097	10.89%	211,305	69.65%	147,175	FLN	Chahrazed Benboulaid
16 - Algiers	1,941,097	10.89%	211,305	69.65%	147,175	FLN	Smail Debeche
16 - Algiers	1,941,097	10.89%	211,305	69.65%	147,175	FLN	Farid Krache
16 - Algiers	1,941,097	10.89%	211,305	69.65%	147,175	FLN	Imane Fergani
16 - Algiers	1,941,097	10.89%	211,305	69.65%	147,175	FLN	Amar-Zoubir Saidi
16 - Algiers	1,941,097	10.89%	211,305	69.65%	147,175	FLN	Khalida Boufedeche
16 - Algiers	1,941,097	10.89%	211,305	69.65%	147,175	FLN	Rabah Touimer
16 - Algiers	1,941,097	10.89%	211,305	69.65%	147,175	FM	Mohamed Nadjib Bourbia
16 - Algiers	1,941,097	10.89%	211,305	69.65%	147,175	FM	Ibtissam Mostefaoui
16 - Algiers	1,941,097	10.89%	211,305	69.65%	147,175	FM	Leila Ouakli
16 - Algiers	1,941,097	10.89%	211,305	69.65%	147,175	FM	Mohamed Bouzidi
16 - Algiers	1,941,097	10.89%	211,305	69.65%	147,175	FM	Mohammed Bouallag
16 - Algiers	1,941,097	10.89%	211,305	69.65%	147,175	FM	Mohamed Bouchareb
16 - Algiers	1,941,097	10.89%	211,305	69.65%	147,175	RND	Mohamed Bessakhi
16 - Algiers	1,941,097	10.89%	211,305	69.65%	147,175	RND	Nadjib Mebarki
16 - Algiers	1,941,097	10.89%	211,305	69.65%	147,175	RND	Mohamed Ratni
16 - Algiers	1,941,097	10.89%	211,305	69.65%	147,175	RND	Fatima Zohra Bensafi
16 - Algiers	1,941,097	10.89%	211,305	69.65%	147,175	RND	Meriem Chehih
16 - Algiers	1,941,097	10.89%	211,305	69.65%	147,175	MSP	Amar Dherra
16 - Algiers	1,941,097	10.89%	211,305	69.65%	147,175	MSP	Bachir Brahmi
16 - Algiers	1,941,097	10.89%	211,305	69.65%	147,175	MSP	Rabah Belkhiri
16 - Algiers	1,941,097	10.89%	211,305	69.65%	147,175	MSP	Ali Mostefaoui
16 - Algiers	1,941,097	10.89%	211,305	69.65%	147,175	PVP	Salah Eddine Fillali
16 - Algiers	1,941,097	10.89%	211,305	69.65%	147,175	PVP	Lynda Kouidri
16 - Algiers	1,941,097	10.89%	211,305	69.65%	147,175	PVP	Smaine Hammani
16 - Algiers	1,941,097	10.89%	211,305	69.65%	147,175	FJD	Amar Menouar
16 - Algiers	1,941,097	10.89%	211,305	69.65%	147,175	FJD	Brahim Mahamedi
16 - Algiers	1,941,097	10.89%	211,305	69.65%	147,175	FJD	Abdelkader Belahcene
16 - Algiers	1,941,097	10.89%	211,305	69.65%	147,175	FFS	Mohand Amokrane Salah Mansour
16 - Algiers	1,941,097	10.89%	211,305	69.65%	147,175	FFS	Ahmed Djeddai
17 - Djelfa	362,467	23.61%	85,593	70.34%	60,209	RND	Doha Aiat Ellah Boulanouar
17 - Djelfa	362,467	23.61%	85,593	70.34%	60,209	RND	Abdelbaki Harfouche
17 - Djelfa	362,467	23.61%	85,593	70.34%	60,209	FLN	Mohamed Orabi
17 - Djelfa	362,467	23.61%	85,593	70.34%	60,209	PUND	Naas Zahout
17 - Djelfa	362,467	23.61%	85,593	70.34%	60,209	MSP	Ahmed Borhane Eddine Lahoual
17 - Djelfa	362,467	23.61%	85,593	70.34%	60,209	Binaa	Ahmed Bengourina
18 - Jijel	446,306	25.90%	115,609	85.09%	98,373	FM	Abdenour Bousbia
18 - Jijel	446,306	25.90%	115,609	85.09%	98,373	FLN	Ahmed Boussebat
18 - Jijel	446,306	25.90%	115,609	85.09%	98,373	TAJ	Hilal Chetouane
18 - Jijel	446,306	25.90%	115,609	85.09%	98,373	RND	Abdelfettah Yahia
18 - Jijel	446,306	25.90%	115,609	85.09%	98,373	MSP	Salim Tebboub
18 - Jijel	446,306	25.90%	115,609	85.09%	98,373	Binaa	Abderrezak Touati
18 - Jijel	446,306	25.90%	115,609	85.09%	98,373	IND	Mohamed Amiour
19 - Sétif	1,037,444	14.71%	152,562	82.22%	125,435	FLN	Ahmed Badr El Islem Belguet
19 - Sétif	1,037,444	14.71%	152,562	82.22%	125,435	FLN	Radouane Bekrar
19 - Sétif	1,037,444	14.71%	152,562	82.22%	125,435	FLN	Djamel Sersoub
19 - Sétif	1,037,444	14.71%	152,562	82.22%	125,435	FLN	Mourad Boussahel
19 - Sétif	1,037,444	14.71%	152,562	82.22%	125,435	FLN	Samir Khaloua
19 - Sétif	1,037,444	14.71%	152,562	82.22%	125,435	FM	Djemai Boutchicha
19 - Sétif	1,037,444	14.71%	152,562	82.22%	125,435	FM	Abdelmonaime Issaadi
19 - Sétif	1,037,444	14.71%	152,562	82.22%	125,435	FM	Hicham Hadji
19 - Sétif	1,037,444	14.71%	152,562	82.22%	125,435	Binaa	Tarek Bechata
19 - Sétif	1,037,444	14.71%	152,562	82.22%	125,435	Binaa	Mohamed Laib
19 - Sétif	1,037,444	14.71%	152,562	82.22%	125,435	Binaa	Ali Haddad
19 - Sétif	1,037,444	14.71%	152,562	82.22%	125,435	PLJ	Nacereddine Yousfi
19 - Sétif	1,037,444	14.71%	152,562	82.22%	125,435	PLJ	Douadi Siadj
19 - Sétif	1,037,444	14.71%	152,562	82.22%	125,435	PFD	Abbes Chinoune
19 - Sétif	1,037,444	14.71%	152,562	82.22%	125,435	PFD	Lekchichi Bouguenna
19 - Sétif	1,037,444	14.71%	152,562	82.22%	125,435	PVP	Fayçal Lahreche
19 - Sétif	1,037,444	14.71%	152,562	82.22%	125,435	FFS	Boudjamline Ouaghlici
20 - Saïda	248,273	21.57%	53,548	79.75%	42,706	FM	Maamar Bessadet
20 - Saïda	248,273	21.57%	53,548	79.75%	42,706	FLN	Djelloul Hazzab
20 - Saïda	248,273	21.57%	53,548	79.75%	42,706	RND	Fatma Bida
20 - Saïda	248,273	21.57%	53,548	79.75%	42,706	Binaa	Mourad Belabed
21 - Skikda	627,828	22.38%	140,495	82.85%	116,407	FLN	Hamza Satouh
21 - Skikda	627,828	22.38%	140,495	82.85%	116,407	FLN	Wahid Boulguemh
21 - Skikda	627,828	22.38%	140,495	82.85%	116,407	RND	Seïf Eddine Bouraghda
21 - Skikda	627,828	22.38%	140,495	82.85%	116,407	RND	Ahmed Meftah
21 - Skikda	627,828	22.38%	140,495	82.85%	116,407	FM	Mounir Bouselsal
21 - Skikda	627,828	22.38%	140,495	82.85%	116,407	MSP	Ali Khoualed
21 - Skikda	627,828	22.38%	140,495	82.85%	116,407	PVP	Farès Bouteldja
21 - Skikda	627,828	22.38%	140,495	82.85%	116,407	Binaa	Karim Messaoudi
21 - Skikda	627,828	22.38%	140,495	82.85%	116,407	MRI	Oussama Boughazi
21 - Skikda	627,828	22.38%	140,495	82.85%	116,407	FJD	Boualem Djouama
22 - Sidi Bel Abbès	476,703	18.41%	87,741	75.20%	65,978	FLN	Yahia Mahi
22 - Sidi Bel Abbès	476,703	18.41%	87,741	75.20%	65,978	FLN	Mohamed Reda Mouilah
22 - Sidi Bel Abbès	476,703	18.41%	87,741	75.20%	65,978	RND	Mohamed Mir
22 - Sidi Bel Abbès	476,703	18.41%	87,741	75.20%	65,978	Binaa	Boualem Said
22 - Sidi Bel Abbès	476,703	18.41%	87,741	75.20%	65,978	IND	Ahmed Touat
22 - Sidi Bel Abbès	476,703	18.41%	87,741	75.20%	65,978	PVP	Ahmed Senoussaoui
23 - Annaba	438,879	16.21%	71,149	77.67%	55,260	FLN	Ouahida Saadi
23 - Annaba	438,879	16.21%	71,149	77.67%	55,260	FM	Ali Lahouel
23 - Annaba	438,879	16.21%	71,149	77.67%	55,260	MSP	Oualid Saklouli
23 - Annaba	438,879	16.21%	71,149	77.67%	55,260	RND	Mohamed Tahar Aggoune
23 - Annaba	438,879	16.21%	71,149	77.67%	55,260	PFD	Oualid Sayah
23 - Annaba	438,879	16.21%	71,149	77.67%	55,260	PT	Anis Arabi
24 - Guelma	365,032	22.12%	80,741	85.59%	69,105	RND	Abderrezak Krinah
24 - Guelma	365,032	22.12%	80,741	85.59%	69,105	FAN	Adel Dekhakhna
24 - Guelma	365,032	22.12%	80,741	85.59%	69,105	FLN	Nadir Noureddine
24 - Guelma	365,032	22.12%	80,741	85.59%	69,105	FM	Rebiai Tria
24 - Guelma	365,032	22.12%	80,741	85.59%	69,105	PVP	Djamel Hassaounia
25 - Constantine	606,853	14.85%	90,104	76.04%	68,518	FM	Mawloud Layeb
25 - Constantine	606,853	14.85%	90,104	76.04%	68,518	FM	Khaled Dekkiche
25 - Constantine	606,853	14.85%	90,104	76.04%	68,518	MSP	Djaber Benkassa
25 - Constantine	606,853	14.85%	90,104	76.04%	68,518	FLN	Lokmane Ababsa
25 - Constantine	606,853	14.85%	90,104	76.04%	68,518	Binaa	Habib Boutghan
25 - Constantine	606,853	14.85%	90,104	76.04%	68,518	RND	Houssem Eddine Redjem
25 - Constantine	606,853	14.85%	90,104	76.04%	68,518	IND	Mokhtar Boudra
25 - Constantine	606,853	14.85%	90,104	76.04%	68,518	PLJ	Aissa Rasennadja
25 - Constantine	606,853	14.85%	90,104	76.04%	68,518	FFS	Ramdane Meslem
26 - Médéa	393,392	21.87%	86,019	81.64%	70,228	MSP	Moussa Sassane
26 - Médéa	393,392	21.87%	86,019	81.64%	70,228	FLN	Billel Berraf
26 - Médéa	393,392	21.87%	86,019	81.64%	70,228	FM	Farida Abri
26 - Médéa	393,392	21.87%	86,019	81.64%	70,228	Binaa	Abdelhamid Makdouri
26 - Médéa	393,392	21.87%	86,019	81.64%	70,228	RND	Younes Laidi
26 - Médéa	393,392	21.87%	86,019	81.64%	70,228	PRA	Benyoucef Lami
27 - Mostaganem	499,011	24.19%	120,726	84.05%	101,473	MSP	Afif Boughliem
27 - Mostaganem	499,011	24.19%	120,726	84.05%	101,473	Binaa	Hadjira Abbas
27 - Mostaganem	499,011	24.19%	120,726	84.05%	101,473	RND	Ibn Abdallah Nadir Belghit
27 - Mostaganem	499,011	24.19%	120,726	84.05%	101,473	FLN	Naïma Boucif
27 - Mostaganem	499,011	24.19%	120,726	84.05%	101,473	PFD	Boubakr Bendjebbour
27 - Mostaganem	499,011	24.19%	120,726	84.05%	101,473	FM	Mohamed Azizi
27 - Mostaganem	499,011	24.19%	120,726	84.05%	101,473	IND	Abdelkader Mahiddini
27 - Mostaganem	499,011	24.19%	120,726	84.05%	101,473	PVP	Mourad Laidani
28 - M'Sila	405,186	23.39%	94,763	87.86%	83,255	RND	Soufiane Faid
28 - M'Sila	405,186	23.39%	94,763	87.86%	83,255	RND	Abdellah Laouidji
28 - M'Sila	405,186	23.39%	94,763	87.86%	83,255	FM	Ridda Mahdi
28 - M'Sila	405,186	23.39%	94,763	87.86%	83,255	FM	Feteh Layachi
28 - M'Sila	405,186	23.39%	94,763	87.86%	83,255	FLN	Abdelghani Benssaadi
28 - M'Sila	405,186	23.39%	94,763	87.86%	83,255	MSP	Ammar Djerioui
28 - M'Sila	405,186	23.39%	94,763	87.86%	83,255	Binaa	Rabah Seraiche
29 - Mascara	579,464	20.30%	117,648	79.82%	93,908	FLN	Boubakeur Merzouk
29 - Mascara	579,464	20.30%	117,648	79.82%	93,908	FLN	Habib Touta
29 - Mascara	579,464	20.30%	117,648	79.82%	93,908	RND	Ilies Benaissa
29 - Mascara	579,464	20.30%	117,648	79.82%	93,908	MSP	Benyssaad Merah
29 - Mascara	579,464	20.30%	117,648	79.82%	93,908	FM	Houcine Kerrar
29 - Mascara	579,464	20.30%	117,648	79.82%	93,908	Karama	Laredj Seba
29 - Mascara	579,464	20.30%	117,648	79.82%	93,908	Binaa	Mohamed El-Amine Bioud
29 - Mascara	579,464	20.30%	117,648	79.82%	93,908	Jil Jadid	Mohamed Amine Mars
30 - Ouargla	211,782	31.19%	66,053	77.58%	51,247	Karama	Boubakeur Mimouni
30 - Ouargla	211,782	31.19%	66,053	77.58%	51,247	FM	Djemal Lehella
30 - Ouargla	211,782	31.19%	66,053	77.58%	51,247	FLN	Abdelhamid Zengui
30 - Ouargla	211,782	31.19%	66,053	77.58%	51,247	MSP	Mohamed Lamine Guendouz
31 - Oran	1,057,963	13.49%	142,710	69.76%	99,552	MSP	Feth Alleh Azzouz
31 - Oran	1,057,963	13.49%	142,710	69.76%	99,552	MSP	Amine Allouche
31 - Oran	1,057,963	13.49%	142,710	69.76%	99,552	MSP	Samia Sadoune
31 - Oran	1,057,963	13.49%	142,710	69.76%	99,552	FLN	Abdelkrim Djellat
31 - Oran	1,057,963	13.49%	142,710	69.76%	99,552	FLN	Redouane Ousalah
31 - Oran	1,057,963	13.49%	142,710	69.76%	99,552	PVP	Mohammed Brahim Safi
31 - Oran	1,057,963	13.49%	142,710	69.76%	99,552	PVP	~~Abdelhak Bendjaafar~~ (Note: The deputy can't be considered elected until a decision has been made on ongoing criminal procedures. The seat remains vacant.)
31 - Oran	1,057,963	13.49%	142,710	69.76%	99,552	FM	Saïd Rizouga
31 - Oran	1,057,963	13.49%	142,710	69.76%	99,552	FM	Mohamed Zidan
31 - Oran	1,057,963	13.49%	142,710	69.76%	99,552	RND	Habib Belazze
31 - Oran	1,057,963	13.49%	142,710	69.76%	99,552	RND	Sofiane Hanitser
31 - Oran	1,057,963	13.49%	142,710	69.76%	99,552	Binaa	Madjid Lahmar
31 - Oran	1,057,963	13.49%	142,710	69.76%	99,552	Binaa	Moufdi Zakaria Taleb
31 - Oran	1,057,963	13.49%	142,710	69.76%	99,552	TAJ	Houari Abdelkader Yahia
31 - Oran	1,057,963	13.49%	142,710	69.76%	99,552	PT	Mohammed El Amine Bendenia
31 - Oran	1,057,963	13.49%	142,710	69.76%	99,552	MRI	Abdelhafidh Zahaf Kradra
32 - El Bayadh	158,464	32.29%	51,167	82.77%	42,351	RND	Bekkar Rabhallah
32 - El Bayadh	158,464	32.29%	51,167	82.77%	42,351	Binaa	Bouazza Bouazza
32 - El Bayadh	158,464	32.29%	51,167	82.77%	42,351	MSP	Amar Mecheri
33 - Illizi	69,589	55.35%	38,515	75.32%	29,008	RND	Abdenbi Sanati
33 - Illizi	69,589	55.35%	38,515	75.32%	29,008	FM	Hossine Ouled Hamma
34 - Bordj Bou Arréridj	468,390	24.24%	113,554	89.48%	101,604	FLN	Yakoub Benaissa
34 - Bordj Bou Arréridj	468,390	24.24%	113,554	89.48%	101,604	RND	Derradji Nada
34 - Bordj Bou Arréridj	468,390	24.24%	113,554	89.48%	101,604	FM	Adel Bouhali
34 - Bordj Bou Arréridj	468,390	24.24%	113,554	89.48%	101,604	IND	Abdelhalim Larafi
34 - Bordj Bou Arréridj	468,390	24.24%	113,554	89.48%	101,604	IND	Mohamed Nasri
34 - Bordj Bou Arréridj	468,390	24.24%	113,554	89.48%	101,604	Karama	Adel Ayata
34 - Bordj Bou Arréridj	468,390	24.24%	113,554	89.48%	101,604	Binaa	Rabeh Zebiri
35 - Boumerdès	523,665	14.59%	76,387	83.68%	63,921	RND	Abdennasser Attari
35 - Boumerdès	523,665	14.59%	76,387	83.68%	63,921	Binaa	Rabah Daimellah
35 - Boumerdès	523,665	14.59%	76,387	83.68%	63,921	FM	Yazid Ziane Khodja
35 - Boumerdès	523,665	14.59%	76,387	83.68%	63,921	FLN	Mohammed Tadjer
35 - Boumerdès	523,665	14.59%	76,387	83.68%	63,921	PFD	Farid Neggaz
35 - Boumerdès	523,665	14.59%	76,387	83.68%	63,921	PLJ	Allaaeddine Boudjelti
35 - Boumerdès	523,665	14.59%	76,387	83.68%	63,921	MSP	Imadeddine Aklil
35 - Boumerdès	523,665	14.59%	76,387	83.68%	63,921	FFS	Youghourta Mokrani
35 - Boumerdès	523,665	14.59%	76,387	83.68%	63,921	IND	Rachid Sabaoui
36 - El Tarf	336,576	27.50%	92,573	85.30%	78,969	FLN	Abdelkrim Chemam
36 - El Tarf	336,576	27.50%	92,573	85.30%	78,969	RND	Salah-Eddine Tahri
36 - El Tarf	336,576	27.50%	92,573	85.30%	78,969	IND	Ahcene Hani
36 - El Tarf	336,576	27.50%	92,573	85.30%	78,969	FM	Ridha Labbaci
37 - Tindouf	110,429	50.09%	55,314	69.81%	38,617	FLN	Ahmed Tahar
37 - Tindouf	110,429	50.09%	55,314	69.81%	38,617	RND	Azzedine Said
38 - Tissemsilt	179,345	24.56%	44,040	24.56%	34,537	FLN	Benchohra Kaddouri
38 - Tissemsilt	179,345	24.56%	44,040	24.56%	34,537	RND	Saad Ould Kaddour
38 - Tissemsilt	179,345	24.56%	44,040	24.56%	34,537	PVP	Mohamed Rabehi
39 - El Oued	273,812	30.85%	84,465	92.00%	77,708	FLN	Abdessemad Lemghedem
39 - El Oued	273,812	30.85%	84,465	92.00%	77,708	FLN	Djafar Saber Gherbi
39 - El Oued	273,812	30.85%	84,465	92.00%	77,708	FM	Ahmed Triki
39 - El Oued	273,812	30.85%	84,465	92.00%	77,708	FM	Ali Maiza
39 - El Oued	273,812	30.85%	84,465	92.00%	77,708	MSP	Brahim Behir
39 - El Oued	273,812	30.85%	84,465	92.00%	77,708	PVP	Hicham Dedjal
39 - El Oued	273,812	30.85%	84,465	92.00%	77,708	RND	Tayeb Ben Amor
40 - Khenchela	265,306	30.88%	81,939	91.65%	75,098	FM	Mahieddine Abrouk
40 - Khenchela	265,306	30.88%	81,939	91.65%	75,098	PVP	Imadeddine Belhouchet
40 - Khenchela	265,306	30.88%	81,939	91.65%	75,098	FLN	Abdeladdime Abdi
40 - Khenchela	265,306	30.88%	81,939	91.65%	75,098	Binaa	Hichem Khaldi
40 - Khenchela	265,306	30.88%	81,939	91.65%	75,098	IND	Abdelghani Allague
41 - Souk Ahras	331,353	19.16%	63,496	81.60%	51,810	FM	Samir Bougoffa
41 - Souk Ahras	331,353	19.16%	63,496	81.60%	51,810	FLN	Sabri Dairi
41 - Souk Ahras	331,353	19.16%	63,496	81.60%	51,810	Binaa	Hacéne Sayar
41 - Souk Ahras	331,353	19.16%	63,496	81.60%	51,810	RND	Talal Belhouchat
42 - Tipaza	457,668	20.14%	92,193	72.89%	67,203	FM	Abdelkader Amrouche
42 - Tipaza	457,668	20.14%	92,193	72.89%	67,203	FLN	Rachid Otsmane
42 - Tipaza	457,668	20.14%	92,193	72.89%	67,203	RND	Mohamed-Youcef Yamnaine
42 - Tipaza	457,668	20.14%	92,193	72.89%	67,203	PFD	Smail Fekir
42 - Tipaza	457,668	20.14%	92,193	72.89%	67,203	MSP	Mohamed El Amine Sadoukri
42 - Tipaza	457,668	20.14%	92,193	72.89%	67,203	Binaa	Ali Charani
42 - Tipaza	457,668	20.14%	92,193	72.89%	67,203	PLJ	Djilali Abdelkader Ben Hadj
43 - Mila	506,810	19.96%	101,154	83.32%	84,280	FLN	~~Ammar Barkat~~
43 - Mila	506,810	19.96%	101,154	83.32%	84,280	FLN	Badis Baghi
43 - Mila	506,810	19.96%	101,154	83.32%	84,280	RND	Monder Bouden
43 - Mila	506,810	19.96%	101,154	83.32%	84,280	RND	Ismail Boufenghour
43 - Mila	506,810	19.96%	101,154	83.32%	84,280	MSP	Zahia Benkara
43 - Mila	506,810	19.96%	101,154	83.32%	84,280	FM	Farid Sifoune
43 - Mila	506,810	19.96%	101,154	83.32%	84,280	Binaa	Issam Rezaiki
43 - Mila	506,810	19.96%	101,154	83.32%	84,280	Jil Jadid	Ammar Erredir
44 - Aïn Defla	493,024	22.27%	109,791	83.43%	91,599	FLN	Mohammed Dine
44 - Aïn Defla	493,024	22.27%	109,791	83.43%	91,599	FLN	Ali Djellouli
44 - Aïn Defla	493,024	22.27%	109,791	83.43%	91,599	IND	Hamid Bidaoui
44 - Aïn Defla	493,024	22.27%	109,791	83.43%	91,599	IND	Sami Ezzitouni Bokretaoui
44 - Aïn Defla	493,024	22.27%	109,791	83.43%	91,599	FM	Mahfoud Houas
44 - Aïn Defla	493,024	22.27%	109,791	83.43%	91,599	MSP	Mohammed Zeghou
44 - Aïn Defla	493,024	22.27%	109,791	83.43%	91,599	RND	Walid Rezala
44 - Aïn Defla	493,024	22.27%	109,791	83.43%	91,599	IND	Mohammed Daoudi
44 - Aïn Defla	493,024	22.27%	109,791	83.43%	91,599	Binaa	Islam Hamdi
45 - Naâma	181,483	27.03%	49,058	68.92%	33,811	FLN	Ahmed Boualem
45 - Naâma	181,483	27.03%	49,058	68.92%	33,811	MSP	Abdallah Harchaia
45 - Naâma	181,483	27.03%	49,058	68.92%	33,811	RND	Seddik Zerrouki
46 - Aïn Témouchent	321,943	18.99%	61,152	76.13%	46,554	FLN	Samira Douma
46 - Aïn Témouchent	321,943	18.99%	61,152	76.13%	46,554	RND	Abdelkader Medjahed
46 - Aïn Témouchent	321,943	18.99%	61,152	76.13%	46,554	FM	Rabah Damou
46 - Aïn Témouchent	321,943	18.99%	61,152	76.13%	46,554	FBG	Abderrahmane Benadda
47 - Ghardaïa	209,512	32.25%	67,574	89.00%	60,140	IND	Aoumeur Bafouloulou
47 - Ghardaïa	209,512	32.25%	67,574	89.00%	60,140	IND	Kacem Bahmani Rai
47 - Ghardaïa	209,512	32.25%	67,574	89.00%	60,140	IND	Omar Aissa
47 - Ghardaïa	209,512	32.25%	67,574	89.00%	60,140	FM	Messaoud Benseddik
48 - Relizane	441,354	23.19%	102,352	83.31%	85,271	MSP	Abdallah Amari
48 - Relizane	441,354	23.19%	102,352	83.31%	85,271	FM	Brahim Bettahar
48 - Relizane	441,354	23.19%	102,352	83.31%	85,271	RND	Houari Benaoula
48 - Relizane	441,354	23.19%	102,352	83.31%	85,271	Karama	Mustapha Sidennas
48 - Relizane	441,354	23.19%	102,352	83.31%	85,271	IND	Abdelmadjid Alem
48 - Relizane	441,354	23.19%	102,352	83.31%	85,271	TAJ	Miloud Bahri
48 - Relizane	441,354	23.19%	102,352	83.31%	85,271	Binaa	Hamid Bekheboucha
48 - Relizane	441,354	23.19%	102,352	83.31%	85,271	IND	Ali Said
49 - Timimoun	79,171	36.20%	28,660	84.92%	24,338	MSP	Miloud Ould Seddik
49 - Timimoun	79,171	36.20%	28,660	84.92%	24,338	FLN	Abdallah Moulay Lakhdar
50 - Bordj Badji Mokhtar	47,572	92.22%	43,870	96.14%	42,175	RND	Sidi Anarab
50 - Bordj Badji Mokhtar	47,572	92.22%	43,870	96.14%	42,175	FLN	Mohamed Tati
51 - Ouled Djellal	110,655	25.84%	28,590	90.37%	25,836	FLN	Djamal Houioua
51 - Ouled Djellal	110,655	25.84%	28,590	90.37%	25,836	RND	Bachir Rezgui
52 - Béni Abbès	40,724	41.30%	16,821	79.68%	13,403	FLN	Riyadh Touil
52 - Béni Abbès	40,724	41.30%	16,821	79.68%	13,403	MSP	Laid Boukerraf
53 - In Salah	44,627	50.45%	22,514	83.82%	18,871	FLN	Hamza Bouhafs
53 - In Salah	44,627	50.45%	22,514	83.82%	18,871	MSP	Ahmed Sagueni
54 - In Guezzam	39,342	84.75%	33,343	93.93%	31,318	FLN	Khaleni Drissi
54 - In Guezzam	39,342	84.75%	33,343	93.93%	31,318	RND	Abderahmane Zedda
55 - Touggourt	169,499	34.37%	58,254	86.72%	50,515	RND	Larbi Laifaoui
55 - Touggourt	169,499	34.37%	58,254	86.72%	50,515	FLN	Atallah Moulati
55 - Touggourt	169,499	34.37%	58,254	86.72%	50,515	Binaa	Saida Naiti
55 - Touggourt	169,499	34.37%	58,254	86.72%	50,515	MSP	Mouad Aissani
56 - Djanet	36,456	56.22%	20,495	77.18%	15,819	Binaa	Fatma El Hamal
56 - Djanet	36,456	56.22%	20,495	77.18%	15,819	FLN	Abdelouahab Zegri
57 - El M'Ghair	99,805	32.67%	32,606	88.59%	28,887	FLN	Imadeddine Beriala
57 - El M'Ghair	99,805	32.67%	32,606	88.59%	28,887	MSP	Mourad Khaoua
58 - El Menia	46,651	40.31%	18,806	85.62%	16,102	FM	Abdelhamid Bellakehal
58 - El Menia	46,651	40.31%	18,806	85.62%	16,102	IND	Yahia Mahammed
59 - Aflou	116,002	42.41%	49,202	88.38%	43,487	RND	Djallal Neggaz
59 - Aflou	116,002	42.41%	49,202	88.38%	43,487	FLN	Abdelaziz Boukhalfi
60 - Barika	107,830	33.27%	35,879	55.92%	20,064	FLN	Abdenour Belkorichi
60 - Barika	107,830	33.27%	35,879	55.92%	20,064	Binaa	Hamza Mohammedi
61 - El Kantara	33,167	42.61%	14,131	91.15%	12,881	RND	Okba Hafnaoui
61 - El Kantara	33,167	42.61%	14,131	91.15%	12,881	MSP	Chelali Merad
62 - Bir El Ater	70,280	35.36%	24,850	86.08%	21,391	FLN	Abdelkrim Malaoui
62 - Bir El Ater	70,280	35.36%	24,850	86.08%	21,391	RND	Rachid Rabah
63 - El Aricha	35,751	45.06%	16,108	73.80%	11,888	RND	Mohammed Benahmed
63 - El Aricha	35,751	45.06%	16,108	73.80%	11,888	FLN	Ali Belharrane
64 - Ksar Chellala	63,975	28.33%	18,127	86.21%	15,627	FLN	Isam Dahlab
64 - Ksar Chellala	63,975	28.33%	18,127	86.21%	15,627	RND	Brahim Hammadi
65 - Aïn Oussara	171,258	18.94%	32,440	69.24%	22,461	RND	Youcef Rebhi
65 - Aïn Oussara	171,258	18.94%	32,440	69.24%	22,461	FLN	Kamel Ben Sigaa
65 - Aïn Oussara	171,258	18.94%	32,440	69.24%	22,461	FM	Abdelkader Gherbi
66 - Messaad	97,503	21.10%	20,570	83.91%	17,261	FLN	Mohamed Belabbes
66 - Messaad	97,503	21.10%	20,570	83.91%	17,261	Binaa	Amar Zergot
67 - Ksar El Boukhari	165,863	22.77%	37,768	78.27%	29,562	MSP	Mohammed Elamine Mebrouki
67 - Ksar El Boukhari	165,863	22.77%	37,768	78.27%	29,562	FLN	Benhaoua Karmous
67 - Ksar El Boukhari	165,863	22.77%	37,768	78.27%	29,562	RND	Bachir Remada
68 - Bou Saâda	296,012	25.71%	76,118	88.12%	67,075	RND	Mohamed Helali
68 - Bou Saâda	296,012	25.71%	76,118	88.12%	67,075	MSP	Abdelmalek Djerida
68 - Bou Saâda	296,012	25.71%	76,118	88.12%	67,075	FM	Thameur Souidi
68 - Bou Saâda	296,012	25.71%	76,118	88.12%	67,075	FLN	Mounir Lahlali
69 - El Abiodh Sidi Cheikh	40,768	39.92%	16,274	85.40%	13,898	FLN	Mohammed El Amin Belamouri
69 - El Abiodh Sidi Cheikh	40,768	39.92%	16,274	85.40%	13,898	RND	Larbi Bahoussi
71 - First Diaspora Region	269,244	6.50%	17,511	88.87%	15,562	FLN	Djelloul Beddar
71 - First Diaspora Region	269,244	6.50%	17,511	88.87%	15,562	RND	Youcef Djaafar
72 - Second Diaspora Region	166,850	11.93%	19,913	87.46%	17,416	RND	Djamai Nedjah
72 - Second Diaspora Region	166,850	11.93%	19,913	87.46%	17,416	FM	Nouar Boukhors
73 - Third Diaspora Region	227,508	8.55%	19,449	90.95%	17,689	FLN	Mohamed Abidat
73 - Third Diaspora Region	227,508	8.55%	19,449	90.95%	17,689	IND	Foudil Djoudi
74 - Fourth Diaspora Region	32,658	30.77%	10,050	80.27%	8,067	FLN	Abdelmalek Cherifi
75 - Fifth Diaspora Region	26,601	8.54%	2,271	90.09%	2,046	FLN	Abdenebi Dadou
75 - Fifth Diaspora Region	26,601	8.54%	2,271	90.09%	2,046	IND	Mehdi Houhou
76 - Sixth Diaspora Region	21,048	24.79%	5,218	62.84%	3,279	Binaa	Mouna Ladjal
77 - Seventh Diaspora Region	66,175	14.12%	9,345	88.91%	8,309	FM	Fares Rahmani
78 - Eight Diaspora Region	44,201	18.22%	8,053	84.59%	6,812	FLN	Ismail Blila
