= Voice of the People (Algeria) =

Algerian political party

Voice of the People صوت الشعب
- President: Lamine Osmani
- Founded: April 27, 2019
- Split from: Algerian National Front
- Ideology: National conservatism; Populism
- Political position: Right-wing
- People's National Assembly: 16 / 407
- Council of the Nation: 2 / 174

The Voice of the People Party (Arabic: صوت الشعب, romanized: Ṣawt al-Shaʻb; French: Parti Voix du peuple, PVP) is an Algerian political party. It is led by Lamine Osmani, a former member of the Algerian National Front.

== Electoral results ==
=== Legislative elections ===
Year	Results		Seats	Rank
Year	Votes	%	Seats	Rank
2017	9,831	0.15	1 / 462	32nd ^{_}
2021	13,103	0.28	3 / 407	6th ^{_}
2026	221,726	5.29	16 / 407	6th ^{_}

=== Council of the Nation elections ===
Year	Results		Seats	Rank
Year	Voice	%	Seats	Rank
2022			2 / 174	6th ^{_}
2025			2 / 174	7th ^{_}

== See also ==
- List of political parties in Algeria
