= Free Citizens' Front =

Political party in Algeria

Free Citizens' Front: Front des citoyens libres; جبهة المواطنين الأحرار
- Leader: Najia Wajdi Damarji
- Political position: Centre
- People's National Assembly: 1 / 407

The Free Citizens' Front (Arabic: جبهة المواطنين الأحرار; French: Front des citoyens libres) is a political party in Algeria led by Najia Wajdi Damarji. The party is positioned at the centre of the political spectrum. The party won holds one seat in the People's National Assembly in the 2026 Algerian parliamentary election.

== Electoral history ==
=== People's National Assembly elections ===
Election	Leader	Votes	%	Seats	+/–	Position
2026	Najia Wajdi Damarji	13,229	0.32%	1 / 407	▲1	▲20th
