= 2017 Algerian parliamentary election =

- 4 May 2017
- All 462 seats in the People's National Assembly; 232 seats needed for a majority
- Turnout: 35.38% (▼7.76pp)
Party	Leader	Vote %	Seats	+/–
FLN	Djamel Ould Abbes	25.99	164	−44
RND	Ahmed Ouyahia	14.91	100	+32
MSP–FC	Abderrazak Makri	6.09	33	
TAJ	Amar Ghoul	4.18	19	New
FM	Abdelaziz Belaïd	4.11	14	+12
MPA		3.73	13	+6
Ennahda–FJD	Mohammed Dhouibi	3.70	15	
PT	Louisa Hanoune	2.97	11	−13
FFS	Mostefa Bouchachi	2.36	14	−13
ANR		1.87	6	+4
PLJ	Mohammed Saïd	1.37	2	
PFD		1.28	1	−4
El Karama	Mohamed Benhamou	1.26	3	+1
MRN	Djilali Ghouini	1.19	1	
El Fath		1.07	1	
RCD	Mohcine Belabbas	1.02	9	
FNHS	Khaled Bounedjema	0.99	1	−2
PJ	Hamana Boucharma	0.98	2	0
MEN		0.80	4	
FAN		0.76	1	
El Wihda		0.66	3	
Ahd 54	Ali Fawzi Rebaine	0.65	2	−1
RPR		0.63	2	0
El-Infitah		0.59	1	0
FMN		0.54	2	
UFDS	Noureddine Bahbouh	0.52	1	−2
FNL		0.49	1	
FDL		0.45	2	
PNSD		0.44	2	−2
PRA		0.38	1	0
MCL		0.22	1	0
PVP		0.15	1	
Minor lists	–	4.16	29	
This lists parties that won seats. See the complete results below.
Seats won by wilaya and constituency
Prime Minister before	Prime Minister after
Abdelmalek Sellal; FLN	Abdelmadjid Tebboune; FLN

Parliamentary elections were held in Algeria on 4 May 2017 to elect all 462 members of the People's National Assembly. The ruling National Liberation Front lost 44 seats, but remained the largest party in the People's National Assembly with 164 members.

== Electoral system ==
The 462 members of the People's National Assembly are elected by proportional representation from 48 multi-member constituencies based on the provinces. Seats are allocated using the largest remainder method.

== Campaign ==
Candidates began campaigning on 9 April 2017.

Parties boycotting the elections included Talaie El-Houriat and Jil Jadid, whilst the Union of Democratic and Social Forces was not authorised.

== Results ==
Party	Votes	%	Seats	+/–
National Liberation Front	1,681,321	25.99	164	–44
National Rally for Democracy	964,560	14.91	100	+32
MSP–FC	393,632	6.09	33	–
Rally for Hope for Algeria	270,112	4.18	19	New
Future Front	265,564	4.11	14	+12
Algerian Popular Movement	241,087	3.73	13	+6
Ennahda–FJD	239,148	3.70	15	–
Workers' Party	191,965	2.97	11	–13
Socialist Forces Front	152,489	2.36	14	–13
National Republican Alliance	121,156	1.87	6	+4
Freedom and Justice Party	88,418	1.37	2	–
New Dawn	82,993	1.28	1	–4
Dignity Party	81,180	1.26	3	+1
Movement for National Reform	77,290	1.19	1	–
El Fath	69,063	1.07	1	–
Rally for Culture and Democracy	65,841	1.02	9	–
National Front for Social Justice	63,827	0.99	1	–2
Party of Youth	63,682	0.98	2	0
Movement of National Understanding	51,960	0.80	4	–
New Algeria Front	49,413	0.76	1	–
Independante El Wihda	42,757	0.66	3	–
Ahd 54	42,160	0.65	2	–1
Republican Patriotic Rally	40,645	0.63	2	0
El-Infitah Movement	38,061	0.59	1	0
National Struggle Front	34,695	0.54	2	–
Union of Democratic and Social Forces	33,372	0.52	1	–2
National Front for Freedom	31,976	0.49	1	–
Free Democratic Front	28,790	0.45	2	–
National Party for Solidarity and Development	28,617	0.44	2	–2
Party of Algerian Renewal	24,584	0.38	1	0
National Assembly Union	17,577	0.27	1	–
El Taouasol	16,334	0.25	1	–
National Union for Development	15,037	0.23	1	–
El Hillal	14,582	0.23	1	–
National Movement of Algerian Workers	14,369	0.22	1	–
Movement of Free Citizens	14,085	0.22	1	0
Equity and Proclamation Party	13,400	0.21	1	–
Hope and Work	12,803	0.20	1	–
Nidaa El Awfiaa	12,224	0.19	1	–
El Wafa Wa Tawassol	12,170	0.19	1	–
El Wihda Oua Ettadaoul	10,771	0.17	1	–
El Wafa	10,561	0.16	1	–
Voice of the People	9,831	0.15	1	–
Abnaa Echaab	9,427	0.15	1	–
El Ouancharisse	9,046	0.14	2	–
En Nadjah	9,019	0.14	1	–
El Ichrak	8,901	0.14	1	–
El Moubadara	8,662	0.13	1	–
Elamel	8,388	0.13	1	–
Al Kafaa Wal Masdakia	7,856	0.12	1	–
Old Ksar	7,149	0.11	1	–
Sawt Echaab	6,652	0.10	1	–
Izewran Independent List	6,402	0.10	1	–
El Amel	6,361	0.10	1	–
Independent Citizen Alternative List	5,977	0.09	1	–
El Darrouri	5,675	0.09	1	–
Forsane Ouargla	5,414	0.08	1	–
El Badr	5,161	0.08	1	–
El Noor	4,549	0.07	1	–
Citizen Initiative	4,309	0.07	1	–
Other parties	615,130	9.51	0	–
Total	6,468,180	100.00	462	0
Valid votes	6,468,180	78.64		
Invalid/blank votes	1,757,043	21.36		
Total votes	8,225,223	100.00		
Registered voters/turnout	23,251,503	35.38		
Source: Constitutional Council
