= New Dawn (Algeria) =

Political party in Algeria

New Dawn الفجر الجديد
- President: Tahar Benbaibeche
- Founded: 2012; 14 years ago
- Ideology: Algerian nationalism; Populism; Reformism
- Political position: Centre-right
- People's National Assembly: 6 / 407
- Council of the Nation: 1 / 174

Website
- 710396.site123.me

New Dawn (Arabic: الفجر الجديد, romanized: al-Fajr al-Jadīd) is a nationalist and conservative political party in Algeria established in 2012.

== History and profile ==
The party was established in 2012. Its political ideology is nationalist and conservative, and its president is Tahar Benbaïbeche.

In the 2012 elections, the party received 1.74% of the votes and won five seats in the Parliament. It is among opposition parties in the Parliament.

The party supported the 2020 Algerian constitutional referendum.

== Electoral results ==
=== Legislative elections ===
Year	Results		Seats	Rank
Year	Voice	%	Seats	Rank
2012	132,492	1.42	5 / 462	12th
2017	82,993	1.28	1 / 462	
2021	7,433	0.16	2 / 407	10th
2026	80,871	1.93	6 / 407	9th

=== Council of the Nation elections ===
Year	Results		Seats	Rank
Year	Voice	%	Seats	Rank
2015			1 / 144	
2018			1 / 144	5th
2022			2 / 174	7th
2025			1 / 174	9th
