= Freedom and Justice Party (Algeria) =

Political party in Algeria

Freedom and Justice Party: Parti de la liberté et de la justice; حزب الحرية والعدالة
- Leader: Djamel Benziadi
- Ideology: Islamic democracy
- Political position: Right-wing
- People's National Assembly: 6 / 407

The Freedom and Justice Party (Arabic: حزب الحرية والعدالة; French: Parti de la liberté et de la justice, PLJ) is a political party in Algeria led by Djamel Benziadi. In the 2017 Algerian parliamentary election, the party won two seats in the People's National Assembly. In the 2021 Algerian parliamentary election, the party won two seats in the People's National Assembly. In the 2026 Algerian parliamentary election, it increased its representation to six seats.

== Electoral history ==
=== People's National Assembly elections ===
Election	Leader	Votes	%	Seats	+/–	Position
2017	Mohammed Saïd	88,418	1.37%	2 / 462	▲2	▲11th
2021	Djamel Benziadi	10,618	0.23%	2 / 407	0	▲7th
2026	Djamel Benziadi	69,699	1.66%	6 / 407	▲4	▼11th
