= National Unity and Development Party =

Political party in Algeria

National Unity and Development Party: Parti de l'unité nationale et du développement; حزب الوحدة الوطنية والتنمية
- Abbreviation: PUND
- Leader: Mohamed Dhif
- Political position: Centre
- People's National Assembly: 1 / 407

Website
- pund-dz.com (archived)

The National Unity and Development Party (Arabic: حزب الوحدة الوطنية والتنمية; French: Parti de l'unité nationale et du développement) is a political party in Algeria led by Mohamed Dhif. The party is positioned at the centre of the political spectrum. The party currently holds one seat in the People's National Assembly, which it won in the 2026 Algerian parliamentary election.

== Electoral history ==
=== People's National Assembly elections ===
Election	Leader	Votes	%	Seats	+/–	Position
2026	Mohamed Dhif	6,826	0.16%	1 / 407	▲1	▲22th
