= Dignity Party (Algeria) =

Political party in Algeria

Dignity Party: El Karama; حزب الكرامة
- Leader: Mohamed Eddaoui
- Ideology: Populism; Algerian nationalism
- Political position: Right-wing
- People's National Assembly: 5 / 407

Website
- daouadjiramzi.com

The Dignity Party (Arabic: حزب الكرامة; French: El Karama) is a political party in Algeria led by Mohamed Eddaoui. Its ideology is based on populism and Algerian nationalism. The party currently holds five seats in the People's National Assembly, which it won in the 2026 Algerian parliamentary election.

== Electoral history ==
=== People's National Assembly elections ===
Election	Leader	Votes	%	Seats	+/–	Position
2012		129,427	1.70%	2 / 462	▲2	▲13th
2017	Mohamed Benhamou	81,180	1.26%	3 / 462	▲1	13th
2021	Mohamed Eddaoui	5,942	0.13%	1 / 407	▼2	▲11th
2026	Mohamed Eddaoui	91,890	2.19%	5 / 407	▲4	▲8th
