= Good Governance Front =

Political party in Algeria

Good Governance Front: Front de la bonne gouvernance; جبهة الحكم الراشد
- Leader: Aissa Belhadi
- Ideology: Algerian nationalism Social conservatism Anti-immigration
- Political position: Right-wing
- People's National Assembly: 1 / 407

The Good Governance Front (Arabic: جبهة الحكم الراشد; French: Front de la bonne gouvernance) is a political party in Algeria led by Aissa Belhadi. The party advocates Algerian nationalism, social conservatism, and anti-immigration policies, and is positioned on the conservative side of the political spectrum. The party currently holds one seat in the People's National Assembly, which it won in the 2026 Algerian parliamentary election.

== Electoral history ==
=== People's National Assembly elections ===
Election	Leader	Votes	%	Seats	+/–	Position
2021	Aissa Belhadi	3,724	0.08%	2 / 407	▲2	▲12th
2026	Aissa Belhadi	17,876	0.43%	1 / 407	▼1	▼19th
