= New Algeria Front =

Political party in Algeria

New Algeria Front: Front de l’Algérie nouvelle; جبهة الجزائر الجديدة
- Leader: Djamel Benabdessalem
- Ideology: Algerian nationalism
- Political position: Centre
- People's National Assembly: 1 / 407

The New Algeria Front (Arabic: جبهة الجزائر الجديدة; French: Front de l’Algérie nouvelle) is a political party in Algeria led by Djamel Benabdessalem. The party advocates Algerian nationalism and is positioned at the centre of the political spectrum. The party currently holds five seats in the People's National Assembly, which it won in the 2026 Algerian parliamentary election.

== Electoral history ==
=== People's National Assembly elections ===
Election	Leader	Votes	%	Seats	+/–	Position
2017		49,413	0.76%	1 / 462	▲1	▲20th
2021	Djamel Benabdessalem	7,916	0.17%	1 / 407	0	▲8th
2026	Djamel Benabdessalem	32,092	0.77%	1 / 407	0	▼16th
