= 2021 Algerian parliamentary election =

- 12 June 2021
- All 407 seats in the People's National Assembly; 204 seats needed for a majority
- Turnout: 22.99% (▼12.39pp)
Party	Leader	Vote %	Seats	+/–
FLN	Abou El-Fadhel Baadji	6.24	98	−66
MSP	Abderrazak Makri	4.52	65	+32
RND	Tayeb Zitouni	4.31	58	−42
FM	Abdelaziz Belaïd	3.34	48	+34
El Binaa	Abdelkader Bengrina	2.30	39	New
PVP	Lamine Osmani	0.28	3	+2
PLJ	Djamel Benziadi	0.23	2	0
FAN	Djamel Benabdessalem	0.17	1	0
FJD	Abdallah Djaballah	0.17	2	−3
PFD	Tahat Benbaibeche	0.16	2	New
El Karama	Mohamed Eddaoui	0.13	1	−2
FBG	Aissa Belhadi	0.08	2	New
Jil Jadid	Soufiane Djilali	0.08	1	New
FNA	Moussa Touati	0.03	1	+1
Minor lists	–	5.57	84	+56
This lists parties that won seats. See the complete results below.
Seats won by wilaya and constituency
Prime Minister before	Prime Minister after
Abdelaziz Djerad; Independent	Aymen Benabderrahmane; Independent

Snap parliamentary elections were held in Algeria on 12 June 2021 to elect all 407 members of the People's National Assembly. Initially expected to be held in 2022, the elections were brought forward following a constitutional amendment approved in a referendum in November 2020.

== Background ==
=== 2017 legislative election ===
The 2017 parliamentary elections were characterized by a low turnout of 35%, lower than the 43% turnout in the 2012 parliamentary elections. The ruling coalition, an alliance between the National Liberation Front (FLN) and the National Rally for Democracy (RND), retained the absolute majority of seats in the National People's Assembly, despite a sharp decline in seats won by FLN.

Society in Algeria has been tense for several years due to the fall in oil prices, as income from hydrocarbons represented 60% of the state budget. A large part of the population encountered economic difficulties because the prices of basic necessities were heavily subsidized by the state.

=== 2019–20 Algerian protests ===
President Abdelmadjid Tebboune, controversially elected in December 2019 following the protests known as "Hirak" ('The Movement'), initiated a constitutional reform at the start of his term which led to the holding of a referendum on November 1, 2020. President Tebboune declared that an early dissolution of the two chambers of parliament would take place in late 2020 if the new constitution was approved by voters. While the referendum was approved, the call for new election was delayed by Tebboune staying in Germany for over two months to get treatment for COVID-19.

== Electoral system ==
Algeria has a bicameral parliament of which the People's National Assembly is the lower house. This is made up of 407 seats filled by proportional representation in 59 constituencies corresponding to the 58 Provinces (prefectures) of the country plus one constituency representing the diaspora. Each constituency is allocated a number of seats according to its population: one seat per segment of 120,000 inhabitants, plus one seat for any remaining segment of 60,000 inhabitants, with a minimum of three seats per constituency. The lists are open, with preferential voting, without mixing, and an electoral threshold of 5% of the votes cast, after counting of the votes, the distribution of seats is done according to the method known as "the strongest remainder".

These are the first elections since the modification of the electoral law a few months earlier, which introduced open lists and the electoral threshold. Exceptionally for this ballot, the new law lifts the conditions restricting the participation of parties to only those having obtained at least 4% of the votes cast in the previous elections, or gathered the sponsorship signatures of 250 citizens in each of the constituencies. in which one of their candidates presents himself. The total number of seats is also reduced for this election, dropping from 462 to 407 seats following a presidential decree modifying the distribution key according to the population. The previous elections were in fact organized with one seat per 80,000 inhabitants, plus one seat for any remaining 40,000 inhabitants, for a minimum of four seats per constituency.

A total of 24,490,180 voters are registered to vote, including 23,587,815 in Algeria and 902,365 abroad. The total amount was later reduced to 24,453,992 voters after appeals to the Constitutional Court.

== Results ==
The election saw the lowest turnout of those held for the legislature in Algerian history (only the 2020 Algerian constitutional referendum saw a lower turnout overall), with under 23% of the eligible population participating. The governing National Liberation Front won a plurality of seats, although both it and coalition partner Democratic National Rally saw heavy losses. The nationalist Future Front, the Islamist Movement of Society for Peace, the new National Construction Movement and independents all saw large gains at their expense, while other entities saw minor changes. A total of 136 seats were won by candidates under the age of 40, 35 were won by women, and 274 were won by those with a tertiary education.

Following the elections, a coalition was formed by the National Liberation Front, Democratic National Rally, Future Front, and National Construction Movement, as well as several members from independent lists.

Party	Votes	%	Seats	+/–
National Liberation Front	287,828	6.24	98	−66
Movement of Society for Peace	208,471	4.52	65	+32
Democratic National Rally	198,758	4.31	58	−42
Future Front	153,987	3.34	48	+34
National Construction Movement	106,203	2.30	39	New
Voice of the People	13,103	0.28	3	+2
Freedom and Justice Party	10,618	0.23	2	0
New Algeria Front	7,916	0.17	1	0
Justice and Development Front	7,667	0.17	2	–
New Dawn	7,433	0.16	2	New
Dignity Party	5,942	0.13	1	−2
Good Governance Front	3,724	0.08	2	New
Jil Jadid	3,576	0.08	1	New
Algerian National Front	1,207	0.03	1	+1
Minor independent lists that won seats	256,732	5.57	84	+56
Other parties and independent lists	3,337,487	72.39	0	–
Total	4,610,652	100.00	407	−55
Valid votes	4,610,652	82.01		
Invalid/blank votes	1,011,749	17.99		
Total votes	5,622,401	100.00		
Registered voters/turnout	24,453,992	22.99		
Source: Official Algerian Journal

=== By constituency ===
Constituency	Electorate	Turnout		Valid votes		Deputies	
1 - Adrar	164,988	41.66%	68,737	82.42%	56,650	MSP	Afif Bleila
1 - Adrar	164,988	41.66%	68,737	82.42%	56,650	FLN	Abdellah Elalaoui
1 - Adrar	164,988	41.66%	68,737	82.42%	56,650	Binaa	Ahmed Belalem
2 - Chlef	723,507	18.74%	135,552	81.98%	111,119	RND	Ibrahim Hadj Henni
2 - Chlef	723,507	18.74%	135,552	81.98%	111,119	RND	Khelifa Benabed
2 - Chlef	723,507	18.74%	135,552	81.98%	111,119	RND	M'Hammed Touil
2 - Chlef	723,507	18.74%	135,552	81.98%	111,119	RND	Zoheir Khelladi
2 - Chlef	723,507	18.74%	135,552	81.98%	111,119	FLN	Hichem Sofiane Salaouatchi
2 - Chlef	723,507	18.74%	135,552	81.98%	111,119	FLN	Naceur Boudjeltia
2 - Chlef	723,507	18.74%	135,552	81.98%	111,119	FLN	Smaine Bellkella
2 - Chlef	723,507	18.74%	135,552	81.98%	111,119	MSP	Ahmed Sadok
2 - Chlef	723,507	18.74%	135,552	81.98%	111,119	MSP	Maamar Omar
2 - Chlef	723,507	18.74%	135,552	81.98%	111,119	IND	Djilali Bekhaoua
2 - Chlef	723,507	18.74%	135,552	81.98%	111,119	IND	Madjid Cherid
3 - Laghouat	297,035	35.72%	106,090	82.87%	87,914	MSP	Zakaria Belkheir
3 - Laghouat	297,035	35.72%	106,090	82.87%	87,914	RND	Aissa Bencherchafa
3 - Laghouat	297,035	35.72%	106,090	82.87%	87,914	FM	Khelifa Benslimane
3 - Laghouat	297,035	35.72%	106,090	82.87%	87,914	FLN	Belgacem Benelmouaz
3 - Laghouat	297,035	35.72%	106,090	82.87%	87,914	Binaa	Messaoud Bessas
3 - Laghouat	297,035	35.72%	106,090	82.87%	87,914	IND	Tayeb Ramdani
4 - Oum El Bouaghi	431,154	25.35%	109,277	87.24%	95,338	MSP	Mohamed Said Maanser
4 - Oum El Bouaghi	431,154	25.35%	109,277	87.24%	95,338	MSP	Abdelyamine Annab
4 - Oum El Bouaghi	431,154	25.35%	109,277	87.24%	95,338	RND	Halim Bencharif
4 - Oum El Bouaghi	431,154	25.35%	109,277	87.24%	95,338	RND	Omar Terbak
4 - Oum El Bouaghi	431,154	25.35%	109,277	87.24%	95,338	FLN	Lekhemissi Chaibrassou
4 - Oum El Bouaghi	431,154	25.35%	109,277	87.24%	95,338	FLN	Souhila Agoudjil
4 - Oum El Bouaghi	431,154	25.35%	109,277	87.24%	95,338	FM	Soufiene Nouri
5 - Batna	674,836	27.98%	188,788	90.54%	170,928	RND	Ammar Oulmi
5 - Batna	674,836	27.98%	188,788	90.54%	170,928	RND	Rachid Belouerghi
5 - Batna	674,836	27.98%	188,788	90.54%	170,928	RND	Atmane Meddour
5 - Batna	674,836	27.98%	188,788	90.54%	170,928	FM	Abdelhalim Zakour
5 - Batna	674,836	27.98%	188,788	90.54%	170,928	FM	Fatima Rebiai
5 - Batna	674,836	27.98%	188,788	90.54%	170,928	FM	Slimane Smaili
5 - Batna	674,836	27.98%	188,788	90.54%	170,928	Binaa	Abdelbasset Gharbi
5 - Batna	674,836	27.98%	188,788	90.54%	170,928	Binaa	Said Nefissi
5 - Batna	674,836	27.98%	188,788	90.54%	170,928	IND	Bachir Ferhani
5 - Batna	674,836	27.98%	188,788	90.54%	170,928	IND	Souheila Chekchak
5 - Batna	674,836	27.98%	188,788	90.54%	170,928	IND	Sakeur Berri
5 - Batna	674,836	27.98%	188,788	90.54%	170,928	IND	Yazid Bouhenaf
6 - Béjaïa	542,256	0.42%	2,267	64.71%	1,467	FLN	Mokrane Hadji
6 - Béjaïa	542,256	0.42%	2,267	64.71%	1,467	FLN	Samia Moualfi
6 - Béjaïa	542,256	0.42%	2,267	64.71%	1,467	FLN	Riad Hanachi
6 - Béjaïa	542,256	0.42%	2,267	64.71%	1,467	FLN	Anis Saoudi
6 - Béjaïa	542,256	0.42%	2,267	64.71%	1,467	IND	Seghir Saci
6 - Béjaïa	542,256	0.42%	2,267	64.71%	1,467	IND	Mohamed Hani
6 - Béjaïa	542,256	0.42%	2,267	64.71%	1,467	IND	Mouloud Dehouche
6 - Béjaïa	542,256	0.42%	2,267	64.71%	1,467	RND	Smail Mira
6 - Béjaïa	542,256	0.42%	2,267	64.71%	1,467	IND	Massinissa Ouari
7 - Biskra	403,741	27.97%	112,934	83.54%	94,343	RND	Mohamed Aziez
7 - Biskra	403,741	27.97%	112,934	83.54%	94,343	RND	Omar Messaoudi
7 - Biskra	403,741	27.97%	112,934	83.54%	94,343	MSP	Said Ariech
7 - Biskra	403,741	27.97%	112,934	83.54%	94,343	FM	Zine El Abidine Didiche
7 - Biskra	403,741	27.97%	112,934	83.54%	94,343	FLN	Ouassila Tayeb
7 - Biskra	403,741	27.97%	112,934	83.54%	94,343	Karama	Hadj Laarouci Krid
8 - Béchar	167,596	35.04%	58,733	66.58%	39,103	MSP	Youcef Berrechid
8 - Béchar	167,596	35.04%	58,733	66.58%	39,103	MSP	Nacer Eddine Salhi
8 - Béchar	167,596	35.04%	58,733	66.58%	39,103	IND	Abdelaziz Kacemi
9 - Blida	705,178	20.63%	145,509	72.08%	104,882	FLN	Kamel Zouahra
9 - Blida	705,178	20.63%	145,509	72.08%	104,882	FLN	Yaakoub Elfertas
9 - Blida	705,178	20.63%	145,509	72.08%	104,882	FLN	Hamza Ezzraimi
9 - Blida	705,178	20.63%	145,509	72.08%	104,882	FLN	Hamza Hamlaoui
9 - Blida	705,178	20.63%	145,509	72.08%	104,882	Binaa	Abdelkader Djichergui
9 - Blida	705,178	20.63%	145,509	72.08%	104,882	Binaa	Zouhir Fares
9 - Blida	705,178	20.63%	145,509	72.08%	104,882	Binaa	Mustapha Temmar
9 - Blida	705,178	20.63%	145,509	72.08%	104,882	IND	Ali Mounsi
9 - Blida	705,178	20.63%	145,509	72.08%	104,882	IND	Ayoub Hammad
9 - Blida	705,178	20.63%	145,509	72.08%	104,882	IND	Soumia Belkacem
9 - Blida	705,178	20.63%	145,509	72.08%	104,882	IND	Farouk Ahmed Hedjala
9 - Blida	705,178	20.63%	145,509	72.08%	104,882	IND	Ayoub Tahraoui
10 - Bouira	534,272	11.42%	61,006	84.32%	51,439	FM	Hocine Abbache
10 - Bouira	534,272	11.42%	61,006	84.32%	51,439	FM	Fateh Temmar
10 - Bouira	534,272	11.42%	61,006	84.32%	51,439	FM	Toufik Guerrache
10 - Bouira	534,272	11.42%	61,006	84.32%	51,439	FLN	Brahim Sadli
10 - Bouira	534,272	11.42%	61,006	84.32%	51,439	FLN	Ahmed Hachimi
10 - Bouira	534,272	11.42%	61,006	84.32%	51,439	RND	Ahmed Nacer Bey
10 - Bouira	534,272	11.42%	61,006	84.32%	51,439	Binaa	Salah Sadelli
11 - Tamanrasset	106,863	51.29%	54,808	82.32%	45,118	RND	Boudjemaa Zenani
11 - Tamanrasset	106,863	51.29%	54,808	82.32%	45,118	FM	Mouloud Habnassi
11 - Tamanrasset	106,863	51.29%	54,808	82.32%	45,118	FLN	Ahmed Gmama
12 - Tébessa	467,274	28.02%	130,920	86.04%	112,645	MSP	Messaoud Zerfaoui
12 - Tébessa	467,274	28.02%	130,920	86.04%	112,645	MSP	Abdallah Mecheri
12 - Tébessa	467,274	28.02%	130,920	86.04%	112,645	FLN	Seddik Bakhouche
12 - Tébessa	467,274	28.02%	130,920	86.04%	112,645	FLN	Saad Abbane
12 - Tébessa	467,274	28.02%	130,920	86.04%	112,645	RND	Zine Djaafar
12 - Tébessa	467,274	28.02%	130,920	86.04%	112,645	FM	Belgacem Mesnadi
12 - Tébessa	467,274	28.02%	130,920	86.04%	112,645	PLJ	Louardi Bradji
13 - Tlemcen	722,200	24.96%	180,279	82.09%	147,984	RND	Boumediène Hanba
13 - Tlemcen	722,200	24.96%	180,279	82.09%	147,984	RND	Fethi Belhadj
13 - Tlemcen	722,200	24.96%	180,279	82.09%	147,984	RND	Fawzi Benamar
13 - Tlemcen	722,200	24.96%	180,279	82.09%	147,984	RND	Rachid Dekhli
13 - Tlemcen	722,200	24.96%	180,279	82.09%	147,984	RND	Omar Khelidj
13 - Tlemcen	722,200	24.96%	180,279	82.09%	147,984	FLN	Hafif Rebiai
13 - Tlemcen	722,200	24.96%	180,279	82.09%	147,984	FLN	Abdel Mouméne Bechlaghem
13 - Tlemcen	722,200	24.96%	180,279	82.09%	147,984	FLN	Samira Amir
13 - Tlemcen	722,200	24.96%	180,279	82.09%	147,984	IND	Rabah Belmokhtar
13 - Tlemcen	722,200	24.96%	180,279	82.09%	147,984	IND	Mohammed Khouane
14 - Tiaret	561,697	26.49%	148,766	82.15%	122,206	IND	Rabah Bouteldja
14 - Tiaret	561,697	26.49%	148,766	82.15%	122,206	IND	Ahmed Lamine Saibi
14 - Tiaret	561,697	26.49%	148,766	82.15%	122,206	IND	Lakhdar Dibachehba
14 - Tiaret	561,697	26.49%	148,766	82.15%	122,206	MSP	Souleyman Zerkani
14 - Tiaret	561,697	26.49%	148,766	82.15%	122,206	MSP	Ahmed Beldjilali
14 - Tiaret	561,697	26.49%	148,766	82.15%	122,206	RND	Abdelkader Toumi
14 - Tiaret	561,697	26.49%	148,766	82.15%	122,206	RND	Abdelkader Zeggai
14 - Tiaret	561,697	26.49%	148,766	82.15%	122,206	FLN	Ahmed Adel Chakour
14 - Tiaret	561,697	26.49%	148,766	82.15%	122,206	FLN	Sid Ahmed Temamri
15 - Tizi Ouzou	605,509	0.90%	5,420	92.60%	5,019	RND	Abdenour Belarbi
15 - Tizi Ouzou	605,509	0.90%	5,420	92.60%	5,019	RND	Kamel Kasdi
15 - Tizi Ouzou	605,509	0.90%	5,420	92.60%	5,019	FLN	Mohamed Garichi
15 - Tizi Ouzou	605,509	0.90%	5,420	92.60%	5,019	FLN	Meziane Djouzi
15 - Tizi Ouzou	605,509	0.90%	5,420	92.60%	5,019	IND	Boualem Diaf
15 - Tizi Ouzou	605,509	0.90%	5,420	92.60%	5,019	IND	Lila Messaoudi
15 - Tizi Ouzou	605,509	0.90%	5,420	92.60%	5,019	IND	Yacine Abib
15 - Tizi Ouzou	605,509	0.90%	5,420	92.60%	5,019	IND	Abdelwahab Ait Menguellet
15 - Tizi Ouzou	605,509	0.90%	5,420	92.60%	5,019	FM	Ramdane Khendriche
15 - Tizi Ouzou	605,509	0.90%	5,420	92.60%	5,019	PVP	Brahim Afettouche
15 - Tizi Ouzou	605,509	0.90%	5,420	92.60%	5,019	IND	Saadi Mohellebi
16 - Algiers	1,972,914	12.85%	253,475	75.10%	190,357	FLN	Mohamed Djouahra
16 - Algiers	1,972,914	12.85%	253,475	75.10%	190,357	FLN	Behdja Lammali
16 - Algiers	1,972,914	12.85%	253,475	75.10%	190,357	FLN	Zouhaier Nasri
16 - Algiers	1,972,914	12.85%	253,475	75.10%	190,357	FLN	Mohammed Bouabdallah
16 - Algiers	1,972,914	12.85%	253,475	75.10%	190,357	FLN	Riad Khellaf
16 - Algiers	1,972,914	12.85%	253,475	75.10%	190,357	FLN	Ali Rebidj
16 - Algiers	1,972,914	12.85%	253,475	75.10%	190,357	FLN	Messaoud Guesri
16 - Algiers	1,972,914	12.85%	253,475	75.10%	190,357	FLN	Farida Djebali
16 - Algiers	1,972,914	12.85%	253,475	75.10%	190,357	FLN	Miloud Tessouh
16 - Algiers	1,972,914	12.85%	253,475	75.10%	190,357	FLN	Farida Ilimi
16 - Algiers	1,972,914	12.85%	253,475	75.10%	190,357	MSP	Rabah Belkhiri
16 - Algiers	1,972,914	12.85%	253,475	75.10%	190,357	MSP	Hamid Ait Amer
16 - Algiers	1,972,914	12.85%	253,475	75.10%	190,357	MSP	Amar Dherra
16 - Algiers	1,972,914	12.85%	253,475	75.10%	190,357	MSP	Azzedine Zehouf
16 - Algiers	1,972,914	12.85%	253,475	75.10%	190,357	MSP	Mohamed Khelassi
16 - Algiers	1,972,914	12.85%	253,475	75.10%	190,357	MSP	Ahmed Khenniche
16 - Algiers	1,972,914	12.85%	253,475	75.10%	190,357	MSP	Khedidja Belkadi
16 - Algiers	1,972,914	12.85%	253,475	75.10%	190,357	MSP	Zakia Bougatoucha
16 - Algiers	1,972,914	12.85%	253,475	75.10%	190,357	FM	Leila Lyazidi
16 - Algiers	1,972,914	12.85%	253,475	75.10%	190,357	FM	Lies Gamgani
16 - Algiers	1,972,914	12.85%	253,475	75.10%	190,357	FM	Fateh Boutbig
16 - Algiers	1,972,914	12.85%	253,475	75.10%	190,357	FM	Sofiane Seddiki
16 - Algiers	1,972,914	12.85%	253,475	75.10%	190,357	FM	Mohamed Rédha Benallegue
16 - Algiers	1,972,914	12.85%	253,475	75.10%	190,357	FM	Abdennour Hammar
16 - Algiers	1,972,914	12.85%	253,475	75.10%	190,357	FM	Samira Barhoum
16 - Algiers	1,972,914	12.85%	253,475	75.10%	190,357	FM	Aicha Benturki
16 - Algiers	1,972,914	12.85%	253,475	75.10%	190,357	Binaa	Elbara Ben Grina
16 - Algiers	1,972,914	12.85%	253,475	75.10%	190,357	Binaa	Allal Bouteldja
16 - Algiers	1,972,914	12.85%	253,475	75.10%	190,357	Binaa	Tamim Badaoui
16 - Algiers	1,972,914	12.85%	253,475	75.10%	190,357	Binaa	Abdelkader Berriche
16 - Algiers	1,972,914	12.85%	253,475	75.10%	190,357	Binaa	Adel Nessakh
16 - Algiers	1,972,914	12.85%	253,475	75.10%	190,357	Binaa	Mahdi Meftahi
16 - Algiers	1,972,914	12.85%	253,475	75.10%	190,357	Binaa	Kamel Benkhelouf
16 - Algiers	1,972,914	12.85%	253,475	75.10%	190,357	Binaa	Khaoula Talbi
17 - Djelfa	602,666	28.81%	173,626	84.57%	146,834	FLN	Ahmed Bessine
17 - Djelfa	602,666	28.81%	173,626	84.57%	146,834	FLN	Ahmed Rebhi
17 - Djelfa	602,666	28.81%	173,626	84.57%	146,834	FLN	Maria Amraoui
17 - Djelfa	602,666	28.81%	173,626	84.57%	146,834	FLN	Ben Lakehal Feitas
17 - Djelfa	602,666	28.81%	173,626	84.57%	146,834	FLN	Belkheir Guerzou
17 - Djelfa	602,666	28.81%	173,626	84.57%	146,834	FLN	Salem Benyattou
17 - Djelfa	602,666	28.81%	173,626	84.57%	146,834	FLN	Mohamed Aliouat
17 - Djelfa	602,666	28.81%	173,626	84.57%	146,834	FLN	Hocine Habchi
17 - Djelfa	602,666	28.81%	173,626	84.57%	146,834	FLN	Messaoud Kerma
17 - Djelfa	602,666	28.81%	173,626	84.57%	146,834	FLN	Nabil Bouzidi
17 - Djelfa	602,666	28.81%	173,626	84.57%	146,834	FLN	Mohamed Doukani
17 - Djelfa	602,666	28.81%	173,626	84.57%	146,834	FLN	Messaouda Bedeirina
17 - Djelfa	602,666	28.81%	173,626	84.57%	146,834	FLN	Riadhi Mohamed Benderrah
18 - Jijel	443,858	27.37%	121,497	81.81%	99,393	MSP	Salim Tebboub
18 - Jijel	443,858	27.37%	121,497	81.81%	99,393	FM	Abdenour Bousbia
18 - Jijel	443,858	27.37%	121,497	81.81%	99,393	Binaa	Abderrezak Touati
18 - Jijel	443,858	27.37%	121,497	81.81%	99,393	IND	Mahmoud Kerroud
18 - Jijel	443,858	27.37%	121,497	81.81%	99,393	IND	Mohammed-Yazid Benhamouda
18 - Jijel	443,858	27.37%	121,497	81.81%	99,393	IND	Mohammed Brighen
19 - Sétif	1,019,287	20.87%	212,709	83.67%	177,980	FLN	Saïd Hamsi
19 - Sétif	1,019,287	20.87%	212,709	83.67%	177,980	FLN	Naceur Batiche
19 - Sétif	1,019,287	20.87%	212,709	83.67%	177,980	FLN	Rachid Belguet
19 - Sétif	1,019,287	20.87%	212,709	83.67%	177,980	FLN	Amina Korichi
19 - Sétif	1,019,287	20.87%	212,709	83.67%	177,980	FLN	Khaled Bourenane
19 - Sétif	1,019,287	20.87%	212,709	83.67%	177,980	FLN	Toufik Guezzout
19 - Sétif	1,019,287	20.87%	212,709	83.67%	177,980	MSP	Farida Ghemra
19 - Sétif	1,019,287	20.87%	212,709	83.67%	177,980	MSP	Ahmed Lakhdar Djouada
19 - Sétif	1,019,287	20.87%	212,709	83.67%	177,980	MSP	Salah Djaghloul
19 - Sétif	1,019,287	20.87%	212,709	83.67%	177,980	MSP	Houdaifa Zaghouane
19 - Sétif	1,019,287	20.87%	212,709	83.67%	177,980	MSP	Boubekeur Boutiche
19 - Sétif	1,019,287	20.87%	212,709	83.67%	177,980	RND	Smail Filali
19 - Sétif	1,019,287	20.87%	212,709	83.67%	177,980	RND	Abdelghani Toumi
19 - Sétif	1,019,287	20.87%	212,709	83.67%	177,980	RND	Sihamdi Hamdaoui
19 - Sétif	1,019,287	20.87%	212,709	83.67%	177,980	RND	Bouzid Moumeni
20 - Saïda	246,376	29.47%	72,617	80.62%	58,545	FLN	Abdelkader Merabet
20 - Saïda	246,376	29.47%	72,617	80.62%	58,545	FLN	Ahmed Benaissa
20 - Saïda	246,376	29.47%	72,617	80.62%	58,545	IND	Abdelkrim Bouanani
20 - Saïda	246,376	29.47%	72,617	80.62%	58,545	IND	Fatma Bida
21 - Skikda	760,783	25.15%	191,323	84.09%	160,890	FM	Nabil Guend
21 - Skikda	760,783	25.15%	191,323	84.09%	160,890	FM	Abderrazak Boussehaba
21 - Skikda	760,783	25.15%	191,323	84.09%	160,890	FM	Nasser Bouakkaz
21 - Skikda	760,783	25.15%	191,323	84.09%	160,890	FM	Rafik Nafir
21 - Skikda	760,783	25.15%	191,323	84.09%	160,890	MSP	Rachid Mehtour
21 - Skikda	760,783	25.15%	191,323	84.09%	160,890	MSP	Mohamed Nini
21 - Skikda	760,783	25.15%	191,323	84.09%	160,890	MSP	Abdesalem Bachagha
21 - Skikda	760,783	25.15%	191,323	84.09%	160,890	FLN	Hocine Nekakaa
21 - Skikda	760,783	25.15%	191,323	84.09%	160,890	FLN	Abdelmadjid Mecheri
21 - Skikda	760,783	25.15%	191,323	84.09%	160,890	FLN	Riad Sahnoune
22 - Sidi Bel Abbès	469,664	26.26%	123,314	79.47%	98,001	FLN	Mohamed Reda Mouilah
22 - Sidi Bel Abbès	469,664	26.26%	123,314	79.47%	98,001	FLN	Bentabet Azzi
22 - Sidi Bel Abbès	469,664	26.26%	123,314	79.47%	98,001	FLN	Miloud Khelifa
22 - Sidi Bel Abbès	469,664	26.26%	123,314	79.47%	98,001	IND	Mohammed Amine Kourat
22 - Sidi Bel Abbès	469,664	26.26%	123,314	79.47%	98,001	IND	Mohamed Kada Benchiha
22 - Sidi Bel Abbès	469,664	26.26%	123,314	79.47%	98,001	IND	Kamel Mir
23 - Annaba	440,258	21.75%	95,750	78.61%	75,273	MSP	Mohamed Daira
23 - Annaba	440,258	21.75%	95,750	78.61%	75,273	MSP	Abdelouahab Hatab
23 - Annaba	440,258	21.75%	95,750	78.61%	75,273	MSP	Noureddine Tebessi
23 - Annaba	440,258	21.75%	95,750	78.61%	75,273	MSP	Mohamed El Hadi Saklouli
23 - Annaba	440,258	21.75%	95,750	78.61%	75,273	FM	Oualid Amrane
23 - Annaba	440,258	21.75%	95,750	78.61%	75,273	FM	Reda Chabane Merah
23 - Annaba	440,258	21.75%	95,750	78.61%	75,273	FM	Sabrina Ahmed Malek
24 - Guelma	378,264	31.42%	118,836	87.99%	104,567	RND	Salah Chettibi
24 - Guelma	378,264	31.42%	118,836	87.99%	104,567	RND	Hicham Sifer
24 - Guelma	378,264	31.42%	118,836	87.99%	104,567	FAN	Yazid Kouarta
24 - Guelma	378,264	31.42%	118,836	87.99%	104,567	FM	Abderrafik Brahmia
24 - Guelma	378,264	31.42%	118,836	87.99%	104,567	PVP	Hocine Hadjadji
25 - Constantine	607,877	19.71%	119,829	81.34%	97,473	MSP	Youcef Adjissa
25 - Constantine	607,877	19.71%	119,829	81.34%	97,473	RND	Mehdi Kouira
25 - Constantine	607,877	19.71%	119,829	81.34%	97,473	FM	Mouloud Laieb
25 - Constantine	607,877	19.71%	119,829	81.34%	97,473	FLN	Saad Beghidja
25 - Constantine	607,877	19.71%	119,829	81.34%	97,473	FJD	Abdelkrim Benkhellef
25 - Constantine	607,877	19.71%	119,829	81.34%	97,473	Binaa	Brahim Amar
25 - Constantine	607,877	19.71%	119,829	81.34%	97,473	PLJ	Fatima Zohra Hadji
25 - Constantine	607,877	19.71%	119,829	81.34%	97,473	IND	Tahar Mahcene
25 - Constantine	607,877	19.71%	119,829	81.34%	97,473	IND	Rachid Bouamri
25 - Constantine	607,877	19.71%	119,829	81.34%	97,473	IND	Mohamed Anouar Bouchouit
25 - Constantine	607,877	19.71%	119,829	81.34%	97,473	IND	Ali Yahi
26 - Médéa	567,813	25.55%	145,058	78.33%	113,618	MSP	Ismail Brahimi
26 - Médéa	567,813	25.55%	145,058	78.33%	113,618	MSP	Mohamed Kebirita
26 - Médéa	567,813	25.55%	145,058	78.33%	113,618	MSP	Mohammed Elamine Mebrouki
26 - Médéa	567,813	25.55%	145,058	78.33%	113,618	FLN	Lakhdar Salmi
26 - Médéa	567,813	25.55%	145,058	78.33%	113,618	FLN	Youcef Hamidi
26 - Médéa	567,813	25.55%	145,058	78.33%	113,618	FLN	Rachid Miloudi
26 - Médéa	567,813	25.55%	145,058	78.33%	113,618	Binaa	Abdelhakim Zergui
26 - Médéa	567,813	25.55%	145,058	78.33%	113,618	Binaa	Rabah Djeddou
27 - Mostaganem	488,385	27.32%	133,420	82.14%	109,586	Binaa	Mohammed Hammou
27 - Mostaganem	488,385	27.32%	133,420	82.14%	109,586	Binaa	Belkacem Bekkaddour Benatia
27 - Mostaganem	488,385	27.32%	133,420	82.14%	109,586	Binaa	Hadjira Abbas
27 - Mostaganem	488,385	27.32%	133,420	82.14%	109,586	Binaa	Hamza Haidra
27 - Mostaganem	488,385	27.32%	133,420	82.14%	109,586	Binaa	Cherif Benhammou
27 - Mostaganem	488,385	27.32%	133,420	82.14%	109,586	Binaa	Abdallah Bouchama
27 - Mostaganem	488,385	27.32%	133,420	82.14%	109,586	Binaa	Ismail Khachaa
27 - Mostaganem	488,385	27.32%	133,420	82.14%	109,586	Binaa	Mohammed Segres
28 - M'Sila	690,926	30.41%	210,095	89.34%	187,709	MSP	Rachid Zine
28 - M'Sila	690,926	30.41%	210,095	89.34%	187,709	MSP	Said Djenaoui
28 - M'Sila	690,926	30.41%	210,095	89.34%	187,709	MSP	Merouane Refice
28 - M'Sila	690,926	30.41%	210,095	89.34%	187,709	RND	Mohamed Fritih
28 - M'Sila	690,926	30.41%	210,095	89.34%	187,709	RND	Soufiane Faid
28 - M'Sila	690,926	30.41%	210,095	89.34%	187,709	RND	Khatem Dahmani
28 - M'Sila	690,926	30.41%	210,095	89.34%	187,709	FLN	Mohamed Mechegueg
28 - M'Sila	690,926	30.41%	210,095	89.34%	187,709	FLN	Rabie Abderrahim
28 - M'Sila	690,926	30.41%	210,095	89.34%	187,709	FLN	Abdelouahab Amrane
28 - M'Sila	690,926	30.41%	210,095	89.34%	187,709	FM	Mohamed Abassi
28 - M'Sila	690,926	30.41%	210,095	89.34%	187,709	FM	Fateh Brikat
29 - Mascara	573,982	25.91%	148,745	79.76%	118,636	MSP	Khalid Chalabi
29 - Mascara	573,982	25.91%	148,745	79.76%	118,636	MSP	Abdelkrim Aid
29 - Mascara	573,982	25.91%	148,745	79.76%	118,636	RND	Elmekki Habib
29 - Mascara	573,982	25.91%	148,745	79.76%	118,636	RND	Benzerga El Akal
29 - Mascara	573,982	25.91%	148,745	79.76%	118,636	FM	Hamid Kerrar
29 - Mascara	573,982	25.91%	148,745	79.76%	118,636	FM	Djaâfar Adda
29 - Mascara	573,982	25.91%	148,745	79.76%	118,636	FLN	Samir Oribi Kouda
29 - Mascara	573,982	25.91%	148,745	79.76%	118,636	FLN	Omar Benaouda
30 - Ouargla	208,188	32.63%	67,922	72.50%	49,241	MSP	Boubekeur Benalia
30 - Ouargla	208,188	32.63%	67,922	72.50%	49,241	FM	Abderrahmane Salhi
30 - Ouargla	208,188	32.63%	67,922	72.50%	49,241	Binaa	Atallah Reziki
31 - Oran	1,052,776	18.10%	190,544	75.48%	143,823	MSP	Mohamed Snoussi
31 - Oran	1,052,776	18.10%	190,544	75.48%	143,823	MSP	Hichem Benhaddad
31 - Oran	1,052,776	18.10%	190,544	75.48%	143,823	MSP	Abdelkrim Tebbal
31 - Oran	1,052,776	18.10%	190,544	75.48%	143,823	RND	Karim Benchekor
31 - Oran	1,052,776	18.10%	190,544	75.48%	143,823	RND	Mohamed Boudouma
31 - Oran	1,052,776	18.10%	190,544	75.48%	143,823	RND	Boumediene Mimoun
31 - Oran	1,052,776	18.10%	190,544	75.48%	143,823	FLN	Mohammed Hadi Arbaoui
31 - Oran	1,052,776	18.10%	190,544	75.48%	143,823	FLN	Oussama Bessiri
31 - Oran	1,052,776	18.10%	190,544	75.48%	143,823	FLN	Mostafa Bouchikhi
31 - Oran	1,052,776	18.10%	190,544	75.48%	143,823	Binaa	Cheikh Cherchar
31 - Oran	1,052,776	18.10%	190,544	75.48%	143,823	Binaa	Rachid Hariz
31 - Oran	1,052,776	18.10%	190,544	75.48%	143,823	Binaa	Younes Khodja
31 - Oran	1,052,776	18.10%	190,544	75.48%	143,823	IND	Brahim Elbachir
31 - Oran	1,052,776	18.10%	190,544	75.48%	143,823	IND	Bahri Al Sid Chikh
31 - Oran	1,052,776	18.10%	190,544	75.48%	143,823	IND	Ouahid Nedjadi
31 - Oran	1,052,776	18.10%	190,544	75.48%	143,823	FM	Kadda Bencherif
31 - Oran	1,052,776	18.10%	190,544	75.48%	143,823	FM	Mohammed Menaouar Hami
32 - El Bayadh	191,561	33.81%	64,760	79.53%	51,506	MSP	Kada Lakhdari
32 - El Bayadh	191,561	33.81%	64,760	79.53%	51,506	FLN	Laid Benamara
32 - El Bayadh	191,561	33.81%	64,760	79.53%	51,506	Binaa	Baghdad Bouguefda
33 - Illizi	55,441	56.37%	31,252	68.07%	21,274	RND	Youcef Tati
33 - Illizi	55,441	56.37%	31,252	68.07%	21,274	FM	Taima Hanouni
33 - Illizi	55,441	56.37%	31,252	68.07%	21,274	IND	Mohamed Ali Ben Sebgag
34 - Bordj Bou Arréridj	457,525	24.50%	112,087	87.10%	97,629	IND	Farès Ziani
34 - Bordj Bou Arréridj	457,525	24.50%	112,087	87.10%	97,629	IND	Abdelhak Belfar
34 - Bordj Bou Arréridj	457,525	24.50%	112,087	87.10%	97,629	IND	Abdelhak Rabia
34 - Bordj Bou Arréridj	457,525	24.50%	112,087	87.10%	97,629	RND	Saci Herizi
34 - Bordj Bou Arréridj	457,525	24.50%	112,087	87.10%	97,629	RND	Derradji Nada
34 - Bordj Bou Arréridj	457,525	24.50%	112,087	87.10%	97,629	FM	Abdelbasset Bouhali
34 - Bordj Bou Arréridj	457,525	24.50%	112,087	87.10%	97,629	FM	Kamal Belakhdar
35 - Boumerdès	522,885	14.50%	75,800	80.71%	61,179	IND	Kamel El Korichi
35 - Boumerdès	522,885	14.50%	75,800	80.71%	61,179	IND	Abdenasser Baaziz
35 - Boumerdès	522,885	14.50%	75,800	80.71%	61,179	IND	Toufik Kebour
35 - Boumerdès	522,885	14.50%	75,800	80.71%	61,179	IND	Toufik Bouherrou
35 - Boumerdès	522,885	14.50%	75,800	80.71%	61,179	MSP	Nabil Rahiche
35 - Boumerdès	522,885	14.50%	75,800	80.71%	61,179	RND	Fatah Djanati
35 - Boumerdès	522,885	14.50%	75,800	80.71%	61,179	FLN	Fatma Zohra Abdi
35 - Boumerdès	522,885	14.50%	75,800	80.71%	61,179	Binaa	Rabah Daimellah
35 - Boumerdès	522,885	14.50%	75,800	80.71%	61,179	PFD	Abderrahmane Kadri
36 - El Tarf	327,559	31.17%	102,098	85.07%	86,857	RND	Mebarek Hamdaoui
36 - El Tarf	327,559	31.17%	102,098	85.07%	86,857	RND	Rabah Foughali
36 - El Tarf	327,559	31.17%	102,098	85.07%	86,857	FJD	Ali Mouilhi
36 - El Tarf	327,559	31.17%	102,098	85.07%	86,857	IND	Ahcene Hani
37 - Tindouf	100,877	53.91%	54,379	68.98%	37,512	FM	Hamdi Bahloul
37 - Tindouf	100,877	53.91%	54,379	68.98%	37,512	FLN	Lehcen Babouzid
37 - Tindouf	100,877	53.91%	54,379	68.98%	37,512	IND	Lahcen Labid
38 - Tissemsilt	180,325	28.98%	52,263	79.78%	41,693	FM	El Hadj Cheikh Berbara
38 - Tissemsilt	180,325	28.98%	52,263	79.78%	41,693	FLN	Ahmed Mouaz
38 - Tissemsilt	180,325	28.98%	52,263	79.78%	41,693	IND	Abdelkader Azziz
39 - El Oued	262,815	28.53%	74,968	89.49%	67,089	MSP	Moradj Dhif
39 - El Oued	262,815	28.53%	74,968	89.49%	67,089	MSP	Tahar Ben Ali
39 - El Oued	262,815	28.53%	74,968	89.49%	67,089	FLN	Mohammed Douyem
39 - El Oued	262,815	28.53%	74,968	89.49%	67,089	Jil Jadid	Fathi Aoun
39 - El Oued	262,815	28.53%	74,968	89.49%	67,089	IND	Mohammed El Hafedh Tidjani
39 - El Oued	262,815	28.53%	74,968	89.49%	67,089	IND	Abdelkader Gori
40 - Khenchela	262,575	36.66%	96,266	93.42%	89,933	FLN	Ali Hamame
40 - Khenchela	262,575	36.66%	96,266	93.42%	89,933	PVP	Ammar Sahraoui
40 - Khenchela	262,575	36.66%	96,266	93.42%	89,933	IND	Hichem Chekhab
40 - Khenchela	262,575	36.66%	96,266	93.42%	89,933	IND	Salim Merah
41 - Souk Ahras	331,058	26.63%	88,165	90.28%	79,591	FM	Kamel Bouaita
41 - Souk Ahras	331,058	26.63%	88,165	90.28%	79,591	FM	Smail Kouadria
41 - Souk Ahras	331,058	26.63%	88,165	90.28%	79,591	FM	Mohamed Faouzi Bendjaballah
41 - Souk Ahras	331,058	26.63%	88,165	90.28%	79,591	FLN	Fawzi Achouri
41 - Souk Ahras	331,058	26.63%	88,165	90.28%	79,591	IND	Hacéne Zairi
42 - Tipaza	446,451	22.55%	100,663	71.46%	71,930	RND	Abdellaziz Ouazene
42 - Tipaza	446,451	22.55%	100,663	71.46%	71,930	RND	Abdelkader Chabni
42 - Tipaza	446,451	22.55%	100,663	71.46%	71,930	IND	Naceira Belhouari
42 - Tipaza	446,451	22.55%	100,663	71.46%	71,930	IND	Salim Abdessedok
42 - Tipaza	446,451	22.55%	100,663	71.46%	71,930	IND	Boualem Gherbi
42 - Tipaza	446,451	22.55%	100,663	71.46%	71,930	IND	Djamel Ouzaghla
43 - Mila	503,263	23.63%	118,897	84.74%	100,754	RND	Monder Bouden
43 - Mila	503,263	23.63%	118,897	84.74%	100,754	RND	Derradji Chadi
43 - Mila	503,263	23.63%	118,897	84.74%	100,754	RND	Lamia Zebouchi
43 - Mila	503,263	23.63%	118,897	84.74%	100,754	RND	Fouad Osmane
43 - Mila	503,263	23.63%	118,897	84.74%	100,754	RND	Ahcene Meftah
43 - Mila	503,263	23.63%	118,897	84.74%	100,754	FLN	Brahim Benabderrahmane
43 - Mila	503,263	23.63%	118,897	84.74%	100,754	FLN	Zakarya Bedroune
43 - Mila	503,263	23.63%	118,897	84.74%	100,754	FLN	Djamel Guerriche
44 - Aïn Defla	492,597	28.01%	137,976	81.94%	113,058	MSP	Ali Guessal
44 - Aïn Defla	492,597	28.01%	137,976	81.94%	113,058	RND	Mokhfi Harizi
44 - Aïn Defla	492,597	28.01%	137,976	81.94%	113,058	FM	Mahfoud Houas
44 - Aïn Defla	492,597	28.01%	137,976	81.94%	113,058	FLN	Ali Djellouli
44 - Aïn Defla	492,597	28.01%	137,976	81.94%	113,058	IND	Kamel Laouissat
44 - Aïn Defla	492,597	28.01%	137,976	81.94%	113,058	IND	Slimane Sahnoun
44 - Aïn Defla	492,597	28.01%	137,976	81.94%	113,058	IND	Mourad Medani
44 - Aïn Defla	492,597	28.01%	137,976	81.94%	113,058	IND	Abdelkader Bradaia
45 - Naâma	169,146	32.72%	55,340	71.00%	39,290	MSP	Abdallah Harchaia
45 - Naâma	169,146	32.72%	55,340	71.00%	39,290	RND	Seddik Zerrouki
45 - Naâma	169,146	32.72%	55,340	71.00%	39,290	FM	Bousmaha Bentaleb
46 - Aïn Témouchent	314,189	26.51%	83,299	76.77%	63,948	FLN	Said Mecheri
46 - Aïn Témouchent	314,189	26.51%	83,299	76.77%	63,948	FLN	Nadjia Douma
46 - Aïn Témouchent	314,189	26.51%	83,299	76.77%	63,948	FBG	Tayeb Daoud Ahmed
46 - Aïn Témouchent	314,189	26.51%	83,299	76.77%	63,948	FBG	Belaredj Benchaib
47 - Ghardaïa	200,378	27.09%	54,278	84.74%	45,996	Binaa	Ali Tarbagou
47 - Ghardaïa	200,378	27.09%	54,278	84.74%	45,996	IND	Brahim Boughali
47 - Ghardaïa	200,378	27.09%	54,278	84.74%	45,996	IND	Abderrahmane Boukermouche
48 - Relizane	438,219	26.55%	116,335	80.02%	93,094	MSP	Abdallah Amari
48 - Relizane	438,219	26.55%	116,335	80.02%	93,094	MSP	Ahmed Bouchama
48 - Relizane	438,219	26.55%	116,335	80.02%	93,094	MSP	Bouziane Mazari
48 - Relizane	438,219	26.55%	116,335	80.02%	93,094	MSP	Abed Benazzouzi
48 - Relizane	438,219	26.55%	116,335	80.02%	93,094	IND	Hadj Benaouda Bettahar
48 - Relizane	438,219	26.55%	116,335	80.02%	93,094	IND	Kaddour Salem
48 - Relizane	438,219	26.55%	116,335	80.02%	93,094	IND	Fatiha Belgacem
48 - Relizane	438,219	26.55%	116,335	80.02%	93,094	IND	Aicha Chouachi
49 - Timimoun	74,637	42.18%	31,483	84.08%	26,471	MSP	Mohammed Salem Nekkar
49 - Timimoun	74,637	42.18%	31,483	84.08%	26,471	FLN	Ahmed Mazouzi
49 - Timimoun	74,637	42.18%	31,483	84.08%	26,471	IND	Abdelkrim Boukhari
50 - Bordj Badji Mokhtar	37,545	75.93%	28,509	87.94%	25,071	RND	Sidi Anarab
50 - Bordj Badji Mokhtar	37,545	75.93%	28,509	87.94%	25,071	FLN	Ghali Lansari
50 - Bordj Badji Mokhtar	37,545	75.93%	28,509	87.94%	25,071	IND	Mohamed Ourti
51 - Ouled Djellal	104,786	28.73%	30,105	90.98%	27,389	FLN	Adel Meitah
51 - Ouled Djellal	104,786	28.73%	30,105	90.98%	27,389	Binaa	Abderrazek Bezziou
51 - Ouled Djellal	104,786	28.73%	30,105	90.98%	27,389	IND	Abdallah Chenini
52 - Béni Abbès	38,120	46.14%	17,590	77.99%	13,719	MSP	Laid Boukerraf
52 - Béni Abbès	38,120	46.14%	17,590	77.99%	13,719	Binaa	Mostapha Lounis
52 - Béni Abbès	38,120	46.14%	17,590	77.99%	13,719	IND	Ahmed Hadjraoui
53 - In Salah	44,104	51.11%	22,542	85.84%	19,349	MSP	Abderrahmane Baglab
53 - In Salah	44,104	51.11%	22,542	85.84%	19,349	FLN	Mohammed Ben Hachem
53 - In Salah	44,104	51.11%	22,542	85.84%	19,349	Binaa	Aloata Hadj Osmane
54 - In Guezzam	28,716	66.82%	19,189	85.50%	16,406	RND	Mohammed Mansouri
54 - In Guezzam	28,716	66.82%	19,189	85.50%	16,406	FLN	Kada Karbadou
54 - In Guezzam	28,716	66.82%	19,189	85.50%	16,406	PFD	Abdellah Khanissi
55 - Touggourt	168,206	31.88%	53,626	84.87%	45,511	MSP	Moussa Kherfi
55 - Touggourt	168,206	31.88%	53,626	84.87%	45,511	RND	Ahmed Boubekeur
55 - Touggourt	168,206	31.88%	53,626	84.87%	45,511	FM	Lazhar Degla
56 - Djanet	28,483	50.96%	14,514	72.96%	10,589	IND	Ayssa Elhousni
56 - Djanet	28,483	50.96%	14,514	72.96%	10,589	IND	Brahim Fekhour
56 - Djanet	28,483	50.96%	14,514	72.96%	10,589	IND	Mahdi Benabderrahmane
57 - El M'Ghaier	95,170	40.79%	38,819	91.63%	35,569	MSP	Saliha Kachi
57 - El M'Ghaier	95,170	40.79%	38,819	91.63%	35,569	FLN	Abdenacer Ardjoun
57 - El M'Ghaier	95,170	40.79%	38,819	91.63%	35,569	IND	Hicham Bouchemal
58 - El Meniaâ	42,355	40.40%	17,110	85.69%	14,661	IND	Abdelhamid Bellakehal
58 - El Meniaâ	42,355	40.40%	17,110	85.69%	14,661	IND	Mokhtar Bousbia
58 - El Meniaâ	42,355	40.40%	17,110	85.69%	14,661	IND	Salem Zentar
61 - First Diaspora Region	424,346	3.29%	13,967	87.69%	12,248	MSP	Abdelouahab Yagoubi
61 - First Diaspora Region	424,346	3.29%	13,967	87.69%	12,248	FLN	Melissa Benouadfel
62 - Second Diaspora Region	293,782	4.61%	13,529	85.37%	11,550	MSP	Tawfiq Khedim
62 - Second Diaspora Region	293,782	4.61%	13,529	85.37%	11,550	FNA	Mohamed Bekhadra
63 - Third Diaspora Region	53,291	16.58%	8,838	78.86%	6,970	FLN	Youcef Rahmania
63 - Third Diaspora Region	53,291	16.58%	8,838	78.86%	6,970	Binaa	Mohamed Ouakli
64 - Fourth Diaspora Region	131,464	4.49%	5,908	80.15%	4,735	MSP	Brahim Dekhinet
64 - Fourth Diaspora Region	131,464	4.49%	5,908	80.15%	4,735	IND	Fares Rahmani
