= Council of the Nation =

Upper house of Algerian Parliament

Council of the Nation: مجلس الأمة
- 10th Legislature
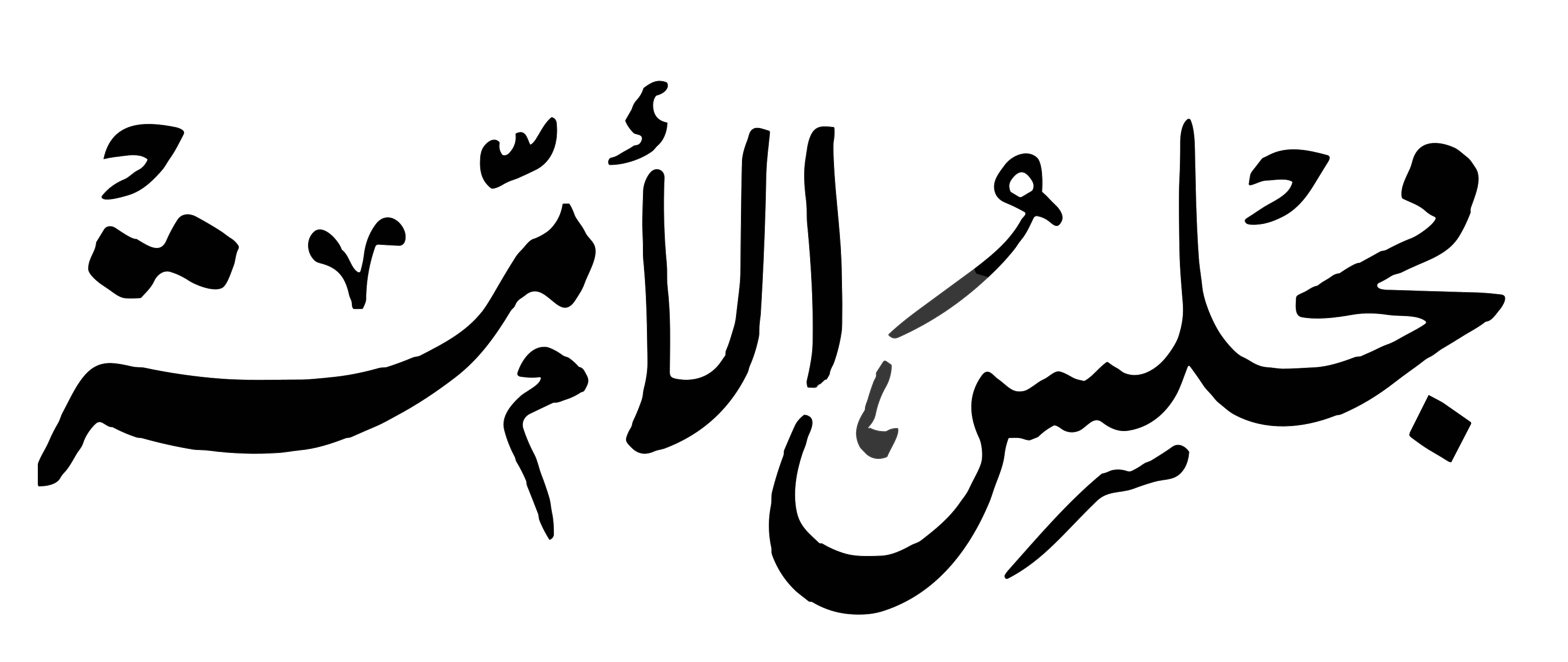

Type
- Type: Upper house of the Parliament of Algeria

History
- Founded: 1997

Leadership
- President: Azouz Nasri, Independent since 19 May 2025

Structure
- Seats: 174
- Political groups: Government (66): FLN (41); RND (25); Opposition (35): FM (15); Binaa (7); FFS (4); MSP (4); PVP (2); TAJ (2); PFJ (1); Others (73): Appointed Members (58); Independent (15)
- Length of term: 6 years

Elections
- Voting system: Two-round indirect election (2/3); Appointed by the president of Algeria (1/3)
- Last election: 9 March 2025

Meeting place
- Palace of the Council of the Nation, Algiers

Website
- www.majliselouma.dz

The Council of the Nation (Arabic: مجلس الأمة, romanized: Majlis al-Ummah) is the upper house of the Algerian Parliament. It is composed of 174 members, 2/3 of which are elected indirectly and 1/3 of which are appointed by the president of Algeria.

Abdelkader Bensalah was elected as President of the Council of the Nation on July 2, 2002, re-elected on January 11, 2007 and January 10, 2008. Zohra Drif was elected as Vice President of the Council of the Nation on September 10, 2002, re-elected on March 7, 2007 and March 8, 2008.

They were last elected on 9 March 2025.

== Composition ==
The Council has 174 members:

- 116 indirectly elected in secret ballot (2/3)
- 58 appointed by the President of the Republic (1/3)

== Elections ==
There are 58 dual-member constituencies (two seats) corresponding to the number of wilayas (provinces) of the country.

The election shall be by majority vote in two rounds by and from an electoral college composed of elected popular wilaya assemblies and communal people's assemblies (approx. 15,000 members).

Members must be at least 40 years old The term of office is six years. The Chamber is renewed by half every three years.

Board member commits himself before his peers who can revoke his mandate by a majority of its members, if it commits a shameful action for his mission.

== Presidency ==
- President: Azouz Nasri (independent),
- Vice-Presidents (since 28 May 2025):
  - Rabah Beghali,
  - Miloud Hanafi,
  - Omar Khemayas,
  - Mourad Lekhal,
  - Abdelkrim Boughanem.

== See also ==
- List of presidents of the Council of the Nation (Algeria)
- Politics of Algeria
- Parliament of Algeria
- People's National Assembly
- List of legislatures by country
