= Democratic National Rally =

Political party in Algeria

Democratic National Rally: التجمع الوطني الديموقراطي
- Secretary-General: Monder Bouden
- Founded: 21 February 1997
- Headquarters: Les Asphodèles 10, Ben Aknoun, Algiers
- Youth wing: RND Youth
- Ideology: Algerian nationalism; Populism; Liberal conservatism; Economic liberalism; 1997–1999: Pro-Zéroual
- Political position: Centre-right
- International affiliation: Centrist Democrat International
- Colors: Blue; Green; Red
- Council of the Nation: 25 / 174
- People's National Assembly: 74 / 407
- People's Provincial Assemblies: 527 / 2,004
- Municipalities: 451 / 1,540
- People's Municipal Assemblies: 6,521 / 24,876

Website
- rnd.dz

The Democratic National Rally (Arabic: التجمع الوطني الديمقراطي, romanized: al-Tajammuʻ al-Waṭanī al-Dīmuqrāṭī; French: Rassemblement national démocratique, RND) is a political party in Algeria.

== History ==
The RND was founded on 21 February 1997 in the midst of the Algerian Civil War for supporters of Liamine Zéroual, former head of ground forces of the Algerian military who had been elected president less than two years earlier (16 November 1995). Zéroual had run as an independent and won 60% of votes cast. In the Algerian Parliamentary elections held on 5 June 1997 the RND received more votes than any other party 156 out of 380 seats. In the next parliamentary elections five years later it came in third polling only 9.5% of the vote, winning 47 of 380 seats in the Algerian Parliament. In the 2007 election it obtained 10.33% of the vote and 61 seats out of the 389 seats. It is part of the presidential alliance, a three party political alliance created in 2005, the other two parties being the former sole legal party, the National Liberation Front, and the Movement for the Society of Peace.

The Georgetown University Berkley Center describes the RND as having "replaced" the FLN as the Algerian "state party" temporarily for the 1995 and 1997 elections "after the FLN was defeated by the Islamic Salvation Front (FIS) in the 1991–1992 national legislative elections". That election was canceled by a military coup and the civil war that followed killed as many 200,000 Algerians, but once the Islamist insurgents were pacified to a large degree, the "FLN regained its place as the majority and ruling party".

The party held its Second Congress on 15–17 May 2003.

RND Secretary-General Ahmed Ouyahia was appointed as prime minister on 23 June 2008.

== Electoral history ==
=== Presidential elections ===
Election	Candidate	Votes	%	Result
2004	Abdelaziz Bouteflika	8,651,723	84.99%	Elected ✓
2019	Azzedine Mihoubi	619,225	7.28%	Lost ✗

=== People's National Assembly elections ===
Election	Leader	Votes	%	Seats	+/–	Position
1997	Ahmed Ouyahia	3,533,434	33.7%	156 / 380	▲156	▲1st
2002	Ahmed Ouyahia	610,461	8.2%	47 / 389	▼109	▼3rd
2007	Ahmed Ouyahia	597,712	10.44%	62 / 386	▲15	▲2nd
2012	Ahmed Ouyahia	524,057	6.86%	68 / 462	▲6	2nd
2017	Ahmed Ouyahia	964,560	14.91%	97 / 462	▲32	2nd
2021	Tayeb Zitouni	198,758	4.31%	58 / 407	▼39	▼3rd
2026	Monder Bouden	641,623	15.31%	74 / 407	▲16	▲2nd

== See also ==
- Category:Democratic National Rally politicians
