= Parliament of Algeria =

Bicameral legislature of Algeria

Parliament of Algeria: البرلمان الجزائري

Type
- Type: Bicameralism
- Houses: Council of the Nation; People's National Assembly

Leadership
- President of the Council: Azouz Nasri, Independent
- President of the Assembly: Khalida Boufedeche, FLN
- Seats: 606 members (144 (2/3 of which are elected indirectly and 1/3 of which are appointed by the president) and 462)

Elections
- Council of the Nation voting system: Indirect election
- People's National Assembly voting system: Direct election
- Last Council of the Nation election: 9 March 2025
- Last People's National Assembly election: 2 July 2026

Meeting place
- Palace of Nations, Club of Pines, Chéraga, Algiers, Algeria

The Parliament of Algeria is the legislative assembly of Algeria. It consists of two chambers:

- The Council of the Nation (Upper Chamber)
- The People's National Assembly (Lower Chamber)

== See also ==
- Politics of Algeria
- List of legislatures by country
