= Rally for Hope for Algeria =

Algerian political party

Rally for Hope in Algeria تجمع أمل الجزائر
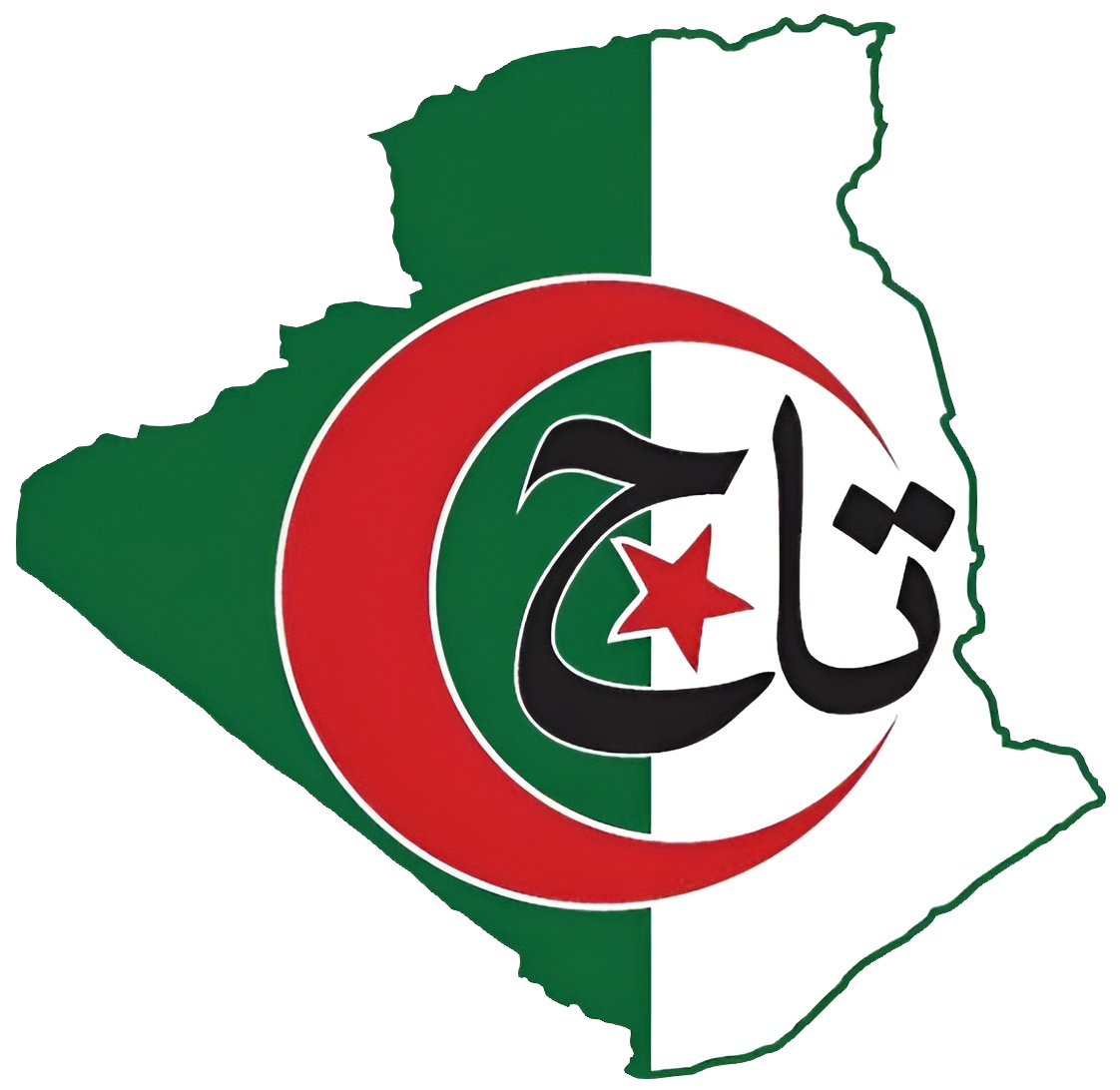
- President: Fatma Zohra Zerouati
- Founded: 2012
- Split from: Movement of Society for Peace
- Headquarters: Algiers
- Ideology: Algerian nationalism; Transversalism; Militarism
- Political position: Centre
- People's National Assembly: 3 / 407
- Council of the Nation: 2 / 174

The Rally for Hope for Algeria (Arabic: تجمع أمل الجزائر, TAJ/تاج), also known as the Rally for Hope in Algeria, the Rally of Algerian Hope and Algeria's Hope Rally, is an Algerian political party, established in 2012. Its official slogan is "Loyalty – Hope – Building".

== History ==
The TAJ party was founded in 2012 in the aftermath of the Arab Spring protests within Algeria. It was founded by Amar Ghoul, a former member of the Islamist Movement of Society for Peace, who left the party that same year to start his own. According to the party charter, the TAJ party was founded as response to the national, regional and international changes in the political reality and to the popular demands within Algeria for political reform. He has since served in several ministerial positions in the Algerian government, such as the Minister of Transport and the Minister of National Planning, Tourism and Craft Industry. He is known for having close ties with the Bouteflika government. Prior to the 2019-2020 Algerian protests, he strongly supported a fourth term for reigning President Abdelaziz Bouteflika, and was known for being a personal friend of the president's brother, Saïd Bouteflika.

The party ran for the first time in the 2017 Algerian parliamentary elections and gained 19 seats in the People's National Assembly, or 4.18% of the vote.

In July 2019, Ghoul was arrested under corruption charges and ceased functioning as leader of the party. In September 2020, Fatma-Zohra Zerouati was unanimously elected as the new leader of the party. The party ran in the 2021 Algerian legislative elections but did not receive enough votes for a seat in parliament.

== Ideology ==
In its charter, the TAJ party defines itself as a big tent Algerian nationalist party, seeking to unite within it all parts of Algerian society, whether "Nationalists or Democrats". It states that it seeks to provide a solution for the "real problems of the citizens", while creating a new, unifying political atmosphere and moving away from ideological conflicts towards constructive political discussions.

The party presents its core principles as based upon Islam, Arabic identity, Amazigh identity, the Proclamation of November 1, 1954, the Constitution, the cultural heritage of the Algerian people and human values and experiences.

It defines its values as consisting of: Man, the Family, Society, the State, Liberty, Justice, Human Rights, Citizenship, Science, Work, Authenticity and Modernity, Moderation, Constructive Participation and Peaceful Coexistence. With these goals, principles and values it seeks to "build a safe, stable, developed, strong and innovative Algeria."
