= National Construction Movement =

Algerian political party

National Construction Movement حركة البناء الوطني
- Leader: Abdelkader Bengrina
- Founded: March 2013; 13 years ago
- Registered: 2014
- Split from: Movement of Society for Peace
- Headquarters: Draria
- Ideology: Islamism; Islamic democracy; Populism; Social conservatism
- Political position: Right-wing
- People's National Assembly: 40 / 407
- Council of the Nation: 7 / 174

Website
- elbinaawatani.com

The National Construction Movement (Arabic: حركة البناء الوطني, romanized: Harakat Al-bina' Al-watanii), sometimes translated as the Movement for National Construction, is an Algerian political party.

== History ==
Former logo of the National Construction Movement

The party was founded in March 2013 by Abdelkader Bengrina, a former member of the Movement of Society for Peace, who left the party in 2008, alongside other dissidents. The party was officially accredited by the government the following year.

== Electoral history ==
=== Presidential elections ===
Election	Candidate	Votes	%	Result
2019	Abdelkader Bengrina	1,477,836	17.37%	2nd

=== People's National Assembly elections ===
Election	Leader	Votes	%	Seats	Position
2021	Abdelkader Bengrina	106,203	▲2.30%	39 / 407	▲5th
2026	Abdelkader Bengrina	376,283	▲8.98%	40 / 407	5th

== See also ==
- List of Islamic political parties
