= Future Front =

Algerian political party

Future Front جبهة المستقبل
- President: Fateh Boutbig
- Founder: Abdelaziz Belaïd
- Founded: 9 February 2012; 14 years ago
- Split from: National Liberation Front (FLN)
- Headquarters: Algiers
- Ideology: Algerian nationalism
- Political position: Centre
- People's National Assembly: 56 / 407
- Council of the Nation: 15 / 174

Website
- http://frontelmoustakbal.dz/

The Future Front (Arabic: جبهة المستقبل, romanized: Jabhat al-Mustaqbal) is an Algerian political party.

== History ==
The Future Front was founded on February 9, 2012 after its leader, Abdelaziz Belaïd, split from the National Liberation Front (FLN). It is a centrist party, dominated by youth and holds a conciliatory approach towards the ruling regime. The party won two seats in the 2012 Algerian parliamentary elections and 14 seats in the 2017 elections. Its presidential candidate and leader of the party, Abdelaziz Belaïd, came third in the 2014 Algerian presidential election with 3.36% of the vote. In the 2019 presidential elections, his support rose to 6.67% but he only came fifth in the race.

In 2019, during the transitional period after the resignation of President Abdelaziz Bouteflika, the Future Front called for the inclusion of "all the fringes of society" in the process of the presidential elections, so that those elections may be "transparent and regular". In June 2020, a representative of the party, Samir Chaabna, was appointed as Deputy Minister of the PM in charge of connections with Algerians abroad.

In the June 2021 elections, despite receiving fewer votes than in previous elections, the party made significant gains in its representation, going from 14 seats in the 462-seat parliament to 48 seats in the new 407-seat parliament, making it the 4th largest party in the Algerian People's National Assembly.

== Electoral history ==
=== Presidential elections ===
Election	Party candidate	Votes	%	Result
2014	Abdelaziz Belaïd	328,030	3.06	Lost ✗
2019	Abdelaziz Belaïd	568,000	6.67	Lost ✗

=== People's National Assembly elections ===
Election	Party leader	Votes	%	Seats	Position
2012	Abdelaziz Belaïd	174,706	▲1.87	2 / 462	▲18th
2017	Abdelaziz Belaïd	265,564	▲4.11	14 / 462	▲5th
2021	Abdelaziz Belaïd	153,987	▼3.34	48 / 407	▲4th
2026	Fateh Boutbig	523,915	▲12.50	56 / 407	▲3rd
