= Socialist Forces Front =

Political party in Algeria

Socialist Forces Front: جبهة القوى الاشتراكية Tirni n Iɣallen Inemlayen Front des Forces Socialistes
- Abbreviation: FFS
- First National Secretary: Youcef Aouchiche
- Founder: Hocine Aït Ahmed
- Founded: 29 September 1963; 62 years ago
- Legalised: 1990; 36 years ago
- Split from: FLN
- Headquarters: Algiers, Algeria
- Ideology: Social democracy; Secularism; Algerian nationalism; Berberism
- Political position: Centre-left
- National affiliation: Forces of the Democratic Alternative (2019–2020)
- International affiliation: Progressive Alliance; Socialist International
- Colours: Blue
- Council of the Nation: 4 / 174
- People's National Assembly: 12 / 407
- People's Provincial Assemblies: 63 / 2,004
- Municipalities: 64 / 1,540
- People's Municipal Assemblies: 897 / 24,786

Website
- www.ffs.dz

The Socialist Forces Front (Arabic: جبهة القوى الاشتراكية; Berber languages: Tirni n (Y)iɣallen Inemlayen; French: Front des Forces Socialistes, FFS) is a social democratic and secularist political party, mainly supported by Berbers in Algeria. The FFS is a member of the Socialist International and the Progressive Alliance. It led an unsuccessful rebellion against the Algerian government from 1963 to 1964.

== History and profile ==
=== Establishment and rebellion (1963) ===
The party was formed by Hocine Aït Ahmed on 29 September 1963 in the city of Tizi Ouzou to oppose Ben Bella's government. Following the party's creation, Aït Ahmed began an armed rebellion and captured a number of towns in Kabylia. The Ben Bella government, aided by the National Liberation Army, swiftly took control of the dissident towns during a mostly bloodless confrontation. The FFS rebels were not supported by the people and were pushed into the mountains by the government's army. Preferring to avoid direct conflict, the FFS and its soldiers retracted into the mountains from where they could launch guerrilla tactics. The rebellion was defeated in 1964 and Hocine Aït Ahmed was arrested and sentenced to death.

The 1963 conflict resulted in 10 months of armed confrontation in the region, leaving more than four hundred dead, and most of the FLN leaders from Kabylia and the eastern provinces were either executed or forced into exile. Hocine Aït Ahmed escaped prison in 1966 and fled to Switzerland.

=== Party legalization (1990) ===
The party was legalised in 1990. It however boycotted the 2002 and 2007 legislative elections and the 2009 presidential election "calling it systematic electoral fraud in favour of the ruling parties".

=== 2012 legislative election ===
Though former Prime Minister Sid Ahmed Ghozali urged a boycott on the grounds that the election would be "a foregone conclusion", the party decided to participate in the 2012 legislative election. Apart from international monitors being invited to observe the process, Algerian Workers' Party leader Louisa Hanoune, a quite successful candidate in the 2009 presidential elections, had announced to work towards an alliance of the two parties.

Hocine Aït Ahmed wrote to the Council of the Nation saying that "participation in these elections is a tactical necessity for the FFS, which falls in line with (its) construction strategy of peaceful democratic alternative to this despotic regime, corrupt and destructive. [The purpose of the party] does not lie in a quota of seats to reach [but] in mobilising political[ly] and peaceful[ly] in our party and our people." With an electoral result of mere 2.47%, the party reached 27 seats making it the second-largest opposition power after the Islamist Green Algeria Alliance.

== See also ==
- Berber people
- Politics of Algeria
- Rally for Culture and Democracy (RCD)
- Arouch Movement - A political organization modelled on traditional Berber village councils.
