= 2012 Algerian parliamentary election =

- 10 May 2012
- All 462 seats in the People's National Assembly; 232 seats needed for a majority
- Turnout: 43.14% (▲7.47pp)
Party	Leader	Vote %	Seats	+/–
FLN	Abdelmalek Sellal	17.35	208	+72
RND	Ahmed Ouyahia	6.86	68	+6
Green Alliance	Bouguerra Soltani	6.22	49	−10
PT	Louisa Hanoune	3.71	24	−2
PJD	Abdallah Djaballah	3.05	8	+8
FNA	Moussa Touati	2.60	9	−4
FFS	Ali Laskri	2.47	27	+27
FM	Abdelaziz Belaïd	2.29	2	+2
FC		2.28	4	+4
MPA	Amara Benyounès	2.17	7	+7
FNHS		1.84	3	+3
PFD		1.74	5	+5
El Karama		1.70	2	+2
Ahd 54	Ali Fawzi Rebaine	1.57	3	+1
MNE		1.56	2	0
RA		1.54	2	+1
El-Infitah		1.52	1	−2
MCL		1.51	1	+1
RPR		1.50	2	0
UFDS		1.50	3	+3
PNSD		1.50	4	+2
PRA		1.46	1	−3
ANR		1.43	3	−1
FNIC		1.41	1	−2
PJ		1.34	2	+2
FND		1.33	1	0
PE		0.64	2	+2
Independents	–	8.79	18	−15
This lists parties that won seats. See the complete results below.
Prime Minister before	Prime Minister after
Ahmed Ouyahia; RND	Abdelmalek Sellal; FLN

Parliamentary elections were held in Algeria on 10 May 2012. The incumbent coalition, consisting of the National Liberation Front (FLN) of President Abdelaziz Bouteflika and the National Rally for Democracy (RND) of Prime Minister Ahmed Ouyahia, held on to power after winning a majority of seats. The Islamist parties of the Green Algeria Alliance lost seats.

== Background ==
Following events in the Arab Spring, Algeria faced initial large scale protests but have since dwindled.

An election in 1991 that resulted in a plurality for the Islamic Salvation Front was annulled by the military amid fears of an Islamist takeover causing the Algerian Civil War.

== Parties ==
=== Workers' Party ===
The Workers' Party (PT) announced its participation on 29 February. Louisa Hanoune has previously clarified that the party had worked with the Socialist Forces Front and would look towards an alliance between the two parties. Louisa Hanoune has become the most popular woman in Algeria after the party came second in the 2009 Algerian presidential election. Hanoune said the party's manifesto would be similar to previous elections, including improved employment opportunities, equal rights for women, the elimination of the Algerian Family Code, making Tamazight the second official language, eliminating laws that condemn people for their religion, sexuality or other discriminatory acts and make Algeria a pioneer in production. She also criticized the creation of new parties that have emerged in January and has asked who funds these new parties.

=== National Rally for Democracy ===
The National Rally for Democracy has announced its participation in the election. Ahmed Ouyahia is the party's general secretary and the incumbent prime minister. Ouyahia and Hanoune exchanged strong words in the Algerian media. Hanoune complained about his decision of the military record to the voters, showing that as evidence of possible fraud.

=== Socialist Forces Front ===
The Socialist Forces Front (FFS) has announced its participation on 29 February. Hocine Aït Ahmed wrote to the National Council saying that "participation in these elections is a tactical necessity for the FFS, which falls in line with (its) construction strategy of peaceful democratic alternative to this despotic regime, corrupt and destructive. [The purpose of the party] does not lie in a quota of seats to reach [but] in mobilising political[ly] and peaceful[ly] in our party and our people." The party had boycotted the two previous elections because of what it called systematic electoral fraud in favour of the ruling parties.

=== National Liberation Front ===
So far, the National Liberation Front (FLN) has not made any official publication of who will be their prime ministerial candidate. The FLN is the biggest party in Algeria and includes President Abdelaziz Bouteflika. There are rumours that its candidate representing the FLN will be Khalida Toumi, the incumbent Minister of Culture.

=== Green Algeria Alliance ===
On 8 March, three Algerian Islamist parties (Movement of Society for Peace, Islamic Renaissance Movement and the Movement for National Reform) formed the Green Algeria Alliance. Its secretary general is Bouguerra Soltani. Sultani said that the purpose of this alliance is to consolidate the voter base of the three political parties.

=== Gallery of candidates ===
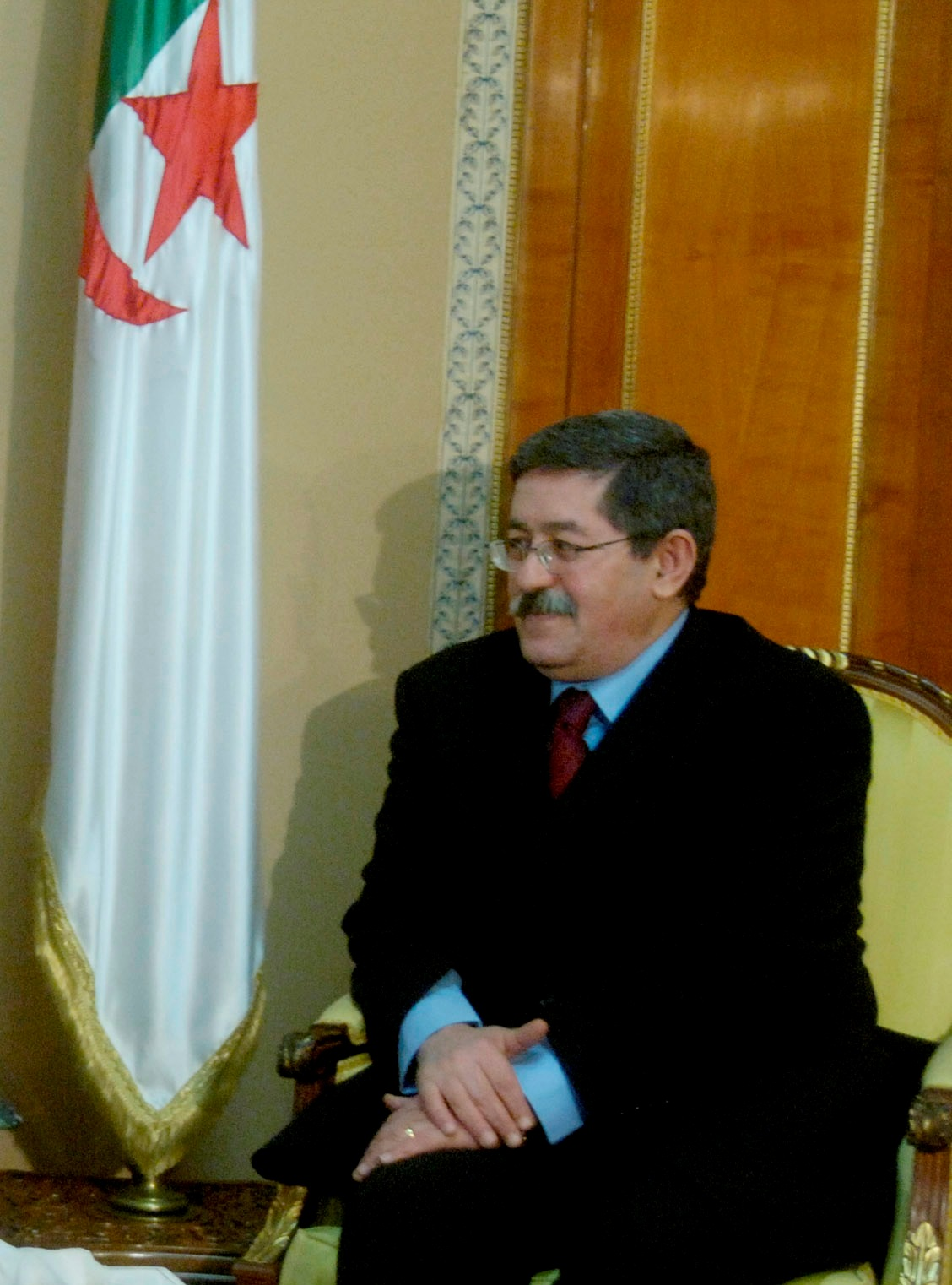
National Rally for Democracy: Ahmed Ouyahia

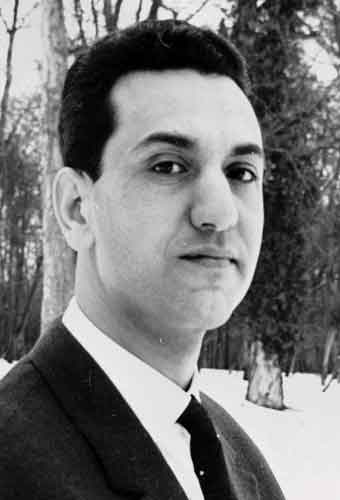
Socialist Forces Front: Hocine Aït Ahmed

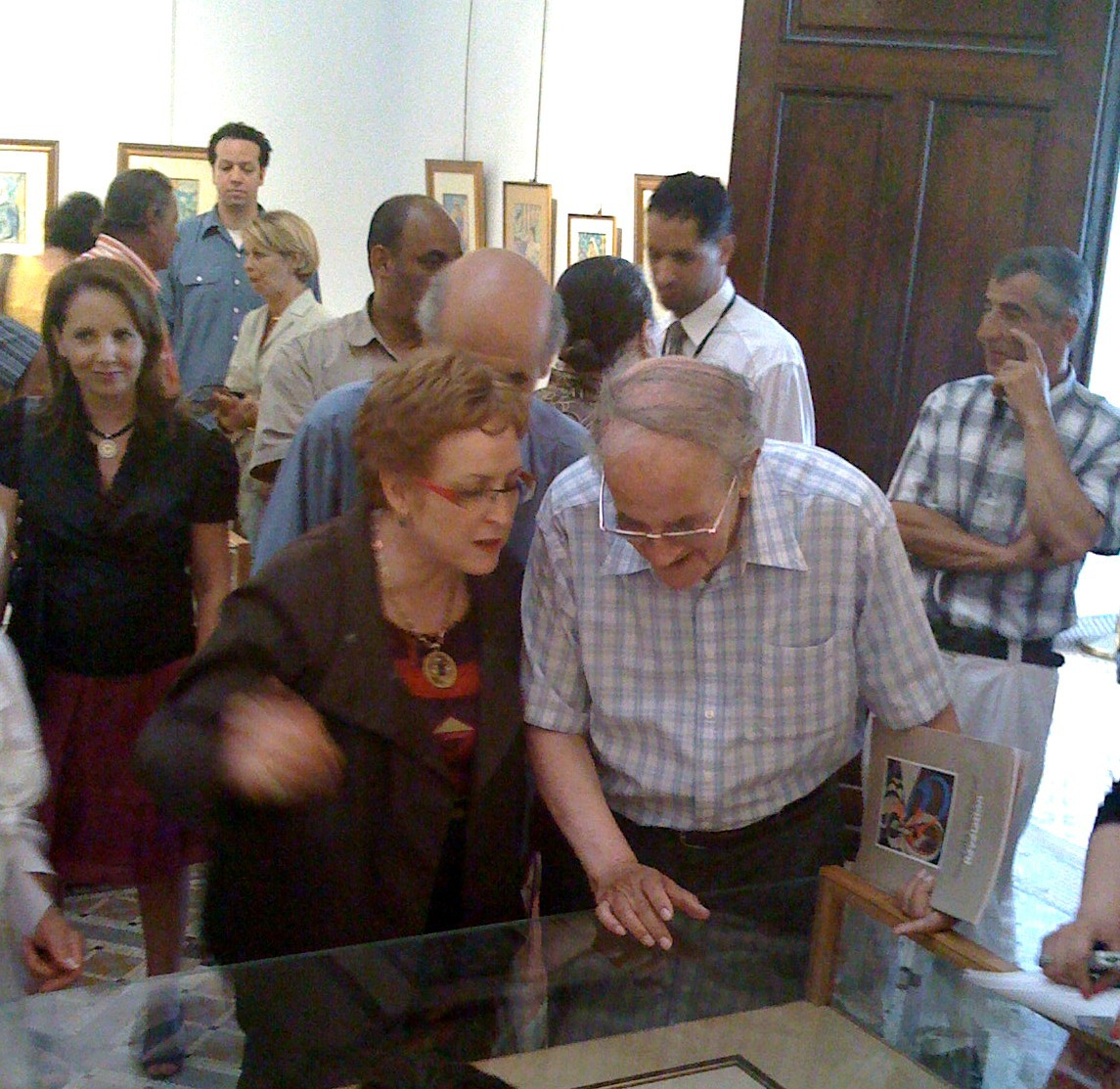
National Liberation Front: Khalida Toumi

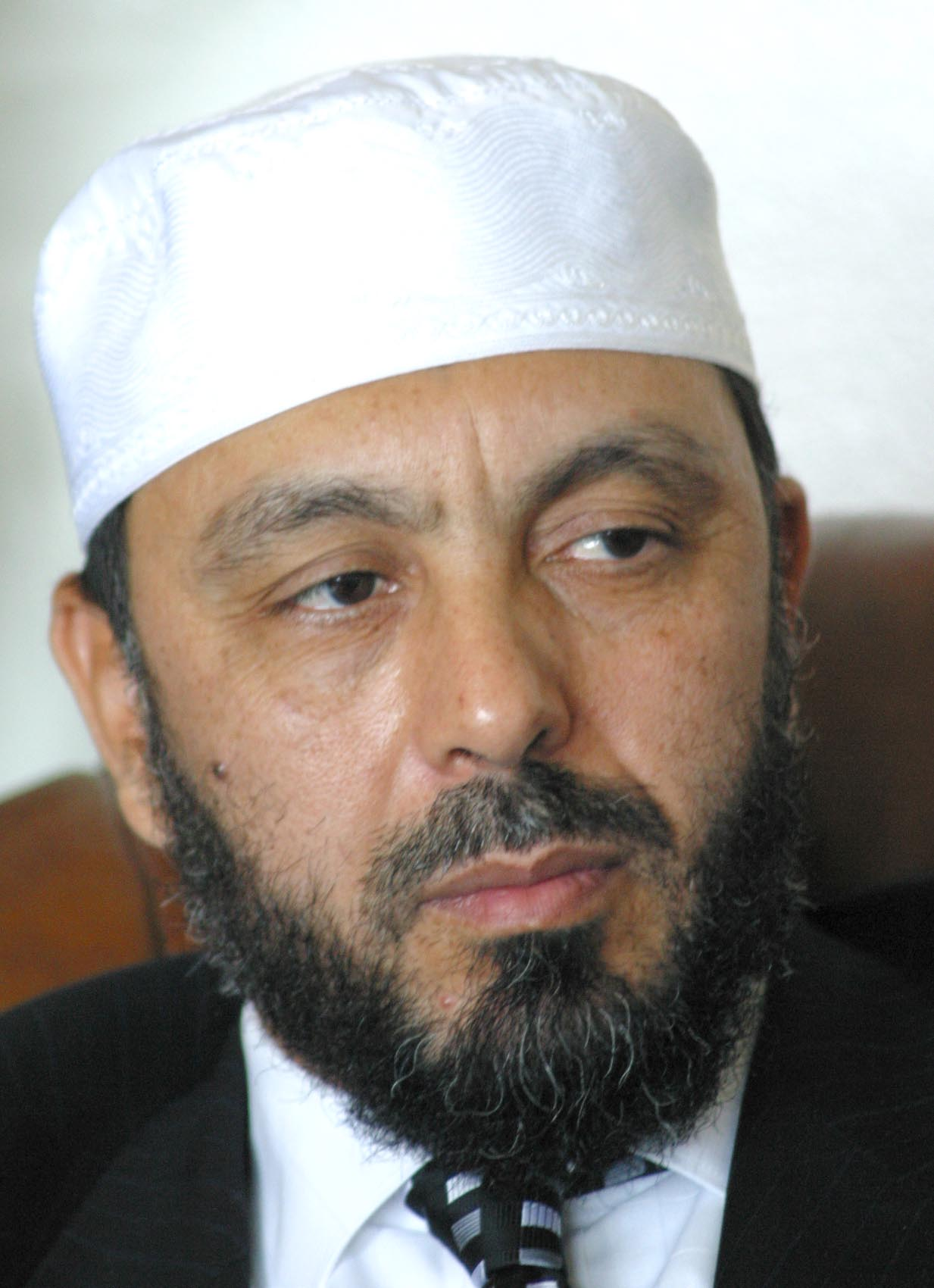
Abdallah Djaballah

== Boycott ==
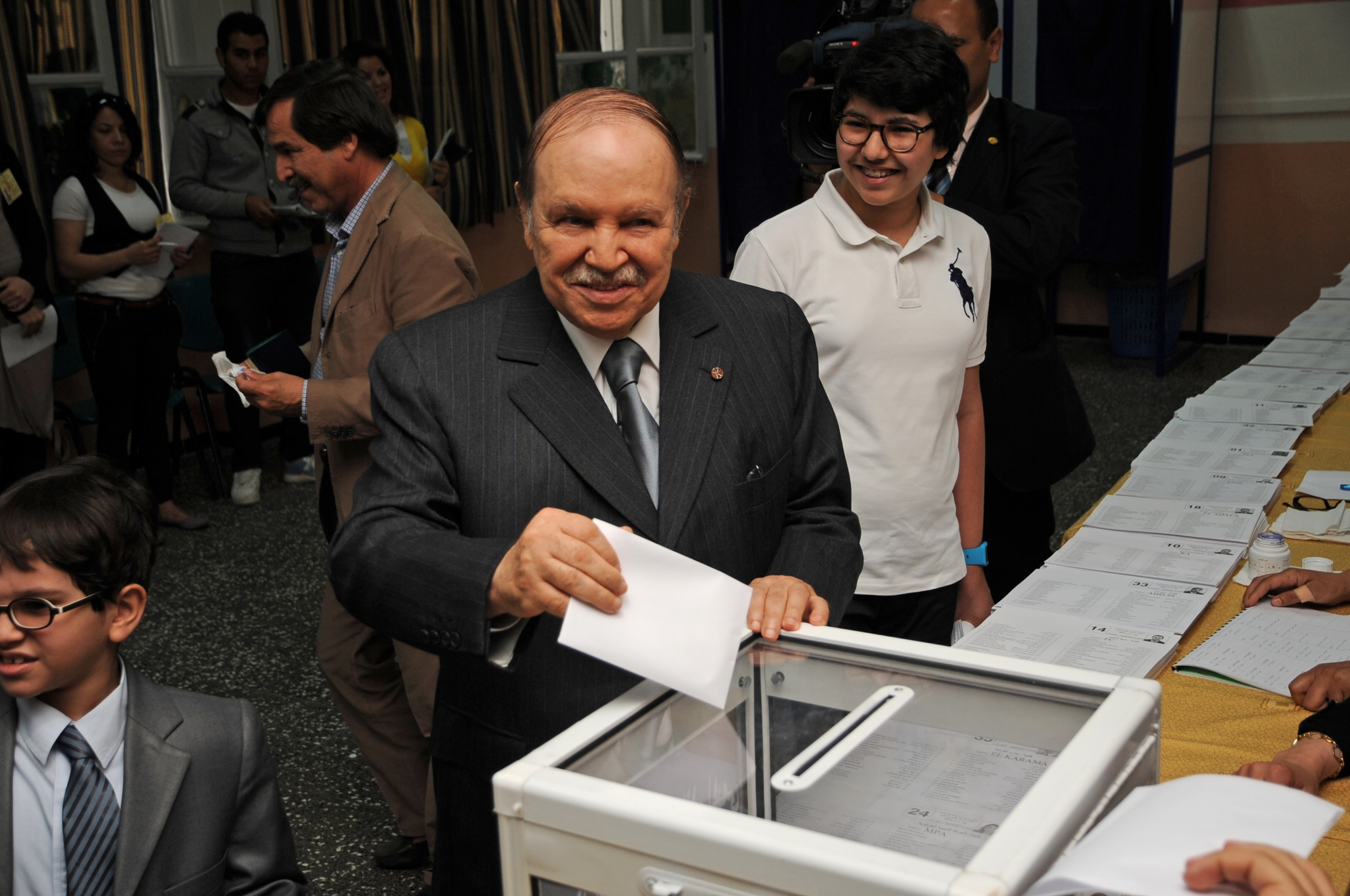
President Abdelaziz Bouteflika casts his ballot in the elections.

The Socialist Forces Front decided to forgo a decision to boycott the election after international monitors were invited to observe the process. However former Prime Minister Sid Ahmed Ghozali urged a boycott on the grounds that the election would be "a foregone conclusion. Social media was abuzz with many of the country's youth calling for an abstention from voting.

== Monitors ==
Algeria allowed foreign electoral monitors for the election. The monitors would include the Carter Center, the National Democratic Institute and other NGOs from the European Union and the Arab League. Overall, there were over 500 international observers. The government also called the election the "Algerian Spring" billing it as the freest election in over 20 years.

== Results ==
2012 Algerian legislative election participation by province

Almost 22 million are eligible to vote for 44 parties following legalisation of most parties this year. Voter turnout was expected to be low, possibly less than 35% from the last election. Bouteflika called for a high participation. The turnout was 42.36%.

Party	Votes	%	Seats	+/–
National Liberation Front	1,324,363	17.35	208	+72
National Rally for Democracy	524,057	6.86	68	+6
Green Algeria Alliance (MSP—Nahda—Islah)	475,049	6.22	49	–10
Workers' Party	283,585	3.71	24	–2
Justice and Development Party	232,676	3.05	8	+8
Algerian National Front	198,544	2.60	9	–4
Socialist Forces Front	188,275	2.47	27	+27
Future Front	174,708	2.29	2	+2
Front of Change	173,981	2.28	4	+4
Algerian Popular Movement	165,600	2.17	7	+7
National Front for Social Justice	140,223	1.84	3	+3
New Dawn	132,492	1.74	5	+5
Dignity Party	129,427	1.70	2	+2
Ahd 54	120,201	1.57	3	+1
National Movement of Hope	119,253	1.56	2	0
Algerian Rally	117,549	1.54	2	+1
El-Infitah Movement	116,384	1.52	1	–2
Movement of Free Citizens	115,631	1.51	1	+1
Republican Patriotic Rally	114,651	1.50	2	0
Union of Democratic and Social Forces	114,481	1.50	3	+3
National Party for Solidarity and Development	114,372	1.50	4	+2
Party of Algerian Renewal	111,218	1.46	1	–3
National Republican Alliance	109,331	1.43	3	–1
National Front of Independents for Understanding	107,833	1.41	1	–2
Party of Youth	102,663	1.34	2	+2
National Democratic Front	101,643	1.33	1	0
Algerian Light Party	48,943	0.64	2	+2
Other parties	1,306,656	17.11	0	–22
Independents	671,190	8.79	18	–15
Total	7,634,979	100.00	462	+73
Valid votes	7,634,979	81.75		
Invalid/blank votes	1,704,047	18.25		
Total votes	9,339,026	100.00		
Registered voters/turnout	21,645,841	43.14		
Source: El Watan, Adam Carr's Election Archive, IPU

== Reactions ==
Domestic

Interior Minister Daho Ould Kablia announced the result saying that "the election has reinforced the Algerian people's attachment to the values of peace and stability."

- Green Algeria Alliance: Hamas leader Bouguerra Soltani commented: "We are surprised by these results, which are illogical, unreasonable and unacceptable". He attributed the result to "those who would like to return to a single party rule." Soltani estimated that the result would "send the Algerian Spring backwards" and announced that the Islamists would consider boycotting parliament or to ally with the left-wing and liberal opposition against the government.
- Algerian National Front: Party leader Moussa Touati claimed "blatant fraud" and announced to contest the result before the constitutional court.

Supranational

- Arab League: Hanafi Wajih, the head of the observer team, said that "the election was free and transparent and the Algerian people have expressed their choice without coercion."
- European Union: Ignacio Salafranca, the head of the EU observer team adjudged the election as "a first step in the reform process which will need to be backed, after a constitutional review, by a deepening of democracy". He criticised that international monitors had been denied access to a national voters' register, which contradicted pledges of transparency. However, he welcomed the overall calm atmosphere in which the elections took place.
- Organisation of Islamic Cooperation: The OIC described the election as "successful and democratic" and praised that they had been held "in an organised, transparent and peaceful manner."

States

- United States: Secretary of State Hillary Clinton hailed the election saying that "the high number of women elected [and the election itself is] a welcome step in Algeria's progress toward democratic reform."

== Aftermath ==
The new parliament's opening session was boycotted by 49 MPs from the Green Algeria Alliance and 11 MPs from two other parties on the grounds that they claimed the election was fraudulent and "a return to the era of single party rule. We decided to withdraw from the first session of the National Assembly and protest officially against the results of the ballot." Lakhdar Benkhelaf of the Islamist Front for Justice and Development, a part of the Political Front for the Safeguard of Democracy, said the boycott was "a question of principle."
