= 1997 Algerian parliamentary election =

- 5 June 1997
- All 380 seats in the People's National Assembly; 191 seats needed for a majority
- Turnout: 65.60% (▲6.60pp)
Party	Leader	Vote %	Seats
RND	Ahmed Ouyahia	33.66	156
MSP	Mahfoud Nahnah	14.80	69
FLN	Boualem Benhamouda	14.26	62
MRI	Abdallah Djaballah	8.70	34
FFS	Hocine Aït Ahmed	5.03	20
RCD	Saïd Sadi	4.21	19
PT	Louisa Hanoune	1.85	4
PRP		0.62	3
UDD		0.49	1
PSL		0.35	1
Independents	–	4.38	11
This lists parties that won seats. See the complete results below.
Results by constituency
Prime Minister before	Prime Minister after
Ahmed Ouyahia; RND	Ahmed Ouyahia; RND

Parliamentary elections were held in Algeria on 5 June 1997. The result was a victory for the National Rally for Democracy (RND), a new party created in early 1997 for President Zéroual's supporters, which won 156 out of 380 seats. They were followed by the Movement of Society for Peace (as Hamas had been required to rename itself) with 69 seats, the National Liberation Front (62), and the Islamist Islamic Renaissance Movement (34). The two Berberist parties, FFS and RCD, got 20 and 19 seats respectively. Views on this election were mixed; most major opposition parties filed complaints, and the success of the extremely new RND raised eyebrows. The RND, FLN, and MSP formed a coalition government, with the RND's Ahmed Ouyahia as prime minister.

Voter turnout was 66%.

== Results ==
Party	Votes	%	Seats
National Rally for Democracy	3,533,434	33.66	156
Movement of Society for Peace	1,553,154	14.80	69
National Liberation Front	1,497,285	14.26	62
Islamic Renaissance Movement	915,446	8.70	34
Socialist Forces Front	527,848	5.03	20
Rally for Culture and Democracy	442,271	4.21	19
National Republican Alliance	208,379	1.99	0
Workers' Party	194,493	1.85	4
Party of Algerian Renewal	197,262	1.88	0
National Movement of Algerian Youth	97,875	0.93	0
Movement of National Understanding	83,939	0.80	0
Algerian Rally	79,554	0.76	0
Progressive Republican Party	65,371	0.62	3
Algerian Movement for Justice and Development	61,829	0.59	0
National Constitutional Rally	55,553	0.53	0
Democratic Youth Movement	54,929	0.52	0
Amal Party	53,621	0.51	0
Union for Democracy and Freedom	51,090	0.49	1
Liberal Social Party	36,374	0.35	1
Algerian Liberal Party			0
Algerian National Rally			0
Algerian Party for Justice and Progress			0
Algerian People's Movement			0
Front of Democratic Algerians			0
Jihad Front for National Unity			0
Liberal Just Party			0
National Alliance of Independent Democrats			0
National Bloc			0
National Boumedienist Front			0
National Movement for Nature and Development			0
National Solidarity and Development Party			0
People's Unity Party			0
Popular Forces' Front			0
Republican Party			0
Social Democratic Party			0
Social Justice Party			0
Social Movement for Authenticity			0
Socialist National Democratic Party			0
Workers' Socialist Party			0
Independents	459,233	4.38	11
Total			380
Valid votes	10,496,352	95.43	
Invalid/blank votes	502,787	4.57	
Total votes	10,999,139	100.00	
Registered voters/turnout	16,767,309	65.60	
Source: Nohlen et al.
