= 2002 Algerian parliamentary election =

- 30 May 2002
- All 389 seats in the People's National Assembly; 195 seats needed for a majority
- Turnout: 46.17% (▼19.43pp)
Party	Leader	Vote %	Seats	+/–
FLN	Abdelaziz Bouteflika	35.28	199	+137
MRN	Abdallah Djaballah	9.50	43	New
RND	Ahmed Ouyahia	8.23	47	−109
MSP	Mahfoud Nahnah	7.05	38	−31
PT	Louisa Hanoune	3.33	21	+17
FNA	Moussa Touati	1.53	8	New
MRI		0.65	1	New
PRA		0.27	1	New
MEN		0.19	1	New
Independents	–	4.93	30	+19
This lists parties that won seats. See the complete results below.
Prime Minister before	Prime Minister after
Ali Benflis; FLN	Ali Benflis; FLN

Parliamentary elections were held in Algeria on 30 May 2002 to elect members of the People's National Assembly. The governing National Liberation Front (FLN) won a majority of seats in the election. The election suffered from a low turnout, violence and boycotts by some opposition parties.

== Candidates ==
The election saw 10,052 candidates standing in the election from 23 political parties. Of the candidates, 694 were female and 1,266 were independents.

== Campaign ==
President Abdelaziz Bouteflika announced the date of the election on 20 February and the official campaign began on 9 May. The President vowed that they would be free elections and warned people against undermining them. However five opposition parties boycotted the election, the Socialist Forces Front (FFS), Rally for Culture and Democracy (RCD), Republican National Alliance (ANR), Movement of Democrats and Socialists (MDS) and the Socialist Workers Party (PST). They claimed that previous elections in 1997 and 1999 were fraudulent and that this election would be no different.

A survey carried out by Al-Watan newspaper showed that 70% would vote for one of the 3 parties in the ruling coalition, the FLN, National Rally for Democracy and the Movement of Society for Peace. The FLN of Prime Minister Ali Benflis campaigned on a platform of unifying the different social groups of Algeria such as by regional development in the south. The RND, which had won the most seats at the last election in 1997, campaigned for economic liberalisation but was undermined by the lack of a base of support or a social ideology. The leader of the RND, Ahmed Ouyahia, warned of the dangers of an Islamist victory but his concerns were dismissed by the interior minister. The opposition Workers' Party led by Louisa Hanoune campaigned against outside interference in Algeria and against privatisation.

The campaign saw widespread apathy with many people seeing the parliament as toothless and the military as remaining the main power. The FLN attempted to raise interest in the election by doing things such as creating a rap song for younger people. However the poll by El Watan showed that over a third planned not to vote and in areas such as Bab el-Oued election billboards were mostly empty. High unemployment, water and housing shortages were also seen as contributing to the apathy in the election.

=== Election day ===
On the day before the election 23 people were killed in Sendjas by the Armed Islamic Group (GIA) in continued violence from the Algerian Civil War. On polling day itself security forces were out in force in Algiers with many roadblocks to prevent terrorist attacks.

In the north eastern Kabylie region a general strike was organised and running battles took place in the regional capital Tizi Ouzou to try to prevent the election from taking place in the region. Throughout much of the area polling stations were deserted and many did not open at all.

== Results ==
The results saw the National Liberation Front win a clear majority of seats. The party won over triple the seats it won at the last election, going from 64 to 199 seats. The RND dropped from 156 seats to 47 in a disastrous result for the party. The moderate Islamist parties suffered a small overall decline in support, with the MSP losing half its seats but the Movement for National Reform made gains and won 43 seats.

Turnout in the election was the lowest yet since independence in 1962. Only 47% of the registered voters turned out to vote, compared to 63% in the 1997 election. 25 women were elected, 18 from the FLN, and after the election the number of women ministers was increased from one to five.

Party	Votes	%	Seats	+/–
National Liberation Front	2,618,003	35.28	199	+137
Movement for National Reform	705,319	9.50	43	New
National Rally for Democracy	610,461	8.23	47	–109
Movement of Society for Peace	523,464	7.05	38	–31
Workers' Party	246,770	3.33	21	+17
Algerian National Front	113,700	1.53	8	New
Islamic Renaissance Movement	48,132	0.65	1	New
Party of Algerian Renewal	19,813	0.27	1	New
Movement of National Understanding	14,465	0.19	1	New
14 other parties	2,155,146	29.04	0	–
Independents	365,594	4.93	30	+19
Total	7,420,867	100.00	389	+9
Valid votes	7,420,867	89.53		
Invalid/blank votes	867,669	10.47		
Total votes	8,288,536	100.00		
Registered voters/turnout	17,951,127	46.17		
Source: IPU
