= Movement of Society for Peace =

Islamic political party in Algeria

Movement of Society for Peace حركة مجتمع السلم
- Leader: Abdelaali Hassani Cherif
- Founded: 6 December 1990
- Headquarters: Algiers, Algiers Province, Algeria
- Ideology: Sunni Islamism; Islamic democracy; Social conservatism; Pan-Islamism; Economic liberalism
- Political position: Right-wing
- National affiliation: Green Algeria Alliance (2012–2017)
- International affiliation: Muslim Brotherhood
- Slogan: Peace is the solution (since 1997); Islam is the solution (until 1997)
- Council of the Nation: 4 / 174
- People's National Assembly: 43 / 407
- People's Provincial Assemblies: 152 / 2,004
- Municipalities: 49 / 1,541
- People's Municipal Assemblies: 1,225 / 24,876

Website
- www.hmsalgeria.net

The Movement of Society for Peace (Arabic: حركة مجتمع السلم, romanized: Harakat Mujtama' as-Silm) is a Sunni Islamist party in Algeria, led by Mahfoud Nahnah until his death in 2003. Its current leader is Abderrazak Makri. It is an offshoot of the Muslim Brotherhood.

== Roots in the Muslim Brotherhood ==
The Muslim Brotherhood reached Algeria during the later years of the French colonial presence in the country (1830–1962). Sheikh Ahmad Sahnoun led the organization in Algeria between 1953 and 1954 during the French colonialism. Brotherhood members and sympathizers took part in the uprising against France in 1954-1962, but the movement was marginalized during the FLN one-party rule which was installed at independence in 1962. Islamic forces however remained active in religious education, mosques and religious associations, including sympathizers of the Muslim Brotherhood. Brotherhood activists generally refrained from confronting the regime, which did not tolerate independent opposition, but sometimes protested the government and generally argued for a greater role for Islam in the country's politics. Muslims also called for increased Arabization of education and the state bureaucracy, and gained a foothold through heavy state backing for the early Arabization programs under Presidents Ahmed Ben Bella and Houari Boumédiène. The reformist-Islamist ideology of the Muslim Brotherhood, in particular, was strengthened through the recruitment of Arabic language teachers from other Arab countries, particularly Egypt, which is the Brotherhood's main stronghold.

== History of the party ==
When a multi-party system was introduced in Algeria in the early 1990s, the Muslim Brotherhood formed the Movement for the Society of Peace (MSP), led by Mahfoud Nahnah until his death in 2003 (he was succeeded by present party leader Boudjerra Soltani). The party was initially known as the Movement for the Islamic Society, but following legal bans on religiously founded parties, the name was changed.

A dissident wing of Brotherhood-inspired Islamists led by Abdallah Djaballah formed their own party, El Nahda, which later split to create El Islah, advocating a more hardline stand towards the government. (Neither is supported by the Muslim Brotherhood's international organization, which recognizes MSP as its Algerian wing.) The Muslim Brotherhood in Algeria did not join the Front islamique du salut (FIS), which emerged as the leading Islamist group in the 1990 local and 1991 parliamentary elections, although the rapidly growing FIS did attract some of its supporters.

In 1992, a military coup d'état cancelled elections which the FIS was on the verge of winning, and banned the organization. The Brotherhood condemned the coup, but refused to join the resulting violent uprising by FIS sympathizers and the Armed Islamic Group (GIA) against the Algerian state and military. Instead, the group urged a peaceful resolution to the conflict and cooperation with the state, which for a time caused some strains with the international Muslim Brotherhood, where many sympathized with the Islamist insurgency.

The MSP thus remained a legal political organization, and ran in all elections organized by the state while the ex-FIS and other rebel forces urged a boycott. In retaliation for the party's pro-government stance, several members were assassinated by extremist militants during the war. Since 1997, the party has been supportive of the presidencies of Liamine Zeroual and Abdelaziz Bouteflika, and has participated in government.

In parliament and government, the party has tried to strengthen conservative and Islamic trends in state and society, e.g. in opposing secularizing changes in the Algerian Family Code. It has argued in favor of amnesty and reconciliation efforts towards former Islamist guerrillas, while simultaneously condemning violence and supporting the state in its confrontation with radical groups still fighting, such as al-Qaida in the Islamic Maghreb (formerly GSPC).

== Electoral participation ==
In the first round of the 1991 parliamentary elections (Algeria's first multi-party elections), the MSP gained 5,3% of the popular vote, becoming the fourth-largest party in parliament. The movement was significantly weaker than the non-Brotherhood FIS, which became the largest party with 47%. The second round of elections were cancelled by a military coup in January 1992, and the FIS was banned.

=== During the civil war ===
The MSP protested the coup, but also clearly condemned the Islamist insurgency that ensued. The party remained committed to the political process, arguing in favor of peaceful reconciliation, an amnesty for Islamist fighters and a return to democracy, while criticizing both sides of the conflict. In 1995, Sheikh Nahnah participated in the presidential elections as main contender against the military-backed winning candidate, Liamine Zeroual. He finished second with 25.38% of the popular vote.

In the 1997 parliamentary elections, the party gained 14.8% of the vote, finishing as the second-largest party in parliament., and subsequently joining the pro-Zeroual governing coalition under leadership of the RND.

=== Presidential alliance under Bouteflika ===
The party would later support Zeroual's successor as president from 1999, Abdelaziz Bouteflika. In the first parliamentary elections under Bouteflika, the MSP received 7% of the vote in the 2002 elections, gaining 38 members in the parliament. In the 2004 presidential elections, the party endorsed and were part of a coalition supporting the reelection of Bouteflika, and it has remained committed to the three-party "presidential coalition" (together with the secular FLN and the RND parties). As part of the presidential coalition, the party has argued for conservative values and the Islamization of society, as well as supported Bouteflika's projects to grant amnesty to former Islamist militants.

In the 2007 parliamentary elections, the MSP again ran as a member of the presidential bloc, earning 10% of the popular vote and becoming the third-largest party of the parliament, with 51 seats. The party further supported constitutional changes in 2008, designed to allow President Bouteflika to run for a third term. Rather than launching its own candidate, it campaigned in favor of Bouteflika's candidacy in the 2009 presidential election.

=== Green Algeria Alliance ===
In 2012, it however turned to founding the Islamist coalition Green Algeria Alliance, together with Islah and Nahda. Jointly participating in the 2012 legislative election, the three Islamist parties had to suffer losses achieving only 6.22% of the popular vote and 49 seats. On 25 January 2014, the MSP announced to boycott the 2014 presidential election.

The party did not participate in the 2019 presidential election. A former member of the party, former Tourism Minister Abdelkader Bengrina, started his own party, the el-Bina, and received 1.5 million votes, or 17.4%, on a turnout of 40%.

== See also ==
- List of Islamic political parties
