= Politics of Algeria =

Politics of Algeria السياسة الجزائرية
- Polity type: Unitary semi‑presidential constitutional republic
- Constitution: Constitution of People's Democratic Republic of Algeria

Legislative branch
- Name: Parliament
- Type: Bicameral
- Meeting place: Nations Palace
- Upper house
- Name: Council of the Nation
- Presiding officer: Azouz Nasri, President of the Council of the Nation
- Appointer: Indirect election
- Lower house
- Name: People's National Assembly
- Presiding officer: Khalida Boufedeche, President of the People's National Assembly
- Appointer: Direct popular vote (two rounds if necessary)

Executive branch
- Head of state
- Title: President
- Currently: Abdelmadjid Tebboune
- Appointer: Direct popular vote (two rounds if necessary)
- Head of government
- Title: Prime Minister
- Currently: Sifi Ghrieb
- Appointer: President
- Cabinet
- Name: Council of Ministers of Algeria
- Current cabinet: Ghrieb government
- Leader: Prime Minister
- Appointer: President of the Republic
- Headquarters: Government Palace

Judicial branch
- Name: Judiciary of Algeria
- Council of State
- Chief judge: Farida Benyahia
- Superior Committee of Justice
- Chief judge: President of the Republic
- Constitutional Court
- Chief judge: Kamel Fenniche
- Supreme Court
- Chief judge: Abdelrrachid Tabbi

Politics of Algeria takes place in a framework of a constitutional semi-presidential republic, whereby the President of Algeria is head of state while the Prime Minister of Algeria is the head of government. Executive power is exercised by the government. Legislative power is vested in both the government and the two chambers of parliament, the People's National Assembly and the Council of the Nation.

Since the early 1990s, a shift from a socialist to a free market economy has been ongoing with official support.

== History ==
The Algerian Civil War resulted in more than 100,000 deaths between 1991 and 2002. Although the security situation in the country has greatly improved, addressing the underlying issues which brought about the political turmoil of the 1990s remains the government's major task. The government officially lifted the state of emergency declared in 1999.

== Constitution ==
Under the 1976 Constitution (as modified 1979, and amended in 1988, 1989, and 1996) Algeria is a multi-party state. All parties must be approved by the Ministry of the Interior. To date, Algeria has had more than 40 legal political parties. According to the Constitution, no political association may be formed if it is "based on differences in religion, language, race, gender, or region."

== Executive branch ==
The head of state is the President of the republic, who is elected to a five-year term, renewable once (changed by the 2008 Constitution to an infinite mandate but reinstated in 2016). Algeria has universal suffrage. The President is the head of the Council of Ministers and of the High Security Council. He appoints the Prime Minister who also is the head of government. The Prime Minister appoints the Council of Ministers.

Main office-holders
Office	Name	Party	Since
President	Abdelmadjid Tebboune	Independent	19 December 2019
Prime Minister	Sifi Ghrieb	Independent	28 August 2025

== Parliament of Algeria ==
=== People's National Assembly ===
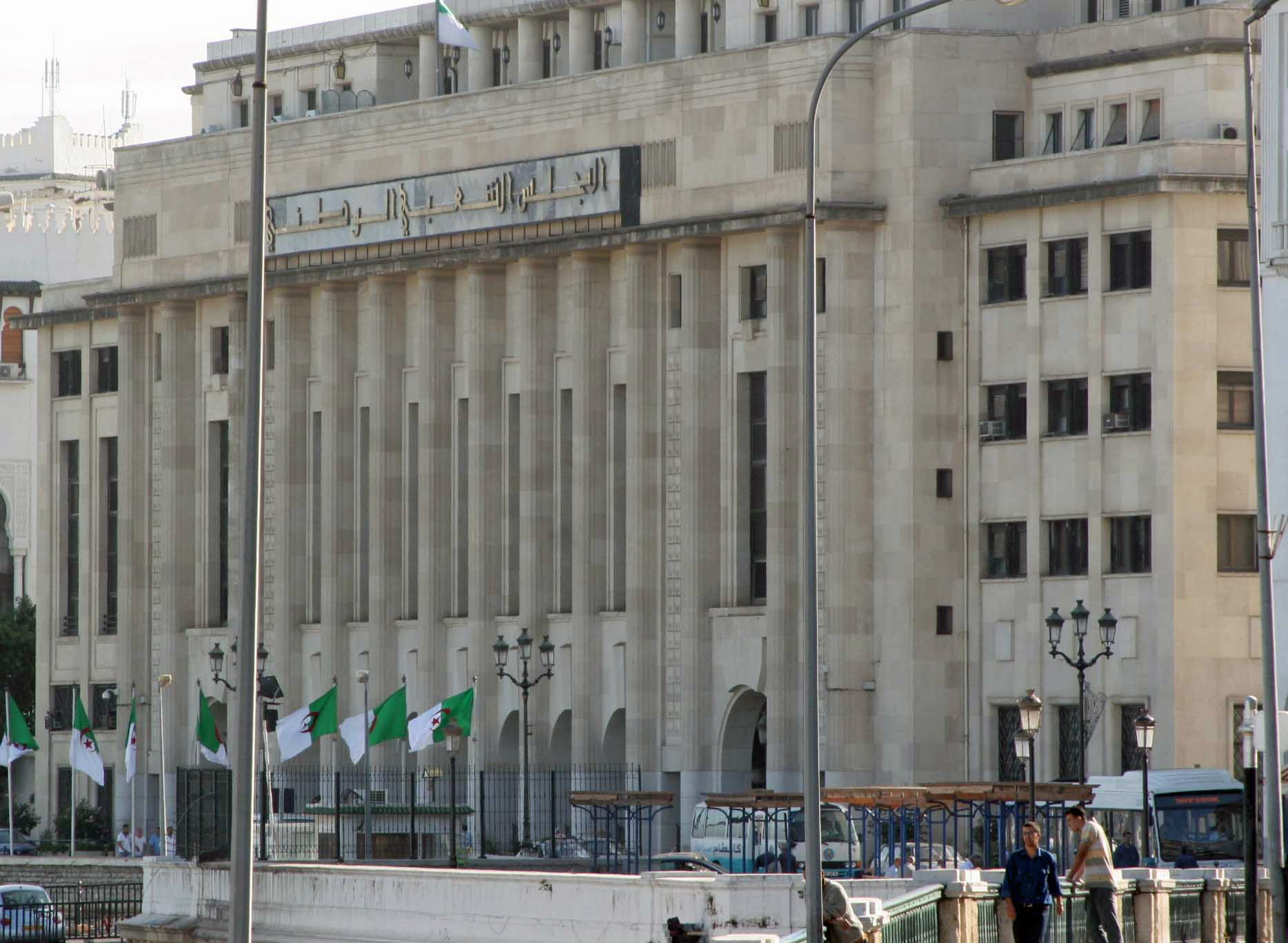
People's National Assembly building (Algiers).

The People's National Assembly has less power relative to the executive branch than many parliaments and has been described as "rubber-stamping" laws proposed by the president.

As of 2012 there were 462 seats in parliament. In the May 2012 election the government reported a 42.9% turnout, though the BBC reported that correspondents saw "only a trickle of voters" at polling places. In that election 44 political parties participated with the ruling National Liberation Front winning more than any other group—220 seats—and an alliance of moderate Islamists coming in second with 66 seats. The Islamists disputed the results.

== Political parties and elections ==
In keeping with its amended Constitution, the Algerian Government espouses participatory democracy and free-market competition. The government has stated that it will continue to open the political process and encourage the creation of political institutions. More than 40 political parties, representing a wide segment of the population, are currently active in Algerian national politics. The most recent legislative election was 2017. President Bouteflika pledged to restructure the state as part of his overall reform efforts. However, no specifics are yet available as to how such reforms would affect political structures and the political process itself.

In the 2002 elections, there were 17,951,127 eligible voters, and 8,288,536 of them actually voted which made a turn out of 46.17%. Out of the ballots cast, there were 867,669 void ballots according to the Interior ministry and 7,420,867 which went to the various candidates.

=== Legislative elections ===
Results of the 2026 legislative elections:

Graph of the party split among 407 seats.
Party	Votes	%	Seats	+/–
National Liberation Front	736,395	17.57	91	–7
Democratic National Rally	641,623	15.31	74	+16
Future Front	523,915	12.50	56	+8
Movement of Society for Peace	431,743	10.30	43	–22
National Construction Movement	376,283	8.98	40	+1
Voice of the People	221,726	5.29	16	+13
Socialist Forces Front	96,111	2.29	12	New
Dignity Party	91,890	2.19	5	+4
New Dawn	80,871	1.93	6	+4
Rally for Hope for Algeria	78,026	1.86	3	+3
Freedom and Justice Party	69,699	1.66	6	+4
Workers' Party	59,991	1.43	3	New
Justice and Development Front	37,583	0.90	4	+2
Renaissance Movement	34,136	0.81	2	+2
Jil Jadid	33,150	0.79	3	+2
New Algeria Front	32,092	0.77	1	–1
Rally for Culture and Democracy	30,510	0.73	4	New
National Republican Alliance	19,723	0.47	1	+1
Good Governance Front	17,876	0.43	1	0
Free Citizens' Front	13,229	0.32	1	+1
Party of Algerian Renewal	10,353	0.25	1	+1
National Unity and Development Party	6,826	0.16	1	+1
Minor independent lists that won seats	238,293	5.69	33	–51
Other parties and independent lists	308,467	7.36	0	–
Total	4,190,511	100.00	407	0
Valid votes	4,190,511	81.17		
Invalid/blank votes	972,319	18.83		
Total votes	5,162,830	100.00		
Registered voters/turnout	24,727,041	20.88		
Source: Official Algerian Journal

=== Presidential elections ===
Results of the 2024 presidential election:

Candidate	Party	Votes	%
Abdelmadjid Tebboune	Independent	7,976,291	84.30
Abdelaali Hassani Cherif	Movement of Society for Peace	904,642	9.56
Youcef Aouchiche	Socialist Forces Front	580,495	6.14
Total		9,461,428	100.00
Valid votes		9,461,428	84.28
Invalid/blank votes		1,764,637	15.72
Total votes		11,226,065	100.00
Registered voters/turnout		24,351,551	46.10
Source: Algeria Press Service

== Administrative divisions ==
Algeria is divided into 69 wilayas (provinces) headed by walis (governors) who report to the Minister of Interior. Each wilaya is further divided into daïras, themselves divided in communes. The wilayas and communes are each governed by an elected assembly.

== Media ==
Algeria has more than 30 daily newspapers published in French and Arabic, with a total publication run of more than 1.5 million copies. Although relatively free to write as they choose, in 2001, the government amended the penal code provisions relating to defamation and slander, a step widely viewed as an effort to rein in the press. Government monopoly of newsprint and advertising is seen as another means to influence the press, although it has permitted newspapers to create their own printing distribution networks.

See also List of Algerian newspapers.

== International organization participation ==
AU, ABEDA, AfDB, AFESD, AL, AMF, AMU, ECA, FAO, G-15, G-20, G-24, G-77, IAEA, IBRD, ICAO, ICFTU, ICRM, IDA, IDB, IFAD, IFC, IFRCS, IHO, ILO, IMF, International Maritime Organization, Inmarsat, Intelsat, Interpol, INTOSAI, IOC, IOM (observer), ISO, ITU, MONUC, NAM, OAPEC, OAS, OIC, OPCW, OPEC, OSCE (partner), UN, UNCTAD, UNESCO, UNHCR, UNIDO, UNWTO, UPU, WCL, WCO, WHO, WIPO, WMO, WTO (applicant)

== See also ==
- 2010–2011 Algerian protests
- Censorship in Algeria
- Ministry of Justice (Algeria)
- Government Palace (Algiers)
- El Mouradia Palace
