= Boudjemaa Haichour =

Algerian politician

Minister of Youth and Sports
- In office September 6, 2003 – April 19, 2004
- Preceded by: Mohamed Allalou
- Succeeded by: Abdulaziz Ziari

Minister of Communications
- In office April 19, 2004 – 2008

Personal details
- Born: بوجمعة هيشور; February 27, 1948 (age 78) Constantine, Algeria

Boudjemaa Haichour (Arabic: بوجمعة هيشور) is a former Algerian politician who served as the Minister of Youth and Sports from 2003 to 2004 and Minister of Communications from 2004 to 2008.

== Biography ==
Hishour was born on February 27, 1948, in Constantine, Algeria. In the 1970s, he served in the National Liberation Front (FLN), after working in the FLN's youth organizations. From 1977 to 1982, he was a deputy in the People's National Assembly. He then served as a senator from 2001 to 2003, where he first entered a ministerial position. From 2003 to 2004, he served as the Minister of Youth and Sports. That year, he attended Amar Ammour's victory ceremony after winning the Ballon d'Or. From 2004 to 2008, he was the Minister of Postal Services, Information, and Communications. Haichour said in 2007 that foreign investment in Algerian telecommunication had reached $5 billion.

Haichour left politics in 2008. In a 2012 op-ed, he called on Algerian people to reject FLN candidates that they disagreed with in the 2012 Algerian parliamentary election amidst the Arab Spring.
