= 1990 Algerian local elections =

Multi-party elections in Algeria

Local elections were held in Algeria on 12 June 1990, the first multi-party elections since independence in 1962. The result was a victory for the Islamic Salvation Front, which won majorities on more than half of the Popular Communal Assemblies and Popular Wilaya Assemblies, receiving around 70% of the vote in Algiers, Constantine and Oran.

The results were considered a decisive defeat for the FLN, which ruled Algeria since its independence in 1962.

== Results ==
=== People's Municipal Assembly ===
Party	Votes	%	Seats	Councils
Islamic Salvation Front	4,331,472	54.2	5,987	856
National Liberation Front	2,245,798	28.1	4,799	486
Rally for Culture and Democracy	166,104	2.1	623	87
National Party for Solidarity and Development	131,100	1.6	134	2
Social Democratic Party	84,029	1.1	65	2
Party of Algerian Renewal	65,450	0.8	61	2
Socialist Vanguard Party	24,190	0.3	10	0
Other parties	5,367	0.0	7	0
Independents	931,278	11.7	1,427	106
Invalid/blank votes	391,972	–	–	–
Total	8,366,760	100	13,113	1,541
Registered voters/turnout	12,841,769	65.2	–	–
Source: Tachau

=== People's Provincial Assembly ===
Party	Votes	%	Seats	Councils
Islamic Salvation Front				31
National Liberation Front				6
Rally for Culture and Democracy				1
Independent				1
No overall control				9
Total				48
Source: Tachau
