= Algerian National Front =

Political party in Algeria

Algerian National Front: Front National Algérien; الجبهة الوطنية الجزائرية
- Leader: Moussa Touati
- Founded: 1990s
- Ideology: National conservatism
- Political position: Right-wing

The Algerian National Front (French: Front National Algérien; Arabic: الجبهة الوطنية الجزائرية, romanized: Jabhah al-Waṭaniyyah al-Jazā'iriyyah) is a right-wing political party in Algeria. The leader of the party is Moussa Touati.

In the elections of 30 May 2002, the party won 1.6% of the popular vote and eight of 380 seats. In the 2007 elections, it won 4.18% of the vote and 13 seats.

== Electoral history ==
=== Presidential elections ===
Election	Party candidate	Votes	%	Result
2009	Moussa Touati	294,411	2.04%	Lost ✗
2014	Moussa Touati	57,590	0.56%	Lost ✗

=== People's National Assembly elections ===
People's National Assembly
Election	Party leader	Votes	%	Seats	+/–
2002	Moussa Touati	113.700	1.60%	8 / 389	▲8
2007	Moussa Touati	239,563	4.18%	13 / 386	▲5
2012	Moussa Touati	198,544	2.60%	9 / 462	▼4
2017	Moussa Touati	615,130	9.51%	0 / 462	▼9
2021	Moussa Touati	1,207	0.03%	1 / 407	▲1
