= Algerian Popular Movement =

Political party in Algeria

Algerian Popular Movement: الحركة الشعبية الجزائرية; Ḥarakat al-Sha'abiyah al-Jazā'iriyy; Mouvement Populaire Algérien Amussu Agdudan Azzayri
- Leader: Amara Benyounès
- Founded: 17 February 2012; 14 years ago
- Headquarters: 53 Coopérative des Médecins - Ben Aknoun, Algiers
- Ideology: Social democracy; Berberism; Secularism; Federalism
- Political position: Centre-left
- Colors: Green; Red; White
- Council of the Nation: 0 / 174
- People's National Assembly: 0 / 407
- People's Provincial Assemblies: 68 / 2,004
- Municipalities: 62 / 1,540
- People's Municipal Assemblies: 1,267 / 24,876

Website
- www.mpa-dz.org

The Algerian Popular Movement (French: Mouvement Populaire Algérien; Berber languages: Amussu Agdudan Azzayri; Arabic: الحركة الشعبية الجزائرية) is a social democratic Berber political party in Algeria. The party, which had been previously known since 2003 as the Union for Democracy and the Republic (UDR, Union pour la Démocratie et la République), was re-founded in February 2012. In the 17 May 2012 People's National Assembly elections, the party won 2.17% of the vote and 7 of the 389 seats.
