= Union for Democracy and Freedom =

The Union for Democracy and Freedom (French: Union pour la Démocratie et les Libertés, UDL) was a political party in Algeria.

== History ==
The UDL was established in 1989, and ran in the first multi-party elections since independence in 1991, receiving just 0.1% of the vote and failing to win a seat. The 1997 elections saw the party increase its vote share to 0.5%, winning a single seat in the People's National Assembly.

The party lost its seat in the 2002 elections. It supported President Abdelaziz Bouteflika in the 2004 presidential elections, before ceasing to function in 2005.
