= 1988 Algerian constitutional referendum =

3 November 1988

Results
Choice	Votes	%
Yes	9,341,429	92.29%
No	780,677	7.71%
Valid votes	10,122,106	97.00%
Invalid or blank votes	312,940	3.00%
Total votes	10,435,046	100.00%
Registered voters/turnout	12,572,043	83%

A constitutional referendum was held in Algeria on 3 November 1988. The changes were put forward by the government, and constituted amendments to fourteen articles (intended to reduce the power of the ruling party, the National Liberation Front). However, the changes were opposed by opposition leaders, who claimed the changes needed to go further in the direction of political pluralism, and called on the public to boycott the vote. Nevertheless, the amendments were approved by 92% voters with an 83% turnout.

== Results ==
Choice	Votes	%
For	9,341,429	92.29
Against	780,677	7.71
Total	10,122,106	100.00
Valid votes	10,122,106	97.00
Invalid/blank votes	312,940	3.00
Total votes	10,435,046	100.00
Registered voters/turnout	12,572,043	83.00
Source: Direct Democracy
