= National Movement =

National Movement may mean:

- Movimiento Nacional, the Francoist political structure in Spain
- National Movement (Georgia), a center-right opposition party in the country of Georgia
- National Movement (Luxembourg), a defunct neo-fascist political party in Luxembourg
- National Movement (Poland), a Polish far-right wing party
- National Movement of Hope, a minor political party in Algeria
- People's National Movement, a liberal political party in Trinidad and Tobago
  - Tobago Council of the People's National Movement, the Tobagonian branch of the party
- Progressive National Movement, a progressive political party in Colombia
- National Movement of Afghanistan, a political party in Afghanistan
- Basej-e Milli (National Movement), a political party in Afghanistan
- United National Movement (Georgia), a political party in Georgia
- United National Movement (Pakistan) (Muttahida Qaumi Movement), a political party in Pakistan
- United National Movement (Saint Kitts-Nevis-Anguilla), a political party in St Kitts and Nevis
- National Movement (Colombia), a conservative political party in Colombia
- Baloch National Movement, a Baloch nationalist political organization
- IMRO – Bulgarian National Movement
- National Movement for Stability and Progress
- Herut – The National Movement, an Israeli political party
- National Movement of the Jewish people, a Jewish movement also known as Zionism
- National Movement for the Development of Society
- National Movement for the Salvation of the Fatherland, a nationalist political party in Bulgaria
- Turkish National Movement, encompassing the political and military activities of the Turkish revolutionaries
- National Movement for Reconciliation, a political party in Colombia
- Union for the Republic – National Movement, a political party of the Democratic Republic of Congo
- National Movement for Nature and Development, a minor Green political party in Algeria.
- National Socialist Movement (disambiguation), a name used by a number of neo-Nazi organizations
- Mouvement National Congolais, a political party in the Democratic Republic of the Congo
- National Movement for the Liberation of Kosovo, a radical left-wing nationalist political movement
- National Social Movement (Bulgaria)
- National Movement for Sovereignty, a political party in Italy
