= 1987 Algerian parliamentary election =

← 1982	26 February 1987	1991 →

All 295 seats in the People's National Assembly 148 seats needed for a majority
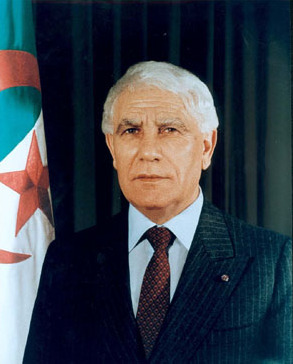
	First party
Leader	Chadli Bendjedid
Party	FLN
Last election	282
Seats won	295
Seat change	▲13
Popular vote	9,910,631
Percentage	100%
Prime Minister before election
Abdelhamid Brahimi
RND
Elected Prime Minister
Abdelhamid Brahimi
RND

Parliamentary elections were held in Algeria on 26 February 1987. The country was a one-party state at the time, with the National Liberation Front (FLN) as the sole legal party. The FLN nominated 885 candidates for the 295 seats, with voters asked to express their preference by crossing out names on the ballot. Only 67 of the 132 incumbents who ran for re-election were successful.

Voter turnout was 87%.

== Results ==
Party	Votes	%	Seats	+/–
National Liberation Front			295	+13
Total			295	+13
Total votes	9,910,631	–		
Registered voters/turnout	11,328,680	87.48		
Source: IPU
