= Liberal Social Party =

Political party in Algeria

The Liberal Social Party (French: Parti Social Libéral, PSL) was a political party in Algeria.

== History ==
The PSL ran in the first multi-party elections since independence in 1991, receiving just 0.1% of the vote and failing to win a seat. The 1997 elections saw the party increase its vote share to 0.4%, winning a single seat in the People's National Assembly. However, the party was banned in 1998 after a court ruled that it had broken electoral laws.
