= Movement for Youth and Democracy =

Political party in Algeria

The Movement for Youth and Democracy (Mouvement pour la Jeunesse et la Démocratie) is a minor political party in Algeria. In the 17 May 2007 People's National Assembly elections, the party won 2.31% of the vote and 5 out of 389 seats.
