= High Council of Youth (Algeria) =

High Council of Youth

High Council of Youth (algeria)
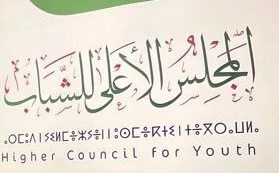
- Founder: Abdelmadjid Tebboune
- Headquarters: Q393+XVV, Mohamed 5 Blvd, El Djazair 16000
- President: Mustapha Hidaoui
- Website: https://csj.gov.dz/

The Higher Council for Youth (Algeria) is an advisory body to the President of the Republic of Algeria. It enjoys legal personality and financial independence. The council provides opinions, recommendations, and proposals on matters related to the needs and well-being of youth in the economic, social, cultural, and sports sectors.

The Higher Council for Youth was established by Presidential Decree No. 21-416 on October 27, 2021, which outlines the duties and composition of the council. It serves as an advisory body under the Presidency of the Republic, with autonomy in both financial and legal matters.

== See also ==
- Parliament of Algeria
- Council of the Nation
- Politics of Algeria
- List of legislatures by country
