= 2007 Algerian parliamentary election =

- 17 May 2007
- All 389 seats in the People's National Assembly; 195 seats needed for a majority
- Turnout: 35.67% (▼10.50pp)
Party	Leader	Vote %	Seats	+/–
FLN	Abdelaziz Belkhadem	22.95	136	−63
RND	Ahmed Ouyahia	10.44	62	+15
MSP	Boudjerra Soltani	9.71	51	+13
PT	Louisa Hanoune	5.09	26	+5
FNA	Moussa Touati	4.22	13	+5
MRI		3.39	5	+4
RCD	Saïd Sadi	3.24	19	+19
El-Infitah		2.63	3	+3
MRN		2.56	3	−40
MJD		2.29	5	+5
Ahd 54	Ali Fawzi Rebaine	2.27	2	+2
ANR		2.20	4	+4
MEN		2.13	4	+3
MNND		2.00	7	+7
PNSD		1.99	2	+2
FNIC		1.96	3	+3
PRA		1.80	4	+3
RA		1.75	1	+1
MNE		1.72	2	+2
RPR		1.48	2	+2
PRP		1.39	0	0
FND		1.37	1	+1
MDS		0.89	1	+1
Independents	–	9.85	33	+3
This lists parties that won seats. See the complete results below.
Prime Minister before	Prime Minister after
Abdelaziz Belkhadem; FLN	Abdelaziz Belkhadem; FLN

Parliamentary elections were held in Algeria on 17 May 2007. 24 political parties and around 100 independent lists with a total of more than 12,000 candidates competed for the 389 seats in the National People's Assembly. While most Algerians voted on May 17, immigrants from Algeria to other countries (especially France) and Algerians living in the Sahara (i.e. Southern Algeria) and other nomads and semi-nomads voted on May 16 due to the distance from Algiers, the country's capital.

At 36% of the 18.8 million voters, turnout was the lowest in Algerian history. Several political organisations, notably the Socialist Forces Front, the ex-communist Democratic and Social Movement, leading members of the former Islamic Salvation Front (Abbassi Madani and Ali Belhadj), the main faction of the split Islamist Islah Party, and the newly formed organisation Rachad, had called on their supporters to boycott these elections. These political groups claimed that the elections were consistently rigged by the government, and that participation merely lent a fundamentally corrupt process undeserved legitimacy.

The only notable remaining armed group in Algeria, the Al-Qaeda Organization in the Islamic Maghreb, issued a video calling participation in the elections "a great sin", adding its voice to the boycott calls. Tight security measures were implemented to protect the elections; however, two bombs exploded in Constantine the day before the election, killing a police officer and wounding five others.

Said Bouchair, the head of the national commission of legislative election control, initially reported that ballot boxes in some areas were being stuffed with FLN ballots, that observers were being prevented from attending, and that some areas refused to open ballot boxes before voting began to allow observers to see whether they were empty or not. He then retracted his statement and apologised. About 15% of ballots were spoiled.

The Constitutional Council confirmed the results of the election, with slight changes to the voter turn-out rate and number of seats won by some parties, on May 21. It rejected appeals regarding the election on May 30.

== Results ==
Women won 31 seats, which was an increase of eight.

Party	Votes	%	Seats	+/–
National Liberation Front	1,314,494	22.95	136	–63
National Rally for Democracy	597,712	10.44	62	+15
Movement of Society for Peace	556,401	9.71	51	+13
Workers' Party	291,395	5.09	26	+5
Algerian National Front	241,594	4.22	13	+5
Islamic Renaissance Movement	193,908	3.39	5	+4
Rally for Culture and Democracy	185,616	3.24	19	+19
El-Infitah Movement	150,423	2.63	3	+3
Movement for National Reform	146,528	2.56	3	–40
Movement for Youth and Democracy	130,992	2.29	5	+5
Ahd 54	129,865	2.27	2	+2
National Republican Alliance	125,862	2.20	4	+4
Movement of National Understanding	121,961	2.13	4	+3
National Movement for Nature and Democracy	115,075	2.01	7	+7
National Party for Solidarity and Development	114,247	1.99	2	+2
National Front of Independents for Understanding	112,263	1.96	3	+3
Party of Algerian Renewal	103,356	1.80	4	+3
Algerian Rally	100,391	1.75	1	+1
National Movement of Hope	98,604	1.72	2	+2
Republican Patriotic Rally	84,497	1.48	2	+2
Progressive Republican Party	79,452	1.39	0	0
National Democratic Front	78,596	1.37	1	+1
Democratic and Social Movement	50,879	0.89	1	+1
Socialist Workers Party	39,547	0.69	0	0
Independents	564,169	9.85	33	+3
Total	5,727,827	100.00	389	+73
Valid votes	5,727,827	85.58		
Invalid/blank votes	965,064	14.42		
Total votes	6,692,891	100.00		
Registered voters/turnout	18,761,084	35.67		
Source: Official Journal
