= 1977 Algerian parliamentary election =

- 25 February 1977
- All 261 seats in the People's National Assembly; 131 seats needed for a majority
- Turnout: 75.85%
Party	Leader	Seats	+/–
National Liberation Front	Houari Boumediene	261	+123
This lists parties that won seats. See the complete results below.

Parliamentary elections were held in Algeria on 25 February 1977 to elect members to the new People's National Assembly. They were the first parliamentary elections since 1964, as the previous National Assembly had been dissolved in 1965, and were held as a result of the country's new constitution and electoral law being promulgated the year before.

The new Assembly had 261 members, elected from 160 constituencies (daira). Constituencies with less than 80,000 inhabitants had one representative; constituencies with more than 80,000 residents had one extra representative for every 20,000 inhabitants over 80,000.

As the country was a one-party state at the time, the National Liberation Front was the only party to run in the election. It put forward 783 candidates (of which 39 were women), and claimed all 261 seats (nine of which went to female candidates). Voter turnout was 76%.

== Results ==
Party	Votes	%	Seats
National Liberation Front			261
Total			261
Total votes	6,037,537	–	
Registered voters/turnout	7,960,000	75.85	
Source: IPU
