= National Party for Solidarity and Development =

Political party in Algeria

- Leader: Rabah Bencherif; Dalila Yalaqui
- Founded: 1989

The National Party for Solidarity and Development (Parti National pour la Solidarité et le Developpement; PNSD) is a minor political party in Algeria.

== History and profile ==
The National Party for Solidarity and Development was established in 1989. Rabah Bencherif was the leader of the party. The current leader is Dalila Yalaqui.

In the 17 May 2007 People's National Assembly elections, the party won 2.08% of the vote and 2 out of 389 seats. It also won four seats in the 2012 elections.
