= Green Algeria Alliance =

Green Algeria Alliance Alliance de l'Algérie verte تكتل الجزائر الخضراء
- Leader: Bouguerra Soltani
- Founded: 7 March 2012
- Dissolved: 2017
- Ideology: Islamism; Islamic democracy
- International affiliation: Muslim Brotherhood
- Member parties: MSP; Ennahda; MRN
- Colours: Green; Red

Website
- msilakhadraa.wordpress.com

The Green Algeria Alliance (French: Alliance de l'Algérie verte; Arabic: تكتل الجزائر الخضراء), short Green Alliance was an Islamist coalition of political parties, created on 7 March 2012 for the Algerian legislative election, 2012. It consisted of the Movement of Society for Peace (Hamas), Islamic Renaissance Movement (Ennahda) and the Movement for National Reform (Islah). The alliance was led by Bouguerra Soltani of the Hamas.

The alliance was dissolved in 2017.
