= Social Democratic Party (Algeria) =

Political party in Algeria

The Social Democratic Party (French: Parti Social-Democrate, PSD) was a political party in Algeria.

== History ==
The party was established on 2 March 1989 and applied for registration on 19 July, becoming the first party registered under Law 89–11 and the first legal opposition party for over 20 years. Its founders were from two main groups, one of lawyers and private sector workers, and the other of intellectuals supportive of social democracy. In March 1990 internal tensions led to the party splitting into two factions, PSD-I and PSD-II. Together the factions received 1.1% of the vote in the 1990 local elections, winning 65 seats and gaining control of two Popular Communal Assemblies. Under pressure from the Ministry of the Interior, the two factions were reunited after a meeting in January 1991.

In the 1991 parliamentary elections, the PSD received 0.4% of the vote, failing to win a seat, although the results were later annulled. It also failed to win a seat in the 1997 parliamentary elections.
