= Socialist Workers Party (Algeria) =

Political party in Algeria

Socialist Workers Party Parti socialiste des travailleurs حزب العمال الاشتراكي
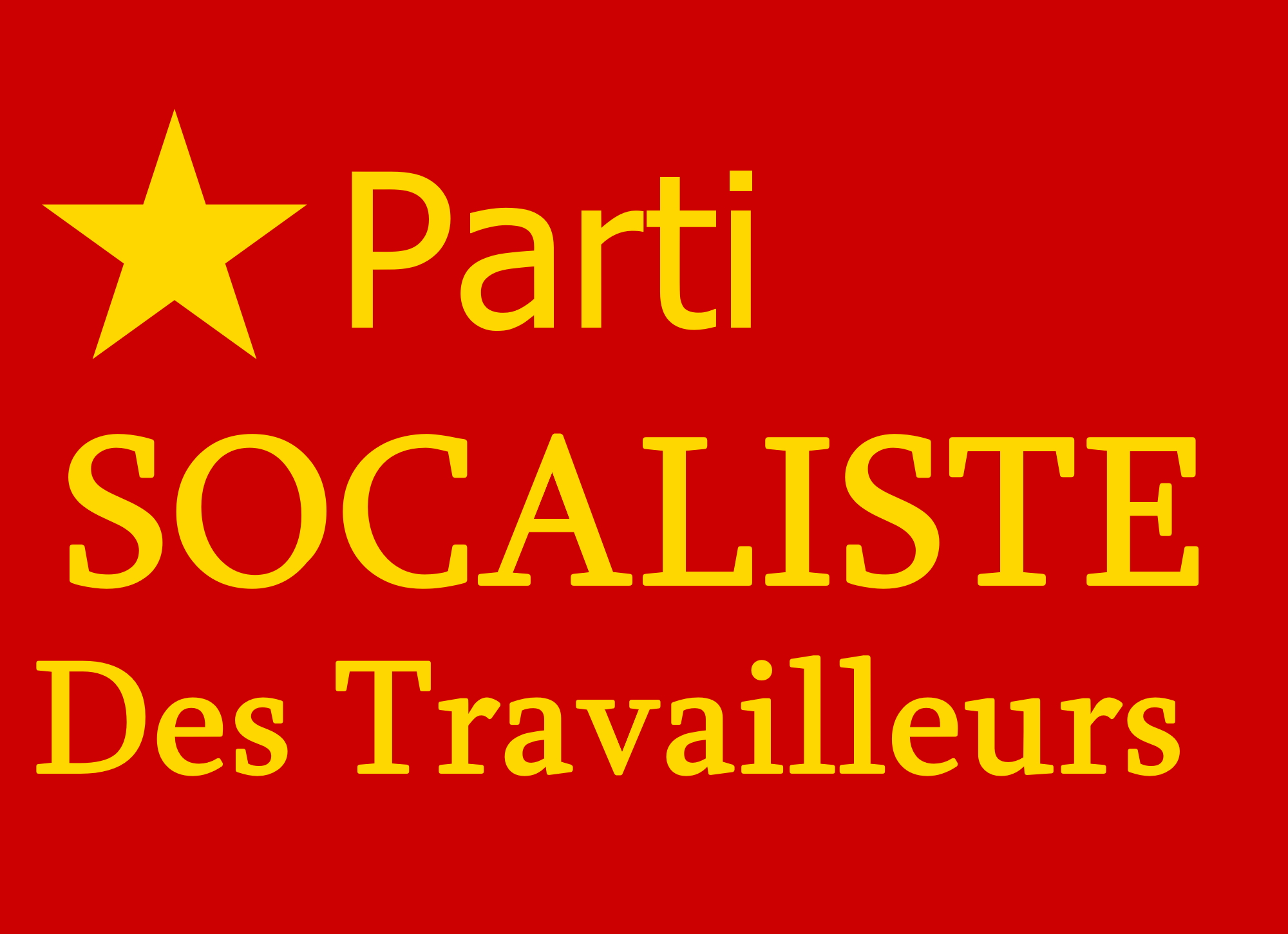
- Founded: 1989
- Preceded by: Revolutionary Communist Group
- Newspaper: El Khatwa
- Ideology: Internationalism; Marxism; Trotskyism; Socialism; Communism; Feminism
- Political position: Far-left
- National affiliation: Forces of the Democratic Alternative
- International affiliation: Fourth International
- Council of the Nation: 0 / 174
- People's National Assembly: 0 / 407
- People's Provincial Assemblies: 0 / 1,976
- Municipalities: 1 / 1,540

Website
- pst-algerie.org

The Socialist Workers' Party (French: Parti socialiste des travailleurs, PST; Arabic: حزب العمال الاشتراكي, romanized: hizb aleummal alaishtirakii; Kabyle: Akabar Anemlay n Yixeddamen) is an Algerian political party. Founded in 1989 by the Revolutionary Communist Group, itself established by a group of Trotskyist students in 1974, the PST remains affiliated with Fourth International, a Trotskyist international.

In the 2007 Algerian parliamentary election, the PST won 0.75% of the vote, meaning it did not receive any of the 389 seats available.

== History ==
In 2019, the PST joined the Forces of the Democratic Alternative (FDA), a secular alliance of political and civil opposition during the pro-democracy Hirak movement. As part of the FDA, it boycotted the 2021 Algerian parliamentary elections, which subsequently had the lowest turnout of an Algerian election, at 22.99%.

In January 2022, the Council of State order the freezing of all PST activities, as well as the closure of its headquarters, following a complaint filed by the Ministry of the Interior. The PST denounced this as "a blatant attack on partisan pluralism and democratic freedoms in Algeria".
