= National Movement of Hope =

Political party in Algeria

The National Movement of Hope (Mouvement National d'Esperance) is a minor political party in Algeria. In the 17 May 2007 People's National Assembly elections, the party won 1.73% of the vote and 2 out of 389 seats. It also won two seats in the 2012 elections.
