= National Democratic Front (Algeria) =

Political party in Algeria

The National Democratic Front (Front National Démocratique) is a minor political party in Algeria. In the 17 May 2007 People's National Assembly elections, the party won 1.38% of the vote and 1 out of 389 seats.
