= Algerian Rally =

Political party in Algeria

The Algerian Rally (Arabic: التجمع الجزائري, French: Rassemblement algérien) is a minor political party in Algeria, led by Ali Zaghdoud. In the 17 May 2007 People's National Assembly elections, the party won 1.75% of the vote and one out of 389 seats. It also won two seats in the 2012 elections.
