= National Front of Independents for Understanding =

Political party in Algeria

The National Front of Independents for Understanding is a minor political party in Algeria. In the 17 May 2007 People's National Assembly elections, the party won 1.96% of the vote and 3 out of 389 seats.
