= El-Infitah Movement =

Political party in Algeria

- Leader: Naima Farhi
- Founded: 1997

The El-Infitah Movement (French: Mouvement El Infitah; Arabic: حركة الإنفتاح; lit. 'Opening Movement') is a minor political party in Algeria, led by Naima Farhi.

== History and profile ==
The party was established as the Algerian National Youth Movement in 1997. It was renamed as El Infitah before the 2007 elections. It has a nationalist and progressive political leaning. Its president is Omar Bouacha and the secretary general is Naima Farhi.

In the 17 May 2007 People's National Assembly elections, the party won 3 out of 389 seats.
