= National Liberation Front (Algeria) =

Political party in Algeria

National Liberation Front جبهة التحرير الوطني
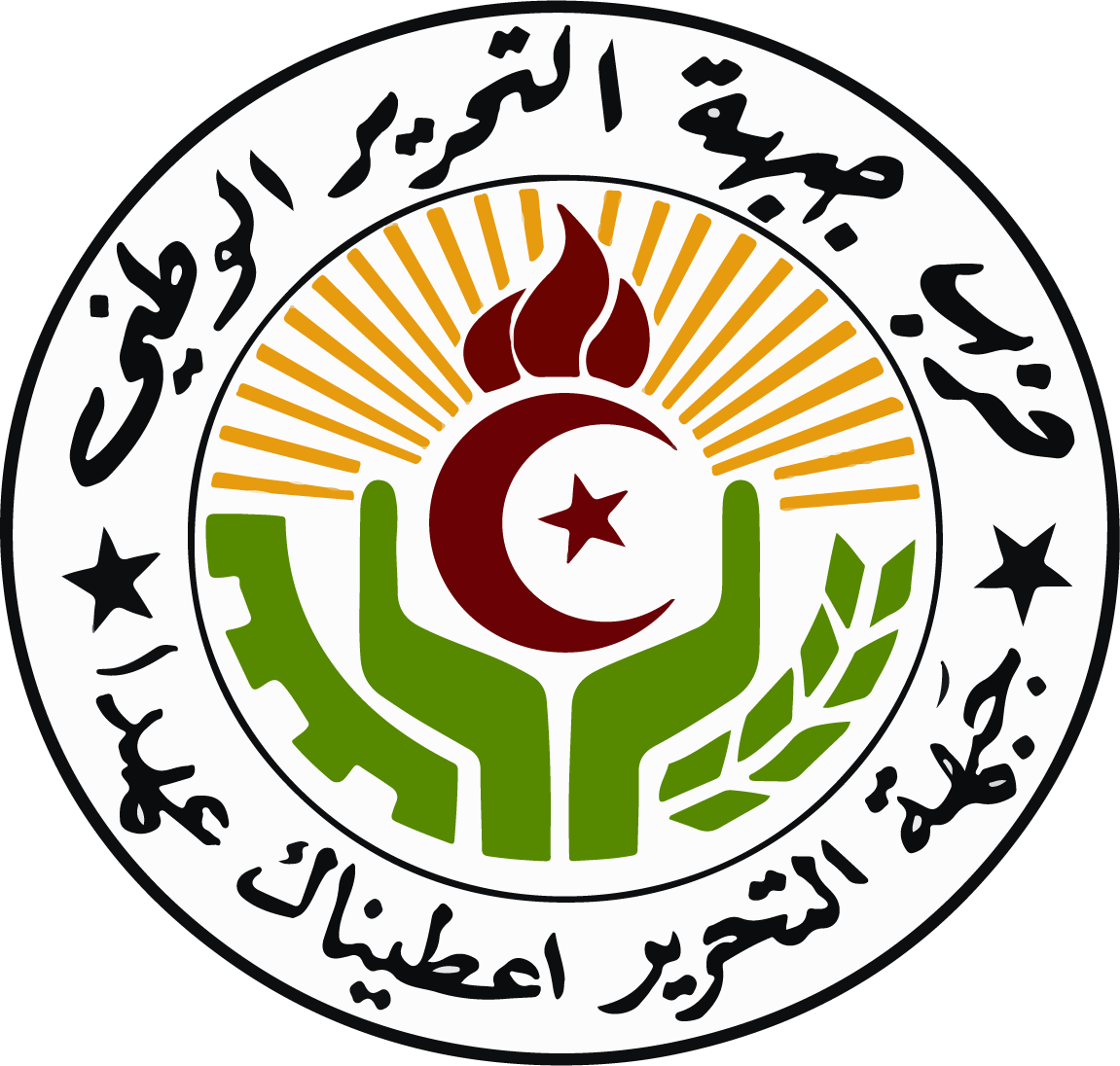
- Abbreviation: FLN
- Secretary-General: Abdelkrim Benmbarek
- Founded: 23 October 1954 (72 years, 12 days ago)
- Preceded by: CRUA
- Headquarters: Algiers
- Newspaper: El Moudjahid
- Armed wing: National Liberation Army (1954–1962)
- Membership (2019): ▲1,000,000
- Ideology: Algerian nationalism; Arab nationalism; Pan-Arabism; Arab socialism; Social democracy; Democratic socialism; Economic liberalism; Anti-imperialism; Historical: Nasserism; Revolutionary socialism; Vanguardism
- Political position: Centre-left; Historical: Left-wing to far-left
- Regional affiliation: PSOM (historical)
- International affiliation: For the Freedom of Nations! (since 2024); Socialist International (until 2019)
- Colors: Red; Green; White
- Council of the Nation: 41 / 174
- People's National Assembly: 91 / 407
- People's Provincial Assemblies: 711 / 2,004
- Municipalities: 603 / 1,540
- People's Municipal Assemblies: 7,603 / 24,876

Party flag

Website
- fln.dz

The National Liberation Front (Arabic: جبهة التحرير الوطني, romanized: Jabhat at-Taḥrīr al-Waṭanī; French: Front de libération nationale), commonly known by its French acronym FLN, (Note: Arabic: ج ت و, romanized: JTW) is a nationalist political party in Algeria ruling since the country's independence in 1962. It was the main nationalist movement during the Algerian War and the sole legal and ruling political party of the Algerian state until other parties were legalised in 1989.

The FLN was established in 1954 following a split in the Movement for the Triumph of Democratic Liberties from members of the Special Organisation paramilitary; its armed wing, the National Liberation Army, participated in the Algerian War from 1954 to 1962. After the Évian Accords of 1962, the party purged internal dissent and ruled Algeria as a one-party state. After the 1988 October Riots and the Algerian Civil War (1991–2002) against Islamist groups, the FLN was reelected to power in the 2002 Algerian legislative election, and has generally remained in power until 2007, when it started forming coalitions with other parties.

== History ==
=== Colonial era ===
The background of the FLN can be traced back to the growing anti-colonialism and Algerian nationalist sentiments since the outbreak of WWII. The repression against the Algerian Muslim population intensified as Abdelhamid Ben Badis was placed under house arrest and Marshal Pétain's government banned the Algerian Communist Party and Algerian People's Party. As the war turned gradually more in favor of the Western Allies, given the US's global engagement and its ideological campaign against colonialism, the core sentiment amongst the Algerian nationalists was to use the victory in Europe to promote the independence of the country, which is reflected by the issuing of the Manifesto of the Algerian People by Ferhat Abbas. As this objective failed to materialize, a new party Movement for the Triumph of Democratic Liberties (MTDL) founded by the just-released Messali Hadj started to gain momentum and took the lead in the nationalist movement.

However, the Algerian Assembly's double electoral college system stipulated an equal number of 60 representation between the French settlers and the Muslim community while the Muslim community was significantly larger than the settlers. The underrepresentation combined with the unfair election in 1948 limited the MTDL's ability to gain further political power. Consequently, the Algerian nationalists veered to a more military approach as noted in their participation in the Special Organisation, which was a paramilitary component of the MTLD and included important figures in Algerian politics such as Ahmed Ben Bella, Hocine Aït Ahmed, and Mohammed Boudiaf.

Later in 1951, the capture of Ahmed Ben Bella and the subsequent dismantling of the Special Organisation temporarily subdued the nationalist movement but sparked a desire in the Special Organisation militants to form a new organization – the Revolutionary Committee of Unity and Action (CRUA). It initially had a five-man leadership consisting of Mostefa Ben Boulaïd, Larbi Ben M'hidi, Rabah Bitat, Mohamed Boudiaf and Mourad Didouche. They were joined by Krim Belkacem in August, and Hocine Aït Ahmed, Ahmed Ben Bella and Mohamed Khider later in the summer.

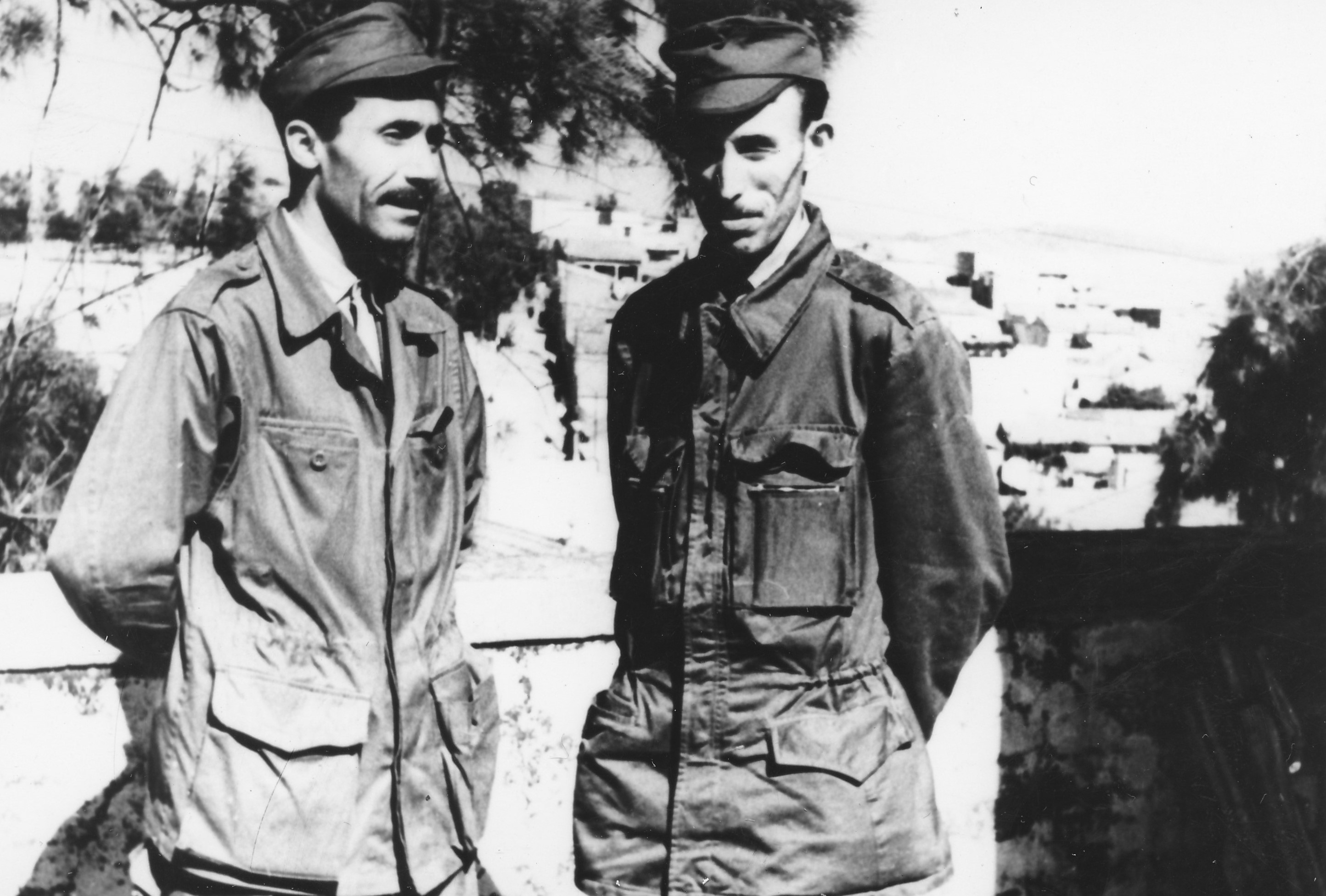
Houari Boumediène (right), the leader of the National Liberation Army and future President of Algeria, during the war

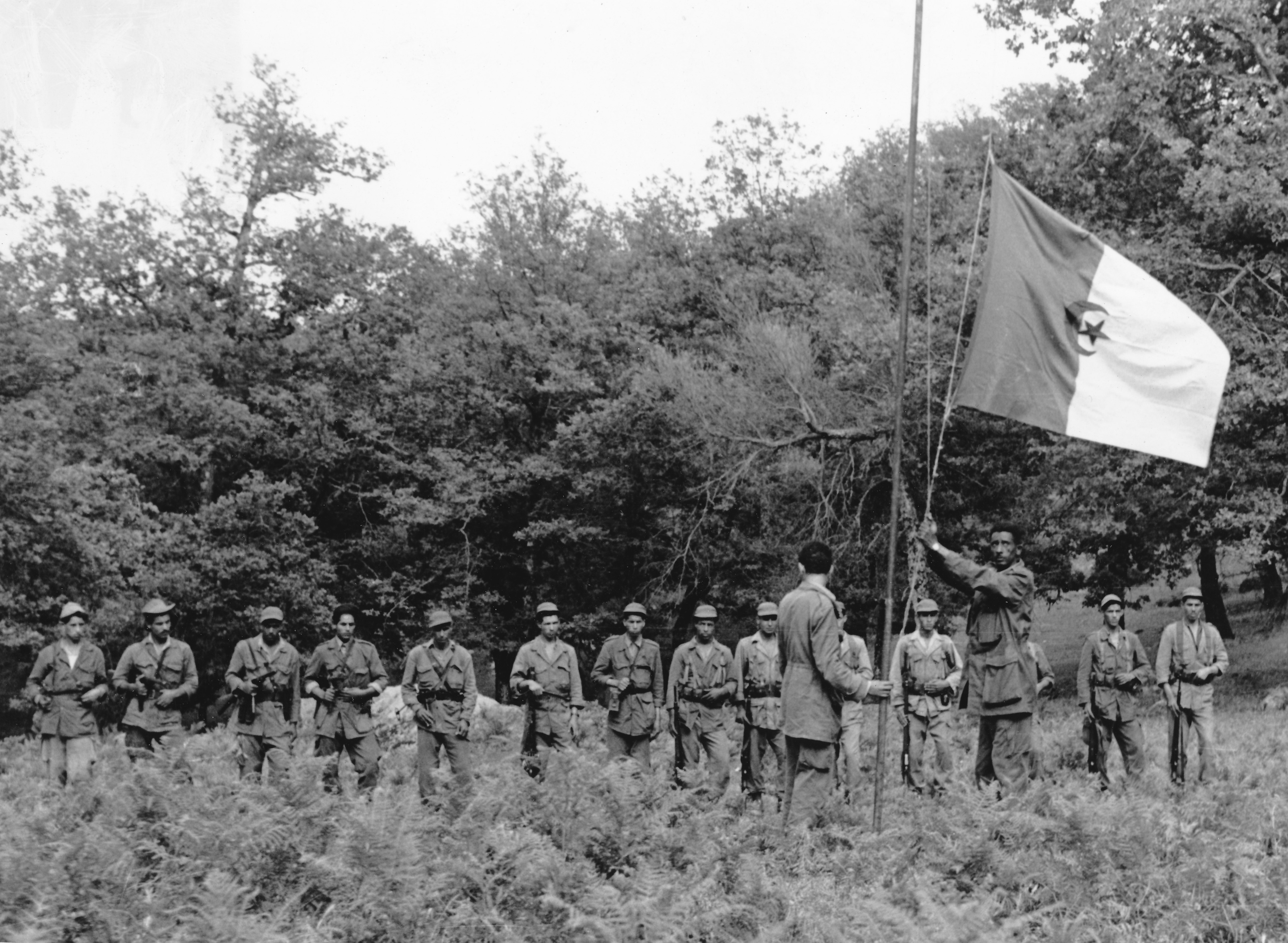
National Liberation Army soldiers next to the Algerian flag

The FLN was established on 10 October 1954. It succeeded the CRUA which had been formed earlier in the year because the CRUA failed to provide unity within the MTLD Party. On 1 November 1954, the FLN launched the Algerian War after publishing the Declaration of 1 November 1954 written by journalist Mohamed Aïchaoui. Didouche was killed on 18 January 1955, whilst both Ben Boulaïd and Bitat were captured by the French. Abane Ramdane was recruited to take control of the FLN's Algiers campaign, and went on to become one of its most effective leaders. By 1956, nearly all the nationalist organizations in Algeria had joined the FLN, which had established itself as the main nationalist group by co-opting and coercing smaller organizations; the most important group that remained outside the FLN was Messali Hadj's Algerian National Movement (MNA). At this time the FLN reorganized into something like a provisional government, consisting of a five-man executive and legislative body, and was organized territorially into six wilayas, following the Ottoman-era administrative boundaries.

The FLN's armed wing during the war was called the National Liberation Army (ALN). It was divided into guerrilla units fighting France and the MNA in Algeria (and wrestling with Messali's followers over control of the expatriate community, in the "Café Wars" in France), and another, stronger component more resembling a traditional army. These units were based in neighbouring Arab countries (notably in Oujda in Morocco, and Tunisia), and although they infiltrated forces and ran weapons and supplies across the border, they generally saw less action than the rural guerrilla forces. These units were later to emerge under the leadership of army commander Colonel Houari Boumediene as a powerful opposition to the political cadres of the FLN's exile government, the GPRA, and they eventually came to dominate Algerian politics.

==== FLN violence ====
The Algerian war resulted in between 300,000 and 1.5 million deaths. The FLN is considered responsible for over 16,000 civilians killed and over 13,000 disappeared between 1954 and 1962. After the ceasefire of 19 March 1962, the FLN is thought to have massacred thousands of harkis, Muslim Algerians who had served in the French army and whom the French, contrary to promises given, had denied a "repatriation" to France. An example of an FLN massacre is the Philippeville massacre.

=== Independence and one-party state ===
The war for independence continued until March 1962, when the French government finally signed the Évian Accords, a ceasefire agreement with the FLN. In July of the same year, the Algerian people approved the cease-fire agreement with France in a referendum, supporting economic and social cooperation between the two countries as well. Full independence followed, and the FLN seized control of the country. Political opposition in the form of the MNA and Communist organizations was outlawed, and Algeria was constituted as a one-party state. The FLN became its only legal and ruling party.

Immediately after independence, the party experienced a severe internal power struggle. Political leaders coalesced into two large camps: a Political Bureau formed by the radical Ahmed Ben Bella, who was assisted by the border army, faced off against the political leadership in the former exile government; Boumédiène's army quickly put down resistance and installed Ben Bella as president. The single most powerful political constituency remained the former ALN, which had returned largely unscathed from exile and was now organized as the country's armed forces; added to this were regionally powerful guerrilla irregulars and others who jockeyed for influence in the party. In building his one-party regime, Ben Bella purged remaining dissidents (such as Ferhat Abbas), but also quickly ran into opposition from Boumédiène as he tried to assert himself independently from the army.

In 1965, the tension between Boumédiène and Ben Bella culminated in a coup d'état, after Ben Bella had tried to sack one of the Colonel's closest collaborators, Foreign Minister Abdelaziz Bouteflika (who was elected President of Algeria in 1999). A statist-socialist and anticolonial nationalist, Boumédiène ruled through decree and "revolutionary legitimacy", marginalizing the FLN in favor of his personal decision-making and the military establishment, even while retaining the one-party system. Boumédiène held tight control over party leadership until his death in 1978, at which time the party reorganized again under the leadership of the military's next candidate, Col. Chadli Bendjedid. The military remained well-represented on the FLN Central Committee and is widely thought to have been the real power-broker in the country. During the 1980s the FLN toned down the socialist content of its programme, enacting some free-market reforms and purging Boumédiène stalwarts.

=== Multi-party era ===
Logo used until 2022

It was not until 1988 that massive demonstrations and riots jolted the country towards major political reform. The riots led to the constitution being amended to allow a multi-party system. The first multi-party elections were the 1990 local elections, which saw the FLN heavily defeated by the Islamist Islamic Salvation Front (ISF), which won control of more than half the local councils; the FLN received just over a quarter of the vote, retaining control of a similar number of councils. The first round of the parliamentary elections the following year saw the ISF win 188 of the 231 seats, whilst the FLN won only 16, placing third behind the Socialist Forces Front. However, shortly afterwards, due to fears of the ISF forming an Islamic state, a military coup d'état cancelled the election process and forced president Bendjedid to resign, sparking the Algerian Civil War.

Algeria was under direct military rule for several years, during which the party remained in opposition to the government during the first part of the war, notably in 1995 signing the Sant'Egidio Platform, which was highly critical of the military establishment. After internal power struggles and a leadership change, it returned to supporting the presidency. After formal democracy was restored, the FLN initially failed to regain its prominent position; in the 1997 parliamentary elections it emerged as the third-largest party, receiving 14% of the vote and winning 69 of the 231 seats. However, it won a landslide victory in the 2002 elections, winning 199 of the 389 seats.

The party nominated Ali Benflis as its candidate for the 2004 presidential elections. He finished as runner-up to the incumbent Abdelaziz Bouteflika, but received only 6.4% of the vote. In 2005, the FLN formed the Presidential Alliance with the National Rally for Democracy (RND) and the Movement of Society for Peace (MSP).

The 2007 parliamentary elections saw the FLN reduced to 163 seats, although the FLN's Abdelaziz Belkhadem remained Prime Minister. Bouteflika was the party's candidate in the 2009 presidential elections, which he won with 90% of the vote.

In 2012, the MSP left the Presidential Alliance and joined the Green Algeria Alliance. Despite that, the FLN remained the largest party following the 2012 parliamentary elections, winning 208 of the 462 seats. Bouteflika was re-elected on the FLN ticket in the 2014 presidential elections with 82% of the vote. The elderly and ailing Bouteflika is widely seen as a mere frontman for what has been often described as a "shadowy" group of generals and intelligence officers known to the Algerians collectively as le pouvoir ("the power") and whose individual members are called décideurs with The Economist writing in 2012 "The most powerful man in the land may be Mohamed Mediène, known as Toufiq who has headed military intelligence for two decades". General Mohamed Mediène, the chief of military intelligence from 1990 to 2015 was known to be a leading décideur within le pouvoir and for his secrecy with The Economist reporting on 21 September 2013: "Despite his leading role in defeating Islamic militants in a brutal civil war between 1991 and 2000, and his less public role as kingmaker in the pouvoir, General Mediene's face remains unknown; it is said that anyone who has seen it expires soon after." On 13 September 2015, it was announced that Mediène was retiring and President Bouteflika had appointed General Athmane Tartag to succeed him. Mediène's dismissal was viewed as the culmination of a long "behind-the-scenes power struggle" with Bouteflika, leaving the latter fully in charge and giving him more power to determine his own successor.

In the 2017 parliamentary elections, FLN won 164 of the 462 seats, thus losing 44 seats; however, thanks to the good performance of the RND (which won 100 seats), the Presidential Alliance was able to maintain a parliamentary majority and continue to rule the country.

==== Relationship with Jewish Algerians ====
Jews in Algeria were given French citizenship during the colonial era starting in 1870, while Muslims were denied citizenship by the French. The Jews in Algeria were seen as a go-between for French-Muslim relations; however, the lack of citizenship on behalf of the Muslims created tension between the two groups. During the Algerian War, Jews felt as if they were being forced to choose sides; they were either Algerian and fighting with the FLN for independence, or they were French and fighting with the French to keep Algeria as a colony. At the start of the Algerian War, the FLN offered Jews the opportunity to join their efforts, and in return Jews would be given Algerian citizenship when Algeria won independence. Most of the Jews in Algeria sided with the French government, much to the dismay of the FLN and their supporters. During the course of the war, Jews in Algeria began to feel as if the FLN was targeting Jews and not just the French people living in Algeria. This led to increased tensions between Jews and Muslims in the area. After the war, Algerian citizenship was only extended to Muslims whose fathers and grandfathers were Muslim at the time the FLN won independence from the French government and those who participated directly or indirectly in the national liberation movement. Algerian Jews were no longer considered Algerian, but they still retained French citizenship. With their French citizenship, the majority of Jews in Algeria decided to emigrate to France, with a small number of Jews deciding to emigrate to Israel and an even smaller number of Jews deciding to stay in Algeria under the rule of the FLN. Between 1961 and 1962, 130,000 out of Algeria's 140,000 Jews left for France, while around 10,000 emigrated to Israel.

== Ideology ==
The FLN's ideology was primarily Algerian nationalist, understood as a movement within a wider Arab nationalism and also a pan-Arab solidarity. It essentially drew its political self-legitimization from three sources: Nationalism, and the revolutionary war against France; Socialism, loosely interpreted as a popular anti-exploitation creed; Islam, defined as the main foundation for the national consciousness, and a crucial factor in solidifying the Algerian identity as separate from that of French Algerians or pied-noirs. Frantz Fanon was an FLN member and an important influence on the party's ideology during the independence struggle.

As the name implies, it viewed itself as a "front" composed of different social sectors and ideological trends, even if the concept of a monolithic Algerian polity gradually submerged this vision. A separate party ideology was not well developed at the time of independence, except insofar as it focused on the liberation of Algeria. This latter aspect led to the denial of or refusal to deal with the separate Berber identity held by Algerian Berbers who made up about 20% of Algeria, something which caused fierce opposition and led to the splintering of the movement immediately after independence, as Hocine Aït Ahmed set up the Berberist and pro-democracy Socialist Forces Front (FFS) in Tizi Ouzou and began a rebellion in Kabylia which was defeated by the government in 1965.

=== Anti-colonialism and Islamism ===
Anti-colonialism is widely considered as the core value in Algerian official discourse during its entire contemporary political and social history, especially during the formation of the FLN and later during the Islamist movement. The Muslim population had been discriminated against at a constitutional level, as illustrated by the fact that French settlers formed up to 80% of the membership in three departmental councils in 1875; and at a local level, the metropolitan model composed of a major and municipal council only granted voting rights to 5% of the adult male Muslim population until 1919, when the number increased to 25%. Therefore, its nationalist outlook was also closely interwoven with anti-colonialism and anti-imperialism, something which would remain a lasting characteristic of Algerian foreign policy.

Islamism maintained its dominance in Algerian politics because of the specific social contexts during different periods. The humiliating failure of the Mokrani Revolt in 1871 facilitated the pro-Islamism sentiment in the society as people generally regarded Islam as the long-lasting and never-fading symbolic opposition towards the French rule; also the Italian invasion of Libya in 1911 provoked sympathy in the Muslim community and strengthened the Islamic cultural identity and these two events together consolidated the Islamism-Colonialism opposition rhetoric.

The politicization of Islam started with the noticeable wave of Islamic discourse led by religious scholars such as Jamal al-Din al-Afghani (1838–1897), Mohammed Abduh (1849–1905) and Rashid Rida (1865–1935) that focused on resisting foreign economic control and establishing an Islamic country based on the sharia, which were the core values of the Algerian Ulama. The movement absolutely rejected atheism and was not secularist, contrary to widespread perception in the West, and Islamism was perhaps the most important mobilizing ideology during the Algerian War. Still, after independence, the party would in practice assume a strongly modernist interpretation of Islam, supported the social transformation of Algerian society, the emancipation of women, etc., and worked only through secular institutions.

Before Col. Chadli Bendjedid came into power in 1971, the Islamic movement had been rather successfully monitored and subdued by the government during the previous 20 years, but the Iranian Revolution rekindled the movement and posed a greater threat to the state. Since Algerian independence, religion had been relegated to the role of legitimizing factor for the party-regime, especially under the presidency of Col. Houari Boumédiènne (1965–78), but even then Islam was considered the state religion and a crucial part of Algerian identity, as Boumédiènne himself took pride in his Quranic training. His predecessor Ahmed Ben Bella (1962–65) was more committed to the Islamic component of the regime, although always viewed as more of an Arab nationalist than an Islamic activist (and he remains far removed from what is today referred to as Algeria's Islamists). During the mid- to late-1980s, Bendjedid reintroduced religiously conservative legislation in an attempt to appease growing Islamist opposition. During and after the Algerian Civil War, the party's position has remained that of claiming Algerian Islam as a main influence, while simultaneously arguing that this must be expressed as a progressive and modern faith, even if the party generally keeps in line with the conservative social mores of Algeria's population. It has strongly condemned the radical-fundamentalist religious teachings of the Islamic Salvation Front (FIS) and other Islamist groups, even while supporting the inclusion of non-violent Islamist parties in the political system and working with them.

=== Arab nationalism and Pan-Arabism ===
Arab nationalism and Pan-Arabism are considered core principles of the FLN and Algerian nationalism. Arab themes were glorified as the foundation of Algerian nationalism that would fit into Pan-Arabism. A prominent member of the Algerian independence movement, Abdel-Hamid ibn Badis (1889–1940), emphasized the Arab and Muslim character of Algeria through his Association of Algerian Muslim Ulema, and famously coined the often-cited phrase: "Islam is our religion, Algeria is our homeland, Arabic is our language", while his fellow 'alim Ahmad Tawfiq al-Madani (1889–1983) wrote extensive historical writings in Arabic celebrating the Muslim and Arab ancestors of Algeria.

During the Algerian war of independence, the FLN emerged as the main socialist group after uniting with several smaller independence groups, and was strongly committed to Pan-Arabism. A major supporter of the Algerian independence movement was Gamal Abdel Nasser, whose mixture of Arab nationalism and revolution appealed to the Arabs in North Africa. He provided financial, diplomatic and military support to the FLN, and based the Algerian provisional government in Cairo. This played a major role in France's decision to wage war against him during the 1956 Suez Crisis. Once Algeria gained independence in 1962, Arab nationalist leader Ahmed Ben Bella was elected president after winning elections with 99.6 per cent of the votes. He composed the Algerian constitution in October 1963, which asserted that Islam was the state religion, Arabic was the sole national and official language of the state, Algeria was an integral part of the Arab world, and that Arabization was the first priority of the country to reverse French colonization.

Ben Bella was succeeded by Houari Boumédiène in 1965, who also pursued Arab socialist and Pan-Arabist policies. He drafted a new Algerian constitution in 1976 which declared "the unity of the Arab people is written in the community of the destinies of these people. When there will be the conditions for a unity based on the liberation of the popular masses, Algeria will engage itself in the promotion of the formulas of union, integration or fusion that may fully respond to the legitimate and deep aspirations of the Arab people". Like Ben Bella, Boumédiène imposed Arab socialism as the state ideology and declared Islam the state religion. He was more assertive than Ben Bella in carrying out Arabization, especially between 1970 and 1977. The year 1971 was declared the "year of Arabization". Chadli Bendjedid had talks with Libyan leader Muammar Gaddafi in 1988 about forming an Algeria-Libya Arab union. Instead the Arab Maghreb Union was formed in 1989.

=== Socialism ===
A historical reference of socialist values is the implementation of the Warnier Law of 1873, which allowed the selling of community land at an individual base toppled the economic power of the Algerian indigenous elites; the elimination of class structure undertoned the later FLN populism and socialist agendas. Such egalitarianism, which implies a liberation struggle, reflects the FLN's militant socialism during Ben Bella's period, who considered the struggle was to invent a new society to release the peasantry's potential.

This ideological construct of the FLN is controversial and disputed but can be analyzed through lenses of different socio-economic contexts. Given the global background of the Cuban Missile Crisis and the Cold War, Algeria was considered the entry point into the Third World in this ideological conflict; the FLN's ideologies under Ben Bella and Boumédiène were largely shaped by the fundamental needs of the country such as radical economic reforms, getting international aid and recognition, along with the domestic Islamic pressure.

Facing the grave economic consequences of the Algerian War of Independence that included the destruction of 8,000 villages and millions of acres of land, a centralized authority, in this case, the FLN, was forced to act and redress the problem through a Leninist and corporatist framework. In response, Ben Bella also experimented with the socialist autogestion among the Muslim workers who entered industrial and agricultural businesses that featured profit-sharing and equity. Ben Bella and his supporters in the FLN believed in the harmony between religion and socialism and it was in their political interest to renew the FLN party by leading a popular revolution to integrate Islam and socialism.

Despite being challenged by the Algerian Ulema and other domestic conservatives who criticized Ben Bella on the shallowness of his intentionally Islamism-leaning policies, the FLN kept its Marxist–Leninist organization principles that featured a secular institutional dominance over religion. The later FLN's ideological change towards anti-socialism and anti-communism can be illustrated by Kaid Ahmed's opposition towards Boumédiène's leftist agenda, which featured the radical agrarian revolution that hurt rich landowners who defended themselves on religious grounds and fueled the Islamic movement, which gradually took over the national sentiment later in the century. Starting in 1971 and ending in 1992, the government under Chadli Bendjedid was authoritative but collegial, less rigid on ideologies but more moderate on domestic and international issues, while Bendjedid and his advisers believed in socialism.

=== Communism ===
The organization initially committed itself to socialism, but understood this along the lines of Arab socialism, and opposed orthodox Marxism. The existence of different classes in Algerian society was generally rejected, even if several of the party's top ideologues were influenced to varying degrees by Marxist analysis.

Borrowed Marxist terminology was instead commonly reinterpreted by party radicals in terms of the conflict with France, e.g. casting the colonizer in the role of economic exploiter-oppressor as well as national enemy, while the label of "bourgeoisie" was applied to uncooperative or pro-French elites. The FLN absorbed some communist activists into its ranks during the War of Independence for pragmatic reasons but refused to allow them to organize separately from the FLN after the war. The FLN then quickly moved to dissolve the pro-Moscow Algerian Communist Party (PCA). However, since independent Algeria was set up as a one-party system under the FLN soon thereafter, many communist intellectuals were later co-opted into the regime at various stages. The cooperation occurred during the early Ben Bella and late Boumédiènne years when the Socialist Vanguard Party (PAGS), established in 1966, cooperated and tactically consulted with the FLN and recognized the FLN as the sole legitimate party in the country.

=== Contemporary developments ===
During all periods of Algerian post-colonial history, except for a few years between 1990 and 1996, the FLN has been a pillar of the political system and has primarily been viewed as a "pro-system" party. Its role as Algeria's liberators has remained the absolute cornerstone of the party's self-perception, and the defining feature of its otherwise somewhat fluid ideology. The FLN was close to former president Abdelaziz Bouteflika, who was made honorary chairman. It mixes its traditional populist interpretations of Algeria's nationalist-revolutionary and Islamic heritage with a pro-system conservatism, and support for gradual pro-market reform qualified by statist reflexes. Since the breakdown of the one-party system and its detachment from the state structure in c. 1988–1990, the FLN has been in favor of multi-party democracy, whereas it upheld itself as the only organization representing the Algerian people before this period.

The FLN was admitted into Socialist International (SI) as a consultative member at the SI's spring congress on 4–5 February 2013. It was expelled from the Socialist International during the 2019 protests in Algeria.

== Electoral history ==
=== Presidential elections ===
Election	Party candidate	Votes	%	Result
1963	Ahmed Ben Bella	5,805,103	99.6%	Elected ✓
1976	Houari Boumediene	7,976,568	99.5%	Elected ✓
1979	Chadli Bendjedid	7,736,697	99.4%	Elected ✓
1984	Chadli Bendjedid	9,664,168	99.42%	Elected ✓
1988	Chadli Bendjedid	10,603,067	93.26%	Elected ✓
1995	Boycotted			
1999	Abdelaziz Bouteflika	7,445,045	73.8%	Elected ✓
2004	Ali Benflis	653,951	6.42%	Lost ✗
2009	Abdelaziz Bouteflika	12,911,705	90.24%	Elected ✓
2014	Abdelaziz Bouteflika	8,332,598	81.53%	Elected ✓
2019	Did not run			
2024	Support for Abdelmadjid Tebboune			

=== People's National Assembly elections ===
Election	Party leader	Votes	%	Seats	+/–	Position	Governing?
1962	Ahmed Ben Bella	5,267,324	99.7%	196 / 196	▲196	▲1st	Sole legal party
1964	Ahmed Ben Bella	4,493,416	87.0%	196 / 196	Steady	1st	Sole legal party
1977	Houari Boumediene	6,037,537	75.84%	261 / 261	▲65	1st	Sole legal party
1982	Chadli Bendjedid	6,054,740	100%	282 / 282	▲21	1st	Sole legal party
1987	Chadli Bendjedid	9,910,631	100%	295 / 295	▲13	1st	Sole legal party
1997	Boualem Benhamouda	1,497,285	14.3%	62 / 380	▼233	▼3rd	Yes
2002	Abdelaziz Bouteflika	2.618.003	34.3%	199 / 389	▲137	▲1st	Yes
2007	Abdelaziz Bouteflika	1,315,686	22.98%	136 / 386	▼63	1st	Yes
2012	Abdelmalek Sellal	1,324,363	17.35%	208 / 462	▲72	1st	Yes
2017	Djamel Ould Abbes	1,681,321	25.99%	164 / 462	▼44	1st	Yes
2021	Abou El Fadhel Baadji	287,828	22.61%	98 / 407	▼66	1st	Yes
2026	Abdelkrim Benmbarek	736,395	17.57%	91 / 407	▼7	1st	Yes

== See also ==
- French rule in Algeria (1830–1962)
- The Battle of Algiers
- Jeanson network
