= Naima Farhi =

Algerian politician

Naima Farhi (born 1976 in Sétif) is an Algerian politician. Trained as a lawyer, Naima Farhi is the Sétif MP for the Movement El-Infitah. She also president of the Center for the Algerian woman, a structure that is to contribute to the combination of efforts to allow access of women to decision-making centers and equal opportunities. The advisory body also will seek to build bridges of friendship and cooperation with regional and international organizations and enhance the gains achieved in Algeria for the benefit of women. The observatory for the Algerian woman will set up a national advisory council and will open offices wilaya. Naima Farhi is the secretary general of the party El-Infitah Movement.
