= Republican Patriotic Rally =

Algerian political party

The Republican Patriotic Rally (Rassemblement Patriotique Républicain) is a minor political party in Algeria. In the 17 May 2007 People's National Assembly elections, the party won 1.47% of the vote and 2 out of 389 seats.
