= National Republican Alliance =

Political party in Algeria

National Republican Alliance التحالف الوطني الجمهوري
- Leader: Redha Malek
- Secretary-General: Hamza Latreche
- Founded: 5 May 1995; 31 years ago
- Ideology: Secularism; Anti-Islamism; Algerian nationalism
- Colors: Green; Red
- Council of the Nation: 0 / 174
- People's National Assembly: 1 / 407
- People's Provincial Assembly: 6 / 2,004
- Municipalities: 9 / 1,540
- People's Municipal Assemblies: 268 / 24,876

The National Republican Alliance (Arabic: التحالف الوطني الجمهوري; French: Alliance Nationale Républicaine, ANR) is a minor Algerian political party led by ex-Prime Minister Redha Malek and founded on 5 May 1995. It is sometimes considered an offshoot of the older FLN. The ANR is strongly anti-Islamist, and denounced the 1995 Sant'Egidio accords, while later backing the referendum on national reconciliation. It received 208,379 votes in the elections of June 1997, but boycotted the 2002 elections, claiming they would be rigged.

== 2007 elections ==
In the May, 2007 elections, the ANR received 126,444 votes, or 2.21%. This gave them 4 seats in parliament.

Name	Province
Hadj Bechikh	Mostaganem
Madjid Bektache	Béjaïa
Abderezak Chibane	Blida
Abdelkader Lourdjane	Tissemsilt

== Regional strength ==
In the Algerian legislative election, 2007, support for the ANR was higher than its national average (2.21%) in the following provinces:

- Tissemsilt Province 8.72%
- Mostaganem Province 7.63%
- Béjaïa Province 5.24%
- Blida Province 5.18%
- Khenchela Province 5.00%
- Ouargla Province 4.42%
- Algiers Province 4.16%
- Tipaza Province 3.98%
- Illizi Province 3.84%
- El Oued Province 3.83%
- Saïda Province 3.20%
- Béchar Province 3.18%
- El Bayadh Province 2.93%
- Jijel Province 2.76%
- Tiaret Province 2.64%
- Tlemcen Province 2.42%
- Relizane Province 2.36%
