= Progressive Republican Party (Algeria) =

Political party in Algeria

The Progressive Republican Party (Parti Républicain Progressiste) is a minor political party in Algeria.

The party participated in the 1991 Algerian parliamentary elections: the first multi-party elections in the country's history. They received 4872 votes, around 0.07% of the total votes, and won no seats.

In the 2007 Algerian parliamentary elections, the party received around 1.39% of total votes, failing to win a single seat.
