= 1982 Algerian parliamentary election =

- 5 March 1982
- All 282 seats in the People's National Assembly; 142 seats needed for a majority
- Turnout: 67.34%
Party	Leader	Seats	+/–
National Liberation Front	Chadli Bendjedid	282	+21
This lists parties that won seats. See the complete results below.

Parliamentary elections were held in Algeria on 5 March 1982. The country was a one-party state at the time, with the National Liberation Front (FLN) as the sole legal party. The FLN nominated 846 candidates for the 282 seats, with voters asked to express their preference by crossing out names on the ballot. Only 69 of the 136 incumbents who ran for re-election were successful. Voter turnout was 67.34%.

== Results ==
Party	Votes	%	Seats	+/–
National Liberation Front			282	+21
Total			282	+21
Total votes	6,054,740	–		
Registered voters/turnout	8,990,820	67.34		
Source: IPU
