= Movement of National Understanding =

Political party in Algeria

The Movement of National Understanding (Mouvement de l'Entente Nationale) is a minor political party in Algeria. In the 2002 elections, it received 0.2% of the vote. As of the early 2000s, it has one member of parliament. In the 17 May 2007 People's National Assembly elections, the party won 2.14% of the vote and 4 out of 389 seats.
