= Islamic Renaissance Movement =

Political party in Algeria

Islamic Renaissance Movement: حركة النهضة الاسلامية; Mouvement de la renaissance islamique
- General Secretary: Mohammed Dhouibi
- Founded: 1990; 36 years ago
- Headquarters: Algiers, Algeria
- Ideology: Conservative democracy; Islamic democracy
- Political position: Centre-right to right-wing
- National affiliation: Green Algeria Alliance (2012-2017)
- People's National Assembly: 2 / 407

The Islamic Renaissance Movement (Arabic: حركة النهضة الاسلامية, Ḥarakat An-Nahḑa Al-Islāmiyya; French: Mouvement de la Renaissance Islamique, MRI) is a moderate Islamist political party of Algeria.

== History ==
The party was established in autumn 1990 when the Constantine-based association Jamiyat al-Nahda was transformed into a political party. Jamiyat al-Nahda had been established in 1988 by Abdallah Djaballah, and he decided to form the MRI after the Islamic Salvation Front rejected calls for an Islamic alliance. Its foundation was also a response to the FIS claim to hold a monopoly on Islamist politics.

In the 1991 parliamentary elections the party received 2.2% of the vote, failing to win a seat. The 1997 elections saw its vote share increase to 8.7%, resulting in it winning 34 of the 231 seats. However, it received just 0.6% of the vote in the 2002 elections, reducing it to a single seat. It recovered in the 2007 elections, receiving 3.4% of the vote and winning five of the 389 seats.

The party contested the 2012 elections as part of the Islamist Green Algeria Alliance. The alliance received 6.2% of the vote, winning 49 seats, down from the combined 60 won in 2007.

== See also ==
- List of Islamic political parties
