= Mahfoud Nahnah =

Algerian politician

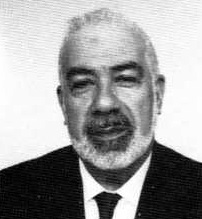
Mahfoud Nahnah

Mahfoud Nahnah (Arabic: محفوظ نحناح; 27 January 1942 – 19 June 2003) was an Algerian politician who served as the leader of the Islamist political party Movement of Society for Peace (commonly referred to as Hams) in Algeria.

Nahnah was born in Blida and later studied literature at the University of Algiers. He became a teacher of Arabic after Algeria achieved independence in 1962. Influenced by Egyptian professors, he joined the Muslim Brotherhood.

In 1976, Nahnah was sentenced to 15 years in prison for cutting telephone wires in an act of opposition to the National Charter of that year. After being freed four years later, he helped found the El Islah Oual Irchad (Reform and Guidance) charitable association with Mohammed Bouslimani, as well as the Islamic Preaching League with Ahmed Sahnoun, uniting major figures of the Algerian Islamist movement such as Abbassi Madani and Mohammed Said. However, he decided not to join the Islamic Salvation Front (FIS) because he was opposed to its founding principles.

On 6 December 1990, after the FIS was successful in local elections, Nahnah established his own party and called it Hamas (later renamed Movement of Society for Peace, or MSP). Seeing FIS as overambitious to the point of hubris, he emphasized the importance of gradual, step-by-step change and reform from within. He felt that the military and the West were not ready to allow Algeria even to become a full democracy at that time, much less an Islamic state.

Because of Nahnah's cautious practices, his party remained legal after the military coup of 1992, and in November 1995 he ran for president (with FIS banned) and finished second to General Liamine Zeroual with about 25% of the vote. He attempted to run again in 1999, but was disqualified by the courts for not having fought in the Algerian War of Independence, despite being born before July 1942 (which was an allowed exemption according to the Algerian Constitution, article 73).

Nahnah died of leukemia on 19 June 2003 at 61 years of age. He was succeeded as head of the MSP by Bouguerra Soltani. He was buried at the El Alia Cemetery.
