= National Movement for Nature and Development =

Political party in Algeria

The National Movement for Nature and Development (Mouvement National pour la Nature et le Développement) is a minor Green political party in Algeria. In the 17 May 2007 People's National Assembly elections, the party won 2.00% of the vote and 7 out of 389 seats.
