= Democratic and Social Movement (Algeria) =

Political party in Algeria

Democratic and Social Movement الحركة الديمقراطية والاجتماعية
- French name: Mouvement Démocratique et Social
- Abbreviation: MDS
- Leader: Hamid Ferhi
- Founder: Bachir Hadj Ali
- Founded: 1966
- Preceded by: Algerian Communist Party (unofficial)
- Headquarters: Algiers, Algeria
- Ideology: Socialism; Marxism; Secularism
- Political position: Left-wing
- National affiliation: Forces of the Democratic Alternative

Website
- mdsalgerie.wordpress.com

The Democratic and Social Movement (Arabic: الحركة الديمقراطية والاجتماعية, romanized: al-Ḥarakah al-Dīmuqrāṭīyah wa-al-Ijtimāʻīyah; French: Mouvement Démocratique et Social, MDS) is a political party in Algeria that was founded in 1966.

== History ==
The party was founded in 1966 as the Socialist Vanguard Party (French: Parti de l'Avant-Garde Socialiste, PAGS) by Bachir Hadj Ali. Although not legally recognized, it persisted as a political opposition party throughout the one-party period in Algeria. As an outgrowth of the Algerian Communist Party (Parti Communiste Algérien), which disappeared soon after Algerian independence, the PAGS has consistently opposed the government, offering sharp criticism of all political leaders and most of their programs. Its members, referred to as "Pagsistes", had infiltrated almost every legally recognized mass association despite their unofficial status. The Pagsistes were especially prominent in such organizations as the UNJA and General Union of Algerian Workers (UGTA) encouraging leftist tendencies.

The PAGS coalition relationship with the regime ended when Chadli Bendjedid came to power, who sought to purge pagistes from positions of power within the state-party apparatus, and moved toward economic liberalization.

The party was legalized in 1989.

In 1993, PAGS was reconstructed as Ettehadi by El Hachemi Chérif. A group who wanted to retain the communist legacy of the party broke away and formed the Algerian Party for Democracy and Socialism. During the Algerian Civil War, Ettehadi strongly opposed the Islamists and supported the banning of Islamic Salvation Front, (FIS).

In 1999, Ettehadi was reconstructed as the Democratic and Social Movement (Mouvement Démocratique et Social). In the 17 May 2007 People's National Assembly elections, the MDS won 0.89% of the vote and 1 out of 389 seats.

On 9 January 2022, MDS's national co-ordinator, Fethi Ghares, was given a two-year prison sentence and a 200, 000 DA fine for "undermining national unity", as part of what Human Rights Watch called a wider "assault on fundamental freedoms" by the Algerian government. He received additional custodial sentences in 2024 and 2025.

== Regional strength ==
In the Algerian legislative election, 2007, support for the MDS was higher than its national average (0.89%) in the following provinces:

- Mascara Province 6.73%
- Tissemsilt Province 3.89%
- Béjaïa Province 3.55%
- Béchar Province 2.66%
- Saïda Province 2.42%
- Tébessa Province 2.19%
- Mila Province 2.16%
- Relizane Province 2.13%
- Chlef Province 2.06%
- Sidi Bel Abbès Province 1.81%
- Tlemcen Province 1.43%
- Souk Ahras Province 1.39%
- Boumerdès Province 1.35%
- Skikda Province 1.23%
- Annaba Province 1.13%
