= Elections in Algeria =

Algeria elects on the national level a head of state – the president – and a legislature. The president is elected for a five-year term by the people. People's National Assembly (Assemblée Populaire Nationale) has 407 members, elected for a five-year term in multi-seat constituencies by proportional representation. Twelve seats in the national assembly are reserved for Algerians abroad, following an electoral reform published in Algeria’s Official Gazette on 4 May 2026. The Council of the Nation (Conseil de la nation) has 174 members, 116 members elected by communal councils and 58 members appointed by the president. The V-Dem Institute Democracy Report classified Algeria as an electoral autocracy. Restrictive nomination rules prevent competitive elections.

Algeria has a multi-party system, with numerous political parties in which no one party often has a chance of gaining power alone, and parties must work with each other to form coalition governments.

According to the U.S Department of State, the elections are well organized and conducted without significant problems or irregularities, but they noted restrictions on civil liberties during the election period and lack of transparency in vote-counting procedures.

Until 12 November 2008, presidents were limited to two terms; on this date, amendments to the constitution were passed which removed the term limits. Term limits were later reinstated in the 2016 constitution reform by President Abdelaziz Bouteflika. Another constitutional amendment was put to the vote by President Abdelmadjid Tebboune and accepted by a referendum on the 1st of November 2020. The amendment received 67% of votes from those that turned out to vote, however the turnout was less than 24%.

The last legislative election was held on 2 July 2026. The last presidential election was held on 7 September 2024.

== Latest election ==
=== Presidential ===
Candidate	Party	Votes	%
Abdelmadjid Tebboune	Independent	7,976,291	84.30
Abdelaali Hassani Cherif	Movement of Society for Peace	904,642	9.56
Youcef Aouchiche	Socialist Forces Front	580,495	6.14
Total		9,461,428	100.00

On 7 September 2024, the 2024 Algerian presidential election took place. The final results were declared on 14 September 2024 by the Constitutional Court, stating that Abdelmadjid Tebboune received 7,976,291 votes (84.30%), Abdelaali Hassani Cherif received 904,642 votes (9.56%) and Youcef Aouchiche received 580,495 votes (6.14%). 46.1 percent of people turned out to vote.

=== Legislative ===
Graph of the party split among 407 seats.
Party	Votes	%	Seats
National Liberation Front (Algeria)	736,395	17.57	91
Democratic National Rally	641,623	15.31	74
Future Front	523,915	12.50	56
Movement of Society for Peace	431,743	10.30	43
National Construction Movement	376,283	8.98	40
Voice of the People (Algeria)	221,726	5.29	16
Socialist Forces Front	96,111	2.29	12
Dignity Party (Algeria)	91,890	2.19	5
New Dawn (Algeria)	80,871	1.93	6
Rally for Hope for Algeria	78,026	1.86	3
Freedom and Justice Party (Algeria)	69,699	1.66	6
Workers' Party (Algeria)	59,991	1.43	3
Justice and Development Front	37,583	0.90	4
Islamic Renaissance Movement	34,136	0.81	2
Jil Jadid	33,150	0.79	3
New Algeria Front	32,092	0.77	1
Rally for Culture and Democracy	30,510	0.73	4
National Republican Alliance	19,723	0.47	1
Good Governance Front	17,876	0.43	1
Free Citizens' Front	13,229	0.32	1
Party of Algerian Renewal	10,353	0.25	1
National Unity and Development Party	6,826	0.16	1
Other	308,467	7.36	0
Independents	238,293	5.69	33
Total	4,190,511	100.00	407

== Result in history ==
=== 1963 Algerian presidential election ===
Candidate	Party	Votes	%
Ahmed Ben Bella	National Liberation Front (Algeria)	5,805,103	99.61
Against		22,515	0.39
Total		5,827,618	100.00

=== 1962 Algerian Constituent Assembly election ===
Party	Votes	%	Seats
National Liberation Front (Algeria)	5,267,324	99.65	196
Against	18,680	0.35	0
Total	5,286,004	100.00	196

== See also ==
- Electoral calendar
- Electoral system
