= Justice and Development Front =

Political party in Algeria

Justice and Development Front جبهة العدالة والتنمية Front pour la justice et le développement
- Leader: Abdallah Djaballah
- Founded: 2011
- Split from: Movement for National Reform
- Ideology: Islamic democracy; Islamism; Algerian nationalism; Social conservatism; Economic liberalism
- Political position: Right-wing
- People's National Assembly: 4 / 407

The Justice and Development Front, sometimes translated as the Front for Justice and Development (Arabic: جبهة العدالة والتنمية, romanized: Jabhat al-ʻAdālah wa-al-Tanmiyah; French: Front pour la justice et le développement), is an Islamist political party in Algeria led by Abdallah Djaballah. Djaballah is the former leader of the Movement for National Reform.

The party was inspired by Turkey's Justice and Development Party (AKP).

== See also ==
- List of Islamic political parties
