= 1964 Algerian parliamentary election =

- 20 September 1964
- All 138 seats in the National Assembly; 70 seats needed for a majority
- Turnout: 84.99%
Party	Leader	Seats	+/–
National Liberation Front	Ahmed Ben Bella	138	−58
This lists parties that won seats. See the complete results below.

Parliamentary elections were held in Algeria on 20 September 1964. The country was a one-party state at the time, with the National Liberation Front (FLN) as the sole legal party. The FLN submitted a single list of 138 candidates for the 138 seats, of whom 72 were incumbent members of parliament. Voter turnout was 85%.

== Results ==
Party	Votes	%	Seats	+/–
National Liberation Front	4,493,416	87.00	138	0
Against	671,430	13.00	–	–
Total	5,164,846	100.00	138	0
Valid votes	5,164,846	99.75		
Invalid/blank votes	12,785	0.25		
Total votes	5,177,631	100.00		
Registered voters/turnout	6,091,991	84.99		
Source: Nohlen et al.
