= Bouguerra Soltani =

Algerian politician

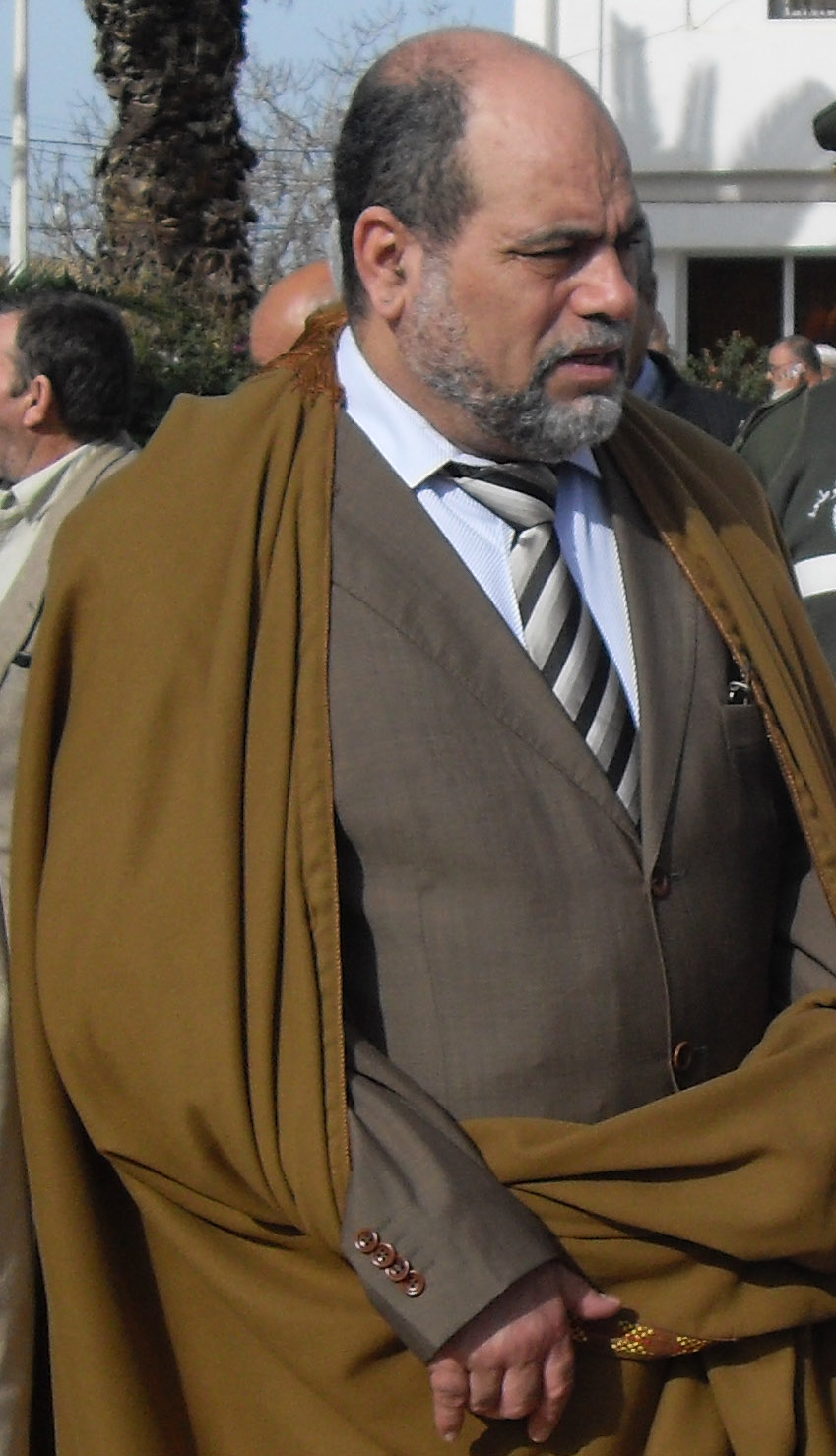

Bouguerra Soltani (Arabic: أبو جرة سلطاني) (or also referred to as Abu Jerra Sultani, Boudjerra Soltani, Aboudjerra Soltani or other spellings) (born in 1954 in Tébessa Province) was the leader of the Algerian party Mouvement de la Societé pour la Paix (Movement of the Society for Peace, abbreviated MSP or Hamas), which is reformist-Islamist and considered close to the doctrine of the Muslim Brotherhood.
