= People's Provincial Assembly =

Political body governing the provinces of Algeria

The People's Provincial Assembly (also known by its French acronym APW, short for Assemblée populaire de wilaya; Arabic: المجلس الشعبي الولائي, romanized: al-Maǧlis aš-Šaʿbī al-Wilāʾī) is the political body governing the provinces of Algeria. It is composed of an assembly elected on universal suffrage for five years. This assembly further elects a president, the president of the People's Provincial Assembly. The highest person in the administrative pyramid of the provinces is the Wāli, which is chosen by the president. Local elections for the PMAs and the PPAs were held on November 27, 2021.
