= Party of Algerian Renewal =

Political party in Algeria

Party of Algerian Renewal حزب التجديد الجزائري Parti du renouveau algérien
- Founder: Noureddine Boukrouh
- Founded: 1989
- Ideology: Liberalism
- People's National Assembly: 1 / 407

The Party of Algerian Renewal (Arabic: حزب التجديد الجزائري, French: Parti du renouveau algérien) is a minor liberal political party in Algeria.

== History and profile ==
The Party of Algerian Renewal was established in 1989. Noureddine Boukrou is the founder of the party.

In the 2002 elections it received 0.3% of the vote and had one member of parliament. In the 17 May 2007 People's National Assembly elections, the party won 1.80% of the vote and 4 out of 389 seats.
