= Abdallah Djaballah =

Algerian politician

Saad Abdallah Djaballah
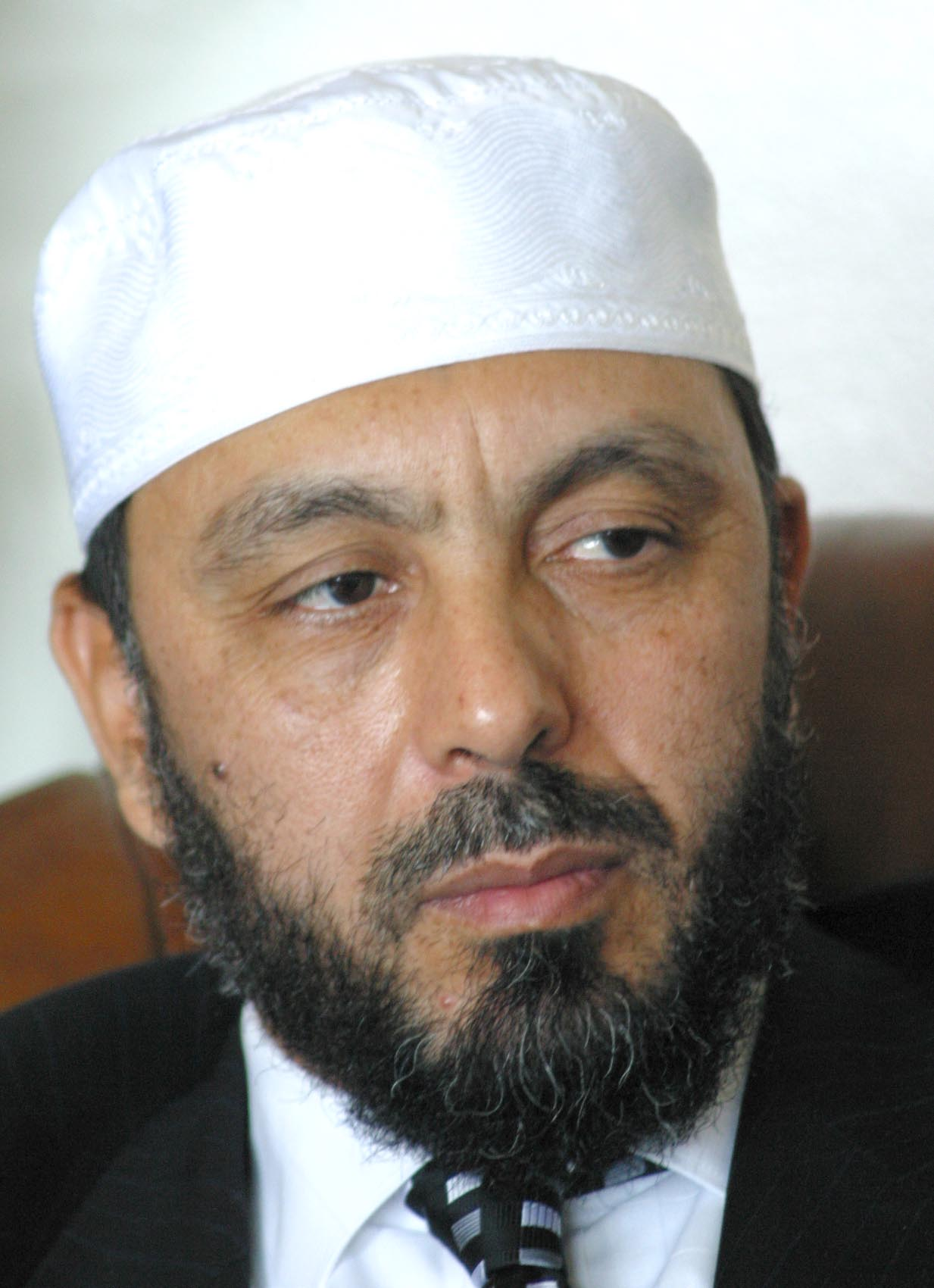

Personal details
- Born: May 2, 1956 (age 70) Skikda, Algeria
- Party: Justice and Development Party

Saad Abdallah Djaballah (Arabic: سعد عبدالله جاب الله, romanized: Saʻd Allāh Jāb Allāh, born May 2, 1956, in Skikda) is an Algerian politician and leader of the Movement for National Reform (Ḥarakat al-Iṣlāḥ al-Waṭaniyy, also known as the MRN and El-Islah), an Islamist political party he led following a split from the Islamic Renaissance Party (al-Nahda), which he had founded but lost control of. Djaballah ran for the presidency twice, in 1999 and 2004. In 1999, he withdrew along with other opposition candidates just hours before voting began. In 2004, he finished third in the election, receiving about 5 percent of the vote. In 2011, Djaballah founded the Justice and Development Front.
