= People's National Assembly =

Lower house of the Algerian Parliament

People's National Assembly المجلس الشعبي الوطني
- 10th Legislature

Type
- Type: Lower house of the Parliament of Algeria

History
- Founded: September 1962

Leadership
- President of the Assembly: Khalida Boufedeche, FLN since 28 July 2026

Structure
- Seats: 407
- Political groups: Government (164): FLN (90); RND (74); Opposition (208): FM (56); MSP (43); El Binaa (40); PVP (15); FFS (12); PFD (6); PLJ (6); El Karama (5); FJD (4); RCD (4); Jil Jadid (3); PT (3); TAJ (3); MRI (2); PUND (1); FAN (1); FBG (1); PRA (1); ANR (1); FCL (1); Others (35): Independent (33); Vacant (2) (Note: Deputies Ammar Barkat (FLN–Mila) and Abdelhak Bendjaafar (PVP–Oran) can't be considered elected until a decision has been made on ongoing criminal procedures. Their seats remain vacant.)
- Length of term: 5 years

Elections
- Voting system: Open list party-list proportional representation (largest remainder method) with 5% electoral threshold
- Last election: 2 July 2026
- Next election: 2031

Meeting place
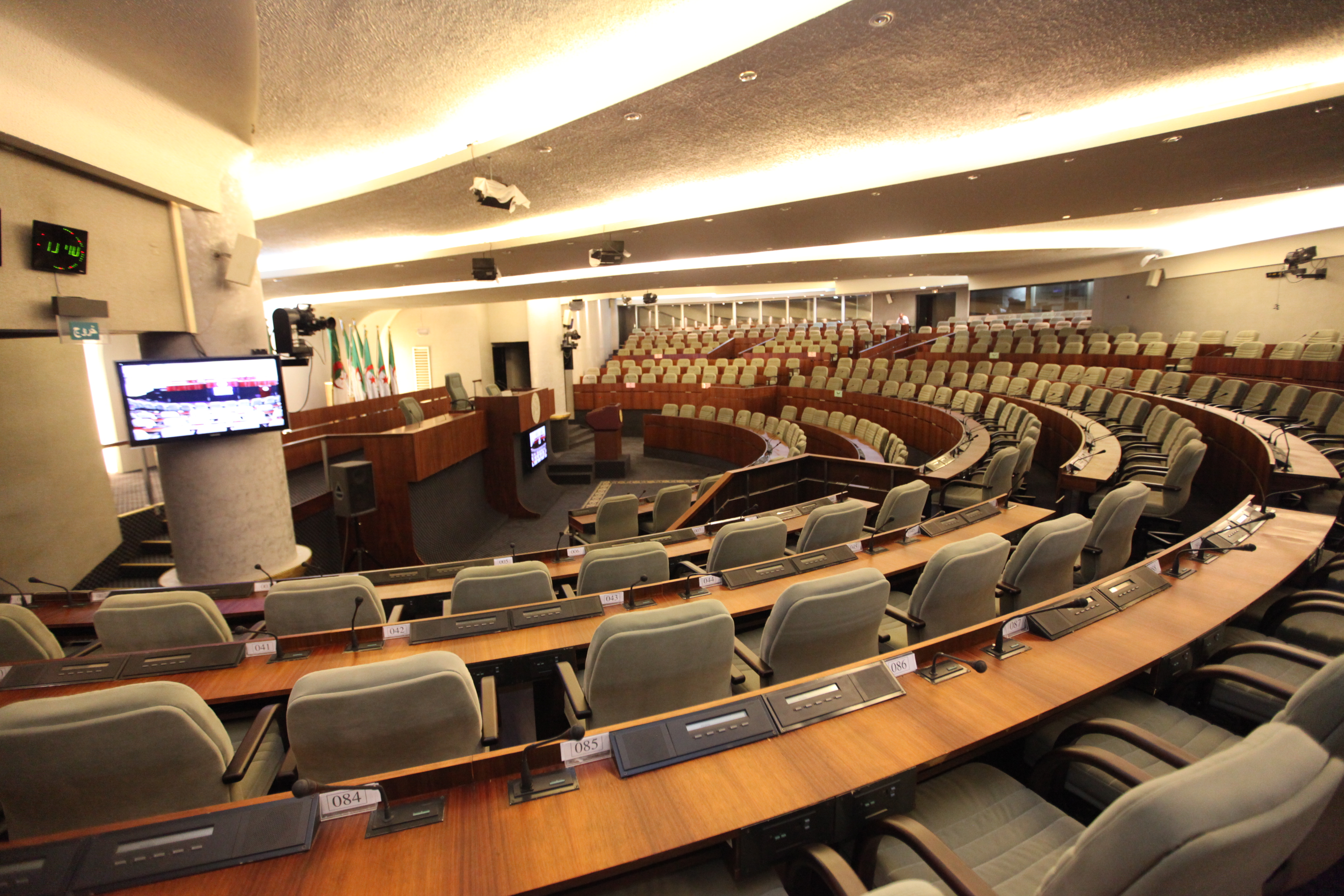
- People's National Assembly building Algiers, Algiers Province

Website
- www.apn.dz

Constitution
- Constitution of Algeria

The People's National Assembly (Arabic: المجلس الشعبي الوطني, romanized: al-Majlis al-Sha'abi al-Watani; abbreviated APN) is the lower house of the Algerian Parliament. It is composed of 407 members directly elected by the population. Of the 407 seats, 12 are reserved for Algerians living abroad. Members of the People's National Assembly are directly elected through proportional representation in multiple-member districts and serve terms lasting five years at a time. The last election for this body was held on 2 July 2026. The minimum age for election to the Assembly is 28.

There are 69 districts, corresponding to the wilayas (provinces), and an overseas constituency, which send representatives to this body. The current speaker of the APN is Khalida Boufedeche, a member of the National Liberation Front (FLN). The minimum age to vote in Algeria is 18 and voting is not compulsory.

== History ==
The first election for the People's National Assembly was held on 20 September 1962. In 1963, the President of the Republic of Algeria, Ahmed Ben Bella, halted the activities of the APN and set up a Revolution Council lasting from 1965 to 1976. The APN was reestablished in 1976 with the passage of Algeria's new constitution, at the time only a unicameral legislature. Up until 1991, the ruling party was the National Liberation Front (FLN), and in fact, the 1976 Algerian constitution considered the FLN as the preferred Algerian political party. The first APN election with multiple parties was held in December 1991. After a predicted Islamic Salvation Front (FIS) victory, a fundamentalist opposition party, the Algerian People's National Armed Forces canceled the elections. A substitute legislative body, the National Consultative Council, was established in April 1992 and lasted until May 1994, when the National Transitional Council ruled for until the next elections, held on 5 June 1997. In 1996, the legislature split into two chambers forming the Algerian Parliament with the ratification of a new constitution.

=== Women in Parliament ===
After the 1997 elections, women composed 3.4% of APN members.

By 2012, Algerian women occupied 31 percent of parliamentary seats, placing the country 26th worldwide and 1st in the Arab world.

== Role ==
The People's National Assembly is an institution of the Republic and, together with the Council of the Nation, forms one of the chambers of the Parliament. As such, it votes the law, monitors government action and evaluates public policies. Its powers are fixed by the Constitution.

== Dissolution ==
The President of the Republic can dissolve the People's National Assembly, and the only one authorized to do so. According to article 147 of the Constitution, the President of the Republic can decide on the dissolution of the National People's Congress or on early legislative elections, after consultations with the President of the APN, the President of the Council of the Nation and the Prime Minister.

== Electoral system ==
The National People's Assembly is made up of 407 seats filled by multi-member proportional representation in 69 constituencies corresponding to the wilayas (provinces) of the country, with an additional overseas constituency. Each constituency is allocated a number of seats according to its population, with a minimum of two seats per constituency. After counting the votes, the seats are distributed according to the largest remainder method, without an electoral threshold.

Before the 2021 election (which was the first after 10 new provinces were created in 2019), there was a constituency for each of the 48 provinces, plus four constituencies for Algerians living overseas. The province-based constituencies were guaranteed a minimum of four seats each.

== Electoral history ==
- Algerian Constituent Assembly election
- Algerian legislative election of September 20, 1964
- Algerian legislative election of February 25, 1977
- Algerian legislative election of March 5, 1982
- Algerian legislative election of February 26, 1987
- Algerian legislative election of December 25, 1991
- Algerian legislative election of June 5, 1997
- Algerian legislative election of May 30, 2002
- Algerian legislative election of May 17, 2007
- Algerian legislative election of May 10, 2012
- Algerian legislative election of May 4, 2017
- Algerian legislative election of June 12, 2021
- Algerian legislative election of July 2, 2026

== Organization ==
=== Bureau ===
==== President of the People's National Assembly ====
The president of the People's National Assembly has a role of directing debates and organizing the work of the Assembly. He is the fourth person of the State in the order of precedence during the protocol ceremonies, behind the President of the Republic, the Prime Minister and finally the President of the Council of the Nation.

In the legislative procedure, the president opens and closes the meeting, leads the debates and enforces the rules. He may be replaced in these functions by one of the vice-presidents.

It also has important constitutional prerogatives: it appoints three of the nine members of the Constitutional Court; it must be consulted by the President of the Republic before he exercises some of his constitutional powers (such as dissolution or concerning full powers in times of crisis). He can also at any time seize the Constitutional Court to verify the constitutionality of a law before its promulgation. It can also decide, with the Bureau, to reform the rules and the functioning of the People's National Assembly.

The president of the People's National Assembly is elected at the beginning of the legislature for the duration of the latter.

Although the information is not made public, the amount of the compensation of the president of the APN is known and amounts to about 600,000 dinars, significantly higher than that of the deputies.

==== Vice presidents ====
The nine vice-presidents of the People's National Assembly, the distribution of which is the subject of a consensus between the different political groups which nominate their candidates beforehand, essentially aim to replace the president of the APN at the perch if this one is prevented, with a successive order of replacement going from the first to the ninth vice-president.

=== Commissions ===
==== Permanent legislative committees ====
The permanent committees have an important monitoring role: they can conduct hearings and set up fact-finding missions. They can monitor, through reports, the application of laws by the Government.

==== Commissions of inquiry ====
Each assembly can create a parliamentary commission of inquiry by passing a resolution. They are trained to collect information either on specific facts or on the management of public services or national companies, with a view to submitting their conclusions to the assembly that created them. A commission of inquiry cannot be created on facts which gave rise to legal proceedings and as long as these proceedings are in progress. If a commission has already been created, its mission ends upon the opening of a judicial investigation relating to the facts on which it is responsible for investigating. The members of the committees of inquiry are appointed in such a way as to ensure proportional representation of the political groups. Committees of inquiry are of a temporary nature. Their mission ends with the submission of their report and, at the latest, at the expiration of a period of six months from the date of the adoption of the resolution which created them.

=== Political groups ===
According to the regulations of the National Assembly, the "deputies can regroup by political affinities" in parliamentary groups. They must contain at least ten members. The political group must present at the opening of the legislature to the President of the People's National Assembly a political declaration signed by its members.

In addition to the full members of the group, who are generally members of the same party (FLN, RND, FFS, etc.), some deputies can "relate" to a group: they are not then included in the quota. minimum of 10 required for group formation. These are usually members from small parties or without labels close to the tendency of the main political movement behind the formation of the group.

The groups decide, with the president of the People's National Assembly, the areas of the hemicycle where they will sit. They are then the sole judges of how to distribute their members and relatives within this zone. They have their own organization and their own rules of procedure, elect from among themselves a president who will represent them within the Conference of Presidents and who will have several important prerogatives (such as the request or on the contrary the opposition to the creation of a special committee, the right to obtain a suspension of the session to convene the group, to request the vote by public ballot, to call in session for the verification of the quorum on the occasion of a vote, to prepare the order of monthly parliamentary day specific to their group, to propose or oppose the initiation of simplified engagement procedures. Each group, depending on its numerical weight within the Assembly, appoints its representatives within the Bureau and different committees, depending on their size, their own financial subsidy and have offices and rooms to meet.

== Building ==
The building of the People's National Assembly is the former city hall of the municipality of Greater Algiers, at Boulevard Che-Guevara on the Algiers monumental waterfront.

== See also ==
- List of presidents of the People's National Assembly (Algeria)
- Parliament of Algeria
- Council of the Nation
- Politics of Algeria
- List of legislatures by country
