= Killing of Djamel Ben Ismail =

2021 killing in Algeria

Murder of Djamel Ben Ismail
- Part of 2021 Algeria wildfires
- Location: Larbaâ Nath Irathen, Algeria
- Date: 11 August 2021
- Attack type: Burning alive and stabbing
- Victim: Djamel Ben Ismail
- Perpetrators: Local mobs MAK
- Convictions: 49 sentenced to death 28 sentenced to 2-10 years in prison, along with fines ranging 100,000 to 200,000 DA; 5 MAK members convicted in absentia for involvement, including Ferhat Mehenni

The murder of Djamel Ben Ismail took place on 11 August 2021 in the town of Larbaâ Nath Irathen, in the region of Kabylia, Algeria, following his lynching by a mob who falsely accused him of lighting deadly wildfires during the 2021 Algeria wildfires crisis.

== Background ==
Djamel Ben Ismail (Arabic: جمال بن اسماعيل) was a 38-year old Algerian artist and musician. Prior to his murder, Ben Ismail tweeted that he would head to Kabylia, 320 km from his home, to "give a hand to our friends" fighting the ongoing wildfires.

== Murder ==
Upon Ben Ismail's arrival in the town of Larbaâ Nath Irathen, local residents falsely accused him of being an arsonist because he was not from the area. Upon hearing this, he turned himself in at a local police station to explain that he was just a volunteer. A crowd gathered around the police station on the main square of the town, eventually dragging him out and attacking him. Aged 38, he was killed after being burned alive by the mob, with some taking selfies. Three women and a man stabbed him before he was burned, and a man stabbed his corpse after he died.

== Reactions ==
President Abdelmadjid Tebboune strongly condemned the lynching, stating "anyone who tries to undermine national unity will pay dearly," warning of "viruses that want to sow division," blaming "terrorist organizations" such as the Movement for the Self-Determination of Kabylia (MAK).

Mohcine Belabbas, president of the Rally for Culture and Democracy (RCD), condemned the lynching as a crime that "no reason, absolutely no one, can justify," calling it "abhorrent" and a "national trauma." The Socialist Forces Front (FFS) strongly condemned the murder, calling it "barbaric" and "criminal," and stating that it was an "isolated incident."

The Workers' Party (PT) expressed deep concern, calling the murder "extremely serious." PT general secretary Louisa Hanoune considered the assassination of Djamel Ben Ismail to be "an unprecedented wake-up call," a "tragedy which, under equal conditions, could have and can happen in any region of the country."

The head of the National Construction Movement, Abdelkader Bengrina, denounced the "lynching of unprecedented violence," calling the tragedy a "heinous crime" and condemning "barbaric acts committed by fanatics who are trying to discredit and tarnish the image of our brothers from Tizi Ouzou." The party leader warned citizens against "separatist rhetoric, which fuels and exacerbates racist and discriminatory conflicts, and whose sole purpose is to divide the people."

The brutal murder shocked the country after graphic images of it were shared on social media.

== Sentences ==
The high-security trial over the killing involved more than 100 suspects, many of whom were found guilty of a role in the murder. The criminal court of Dar El Beida sentenced 49 people to death for the homicide and mutilation of Ben Ismail. 28 others involved in the murder faced sentences ranging from two to ten years in prison, along with fines ranging from 100,000 to 200,000 Algerian dinar. Five people were convicted in absentia both for involvement in the killing and for belonging to the Movement for the Self-Determination of Kabylia (MAK) which is classified as a terrorist organization by Algeria, among them was the leader of the organization Ferhat Mehenni. On 26 August 2021, Algeria sentenced Ferhat Mehenni to life imprisonment and issued an international arrest warrant for him. In October 2023, on appeal, 38 of the death sentences were upheld, commuted to life imprisonment, 27 people were acquitted, while others received sentences from three to twenty years in prison.
