= Movement for the Self-Determination of Kabylia =

Kabyle nationalist political organization

Movement for the Self-Determination of Kabylia: French: Mouvement pour l’autodétermination de la Kabylie; Kabyle: Amussu i ufraniman n tmurt n iqbayliyen
- Abbreviation: MAK
- Leader: Ferhat Mehenni
- Founder: Ferhat Mehenni
- Founded: 30 June 2001; 25 years ago
- Banned: Algeria
- Succeeded by: URK
- Headquarters: Paris, France
- Ideology: Kabyle nationalism Separatism Secularism; Amazighism
- Colors: Blue; Red; Yellow

Party flag

Website
- https://afraniman.org

The Movement for the Self-Determination of Kabylia (French: Mouvement pour l'autodétermination de la Kabylie, Kabyle: Amussu i ufraniman n tmurt n iqbayliyen, MAK), formerly the Movement for the Autonomy of Kabylia (French: Mouvement pour l'autonomie de la Kabylie), from 2001 to 2013, is a Kabyle nationalist and pro-independence political organization seeking the independence of Kabylia from Algeria. It was founded by the Kabyle Amazigh activist Ferhat Mehenni, now president of the Provisional Government of Kabylia in exile, after the "Black Spring" demonstrations in 2001. In May 2021, the movement was designated a terrorist organization by Algeria. In December 2025, MAK symbolically proclaimed Kabyle independence in a ceremony in France.

== History and activities ==
=== History ===
The organization started as the Movement for the Autonomy of Kabylia and was founded following the events of the Black Spring in Kabylia and Algiers in 2001, during which protests by local Kabyle communities and activists were met with violence from the Algerian state which resulted in 128 deaths.

The Movement for the Autonomy of Kabylia renamed itself into the Movement for the Self-Determination of Kabylia in 2013, marking a shift from demands of regional autonomy into independence. The newly renamed organization demanded a referendum among the population of Kabylia for a vote of independence.

The same year, the Provisional Government of Kabylia (GPK) was founded in Paris by the movement.

On 14 December 2025, MAK symbolically proclaimed the independence of Kabylia from Paris, France. The date was chosen in reference to the Declaration on the Granting of Independence to Colonial Countries and Peoples from the United Nations of December 14, 1960.

=== Allegations of terrorism ===
Since 2021, the MAK has been classified as a terrorist organization by the Algerian government after the Algerian authorities alleged that MAK members were planting car bombs. The founder of MAK, Mehenni, was arrested by the French authorities and placed in police custody in 2021 as part of an investigation into organised money laundering in relation to sports betting.

The MAK consistently denies any involvement in violent or terrorist activities, and calls them unproven accusations by the Algerian government. MAK also states that it is a pacifist movement with no objectives of armed insurgency.

Algerian authorities accused MAK of ordering the widespread 2021 Algeria wildfires in the region of Kabylia. Five members of MAK were convicted in absentia for involvement in the murder of Djamel Ben Ismail on August 11, 2021. Among the members was the organization's leader, Ferhat Mehenni. On August 26, 2021, Algeria issued an international arrest warrant for Ferhat Mehenni. According to Amnesty International, the Algerian government sentenced at least 10 individuals to death solely "based on their political affiliations or alleged ties to the Movement for the Self-determination of Kabylie (MAK)" in what it describes as unfair trials.

In October 2021, Algerian authorities claimed to have thwarted a plot by MAK to carry out armed attacks in Algeria, allegedly planned by Israel and "a country in North Africa." 17 suspects were arrested as they were preparing the attacks.

In August 2024, Algeria foiled a terrorist plot allegedly linked to the MAK. The plan involved smuggling firearms to Algeria via Béjaïa from Marseille, France, ahead of the 2024 Algerian presidential election. Authorities arrested 21 individuals and seized 46 firearms, along with ammunition, foreign currency, and GPS devices.

== Ideology ==
MAK claims it is a Kabyle nationalist organization that seeks to achieve the independence of Kabylia through peaceful, non-violent means. Its self-proclaimed goals are to achieve Kabyle independence through political organization, international law, and appeals to democratic norms. It claims its essential values are dignity, respect, pacifism, and solemnity.

=== Human rights ===
MAK denounces the abusive arrests by the Algerian government and the cultural stigmatization of minorities in Algeria.

=== Pro-Israel ===
MAK leader Ferhat Mehenni has long been an outspoken supporter of Israel, drawing comparisons between the Kabyle cause and the Jewish cause. He made a visit to Israel in 2012, met Likud hardliners such as Danny Danon, and took part in a pro-Israel demonstration in Paris in October 2023 amid the Gaza war. The relationship has been described as consistent with Israel's periphery doctrine. In early 2026 members of the Israeli Knesset spoke out in favor of the Kabyle cause and proposed an initiative to study potential Israeli recognition of Kabylian independence. Aksel Bellabbaci, advisor to Mehenni, reacted to the proposal positively and stated that the initiative increased the visibility of the Kabyle cause.

== Organization ==
=== Leadership ===
No	Portrait	Name	Term start	Term end	Time in office	Notes
1		Ferhat Mehenni	24 August 2001	1 June 2010	8 years, 281 days	
2		Mohand-Larbi Tayeb	1 June 2010	5 August 2011	1 year, 65 days	Acting President.
3		Mouloud Mebarki	5 August 2011	9 December 2011	126 days	Acting President.
4		Bouaziz Ait Chebib	9 December 2011	17 November 2016	4 years, 344 days	
5		Ferhat Mehenni	17 November 2016	Incumbent	9 years, 358 days	

== Foreign funding ==
In 2011, a close associate of Ferhat Mehenni and a former senior member of the organisation, Idir Djouder, accused the MAK of receiving funds from Morocco (€250,000 per month) and criticised its management methods. Idir Djouder uses the term "dictator", he describes his "government" and the content of the meetings as formal with decisions taken "elsewhere".

In 2026, Algeria severed diplomatic ties with the United Arab Emirates, accusing the UAE of funding the MAK.

== See also ==
- Berber people
- Politics of Algeria
- Barbacha - A self-governing town in Kabylie.
- Rally for Culture and Democracy (RCD) - The main Liberal Berber party.
- Socialist Forces Front (FFS) - The main Socialist Berber party.
- Arouch Movement - A Kabyle political organization modelled on traditional village councils.
