= Flag of the Movement for the Self-Determination of Kabylia =

Kabylia
- Anay Aqbayli ⴰⵏⴰⵢ ⴰⵇⴱⴰⵢⵍⵉ
- Use: National flag
- Proportion: 3:5
- Adopted: 10 March 2015; 11 years ago
- Design: A vertical bicolour of blue and yellow, charged with a red yaz (ⵣ) at the center and held by two olive branches.

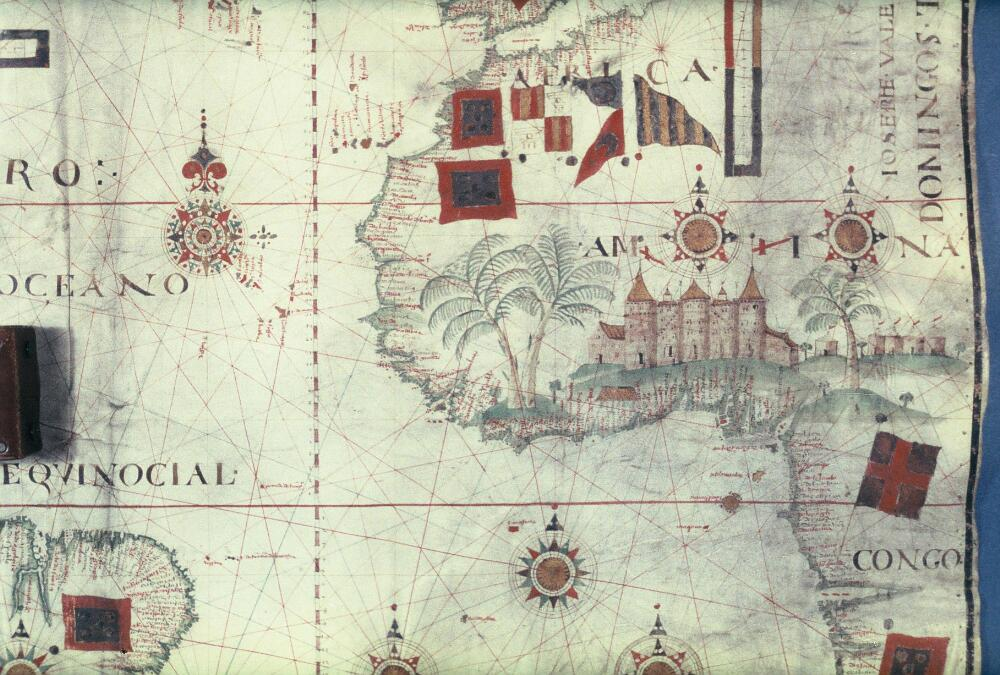
Portion of the Portuguese portolan of the Atlantic, 1570.

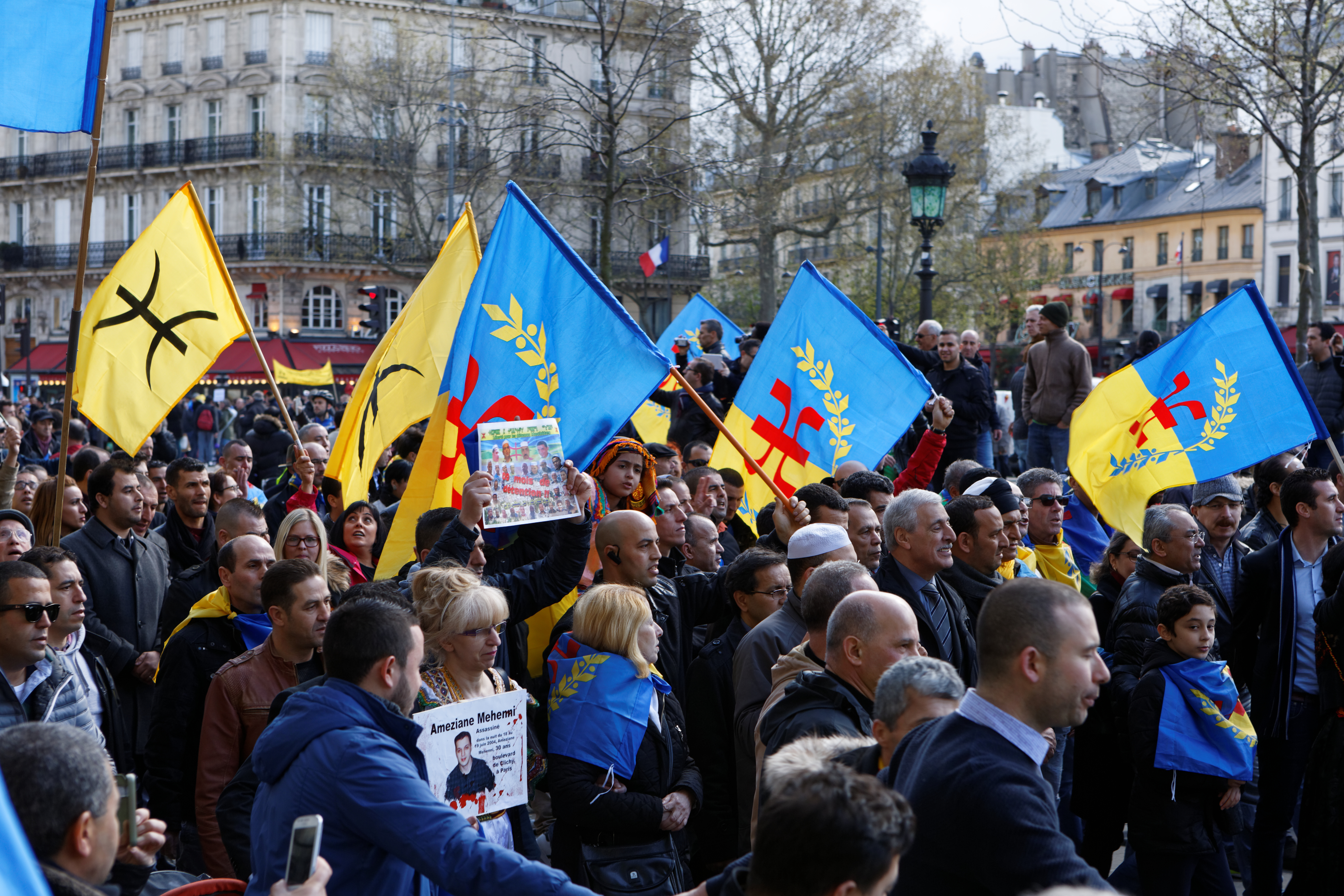
Demonstration by Kabyles in Paris in 2016

The flag of the Movement for the Self-Determination of Kabylia or flag of the Republic of Kabylia (Kabyle: ⴰⵏⴰⵢ ⴰⵇⴱⴰⵢⵍⵉ, Anay Aqbayli) is the flag adopted by the Movement for the Self-Determination of Kabylia for the Republic of Kabylia.

== Origin ==
The flag blue and yellow stripes are inspired from the banner of the Kingdom of Ait Abbas, a modern era Kabyle state whose yellow and blue stripped banner was first described in 1570 in a Portuguese portolan.

== History ==
It was adopted on 10 March 2015 by the Anavad (the self-proclaimed provisional government of Kabylia).

== Symbolism ==
The blue colour symbolises liberty and is referred to as the "azure of liberty", while the yellow colour is defined as the "yellow of Kabylia" and represents the land of Kabylia itself.

In the centre is a red aza (ⵣ), a symbol of the Berber cultural movement, held by two olive branches. The red colour represents life and the desire to serve the fatherland. The olive branches represent the attachment of the Kabyle people to the olive tree, regarded as the "nourishing tree". Their symbolism was subsequently developed by Ferhat Mehenni, who described the olive tree as a representation of peace, while its fruits symbolise the fertility of the Kabyle land and the "genius of Kabylia".

The two olive branches are depicted in alternating colours, with the yellow branch placed on the blue field and the blue branch placed on the yellow field. This inversion of colours symbolises the relationship between Kabylia and liberty: Kabylia is protected by liberty (blue on yellow), while liberty is protected by Kabylia (yellow on blue).

== Colour specification ==
The colours of the flag are blue, yellow and red.

Scheme	Blue	Yellow	Red
RAL	—	—	—
Pantone	300 C	7405 C	199 C
RGB	0–101–189	242–206–0	220–20–60
CMYK	100–47–0–26	0–15–100–5	0–91–73–14
HTML	#0065BD	#F2CD00	#DC143C

== See also ==
- Berber flag
