= Kabyle.com =

- Website type: News
- Available in: French, Kabyle, English, Catalan, Spanish
- Founded: 1999
- Headquarters: Lyon, France
- Owner: Stéphane Arrami
- Founder: Stéphane Arrami
- Website: kabyle.com
- Commercial: No
- Current status: Active

Kabyle.com is a French news website created in 1999 by Stéphane Arrami. The site operates as an independent online media outlet publishing content related to Kabylia and the Amazigh world in 5 different languages.
