= Haut commissariat à l'amazighité =

Algerian government department

The Haut commissariat à l'amazighité (English: High Commission for Amazighity; Arabic: المحافظة السامية للأمازيغية; Tamazight: ⵙⵇⴰⵎⵓ ⵓⵏⵏⵉⴳ ⵏ ⵜⵉⵎⵓⵣⵖⴰ) is a government department in Algeria overseeing the Berber (Amazigh) sphere.

== History ==
It is an academic institute of the Algerian state responsible for the study and promotion of the Amazigh language in Algeria. It was created by presidential decree on May 27, 1995, under the mandate of the President Liamine Zeroual. It is the first official institute in the Maghreb dedicated to Berber culture and language. It has been directly attached to the presidency of the Republic since its creation in 1995.

It is headquartered in Algiers.

In the 1990s, Berber identity movements continued to advocate for greater political participation and the recognition of Tamazight, the standardized version of the Berber dialects, which had been codified in the meantime, as an official language in Algeria. During the 1994-1995 academic year, a period known as the "white year" or "blank year," a widespread school boycott took place, particularly among Berber families in Kabylia. This movement ultimately persuaded President Liamine Zeroual to establish the High Commission for Amazighity (HCA) in 1995. The HCA was tasked with promoting Tamazight and incorporating its use into the school systems of certain regions, as well as in communication platforms. The following year, in 1996, Algeria's new Constitution acknowledged "Islam, Arabicness, and Amazighness" as fundamental elements of the nation's identity in its preamble. However, Tamazight was not recognized as an official language, remaining excluded from government use and official contexts. This changed in 2002, following the Black Spring, when Tamazight was declared a national language. In 2016, it gained the status of an official language of Algeria. Shortly after, on December 27, 2017, the Algerian Academy of Amazigh Language was established to support its development and promotion.

Its missions are diverse and range from the study of the central component of Algerian society: the Berber (or Amazigh) identity, to the promotion of the teaching of the Berber language (Tamazight) in schools. It is also a publisher of books on Berber culture in general.

The HCA has achieved numerous findings for Berber languages and cultures in Algeria, including in particular:

- The integration of Tamazight into the primary, middle and secondary education system in different regions of Algeria.
- The training of hundreds of university professors.
- Launch of Berber-language news programs on public television channels.
- The creation of a Berber-language public television channel: Channel 4.
- The use of Berber languages in the Algerian parliament.
- The officialization of Tamazight in Algeria.
- The creation of a degree in Berber languages.
- The creation of the Algerian Academy of Amazigh Language.

In 2023, the Haut commissariat à l'amazighité recommended the generalization of mandatory Amazigh education to all Algerian schools.

== Presidents ==
- Mohand Idir Aït Amrane: 27 may 1995 – 30 october 2004;
- Youcef Merrahi : 30 october 2004 – 2016.
- El Hachemi Assad: from 2016.

== See also ==
- Berberism
- Berber Academy
- Algerian Academy of Amazigh Language
- Royal Institute of Amazigh Culture
