= Algerian Academy of Amazigh Language =

- Formation: 27 December 2017
- Headquarters: Algiers, Algeria
- Members: 50 members known as les immortels (the immortals)
- Website: el-mouradia.dz

The Algerian Academy of the Amazigh Language (Berber languages: ⵜⴰⴽⴰⴷⵉⵎⵉⵜ ⵜⴰⵣⵣⴰⵢⵔⵉⵜ ⵏ ⵜⵓⵜⵍⴰⵢⵜ ⵜⴰⵎⴰⵣⵉⵖⵜ, romanized: Takadimit Tazzayrit n Tutlayt Tamaziɣt) is the pre-eminent Algerian council for matters pertaining to the Amazigh language (also known as the Berber language), including Standard Algerian Berber. The academy was officially established on 27 December 2017, by the former president of Algeria Abdelaziz Bouteflika.

== History ==
The President of Algeria Abdelaziz Bouteflika before the Council of Ministers meeting on 27 December 2017, had mandated its Prime Minister Ahmed Ouyahia to implement the directives issued.

Thus, Ahmed Ouyahia had convened and chaired an interministerial council on 8 January 2018, devoted to the revitalization of Tamazight's teaching and the preparation of the organic bill for the creation of an Algerian Academy of the Amazigh language.

This interministerial council had resulted in a series of measures, including the allocation of additional budget posts, to strengthen the teaching of Tamazight in the Algerian education system, and to expand training and research in Tamazight at the level of Algerian universities.

In addition, an interministerial working group would be set up at the Prime Minister's Office to work on the preparation of a draft bill for the creation of this Language Academy.

This text will follow the usual course at the level of the Government and the Council of Ministers before reaching the Algerian Parliament in the first half of 2018.

== See also ==
- Academy of Sciences
- Berberism
- Berber Academy
- Berber calendar
- Berber flag
- Haut-Conseil à l'amazighité
- Language Council
- List of language regulators
- Tifinagh
- World Amazigh Congress
