= Belaïd Abrika =

Algerian professor

- Belɛid Abṛika
- Born: 10 December 1969; Tizi-Ouzou
- Citizenship: Algerian
- Education: University of Tizi Ouzou
- Movement: Berber Cultural Movement

Belaïd Abrika (Kabyle: Belɛid Abṛika, born December 10, 1969, in Tizi Ouzou) is a professor of economics at the Mouloud Mammeri University of Tizi-Ouzou. He has become one of the best-known modern Kabyles through his role as a leader and spokesperson of the Arouch (Comité des Âarouchs, Daïras et communes or CADC) protest movement in the region of Kabylie in Algeria.

He has been arrested several times because of his association with Arouch. In September 2003 he was arrested and beaten by police during a protest of recent government actions to suppress independent newspapers. On August 10, 2004, Abrika was arrested again by Tizi-Ouzou police during a protest at a hospital. He was imprisoned for 28 days.

In November 2022, he was sentenced to one year in prison for commemorating the Berber Spring and the Black Spring.
