= Ramdane Haifi =

Ramdane Haïfi
- Born: 1948; Larbaâ Nath Irathen, Algeria
- Died: 24 February 2007 (aged about 59)

Ramdane Haïfi (1948 – February 24, 2007), also known as Ramdane Imazighen and Dda Ramdane, was an Algerian-French Berber nationalist activist. He was born in Ifnayen, Larbaâ Nath Irathen, and was instrumental in the establishment of the Berber Academy alongside Mohammed Arav Bessaoud. He later became the owner of the Ighuraf Imazighen, a Berber hotel-restaurant in eastern Paris, and was assassinated in 2007 by a tenant who didn't pay his rent.
