= Hamid Lounaouci =

Algerian politician (1955–2026)

- حميد لوناوسي

Minister of Transport
- In office 24 December 1999 – 31 May 2001
- President: Abdelaziz Bouteflika
- Prime Minister: Ahmed Benbitour; Ali Benflis
- Preceded by: Sayed Ahmed Bouleil
- Succeeded by: Salim Saadi

Member of the People's National Assembly
- In office 5 June 1997 – 24 December 1999

Personal details
- Born: 3 April 1955 Tizi Ouzou, French Algeria
- Died: 8 October 2026 (aged 71) Algiers, Algeria
- Party: RCD
- Occupation: Civil servant

Hamid Lounaouci (Arabic: حميد لوناوسي; 3 April 1955 – 8 October 2026) was an Algerian politician of the Rally for Culture and Democracy (RCD).

Elected to the People's National Assembly in 1997, he was appointed Minister of Transport on 24 December 1999. He was dismissed from the post in 2001 while his brother, Mouloud Lounaouci, supported opposition candidate Saïd Sadi in the 2004 presidential election. Hamid resigned from the RCD in November 2008 and signed a 2011 petition in support of General Khaled Nezzar, on trial in Switzerland for crimes against humanity. In 2021, he became a counsellor for President Abdelmadjid Tebboune, overseeing NGOs.

Lounaouci died in Algiers on 8 October 2026, at the age of 71.
