= Mustapha Anane =

Algerian footballer (1950-2010)

Personal information
- Full name: Mustapha Anane
- Date of birth: 1950
- Place of birth: Larbaâ Nath Irathen, Algeria
- Date of death: 21 October 2010 (aged 60)
- Place of death: Tizi Ouzou, Algeria
- Positions: Forward; midfielder

Youth career
- 1964–1968: JS Kabylie

Senior career*
Years	Team	Apps	(Gls)
1968–1980	JS Kabylie	-	(-)

International career
	Algeria	2	(0)
- * Club domestic league appearances and goals

Mustapha Anane (1950, in Larbaâ Nath Irathen – October 21, 2010), was a former Algerian international footballer who spent his entire career with JS Kabylie.

== Personal ==
Anane was born in the town of Larbaâ Nath Irathen and grew up in the Lalla Saïda district of Tizi Ouzou, where he started playing football in the streets of his neighborhood.

== Club career ==
At age 14, Anane joined the junior ranks of JS Kabylie. Four years later, the coach of the senior team, Ali Ben Fedda, promoted him into the squad where he made his debut in a friendly against Soviet side Dinamo Minsk. He made his official debut for the club in a match against ES Guelma, where he scored two goals in a 3–2 loss. Anane was a member of the JSK team that won promotion to the top flight in 1969. He went on to win the league title four times during his time with the club : 1973, 1974, 1977 and 1980. In 1977, he won the Algerian Cup beating NA Hussein Dey in the final and in 1973 he won the Algerian Super Cup beating MC Alger in the final.

In 1980, Anane played his last game for JSK against AS Vita Club in the 1978 African Cup of Champions Clubs. He decided to retire after that due to an injury he had picked up during a friendly in France. He continued playing in the local amateur league with AS Tizi Ouzou, which he would also go on to coach.

== International career ==
Despite being a regular member of the Algerian National Team, Anane had just two caps for the team, playing in friendlies against Hungary and Albania.

== Managerial career ==
After his playing career, Anane coached the junior and senior teams of local club AS Tizi Ouzou, as well as other clubs in the Kabylie region such as Les Issers, and his birthplace, Larbaâ Nath Irathen. He then became a manager with JS Kabylie and was also in charge of the junior team.

== Death ==
On October 21, 2010, Anane died in the early hours of the day at Tizi Ouzou. He was buried the same day in the town's M'douha Cemetery.

== Honours ==
- Won the Algerian Championnat National four times with JS Kabylie in 1973, 1974, 1977, 1980
- Won the Algerian Cup once with JS Kabylie in 1977
- Won the Algerian Super Cup once with JS Kabylie in 1973
