= Standardized Berber =

Standardized Berber may refer to:

- Standard Moroccan Amazigh
- Standard Algerian Berber
