= Black Spring (Algeria) =

Series of protests and demonstrations

- Part of the Algerian Civil War
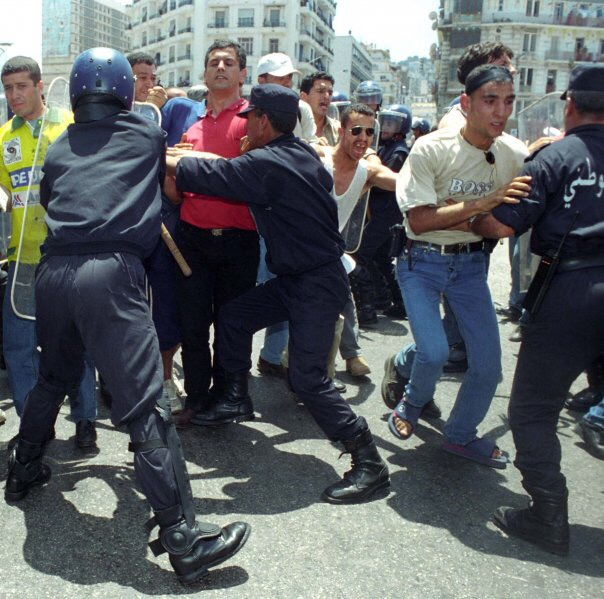
- Date: 20 April 2001 – 14 June 2001
- Location: Kabylia
- Caused by: Marginalization of Kabyle people; Murder of Massinissa Guermah
- Methods: Demonstrations
- Result: Government concedes to Kabyle demands: Constitution amended; Gendarmerie Nationale withdrawn from Kabylie; Berber languages recognized as a national language; Barbacha gains de facto autonomy from the Algerian state; Foundation of the MAK

Parties
Kabyles; Arouch Movement; RCD; FFS	Algeria; RND; MSP; FLN; Armed Forces

Lead figures
Belaïd Abrika; Ferhat Mehenni; Saïd Sadi; Hocine Aït Ahmed	Abdelaziz Bouteflika; Ali Benflis; Mohamed Lamari

Casualties and losses
126 killed Thousands injured Thousands arrested	

The Black Spring (Kabyle: Tafsut Taberkant) was a series of protests and political demonstrations by Kabyle activists in the Kabylie region of Algeria in 2001, which were met by repressive and violent police measures and became a potent symbol of Kabyle discontent with the national government. The protests took place against a backdrop of long-standing cultural marginalization of the Highlander Kabyle, a homogeneous Berber linguistic group in Algeria (Berber speakers form some 25%–35% of the total population, although exact numbers are disputed) despite the most rigid government-sponsored Arabization measures of the 1960s through the 1980s having been lifted. The name "Black Spring" alludes to the events known as the Berber Spring of the 1980s, in which mainly Kabyle civil society activists challenged the ban on Berber culture then in place, demanding cultural rights and democracy.

== Events ==
Guermah, at the time before his murder.

In 2001, a young Kabyle student, Massinissa Guermah, was arrested by Algerian gendarmes and later died inside the gendarmerie. This provoked large-scale riots in the Kabyle region, that lasted for months.

President Abdelaziz Bouteflika's government claimed that the real name of Massinissa was in fact Karim and that he was a jobless criminal aged 26. Several months after these statements, the government admitted that his real name was in fact Massinissa (named after the historical Berber king of ancient Algeria), and that he was an innocent high school student. The Minister of the Interior Yazid Zerhouni said that he "was badly informed". No apologies were given to the victim's family, however, and the riots did not stop. Bouteflika's government maintained that the Kabyles were being "manipulated by a foreign hand".

== Victims ==
As of April 2001 (few days after the beginning of the black spring) there were 43 young Kabyles killed. As of July 2001, there were 267 young people shot by bullets, of which 50 died (18,7%). The Issad commission notes that "It is only comparable to military losses in very tough battles during war time, The security forces, at the same time and at the same place do not present any wounded man by bullets, nor anyone killed by bullets."

As of April 2002, the Algerian Human Rights League reports 128 Kabyles killed, 5000 wounded of which 200 have become permanently disabled, and thousands of arrests, bad treatment, torture and arbitrary detentions.

At the end of the Black Spring events, the Algerian press reported 128 Kabyles were killed, and thousands were severely injured in the riots, or tortured by the Gendarmerie paramilitaries.

== Results ==
In the end, Bouteflika agreed to some of the Kabyle demands. Gendarmes were withdrawn from Kabylie, and the Berber language (Tamazight) was made a "national language" in the 2002 Algerian Constitution (but not an "official" language, on par with Arabic, until 2016).

The traditional Berber political parties, Saïd Sadi's liberal Rally for Culture and Democracy (RCD) and Hocine Aït Ahmed's socialist Front of Socialist Forces (FFS), were partly marginalized by the radical grass-roots activism and violent forms of protest. Instead, new movements rose to the fore in Kabyle politics: the Arush (Arouch) movement and the Movement for the Autonomy of Kabylie (MAK), whose regionalist ambitions for autonomy marked a new evolution in Kabyle politics.

The region of Barbacha has managed to gain a significant degree of autonomy, giving hope to many Kabylie activists.

== See also ==
- List of modern conflicts in North Africa
