= 1995 Algerian presidential election =

Election of Liamine Zéroual

- 16 November 1995
- Registered: 15,969,904
- Turnout: 75.69%
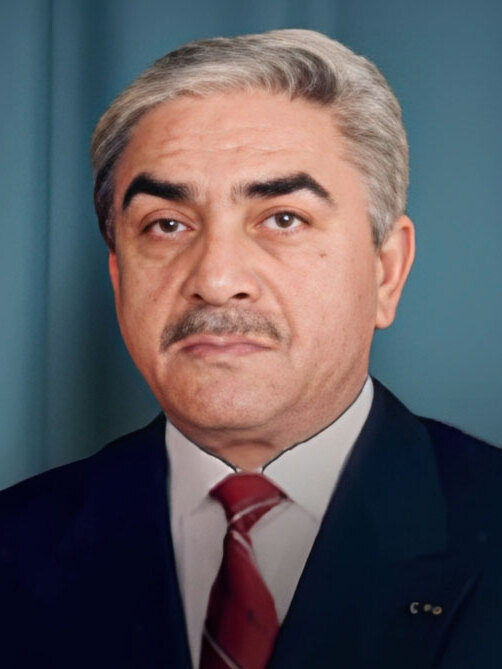

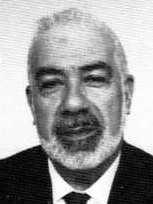

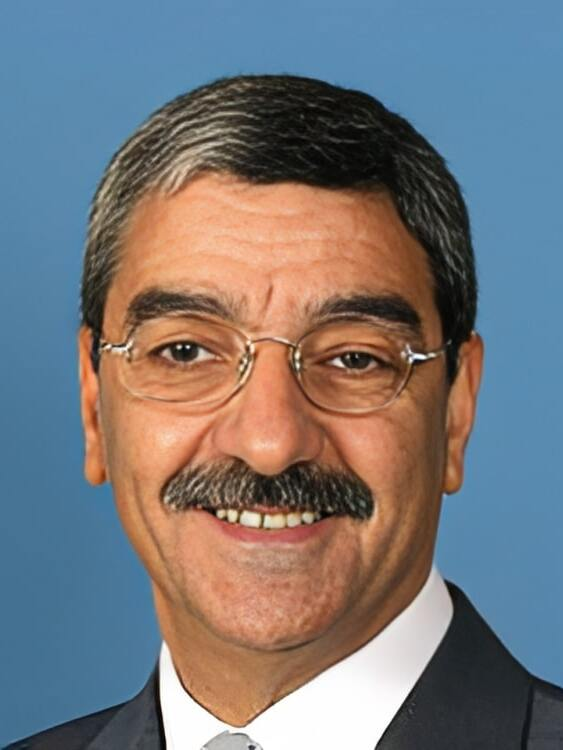
Nominee	Liamine Zéroual	Mahfoud Nahnah	Saïd Sadi
Party	Independent	MSP	RCD
Popular vote	7,088,618	2,971,974	1,115,796
Percentage	61.01%	25.58%	9.60%
President before election
Liamine Zéroual
Independent
Elected President
Liamine Zéroual
Independent

Presidential elections were held in Algeria on 16 November 1995, in the midst of the Algerian Civil War. The result was a victory for Liamine Zeroual, head of the High Council of State at the time, who won 61% of the vote. The Armed Islamic Group of Algeria threatened to kill anyone who voted, with the slogan "one vote, one bullet", but official voter turnout was 76%.

The election took place amid boycotts by opposition parties and death threats from Islamic militants.

== Candidates ==
- Liamine Zeroual, independent
- Mahfoud Nahnah, candidate of the Islamist Movement of Society for Peace (MSP)
- Said Sadi, candidate of the secularist Rally for Culture and Democracy
- Noureddine Boukrouh, candidate of the Party of Algerian Renewal (PRA)

== Conduct ==
Delegations of observers came from the Arab League, the African Union, and the United Nations, and reported no major problems. The Armed Islamic Group had threatened to kill voters, but the elections passed with few attacks. Voter turnout was high, despite the three largest parties of the 1991 parliamentary elections (the Islamic Salvation Front, National Liberation Front and Socialist Forces Front) calling for a boycott.

== Results ==
Candidate	Party	Votes	%
Liamine Zéroual	Independent	7,088,618	61.01
Mahfoud Nahnah	Movement of Society for Peace	2,971,974	25.58
Saïd Sadi	Rally for Culture and Democracy	1,115,796	9.60
Noureddine Boukrouh	Party of Algerian Renewal	443,144	3.81
Total		11,619,532	100.00
Valid votes		11,619,532	96.13
Invalid/blank votes		467,749	3.87
Total votes		12,087,281	100.00
Registered voters/turnout		15,969,904	75.69
Source: Algeria Official Journal
