= Kabyle Government in Exile =

Kabyle government-in-exile based in France

Kabyle Government in Exile Anavaḍ Aqvayli di Verra ⴰⵏⴰⵠⴰⴹ ⴰⵇⵠⴰⵢⵍⵉ ⴷⵉ ⵠⴻⵔⵔⴰ
- Flag Emblem
- Motto: Taqvaylit Tezwar Ayen Yellan ⵝⴰⵇⴲⴰⵢⵍⵉⵝ ⵝⴻⵣⵡⴰⵔ ⴰⵢⴻⵏ ⵢⴻⵍⵍⴰⵏ "Kabylia first, above all"
- Anthem: Ass n Tlelli ⴰⵙⵙ ⵏ ⵝⵉⵍⴻⵍⵍⵉ "The Freedom Day"
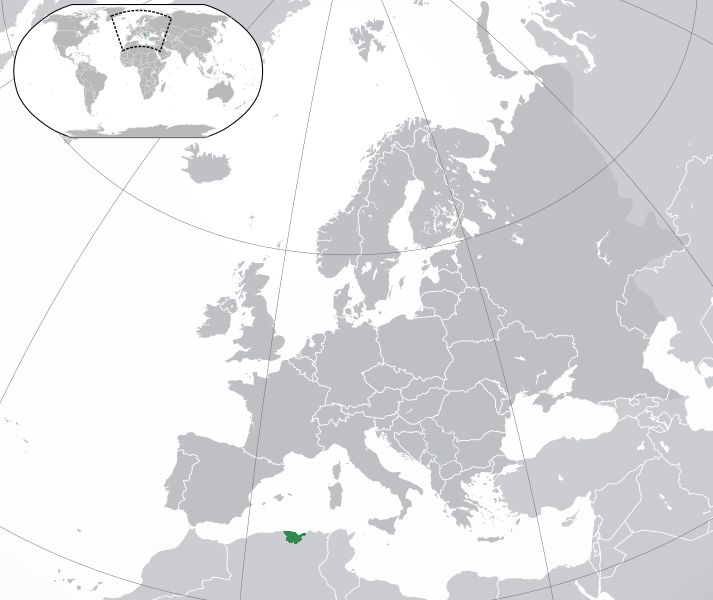
- Territory claimed by the Government in Exile.
- Status: Government-in-exile
- Capital-in-exile: Paris, France
- Official languages: Kabyle (de jure)
- Demonym: Kabyle
- Government: Government-in-exile
  - President: Ferhat Mehenni
  - Prime Minister: Hanafi Ferhouh
  - President of the Imni: Hamid At Ali Ukadi
- Legislature: Parliament (Imni)
  - Upper house: Senate
- Establishment: June 1, 2010
  - Declaration of Independence: December 14, 2025

Area
  - Total: 25,452 km^{2} (9,827 sq mi) (Claimed territory)
- Website kabylie-gouv.org

The Kabyle Government in Exile (Kabyle: Anavaḍ Aqvayli di Verra, ⴰⵏⴰⵠⴰⴹ ⴰⵇⵠⴰⵢⵍⵉ ⴷⵉ ⵠⴻⵔⵔⴰ), also known as the Anavad is a self-proclaimed provisional government in the form of an association formed in Paris by the Movement for the Autonomy of Kabylia in 2010 and aimed at declaring the independence of Kabylia.

On 14 December 2025, Ferhat Mehenni, president of the government in exile, symbolically declared the independence of Kabylia. The date chosen is a reference to the Declaration on the Granting of Independence to Colonial Countries and Peoples adopted by the United Nations General Assembly on 14 December 1960.

Kabylia is a mountainous region, located east of Algiers, and is a traditional center of conflict. The Kabyles, who speak Kabyle (a Tamazight language), have been campaigning since the independence of Algeria for the recognition of their language and their culture.

== History ==
A provisional government advocating the self-determination of Kabylia was formed on the evening of June 1, 2010 in Paris, "to no longer suffer injustice, contempt and domination by the government of Algiers." In a press release, Ferhat Mehenni, the president of the Movement for the Self-Determination of Kabylia (MAK), claimed that "Denied in our existence, flouted in our dignity, discriminated against on all levels, we have been denied our identity, our language, and our Kabyle culture, robbed of our natural resources, we are, to this day, administered like colonized people, even foreigners in Algeria.” He added that "Today, if we are setting up our provisional government, it is so as not to endure the injustice, contempt, domination, frustrations and discrimination that we have endured since 1962."

The Kabyle Provisional Government was then composed of a president and nine ministers, two women and seven men, from the three sub-regions of Kabylia. However, following a deep disagreement with the president who was accused of slowing down ministerial actions, the Minister of the Budget, Minister of Health and Solidarity, Minister of the Interior, and Minister for Relations with the society all resigned. A 5th minister resigned following Mehenni's election as President of MAK France. The chief of staff of the presidency was also sacked by Mehenni.

On August 15, 2010, the High Council of the Kabyle Diaspora (HCDK) was formed by the presidency of the Anavad in order to safeguard the moral and material interests of the Kabyle diaspora as well as to conduct censuses and sociological, historical, economic and cultural studies concerning the Kabyle diaspora and to organize and raise awareness among, and mobilize the Kabyle diaspora in support of the Anavad and Arezki Bakir was nominated as its President.

In September 2010, the Kabyle agency of information SIWEL is created and Tahar Maddi is nominated as its president.

In May 2012, the Kabyle National Solidarity Fund (FNSK) is created and Said Serir is nominated as its President. In 2016, Mourad Itim became the new president of the FNSK.

The Kabyle Provisional Government was admitted on August 31, 2013 as a full member of the Organization of Emerging African States (OEAS), an American NGO based in Washington.

On 28 December 2013, Yennayer was declared as the New Year in Kabylia.

On August 26, 2021, Algeria issued an international arrest warrant for Ferhat Mehenni.

== Governments ==
=== Presidents ===
The president is elected for a five-year term in a universal suffrage. The first election was held on December 9, 2011, during which the 2nd congress of the MAK elected Ferhat Mehenni. Ferhat Mehenni was re-elected on February 26, 2016 for a four-year term, by the 3rd congress of the MAK. No other election was held after 2016.

#	Portrait	Name	President From	President Until	Political Party
1		Ferhat Mehenni	4 June 2010	Incumbent	MAK

=== Cabinets ===
In June and July 2010, after the creation of the government, members of the government are nominated by the President:

- Idir Djouder – Minister of Budget, Economy and Sustainable Development
- Djamila Amgoud – Minister of Culture
- Malika At Sɛid Waɛmer – Minister of Health and Solidarity
- Mouloud Merhab – Minister of Mediation and Relations of the Anavad with the Civil Society
- Makhlouf Idri – Minister of Youth and Sports
- Dahmen At Ali – General Secretary

In September 2010, Brigitte Tanina Jacob is nominated as the Chief of Staff to the Minister for International Relations.

==== Ziani cabinet (2016–2021) ====
This government was formed on August 16, 2016.

- Lhacène Ziani – Prime Minister
- Ahmed Haddag – Minister for Institutions and Security
- Sakina Ait Ahmed – Minister for the Kabyle Language and Culture
- Amar Nessah – Minister for Solidarity
- Tahar Ait Abdeslam – Minister for Economy and Sustainable Development
- Nora Abdaoui – Minister for Human Rights

==== Lafdal cabinet (2017–2023) ====
In 2017, the Lafdal government was appointed as an hybrid structure combining ministerial functions and institutional project management.

On February 20, 2021, the government was reshuffled and many ministers were created:

Government

- Zidane Lafdal – Prime Minister
- Aksel Ameziane – Minister for International Relations and Government Spokesperson
- Ravah Cerifi – Minister for Laɛnaya (Solidarity)
- Azwaw At Qasi – Minister of Institutions
- Hamu At Ali – Minister of Education and the Kabyle School
- Assa At Imlul – Minister responsible for Relations with Parliament
- Muqran At Sɣir – Minister of Economy and Finance
- Munir At Seɛu – Minister of Communication
- Augustin Imerzugen – Secretary of State to the Minister of Communication

Prime Minister's Office

- Mathias Hmituc – Chief of Staff
- Vaz At Vrahem – Director in charge of Digital Resources
- Muqran At Ccix – Director in charge of Census Projects and the Referendum on Kabyle Self-Determination
- Murad Itim – Director in charge of the Kabyle Constitution Project and Administrative & Socio-Political Reorganization
- Nordine Larab – Project Director of the Kabyle Economic, Social and Environmental Council (CESEK)

==== Ferhouh cabinet (2023–) ====
In 2023, Hanafi Ferhouh was appointed as the Prime Minister of the Anavad.

In 2024, the government was reshuffled.

Government

- Hanafi Ferhouh – Prime Minister
- LMulud At Ʃazdin – Government Spokesperson and Secretary of State for Media Presence and Promotion
- Mounir Boutegrabet – Minister of the Interior
- Hemmu At Ali – Minister of Education and Training
- Allas At Hemmu – Minister of Solidarity
- Rachida Ider – Minister of the Kabyle Language and Culture
- Hamid Ouanes – Minister of Citizen Affairs and Head of the Government Strategy Unit
- Tafat Ugafa – Minister of Legal Affairs and Human Rights
- Yugurten At Musssa – Minister of Sustainable Planning and Strategic Data

Prime Minister's Office

- Reza At Sɛid – Chief of Staff
- Dyhia Tilelli – Head of Performance and Policy Coordination Unit
- Amayas Aqvayli – Head of Political Training Unit
- Ferhat Halliche – Head of Information and Communication Unit
- Hasan At Aɛmaṛ Waɛli – Special Advisor to the Prime Minister
- Karim Achab – Head of Foreign Affairs

== Parliament ==
Imni ⵉⵎⵏⵉ
- 2nd legislature

Type
- Type: Unicameral

History
- Founded: 14 June 2020

Structure
- Length of term: 5 years

The Parliament (Imni) is the unicameral parliament of the Kabyle Federal Republic. Members of the Imni are elected through universal suffrage for a five-year term. Hamid At Ali Ukadi is its acting president.

=== History ===
The Imni was founded on 14 June 2020 by Ferhat Mehenni. Its first legislature started on the day of its foundation and ended in 2023. The second legislature started in 2023 and ended on 27 June 2026.

== See also ==
- Movement for the Self-Determination of Kabylia
