= 2021 Algeria wildfires =

2021 fire season in Algeria

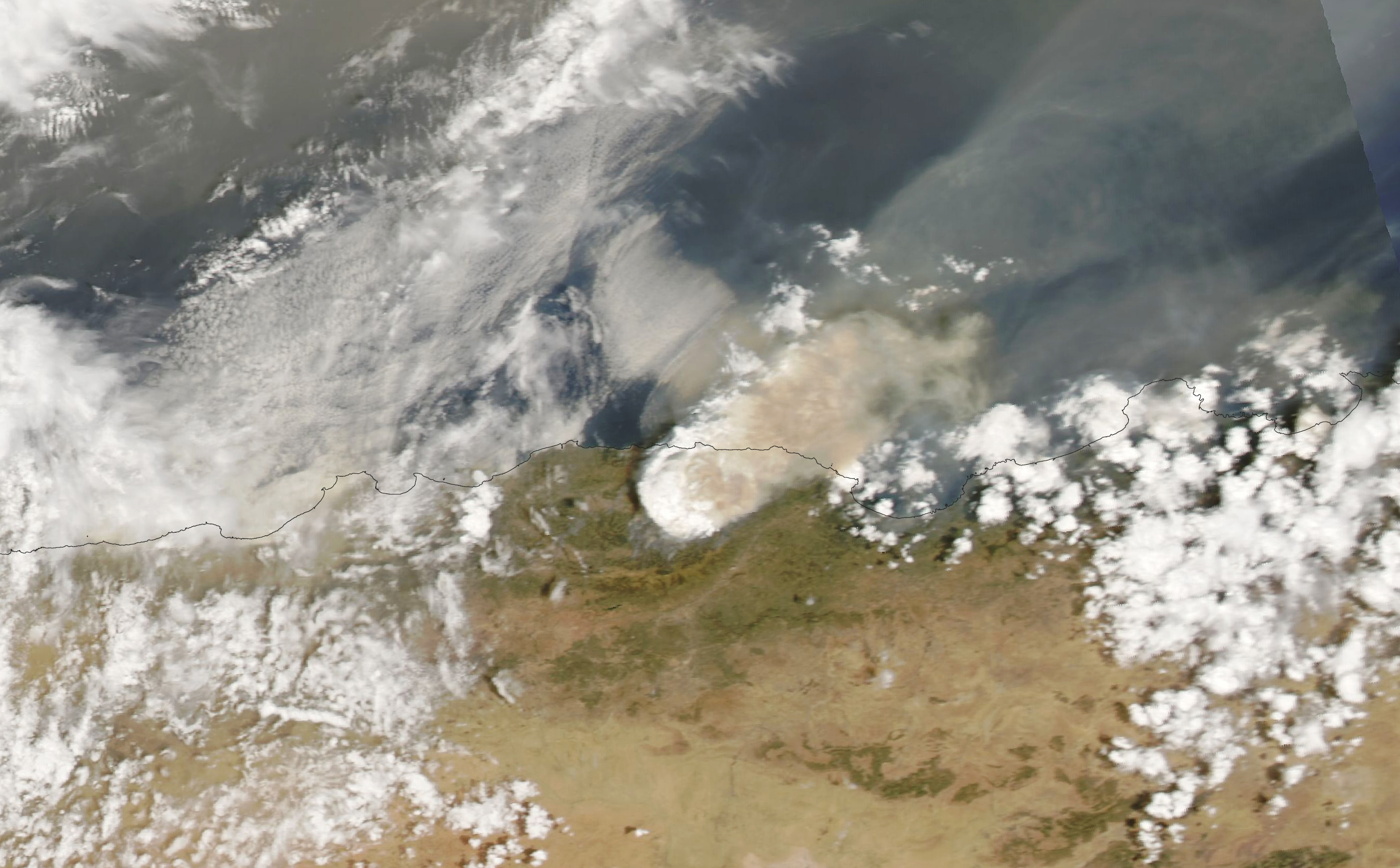
- Plumes of smoke over northern Algeria on August 11, 2021
- Date: June – October 2021
- Location: Kabylia region, Algeria

Impacts
- Deaths: 90 (57 civilians and 33 soldiers)

Ignition
- Cause: Unknown
- Perpetrator: Movement for the Self-Determination of Kabylie (per Algerian authorities)

The 2021 Algeria wildfires were multiple wildfires that happened in the Kabylia region of Algeria since 9 August 2021, which have killed 90 people, including 57 civilians and 33 soldiers. The soldiers died after being trapped in the blaze during rescue operations.

On 9 August, many fires started up in the Kabylia region and elsewhere, and Algerian authorities sent soldiers to help citizens with the blazes and evacuations.

On 10 August, multiple fires burned Mediterranean trees, destroying olive trees and killing cattle and chickens. Many distant villages have very limited water. Some villagers fled, while others tried to hold back the flames themselves, using buckets, branches and rudimentary tools, due to the unavailability of firefighting aircraft.

On 12 August, President Abdelmadjid Tebboune said in a live speech on state television that "criminal hands were behind most" of the fires and that 22 people have been arrested.

After 7 days following the appearance of the wildfires, Civil Protection units have successfully extinguished 41 forest fires in nine provinces in the past 24 hours, and complete extinction of fires in Annaba was reported.

On 17 August, all forest fires in Jijel and Sétif were extinguished.

On 18 August, the President's Office said that "ultimate responsibility" for fires lay with the Islamist Rachad group and MAK, an ethnopolitical autonomy organization that aims to split the ethnic Berber region of Kabyle from the rest of Algeria, with "support and help from foreign parties, particularly Morocco and the Zionist entity", referring to Israel.

The 2021 Algerian-Israeli naval incident took place during these wildfires on 27 September.

== Casualties ==
A report from Sonelgaz revealed that a total of 610 km (380 mi) of electricity network and no less than 710 stations were destroyed by fires in Tizi Ouzou Province. The Local Direction of Agricultural Services (DSA) reported that 5,193 hectares of fruit trees and 19,178 farm animals were burned. Engineers from the Technical Construction Control body (CTC) appraised 1,705 homes damaged by the fires.

In May 2022, the Algerian Directorate General of Forests (DGF) reported that over 100,000 hectares (250,000 acres) of vegetation were affected by fires in the summer of 2021, with 1,631 fire outbreaks recorded across 21 wilayas. The breakdown of the affected areas is as follows:

- Forests: 260,135 hectares (642,810 acres) (26% of the total area)
- Bushes: 21,040 hectares (52,000 acres) (21.5%)
- Scrub: 16,415 hectares (40,560 acres) (16.5%)
- Fruit Trees: 16,160 hectares (39,900 acres) (36%)
- Esparto: 352 hectares (870 acres) (0.5%)

Affected area by outbreaks
Wilaya	Outbreaks
Tizi Ouzou	241
Jijel	164
Skikda	125
Bejaia	112
Tipasa	97
Bouira	86
El Tarf	82
Médéa	66
Boumerdes	63
Oum El Bouaghi	56

Affected area by hectares
Wilaya	Hectares
Tizi Ouzou	43,398
Bejaia	13,174
Khenchela	9,837
Guelma	5,927
El Tarf	5,090
Annaba	5,024

== Killing of Djamel Ben Ismail ==
Djamel Ben Ismail, an artist and social activist from Miliana, was brutally killed by a mob days after the fires began in Tizi Ouzou. He was initially accused of arson without substantiation.

A video showing the assault against Ben Ismail went viral online, showing his final minutes as he was burned alive and killed for his alleged role. However, social media users identified him as a prominent artist who was present in the area to help residents put out the fires.

In the video, Ben Ismail was pleading with the mob, repetitively insisting that he had no role in the wildfires. Several members of the group were shouting racist and insulting slang at the victim, such as sale arabe, which is French for dirty Arab. It is believed that several members of this mob appearing in the footage are affiliated with the MAK, an organization accused by Algerian authorities as having separatist aims and an anti-Arab sentiment. Due to this, it is strongly believed that Ben Ismail was in fact guiltless.

The Directorate General for National Security (DGSN) affirmed the arrest of 36 suspects, including 3 women, involved in Ben Ismail's assassination and lynching in Larbaâ Nath Irathen, Tizi Ouzou. On 17 August, the DGSN released a video including confessions from new suspects arrested in connection with the case. The criminal court of Dar El Beida sentenced 49 people to death for the homicide and mutilation of Ben Ismail.

== See also ==
- 2022 Moroccan wildfires
