= Barbacha =

Barbacha Iberbacen (Kabyle)
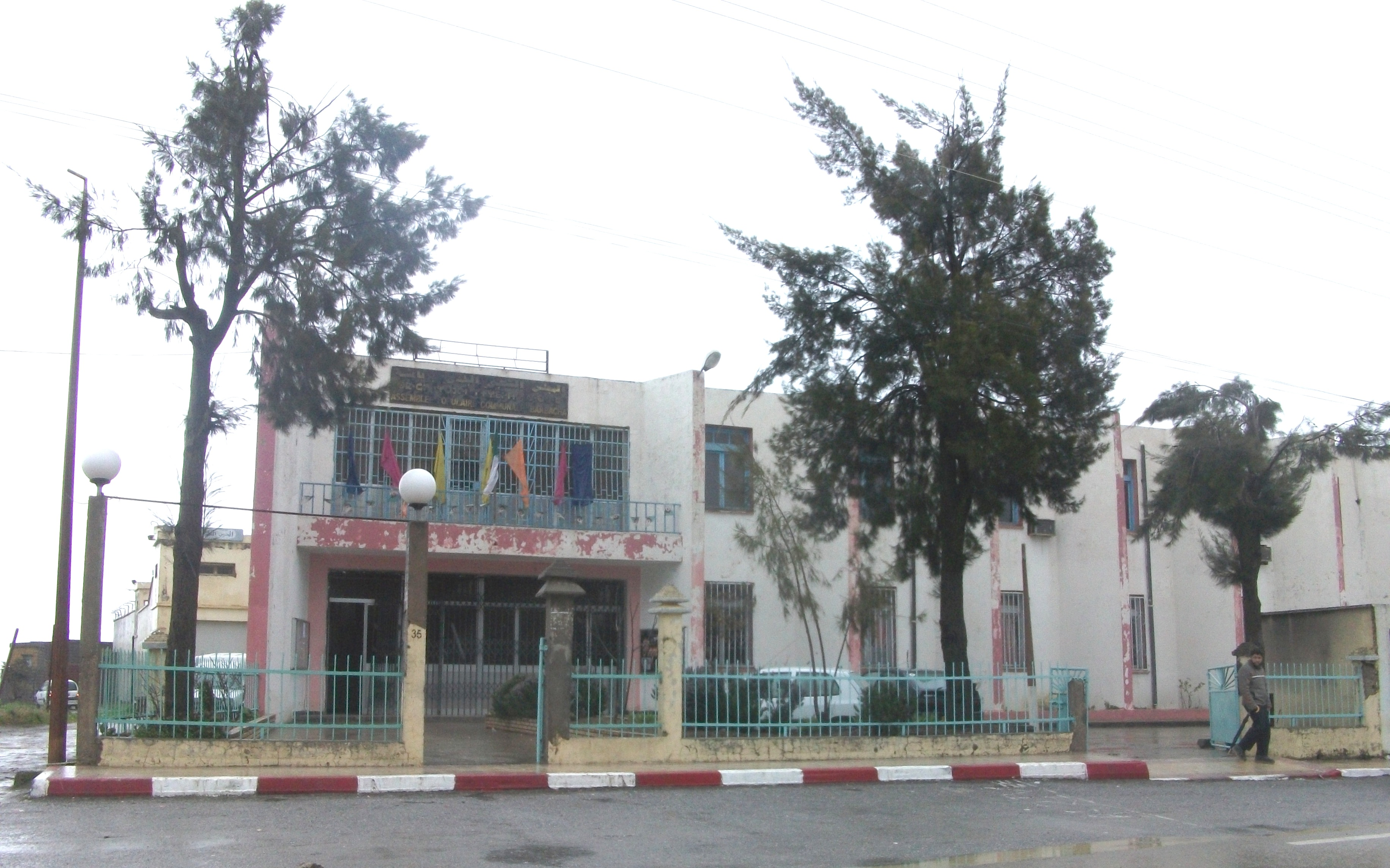

- Location within Algeria
- Coordinates: 36°34′N 4°58′E
- Country: Algeria
- Region: Kabylia
- Province: Bejaia

Population (2012)
  - Total: 27,000
- Time zone: UTC+1 (West Africa Time)

Barbacha (Kabyle: Iberbacen) is a commune in northern Algeria in the Béjaïa Province in the Kabylia region. The population is mainly composed of indigenous Amazigh people from the Kabyle Region.

== History ==
Following the 2001 Black Spring in Algeria, residents in the area became increasingly hostile towards the government and police. They often engage in arson attacks against local courts, government offices, political party offices, welfare centres and police stations under the slogan 'You can't kill us, we are already dead!' alongside road blockades and strikes. The police, gendarmerie and military were expelled from the region and Barbacha has since seen very little crime. There is still a functioning city government, making Barbacha a functioning model of dual power. Democratic assemblies modelled off traditional village councils were created as a dual power system and coordinate further protests, garbage collection, fuel distribution, cleaning, welfare programs and maintenance for local schools and public services. The area has been praised by anarchists as a positive development for the community and is noted for its strong sense of anti-authoritarianism.
