= Ferhat Mehenni =

Kabyle political activist (born 1951)

Mas Ferhat Mehenni
- Ferḥat Mhenni
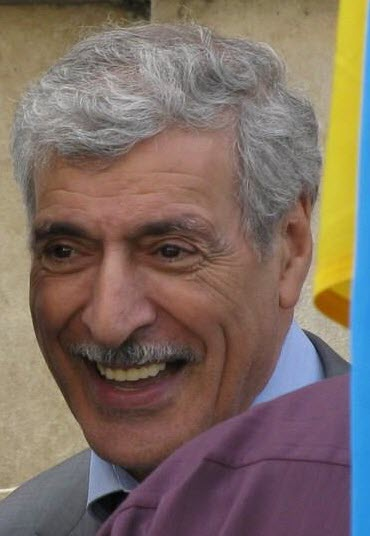
- Photo taken at the gathering of September 4, 2011, on the Plaza of Human Rights in Paris.

1st President of the Anavad
- Incumbent
- Assumed office June 4, 2010
- Prime Minister: See list: Lhacène Ziani; Zidane Lafdal; Hanafi Ferhouh

1st & 5th President of the MAK
- Incumbent
- Assumed office November 17, 2016
- Preceded by: Bouaziz Ait Chebib
- In office August 24, 2001 – December 9, 2011
- Preceded by: Office established
- Succeeded by: Mohand-Larbi Tayeb

Personal details
- Born: March 5, 1951 (age 75) Illoula Oumalou, Tizi Ouzou Province, Algeria
- Citizenship: Kabyle
- Party: MCB; RCD (1989–1997); MAK (2001–present)
- Education: University of Algiers
- Profession: Politician

Ferhat Mehenni (Kabyle: Ferḥat Mhenni; born March 5, 1951) also known as Ferhat Imazighen Imula (Kabyle: Ferḥat Imaziɣen Imula) is a Kabyle politician in exile, writer, protest singer, musician and songwriter, founder and first President of the Movement for the Self-Determination of Kabylia. He has been President of the Kabyle Government in Exile since June 1, 2010.

== Career and Politics ==
=== Early life ===
Mehenni was born on March 5, 1951, in Illoula Oumalou, Tizi Ouzou Province, Algeria. He graduated from the University of Algiers with a degree in political science. Soon after, he began his career as a protest singer and political activist.

=== Activism ===
Due to his struggle for human rights and advocacy for Amazigh and indigenous cultural rights, Mehenni was arrested 13 times, imprisoned for three years, and tortured repeatedly by Algeria's military regime.

In response to the Black Spring massacre in Kabylia, Mehenni established the Movement for the Autonomy of Kabylia (MAK). The MAK was later reformed into the Movement for the Self-Determination of Kabylia.

Mehenni's eldest son, Améziane Mehenni, was assassinated in 2004.

=== Pro-Israel ===
Mehenni has long been an outspoken supporter of Israel, drawing comparisons between his own cause and the Zionist cause. He made a visit to Israel in 2012, meeting Likud hardliners such as Danny Danon, and took part in a pro-Israel demonstration in Paris in October 2023 amid the Gaza war. The relationship has been described as consistent with Israel's periphery doctrine.

== Discography ==
- Chants révolutionnaires de Kabylie (1979)
- Chants berbères de lutte et d'espoir (1981)
- L'Algérie a 20 ans (1983)
- Chants d'acier...d'amour et de liberté (1994)
- Chants de feu et de l'eau (1996)
- Hymne à la Kabylie (2002)
- Requiem et Espoir (2008)
- Liberté pour la Kabylie (2015)

== Publications ==
- Mehenni, Ferhat (2004). Algérie : la question kabyle. Paris: Éditions Michalon. p. 187. ISBN 978-2-84186-226-9.
- Mehenni, Ferhat (2010). Le siècle identitaire [la fin des États post-coloniaux] (in French). Paris: Éditions Michalon. p. 192. ISBN 978-2-84186-544-4.
- Mehenni, Ferhat (2013). Afrique : le casse-tête français [La France va-t-elle perdre l'Afrique ?] (in French). Paris: Les éditions de Passy. p. 112. ISBN 978-2-35146-054-2.
- Mehenni, Ferhat (2015). Noël en otage (in French). Paris: Éditions Michalon. p. 192. ISBN 978-2-84186-814-8.
- Mehenni, Ferhat (2017). Kabylie [Mémorandum pour l'indépendance] (in French). Paris: Éditions Fauves. p. 286. ISBN 979-10-302-007-75.
- Mehenni, Ferhat (2021). Réflexions dans le feu de l'action [Histoire de la renaissance du peuple kabyle] (in French). Paris: Éditions Fauves. p. 374. ISBN 979-10-302-0392-9.
