= Berber Arouch Citizens' Movement =

Political party in Algeria

The Arouch Movement or Berber Arouch Citizens' Movement (Kabyle: Leɛṛac; French: Mouvement citoyen des Aarchs) is an organization in Algeria representing the Kabyle people, a Berber group of the province of Kabylie. Their name, Arouch, is the plural form of the word Arch, referring to a traditional Kabyle form of democratic political assembly. The movement was started after the Black Spring disturbances in 2001, in which 126 Kabyle protesters were killed by Algerian gendarmes. The Arouch have a horizontal leadership and it has no leader, although charismatic arouch representatives like Belaïd Abrika have emerged.

The United States Department of State and Congressional Research Service have reported on state harassment of the Arouch.

== Goals ==
The Arouch has stated political goals in a document known as the El Kseur Platform. Among them are:

- Recognition of the Berber language as a national and official language alongside Arabic; the demand was met.
- The withdrawal of the Algerian gendarmerie security forces from Kabylie; the demand was met.
- Expanded democracy.
- Expanded social rights.

The Arouch views about the status of Kabylie are as diverse as the number of its representatives, some supporting a federal state, others support a regional autonomy, and the rest are for decentralization.

== See also ==
- Politics of Algeria
- Rally for Culture and Democracy (RCD) - The main Liberal Berber party.
- Socialist Forces Front (FFS) - The main Socialist Berber party.
