= Chants révolutionnaires de Kabylie =

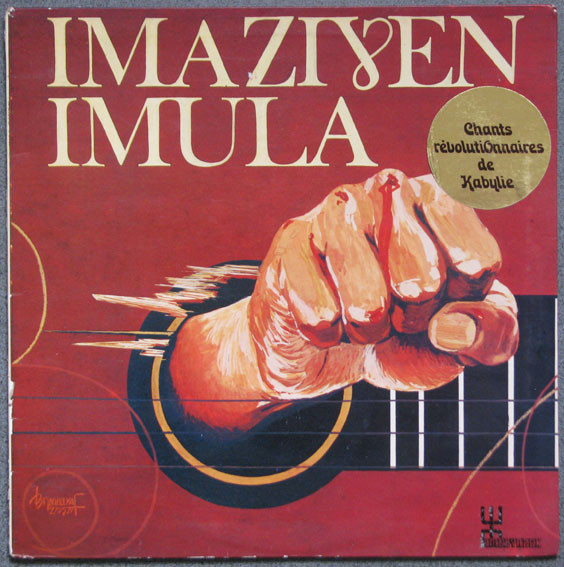

Studio album by Ferhat Mehenni
- Released: May 10, 1979
- Genres: Kabyle music, folk
- Length: 33:50
- Label: Imedyazen

Ferhat Mehenni chronology
Chants révolutionnaires de Kabylie (1979)	Chants berbères de lutte et d'espoir (1981)

Chants révolutionnaires de Kabylie is the debut studio album by Kabyle singer Ferhat Mehenni and his group Imaziɣen Imula, released in 1979.

== Track listing ==
Side A

All tracks are written by Ferhat Mehenni, except where noted.

No.	Title	Writer(s)	Length
1.	"Imesdurar"		4:30
2.	"Ayen Riɣ"	Abdallah Mohia	2:58
3.	"Tamaziɣt"		3:22
4.	"Asif Yečča Yi"		3:15
5.	"Aḍu"		2:51

Side B

All tracks are written by Ferhat Mehenni, except where noted.

No.	Title	Writer(s)	Length
1.	"Yir Targit"		3:25
2.	"Ameddakwel"	Ali Laïmèche	2:58
3.	"Tizi Bbwassa"		6:07
4.	"Aqcic D Uâaṭṭaṛ"		4:43
