= Saïd Sadi =

Algerian politician (born 1947)

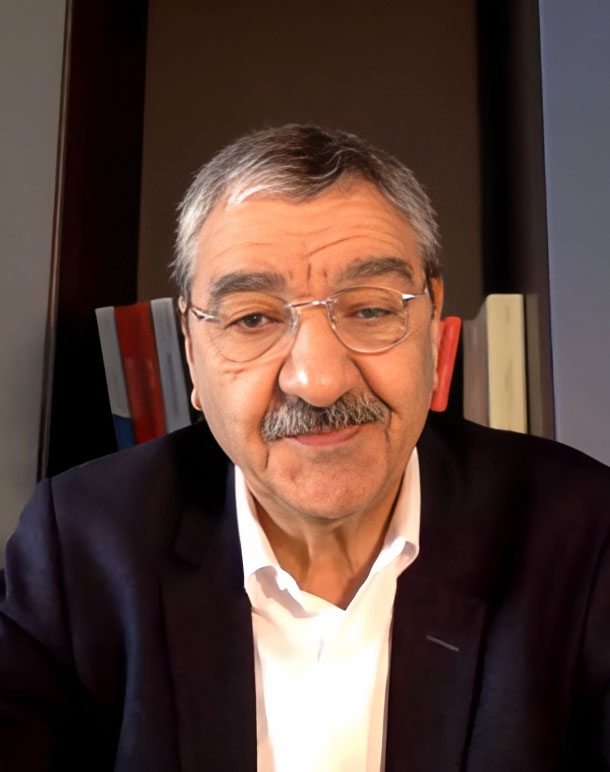
Said Sadi.

Saïd Sadi (Note: Kabyle: Sεid Seεdi) (born 26 August 1947) is an Algerian politician who was President of the Rally for Culture and Democracy (RCD) until 2012. He is founder of the first Algerian human rights league.

== Biography ==
Born at Aghribs, now in Tizi Ouzou Province, Sadi is a psychiatrist by profession. He was among the first Berber intellectuals who, from the early days of the country's independence in 1962, began to openly challenge by peaceful means the Algerian government policies of oppression and denial of the rights of the Berber population. He was jailed on several occasions for his political views.

Following the collapse of the one-party state in 1988, Sadi founded the RCD in 1989 on the basis of secularism and cultural pluralism; the party has found a niche as a Liberal party espousing Kabyle Berber grievances.

He was a candidate in the 1995 presidential election and received 9% of the vote. He boycotted the 1999 presidential election but participated in the 2004 presidential election, receiving 1.9% of the vote on that occasion.

Sadi announced on 15 January 2009 that the RCD would not participate in the April 2009 presidential election, which he described as a "pathetic and dangerous circus", saying that to participate "would be tantamount to complicity in an operation of national humiliation". He decided to step down from the presidency of his party to become a simple activist. "With a serene conscience and full confidence in the future, I announce my decision not to stand for re-election as president of the RCD," he told the congressmen.

On 9 March 2012 he officially resigned from the presidency of the RCD at a party congress. Mohcine Belabbes was elected as his replacement the following day, at the same congress.

On February 9, 2018, Saïd Sadi announced his withdrawal from the RCD.

== Bibliography ==
Dr Sadi is the author of several books and pamphlets, including Askuti, which is generally acknowledged to be the first novel written in Berber.

- 1982 : Askuti (éd. Imadyazen, Paris.)
- 1990 : Le RCD, à cœur ouvert. (éd. parenthèses. Alger.)
- 1991 : Culture et démocratie. (éd. parenthèses, Alger.)
- 1991 : L'Algérie, l'échec recommencé. (éd. parenthèses, Alger.)
- 1996 : L'Algérie, l'heure de vérité. (éd. Flammarion, Paris.)
- 2010 : Amirouche : une vie, deux morts, un testament. (Imprimerie les oliviers Tizi Ouzou 2010 (ISBN 9789947028797)) et chez l'Harmattan Paris 2010 (ISBN 9782296124509).
- 2017: Chérif Khedam: Abrid iggunnin (Le chemin du devoir). ISBN 9789947048924
- 2019: Révolution du 22 février, un miracle algérien.(éditions Frantz Fanon).
- 2020: Mémoires(Tome I) : La Guerre comme berceau ( 1947-1967).(éditions Frantz Fanon).
