= Mohand Arav Bessaoud =

Algerian activist and writer (1924–2002)

- Muḥend Aεrav Besεud
- Born: 24 December 1924; Taguemount, Ouadhia, French Algeria
- Died: 1 January 2002; Newport, England
- Citizenship: French (until 1962); Algerian (from 1962)
- Years active: 1950–2002
- Organization: Berber Academy
- Political party: PPA; FLN; FFS
- Movement: Berberism
- Partner: Fatima Debouze
- Military career
- Allegiance: Algeria (ALN)
- Rank: Captain
- Conflicts: Algerian War

Mohand Arav Bessaoud (Tamazight: Muḥend Aεrav Besεud, 24 December 1924 in Taguemount El Djedid, Algeria – 1 January 2002 in Newport) was a Kabyle writer, activist and soldier of National Liberation Front (Algeria). He was described as the spiritual father of Amazighism, and a strong supporter of Tamazight.

== Biography ==
Mohand Arav was part of the early movement that led to the rise of the National Liberation Front. He had published Happy The Martyrs Who Have Seen Nothing in 1963 in which he documented his war experience against the French. This book earned him the death penalty by the Ahmed Ben Bella administration. More precisely, he wrote explicitly how Ramdane Abbane (one of the historic leaders of the Algerian movement) was murdered by Abdelhafid Boussouf, and not killed in combat.

In 1965, Bessaoud fled to France. Along with individuals including Taos Amrouche, Mohammed Arkoun, Abdelkader Rahmani, Mohand Saïd Hanouz, he cofounded the Academie Berbere in Paris in 1966. In 1969, he organized the first Berber music concert, and launched a Berber-focused magazine, Imazighène. That year, the Academie Berbere became Agraw Imazighen. He designed the modern Berber flag in 1970.

In 1978, following diplomatic pressure from Algeria, France asked Mohand Arav to leave the country. He dissolved the Academie Berbere and settled in the Isle of Wight. In 1997, he returned to Algeria, his last trip to his home country before dying on 1 January 2002.

== Published work ==
Mohand Arav wrote on the war of independence, its aftermath and the history of the Berbers. He was considered a leading light of Berberism during the 20th and early 21st centuries.

- Happy The Martyrs Who Have Seen Nothing, 1963
- The FFS: Hope and Betrayal, 1966
- Little people for a great cause, or the history of the Berber Academy 1966-1978, 2000
- The provisional identity
- A few pages of our history, with Saïd Aït Ameur
- Berber names

== See also ==
- Academie Berbere
- Berber flag
- List of Berbers
