= Standard Algerian Amazigh =

Standardized national variety of Berber spoken in Algeria

Algerian Tamazight
- Tamaziɣt ثامازيغث ⵜⴰⵎⴰⵣⵉⵖⵜ
- Native to: Algeria
- Date: 2016
- Region: Algeria
- Language family: Afro-Asiatic: Berber; Northern Berber; Algerian Tamazight
- Writing system: Latin, Tifinagh, Arabic

Official status
- Official language in: Algeria
- Regulated by: Algerian Academy of Amazigh Language

Language codes
- ISO 639-3: –

Standard Algerian Amazigh, officially known as Tamazight, is a standardized language developed by the Algerian Academy of the Amazigh Language since it was made an official language in Algeria in 2016. It combines features of several Berber languages, primarily Kabyle.

The standardization is largely based on the works of Mouloud Mammeri (the Dictionnaire and the Précis de grammaire berbère (kabyle), ISBN 9782906659001). Due to disagreements, it lacks standardization in terms of a writing system between Latin, Tifinagh, and Arabic.

As of 2017, 350,000 pupils were studying Tamazight in 38 wilayas out of 48, representing 4% of all students. Ninety percent of them study Tamazight in Latin characters. In 2018, the government announced that optional classes of Tamazight will be offered in all public primary and secondary schools in the future.

== See also ==
- Kabyle language
- Standard Moroccan Amazigh
- Berbers
- Berber Languages
- Languages of Algeria
