= Tamazgha =

Geocultural region inhabited by the Berber people

Tamazgha Tamazɣa, ⵜⴰⵎⴰⵣⵖⴰ, ⵜⴰⵎⴰⵣⵗⴰ Berber World
- Cultural region
- Flag

- Location of Tamazgha (green) in Africa
- Part of: Algeria, Burkina Faso (Oudalan), Egypt (Siwa and Qara), Libya (Cyrenaica, Fezzan and Tripolitania), Mali (Azawad), Mauritania (Adrar and Tagant), Morocco, Niger (Aïr), Spain (Canaries), Tunisia, Western Sahara
- Highest elevation: 4,167 m (13,671 ft)
- Lowest elevation: −55 m (−180 ft)

Population
  - Total: c. 110,000,000

Demographics
  - Language: Darija, Berber languages
  - Religion: Islam
- Time zone: WAT (Algeria, Morocco, Tunisia, Western Sahara, Niger); GMT (Mali, Mauritania); CAT (Libya)

Tamazgha (Latin Tamazight: Tamazɣa; Neo-Tifinagh Tamazight: ⵜⴰⵎⴰⵣⵖⴰ) is a term in the Berber languages denoting the lands traditionally inhabited by the Berber people within the Maghreb.

The term was coined in the 1970s by the Berber Academy and, since the late 1990s, has gained particular significance among speakers of Berber languages. Although a neologism, Tamazgha, is grounded in historical reality. While it is used politically, it also simply refers to the land that Berbers have inhabited since antiquity.

The territories that it would encompass are the Canary Islands and the Siwa Oasis, Morocco, Algeria, Tunisia, Libya, Mauritania, Western Sahara, and parts of Mali, Niger, Burkina Faso and Senegal.

== Overview ==
Historically, Berbers have recognized one another as belonging to a similar cultural and linguistic group, according to Laroui this recognition existed even prior to Roman and Phoenician settlements, which is supported by subsequent research.

The Berbers have endonym for themselves in their language which is called Tamazight, for the Berbers as a people they refer to themselves as the Imazighan. The word Imazighan comes from the word Amazigh which derives from a name used by the Berbers in the ancient era. This name is found in Ancient Tifinagh inscriptions written as "MSK" and in Roman inscriptions it is written as "Masik" and "Mazix".

Ramzi Rouighi argues that the Amazigh started being referred to collectively as Berbers following the Muslim conquest of the Maghreb in the 7th century. This word referred mostly to groups in northwest Africa.

This, out of political necessity, was then solidified during French colonization, to fight for civil rights, Berbers needed a unified political identity the French colonial empire understood. Which, despite having a diverse Maghreb populace, made a clear dual divide of Arab and Berber. As such, it was in this period when 'Berbère' became a relatively common term of self-identification.

In an attempt to reclaim the identity from the history of colonization, the Agraw Imazighen coined the term Tamazɣa using the pre-existing triconsonantal root M-Z-Ɣ in the 1970s to refer to the lands where the different Berber languages were spoken.

The term has been translated into Spanish as Mazigia, abbreviated as MZG and used as an alternative international license plate code for some people.
