= Berber flag =

Ethnic flag of the Berber peoples of North Africa

Amazigh flag
- Acenyal amaziɣ, Asenǧaq amaziɣ ⴰⵛⵏⵢⴰⵍ ⴰⵎⴰⵣⵉⵖ
- Use: Ethnic flag
- Proportion: 2:3
- Adopted: 1970 (by Berber Academy); 1997 (by World Amazigh Congress)
- Design: A blue, green and yellow horizontal tricolour with a red yaz (ⵣ) in the center.
- Designed by: Youcef Medkour

The Berber flag or Amazigh flag is an ethnic flag used as a common symbol of related ethnic groups in North Africa. The flag was created to symbolize culture, but with the rise of Berberism it also began to be used in political contexts.

The flag was inaugurated in Wadya, a town of Kabylia situated in Tizi Ouzou, a province of Algeria, by an elder Algerian Kabylian veteran, Youcef Medkour.

== Description ==
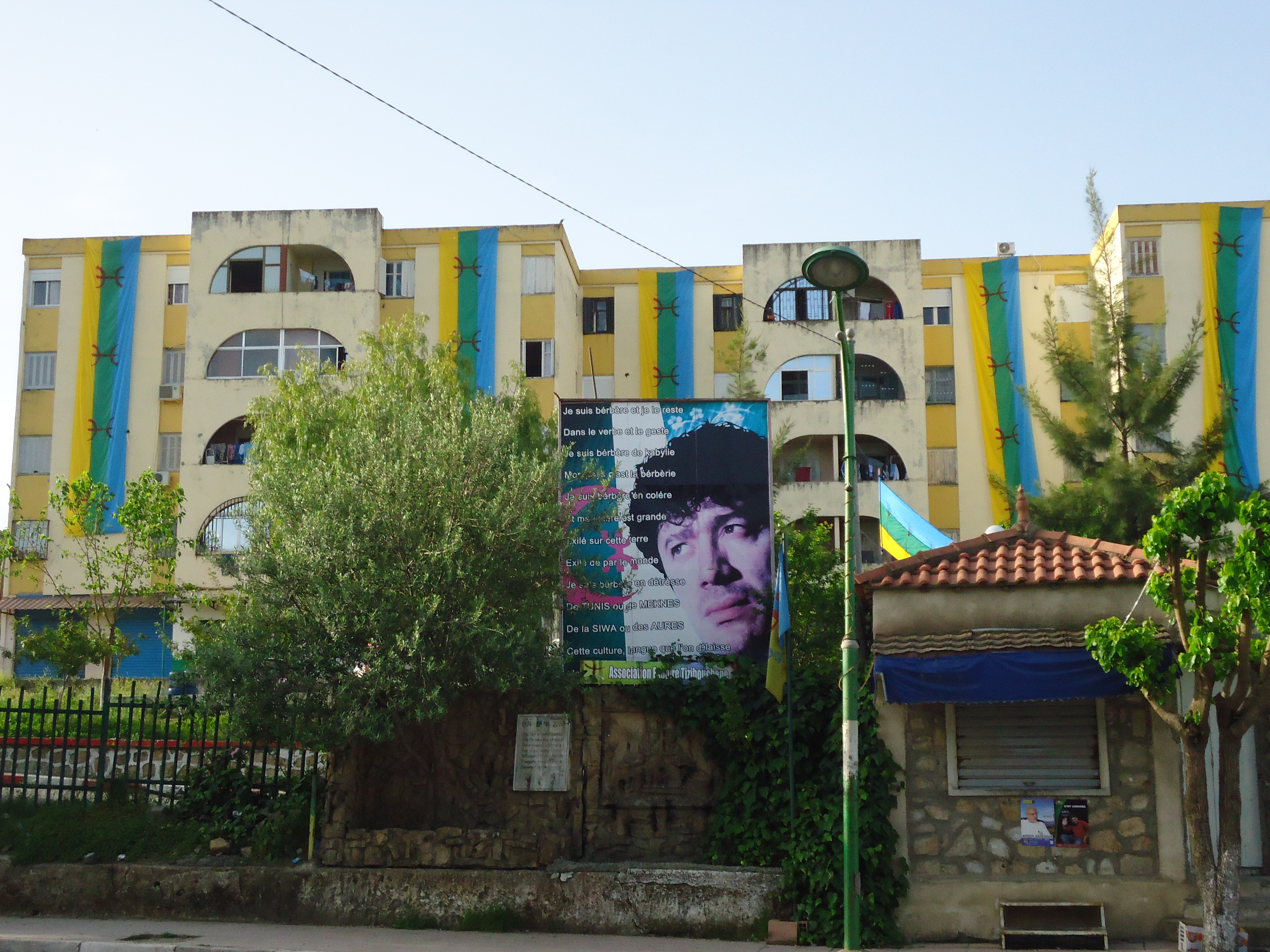
Celebration of the Berber Spring in Azazga in 2016. Also visible is a derived design used as the flag of the movement for the autonomy of Kabylia.

The flag is composed of blue, green, and yellow horizontal bands of the same height, and a Tifinagh letter yaz or aza. Each colour corresponds to an aspect of Tamazgha, the territory inhabited by the Berbers in North Africa:

- Blue represents the sea.
- Green represents the mountains.
- Yellow represents the desert.
- The red of the letter z (ⵣ in Tifinagh) represents resistance and the martyrs/free men of the Imazighen.

The letter z represents the word Amazigh, the root of which it is taken from.

== History ==
Mohand Arav Bessaoud, Algerian activist and founder of Berber Academy, designed the flag in 1970. It was used in demonstrations in the 1980s, and in 1997, the World Amazigh Congress at Tafira in Las Palmas in the Canary Islands made the flag official. During the Hirak movement in 2019, the Amazigh flag was banned from use in Algeria.

== See also ==
- Berberism
- Berber Latin alphabet
- Tifinagh
- Berber mythology
- Mohand Arav Bessaoud
- Flag of the movement for the autonomy of Kabylia
- Flag of Azawad
