= Larbaâ Nath Irathen =

- Commune and town
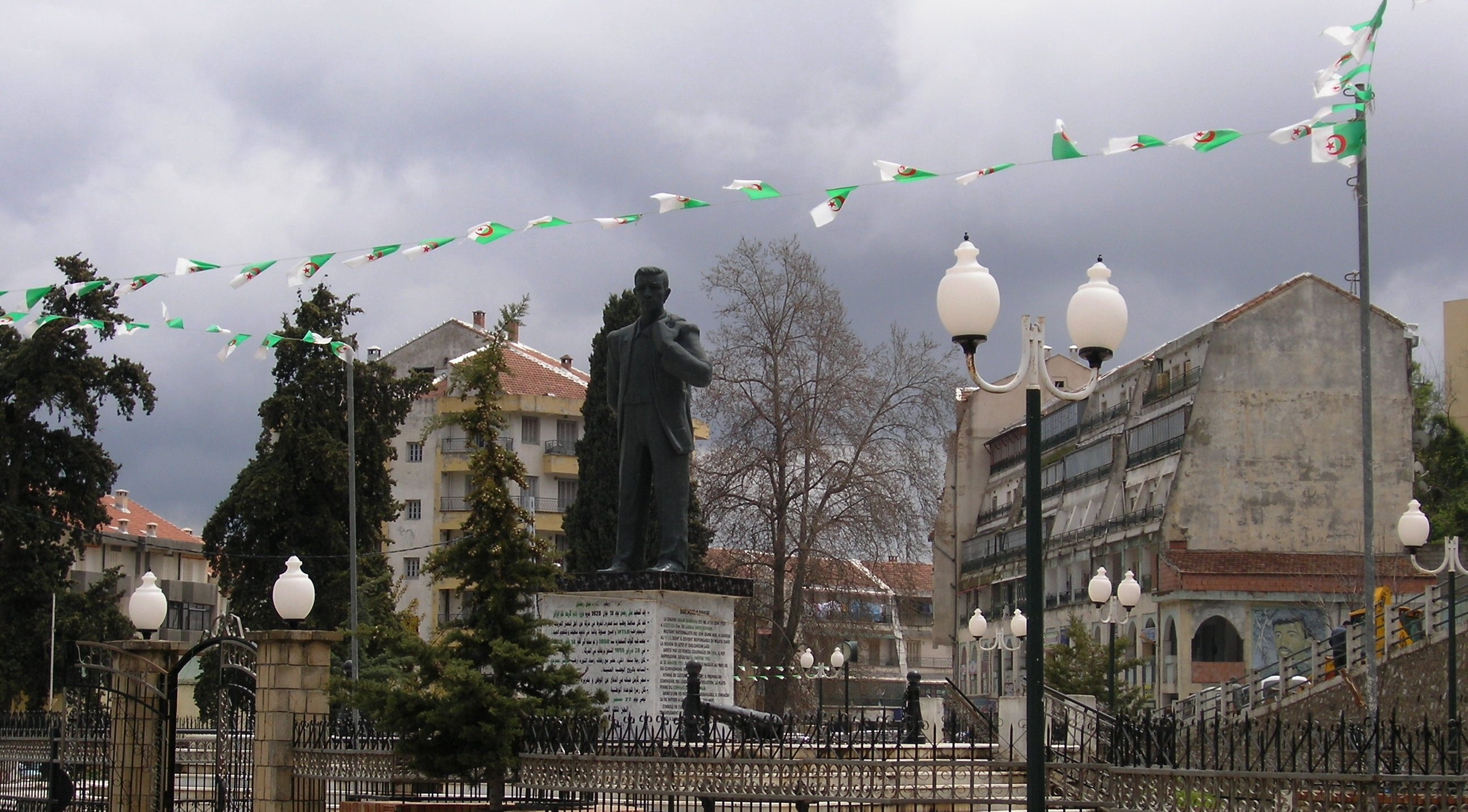

- Location within Algeria
- Coordinates: 36.636614°N 4.206709°E
- Country: Algeria
- Province: Tizi Ouzou Province

Population (2002)
  - Total: 29,773
- Time zone: UTC+1 (CET)

Larbaâ Nath Irathen (Kabyle: Larebɛa n at Yiraten, or in Tifinagh, Arabic: الأربعاء ناث اراتين) is a town in Tizi Ouzou Province, in the central part of northern Algeria. It was formerly known as Fort National. The population in 2002 was 29,773, The area is renowned for its majestic scenery.

== Etymology ==
- Larbaa means "Wednesday" in Arabic, the town's traditional souk day, or "four"/"fourth" in Kabyle
- N means "of"
- Ath Iraten means "sons of Irathen", the name of a major local tribe, recorded by Ibn Khaldun; Irathen may originally have meant "lions".

== History ==
On May 25, 1857, the town was the site of a battle during the French Pacification of Algeria. French-aligned forces under Marshal Jacques Louis Randon defeated Kabyle defenders of the town as part of a campaign to curb Kabyle independence and bring them under the control of French Algeria. Randon won the battle, but suffered 400 dead and 800 injured; Kabyle losses are unknown.

The town was at the forefront of the struggle for Algerian independence that would result in the Algerian War. Each village had its share of martyrs but what distinguishes this commune is that it gave more than five leaders to the North African Star pro-independence organization. Among these leaders are Radjef Belkacem, Messaoui Rabah, Imache Ali, Iffour Rabah and Si Djillani Mohand Said. All these officials are from Ait Oumalou who was part of Larba Nath Irathen at the time. Messaoui Rabah died during the Second World War in Paris. It is also the place of birth of Abane Ramdane.

== Notable residents ==
- Ramdane Haifi
