= Berber Academy =

Kabyle cultural association in France

- Agraw n imaziɣen
- « Ma ulac ṯmaziɣṯ, ulac, ulac » « ⵎⴰ ⵓⵍⴰⵛ ⵝⵎⴰⵣⵉⵖⵝ, ⵓⵍⴰⵛ ⵓⵍⴰⵛ »
- Formation: June 14, 1966; 60 years ago
- Dissolved: March 22, 1978; 48 years ago
- Type: Cultural organization

Académie Berbère d'Échange et de Recherches Culturels, usually shortened to Académie Berbère or the Berber Academy was a Paris-based Kabyle cultural association formed in 1966 and officially authorized in March 1967 with the objective of raising Berber consciousness. The association was renamed Agraw Imazighen (English: Assembly of the Imazighen) in Tamazight in 1969.

== History ==
Berber Academy is primarily associated with Algerian activist Mohand Arav Bessaoud, who formed the group with a small group of "Kabyle luminaries from the worlds of scholarships, arts, and politics," including Ramdane Haifi, Mouloud Mammeri, Mohand Saïd Hanouz, and singer Taos Amrouche, who hosted their first meeting in her home in Paris. The association faced internal disagreement as to whether to have an intellectual or grassroots activist focus.

The association relaunched in 1969 as Agraw Imazighen with the first Berber concert. The relaunch and Tamazight-language name change "marked a shift toward a more particularist, Berber-centered agenda" primarily concerned with making "the general public aware of the history and civilization of the Berbers and to promote their language and culture." This served as a turning point for Berber diaspora culture in France, as well as for the Berberist movement outside of it.

The association published an influential monthly bulletin, Imazighen (French: Imazighéne), in both French and Kabylian, the latter using Neo-Tifinagh. Imazighen and other publications were distributed by the association to thousands of Kabylian coffeehouses throughout Paris, and they were further circulated by readers in Algeria and Morocco. Though Imazighen was viewed by many as overly radical, it was generally very positively received by Berber communities, with thousands of letters of support being sent from Algeria and Morocco. Imazighen ran for thirty issues.

Berber Academy was dissolved in 1976, largely due to lack of finances.

== Neo-Tifinagh ==
Berber Academy created a derivation of the Tuareg Tifinagh orthography, now known as Neo-Tifinagh, to accommodate Kabyle phonetics. They taught local members of the Kabyle diaspora community Neo-Tifinagh, and used it in their widely read bulletin, Imazighen. Neo-Tifinagh has since undergone further reform and is used in various contexts throughout North Africa.

== See also ==
- Berber flag
- Royal Institute of the Amazigh Culture
- Berber language
- Libyco-Berber alphabet
- Tifinagh
