= Rally for Culture and Democracy =

Political party in Algeria

Rally for Culture and Democracy: Rassemblement pour la Culture et la Démocratie (French); التجمع من أجل الثقافة والديمقراطية (Arabic); ⴰⴽⵔⴰⵓ ⵉ ⵉⴷⵍⴻⵙ ⴷ ⵜⵓⴽⴷⵓⵜ (Berber languages); Agraw i Yidles d Tugdut (Kabyle)
- President: Atmane Mazouz
- Founder: Saïd Sadi
- Founded: 1989; 37 years ago
- Split from: Socialist Forces Front
- Headquarters: Algiers
- Ideology: Liberalism; Social liberalism; Berberism; Algerian nationalism; Secularism
- Political position: Centre to centre-left
- National affiliation: Forces of the Democratic Alternative
- Colors: Blue, Yellow
- Council of the Nation: 0 / 174
- People's National Assembly: 4 / 407
- People's Provincial Assemblies: 33 / 2,004
- Municipalities: 37 / 1,540
- People's Municipal Assemblies: 496 / 24,786

Party flag

Website
- rcd-algerie.net

The Rally for Culture and Democracy (RCD; Berber languages: ⴰⴽⵔⴰⵓ ⵉ ⵉⴷⵍⴻⵙ ⴷ ⵜⵓⴽⴷⵓⵜ, romanized: Agraw i Yidles d Tugdut; Arabic: التجمع من أجل الثقافة والديمقراطية; French: Rassemblement pour la Culture et la Démocratie) is a political party in Algeria. It promotes secularism (laïcité) and has its principal power base in Kabylia, a major Berber-speaking region. Some consider it to take the position of a liberal party for the Berber-speaking population in Algerian politics.

== History and profile ==
The Rally for Culture and Democracy was founded by Saïd Sadi in 1989. He was a presidential candidate in 1995, winning 9.3 percent of the popular vote.

In 1997, the party won 19 of 390 seats. The RCD boycotted the 2002 elections. Saïd Sadi was a candidate again in the 2004 presidential election and won 1.9 percent of the vote. The party participated in the 2007 legislative elections, winning 3.36% of the vote and 19 seats.

On March 9, 2012, during an opening speech at the 4th RCD congress, Saïd Sadi announced that he would not seek a new term as president of the RCD. The doctor decided to withdraw from the presidency of his party to become a simple activist. "With a clear conscience and full confidence in the future, I announce my decision not to run for the post of president of the RCD," he told the delegates.

On March 10, 2012, Mohcine Belabbas, deputy of Algiers, was elected president of the RCD, following the party congress, held in Algiers.

The RCD announced on March 20, 2021, that it would boycott the 2021 Algerian legislative elections.

In the repression against political activists that followed the Hirak, the Ministry of the Interior prohibited the RCD from using its premises to host "illegal" political or association meetings. On January 10, 2022, the RCD announced that its president, Mohcine Belabbas, was placed under judicial supervision by the investigating judge. In January 2022, the day after the Council of State froze the activities of the Socialist Workers' Party (PST), the RCD declared that this decision "is none other than a questioning of political pluralism and exercise, hard-won achievements" and denounces "the administrative and judicial relentlessness" which "targets" it as well as its president, Mohcine Belabbas, believing that this "signs an unspeakable and unacceptable authoritarian drift".

The party renews its leadership on June 3, 2022, with the election of Atmane Mazouz as party president.

== Regional strength ==
In the 2007 legislative election, support for the RCD was higher than its national average (3.36%) in the following provinces:

Province	Percentage
Tizi Ouzou Province	34.28%
Béjaïa Province	17.51%
Bouïra Province	9.09%
Algiers Province	8.58%
Illizi Province	7.31%
Tipaza Province	6.89%
Guelma Province	4.83%
Boumerdès Province	4.55%
Saïda Province	4.30%
Sétif Province	4.25%
Aïn Defla Province	3.43%

== Ministers ==
RCD Ministers in the Algerian Government
Minister	Ministère	Government	Start	End
Amara Benyounès	Ministry of Health	Benbitour Government	December 23, 1999	August 26, 2000
Hamid Lounaouci	Ministry of Transport	Benbitour Government Government Benflis I	December 23, 1999	May 31, 2001
Amara Benyounès	Ministry of Public Works	Government Benflis I	August 26, 2000	May 31, 2001

== Visual Identity ==
Visual Identity of the Rassemblement pour la Culture et la Démocratie
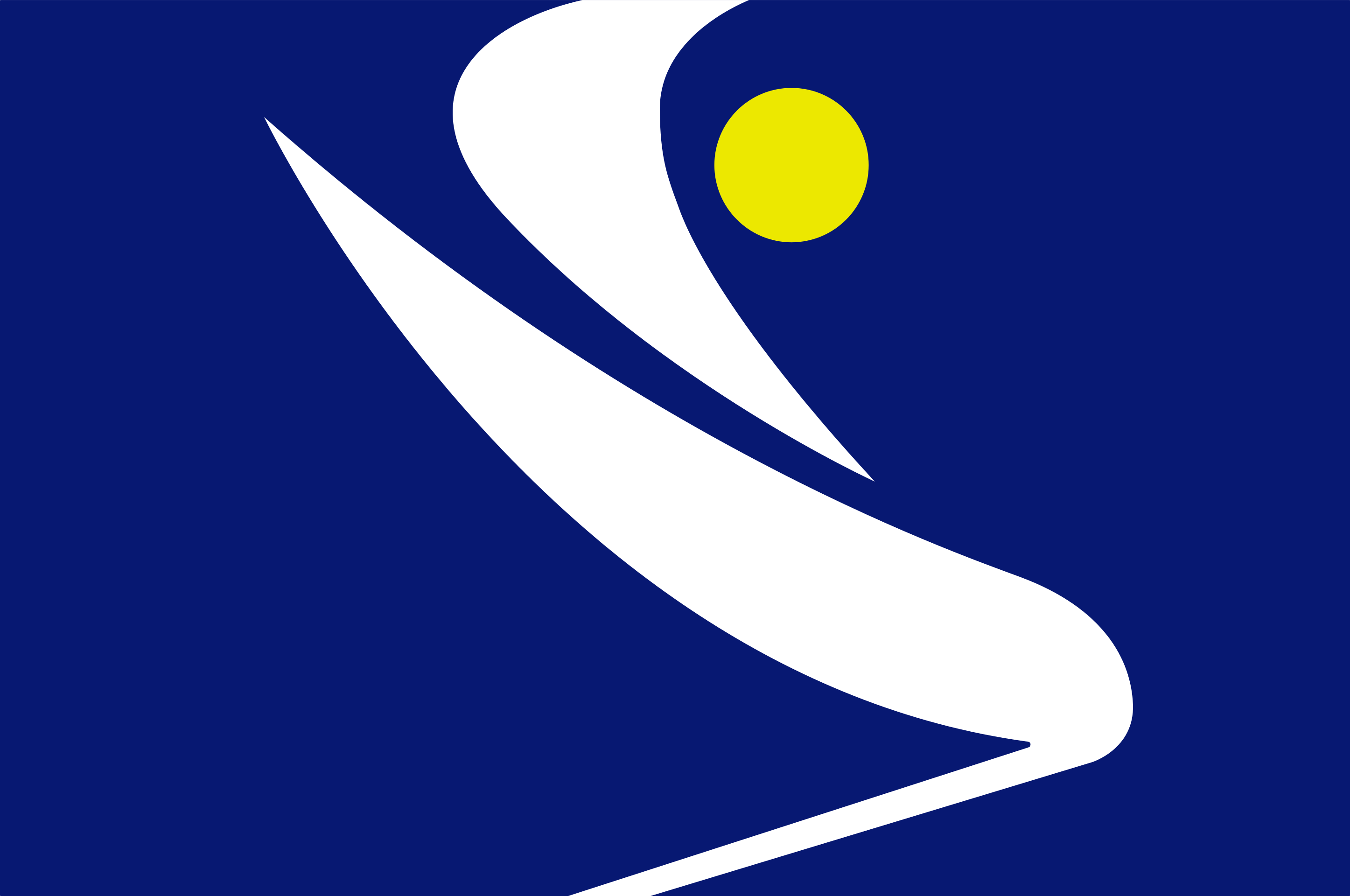
Old flag of the Rassemblement pour la Culture et la Démocratie (pre 2002).

Current flag of the political party.

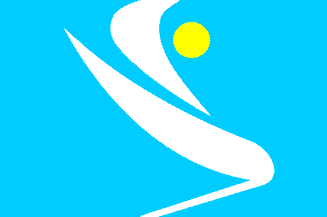
One of the variant flags of the RCD.

== See also ==
- Politics of Algeria
- Socialist Forces Front (FFS), the main socialist Berber party
- Arouch Movement, a Berber political organisation modelled on traditional village councils
- List of liberal parties
