= Kabyle language =

Berber language of northern Algeria

Kabyle
- Kabylian
- Taqbaylit / ⵜⴰⵇⴱⴰⵢⵍⵉⵜ
- Pronunciation: [θɐqβæjlɪθ]
- Native to: Algeria
- Region: Kabylia (Provinces of Béjaïa, Bordj Bou Arreridj, Bouira, Boumerdes, Tizi Ouzou)
- Ethnicity: Kabyles
- Native speakers: Algeria: 3 million (2004, 9.4% of the population) (Note: If that percentage held in 2022, the number of Kabyle speakers in Algeria would be 4.3 million.); Diaspora: 1 million
- Language family: Afro-Asiatic: Berber; Northern; Atlas–Kabyle?; Kabyle
- Standard forms: Standard Algerian Berber
- Dialects: Far-Western; Western; Eastern; Tasahlit (Note: Sometimes classified as a separate language.)
- Writing system: Latin, Tifinagh

Official status
- Official language in: Algeria (as a variant of Tamazight)
- Regulated by: HCA

Language codes
- ISO 639-2: kab
- ISO 639-3: kab
- Glottolog: kaby1243
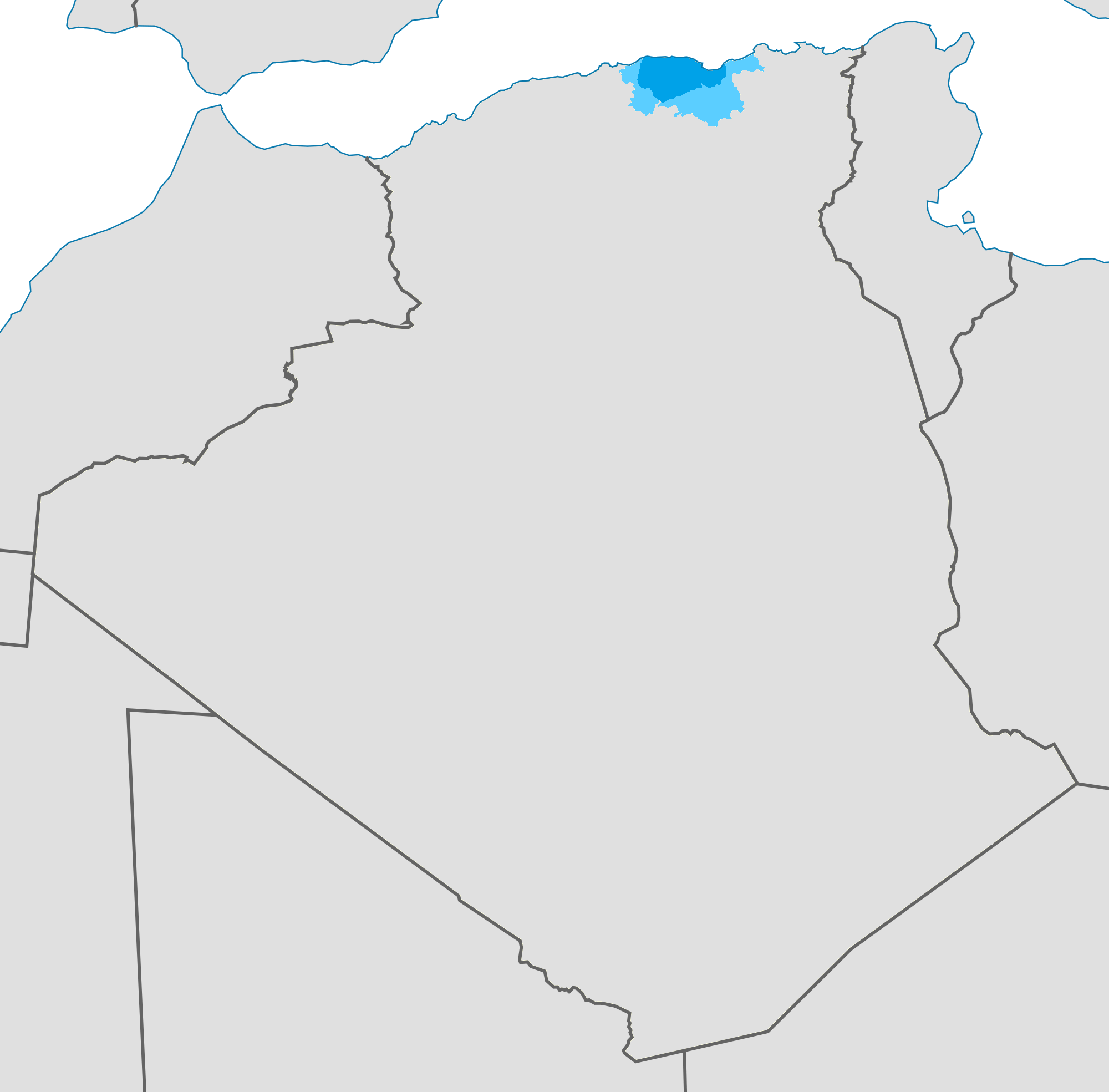
- Areas with significant numbers of people whose first language is Kabyle

Kabyle (/kəˈbaɪl/) or Kabylian (/kəˈbɪliən/; native name: Taqbaylit [θɐqβæjlɪθ]) is a Berber language of the Afroasiatic language family spoken by the Kabyle people in the north and northeast of Algeria. It is spoken primarily in Kabylia.

Estimating the number of Berber speakers is very difficult and figures are often contested. A 2004 estimate was that 9.4% of the Algerian population spoke Kabyle. The number of diaspora speakers has been estimated at one million.

== Classification ==
A Kabyle speaker, recorded in Algeria

Kabyle is one of the Northern Berber languages, a branch of the Berber language family within Afroasiatic. It is believed to have broken off very early from Proto-Berber, although after the Zenaga language did so. According to Kossmann (2020), Kabyle appears to be quite distinct. In several respects, it shares certain linguistic innovations with the western Moroccan dialect group. However, it is unclear whether these similarities result from an earlier expansion of that group into Algeria, which was later interrupted by the spread of Zenati dialects, or whether they represent independent, parallel developments.

== Distribution ==
=== Geographical distribution ===
Map of the linguistic situation of Kabyle in eastern Algeria.

Distribution of Kabyle speakers in 1870 and 1939.

Kabyle Berber is native to Kabylia. It is present in seven Algerian districts. Approximately one-third of Algerians are Berber-speakers, clustered mostly near Algiers, in Kabylian and Shawi, but with some communities related to Kabyle in the west (Shenwa languages), east and south of the country. The populations of Béjaïa (Bgayet), Bouïra (Tubirett) and Tizi Ouzou (Tizi Wezzu) provinces are in majority Kabyle-speaking. In addition, Kabyle is mainly spoken in the provinces of Boumerdès, and as well as in Bordj Bou Arréridj, Jijel, and in Algiers where it coexists with Algerian Arabic.

Kabyle Berber is also spoken as a native language among the Algerian Kabyle-descended diaspora in European and North American cities (mainly France). It is estimated that half of Kabyles live outside the Kabylian region.

=== Number of speakers ===
Estimates on the number of Kabyle speakers in the region vary widely, with different dates and data given for different points of time. As such the number of Kabyle speakers varies considerably depending on different sources given. French ethnologist Camille Lacoste-Dujardin estimates four million Kabyle speakers in 2001 in Algeria. According to the International Encyclopedia of Linguistics there were 2.5 million speakers in Kabylia in 2003 out of 3.1 million worldwide. In 2004, Canadian linguist Jacques Leclerc estimated that there were 3.1 million Kabyle speakers in Algeria (9.4% of the total Algerian population) and 500,000 in France. Salem Chaker estimated there were 5.5 million speakers in 2004, including 3 to 3.5 in Kabylia. The Encyclopædia Universalis gives 7 million Kabyle speakers. The French Ministry of Culture estimated there were one million Kabyle speakers in France in 2013. Linguist Matthias Brenzinger estimates the number of Kabyle speakers in Algeria at between 2.5 and 3 million in 2015. Bruce Maddy-Weitzman's 2018 estimate is more than 5 million Kabyle speakers in Kabylie. Linguist Asya Pereltsvaig gives 5.6 million Kabyle speakers worldwide in 2020, mostly in Algeria. In 2021, Amina Mettouchi, professor of Berber linguistics, estimated the number of speakers at five million worldwide and more than three million in Algeria. In 2022, according to Ethnologue there were 7.5 million speakers worldwide, including 6.4 million in Algeria.

=== Dialects ===
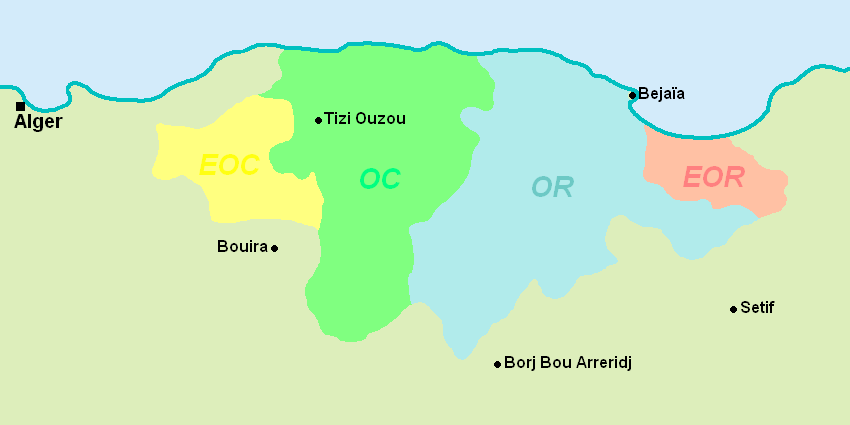
Geographic distribution of Kabyle dialects

Many identify two dialects: Greater Kabylie (west) and Lesser Kabylie (east), but the reality is more complex than that, Kabyle dialects constitute a dialect continuum that can be divided into four main dialects (from west to east):

- Far-western: villages such as Tizi-Ghennif, Boghni and Draa el Mizan.
- Western: villages such as At Menguellat, At Yiraten, At Aïssi, At Yanni,
- Eastern:
  - Eastern-West: villages such as At Mlikeche, Eastern-center: At Aïdel, At Khiar
  - Eastern-East: villages such as At Sliman.
- Far-eastern: villages such as Aokas, Melbou, At Smail. Also known as Tasaḥlit and considered as a separate language by some according to Ethnologue. Mutual intelligibility with Far-western is difficult to absent.

Phonological differences
	Far-western	Western	Eastern		Far-eastern
	Far-western	Western	West	East	Far-eastern
Gemination of /w/	bbʷ	bbʷ	ggʷ	ββ	ww
Assimilation of /n/ + /w/	bbʷ	bbʷ	ggʷ		nw
Labialization	✓	✓	✓	✗	✗
Assimilation of /n/ + /y/	gg	gg	gg	yy	y
affricates /ts/ and /dz/	✓	✓	✓	✗	✗
ḍ	ḍ	ḍ	ḍ	ṭ	ṭ

Grammatical differences
	Far-western	Western	Eastern		Far-eastern	
	Far-western	Western	West	East		Aokas
Verb-framing with n	✓	✓	✗		✗	
Possessive pronouns (ex: 3rd m)	-nnes	-is, -ines	-is, -ines		-is	
Aorist preverb ad	ad	ad	ad		ad	di

==== Lexical differences ====
With the exception of the far-eastern dialect, much of the vocabulary of Kabyle is common across its dialects, though some lexical differences exist, e.g. the word dream in English (from west to east): bargu, argu, argu, bureg.

== Status and usage ==
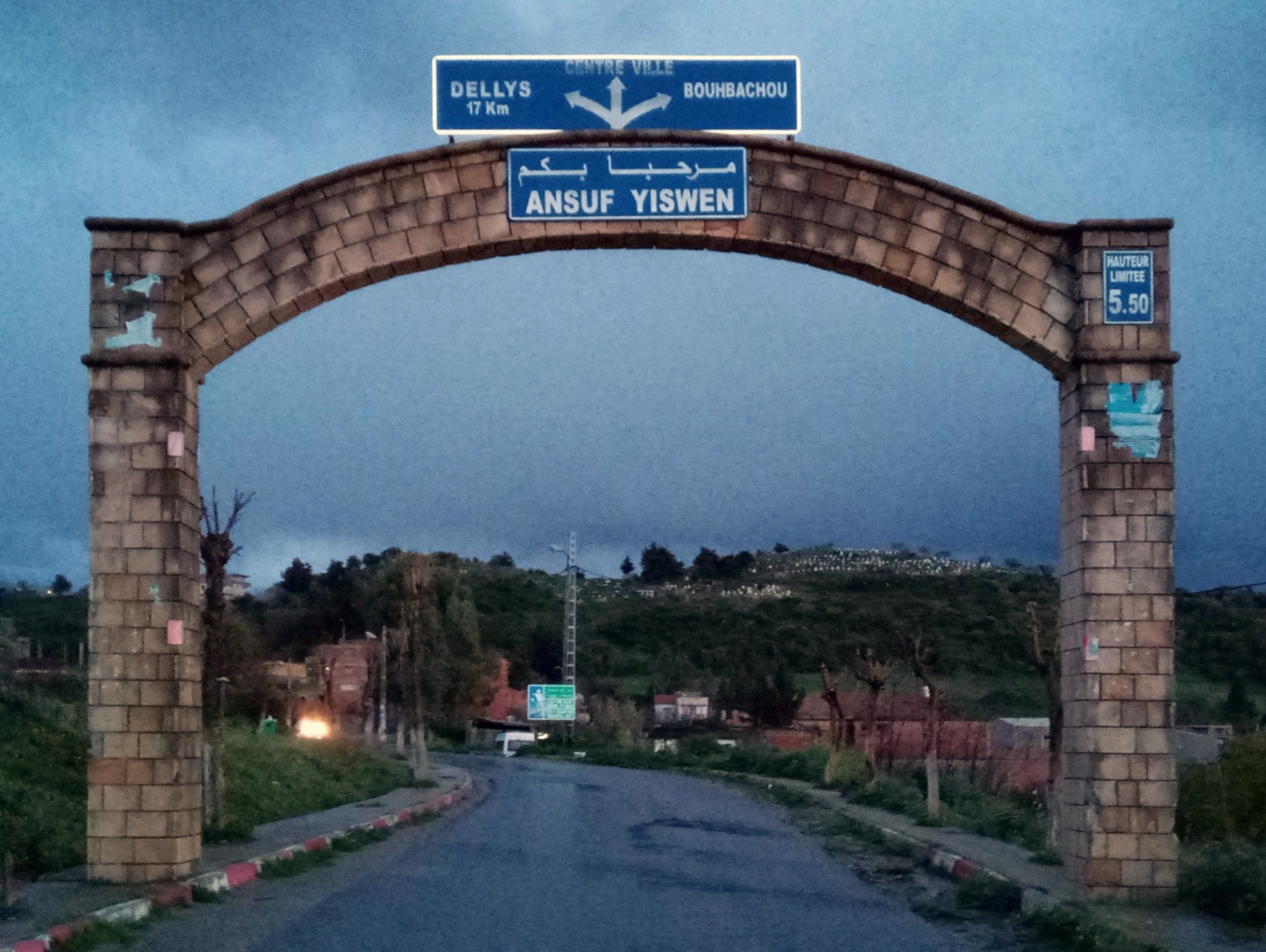
Entrance arch in Taourga with welcome sign (Ansuf yiswen) in Kabyle

=== Multilingualism and language shift ===
Almost all Berber speakers are multilingual, in Arabic and often also in French. Kabyle is still strong in villages but urban Kabyles in Algeria are increasingly shifting to Arabic and diaspora Kabyles to the surrounding language. A 2013 study found that 54% of Kabyles living in Oran spoke Arabic to their siblings.

=== Official status ===
After the 2001–02 widespread Kabyle protests known as the Black Spring, the Berber (Amazigh) language (with all its Algerian dialects and varieties) was recognized as a 'national language' in the 2002 Algerian Constitution, but not as an 'official language' until 2016 after a long campaign by activists. French is not recognized in any legal document of Algeria but enjoys a de facto position of an official language as it is used in every Algerian official administration or institution, at all levels of the government, sometimes much more than Arabic.

The Berber (Amazigh) language faces an unfavourable environment, despite a public radio in Algeria (Channel II, which dates back to 1925), as well as a public TV channel in Morocco (Channel IV or Tamazight TV). Since private ownership of TV channels is illegal in Algeria, Kabyles have launched a private Kabyle speaking TV channel, called Berbère Television, that broadcasts from France. There is no Kabyle newspaper. Some Algerian newspapers such as La Dépêche de Kabylie offer a small Kabyle section.

In 1994, Kabyle pupils and students boycotted Algerian schools for a year, demanding the officialization of Berber, leading to the symbolic creation of the "Haut commissariat à l'amazighité" (HCA) in 1995. Berber was subsequently taught as a non-compulsory language in Berber speaking areas. The course being optional, few people attend. The Kabyle school boycott also resulted in the first recognition of Amazigh as a national language in November 1996.

President Bouteflika has frequently stated that "Amazigh (the Berber language) will never be an official language, and if it has to be a national language, it must be submitted to a referendum". In 2005, President Bouteflika, stated that "there is no country in the world with two official languages" and "this will never be the case of Algeria". Nevertheless, after four decades of pacific struggle, riots, strikes, and social mobilization, including the Berber spring (1980, riots and strikes in the Kabylie region of Tizi Ouzou, Bouira and Bejaïa, as well as Algiers) and the Black Spring in 2001, President Bouteflika and his government recognized Amazigh (Berber) as a "national language" for the second time through a 2002 constitutional amendment.

In February 2016, the Algerian parliament passed a constitutional amendment that made Amazight an official language alongside Arabic.

== Phonology ==
The phonemes below reflect the pronunciation of Kabyle.

=== Vowels ===
Kabyle has three phonemic vowels:

Kabyle vowel phonemes
	Front	Central	Back
Close	i		u
Open		a	

⟨e⟩ is used to write the epenthetic schwa vowel [ə] which occurs frequently in Kabyle. Historically, it is thought to be the result of a pan-Berber reduction or merger of three other vowels.

The phonetic realization of the vowels, especially /a/, is influenced by the character of the surrounding consonants; emphatic consonants invite a more open realization of the vowel, e.g. aẓru = [azˤru] 'stone' vs. amud = [æmud] 'seed'. Often /a, i, u/ are realized as [æ, ɪ, ʊ].

=== Consonants ===
Kabyle consonant phonemes
		Labial		Dental		Alveolar		Post- alveolar		Palatal		Velar		Uvular		Pharyn- geal	Glottal
		plain	lab.	plain	emph.	plain	emph.	plain	emph.	plain	lab.	plain	lab.	plain	lab.	Pharyn- geal	Glottal
Plosive/ Affricate	voiceless			(t̪) ⟨t⟩	tˤ ⟨ṭ⟩	ts ⟨tt⟩		tʃ ⟨č⟩				(k) ⟨k⟩	kʷ ⟨k⟩	q ⟨q⟩	qʷ ⟨q⟩		
Plosive/ Affricate	voiced	(b) ⟨b⟩	bʷ ⟨b⟩	(d̪) ⟨d⟩		dz ⟨zz⟩		dʒ ⟨ǧ⟩				(ɡ) ⟨g⟩	ɡʷ ⟨g⟩	(ɢ) ⟨q⟩			
Fricative	voiceless	f ⟨f⟩		θ ⟨t⟩		s ⟨s⟩	sˤ ⟨ṣ⟩	ʃ ⟨c⟩	ʃˤ ⟨c⟩	ç ⟨k⟩	çᶣ ⟨k⟩			χ ⟨x⟩	χʷ ⟨x⟩	ħ ⟨ḥ⟩	h ⟨h⟩
Fricative	voiced	β ⟨b⟩		ð ⟨d⟩	ðˤ ⟨ḍ⟩	z ⟨z⟩	zˤ ⟨ẓ⟩	ʒ ⟨j⟩	ʒˤ ⟨j⟩	ʝ ⟨g⟩	ʝᶣ ⟨g⟩			ʁ ⟨ɣ⟩	ʁʷ ⟨ɣ⟩	ʕ ⟨ɛ⟩	
Nasal		m ⟨m⟩		n ⟨n⟩													
Trill				r ⟨r⟩	rˤ ⟨ṛ⟩												
Approximant				l ⟨l⟩	lˤ ⟨l⟩					j ⟨y⟩			w ⟨w⟩				

==== Assimilation ====
In the Kabyle language there are various accents which are the result of assimilations (these accents are generally divided into western and eastern Kabyle). Some of these assimilations are present among all Kabyle "dialects" and some not. These assimilations are not noted in writing, such as:

- Axxam n wergaz ("the house of the man") is pronounced either "axxam n wergaz", "axxam bb wergaz" or "axxam pp wergaz". (N+W=BB)
- D taqcict ("it's a girl") is pronounced "tsaqcict". (D+T=TS)
- Here is a list of some of these assimilations: D/T+T=TS, N+W=BB/PP, I+Y=IG.

Gemination affects the quality of certain consonants, turning semivowels and fricatives into stops; in particular, geminated ɣ becomes qq, geminated y becomes gg, and geminated w becomes bb.

==== Fricatives vs. stops ====
Kabyle is mostly composed of fricatives, phonemes which are originally stops in other Berber languages, but in writing there is no difference between fricatives and stops. Below is a list of fricatives vs. stops and when they are pronounced (note that gemination turns fricatives into stops).

Consonant	B /β/	D /ð/	G /ʝ/	K /ç/	T /θ/
Fricative	β	ð	ʝ	ç	θ
Stop	b	d̪	ɡ	k	t̪
Is a stop after	m	l,n	b,j,r,z,ɛ	f,b,s,l,r,n,ḥ,c,ɛ	l,m,n
Is a stop in the words (and their derivatives)			ngeb, ngeḥ, ngeẓwer, angaẓ, ngedwi, nages, ngedwal		

A similar phenomenon can be observed in Gadsup.

== Writing system ==
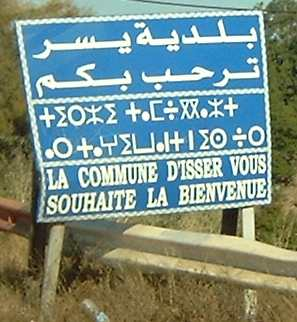
A trilingual sign in Algeria, written in Arabic, Kabyle (using Tifinagh), and French

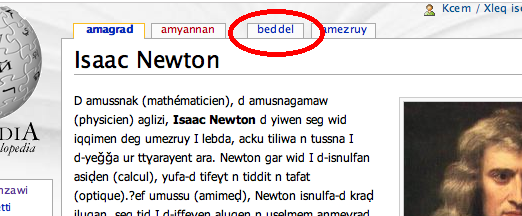
Kabyle language edition of Wikipedia

The most ancient Berber writings were written in the Libyco-Berber script, mostly from Numidian and Roman times. This script was an abjad, and is not yet completely deciphered today. Deciphered scripts are mostly funerary, following a simple formula of "X son of Y" (X u Y) which is still used to this day in the Kabyle language. Such writings have been found in Kabylie (also known as Kabylia) and continue to be discovered by archeologists. The Tifinagh script of the Tuaregs was a direct continuation of this earlier script.

The Libyco-Berber alphabet disappeared in the region of Kabylia by the sixth century, when Latin became the official and administrative language in North Africa, as in the rest of the former Roman empire.

Kabyle became a mostly spoken language after the Arabic conquest of North Africa, and while many examples of the Kabyle language written in a form of Berber-Arabic script survive, the number of Kabyle texts was relatively much smaller than those written in other Berber languages such as Shilha, Mozabite, and Nafusi.

The first French–Kabyle dictionary was compiled by a French ethnologist in the 18th century. It was written in Latin script with an orthography based on that of French.

However, the Kabyle language really became a written language again in the beginning of the 19th century. Under French influence, Kabyle intellectuals began to use the Latin script. "Tamacahutt n wuccen" by Brahim Zellal was one of the first Kabyle books written using this alphabet.

After the independence of Algeria, some Kabyle activists tried to revive the Libyco-Berber script, which is still in use by the Tuareg. Attempts were made to modernize the writing system by modifying the shape of the letters and by adding vowels. This new version of Tifinagh has been called Neo-Tifinagh and has been adopted as the official script for Berber languages in Morocco. However, a majority of Berber activists (both in Morocco and Algeria) prefer the Latin script and see the Tifinagh as a hindrance to literacy in Berber. Kabyle literature continues to be written in Latin script. The use of Tifinagh is limited to logos.

Mouloud Mammeri codified a new orthography for the Kabyle language which avoided using French orthography. His script became widely adopted by Kabyle writers and linguists, and was refined into a unified northern Berber alphabet at a 1996 INALCO workshop. The Algerian HCA has since used this Latin-based system as the basis for standardization efforts. It uses diacritics and two letters from the extended Latin alphabet: Č Ḍ Ɛ Ǧ Ɣ Ḥ Ṣ Ṭ Ẓ.

== Grammar ==
=== Nouns ===
Kabyle has two genders: masculine and feminine. As in most Berber languages, masculine nouns and adjectives generally start with a vowel (a-, i-, u-), while feminine nouns generally start with t- and end with a -t, e.g. aqcic 'boy' vs. taqcict 'girl'.

Plurals generally are formed by replacing initial a- with i-, and either suffixing -en ("regular/external" plurals), changing vowels within the word ("broken/internal" plurals), or both. Examples:

argaz → irgazen "men"
adrar → idurar "mountains"
afus → ifassen "hands"

As in all Berber languages, Kabyle has two types of states or cases of the noun: free state and construct state (or 'annexed state'). The free state is morphologically unmarked. The construct state is derived either by changing initial /a-/ to /u-/, loss of initial vowel in some feminine nouns, addition of a semi-vowel word-initially, or in some cases no change occurs at all:

adrar → wedrar "mountain"
tamdint → temdint "town"
tamurt → tmurt "country"
asif → wasif "river"
iles → yiles "tongue"
taddart → taddart "village"

As in Central Morocco Tamazight, construct state is used for subjects placed after their verbs, after prepositions, in noun complement constructions, and after certain numerals. Kabyle also places nouns in construct state when they head a noun phrase containing a co-referential bound pronoun earlier in the utterance.

Examples:

- Free: Yewwet aqcic. "He has beaten a boy". (Verb–object)
- Annexed: Yewwet weqcic. "The boy has beaten". (Verb–subject)

After a preposition (with the exception of "ar" and "s"), all nouns take their annexed state:

- Free state: Aman (water), Kas n waman (a glass of water).

=== Verbs ===
Verbs are conjugated for three tenses: the preterite (past), intensive aorist (present perfect, present continuous, past continuous) and the future (ad+aorist). Unlike other Berber languages, the aorist alone is rarely used in Kabyle (in the other languages it is used to express the present).

- "Weak verbs" have a preterite form that is the same as their aorist. Examples of weak verbs that follow are conjugated at the first person of the singular:

Verb	Preterite	Ad + aorist	Intensive aorist
If (to outdo)	ifeɣ	ad ifeɣ	ttifeɣ
Muqel (to observe)	muqleɣ	ad muqleɣ	ttmuquleɣ
Krez (to plough)	kerzeɣ	ad kerzeɣ	kerrzeɣ

- "Strong verbs" or "irregular verbs":

Verb	Preterite	Ad + aorist	Intensive aorist
Aru (to write)	uriɣ	ad aruɣ	ttaruɣ

Kabyle subject affixes
Person		sg.	pl.
1		... -ɣ	n-...
2	m	t-... -ḍ	t-... -m
2	f	t-... -ḍ	t-... -mt
3	m	i/y-...	... -n
3	f	t-...	... -nt

Verbs are conjugated for person by adding affixes. These suffixes are static and identical for all tenses (only the theme changes). The epenthetic vowel e may be inserted between the affix and the verb. Verbs are always marked for subject and may also inflect for person of direct and indirect object.

Examples:

« Yuɣ-it. » – "He bought it." (He.bought-it)
« Yenna-yas. » – "He said to him." (He.said-to.him)
« Yefka-yas-t. » – "He gave it to him." (He.gave-to.him-it)

Kabyle is a satellite-framed based language, Kabyle verbs use two particles to show the path of motion:

- d orients toward the speaker, and could be translated as "here".
- n orients toward the interlocutor or toward a certain place, and could be translated as "there".

Examples:

- « iruḥ-d » (he came), « iruḥ-n » (he went).
- « awi-d aman» (bring the water), « awi-n aman » (carry away the water).

Kabyle usually expresses negation in two parts, with the particle ur attached to the verb, and one or more negative words that modify the verb or one of its arguments. For example, simple verbal negation is expressed by « ur » before the verb and the particle « ara » after the verb:

- « Urareɣ » ("I played") → « Ur urareɣ ara » ("I did not play")

Other negative words (acemma... etc.) are used in combination with ur to express more complex types of negation. This system developed via Jespersen's cycle.

Verb derivation is performed by adding affixes. There are three types of derivation forms: causative, reflexive and passive.

- Causative: obtained by prefixing the verb with s- / sse- / ssu-:

ffeɣ "to go out" → ssuffeɣ "to make to go out"
kcem "to enter" → ssekcem "to make to enter, to introduce"
irid "to be washed" → ssired "to wash".

- Reflexive: obtained by prefixing the verb with m- / my(e)- / myu-:

ẓer "to see" → mẓer "to see each other"
ṭṭef "to hold" → myuṭṭaf "to hold each other".

- Passive: is obtained by prefixing the verb with ttu- / ttwa- / tt- / mm(e)- / n- / nn-:

krez "to plough" → ttwakrez "to be ploughed"
ečč "to eat" → mmečč "to be eaten".

- Complex forms: obtained by combining two or more of the previous prefixes:

enɣ "to kill" → mmenɣ "to kill each other" → smenɣ "to make to kill each other"

Two prefixes can cancel each other:

enz "to be sold" → zzenz "to sell" → ttuzenz "to be sold" (ttuzenz = enz !!).

Every verb has a corresponding agent noun. In English it could be translated into verb+er. It is obtained by prefixing the verb with « am- » or with « an- » if the first letter is b / f / m / w (there are exceptions, however).

- Examples:

ṭṭef "to hold" → anaṭṭaf "holder"
inig "to travel" → iminig "traveller"
eks "to graze" → ameksa "shepherd"

Verbal nouns are derived differently from different classes of verbal stems (including 'quality verbs'). Often a- or t(u)- is prefixed:

ffer "to hide" → tuffra "hiding" (stem VI), « Tuffra n tidett ur telhi » – "Hiding the truth is bad".
ɣeẓẓ "to bite" → aɣẓaẓ
zdi "to be united" → azday
ini "to say" → timenna

=== Pronouns ===
Pronouns may either occur as standalone words or bound to nouns or verbs.

Person		Singular	Plural
1st	m	nekk / nekkini	nekni
1st	f	nekk / nekkini	nekkenti
2nd	m	kečč / kečči / keččini	kunwi / kenwi
2nd	f	kemm / kemmi / kemmini	kunnemti / kennemti
3rd	m	netta / nettan / nettani	nutni / nitni
3rd	f	nettat	nutenti / nitenti

Example: « Ula d nekk. » – "Me too."

Possessive pronouns are bound to the modified noun.

Person		Singular	Plural
1st	m	(i)w / inu	nneɣ
1st	f	(i)w / inu	nnteɣ
2nd	m	(i)k / inek	nwen
2nd	f	(i)m / inem	nkent
3rd	m	(i)s / ines	nsen
3rd	f	(i)s / ines	nsent

Example : « Axxam-nneɣ. » – "Our house." (House-our)

There are three demonstratives, near-deictic ('this, these'), far-deictic ('that, those') and absence. They may either be suffixed to nouns, or appear in isolation. Examples: « Axxam-a / Axxam-agi» – "This house.", (House-this), «Wagi yelha» – "This is nice." (This is-nice).

=== Prepositions ===
Prepositions precede their objects: « i medden » "to the people", « si taddart » "from the village". All words preceded by a preposition (except « s » and « ar », "towards", "until" ) take the annexed state.

Some prepositions have two forms: one is used with pronominal suffixes and the other form is used in all other contexts, e.g. ger 'between' → gar.

Some prepositions have a corresponding relative pronoun (or interrogative), for example:

« i » "for/to" → « iwumi » "to whom"
« Tefka aksum i wemcic » "she gave meat to the cat" → « Amcic iwumi tefka aksum » "The cat to whom she gave meat."

=== Syntax ===
Negation

Predicative particle 'd'

The predicative particle 'd' is an indispensable tool in speaking Kabyle (or any other Amazigh language). "d" is equivalent to both "it is + adjective" and "to be + adjective", but cannot be replaced by the verb "ili" (to be). It is always followed by a noun in free state.

Examples:

- D taqcict 'it's a girl'
- D nekk 'it's me'
- Nekk d argaz 'I'm a man'
- Idir d anelmad 'Idir is a student'
- Idir yella d anelmad 'Idir was a student'

The predicative particle "d" should not be confused with the particle of coordination "d"; indeed, the latter is followed by a noun at its annexed state while the first is always followed by a noun at its free state.

== Vocabulary ==
Kabyle has absorbed Arabic, French, Latin, Greek and Punic vocabulary. Arabic loanwords representing 22.7% to 46% of the total Kabyle vocabulary, with many estimates putting it at about 35%. The number of French loanwords has not been studied yet. These loanwords are sometimes Berberized and sometimes kept in their original form. The Berberized words follow the regular grammar of Kabyle (free and annexed state).

Examples of Berberized Arabic or French words:

kitāb (Ar.) > taktabt "book"
machine (Fr.) > tamacint "machine"

Many loanwords from Arabic have often a different meaning in Kabyle:

al-māl "property" (Ar.) > lmal "domestic animals" (cf. the etymologies of English cattle and fee)

All verbs of Arabic origin follow a Berber conjugation and verbal derivation:

fahim (Ar.) > fhem "to understand" > ssefhem "to explain".

There are yiwen (f. yiwet) "one", sin (f. snat) "two". The noun being counted follows it in the genitive: sin n yirgazen "two men".

== Sample text ==
In Moulieras (Auguste), Les fourberies de Si Djeh'a.

Yiwen wass, Ǧeḥḥa yefka-yas baba-s frank, akken ad {d-yaɣ aqerruy n tixsi}. Yuɣ-it-id, yečča akk aksum-is. Yeqqim-d uceqlal d ilem, yewwi-yas-t-id i baba-s. Ihi, mi t-iwala yenna-yas: "acu-t wa?" yenna-yas: {"d aqerruy n tixsi".}
One day, Jehha he.gave-to.him father-his cent, so.that he.buys {head of ewe}. He.bought-it-here, he.ate all meat-its. Stayed-here carcass it.is empty, he.brought-to.him-it-here to father-his. Then, when it-he.saw he.said-to.him: "what-it that?" he.said-to.him: {"head of ewe".}
One day, Jehha's father gave him one cent, to buy a ewe head. He bought it, and ate it all till only an empty carcass was left and brought it to his father. When his father saw that, he said: "what is that?" Jehha said: "a ewe head".

-A ccmata, anida llan imeẓẓuɣen-is?
-Oh vile, where are ears-its?
-You vile (boy), where are its ears (the ewe)?

-Tella d taɛeẓẓugt.
-She.was it.is deaf.
-It was deaf.

-Anida llant wallen-is?
-Where are eyes-its?
-Where are its eyes?

-Tella d taderɣalt.
-She.was it.is blind.
-It was blind.

-Anida yella yiles-is?
-Where is tongue-its?
-Where is its tongue?

-Tella d tagugamt.
-She.was it.is dumb.
-It was dumb.

-I weglim n uqerruy-is, anida yella?
-And skin of head-its, where it.is?
-And the skin of its head, where is it?

-Tella d taferḍast.
-She.was it.is bald.
-It was bald.

Note: the predicative particle d was translated as "it.is", the particle of direction d was translated as "here".

Article 1 of the Universal Declaration of Human Rights

Akk imdanen llulen-d d illeliyen d imsawiyen deg ttart d yizerfan. Sεan taɣẓint d lfeqqa ; ilaq ad myiεawnen gar-asen deg ṛṛuḥ n tegmatt.

== Bibliography ==
- Abdel-Massih, Ernest T. (1971b). A Reference Grammar of Tamazight. Ann Arbor: University of Michigan. ISBN 0-932098-05-3.
- Achab, R. : 1996 – La néologie lexicale berbère (1945–1995), Paris/Louvain, Editions Peeters, 1996.
- Achab, R. : 1998 – Langue berbère. Introduction à la notation usuelle en caractères latins, Paris, Editions Hoggar.
- F. Amazit-Hamidchi & M. Lounaci : Kabyle de poche, Assimil, France, ISBN 2-7005-0324-4
- Benchabane, A. (2005). "Bouteflika ébranle la Kabylie" (in French). Algeria-Watch.
- Creissels, Denis (2006). The construct form of nouns in African languages: a typological approach (PDF). 36th Colloquium on African Languages and Linguistics. Archived from the original (PDF) on 2011-07-28.
- Dallet, Jean-Marie (1982). Dictionnaire kabyle-français: parler des At Mangellat, Algérie, Volume 1. Société d'études linguistiques et anthropologiques de France. ISBN 9782852971431. ISSN 0757-7699.
- Hamid Hamouma. n.d. Manuel de grammaire berbère (kabyle). Paris: Edition Association de Culture Berbère.
- Kamal Nait-Zerrad. Grammaire moderne du kabyle, tajerrumt tatrart n teqbaylit. Editions KARTHALA, 2001. ISBN 978-2-84586-172-5
- Lucas, Christopher (2007b), "Jespersen's Cycle in Arabic and Berber" (PDF), Transactions of the Philological Society, 105 (3): 398–431, doi:10.1111/j.1467-968X.2007.00189.x
- Mammeri, M. : 1976 – Tajerrumt n tmaziɣt (tantala taqbaylit), Maspero, Paris.
- Tas, I. : 2025 – Le kabyle en quelques règles, Paris.
- Naït-Zerrad, K. : 1994 – Manuel de conjugaison kabyle (le verbe en berbère), L’Harmattan, Paris.
- Naït-Zerrad, K. : 1995 – Grammaire du berbère contemporain, I – Morphologie, ENAG, Alger.
- Chaker, Salem (1983). Un parler berbère d'Algérie (Kabylie) : syntaxe (in French). Aix en Provence: Publications Université de Provence. ISBN 2-85399-075-3. OCLC 11317509.
- Tizi-Wwuccen. Méthode audio-visuelle de langue berbère (kabyle), Aix-en-Provence, Edisud, 1986.
