= Essabil =

Political party in Algeria

- Founder: Ali Rachedi
- Founded: January 2002

Essabil (Arabic: السبيل, "The Cause"), also known as the Democratic and Social Itinerary (Itinéraire Démocratique et Social, IDS), is a minor Algerian political party.

== History and profile ==
Eassabil was founded by Abdesslem Ali Rachedi in January 2002.
