= Algeria =

Country in North Africa

People's Democratic Republic of Algeria
(in official languages)
Arabic	الجمهورية الجزائرية الديمقراطية الشعبية al-Jumhūriyyah al-Jazāʾiriyyah ad-Dīmuqrāṭiyyah ash‑Shaʿbiyyah
Amazigh	Tagduda tazzayrit tamagdayt taɣerfant ⵜⴰⴳⴷⵓⴷⴰ ⵜⴰⵣⵣⴰⵢⵔⵉⵜ ⵜⴰⵎⴰⴳⴷⴰⵢⵜ ⵜⴰⵖⴻⵔⴼⴰⵏⵜ ثاڨدودا ثازايريث ثاماڨدايث ثاغيرفانث
- Flag Emblem
- Motto: بِالشَّعْبِ و لِلشَّعْبِ Bi-sh-shaʿb wa li-sh-shaʿb "By the people and for the people"
- Anthem: قَسَمًا; Qasaman "We Pledge"
- Capital and largest city: Algiers; 36°42′N 3°13′E
- Official languages: Arabic; Amazigh
- National vernacular: Algerian Arabic; Standard Algerian Amazigh
- Foreign languages: French; English
- Ethnic groups: See Ethnic groups
- Religion (2025): 98.2% Islam; 1.5% No religion; 0.3% Christianity
- Demonym: Algerian
- Government: Unitary semi-presidential republic
  - President: Abdelmadjid Tebboune
  - Prime Minister: Sifi Ghrieb
  - Council President: Azouz Nasri
  - Assembly President: Khalida Boufedeche
- Legislature: Parliament
  - Upper house: Council of the Nation
  - Lower house: People's National Assembly

Formation
  - Numidia: 202 BC
  - Mauro-Roman Kingdom: 429
  - Kingdom of the Aurès: 484
  - Rustamid dynasty: 777
  - Zirid dynasty: 972
  - Hammadid Emirate: 1014
  - Kingdom of Tlemcen: 1235
  - Regency of Algiers: 1516
  - French Algeria: 1830
  - Emirate of Abdelkader: 1832
  - Independence war and Provisional Government: 1 November 1954 – 19 March 1962
  - Independence: 5 July 1962

Area
  - Total: 2,381,741 km^{2} (919,595 sq mi) (10th)

Population
  - 2025 estimate: ▲47,400,000 (32nd)
  - Density: 19/km^{2} (49.2/sq mi) (206th)
- GDP (PPP): 2026 estimate
  - Total: ▲$947.065 billion (39th)
  - Per capita: ▲$19,719 (100th)
- GDP (nominal): 2026 estimate
  - Total: ▲$331.894 billion (49th)
  - Per capita: ▲$6,910 (111th)
- Gini (2011): 27.6 low inequality
- HDI (2023): ▲0.763 high (96th)
- Currency: Algerian dinar (DZD)
- Time zone: UTC+1 (CET)
- Calling code: +213
- ISO 3166 code: DZ
- Internet TLD: .dz; .الجزائر

Algeria, (Note: /ælˈdʒɪəriə/ al-JEER-ee-ə: Arabic: الجزائر, romanised: al-Jazāʾir, pronounced [æl.d͡ʒæzæːʔɪr] locally [(ɪ)ˈd͡ːzæːjɪr]; Standard Algerian Amazigh: Dzayer, ⴷⵣⴰⵢⴻⵔ, لزاير) officially the People's Democratic Republic of Algeria, (Note: Arabic: الجمهورية الجزائرية الديمقراطية الشعبية, romanised: al-Jumhūriyyah al-Jazāʾiriyyah ad-Dīmuqrāṭiyyah ash‑Shaʿbiyyah; Standard Algerian Berber: Tagduda tazzayrit tamagdayt taɣerfant ⵜⴰⴳⴷⵓⴷⴰ ⵜⴰⵣⵣⴰⵢⵔⵉⵜ ⵜⴰⵎⴰⴳⴷⴰⵢⵜ ⵜⴰⵖⴻⵔⴼⴰⵏⵜ ثاڨدودا ثازايريث ثاماڨدايث ثاغيرفانث (Note: The transcription of Tamazight in the Tifinagh alphabet is not codified.); Formerly also rendered as the Democratic and Popular Republic of Algeria in English, as seen on the 1981 Algiers Accords.) is a country in the Maghreb region of North Africa. It is bordered to the northeast by Tunisia; to the east by Libya; to the southeast by Niger; to the southwest by Mali, Mauritania, and Western Sahara; to the west by Morocco; and to the north by the Mediterranean Sea. Its capital and largest city is Algiers.

Algeria was shaped first by indigenous Amazigh societies, including the Numidians, whose kingdom became one of the earliest major states in the region, as well as by Phoenician, Roman, Vandal, and Byzantine influences. From the 7th century onward, the spread of Islam and arrival of Arab tribes gradually transformed the region, contributing to the development of a distinct Algerian identity rooted in both Arab, Islamic and Amazigh heritage. Between the 8th and 15th centuries, Algeria was ruled by a succession of local Islamic dynasties. In 1516, the Regency of Algiers was established, gradually emerging as a largely autonomous state owing nominal allegiance to the Ottoman Empire. After nearly three centuries as a major power in the Mediterranean, the country was invaded by France in 1830 and formally annexed in 1848, though it was not fully conquered and pacified until 1903. French rule brought mass European settlement that displaced the local population; by mid-1870, indigenous Algerians declined by up to a third due to warfare, disease, and starvation. French colonization faced continuous Algerian resistance, from Emir Abdelkader's campaigns and the Mokrani Revolt to the rise of nationalist movements in the 20th century. The Sétif and Guelma massacre in 1945 catalysed local resistance that culminated in the outbreak of the Algerian War in 1954. Algeria gained independence in 1962. It descended into a bloody civil war from 1992 to 2002, remaining in an official state of emergency until the 2010–2012 Algerian protests during the Arab Spring.

Algeria is a semi-arid country spanning over 2,381,741 square kilometres (919,595 sq mi) with a population of 47 million, making it the tenth largest in the world and the tenth-most populous country in Africa. The Sahara covers most of Algeria except for the fertile and mountainous north, where the population is concentrated. Its official languages are Arabic and Amazigh, while the vast majority of the population speak Algerian Arabic. French is also influential, although it has no official status and is gradually being replaced by English as the primary foreign language. Most Algerians identify as Arabs, while Berbers form a sizeable minority. Sunni Islam is the official religion and practiced by 99% of the population.

Algeria is a semi-presidential republic. Algeria is a member of various regional and international organizations. It is a regional power in North Africa and a middle power in global affairs, with the largest military budget in Africa. Algeria has the highest Human Development Index in continental Africa, and the third largest economy in Africa. Its petroleum and natural gas reserves are globally the sixteenth and ninth largest respectively.

== Etymology ==
The name Algeria ultimately derives from the city of Algiers, whose Arabic name, al-Jazāʾir (الجزائر, meaning "the islands"), referenced the islands once located off the city's coast. The modern state took its name from the Regency of Algiers, an Ottoman polity established in the central Maghreb during the early 16th century. Under Ottoman rule, a political and administrative structure gradually emerged and helped define the territory and borders of Algeria. Contemporary sources referred to the land as Watan al-Jazāʾir (وطن الجزائر, "the country of Algiers"), while the Ottoman Turkish aristocracy settled in the region identified both itself and the local population as "Algerians."

== History ==
=== Prehistory and ancient history ===
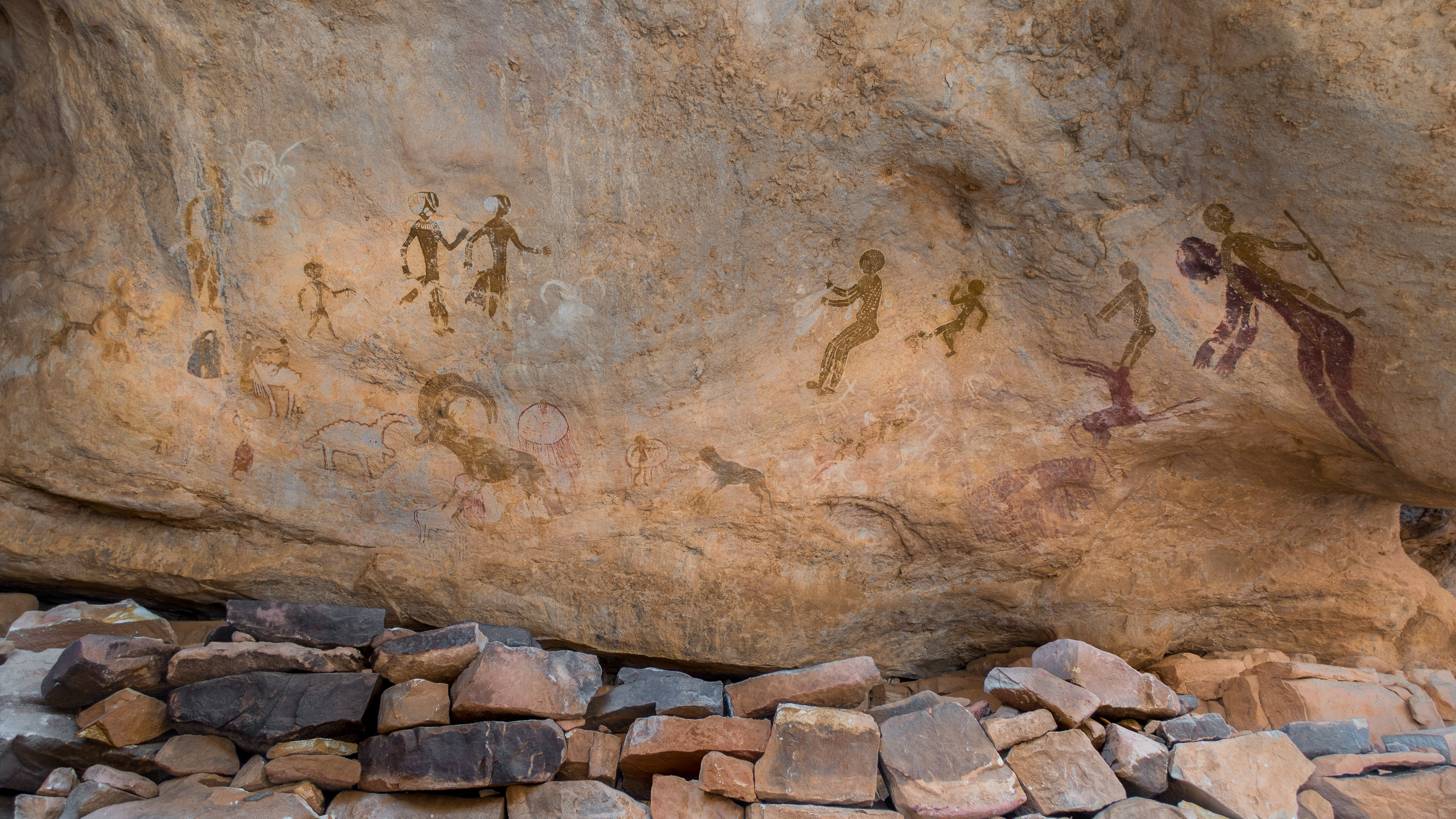
Rock art in the Tassili n’Ajjer plateau of Algeria has been dated to seven to 10 thousand years ago

Stone artifacts and cut-marked bones that were excavated from two deposits at Ain Boucherit are estimated to be ~1.9 million years old, and even older stone artifacts to be as old as ~2.4 million years. Hence, the Ain Boucherit evidence shows that ancestral hominins inhabited the Mediterranean fringe in northern Africa much earlier than previously thought. The evidence strongly argues for early dispersal of stone tool manufacture and use from East Africa, or a possible multiple-origin scenario of stone technology in both East and North Africa.

Neanderthal tool makers produced hand axes in the Levalloisian and Mousterian styles (43,000 BC) similar to those in the Levant. Algeria was the site of the highest state of development of Middle Paleolithic Flake tool techniques. Tools of this era, starting about 30,000 BC, are called Aterian.

The earliest blade industries in North Africa are called Iberomaurusian (located mainly in the Oran region). This industry appears to have spread throughout the coastal regions of the Maghreb between 15,000 and 10,000 BC. Neolithic civilisation (animal domestication and agriculture) developed in the Saharan and Mediterranean Maghreb perhaps as early as 11,000 BC or as late as between 6000 and 2000 BC. This life, richly depicted in the Tassili n'Ajjer paintings, predominated in Algeria until the classical period. The mixture of peoples of North Africa coalesced eventually into a distinct native population that came to be called Berbers, who are the indigenous peoples of northern Africa.

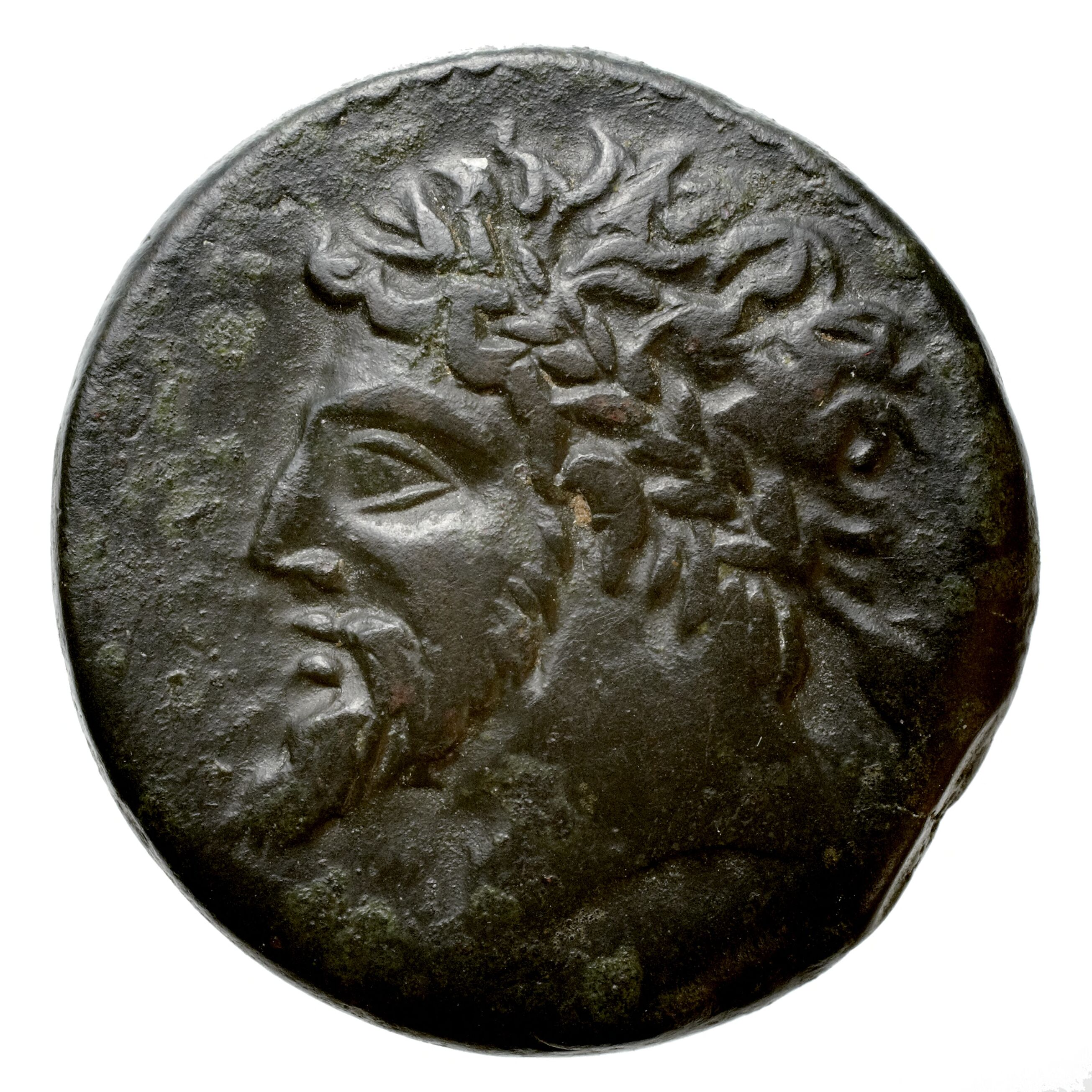
Numidian coin of King Masinissa

The Carthaginians expanded and established small settlements along the North African coast; by 600 BC, a Phoenician presence existed in the Algerian coast, such as Icosium in modern-day Algiers and Hippo Regius. These settlements served as market towns and anchorages. The Carthaginians avoided conquering the strong Berber tribes in the interior. Instead, they collected tribute, focused on trade, and maintained friendly relations. The Berbers supplied them with goods, slaves, and skilled cavalry through trans-Saharan networks. Carthaginian culture strongly influenced nearby Berber tribes, who adopted many of its elements.

As Carthaginian power grew, its impact on the indigenous population increased dramatically. By the fifth century BC, Berbers in what is now Algeria had developed mixed farming and pastoral economies, advanced manufacturing, trade and political organisation supported several states. By the third century BC, two major Berber kingdoms existed: the Masaesyli (from the Moulouya River in eastern Morocco to the Rhummel in Algeria) and the Massyli (in extreme eastern Algeria and western Tunisia). In 203–202 BC, Masinissa of the Massyli, after being supported by Rome and playing a key role in the Battle of Zama against Carthaginian general Hannibal, defeated his western rivals (including Syphax) and unified the territories into the Kingdom of Numidia. Stretching from Tabarka in Tunisia to the Moulouya River, with its capital at Constantine, Numidia was a high point of Berber civilization. Masinissa promoted agriculture, built a strong army and navy, and was praised by ancient writers as an exceptional ruler. After Masinissa's death in 148 BC, succession struggles arose. His grandson Jugurtha (r. 118–106 BC) reunified Numidia through ruthless means but provoked Rome through conflict and the massacre of Roman citizens at Constantine. Despite resistance, Jugurtha was defeated and captured in 106 BC with the betrayal of his father-in-law Bocchus of Mauretania.

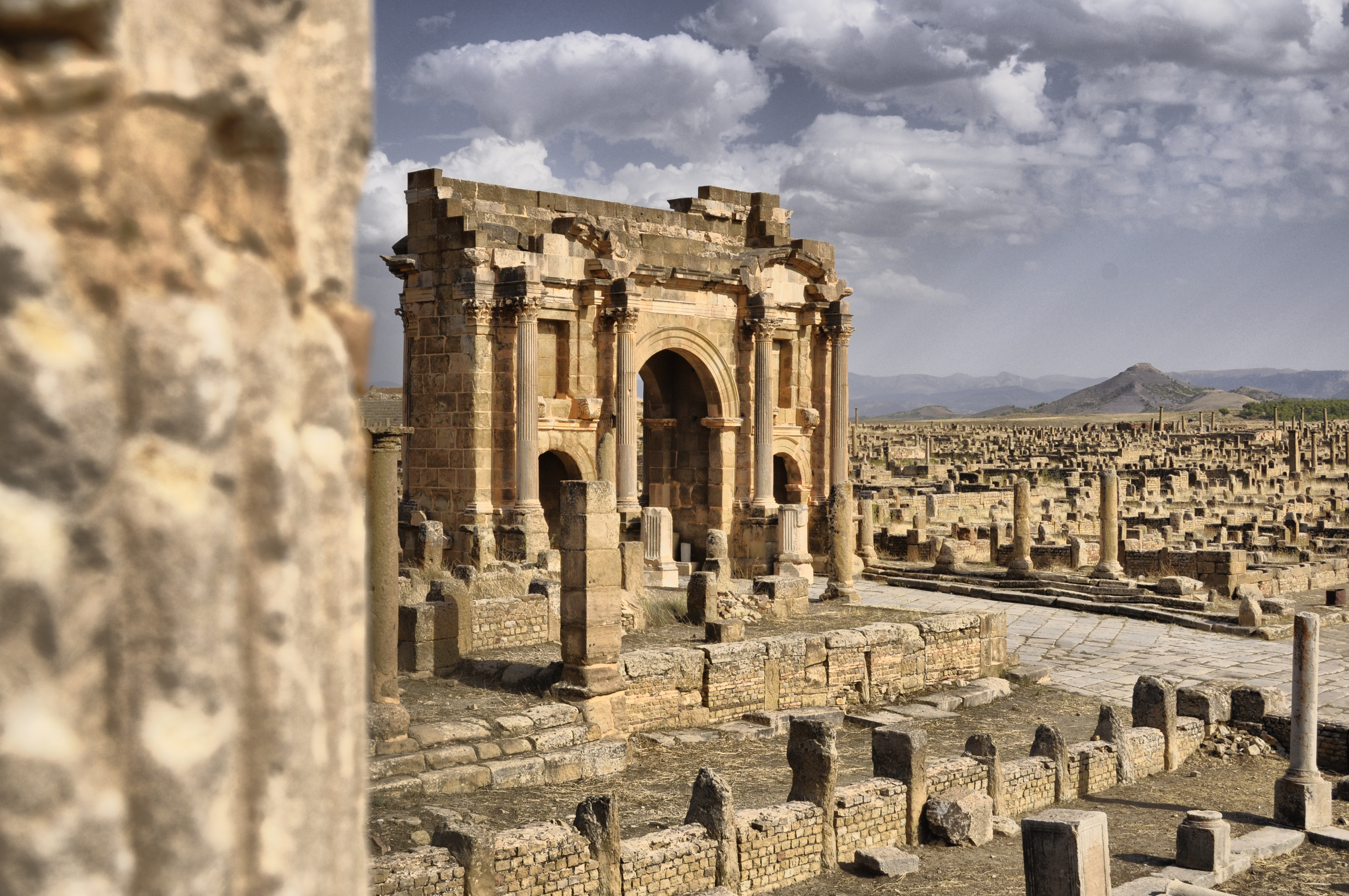
The Arch of Trajan in the Roman ruins of Timgad

Rome built alliances in North Africa against Carthage. However, it gradually tightened control by first turning Numidia into a protectorate, then dividing and weakening it. Later Berber client kings, such as Juba I, continued to rule diminished territories. Augustus installed Juba II (r. 25 BC–c. 23 AD), a highly cultured scholar and husband of Cleopatra Selene, as client king of Mauretania, bringing a period of prosperity. In 40 AD, Emperor Caligula executed Juba II's son Ptolemy. Following a subsequent Berber revolt, Rome imposed direct rule, dividing the territory into provinces (Mauretania Caesariensis, Mauretania Tingitana, and Africa Proconsularis).

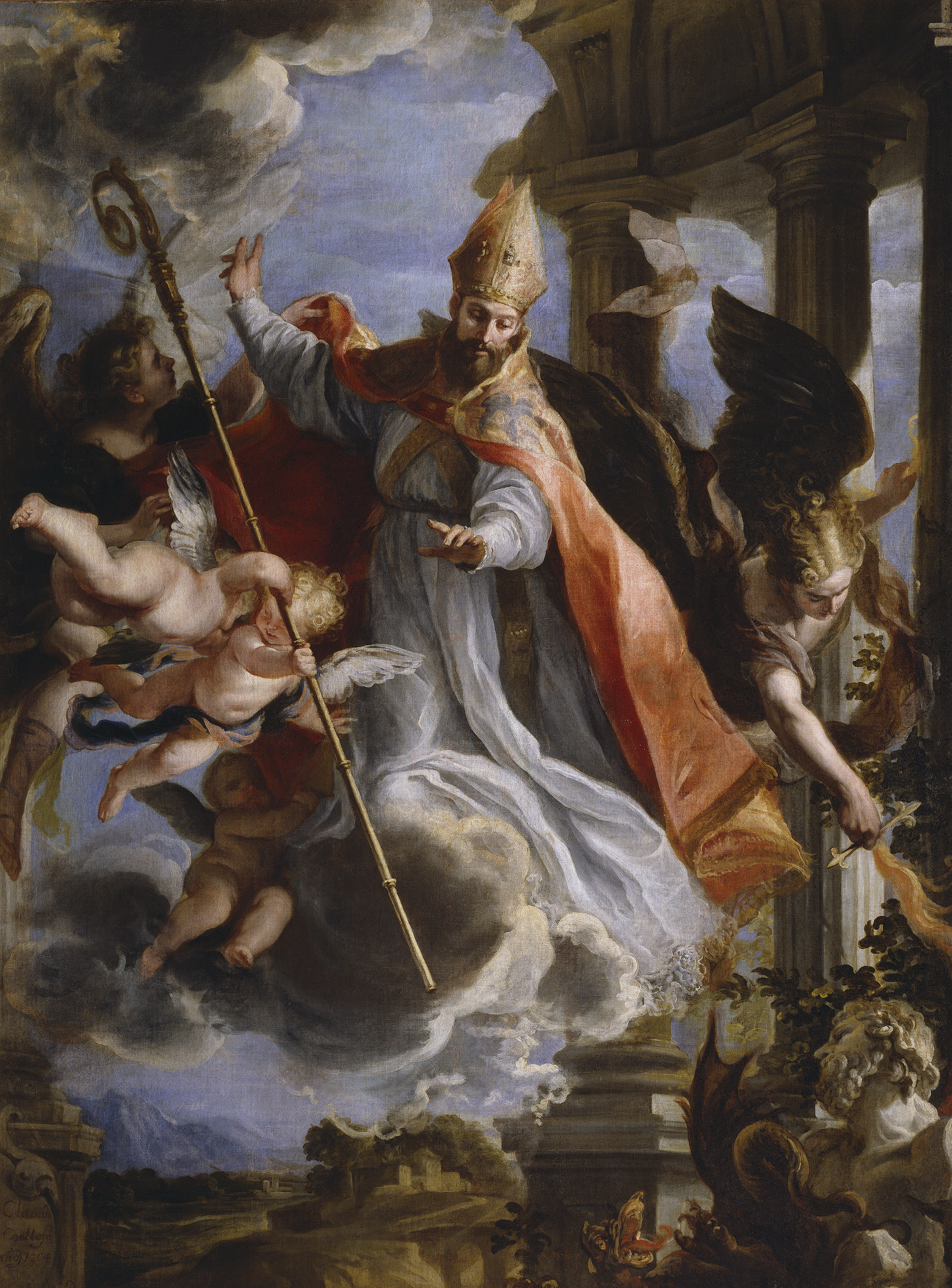
Saint Augustine of Hippo; emblematic Christian theologian and bishop of Numidian origin.

Rome extensively integrated local elites: the Severan dynasty (192–235 AD) was of African origin, and Emperor Macrinus was born in Caesarea around 165 AD. He became Praetorian prefect, assassinated Caracalla in 217, and ruled for about 15 months. At its height, 90 out of 600 Roman senators came from North Africa. While Rome brought in settlers and established colonies of veterans, its presence primarily promoted the assimilation of locals, who preserved their languages and many traditions while adapting them to Roman gods. The Romans helped create and develop cities that relied heavily on local contributions. Nevertheless, Roman rule had a negative long-term impact on Berber society. While coastal areas saw grand Roman construction, much of the interior was turned into grain-exporting latifundia, pushing Berbers into the hinterland where they retribalized and resisted for generations. Christianity spread in the 3rd–4th centuries. Its most prominent Berber figures were Saint Augustine, the bishop of Hippo Regius (modern-day Annaba, Algeria) and his mother, Saint Monica. However, Christianity rapidly declined among Berbers after being associated with Roman exploitation, especially following the suppression of the Donatist movement.

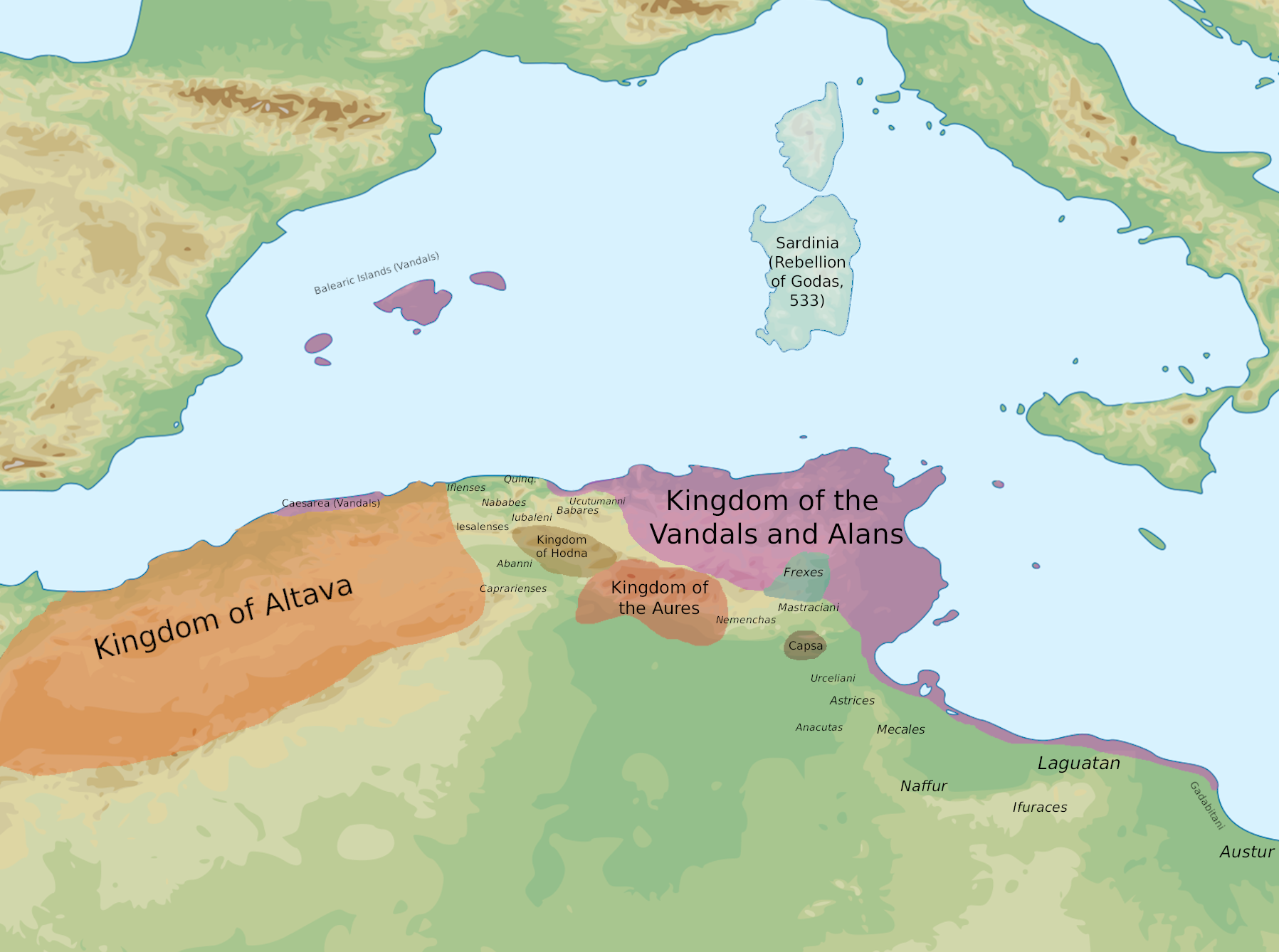
The Vandal and Moorish Kingdoms, early 6th century.

By the time the Vandals ended Roman control in 429 AD, most of Algeria had returned to Berber tribal rule. Under King Genseric, the Vandal Kingdom successfully defended Carthage against two Byzantine expeditions from Constantinople in 460 and 468. A peace treaty in 474 brought several decades of stability. This period ended when Gelimer deposed his cousin Hilderic and seized power. In 533, Emperor Justinian I, seeking to restore the Roman Empire, launched a major campaign against the Vandals. A large fleet commanded by General Belisarius sailed from Constantinople. After landing near Carthage, Belisarius decisively defeated the Vandals in two battles, occupied Carthage, and captured King Gelimer, who was exiled to Anatolia. Many Vandals were enslaved or expelled from North Africa.

Byzantine rule in Africa was limited mainly to the provinces of Byzacena, Proconsular Africa, and Numidia. While some urban life persisted, rural areas suffered from heavy taxation, frequent revolts, and insecurity. The devastating Justinian Plague further weakened the region. The Byzantines then faced resistance from the Moorish tribes of the Aurès Mountains. Governor Solomon defeated them and reinforced control through an extensive fortification program, but he was killed in battle near Tebessa in 543. General John Troglita later restored a fragile peace, granting significant autonomy to the Moorish kingdoms. The most prominent of these were the Mauro-Roman and Altava Kingdoms. A growing sense of local autonomy emerged, exemplified by the powerful governor Gregory the Patrician (from 646), who minted his own coins and moved the capital to Sufetula (Sbeitla).

=== Middle Ages ===
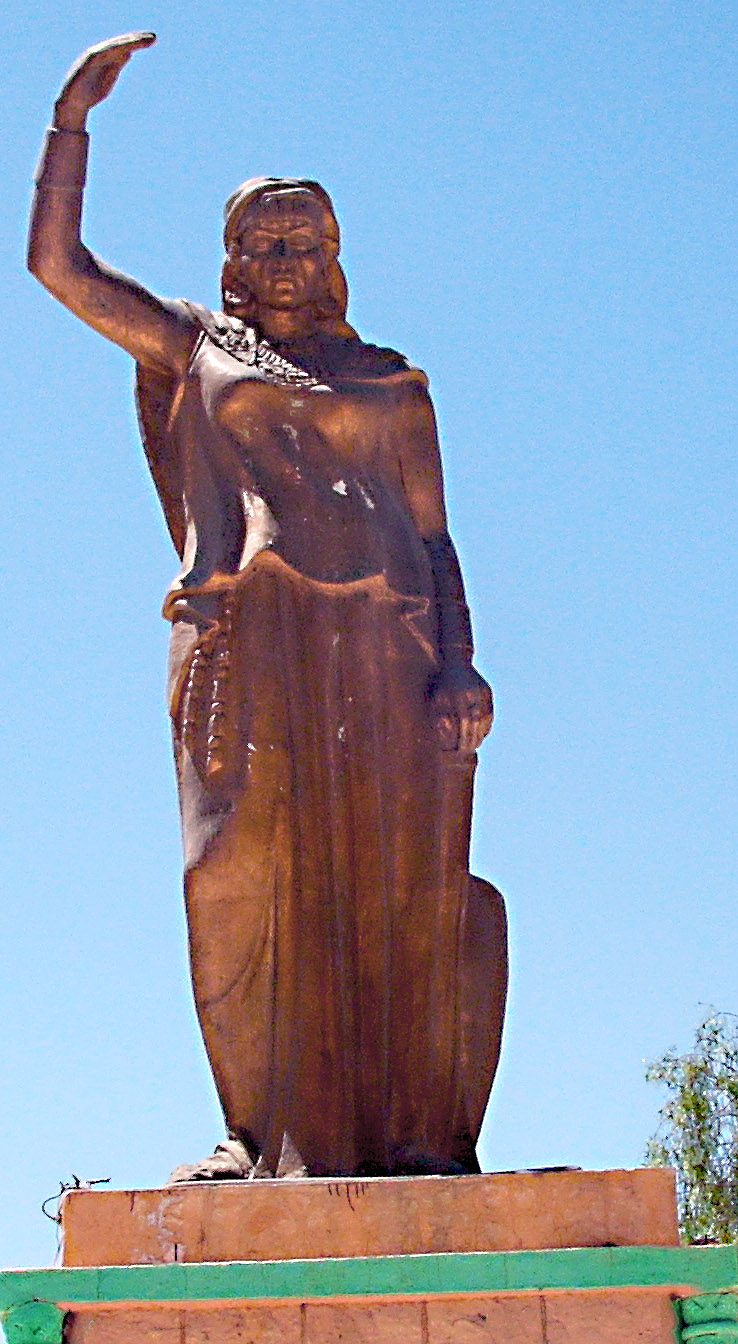
Dihya memorial in Khenchela, Algeria

The Muslim conquest of the Maghreb took place between 647 and 709, marking the Arab-Islamic expansion into North Africa, which was then divided between Byzantine-controlled coastal territories and independent Berber kingdoms and tribes in the interior. The conquest unfolded in three main phases and ultimately brought most of the region under Umayyad Caliphate control.

The first invasion (647–648), led by Abd Allah ibn Sa'd under Caliph Uthman, targeted the Exarchate of Carthage. The Arabs defeated the Byzantine patrician Gregory at the Battle of Sufetula, weakening Byzantine authority in Ifriqiya. However, the campaign did not extend beyond raiding. After a period of civil war in the Muslim world, a second wave began around 665–689. Oqba ibn Nafi played a central role: in 670, he founded the city of Kairouan, which became a major Islamic base and cultural centre. He led ambitious campaigns deep into the interior, reportedly reaching the Atlantic coast, but faced strong resistance from Byzantine and Berber forces. A coalition led by the Berber leader Kusayla ambushed and killed Oqba at the Battle of Tahouda in 683. Kusayla temporarily captured Kairouan before being defeated.

The third and decisive phase (697–709) was led by Hassan ibn al-Nu'man and later Musa ibn Nusayr. Hassan recaptured and destroyed Carthage in 697 after fierce fighting against Byzantine reinforcements. A major Berber resistance then emerged under the legendary queen Kahina (Dihya), who initially defeated the Arabs in the Aurès Mountains. However, Hassan returned with fresh troops, defeated and killed Kahina around 697. Musa ibn Nusayr completed the conquest of the western Maghreb, subduing Berber tribes, capturing Tangier, and integrating many converted Berbers into the Muslim army. By 709, the entire Maghreb was under Umayyad control.

Following the Berber general Tariq ibn Ziyad's conquest of Visigothic Spain in 711, Islam had already spread throughout North Africa, and Berbers actively participated in raids into Europe, reaching as far as Lyon and Autun in France. However, Berber converts were still treated as second-class non-Arabs; the difficult conquest of the Maghreb prompted the Umayyads to impose heavy taxation and oppressive governance. Attracted by ideals of equality and religious purity, many Berbers supported Kharijite movements, triggering frequent revolts in Ifriqiya.

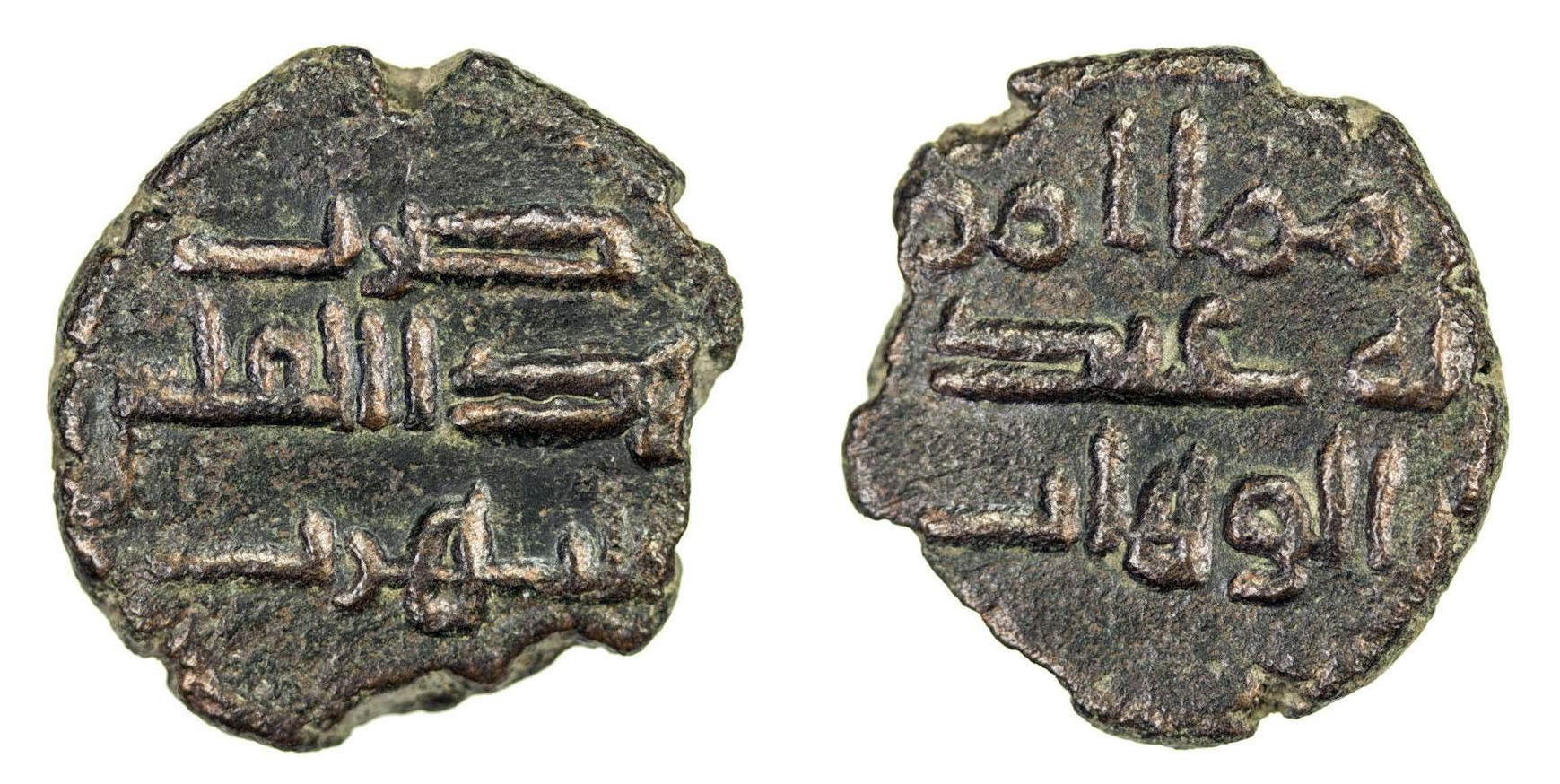
Rustumid Coin - Fals Abd al-Wahab ibn Rustam (c. 788-824)

Following the Berber revolt numerous independent states emerged across the Maghreb. In 778, Abdel Rahman Ibn Rustam established a Kharijite emirate at Tahert in central Algeria known as the Rustamid imamate, marking the first independent Muslim state in the Maghrib. At its peak, the kingdom extended from Tlemcen to Tripoli. It prospered through trans-Saharan trade. The Rustamids faced constant threats from the Aghlabids, backed by the Abbasid Caliphate, in the east, and the Alid Idrisids in the west. Due to the strict religious nature of Ibadi society, the imams frequently dealt with internal rebellions, which weakened their authority unless the ruler was particularly charismatic. The dynasty was defeated by the Fatimids in 909, prompting the Ibadis to settle in the M'zab region.

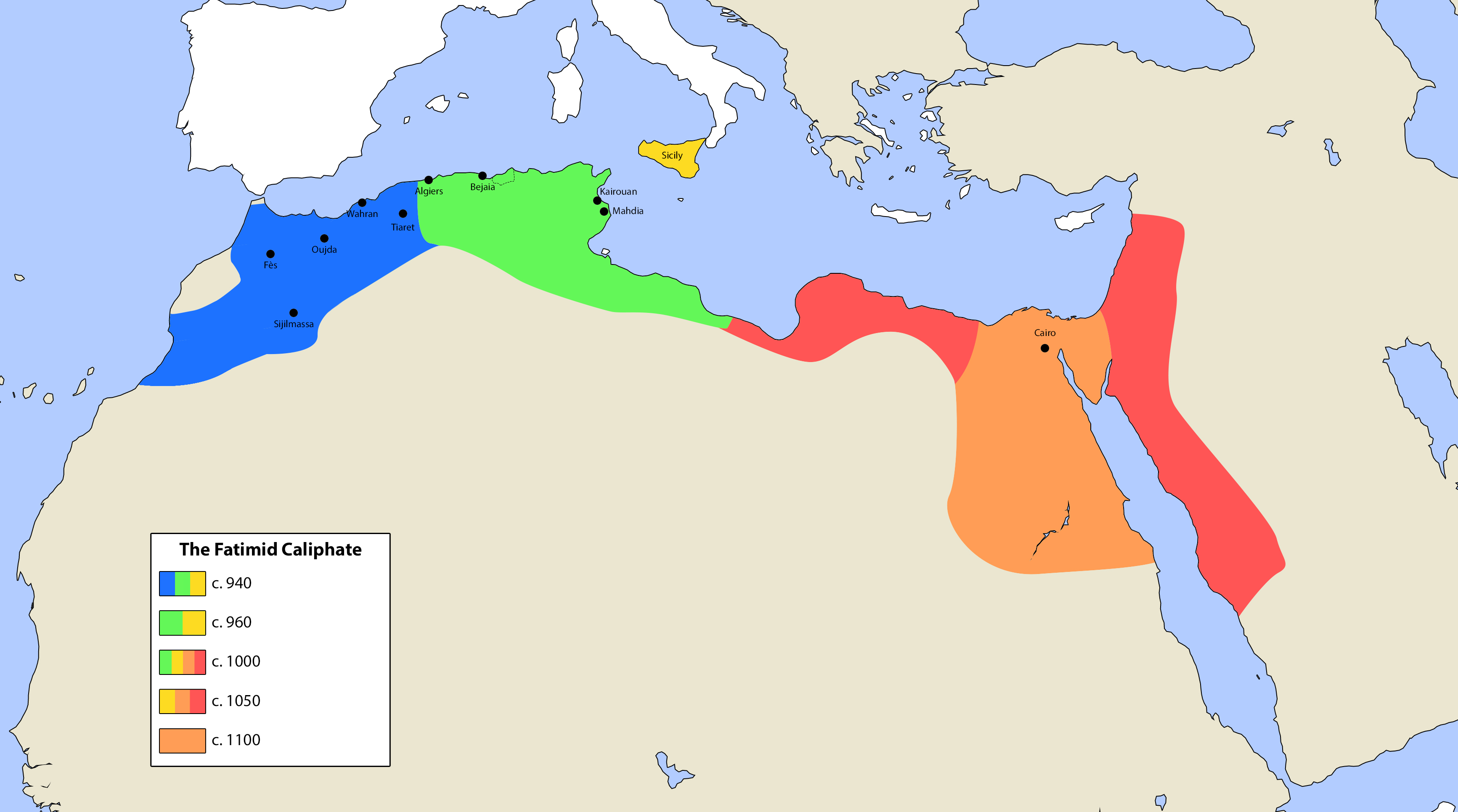
Fatimid Caliphate, a Shia Ismaili dynasty that ruled much of North Africa, c. 960–1100

The Fatimid da'wa entered the Maghreb through the skilled Ismaili Shia missionary Abu Abdullah al-San'ani (al-Shi'i), who arrived around 900 and settled among the Kabyle Kutama Berbers near Sétif. He gradually gained their support through preaching the coming of the Mahdi, organized them militarily, and succeeded in overthrowing the Aghlabid dynasty. In 909, he captured Kairouan and prepared the ground for the Fatimid state. He then liberated Ubayd Allah al-Mahdi from prison in Sijilmasa and handed him power. Al-Mahdi declared himself Caliph in 910, becoming the founder of the Fatimid Caliphate in Ifriqiya (Tunisia). The Fatimids imposed Ismaili Shia doctrine, faced strong opposition from the Sunni Maliki population, and dealt with several revolts, especially the major rebellion of Abu Yazid (the Man of the Donkey).

The Fatimids built a powerful army and navy and achieved military successes. They maintained control of Sicily, raided northern Italy (934–935 and 1004–1015), and developed a prosperous economy there, with many mosques, sugar cane, papyrus, and cotton production that rivalled Spain. In this way, the Fatimids established a powerful North African empire that would not be rivalled until the rise of the Almoravids and Almohads.

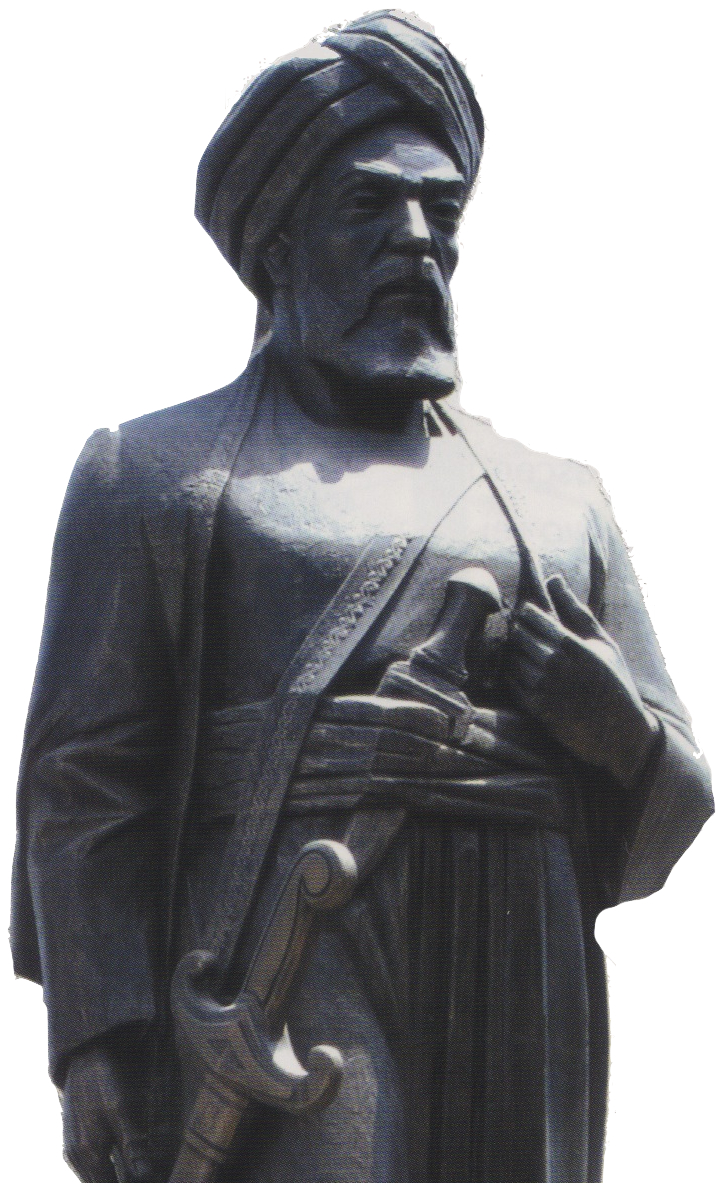
Statut of Bologhine ibn Ziri founder of the Zirid dynasty

After the Fatimids transferred their capital to Egypt in 971, they appointed Buluggin ibn Ziri, a Sanhaja Berber leader, as their governor over Ifriqiya and the central Maghreb. This marked the beginning of the Zirid Dynasty], which ruled from Achir. Buluggin founded the cities of Algiers, Médéa and Miliana, making central Algeria politically important. He then expanded his authority across Algeria and most of Morocco briefly, fighting Zenata tribes. Under al-Mu'izz ibn Badis, the Zirids cut ties with the Shia Fatimids in 1043, adopted Sunni Islam, and recognized the Abbasid Caliphate. In retaliation, the Fatimids sent the Arab tribes of Banū Hilāl and Banū Sulaym, whose invasion caused widespread destruction, especially in Kairouan. The Zirid state gradually weakened and fragmented.

A branch of the family, led by Hammad ibn Buluggin, broke away and established the Hammadid Dynasty in central Algeria. Their first capital was Qal'at Bani Hammad, later moving to Béjaïa, which became a major city. The Hammadids developed a strong navy, promoted agriculture, industry, trade, and culture. Cities like Al-Qal’a' and Béjaïa flourished with scholars, poets, and architects. However, the dynasty suffered from internal divisions, revolts, attacks by the Almoravids, and Genoese raids on the coast. The Hammadids were finally defeated by Abd al-Mu'min, the founder of the Almohad Caliphate, in 1152.

The Almoravids, a puritanical religious-military movement of Sanhaja Berbers, mainly the Lamtuna tribe, from the Mauritanian Sahara, was founded in the mid-11th century by the Maliki scholar Abdallah ibn Yasin. The movement emphasized strict adherence to Maliki Sunni Islam. Under leaders like Yusuf ibn Tashfin, they built a powerful empire, establishing Marrakesh as their capital in 1062. They conquered much of western and central Algeria, and defeated the Ghana Empire in the south. They also intervened in al-Andalus, defeating Christian forces and extending their rule there. The Almoravids strengthened Maliki Islam and brought Andalusian cultural influence to the Maghreb, but their rigid legalism later contributed to their downfall. They were overthrown by the Almohads.

The Almohads were a reformist movement founded by Muhammad ibn Tumart, a Masmuda Berber who proclaimed himself the Mahdi. They emphasized the absolute unity of God (Tawhid) and opposed what they viewed as Almoravid religious errors. Abd al-Mu'min became the first Almohad Caliph and completed the conquest of the Maghreb by 1147, unifying it for the first time. In Algeria, they ended the Hammadid dynasty. The empire reached its peak under Abu Yaqub Yusuf and Yaqub al-Mansur, who patronized philosophy (including Ibn Rushd and Ibn Tufayl), arts, and architecture, while maintaining control in al-Andalus. However, major defeats against Christian forces, especially at Las Navas de Tolosa in 1212, and internal divisions led to the empire's collapse. By the mid-13th century, the Almohad state fragmented, giving rise to the Hafsids in Ifriqiya, the Zayyanids in Tlemcen, and the Marinids in Fez.

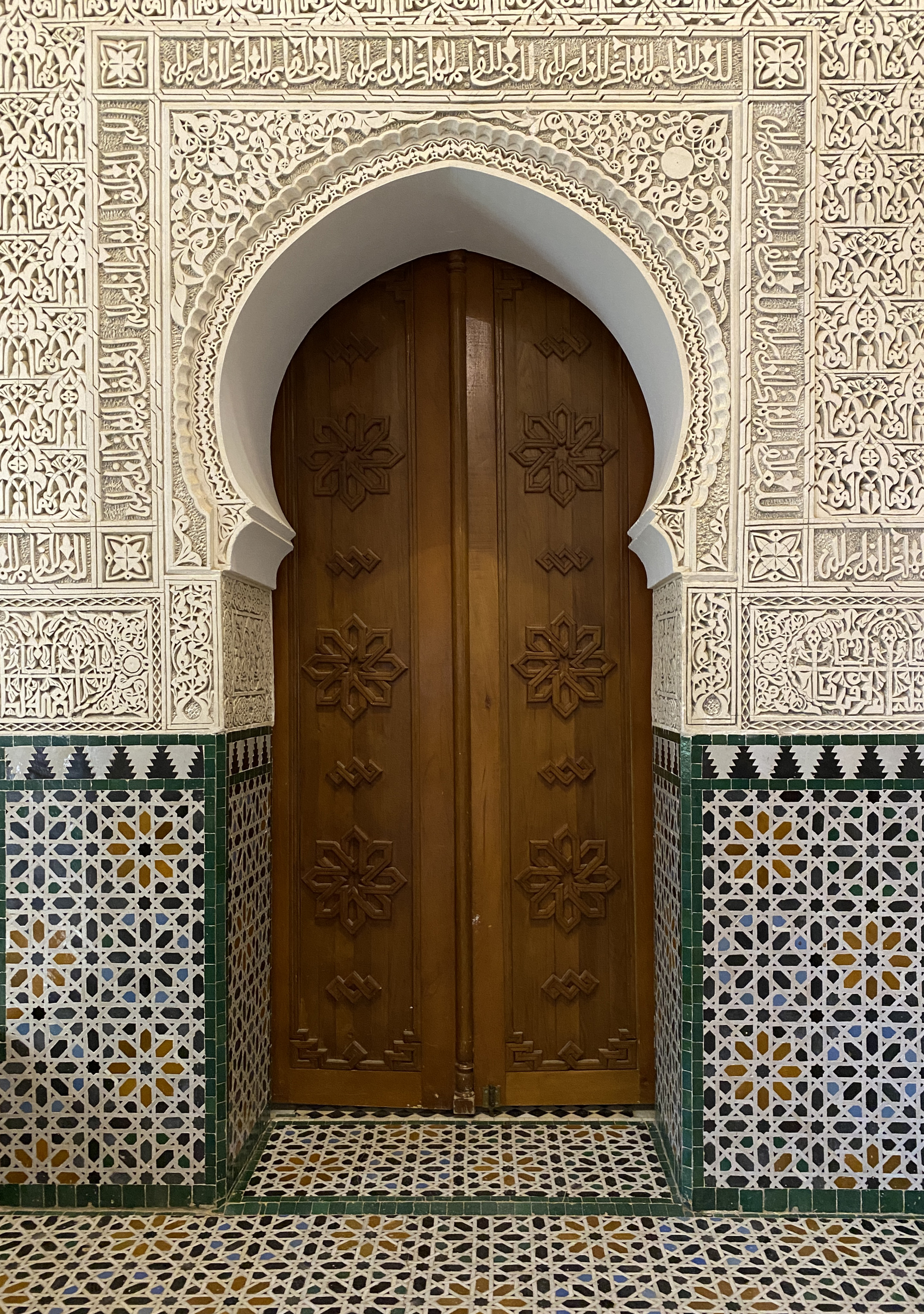
Door in El Mechouar Palace, Tlemcen, Algeria

Following the collapse of the Almohad Empire, Yaghmurasen ibn Zayyan founded a Zanata Berber dynasty known as the Zayyanid dynasty, which ruled the central Maghrib from 1236 to 1550. The dynasty produced 27 rulers and made Tlemcen its capital. The Zayyanids generally used the title of emir, though some adopted shaykh or khalifa. Their administration included qadis and wazirs. Due to its location on the trans-Saharan trade routes, Tlemcen flourished as a major political, economic, and cultural centre. Zayyanid rulers actively supported learning by constructing mosques and madrasas, turning their capital into an important theological and intellectual hub. Their history is relatively well documented, particularly through the works of the historian Ibn Khaldun.

The kingdom was constantly threatened by its powerful neighbours, the Marinids of Morocco to the west and the Hafsids of Ifriqiya to the east, while also facing internal family intrigues and hostility from rival tribes. Several rulers stood out in the 14th century, notably Abu Hammu I (1308–1318), who restored Tlemcen and expanded influence eastward; Abu Tashfin I (1318–1337), a patron of education and literature who died defending the city against the Marinids; Abu Hammu II (1359–1389), known for his resilience in recovering Tlemcen multiple times; and his son Abu Tashfin II, who conspired against him, making Tlemcen a Marinid vassal. Over time, the dynasty weakened due to endless external conflicts and internal betrayals, with the last Zayyanid rulers becoming Spanish then Ottoman vassals.

=== Modern history ===
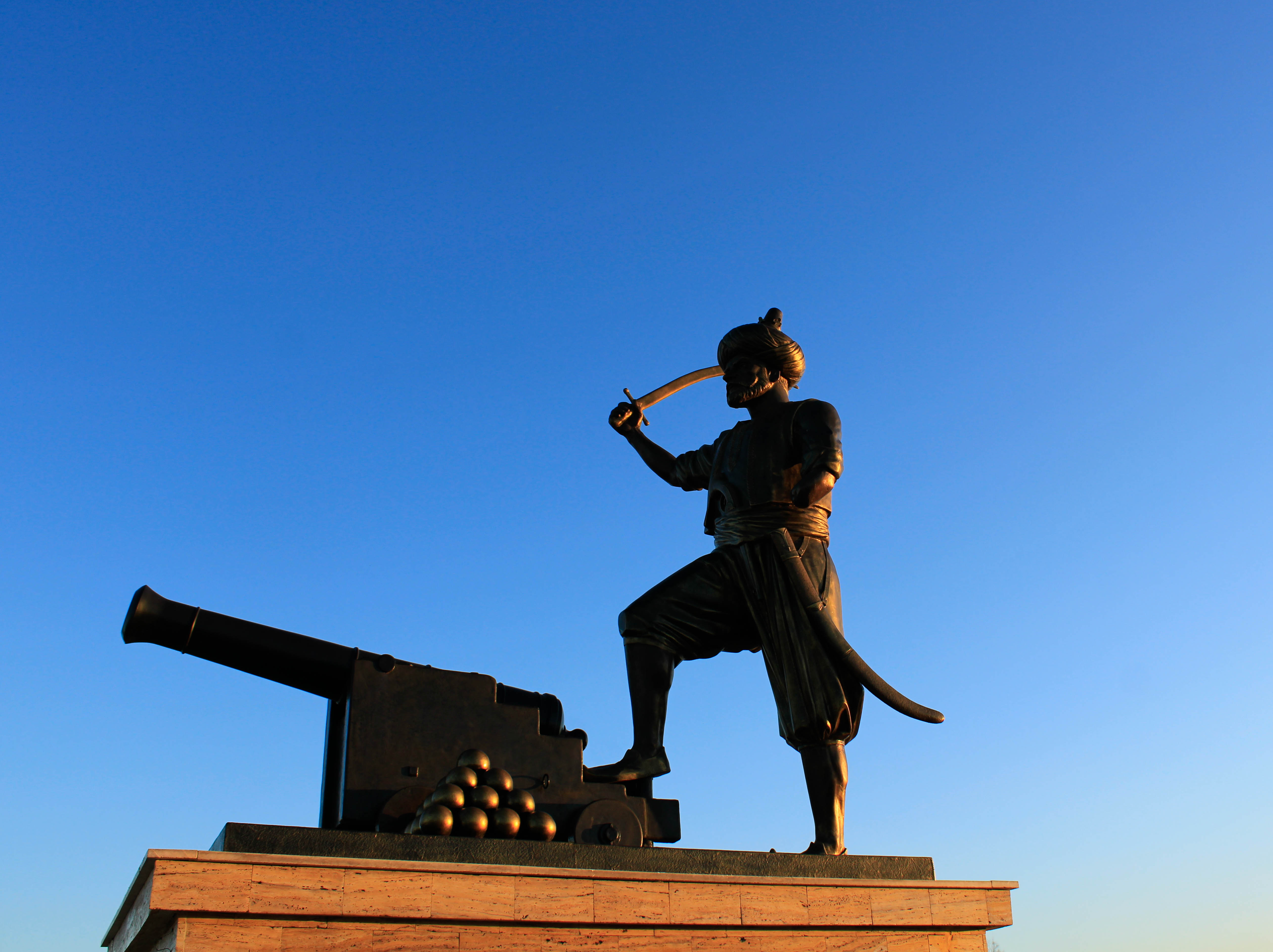
Aruj Reis' monument in Aïn Témouchent.

The Regency of Algiers was founded in 1516 by the corsair brothers Aruj Barbarossa and Hayreddin Barbarossa, who seized Algiers with local support against Spanish expansion and made the territory a protectorate of the Ottomans. Although nominally loyal to the Ottoman sultan, the Regency gradually evolved into an autonomous "imperial state" with complex local administration.

Over the centuries, power shifted through several ruling systems: beylerbeys appointed by Istanbul, then pashas and aghas, before the era of the deys began in 1671. In practice, authority often rested with the Odjak janissaries and the ta'ifa of corsair captains, while the dey ruled through negotiation with military elites. Historians have described the Regency as a "military republic".

The Regency became one of the major Mediterranean naval powers during the 16th and 17th centuries. Its economy relied on privateering, slave-taking, ransom, manufacturing, tribute payments, agriculture and maritime trade. Corsair fleets operating from Algiers attacked European shipping across the Mediterranean and even into the Atlantic, forcing major European powers to pay tribute or negotiate treaties. The city itself became wealthy and heavily fortified, especially after failed European expeditions such as the 1541 attack of Emperor Charles V. The Casbah was built during this period.

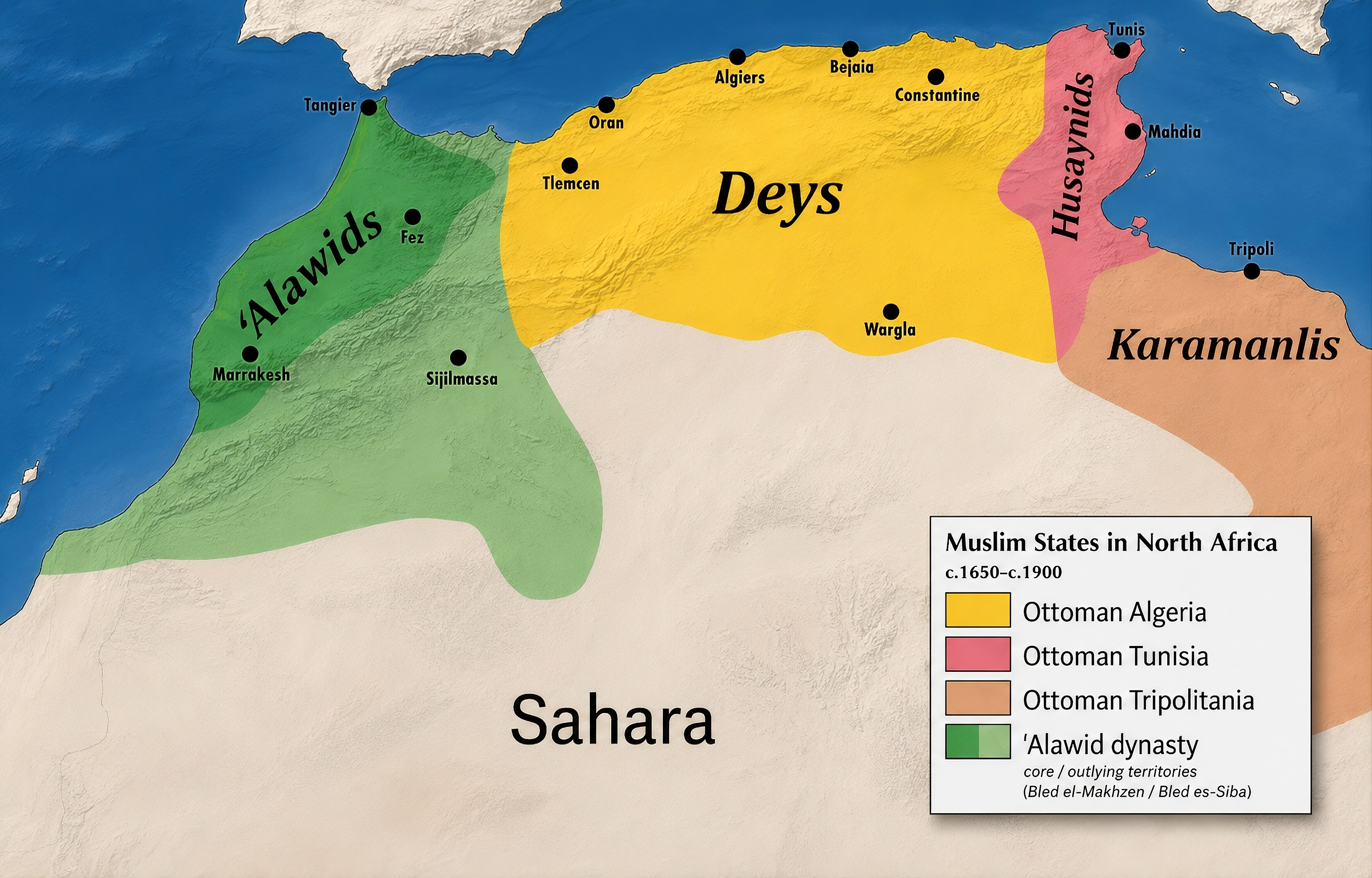
Ottoman Algeria and its neighbouring states in 17th-19th centuries.

Internally, the Regency expanded its authority to most of modern Algeria while allowing considerable autonomy to regional leaders. Political and military power in Algeria was dominated by the Turks, while locals mainly served as taxpayers, soldiers, merchants and religious officials. Socially, Algeria resembled pre-Revolutionary southern European societies, with a powerful aristocracy, a poor peasantry, a weak middle class, and little influence from Enlightenment ideas. Tensions sometimes emerged between the Turkish janissary elite, local populations, and the ethnically mixed Kouloughlis, leading to instability. Although dissatisfaction with Ottoman injustice and corruption was widespread, it was counterbalanced by religious loyalty to the Ottoman Caliphate, gratitude for Ottoman protection against the Spanish, fear of European ambitions, strong cultural links, and the absence of a strong middle class or national unity. Algerian society was deeply influenced by religion and absolute rule, with education centered on religious studies under clerical authority.

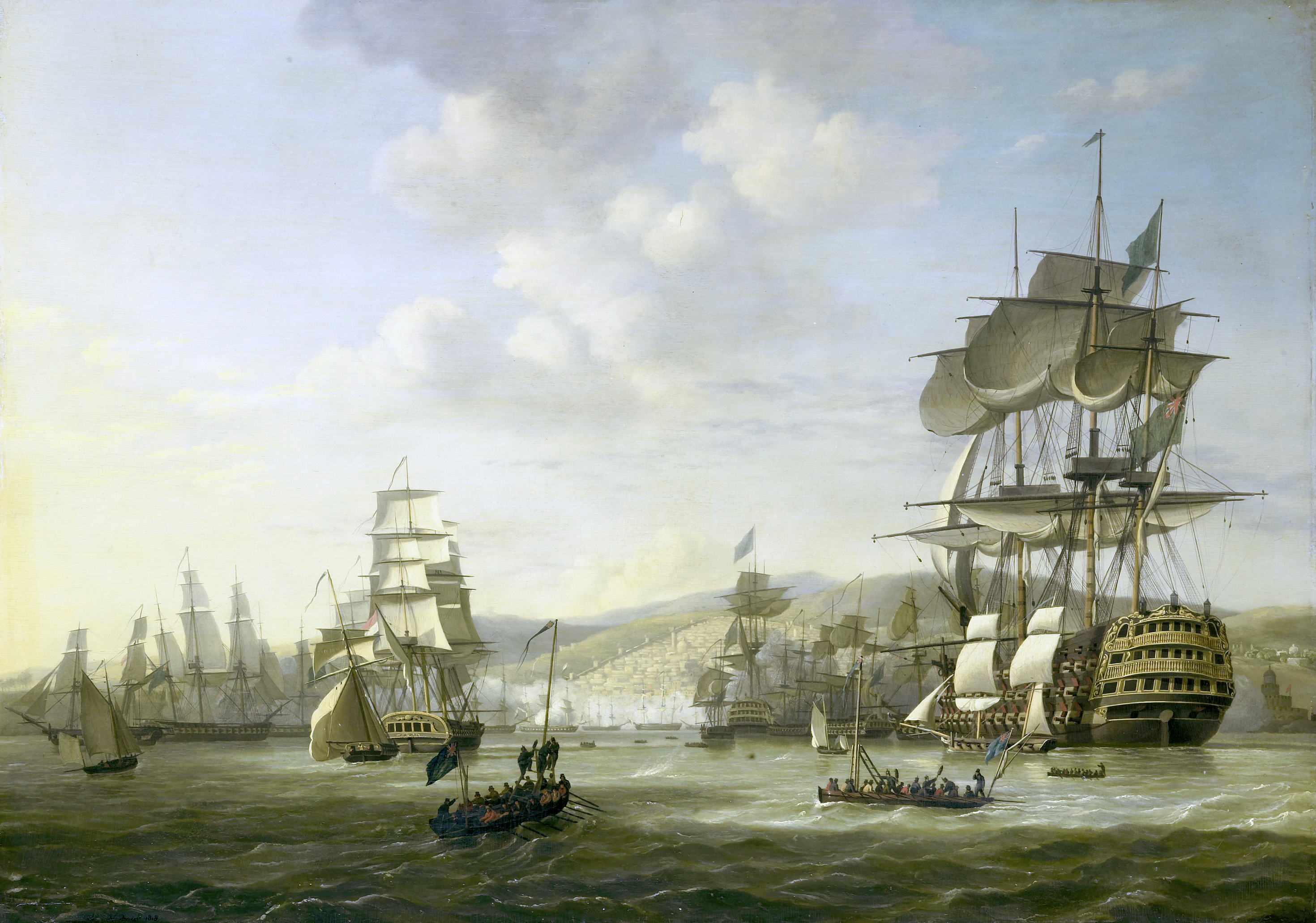
Bombardment of Algiers by the Anglo-Dutch fleet, August 1816

Algiers maintained diplomacy with European powers and acted independently from the Ottomans, especially after the janissary coup of 1659 and the consolidation of dey rule in the 18th century. By the early 19th century, the Regency began to decline because of European naval superiority, the weakening of corsair warfare, internal unrest, economic difficulties, repeated bombardments, the Barbary Wars, and the Anglo-Dutch bombardment of Algiers. It was forced to offer concessions to Western powers. Relations with France deteriorated after the 1827 Fly-Whisk Incident, when Dey Hussein struck the French consul during a financial dispute ]. France used the event to invade in 1830, capturing Algiers and ending the Regency. Resistance continued in Constantine under Ahmed Bey until 1837.

The Regency period was a foundational stage of Algerian statehood and national consciousness: unifying much of the territory and developing enduring political institutions. Historian Abou el-Kacem Saadallah refers to the Regency as the "Algerian Ancien régime". Historian Ahmad Tawfiq al-Madani said it was the "first Algerian state".

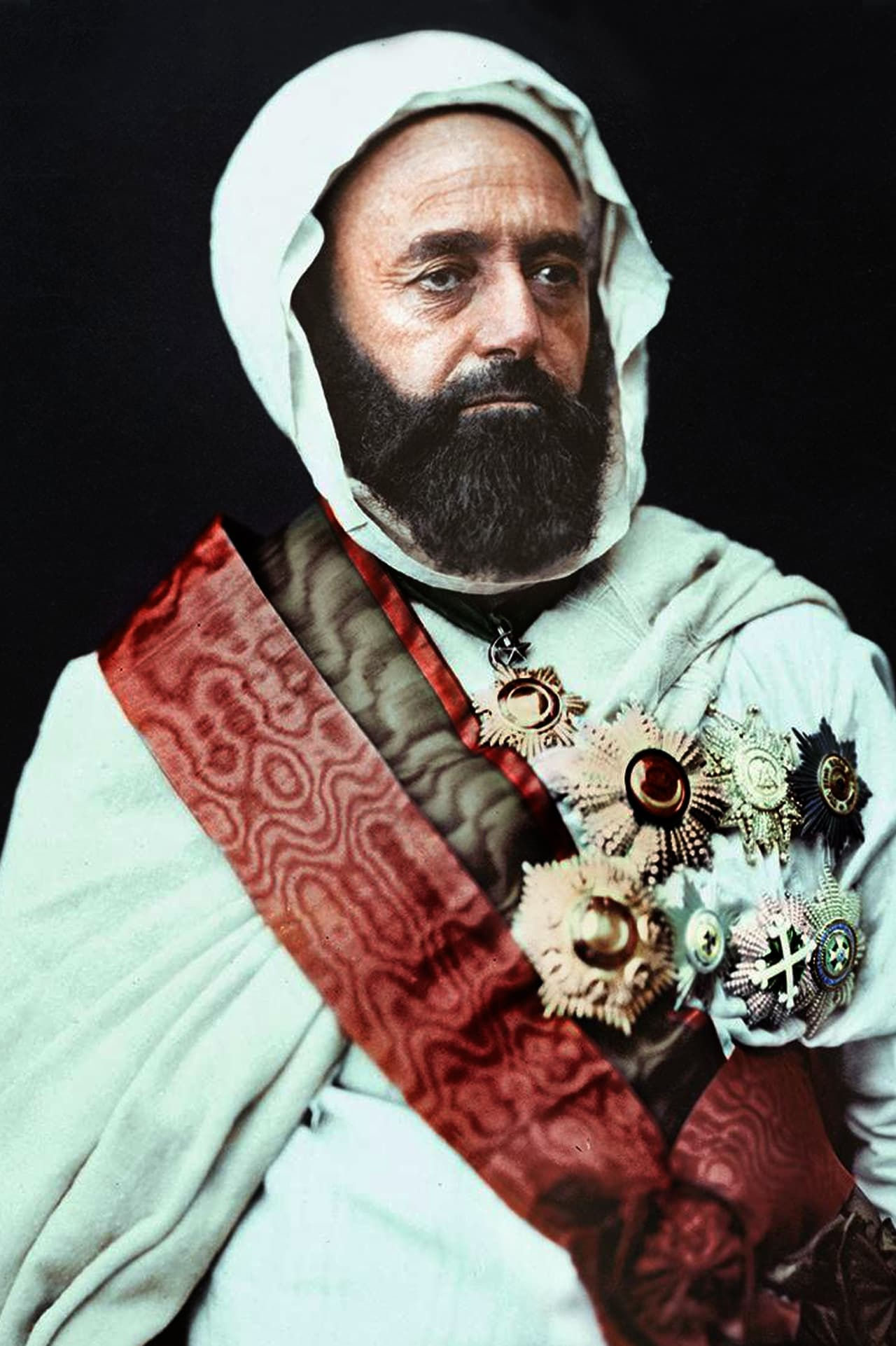
Emir Abdelkader, Algerian leader insurgent against French colonial rule, 1865

Although the French dismantled the Regency, an embryonic form of Algerian nationalism and state consciousness already existed. When the French invaded, local tribes rallied to support the Ottomans despite their resistance to the Regency. The French gradually expanded control, capturing Constantine in 1837. In western Algeria, Emir Abdelkader organized a state and led resistance against the French, notably at the 1835 Battle of Macta . After years of war, marked by ruthless French tactics including razzias, he surrendered in 1847. He remains Algeria's greatest national hero, and his struggle inspired Algerian nationalism. Resistance continued through revolts by the Kabyles, and other uprisings, all brutally suppressed, followed by massive land expropriation. The French committed genocide in Algeria. Historian Ben Kiernan wrote that the French killed approximately 825,000 Algerians from 1830 to 1875. From 1831 to 1851, French deaths were 95,665.

Colonial Algeria was had tensions between military rule and European settlers. While formally assimilated as French departments, it operated under a governor-general and institutions that strongly favoured settlers. By 1848, European population was more than 100,000, and reached 244,600 by 1872. The French Third Republic firmly established settler dominance, reinforced by figures like Eugène Étienne. A 1898 settler uprising led to greater autonomy for the colonial administration. The economy became heavily dependent on France, dominated by vineyards at the expense of food production, leaving the Muslim population discriminated against and impoverished. By the early 20th century, the colons formed a majority in both Algiers and Oran.

Algerian nationalism emerged before World War I through moderate, French-educated Jeunes Algériens, who demanded genuine assimilation and equal rights. During World War I, Algerians fought and worked in French factories, yet promised reforms like the 1919 Jonnart Law were largely undermined by settlers. This radicalized the movement. Emir Khaled (grandson of Abdelkader) called for broader democratic rights and was deported in 1923. Ferhat Abbas shifted from assimilationism after the rejection of the Blum-Viollette bill (1936). Messali Hadj consistently demanded full independence through the ENA and PPA, while Shaykh Ben Badis fostered cultural and Islamic nationalism via the AUMA (1931), promoting Arabic and Algerian identity.

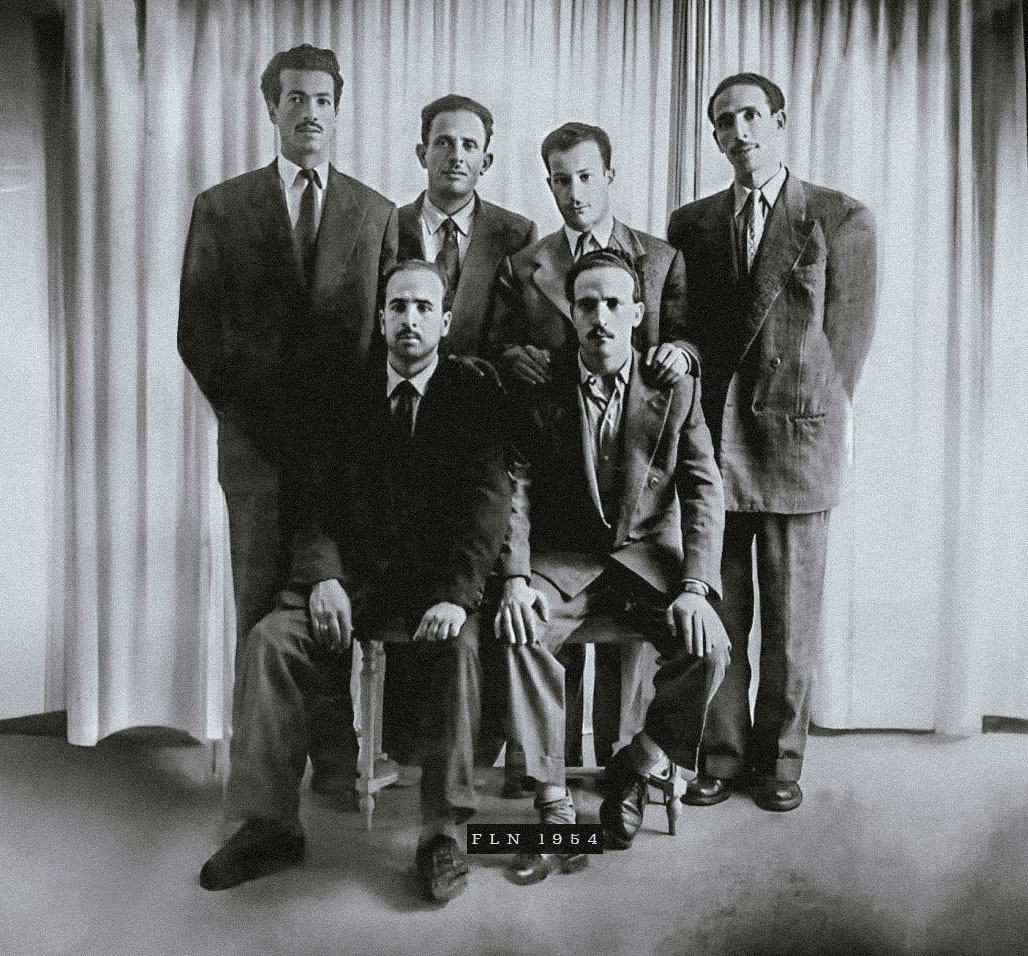
The six historical Leaders of the FLN: Rabah Bitat, Mostefa Ben Boulaïd, Mourad Didouche, Mohammed Boudiaf, Krim Belkacem and Larbi Ben M'Hidi.

During the Second World War, Algeria came under Vichy control before being liberated by the Allies in Operation Torch, which saw the first large-scale deployment of American troops in the North African campaign. In 1943, Abbas issued the Manifesto of the Algerian People demanding autonomy. Growing unity among nationalists through the AML movement, combined with French repression, led to the violent massacre at Sétif and Guelma in May 1945, where brutal colonial reprisals convinced many that armed struggle was the only solution. The flawed Organic Statute of 1947 further alienated the younger generation. A group of militants, including Ahmed Ben Bella, Hocine Ait Ahmed, Rabah Bitat, Larbi Ben M’hidi, and others — later known as the historic leaders — broke away and formed the CRUA in 1953, which became the Front de Libération Nationale (FLN) in 1954, preparing the country for the Algerian War of Independence.

The Algerian War was one of the most important Third World anti-colonial struggles. It succeeded due to the FLN's consistent pursuit of its core objectives (as outlined in the 1 November 1954 Proclamation and the 1956 Soummam Conference); attracting international attention to the struggle for "the restoration of the Algerian state." The FLN's military wing, known as the ALN, managed to pose a serious security threat to France while surviving deep internal rivalries.

Map illustrating the division of Algerian territory into 6 wilayas drawn up during the Soummam Congress in 1956 and the various parts of the French Challe Plan (offensive operations) during the Algerian War

The war began with coordinated FLN attacks on 31 October–1 November 1954. France responded with military force combined with social and economic measures under leaders like Mendès-France, Soustelle (who promoted "integration"), and later Guy Mollet. Violence escalated dramatically after the FLN's brutal attacks in the Nord Constantinois in August 1955. The FLN used hit and run attacks in Algeria and France as part of its war, and the French conducted severe reprisals. In addition, the French destroyed over 8,000 villages and relocated over 2 million Algerians to concentration camps. The Battle of Algiers (1956–57) saw the FLN resort to urban terrorism and bombings, which the French paratroopers crushed using torture — gaining military victory but suffering major political damage. The conflict was marked by fierce internal divisions: FLN vs. Messali Hadj's MNA (resulting in bloody fratricidal massacres like Mélouza), and tensions between "internal" and "external" FLN forces. The French army, drawing lessons from Indochina, achieved significant military successes, notably with the Morice Line and General Challe's campaigns, but faced growing political frustration.

After Charles de Gaulle's return to power in 1958, the FLN created the Provisional Government of the Algerian Republic (GPRA) and appointed Ferhat Abbas as its president. The GPRA rejected de Gaulle's ceasefire proposal termed "Peace of the Brave", causing him to shift his position toward self-determination (announced in 1959). This triggered settler and military revolts, including the failed putsch of April 1961 by generals led by Challe and Salan, who later joined the terrorist OAS. After difficult negotiations, the Évian Accords were signed in March 1962, leading to a ceasefire and a referendum in which Algerians overwhelmingly voted for independence. Algeria became independent on 5 July 1962, ending 132 years of French colonial rule.

The human cost was immense. Historians, like Alistair Horne and Raymond Aron, state that the actual number of Algerian Muslim war dead was far greater than the original FLN and official French estimates but was less than the 1 million deaths claimed by the Algerian government after independence. Horne estimated Algerian casualties during the span of eight years to be around 700,000. The war uprooted more than 2 million Algerians.

The number of European Pied-Noirs who fled Algeria totalled more than 900,000 between 1962 and 1964. The exodus to mainland France accelerated after the Oran massacre of 1962, in which many Europeans were murdered as reprisal for OAS terror attacks. It is estimated that between 30,000 and 150,000 Harkis and their dependents were killed by the FLN or by lynch mobs in Algeria. The country was left devastated: massive displacement, economic collapse due to the sudden departure of most European settlers, and deep social trauma.

=== Post-Independence ===
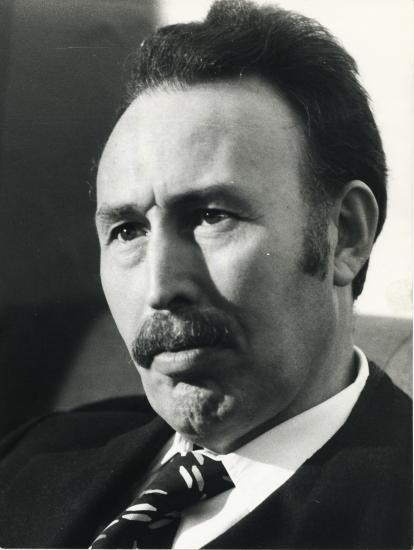
Houari Boumediene

The FLN's fragile unity broke down immediately after independence, leading to power struggles between the GPRA's president Ben Youcef Ben Khedda, other GPRA members including Ait Ahmed, Rabah Bitat and Ahmed Ben Bella. The latter was supported by the external ALN under Houari Boumedienne who marched on Algiers. After mass demonstrations organised by the UGTA, civil war was avoided and Ben Bella took power in September 1962. The new nation faced enormous challenges in rebuilding a dislocated economy and forging a coherent national identity.

Algeria's first president was the Front de Libération Nationale (FLN) leader Ahmed Ben Bella. A territorial dispute arising from Morocco's claims to portions of western Algeria led to the Sand War in 1963. Ben Bella was overthrown in 1965 by Houari Boumédiène, his former ally and defence minister. Under Ben Bella, the government had become increasingly socialist and authoritarian; Boumédienne continued this trend. However, he relied much more on the army for his support, and reduced the sole legal party to a symbolic role. He collectivised agriculture and launched a massive industrialisation drive. Oil extraction facilities were nationalised. This was especially beneficial to the leadership after the international 1973 oil crisis.

Boumédienne's successor, Chadli Bendjedid, introduced some liberal economic reforms. He promoted a policy of Arabisation in Algerian society and public life. Teachers of Arabic, brought in from other Muslim countries, spread conventional Islamic thought in schools and sowed the seeds of a return to Orthodox Islam.

The Algerian economy became increasingly dependent on oil, leading to hardship when the price collapsed during the 1980s oil glut. Economic recession caused by the crash in world oil prices resulted in Algerian social unrest during the 1980s; by the end of the decade, Bendjedid introduced a multi-party system. Political parties developed, such as the Islamic Salvation Front (FIS), a broad coalition of Muslim groups.

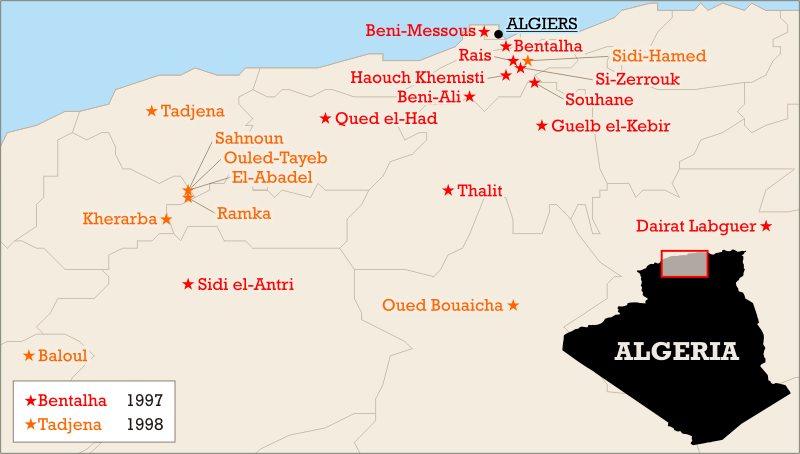
Massacres of over 50 people in 1997–1998. The Armed Islamic Group (GIA) claimed responsibility for many of them.

In December 1991 the Islamic Salvation Front dominated the first of two rounds of legislative elections. Fearing the election of an Islamist government, the authorities intervened on 11 January 1992, cancelling the elections. Bendjedid resigned and a High Council of State was installed to act as the Presidency. It banned the FIS, triggering a civil insurgency between the Front's armed wing, the Armed Islamic Group, and the national armed forces, in which more than 100,000 people are thought to have died. The Islamist militants conducted a violent campaign of civilian massacres. At several points in the conflict, the situation in Algeria became a point of international concern, most notably during the crisis surrounding Air France Flight 8969, a hijacking perpetrated by the Armed Islamic Group. The Armed Islamic Group declared a ceasefire in October 1997.

Algeria held elections in 1999, considered biased by international observers and most opposition groups which were won by President Abdelaziz Bouteflika. He worked to restore political stability to the country and announced a "Civil Concord" initiative, approved in a referendum, under which many political prisoners were pardoned, and several thousand members of armed groups were granted exemption from prosecution under a limited amnesty, in force until 13 January 2000. The AIS disbanded and levels of insurgent violence fell rapidly. The Groupe Salafiste pour la Prédication et le Combat (GSPC), a splinter group of the Armed Islamic Group, continued a terrorist campaign against the Government.

Bouteflika was re-elected in the April 2004 presidential election after campaigning on a programme of national reconciliation. The programme comprised economic, institutional, political and social reform to modernise the country, raise living standards, and tackle the causes of alienation. It also included a second amnesty initiative, the Charter for Peace and National Reconciliation, which was approved in a referendum in September 2005. It offered amnesty to most guerrillas and Government security forces.

In November 2008, the Algerian Constitution was amended following a vote in Parliament, removing the two-term limit on Presidential incumbents. This change enabled Bouteflika to stand for re-election in the 2009 presidential elections, and he was re-elected in April 2009. During his election campaign and following his re-election, Bouteflika promised to extend the programme of national reconciliation and a $150-billion spending programme to create three million new jobs, the construction of one million new housing units, and to continue public sector and infrastructure modernisation programmes.

A continuing series of protests throughout the country started on 28 December 2010, inspired by similar protests across the Middle East and North Africa. On 24 February 2011, the government lifted Algeria's 19-year-old state of emergency. The government enacted legislation dealing with political parties, the electoral code, and the representation of women in elected bodies. In April 2011, Bouteflika promised further constitutional and political reform. However, elections are routinely criticised by opposition groups as unfair and international human rights groups say that media censorship and harassment of political opponents continue.

On 2 April 2019, Bouteflika resigned from the presidency after mass protests against his candidacy for a fifth term in office.

In December 2019, Abdelmadjid Tebboune became Algeria's president, after winning the first round of the presidential election with a record abstention rate – the highest of all presidential elections since Algeria's democracy in 1989. Tebboune is accused of being close to the military and being loyal to the deposed president. Tebboune rejects these accusations, claiming to be the victim of a witch hunt. He also reminds his detractors that he was expelled from the Government in August 2017 at the instigation of oligarchs languishing in prison. In September 2024, President Tebboune won a second term with a landslide 84.3 percent of the vote, although his opponents called the results fraud.

== Geography ==
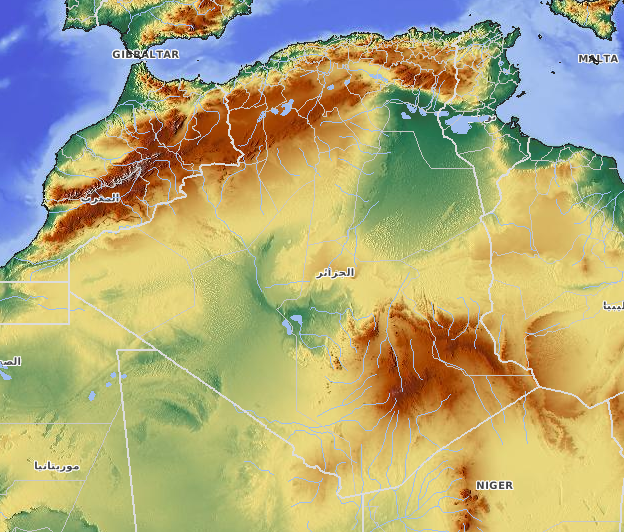
The Sahara, the Hoggar Mountains and the Atlas Mountains compose the Algerian relief.

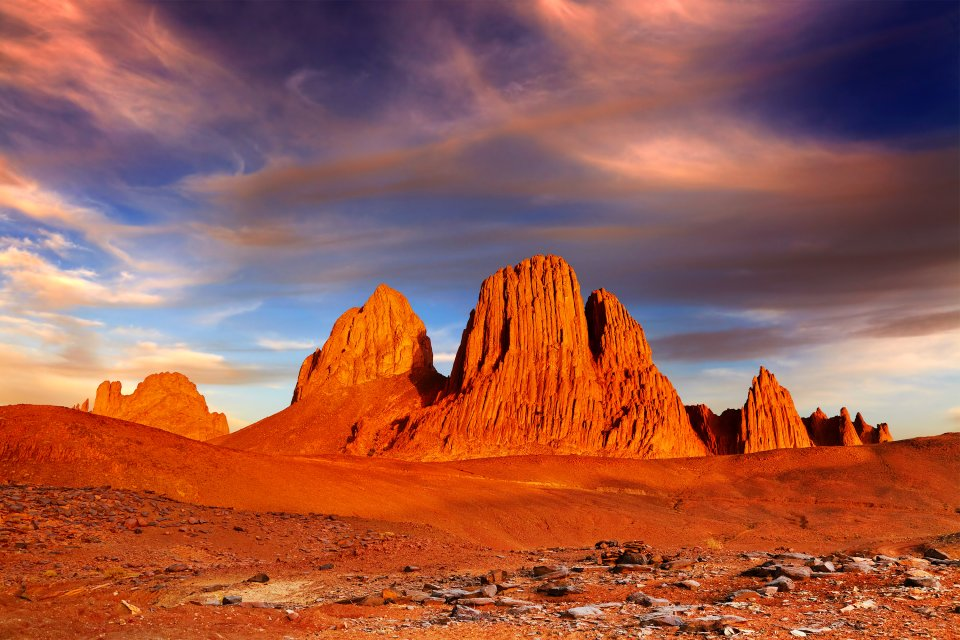
The Algerian Desert makes up more than 90% of the country's total area.

Algeria is the largest country in Africa and the Mediterranean basin. Its southern part includes a significant portion of the Sahara. To the north, the Tell Atlas forms with the Saharan Atlas, further south, two parallel sets of reliefs in approaching eastbound, and between which are inserted vast plains and highlands. Both Atlas tend to merge in eastern Algeria. The vast mountain ranges of Aures and Nememcha occupy the entire northeastern Algeria and are delineated by the Tunisian border. The highest point is Mount Tahat (3,003 metres or 9,852 feet).

Algeria lies mostly between latitudes 19° and 37°N (a small area is north of 37°N and south of 19°N), and longitudes 9°W and 12°E. Most of the coastal area is hilly, sometimes even mountainous, and there are a few natural harbours. The area from the coast to the Tell Atlas is fertile. South of the Tell Atlas is a steppe landscape ending with the Saharan Atlas; farther south, there is the Sahara desert.

The Hoggar Mountains (Arabic: جبال هقار), also known as the Hoggar, are a highland region in central Sahara, southern Algeria. They are located about 1,500 km (932 mi) south of the capital, Algiers, and just east of Tamanghasset. Algiers, Oran, Constantine, and Annaba are Algeria's main cities.

=== Climate and hydrology ===
Algeria map of Köppen climate classification

In this region, midday desert temperatures can be hot year round. After sunset, however, the clear, dry air permits rapid loss of heat, and the nights are cool to chilly. Enormous daily ranges in temperature are recorded.

Rainfall is fairly plentiful along the coastal part of the Tell Atlas, ranging from 400 to 670 mm (15.7 to 26.4 in) annually, the amount of precipitation increasing from west to east. Precipitation is heaviest in the northern part of eastern Algeria, where it reaches as much as 1,000 mm (39.4 in) in some years.

Farther inland, the rainfall is less plentiful. Algeria also has ergs, or sand dunes, between mountains. Among these, in the summer time when winds are heavy and gusty, temperatures can go up to 43.3 °C (110 °F).

Climate change in Algeria has wide-reaching effects on the country. Algeria was not a significant contributor to climate change, but, like other countries in the Middle East and North Africa (MENA) region, is expected to be among the most affected by climate change impacts. Because a large part of the country is in already hot and arid geographies, including part of the Sahara, already strong heat and water resource access challenges are expected to get worse. As early as 2014, scientists were attributing extreme heat waves to climate change in Algeria. Algeria was ranked 46th of countries in the 2020 Climate Change Performance Index.

=== Fauna and flora ===
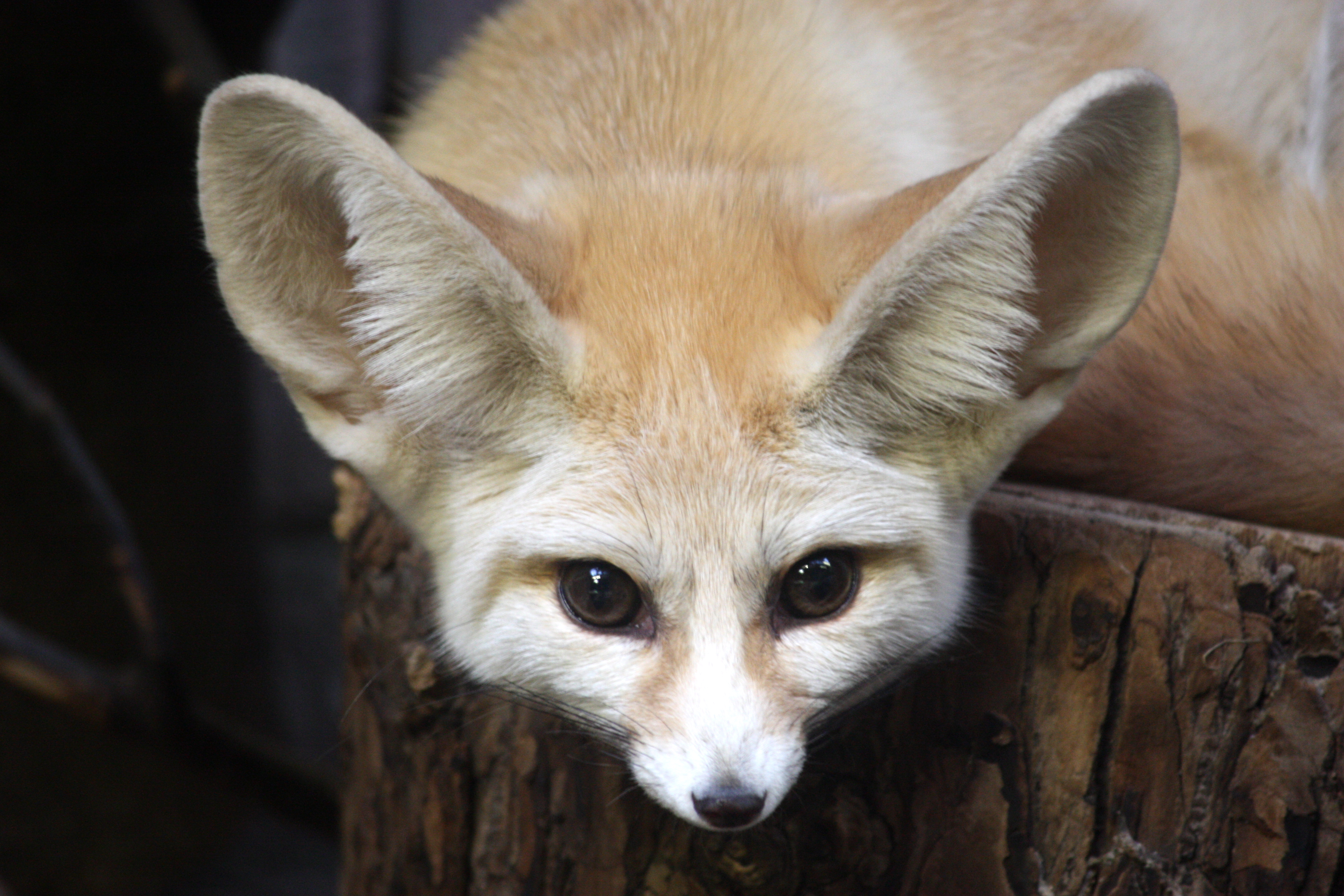
The fennec fox is the national animal of Algeria.

The varied vegetation of Algeria includes coastal, mountainous and grassy desert-like regions which all support a wide range of wildlife.

In Algeria forest cover is around 1% of the total land area, equivalent to 1,949,000 hectares (ha) of forest in 2020, up from 1,667,000 hectares (ha) in 1990. In 2020, naturally regenerating forest covered 1,439,000 hectares (ha) and planted forest covered 510,000 hectares (ha). Of the naturally regenerating forest 0% was reported to be primary forest (consisting of native tree species with no clearly visible indications of human activity) and around 6% of the forest area was found within protected areas. For the year 2015, 80% of the forest area was reported to be under public ownership, 18% private ownership and 2% with ownership listed as other or unknown.

Many of the creatures constituting the Algerian wildlife live close to civilisation. The most commonly seen animals include the wild boars, African wolves, and gazelles, although it is not uncommon to spot fennec foxes and jerboas. Algeria also has a small African leopard and Northwest African cheetah population, but these are seldom seen. A subspecies of red deer, the Barbary stag, inhabits the dense humid forests in the north-eastern areas. The fennec fox is the national animal of Algeria.

A variety of bird species makes the country an attraction for bird watchers. The forests are inhabited by boars and wolves. Barbary macaques are the sole native monkey. Snakes, desert monitors, and numerous other reptiles can be found living among an array of rodents throughout the semi arid regions of Algeria. Many animals are now extinct, including the Barbary lions, Atlas bears and West African crocodiles.

In the north, some of the native flora includes Macchia scrub, olive trees, oaks, cedars and other conifers. The mountain regions contain large forests of evergreens (Aleppo pine, juniper, and evergreen oak) and some deciduous trees. Fig, eucalyptus, agave, and various palm trees grow in the warmer areas. The grape vine is indigenous to the coast. In the Sahara region, some oases have palm trees. Acacias with wild olives are the predominant flora in the remainder of the Sahara. Algeria had a 2018 Forest Landscape Integrity Index mean score of 5.22/10, ranking it 106th globally out of 172 countries.

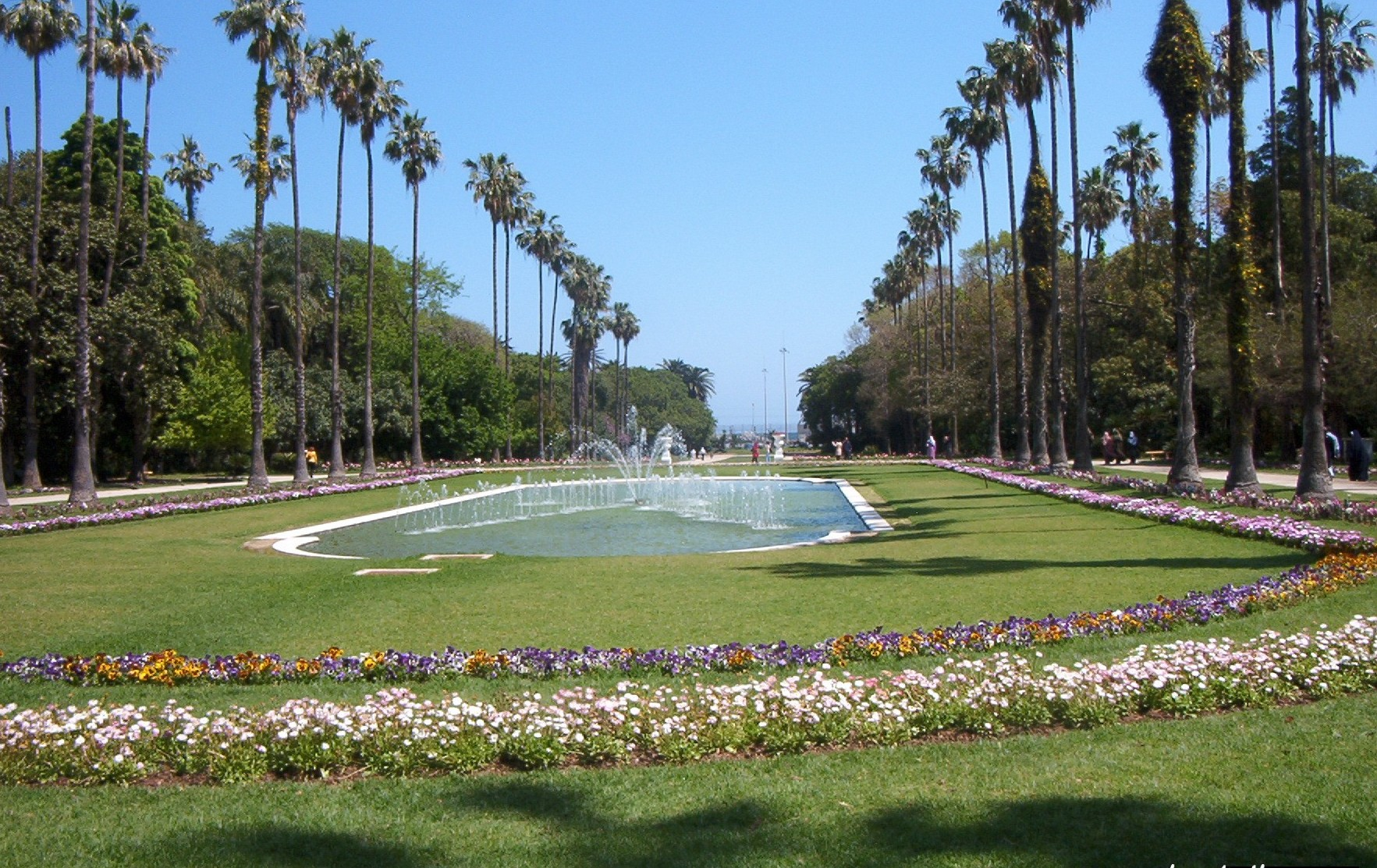
The Botanical Garden Hamma is home to an estimated 1,200 distinct plant species, including numerous rare and exotic varieties.

== Government and politics ==
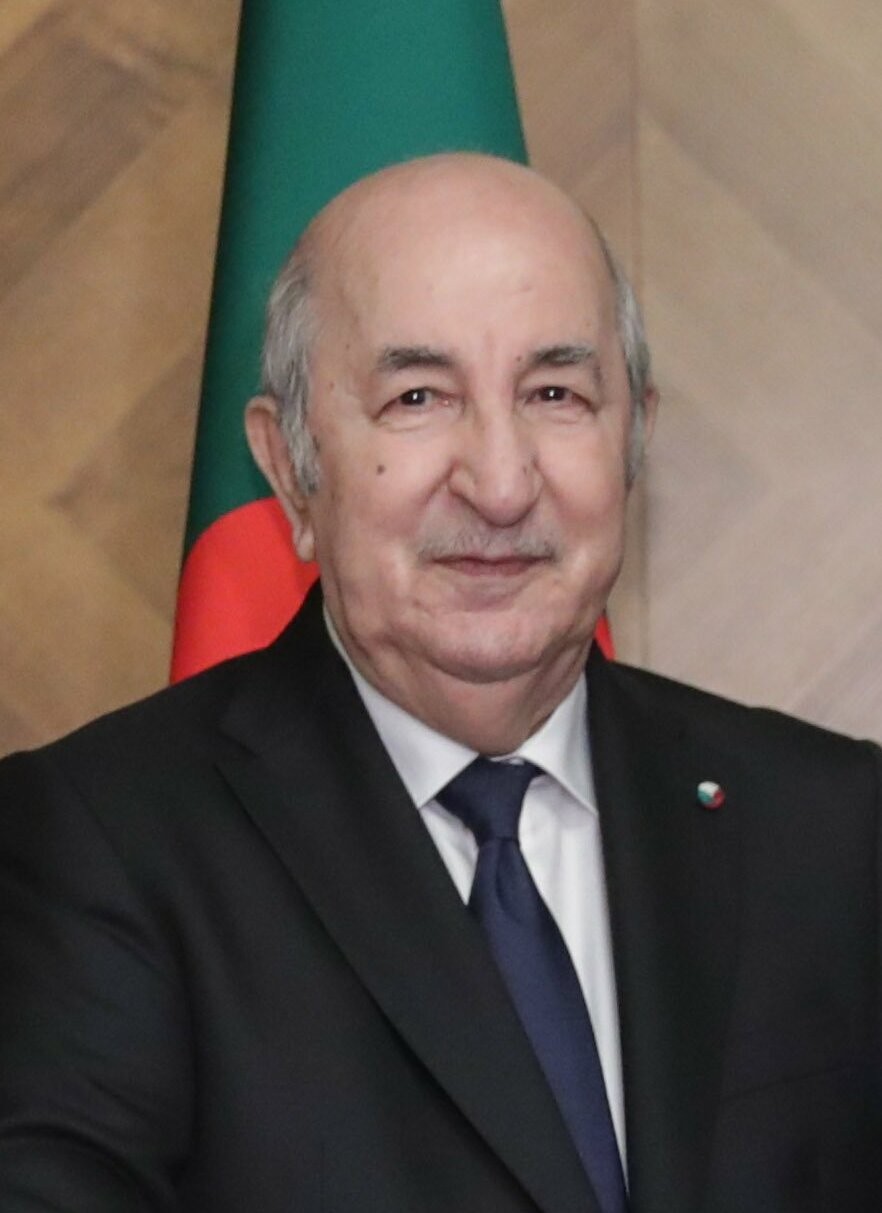
Abdelmadjid Tebboune, President of Algeria since 2019

Algeria's government has been described as authoritarian, and elected politicians have relatively little sway over affairs in the country. Instead, a group of unelected civilian and military "décideurs" ("deciders") known as "le pouvoir" ("the power") exercise de facto rule over the country, even deciding who should be president. The most powerful man might have been Mohamed Mediène, the head of military intelligence, before he was brought down during the 2019 protests. In recent years, many of these generals have died, retired, or been imprisoned. After the death of General Larbi Belkheir, previous president Bouteflika put loyalists in key posts, notably at Sonatrach, and secured constitutional amendments that made him re-electable indefinitely, until he was brought down in 2019 during protests.

The head of state is the President of Algeria, who is elected for a five-year term. The president is limited to two five-year terms. The 2019 presidential election had been planned to be in April 2019, but widespread protests had erupted on 22 February against the president's decision to participate in the election, which had resulted in President Bouteflika announcing his resignation on 2 April. Abdelmadjid Tebboune, an independent candidate, was elected as president after the election eventually took place on 12 December 2019. Protestors refused to recognise Tebboune as president, citing demands for comprehensive reform of the political system. Algeria has universal suffrage at 18 years of age. The President is the head of the army, the Council of Ministers and the High Security Council. He appoints the Prime Minister who is also the head of government.

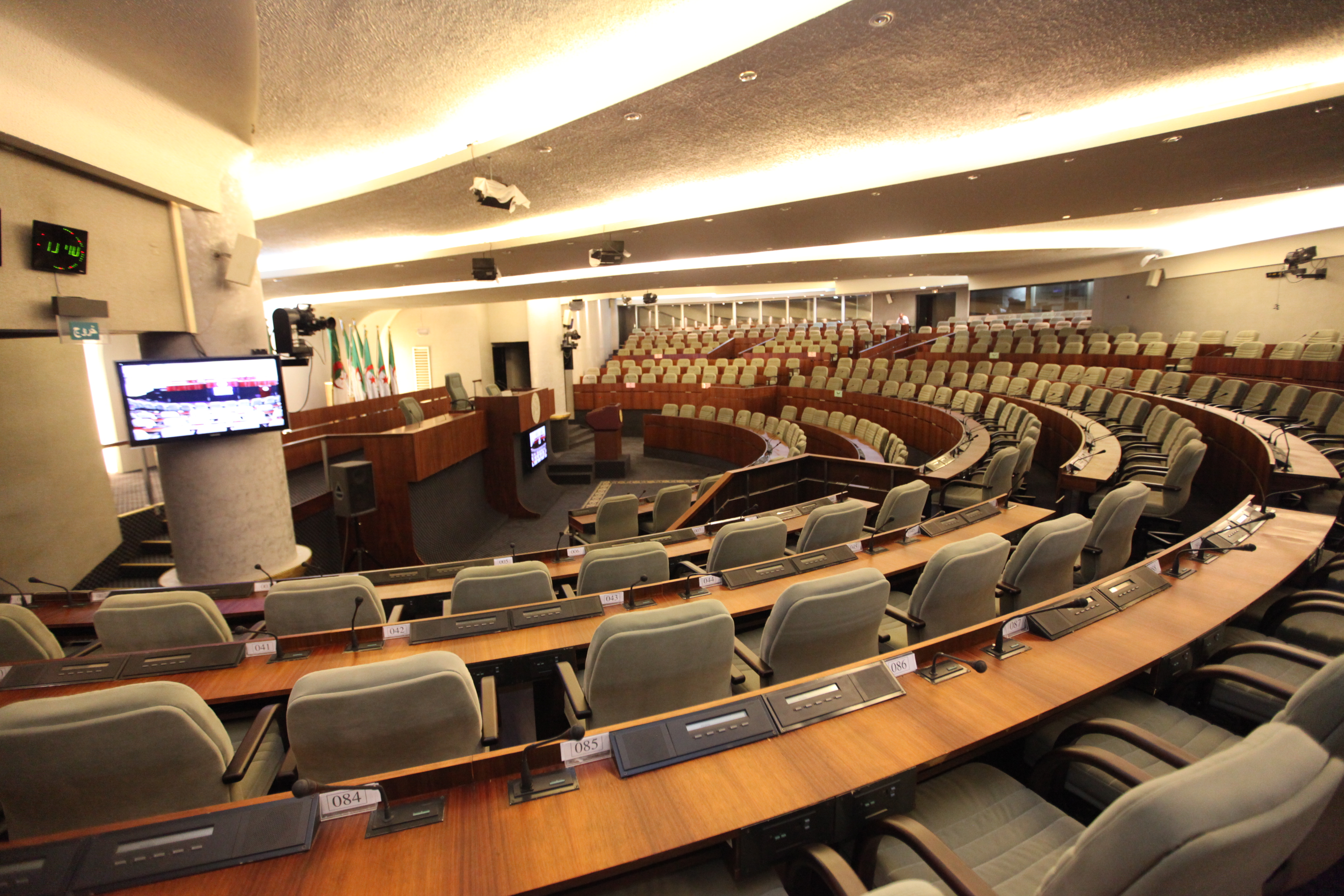
The People's National Assembly

The Algerian parliament is bicameral; the lower house, the People's National Assembly, has 462 members who are directly elected for five-year terms, while the upper house, the Council of the Nation, has 144 members serving six-year terms, of which 96 members are chosen by local assemblies and 48 are appointed by the president. According to the constitution, no political association may be formed if it is "based on differences in religion, language, race, gender, profession, or region". In addition, political campaigns must be exempt from the aforementioned subjects.

Parliamentary elections were last held in June 2021. In the elections, the FLN lost 66 of its seats, but remained the largest party with 98 seats. Other parties included the Movement of the Society for Peace which won 65 seats, the National Rally for Democracy which won 58 seats, the Future Front which won 48 seats, and the National Construction Movement which won 39 seats.

=== Administrative divisions ===
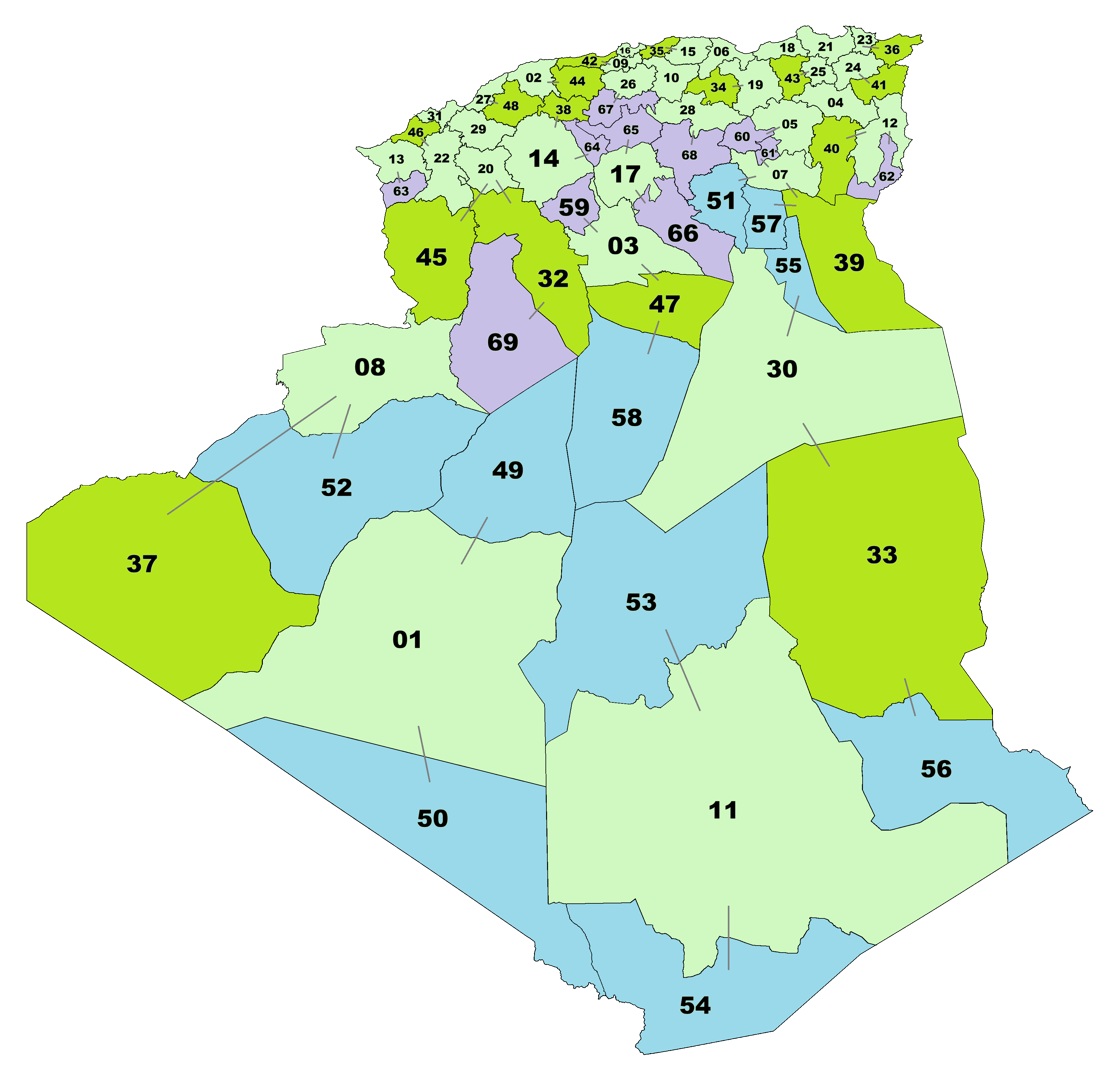
A map of Algerian provinces

Algeria is divided into 69 provinces (wilayas), 553 districts (daïras) and 1,541 municipalities (baladiyahs). Each province, district, and municipality is named after its seat, which is usually the largest city.

Provinces of [Algeria
No.	Wilaya	Area (km^{2})	Population
1	Adrar	402,197	439,700
2	Chlef	4,975	1,013,718
3	Laghouat	25,057	477,328
4	Oum El Bouaghi	6,768	644,364
5	Batna	12,192	1,128,030
6	Béjaïa	3,268	915,835
7	Biskra	20,986	730,262
8	Béchar	161,400	274,866
9	Blida	1,696	1,009,892
10	Bouïra	4,439	694,750
11	Tamanrasset	556,200	198,691
12	Tébessa	14,227	657,227
13	Tlemcen	9,061	945,525
14	Tiaret	20,673	842,060
15	Tizi Ouzou	3,568	1,119,646
16	Algiers	273	2,947,461
17	Djelfa	66,415	1,223,223
18	Jijel	2,577	634,412
19	Sétif	6,504	1,496,150
20	Saïda	6,764	328,685
21	Skikda	4,026	904,195
22	Sidi Bel Abbès	9,150	603,369
23	Annaba	1,439	640,050
24	Guelma	4,101	482,261
25	Constantine	2,187	943,112
26	Médéa	8,866	830,943
27	Mostaganem	2,269	746,947
28	M'Sila	18,718	991,846
29	Mascara	5,941	780,959
30	Ouargla	211,980	552,539
31	Oran	2,114	1,584,607
32	El Bayadh	78,870	262,187
33	Illizi	285,000	54,490
34	Bordj Bou Arréridj	4,115	634,396
35	Boumerdes	1,591	795,019
36	El Taref	3,339	411,783
37	Tindouf	58,193	159,000
38	Tissemsilt	3,152	296,366
39	El Oued	54,573	673,934
40	Khenchela	9,811	384,268
41	Souk Ahras	4,541	440,299
42	Tipaza	2,166	617,661
43	Mila	9,375	768,419
44	Ain Defla	4,897	771,890
45	Naâma	29,950	209,470
46	Ain Timouchent	2,376	384,565
47	Ghardaia	86,105	375,988
48	Relizane	4,870	733,060
49	Timimoun	8,835	162,267
50	Bordj Baji Mokhtar	62,215	57,276
51	Ouled Djellal	11,410	174,219
52	Béni Abbès	120,026	16,437
53	In Salah	101,350	50,163
54	In Guezzam	65,203	122,019
55	Touggourt	17,428	247,221
56	Djanet	86,185	17,618
57	El M'Ghair	131,220	50,392
58	El Menia	88,126	11,202
59	Aflou		
60	Barika		
61	El Kantara		
62	Bir El Ater		
63	El Aricha		
64	Ksar Chellala		
65	Aïn Oussera		
66	Messaad		
67	Ksar El Boukhari		
68	Bousaâda		
69	El Abiodh Sidi Cheikh		

=== Foreign relations ===
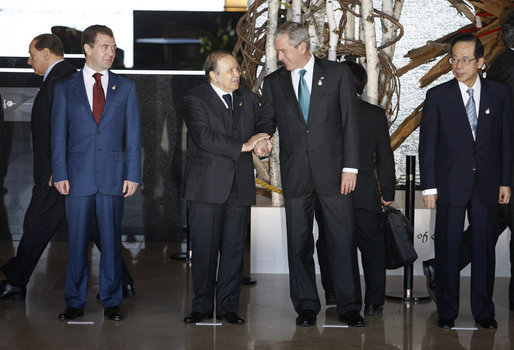
President Abdelaziz Bouteflika and George W. Bush exchange handshakes at the Windsor Hotel Toya Resort and Spa in Tōyako Town, Abuta District, Hokkaidō in 2008. With them are Dmitriy Medvedev, left, and Yasuo Fukuda, right.

Algeria is included in the European Union's European Neighbourhood Policy (ENP) which aims at bringing the EU and its neighbours closer. Giving incentives and rewarding best performers, as well as offering funds in a faster and more flexible manner, are the two main principles underlying the European Neighbourhood Instrument (ENI) that came into force in 2014. It has a budget of €15.4 billion and provides the bulk of funding through a number of programmes.

In 2009, the French government agreed to compensate victims of nuclear tests in Algeria. Defence Minister Hervé Morin stated that "It's time for our country to be at peace with itself, at peace thanks to a system of compensation and reparations", when presenting the draft law on the payouts. Algerian officials and activists believe that this is a good first step and hope that this move would encourage broader reparation.

Tensions between Algeria and Morocco in relation to the Western Sahara have been an obstacle to tightening the Arab Maghreb Union, nominally established in 1989, but which has carried little practical weight. On 24 August 2021, Algeria announced the break of diplomatic relations with Morocco.

=== Military ===
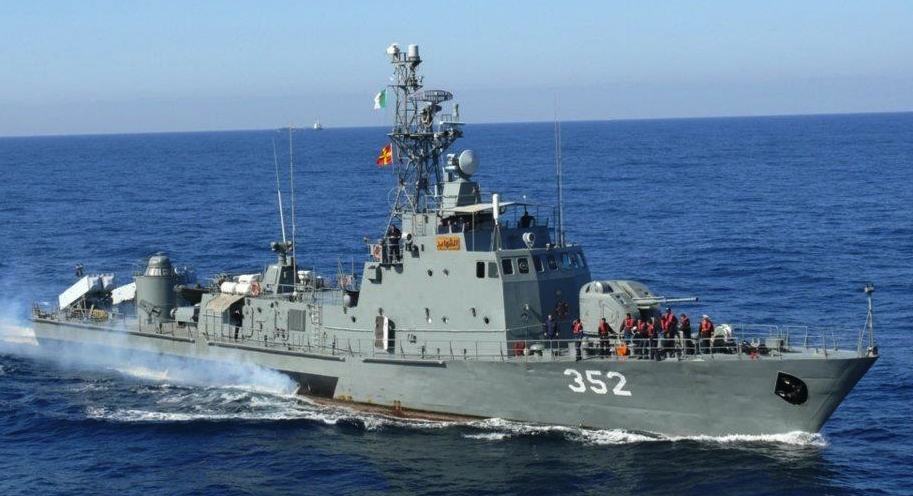
A Djebel Chenoua-class corvette, designed and built in Algeria

The military of Algeria consists of the People's National Army (ANP), the Algerian National Navy (MRA), and the Algerian Air Force (QJJ), plus the Territorial Air Defence Forces. It is the direct successor of the National Liberation Army (Armée de Libération Nationale or ALN), the armed wing of the nationalist National Liberation Front which fought French colonial occupation during the Algerian War of Independence (1954–62).

Total military personnel include 147,000 active, 150,000 reserve, and 187,000 paramilitary staff (2008 estimate). Service in the military is compulsory for men aged 19–30, for a total of 12 months.

As of 2026, Global Firepower ranks Algeria 27th among 145 countries in its annual conventional military-strength index, with a PowerIndex score of 0.4849. The same assessment ranks Algeria second among African states, behind Egypt. The International Institute for Strategic Studies (IISS) describes The Military Balance as an assessment of military forces, personnel, equipment inventories and defence economics covering more than 170 countries. Algeria has the second-largest military in North Africa with the largest defence budget in Africa ($10 billion). According to the Stockholm International Peace Research Institute (SIPRI), Algeria spent approximately US$25.4 billion on its military in 2025, placing it 20th globally among the countries with the highest military expenditure.

After Algerian state media confirmed the acquisition of the Sukhoi Su-57, this makes Algeria the first operator of fighters of the new 5th generation in Africa, the Arab world, or among Muslim-majority countries. to acquire the Russian fifth-generation fighter. Algeria's other principal modern weapons include the T-90 main battle tank, Su-30MKA multirole fighter, Su-35 fighter, Su-57 fifth-generation fighter, MiG-29 fighter, Mi-28 attack helicopter, S-400 missile system and Kilo-class submarine. The country's modernization programme has relied heavily on Russian equipment as most of Algeria's weapons are imported from Russia, while China and European suppliers have also become significant sources of military technology.

=== Human rights ===
Algeria has been categorised by the US government funded Freedom House as "not free" since it began publishing such ratings in 1972, with the exception of 1989, 1990, and 1991, when the country was labelled "partly free". In December 2016, the Euro-Mediterranean Human Rights Monitor issued a report regarding violation of media freedom in Algeria. It clarified that the Algerian government imposed restrictions on freedom of the press; expression; and right to peaceful demonstration, protest and assembly as well as intensified censorship of the media and websites. Due to the fact that the journalists and activists criticise the ruling government, some media organisations' licenses are cancelled.

Independent and autonomous trade unions face routine harassment from the government, with many leaders imprisoned and protests suppressed. In 2016, a number of unions, many of which were involved in the 2010–2012 Algerian Protests, have been deregistered by the government.

Homosexuality is illegal in Algeria. Public homosexual behaviour is punishable by up to two years in prison. Despite this, about 26% of Algerians think that homosexuality should be accepted, according to the survey conducted by the BBC News Arabic-Arab Barometer in 2019. Algeria showed the highest LGBT acceptance compared to other Arab countries where the survey was conducted.

== Economy ==
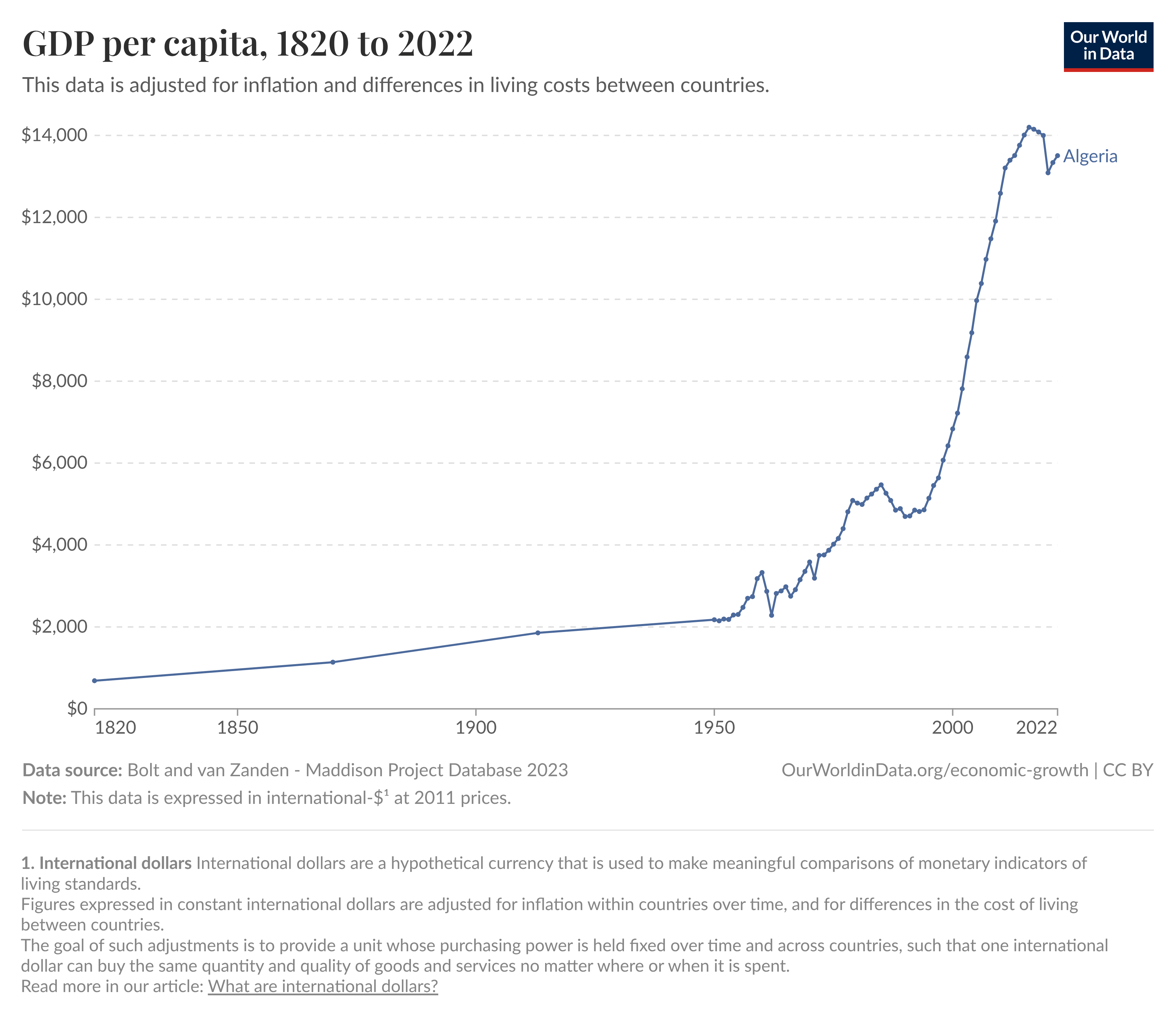
GDP per capita development in Algeria

Algeria's currency is the dinar (DZD). The economy remains dominated by the state, a legacy of the country's socialist post-independence development model. In June 2024 The World Bank's 2024 report marks a turning point for Algeria, which joins the select club of upper-middle-income countries. This economic rise, the result of an ambitious development strategy, places the country in the same category as emerging powers such as China, Brazil and Turkey In recent years, the Algerian government has halted the privatisation of state-owned industries and imposed restrictions on imports and foreign involvement in its economy. These restrictions are just starting to be lifted off recently although questions about Algeria's slowly-diversifying economy remain.

Algeria has struggled to develop industries outside hydrocarbons in part because of high costs and an inert state bureaucracy. The government's efforts to diversify the economy by attracting foreign and domestic investment outside the energy sector have done little to reduce high youth unemployment rates or to address housing shortages. The country is facing a number of short-term and medium-term problems, including the need to diversify the economy, strengthen political, economic and financial reforms, improve the business climate and reduce inequalities among regions.

The overall rate of unemployment was 11.8% in 2023. The government strengthened in 2011 the job programmes introduced in 1988, in particular in the framework of the programme to aid those seeking work (Dispositif d'Aide à l'Insertion Professionnelle). Youth unemployment was 29.4% in 2025.

A wave of economic protests in February and March 2011 prompted the Algerian government to offer more than $23 billion in public grants and retroactive salary and benefit increases. Public spending has increased by 27% annually during the past five years. The 2010–14 public-investment programme will cost US$286 billion, 40% of which will go to human development.

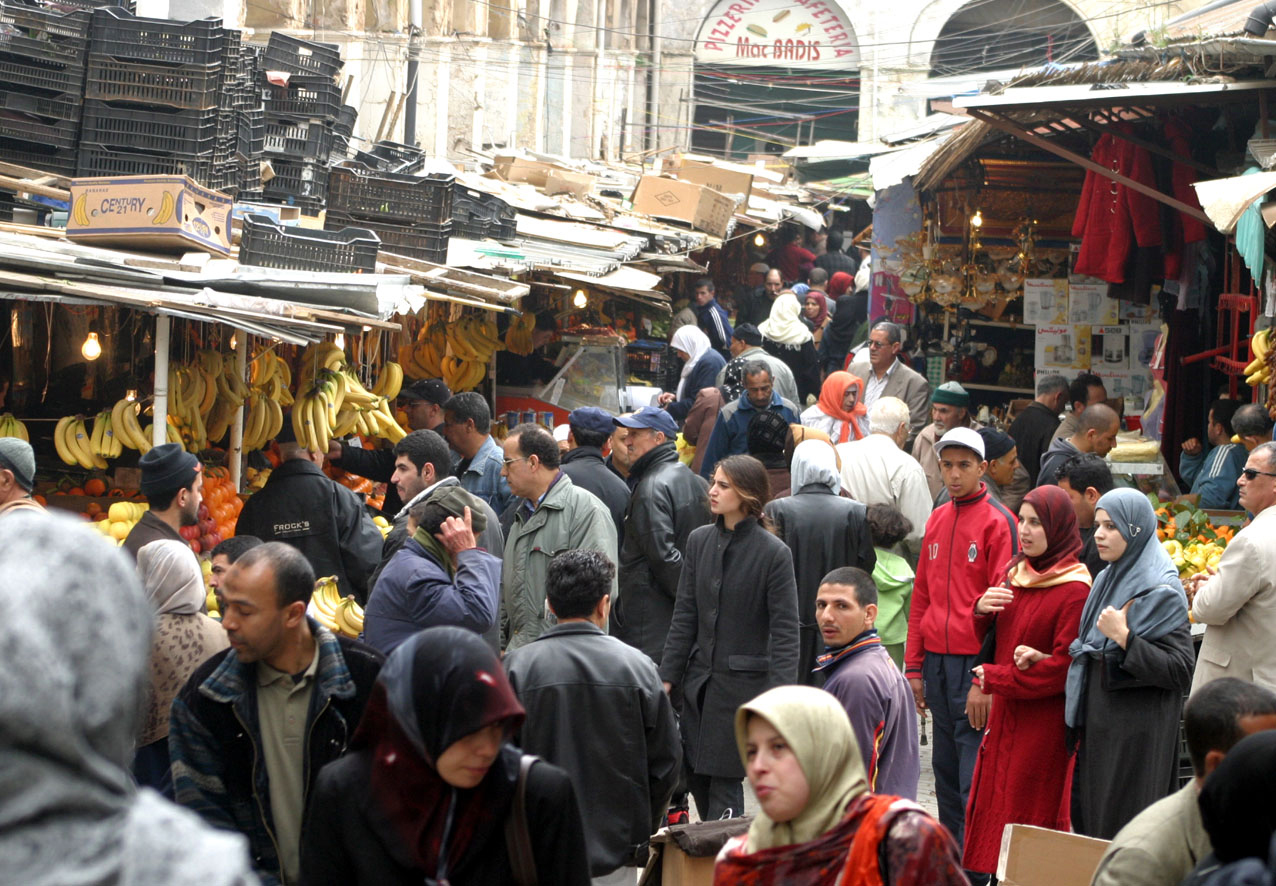
Street market in Algeria

Thanks to strong hydrocarbon revenues, Algeria has a cushion of $173 billion in foreign currency reserves and a large hydrocarbon stabilization fund. In addition, Algeria's external debt is low at about 2% of GDP. The economy remains very dependent on hydrocarbon wealth, and, despite high foreign exchange reserves (US$178 billion, equivalent to three years of imports), current expenditure growth makes Algeria's budget more vulnerable to the risk of prolonged lower hydrocarbon revenues.

Algeria has not joined the WTO, despite several years of negotiations but is a member of the Greater Arab Free Trade Area, the African Continental Free Trade Area, and has an association agreement with the European Union.

Turkish direct investments have accelerated in Algeria, with total value reaching $5 billion. As of 2022, the number of Turkish companies present in Algeria has reached 1,400. In 2020, despite the pandemic, more than 130 Turkish companies were created in Algeria.

=== Natural resources ===
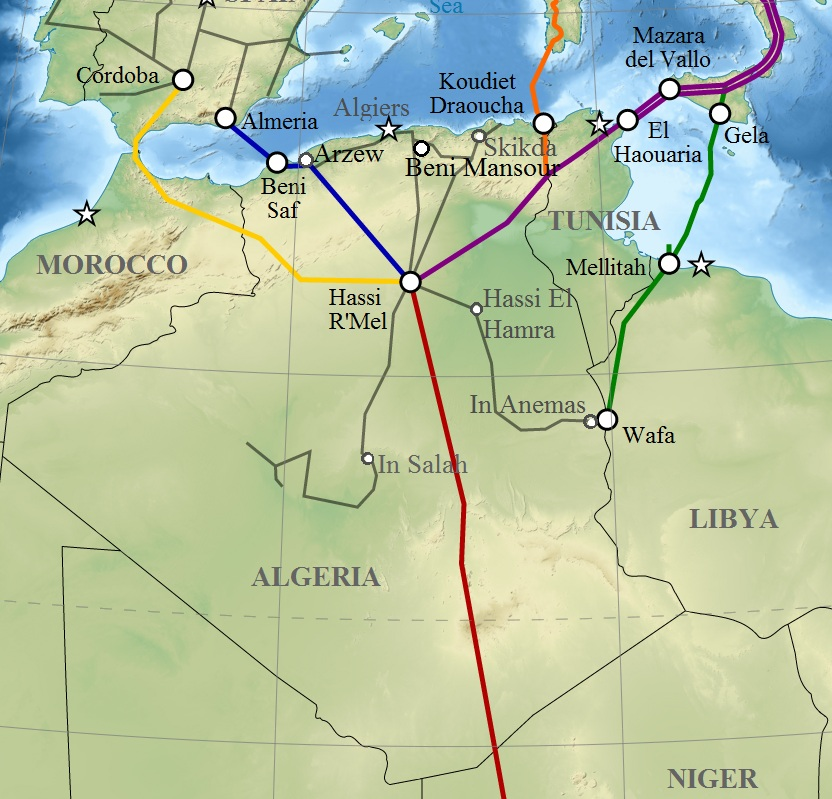
Pipelines across Algeria

Algeria, whose economy is reliant on petroleum, has been a member of the OPEC cartel since 1969. Its crude oil production stands at around 1.1 million barrels/day, but it is also a major gas producer and exporter, with important links to Europe. Hydrocarbons have long been the backbone of the economy, accounting for roughly 60% of budget revenues, 30% of GDP, and 87.7% of export earnings. Algeria has the 10th-largest reserves of natural gas in the world and is the sixth-largest gas exporter. The U.S. Energy Information Administration reported that in 2005, Algeria had 4.5 trillion cubic metres (160×10^{12} cu ft) of proven natural gas reserves. It also ranks 16th in oil reserves.

Non-hydrocarbon growth for 2011 was projected at 5%. To cope with social demands, the authorities raised expenditure, especially on basic food support, employment creation, support for SMEs, and higher salaries. High hydrocarbon prices have improved the current account and the already large international reserves position.

Income from oil and gas rose in 2011 as a result of continuing high oil prices, though the trend in production volume is downward. Production from the oil and gas sector in terms of volume continues to decline, dropping from 43.2 million tonnes to 32 million tonnes between 2007 and 2011. Nevertheless, the sector accounted for 98% of the total volume of exports in 2011, against 48% in 1962, and 70% of budgetary receipts, or US$71.4 billion.

The Algerian national oil company is Sonatrach, which plays a key role in all aspects of the oil and natural gas sectors in Algeria. All foreign operators must work in partnership with Sonatrach, which usually has majority ownership in production-sharing agreements.

Access to biocapacity in Algeria is lower than world average. In 2016, Algeria had 0.53 global hectares of biocapacity per person within its territory, much less than the world average of 1.6 global hectares per person. In 2016, Algeria used 2.4 global hectares of biocapacity per person – their ecological footprint of consumption. This means they use just under 4.5 times as much biocapacity as Algeria contains. As a result, Algeria is running a biocapacity deficit. In April 2022, diplomats from Italy and Spain held talks after Rome's move to secure large volume of Algerian gas stoked concerns in Madrid. Under the deal between Algeria's Sonatrach and Italy's Eni, Algeria will send an additional 9 billion cubic metres of gas to Italy by next year and in 2024.

Algeria has invested an estimated 100 billion dinars towards developing research facilities and paying researchers. This development programme is meant to advance alternative energy production, especially solar and wind power. Algeria is rapidly advancing its renewable energy agenda, targeting 15,000 megawatts (MW) or the equivalent of 15 gigawatts (GW) of solar power capacity by 2035 to reduce dependence on natural gas there are 45 active solar power projects in Algeria, valued at a combined US$6.1 billion. Algeria currently produces approximately 27,000 MW (27 GW) of electricity, according to ministry data. For 2026, Algeria is to commission nine solar power plants totalling 1,480 MW (1.48 GW) by August for the first phase of the program to produce 3,200 MW (3.2 GW) of renewable energy which will also include the Ghar Djebilet solar power station and the Adrar wind farm for the entire program. Algeria is estimated to have the largest solar energy potential in the Mediterranean, so the government has funded the creation of a solar science park in Hassi R'Mel. Currently, Algeria has 20,000 research professors at various universities and over 780 research labs, with state-set goals to expand to 1,000. Besides solar energy, areas of research in Algeria include space and satellite telecommunications, nuclear power and medical research.

=== Tourism ===
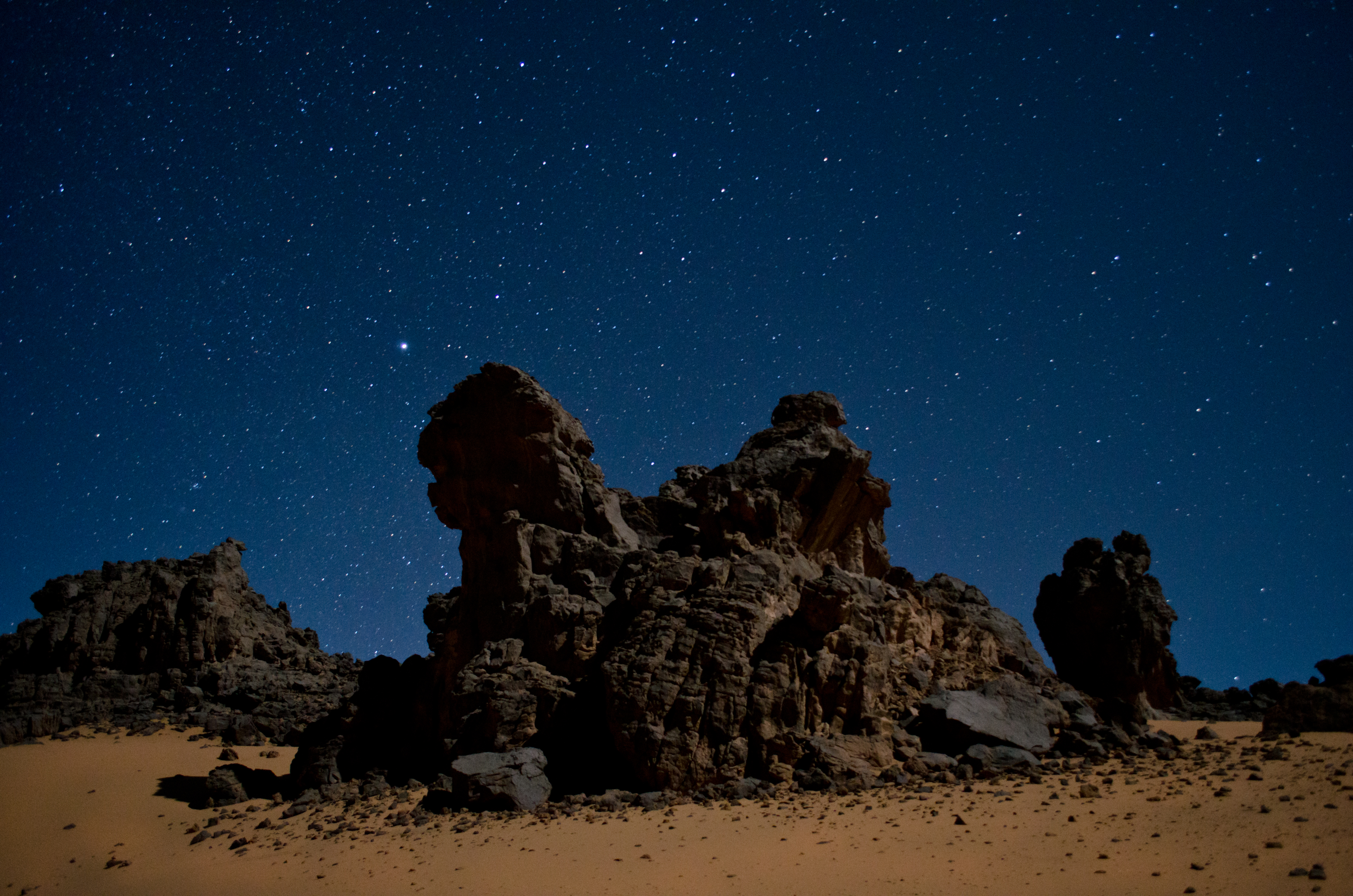
Djanet

The development of the tourism sector in Algeria had previously been hampered by a lack of facilities, but since 2004 a broad tourism development strategy has been implemented resulting in many hotels of a high modern standard being built.

There are several UNESCO World Heritage Sites in Algeria which includes Al Qal'a of Beni Hammad, the first capital of the Hammadid empire; Tipasa, a Phoenician and later Roman town; Djémila and Timgad, both Roman ruins; M'Zab Valley, a limestone valley containing a large urbanised oasis; and the Casbah of Algiers, an important citadel. The only natural World Heritage Site in Algeria is the Tassili n'Ajjer, a mountain range.

=== Transport ===
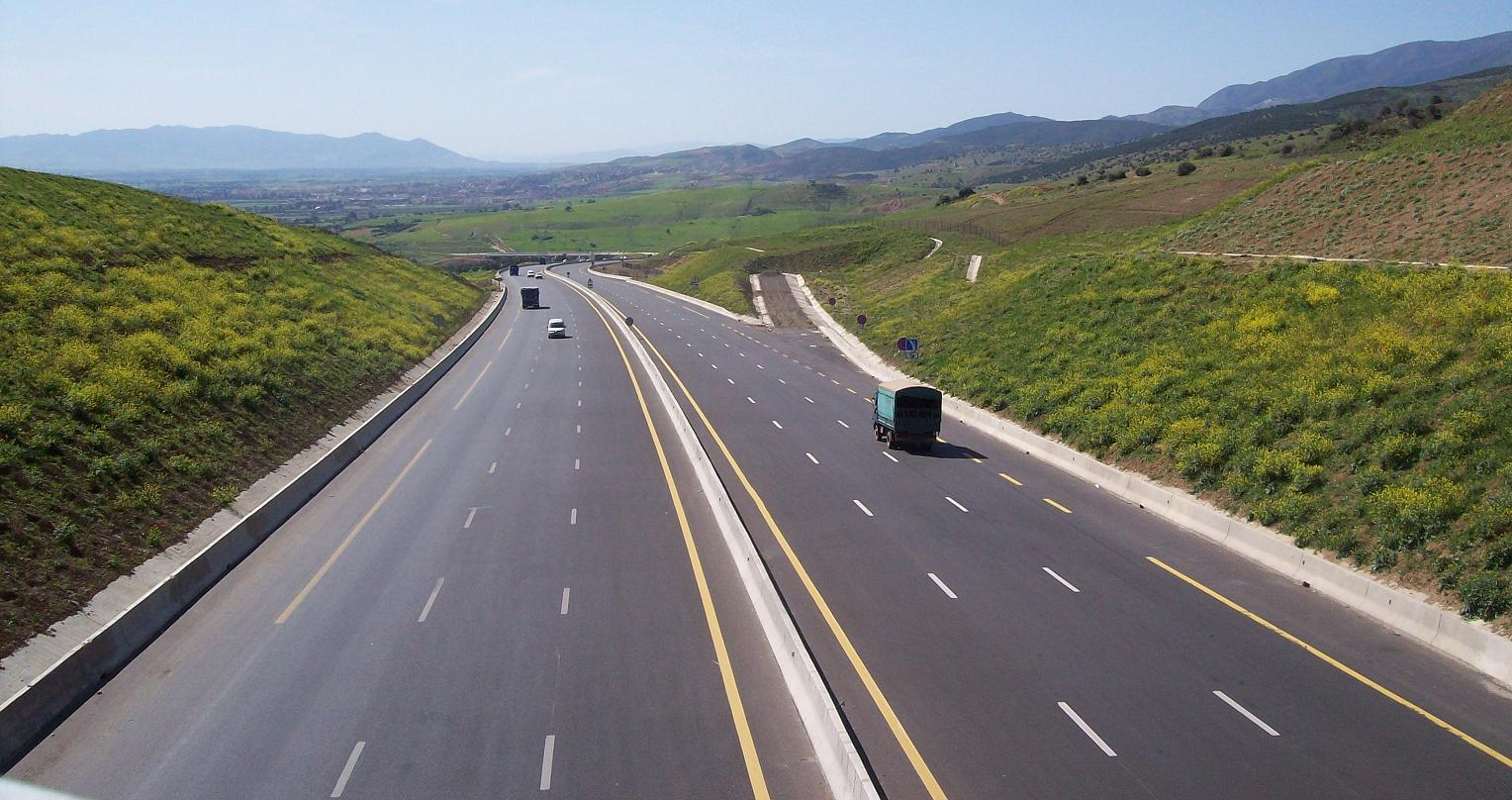
The main highway connecting the Moroccan to the Tunisian border was a part of the Cairo–Dakar Highway project.

Two trans-African automobile routes pass through Algeria:

- Cairo-Dakar Highway
- Algiers-Lagos Highway

The Algerian road network is the densest in Africa; its length is estimated at 180,000 km (110,000 mi) of highways, with more than 3,756 structures and a paving rate of 85%. This network has been complemented by the East-West Highway, a major infrastructure project completed in 2023. It is a three-way, 1,216-kilometre-long (756 mi) highway, linking Annaba in the extreme east to the Tlemcen in the far west. Algeria is also crossed by the Trans-Sahara Highway, which is now completely paved. This road is supported by the Algerian government to increase trade between the six countries crossed: Algeria, Mali, Niger, Nigeria, Chad, and Tunisia.

== Demographics ==
At the outset of the 20th century, Algeria's population was approximately 4 million. in 2024, Algeria has a population of an estimated 47.4 million. About 90% of Algerians live in the northern, coastal area; the inhabitants of the Sahara desert are mainly concentrated in oases, although some 1.5 million remain nomadic or semi-nomadic. 28.1% of Algerians are under the age of 15.

Between 90,000 and 165,000 Sahrawis from Western Sahara live in the Sahrawi refugee camps, in the western Algerian Sahara desert. There are also more than 4,000 Palestinian refugees, who are well integrated and have not asked for assistance from the United Nations High Commissioner for Refugees (UNHCR). In 2009, 35,000 Chinese migrant workers lived in Algeria. There are also many other foreign communities in Algeria.

=== Largest cities ===
Largest cities or towns in Algeria According to the 2008 Census
Rank	Name	Province	Pop.	Rank	Name	Province	Pop.
1	Algiers	Algiers Province	2,364,230	11	Tébessa	Tébessa Province	194,461
2	Oran	Oran Province	803,329	12	El Oued	El Oued Province	186,525
3	Constantine	Constantine Province	448,028	13	Skikda	Skikda Province	182,903
4	Annaba	Annaba Province	342,703	14	Tiaret	Tiaret Province	178,915
5	Blida	Blida Province	331,779	15	Béjaïa	Béjaïa Province	176,139
6	Batna	Batna Province	289,504	16	Tlemcen	Tlemcen Province	173,531
7	Djelfa	Djelfa Province	265,833	17	Ouargla	Ouargla Province	169,928
8	Sétif	Sétif Province	252,127	18	Béchar	Béchar Province	165,241
9	Sidi Bel Abbès	Sidi Bel Abbès Province	210,146	19	Mostaganem	Mostaganem Province	162,885
10	Biskra	Biskra Province	204,661	20	Bordj Bou Arréridj	Bordj Bou Arréridj Province	158,812

=== Ethnic groups ===
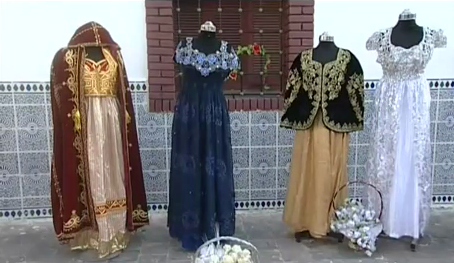
Some of Algeria's traditional clothes

Arabs and indigenous Berbers as well as Phoenicians, Romans, Vandals, Byzantine Greeks, Turks, various Sub-Saharan Africans, and French have contributed to the history and culture of Algeria. Descendants of Andalusi refugees are also present in the population of Algiers and other cities. Moreover, Spanish was spoken by these Aragonese and Castilian Morisco descendants deep into the 18th century, and even Catalan was spoken at the same time by Catalan Morisco descendants in the small town of Grish El-Oued.

Although Algerian law forbids population censuses based on ethnic, religious and linguistic criteria estimates published in non-official sources suggest 75% to 85% of Algeria's population are Arabs. with around 20%–30% identifying as Berber. No official census data in Algeria exist to verify these estimates. Genetic publications on the Algerian population show that the majority of the population is of indigenous Berber ancestry.

The largest groups of Berbers in Algeria are the Kabyles, who live in the Kabylia region east of Algiers, the Chaoui of Northeast Algeria in Aures, the Tuaregs in the southern desert and the Shenwa people of North Algeria. During the colonial period, there was a large (10% in 1960) European population who became known as Pied-Noirs. They were primarily of French, Spanish and Italian origin. Almost all of this population left during the war of independence or immediately after its end.

=== Languages ===
Modern Standard Arabic and Standard Amazigh are the official languages. Algerian Arabic (Dziria) is the language used by the majority of the population. Colloquial Algerian Arabic has some Berber loanwords which represent 8% to 9% of its vocabulary.

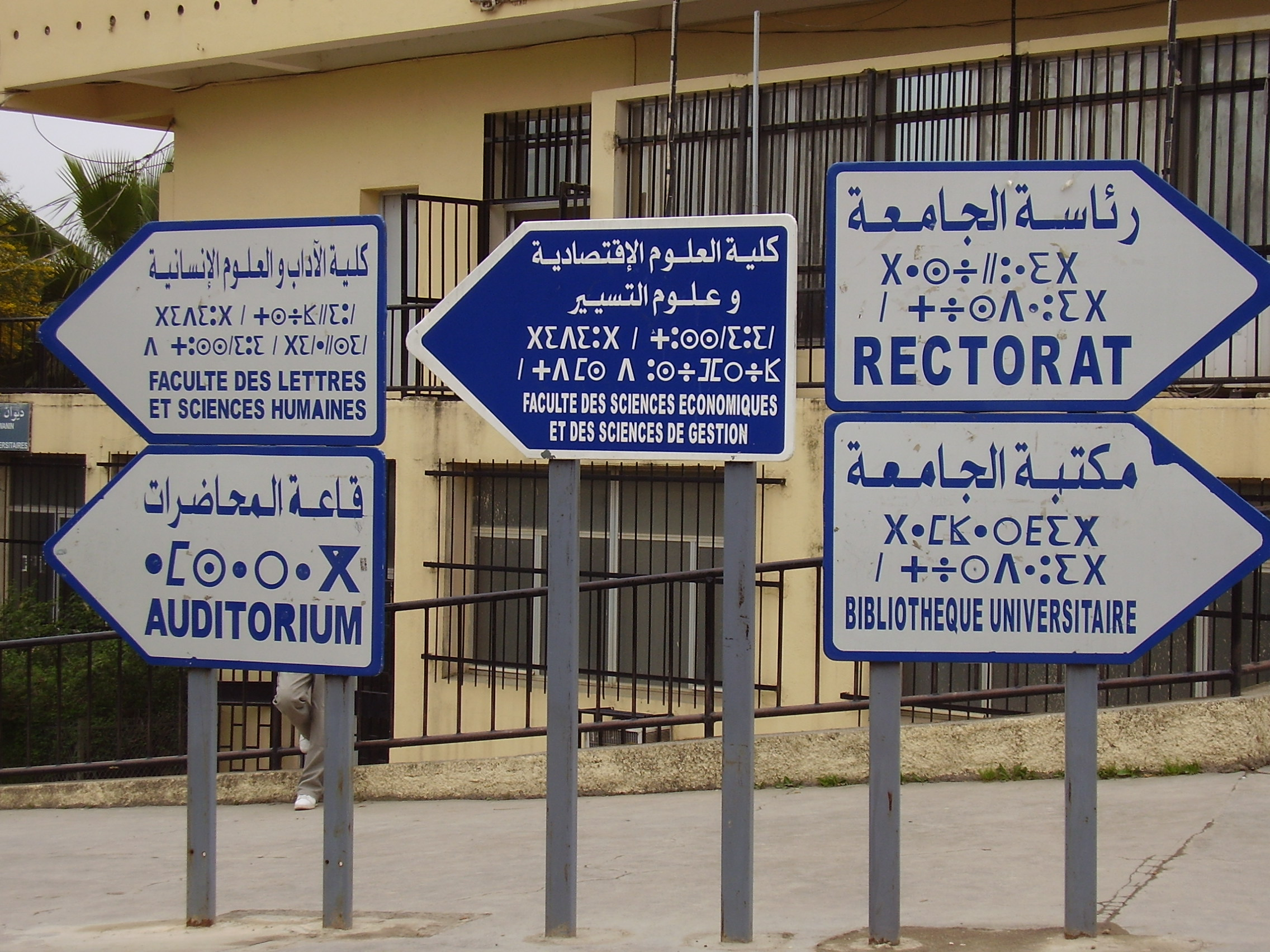
Signs in the University of Tizi Ouzou in three languages: Arabic, Berber, and French

Standard Amazigh has been recognised as a "national language" by the constitutional amendment of 8 May 2002. Kabyle, the predominant Berber language, is taught and is partially co-official (with a few restrictions) in parts of Kabylie. Kabyle has a significant Arabic, French, Latin, Greek, Phoenician and Punic substratum, and Arabic loanwords represent 35% of the total Kabyle vocabulary. In February 2016, the Algerian constitution passed a resolution that made Berber an official language alongside Arabic. Algeria emerged as a bilingual state after 1962. Colloquial Algerian Arabic is spoken by about 83% of the population and Berber by 27%.

Although French has no official status in Algeria, it has one of the largest Francophone populations in the world, and French is widely used in government, media (newspapers, radio, local television), and both the education system (from primary school onwards) and academia due to Algeria's colonial history. It can be regarded as a lingua franca of Algeria. In 2008, 11.2 million Algerians could read and write in French. In 2013, it was estimated that 60% of the population could speak or understand French. In 2022, it was estimated that 33% of the population was Francophone.

The use of English in Algeria, though limited in comparison to the previously mentioned languages, has increased due to globalisation. In 2022 it was announced that English would be taught in elementary schools.

=== Religion ===
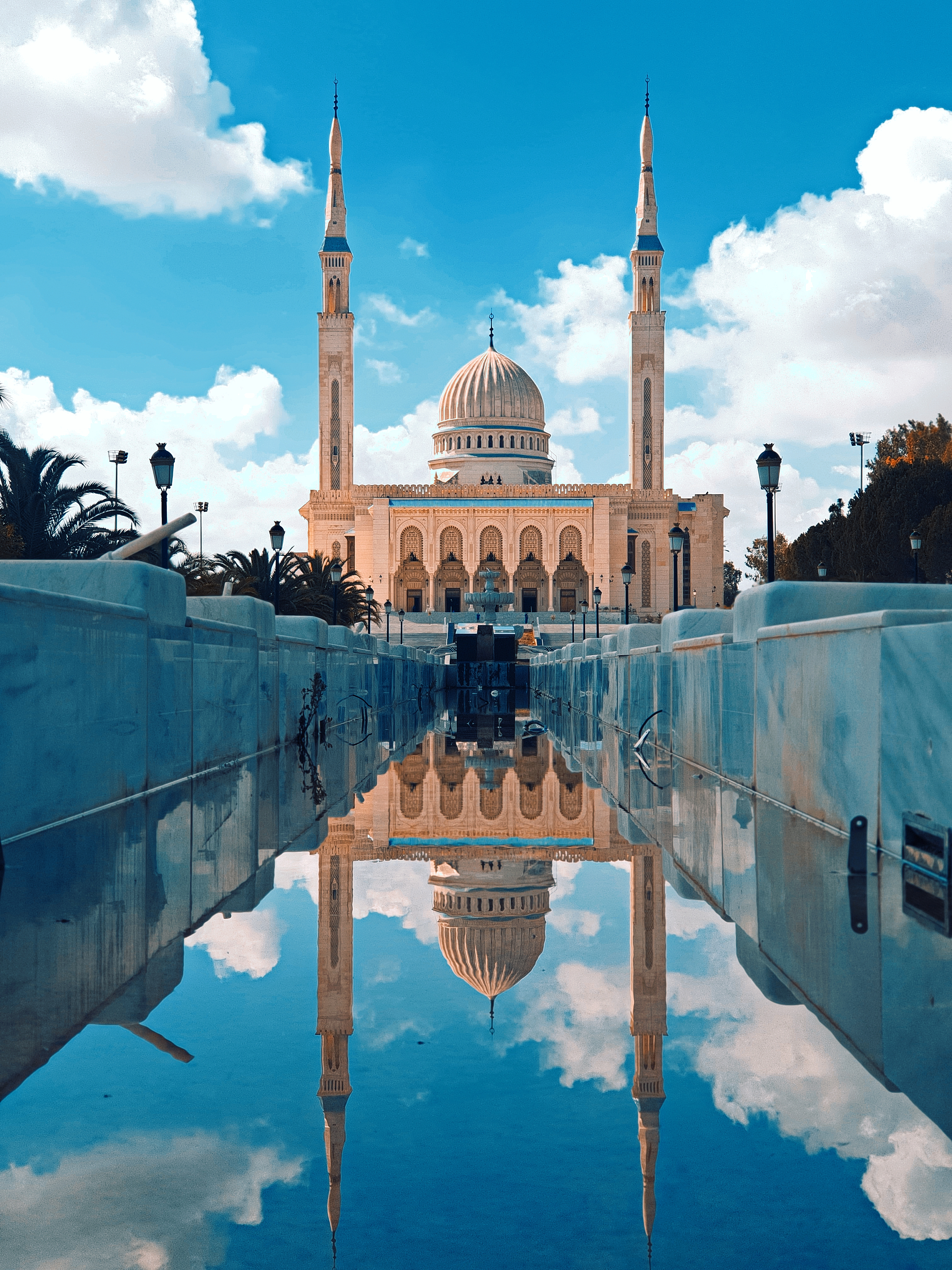
Emir Abdelkader Mosque in Constantine

Islam is the predominant religion in Algeria, with its adherents, mostly Sunnis, accounting for 99% of the population according to a 2021 CIA World Factbook estimate, and 98.4% according to Pew Research in 2020. There are about 290,000 Ibadis in the M'zab Valley in the region of Ghardaia.

Prior to independence, Algeria was home to more than 1.3 million Christians (mostly of European ancestry). Most of these Christian settlers left to France after the Algerian independence. Today, estimates of the Christian population range from 100,000 to 200,000. They are predominantly Protestant. Algerian Christians experience difficulty in proselytization and worship.

According to the Arab Barometer in 2018–2019, the vast majority of Algerians (99.1%) continue to identify as Muslim. The June 2019 Arab Barometer-BBC News report found that Algerians went from 8% identifying as non-religious to around 15% from 2013 to 2018, the increase being youth-driven. However, the 2021 Arab Barometer report found a decrease in irreligiousity, with 2.6% identifying as non-religious.

=== Health and Education ===
In 2018, Algeria had the highest numbers of physicians in the Maghreb region (1.72 per 1,000 people), nurses (2.23 per 1,000 people), and dentists (0.31 per 1,000 people). Access to "improved water sources" was around 97.4% of the population in urban areas and 98.7% of the population in the rural areas. Some 99% of Algerians living in urban areas, and around 93.4% of those living in rural areas, had access to "improved sanitation". According to the World Bank, Algeria is making progress towards its goal of "reducing by half the number of people without sustainable access to improved drinking water and basic sanitation by 2015". Given Algeria's young population, policy favours preventive health care and clinics over hospitals. In keeping with this policy, the government maintains an immunisation programme. However, poor sanitation and unclean water still cause tuberculosis, hepatitis, measles, typhoid fever, cholera and dysentery. The poor generally receive healthcare free of charge.

Health records have been maintained in Algeria since 1882 and began adding Muslims living in the south to their vital record database in 1905 during French rule.

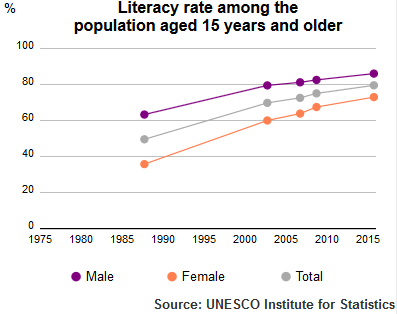
UIS literacy rate Algeria population plus 15 1985–2015

Since the 1970s, in a centralised system that was designed to significantly reduce the rate of illiteracy, the Algerian government introduced a decree by which school attendance became compulsory for all children aged between 6 and 15 years who have the ability to track their learning through the 20 facilities built since independence, now the literacy rate is around 92.6%. Since 1972, Arabic is used as the language of instruction during the first nine years of schooling. From the third year, French is taught and it is also the language of instruction for science classes. The students can also learn English, Italian, Spanish and German. In 2008, new programmes at the elementary appeared, therefore the compulsory schooling does not start at the age of six anymore, but at the age of five. Apart from the 122 private schools, the Universities of the State are free of charge. After nine years of primary school, students can go to a high school or to an educational institution. The school offers two programmes: general or technical. At the end of the third year of secondary school, students pass the exam of the baccalaureate, which allows once it is successful to pursue graduate studies in universities and institutes.

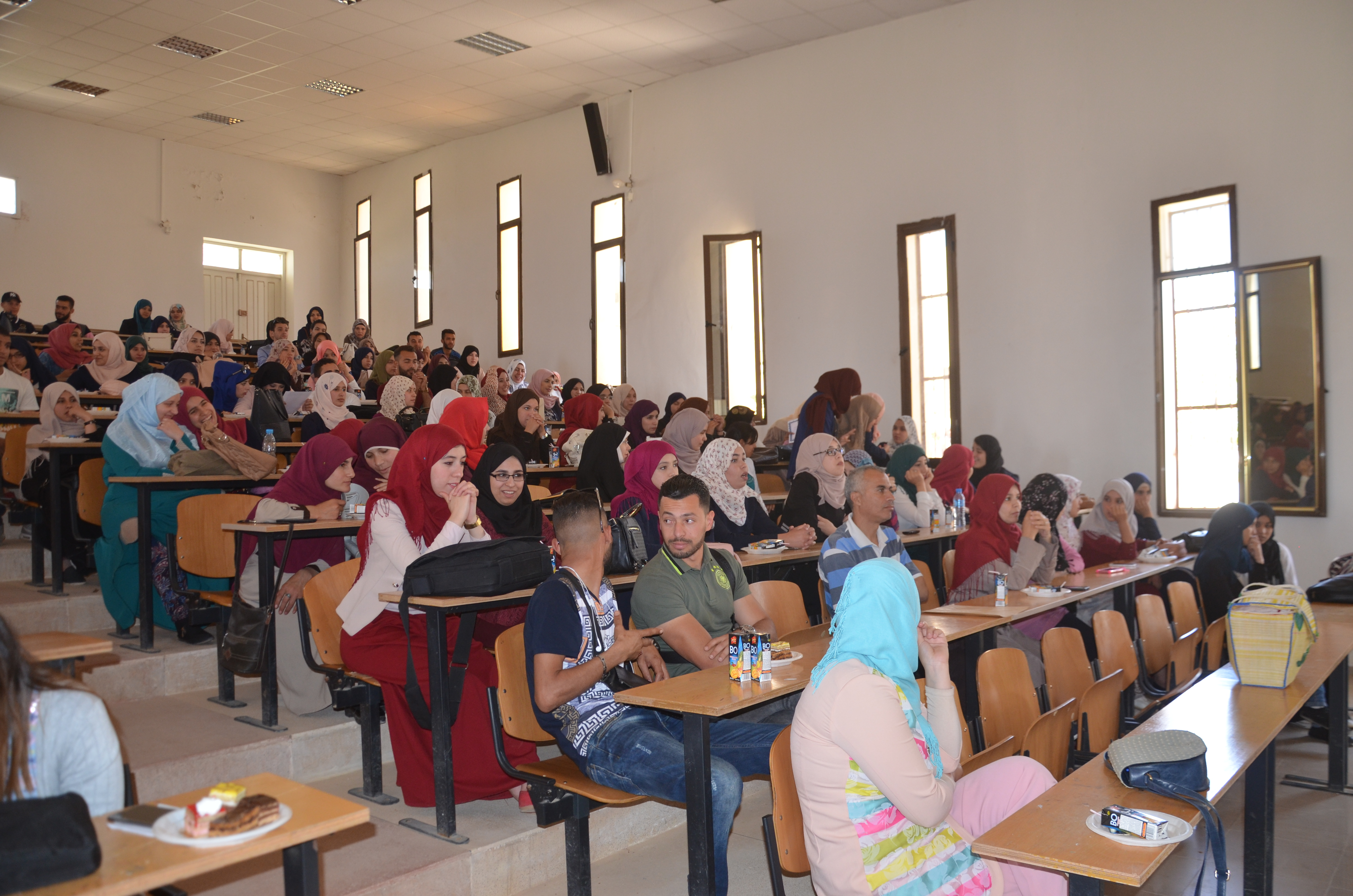
Students at the University of Chlef in Algeria

Education is officially compulsory for children between the ages of six and 15. In 2008, the illiteracy rate for people over 10 was 22.3%, 15.6% for men and 29.0% for women. The province with the lowest rate of illiteracy was Algiers Province at 11.6%, while the province with the highest rate was Djelfa Province at 35.5%.

Algeria has 26 universities and 67 institutions of higher education, which must accommodate a million Algerians and 80,000 foreign students in 2008. The University of Algiers, founded in 1879, is the oldest, it offers education in various disciplines (law, medicine, science and letters). Twenty-five of these universities and almost all of the institutions of higher education were founded after the independence of the country.

Even if some of them offer instruction in Arabic like areas of law and the economy, most of the other sectors such as science and medicine continue to be provided in French and English. Among the most important universities, there are the University of Sciences and Technology Houari Boumediene, the University of Mentouri Constantine, and University of Oran Es-Senia. The University of Abou Bekr Belkaïd in Tlemcen and University of Batna Hadj Lakhdar occupy the 26th and 45th row in Africa. Algeria was ranked 115th in the Global Innovation Index in 2024, and kept the same rank in the index of 2025.

== Culture ==
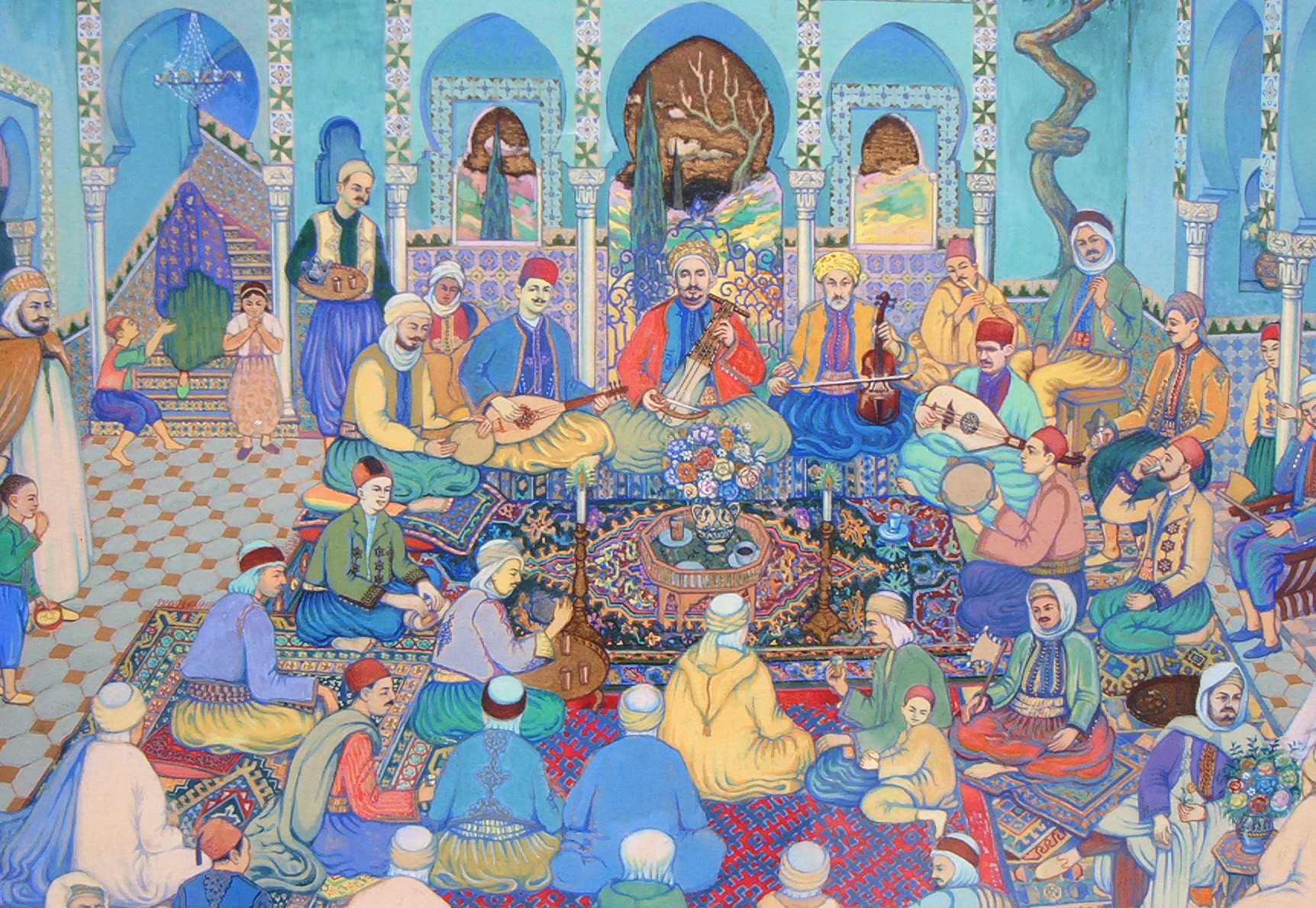
Algerian musicians in Tlemcen, Regency of Algiers; by Bachir Yellès

Modern Algerian literature, split between Arabic, Tamazight and French, has been strongly influenced by the country's recent history. Famous novelists of the 20th century include Mohammed Dib, Albert Camus, Kateb Yacine and Ahlam Mosteghanemi while Assia Djebar is widely translated. Among the important novelists of the 1980s were Rachid Mimouni, later vice-president of Amnesty International, and Tahar Djaout, murdered by an Islamist group in 1993 for his secularist views.

Malek Bennabi and Frantz Fanon are noted for their thoughts on decolonisation; Augustine of Hippo was born in Tagaste (modern-day Souk Ahras); and Ibn Khaldun, though born in Tunis, wrote the Muqaddima while staying in Algeria. The works of the Sanusi family in pre-colonial times, and of Emir Abdelkader and Sheikh Ben Badis in colonial times, are widely noted. The Latin author Apuleius was born in Madaurus (Mdaourouch), in what later became Algeria.

Contemporary Algerian cinema is varied in terms of genre, exploring a wider range of themes and issues. There has been a transition from cinema which focused on the war of independence to films more concerned with the everyday lives of Algerians.

=== Art ===
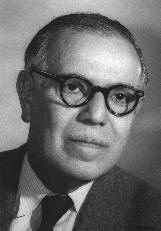
Mohammed Racim; founder of the Algerian school for painting

Algerian painters, like Mohammed Racim and Baya, attempted to revive the prestigious Algerian past prior to French colonisation, at the same time that they have contributed to the preservation of the authentic values of Algeria. In this line, Mohamed Temam, Abdelkhader Houamel have also returned through this art, scenes from the history of the country, the habits and customs of the past and the country life. Other new artistic currents including the one of M'hamed Issiakhem, Mohammed Khadda and Bachir Yelles, appeared on the scene of Algerian painting, abandoning figurative classical painting to find new pictorial ways, to adapt Algerian paintings to the new realities of the country through its struggle and its aspirations. Mohammed Khadda and M'hamed Issiakhem have been notable in recent years.

=== Literature ===
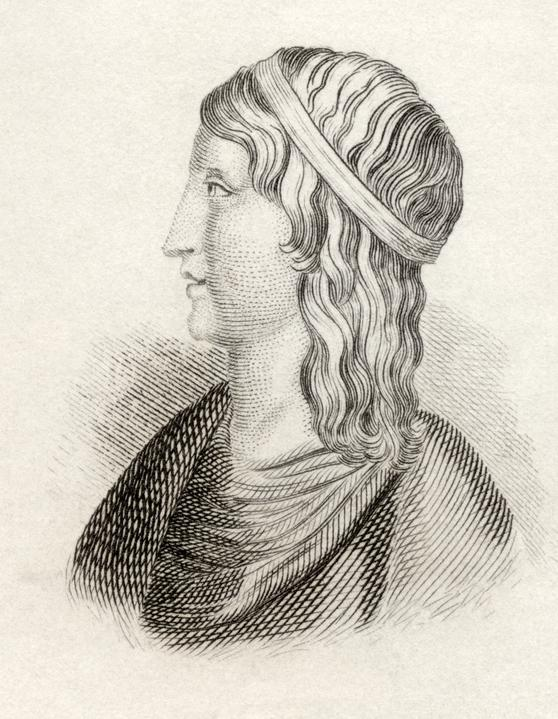
Apuleius

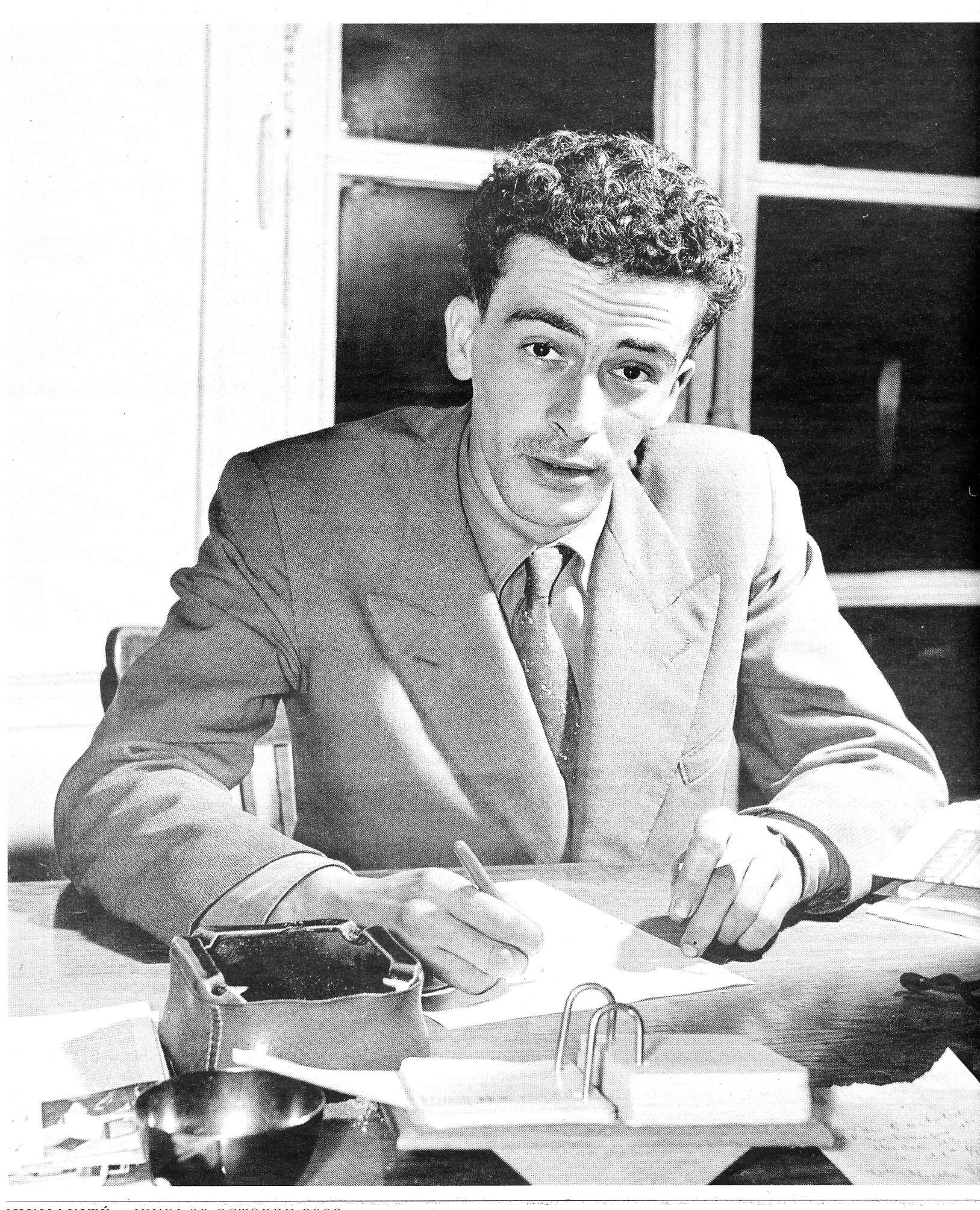
Kateb Yacine

The roots of Algerian literature go back to the Numidian and Roman African era, when Apuleius wrote The Golden Ass, the only Latin novel to survive in its entirety. This period also saw Augustine of Hippo, Nonius Marcellus and Martianus Capella. The Middle Ages also saw several Arabic writers who contributed to Arab literature, with authors like Ahmad al-Buni, Ibn Manzur and Ibn Khaldun, who wrote the Muqaddimah while staying in Algeria. Albert Camus was an Algerian-born French Pied-Noir author. In 1957, he was awarded the Nobel Prize in Literature.

Algerian literature contains works whose main concern is the assertion of Algerian national entity. Examples include novels such as the Algerian trilogy by Mohammed Dib, and Nedjma by Kateb Yacine. Other writers in Algerian literature include Mouloud Feraoun, Malek Bennabi, Malek Haddad, Moufdi Zakaria, Abdelhamid Ben Badis, Mohamed Laïd Al-Khalifa, Mouloud Mammeri, Frantz Fanon, and Assia Djebar.

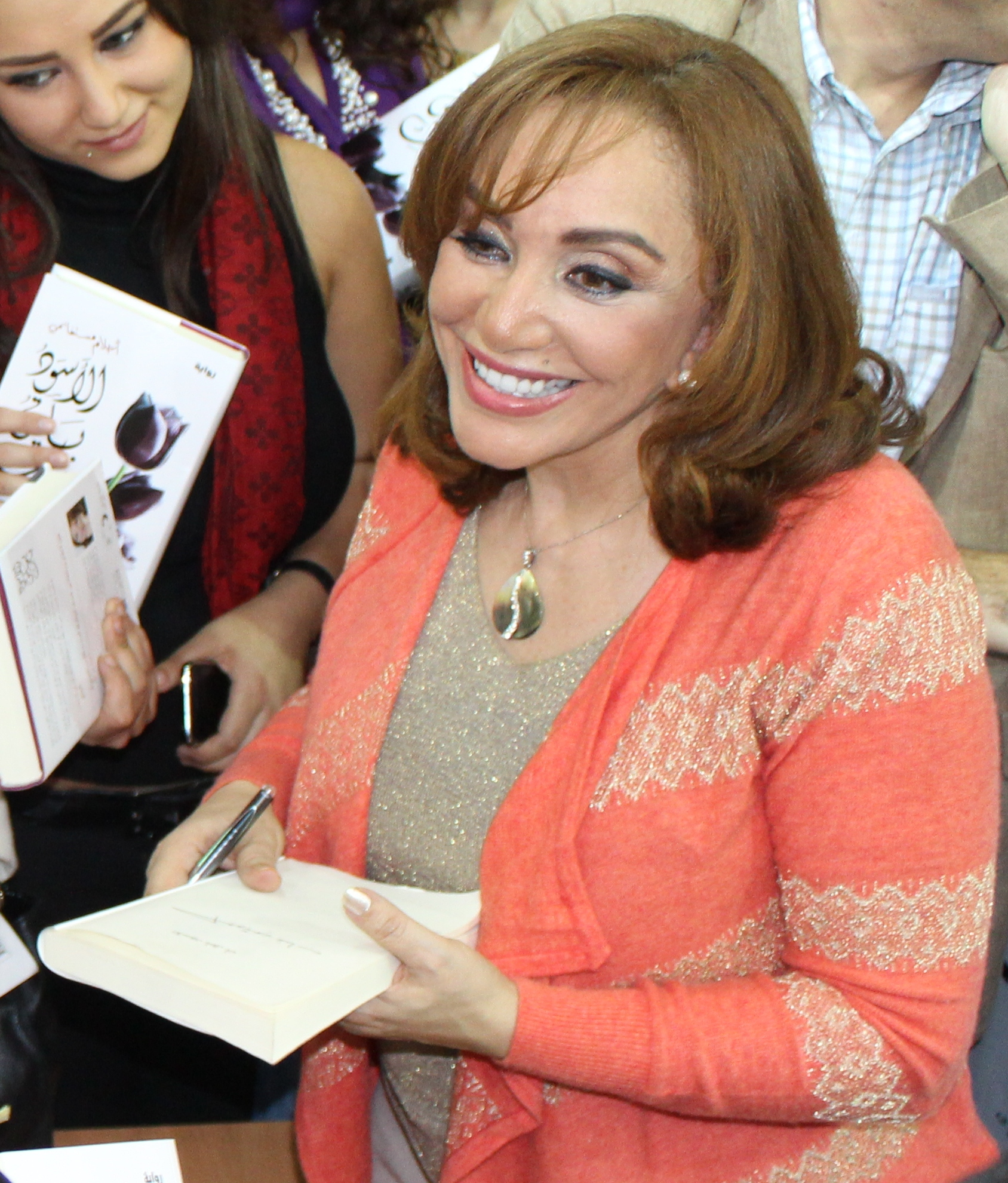
Ahlam Mosteghanemi, the most widely read female writer in the Arab world

In the aftermath of Independence, new authors emerged on the Algerian literary scene, they attempted to expose social problems, among them there are Rachid Boudjedra, Rachid Mimouni, Leila Sebbar, Tahar Djaout and Tahar Ouettar.

=== Cinema ===
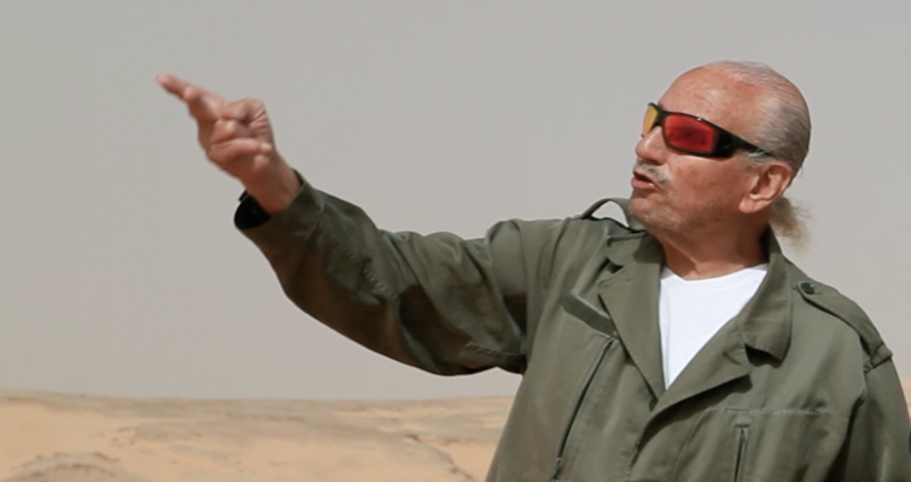
Mohammed Lakhdar-Hamina, one of the most prominent figures in contemporary Arabic cinema

The Algerian state's interest in film-industry activities can be seen in the annual budget of DZD 200 million (EUR 1.3 million) allocated to production, specific measures and an ambitious programme plan implemented by the Ministry of Culture to promote national production, renovate the cinema stock and remedy the weak links in distribution and exploitation.

The financial support provided by the state, through the Fund for the Development of the Arts, Techniques and the Film Industry (FDATIC) and the Algerian Agency for Cultural Influence (AARC), plays a key role in the promotion of national production. Between 2007 and 2013, FDATIC subsidised 98 films (feature films, documentaries and short films). In mid-2013, AARC had already supported a total of 78 films, including 42 feature films, 6 short films and 30 documentaries.

According to the European Audiovisual Observatory's LUMIERE database, 41 Algerian films were distributed in Europe between 1996 and 2013; 21 films in this repertoire were Algerian-French co-productions. Days of Glory (2006) and Outside the Law (2010) recorded the highest number of admissions in the European Union, 3,172,612 and 474,722, respectively.

Algeria won the Palme d'Or for Chronicle of the Years of Fire (1975), two Oscars for Z (1969), and other awards for the Italian-Algerian movie The Battle of Algiers.

=== Cuisine ===
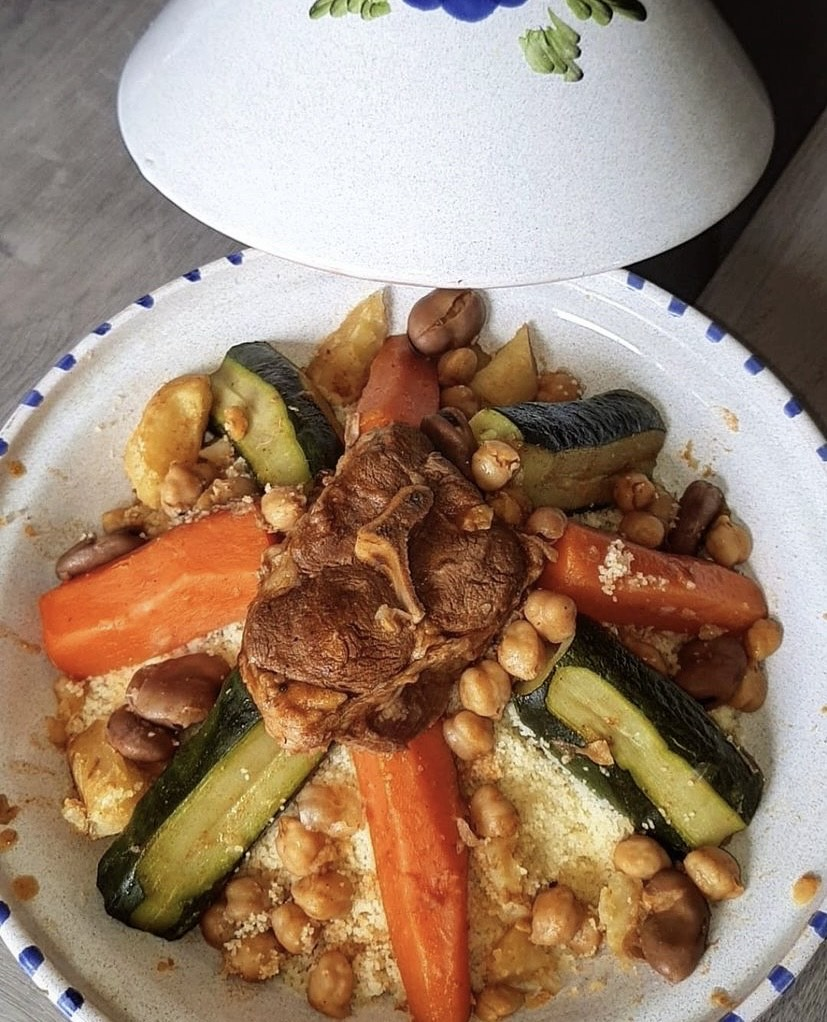
Couscous, the national dish of Algeria

Algerian cuisine is rich and diverse as a result of interactions and exchanges with other cultures and nations over the centuries. It is based on both land and sea products. Conquests or demographic movement towards the Algerian territory were two of the main factors of exchanges between the different peoples and cultures. The Algerian cuisine is a mix of Arab, Berber, Turkish and French roots.

Algerian cuisine offers a variety of dishes depending on the region and the season, but vegetables and cereals remain at its core. Most of the Algerian dishes are centred around bread, meats (lamb, beef or poultry), olive oil, vegetables, and fresh herbs. Vegetables are often used for salads, soups, tajines, and sauce-based dishes. Of all the Algerian traditional dishes available, the most famous one is couscous, recognised as a national dish.

=== Sports ===
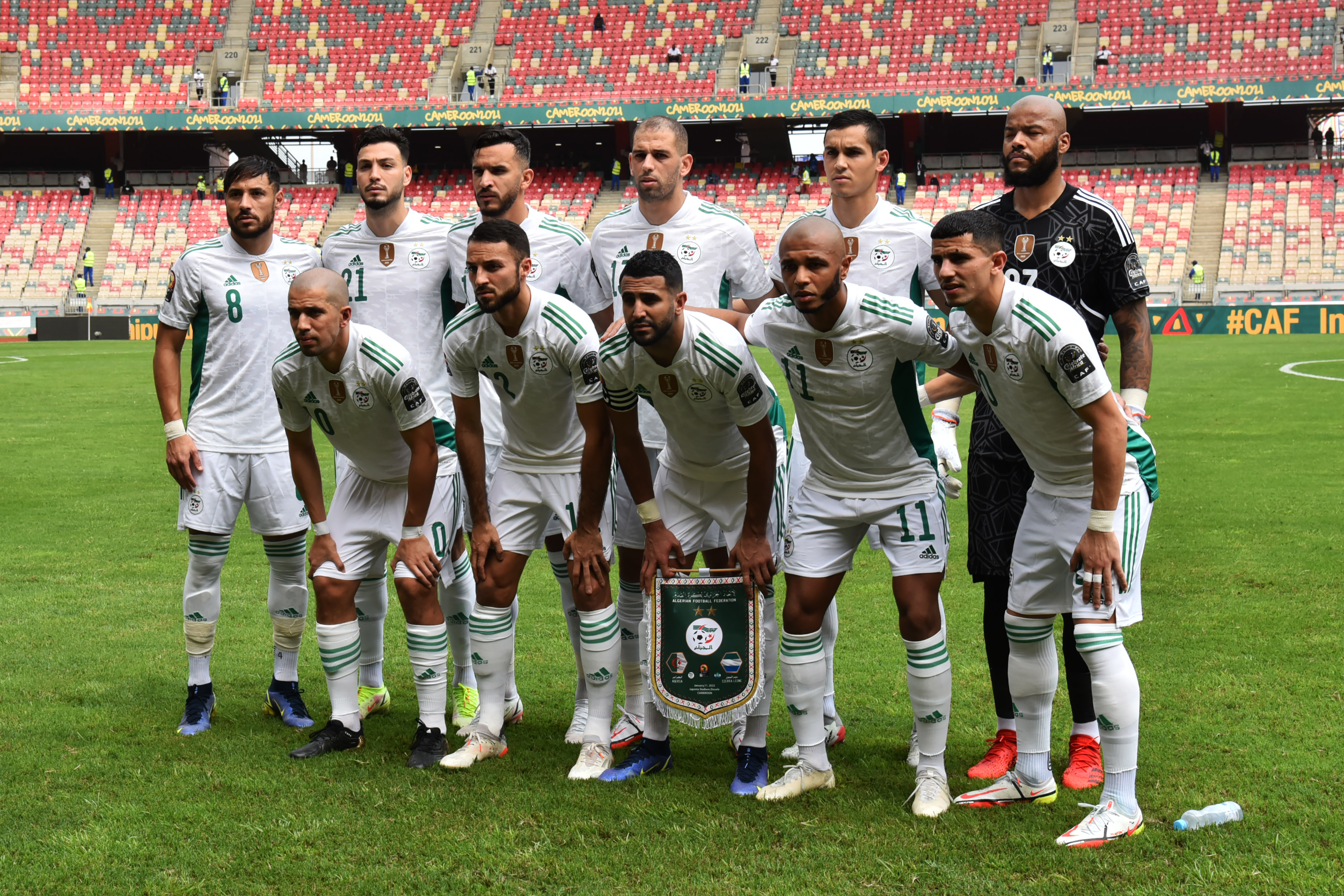
The Algeria national football team in 2022

Various games have existed in Algeria since antiquity. In the Aures, people played several games such as El Kherba or El Khergueba (chess variant). Playing cards, checkers and chess games are part of Algerian culture. Racing (fantasia) and rifle shooting are part of cultural recreation of the Algerians.

Football is the most popular sport in the country. The Algerian national football team, known as the Desert Foxes, has a strong fan base and has achieved success both domestically and internationally.

== See also ==
- Outline of Algeria

== Bibliography ==
- Ageron, Charles-Robert (1991). Modern Algeria – A History from 1830 to the Present. Translated from French and edited by Michael Brett. London: Hurst. ISBN 978-0-86543-266-6.
- Aghrout, Ahmed; Bougherira, Redha M. (2004). Algeria in Transition – Reforms and Development Prospects. Routledge. ISBN 978-0-415-34848-5.
- Bennoune, Mahfoud (1988). The Making of Contemporary Algeria – Colonial Upheavals and Post-Independence Development, 1830–1987. Cambridge: Cambridge University Press. ISBN 978-0-521-30150-3.
- Christelow, Allan (1985) Muslim Law Courts and the French Colonial State in Algeria. Princeton University Press.
- Fanon, Frantz (1966; 2005 paperback). The Wretched of the Earth. Grove Press. ASIN B0007FW4AW, ISBN 978-0-8021-4132-3.
- Gibson, Walcot; Cana, Frank Richardson; Girault, Arthur (1911). "Algeria" . In Chisholm, Hugh (ed.). Encyclopædia Britannica. Vol. 1 (11th ed.). Cambridge University Press. pp. 642–653.
- Horne, Alistair (1977). A Savage War of Peace: Algeria 1954–1962. Viking Adult. ISBN 978-0-670-61964-1, ISBN 978-1-59017-218-6 (2006 reprint)
- Laouisset, Djamel (2009). A Retrospective Study of the Algerian Iron and Steel Industry. New York City: Nova Publishers. ISBN 978-1-61761-190-2.
- Roberts, Hugh (2003). The Battlefield – Algeria, 1988–2002. Studies in a Broken Polity. London: Verso Books. ISBN 978-1-85984-684-1.
- Ruedy, John (1992). Modern Algeria – The Origins and Development of a Nation. Bloomington: Indiana University Press. ISBN 978-0-253-34998-9.
- Stora, Benjamin (2001). Algeria, 1830–2000 – A Short History. Ithaca, New York: Cornell University Press. ISBN 978-0-8014-3715-1.
- Sidaoui, Riadh (2009). "Islamic Politics and the Military – Algeria 1962–2008". Religion and Politics – Islam and Muslim Civilisation. Farnham: Ashgate Publishing. ISBN 0-7546-7418-5.
