= 1920 Algerian Political Rights Petition =

Algerian nationalist document (1920)

- Author: Khalid ibn Hashim; Mohamed Seghir Boushaki
- Original title: Pétition n°30, Pétition du 18 juillet 1920, Pétition des droits politiques algériens de 1920
- Language: French
- Subject: Indigénat; Political rights
- Genre: Petition
- Published: French Senate
- Publication date: 18 July 1920
- Publication place: French Algeria

The 1920 Algerian Political Rights Petition was the first petition to claim the political rights of Algerians within French Algeria following the 1919 Algerian municipal elections.

== History ==
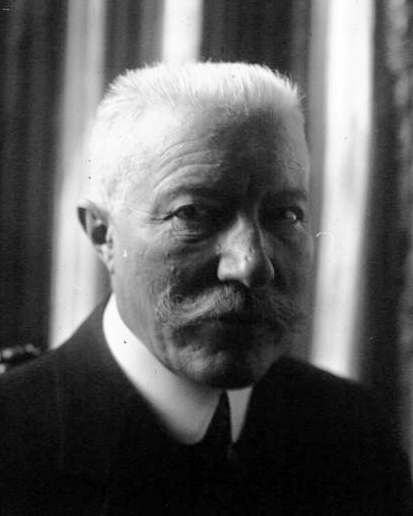
Jonnart Law

The participation of tens of thousands of Algerian soldiers in the battles of the First World War in France and their decisive intervention in the victory against the Imperial German Army earned them rewards after their return to Algeria.

It is in that way that the Jonnart Law allowed veterans and disabled natives to accede to functions in the colonial administration and to obtain real estate in the cities and in the countryside as a sign of assimilation within the framework of the Indigénat code.

The provisions that followed the endorsement of the law on 4 February 1919 made it possible to produce legal texts specifying the trades allowed to native Algerians with consequent restrictions in the administrative professional hierarchy.

However, the municipal elections of 1919 enabled the political representation of the natives to expand in the municipalities as of right, thus producing a new need for political and union freedoms.

Indeed, the general councilor Khalid ibn Hashim in Algiers, as well as the municipal councilor Mohamed Seghir Boushaki as representative of the elected natives, began to ferment and foment a protest action through French institutions ranging from communes to the French Senate, and even so far as writing to US President Woodrow Wilson (1856–1924).

== Petition ==
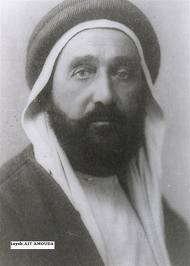
Emir Khaled (1875–1936)

The demand for the political rights of indigenous Algerians after the First World War was concretized by the writing of an official petition dated 18 July 1920 to the French Senate.

This protest document was inspired by the Emir Khaled and made concrete by the many municipal councilors led and represented by Mohamed Seghir Boushaki elected in the full-service municipality of Thénia (formerly Ménerville).

The secretariat of the Senate registered this document under the name of "Petition N°30" having for object the respectful protest of the Algerian indigenous municipal councilors before the Senate against the new provisions of the code of the Indigénat.

Indeed, a bill had been tabled in the Upper House of Parliament by the services of the French Government relating to the modification of the regulations of the regime of the native status in Algeria and the accession of the natives of Algeria to political rights.

== Senate debate ==
It was Senator Charles Cadilhon (1876–1940) who was mandated and appointed by the French Senate to report the discussions and debates of other senators on its content claims, and this during the session of May 19, 1921.

This senator from the Landes then noted in his report that the bill modifying the code of the Indigénat to which the petition related had indeed been adopted and endorsed by the two French parliamentary assemblies.

Indeed, the government project had become the law of 4 August 1920 (French: Loi du 4 août 1920), after its majority adoption by the deputies and senators, and this law was then published after its definitive promulgation in the Journal officiel de la République française on 6 August 1920, starting on page 11287.

At the conclusion of the senatorial debate on "Petition No. 30", the committee, chaired by the rapporteur Charles Cadilhon, finally pronounced negatively on the agenda concerning the extended political rights for the natives, and the refusal and denial was entered in the registers of the Senate.

== See also ==
- 1919 Algerian municipal elections
- Khalid ibn Hashim (1875–1936)
- Mohamed Seghir Boushaki (1869–1959)

== Bibliography ==
- "Pétitions". Sénat: Séance du 18 juillet 1920 (in French). Vol. 73. Paris: Quai Voltaire. 20 May 1921. p. 1172. "Citation: p. 1170"
- "Pétitions". Annales du Sénat: Débats parlementaires (in French). Vol. 94, Partie 2. Paris: Imprimerie des Journaux officiels. 1922. p. 1334. "Citation: p. 1334"
