= Mohamed Seghir Boushaki =

Algerian politician (1869–1959)

- محمد الصغير بوسحاقي

City council of French Algeria in Thenia
- In office 1935–1939
- Governor: Georges Le Beau (1935–1940)

City council of French Algeria in Thenia
- In office 1925–1930
- Governor: Maurice Viollette (1925–1927); Pierre Bordes (1927–1930)

City council of French Algeria in Thenia
- In office 1920–1925
- Governor: Jean-Baptiste Abel (1919–1921); Théodore Steeg (1921–1925); Henri Dubief (1925–1925)

Personal details
- Born: 1869 Thenia, Algiers department, Kabylie, Algeria.
- Died: 1959 (aged 89–90) Thenia, Algiers department, Kabylie, Algeria.
- Resting place: Thénia Cemetery, Algeria
- Spouse(s): Fatma Cherifi; Khdaouedj Tafat Bouzid; Yamna Afiri.

Mohamed Seghir Boushaki (محمد الصغير بوسحاقي), (born 27 November 1869 in Thénia, Boumerdès Province, Kabylie, Algeria; died 1959 in Thenia, Algeria) was an Algerian Kabyle politician after the French conquest of Algeria.

== Presentation ==
Mohamed Seghir Boushaki was born in 1869 in the village of Thala Oufella (Kabyle: ⵟⵀⴰⵍⴰ Oⵓⴼⴻⵍⵍⴰ) called Soumâa (called Arabic: الصومعة) because of the ruins of Benian ntâa Soumâa.

This ancient Berber citadel of Benian ntâa Soumâa was built by King Nubel when the region of Thenia was the capital of Kabylie and Mitidja in North Africa during Antiquity.

The lands ranging from Oued Boumerdès and Oued Meraldene in the west to Oued Isser to the east of the village "Thala Oufella (Soumâa)" belonged to the tribe of "Aïth Aïcha" to which Mohamed belonged Seghir Boushaki before the French conquest of Algeria.

Just two years after the birth of Mohamecd Seghir, all of Kabylie rallied to the "Mokrani Revolt" on 16 March 1871 to expel the French colonial troops from the plain and the heights.

After the defeat of the brotherhood of the Rahmaniya in this Kabyle uprising, the tribal leaders were deported to New Caledonia, among them Cheikh Boumerdassi and "Ahmed Ben Belkacem" the chief of the "Aïth Aïcha" who was close to Mohamed Seghir.

"Ahmed Ben Belkacem", born in 1837 and son of Ahmed, was deported under the "Number 18744".

== Childhood ==
Mohamed Seghir Boushaki grew up in a large family where his elder brother "Ali Boushaki" (1855–1965) was his model.

Their father "Mohamed Boushaki" (1834–1889), known as "Moh Ouaâli" (Arabic: موح واعلي, was one of the survivors of the French expedition against the town of Dellys from 7 to 17 May 1844 and which had decimated dozens of villages of Kabylie, including "Thala Oufella (Soumâa)".

Thus, Mohamed Seghir's grandfather, "Ali Boushaki" (1823–1846) who was married to "Khdaouedj Dekkiche" from Gueraïchene village of Souk El-Had, was one of the Kabyle martyrs during the fighting against the French Conquest of Kabylie, leaving his son "Moh Ouaâli" orphaned.

The massacre of Jacques Leroy de Saint Arnaud completed and the village of "Thala Oufella (Soumâa)" devastated, the widowed grandmother "Khdaouedj Dekkiche" could only preserve her child "Moh Ouaâli" taking him with her to her parents in the village of Gueraïchene (Arabic: إيقرعيشن) at Souk El-Had until her puberty and the reconstruction of his native village in "Aïth Aïcha" tribe.

After his return to "Thala Oufella" in 1852 at the age of 18, "Mohamed Boushaki (Moh Ouaâli)" married his cousin "Aïcha Ishak-Boushaki" from Meraldene village who bore "Ali Boushaki" in 1855 and then of "Mohamed Seghir Boushaki" in 1869.

== Education ==
Mohamed Seghir Boushaki began his Quranic studies in the reconstructed Zawiyet Sidi Boushaki in the village of "Thala Oufella" near the mausoleum of his great-grandfather Sidi Boushaki (1394–1453) who was one of the berber scholars and theologians before the arrival of the Ottomans in Algeria.

Meanwhile, the plain of Mountain pass of "Aïth Aïcha" tribe, north of "Thala Oufella" village, was colonized as early as 1871 by Alsatian and Lorraine farmers who came from France to found the town of Ménerville.

Thus, from 1874 to 1881, Mohamed Seghir grazed the herds of the village with his brother Ali and his cousins while continuing his Muslim teaching in his native village.

After the creation of the Arab offices in Kabylie and the establishment of the registers of the civil state by the governor Louis Tirman, new patronyms were attributed to the families of "Aïth Aïcha" tribe, and identity papers were handed to the villagers, allowing Mohamed Seghir Boushaki to continue his studies at Zawiyet Sidi Boumerdassi and Zawiyet Sidi Amar Cherif, and also at Tizi Ouzou in the "Zawiya of Sheikh Mohand Ameziane" where he became acquainted with many of the futur notables of the Great Kabylie.

The deep recitations and exegesis received by Mohamed Seghir in the Tizi Ouzou Zawiyas, as well as the measured attendance of French settlers, allowed him to anchor in the Berber-Arab culture on the one hand, and to open up on the accomplished fact of the European presence in Kabylie of another coast, thus endowing him with the trilingual asset for the pursuit of his political and social journey.

== Work ==
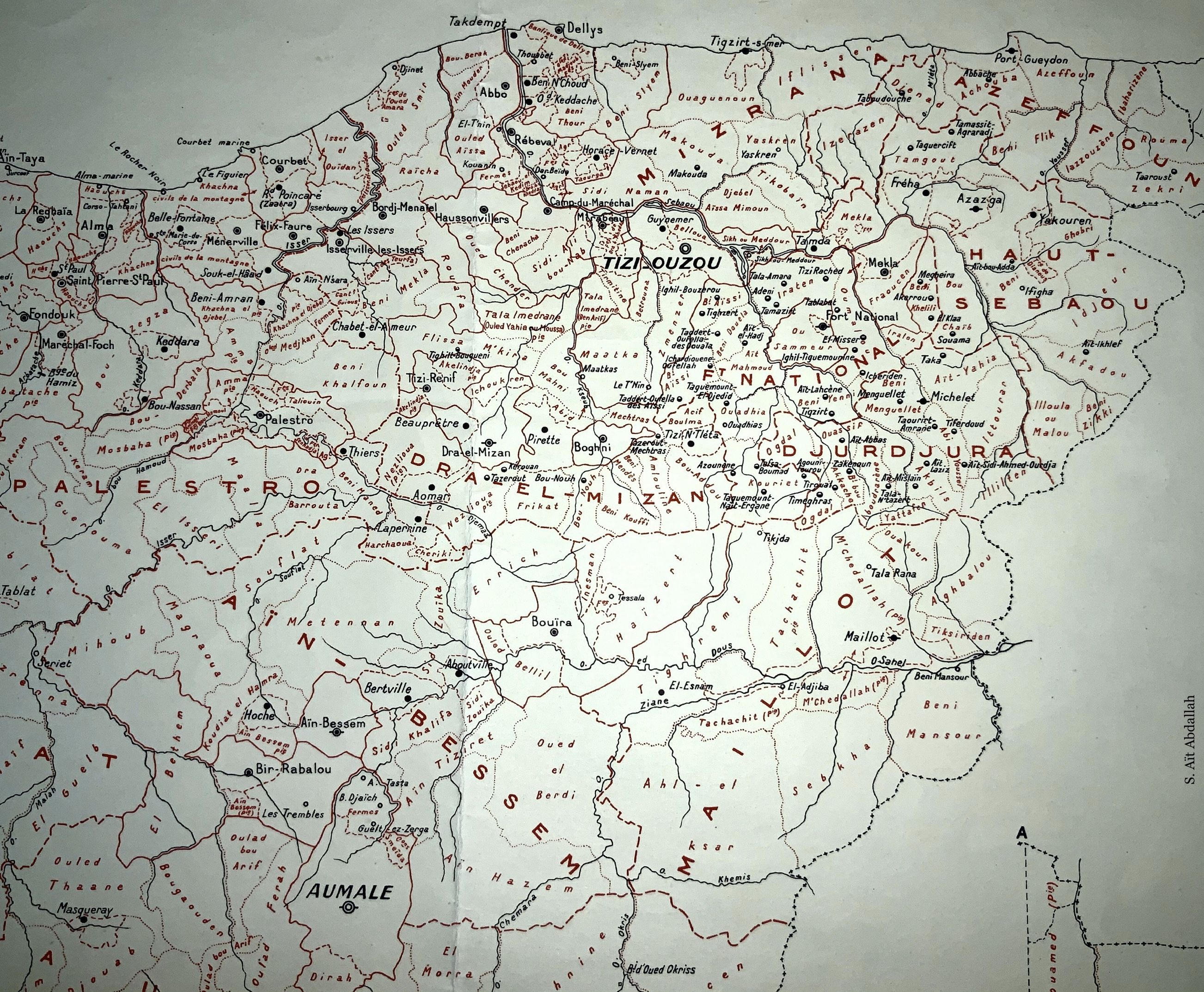
Kabylie tribes

After ten years of Islamic studies in Great Kabylie, Mohamed Seghir Boushaki settled in his village "Thala Oufella (Soumâa)" in 1891 and began to work in agriculture and commerce.

He specializes in carob tree arboriculture by weaving a professional carob bean harvesting network for sale in the state and for processing into locust bean gum and carob bean molasses.

He soon gained notable profits which allowed him to rent a house in the French colony of Ménerville (Thénia) bordering "Oued Arbia" in which he married in 1898 at the age of 29 with Fatma Cherifi, daughter of a rich family residing near Zawiyet Sidi Amar Cherif in Sidi Daoud along the Sebaou River.

Mohamed Seghir assiduously transformed the mesh of collection of carob bean in Kabylie into a network of inter-village alliances by marriage in the former Algiers Department regrouping the current wilayas of Algiers, Boumerdes, Tizi Ouzou, Bouira, Blida and Tipaza.

While remaining a fervent supporter of the Sufi Tariqa of the Rahmaniyya, he frequently frequented the two mosques of Sidi M'hamed Bou Qobrine in Bounouh (Boghni) and Hamma (Algiers), and as soon as he had his first boy in 1907, he named him "M'Hamed Boushaki" in memory of the kabyle theologian "M'Hamed Ben Abderrahmane El Azhari".

His intense commercial activity allowed him to attend the weekly markets throughout Kabylie where trading transactions and marriage agreements were negotiated.

== World War I ==
Mohamed Seghir Boushaki lost his first wife "Fatma Cherifi" in 1914 shortly before the outbreak of the World War I when he had reached the age of 45, leaving him several orphaned children to his charge and responsibility.

He then quickly remarried with "Khdaouedj Tafat Bouzid" from the village "Aïth Thafath" in Chabet el Ameur, who took care of the orphans and then bore him several other new toddlers.

The colonial French, surrounded by the German troops and Stormtrooper, appealed to the young Algerians in the ranks of its army in the metropolis with the promise to give them in exchange more rights citizens in Algeria and why not the total independence.

Several young kabyles of the Khachna and Great Kabylie were recruited on French front in Europe, among them close relatives of Mohamed Seghir.

One of these kabyle soldiers is the son of his brother "Ali Boushaki", his nephew "Abderrahmane Boushaki" who was a corporal in the "1st regiment of Algerian sharpshooters" from 1914 to 1918.

The distinctions and decorations after the return of the nephew "Abderrahmane Boushaki" mutilated from France gave him as well as his family and his tribe a growing notoriety in the French colonial administration in Algeria after 1918.

== Militant path ==
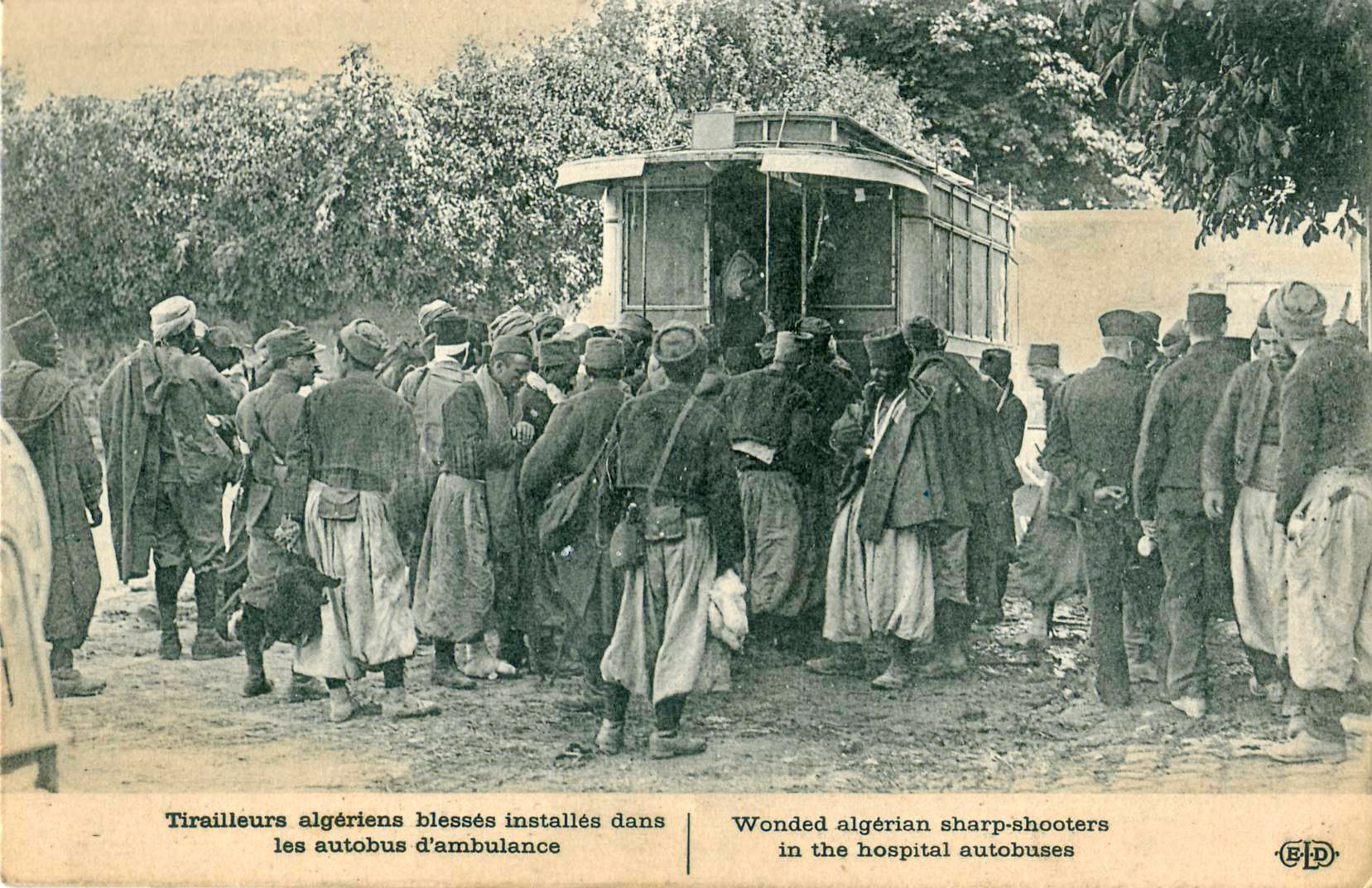
1st regiment of Algerian sharpshooters

Mohamed Seghir Boushaki began his militant career in politics as part of the French colonial administration from 1918 onwards.

Mohamed Seghir's political strategy was not to move to Algiers to reside there because comfortable transport was available by the railway line connecting Tizi Ouzou to Algiers which had been completed in 1888 after that linking Bouira to Algiers had previously been inaugurated in 1886.

Aged 49 at the end of the World War I with nearly ten children in his charge and responsibility, Mohamed Seghir could not venture to live in the Algiers microcosm by taking the risk of forgetting himself and dissolving in the details of the colonial city life far from the expectations of the Kabylian villagers perched on the heights of their mountains and contemplating the European settlers who robbed them of their arable land and their pastures.

The new privileged status of his nephew "Abderrahmane Boushaki" as a veteran allowed the "Arch of Aïth Aïcha" to rebuild the "Zawiya of Sidi Boushaki", destroyed in 1844 at the village of "Thala Oufella (Soumâa)", with a prayer room, a Coranic school, a basement with well, and a house for the Quran teacher. A French architect had designed the Zawiya of the village in a Berber-Moorish style.

The arrival of the rich baker "Mohamed Naïth Saïdi" from the region of Larbaâ Nath Irathen to settle in the colonial town of Ménerville (Thenia) was a decisive turning point in the area of "Aïth Aïcha", because he married a cousin of Mohamed Seghir Boushaki, And built an entire district in a Moorish style in the center of which a first mosque was built in Lower Kabylia after French colonization.

It followed the successive arrival of many Kabylian families from Djurdjura, such as "Redjouani" and "Djennadi", to settle among the European settlers in Ménerville (Thenia) and thus promote the emergence of a nationalist consciousness halfway between Tizi Ouzou and Algiers.

== Jonnart Law ==
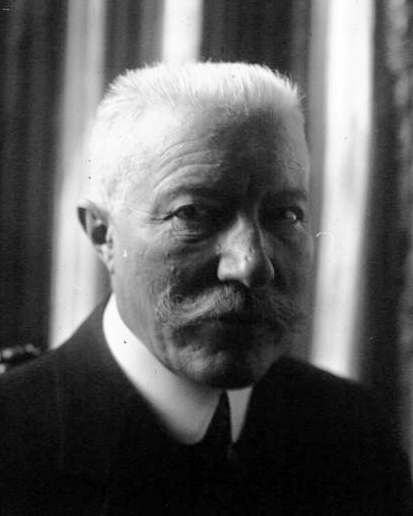
Charles Jonnart

The consecration of the process of reappropriation of public, institutional and social space in Kabylie by the original inhabitants found a legal breach through the Jonnart Law proclaimed on 4 February 1919 by Charles Jonnart and allowing the Algerians to elect and be elected to the municipal assemblies.

Thus, the first post-war municipal elections took place in Algeria on 30 November 1919, in which Mohamed Seghir Boushaki and Emir Khaled participated.

The struggle of Mohamed Seghir after 1919 revolves around the struggle in colonial legality, while remaining hostile to naturalization but also fighting for equality between native Algerians and French colonizers in a very difficult context.

The election of Mayor of Ménerville (Thenia) and his deputies took place on Sunday, 7 December 1919, in the elections of the Municipality where "César Boniface" as mayor, and his deputies "Auguste Schneider", "Georges Egrot" And "Samuel Juvin", were elected all with 23 votes out of a total of 24 voters.

Mohamed Seghir was elected as city councilor representing the Douar of "Thala Oufella (Soumâa)" in the Municipality of Ménerville within the "César Boniface" team for 5 years from 1920 to 1925.

Several other Algerian councilors sat at the Ménerville Town Hall next to Mohamed Seghir and represented their respective Douars surrounding the colonial city.

== Entryism ==
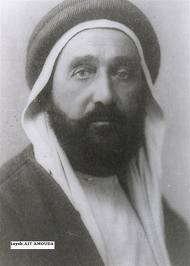
Emir Khaled

As early as 1920, Mohamed Seghir Boushaki with Emir Khaled integrated the political strategy of entrenchment into the administrative apparatus and the colonial cultural sphere, equipped with the elective immunity that enabled them to travel the Department of Algiers without hindrance to meet the nationalist elites of all edges.

This electoral entablature enabled Mohamed Seghir to benefit from several privileges of the position of municipal councilor such as obtaining a concession to operate a farmland of 70 hectares located south-east of the city of Merverville on the flank of the village "Thala Oufella (Soumâa)" and a short distance from Oued Isser.

The "Emir Khaled" took advantage of this entryism and infiltration to visit also the villages and villages of the Department of Algiers, as his grandfather the Emir Abdelkader also used to preach more rights to Algerians than those granted by the Jonnart Law.

An abundant political activity of Mohamed Seghir with the Emir Khaled continued until the exile of this last in 1923 by the colonial administration towards Egypt to try to temper the emancipatory impetus Algerian and Kabyle.

In 1924, Mohamed Seghir obtained a permit to open a "Moorish Café" in downtown Ménerville overlooking the bustling Avenue de la Republique, where his son M'Hamed Boushaki (1907–1995) went To work with his brothers until the outbreak of the Algerian independence revolution on 1 November 1954.

Little by little Mohamed Seghir became part of the colonial political game and began to position his cousins and relatives in administrative and service jobs in the "Canton of Alma (Boudouaou)" and in Algiers in order to reinforce the Kabyle presence in the capital of their despoiled ancestral land.

== Sufism ==
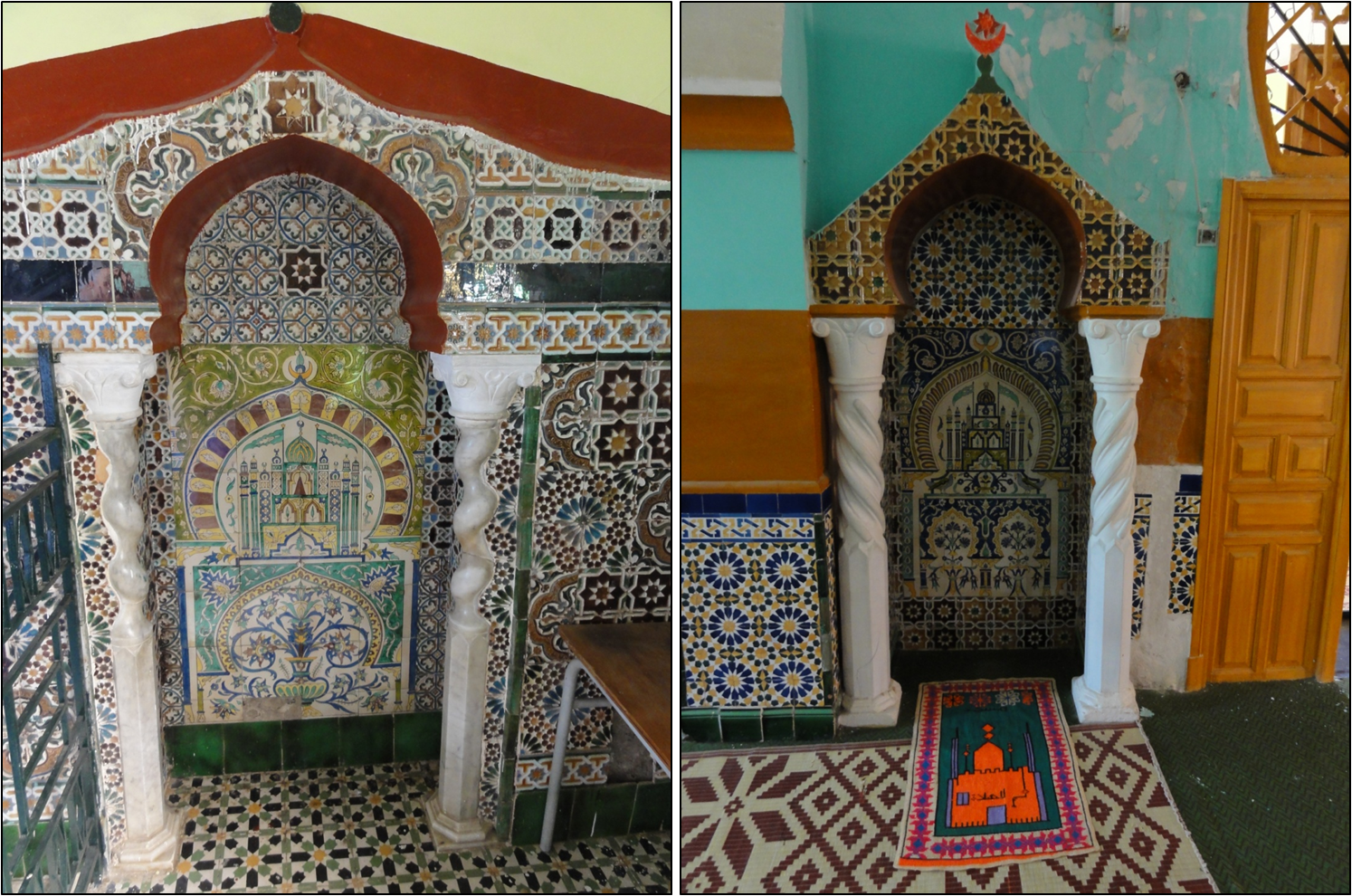
Bounouh Zaouiya

Mohamed Seghir Boushaki did not however break his spiritual and family ties with the followers of the Zawiyas Rahmaniyya of Tizi Ouzou who often visited him at his home in Ménerville, made a passage to his "Moorish Café" during their movements and sat as him in the 27th electoral circle of Tizi Ouzou like him in the 29th constituency of Alma (Boudouaou).

During the religious festivals, human foot convoys of Kabyle Sufis linked the villages of the "Aïth Aïcha" with those of the "Aïth Guechtoula" of Boghni with psalmodies, recitations and intonations all along the route of about 40 km.

The pilgrims and Kabyle disciples started from the Zawiyet Sidi Boushaki to reach the Bounouh Zaouiya in order to celebrate the Mawlid each year.

Mohamed Seghir then built a volunteer house of passengers at "Thala Oufella (Soumâa)" to welcome these Sufi disciples during their religious wanderings.

He had previously sent his son "M'Hamed Boushaki" as well as his other brothers to study in the "Boumerdassi Zawiya" south of Tidjelabine.

Meanwhile, his elder brother "Ali Boushaki" (1855–1965) had taken a theologian route to become one of the muftis of Lower Kabylie according to the Maliki rite and was named Mokaddem of the tarika Rahmaniyya in the region between The Mitidja and the Djurdjura, as well as his position as Imam of the preaching at the Mosque of Ménerville.

== Lobbying ==
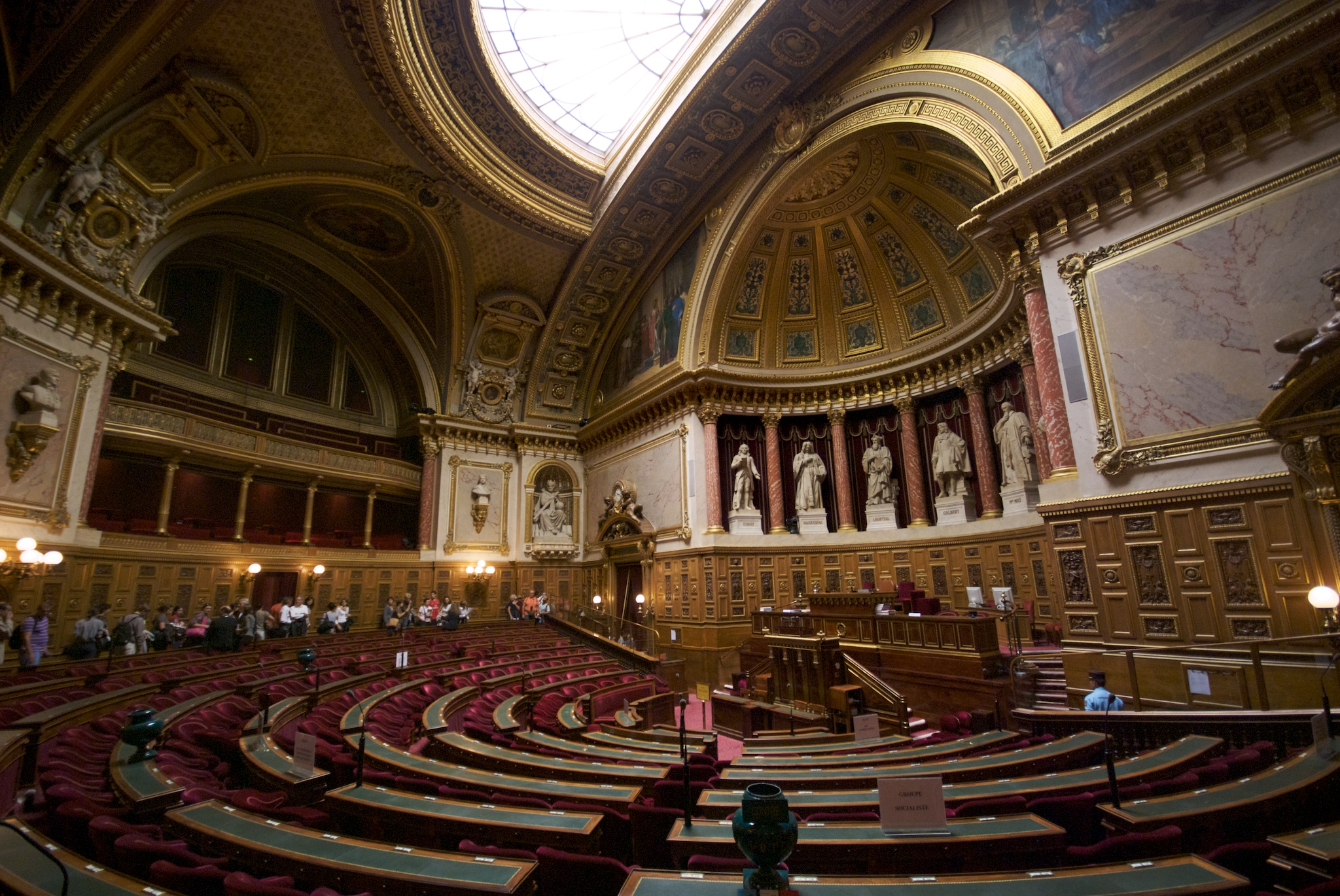
French Senate

Councilor Mohamed Seghir Boushaki excelled from 1920 to 1925 in political, social and religious lobbying during his first political mandate following the promulgation of the Jonnart Act.

Thus Mohamed Seghir mobilized the ardor of many Algerian councilors for the making and signing of "Petition No. 30" dated 18 July 1920, where he protested with several of his colleagues to the Senate against the provisions of a bill tabled in the Chamber by the French Government on the regulation of the Indigénat system in Algeria and the accession of Algerians of origin to political rights.

This "Petition No. 30" by Mohamed Seghir and his associates was examined by the Senator of the Landes of the time who was Charles Cadilhon as rapporteur of the senatorial session under the French Third Republic.

Mohamed Seghir had thoroughly studied the decision-making mechanisms of the resolutions of the Petitions Committees under Rule 100 of the Rules of Procedure of the French Senate which stipulated that any senator could ask for the report in public sitting of a petition whatever the classification which the commission has assigned to him at his request, addressed in writing to the President of the Senate, so that this report is presented in the sitting the Senate. After the expiry of the period prescribed for the processing of a petition, the resolutions of the Committee shall become final in respect of petitions which are not to be the subject of a public report and shall be referred to in the Journal officiel de la République française.

Thus "Petition No. 30" came into existence and was thoroughly discussed before being published in the Official Journal of 20 May 1921.

It was the "Senate of the Third Republic" which had debated this petition under the presidency of Léon Bourgeois.

== Office terms ==
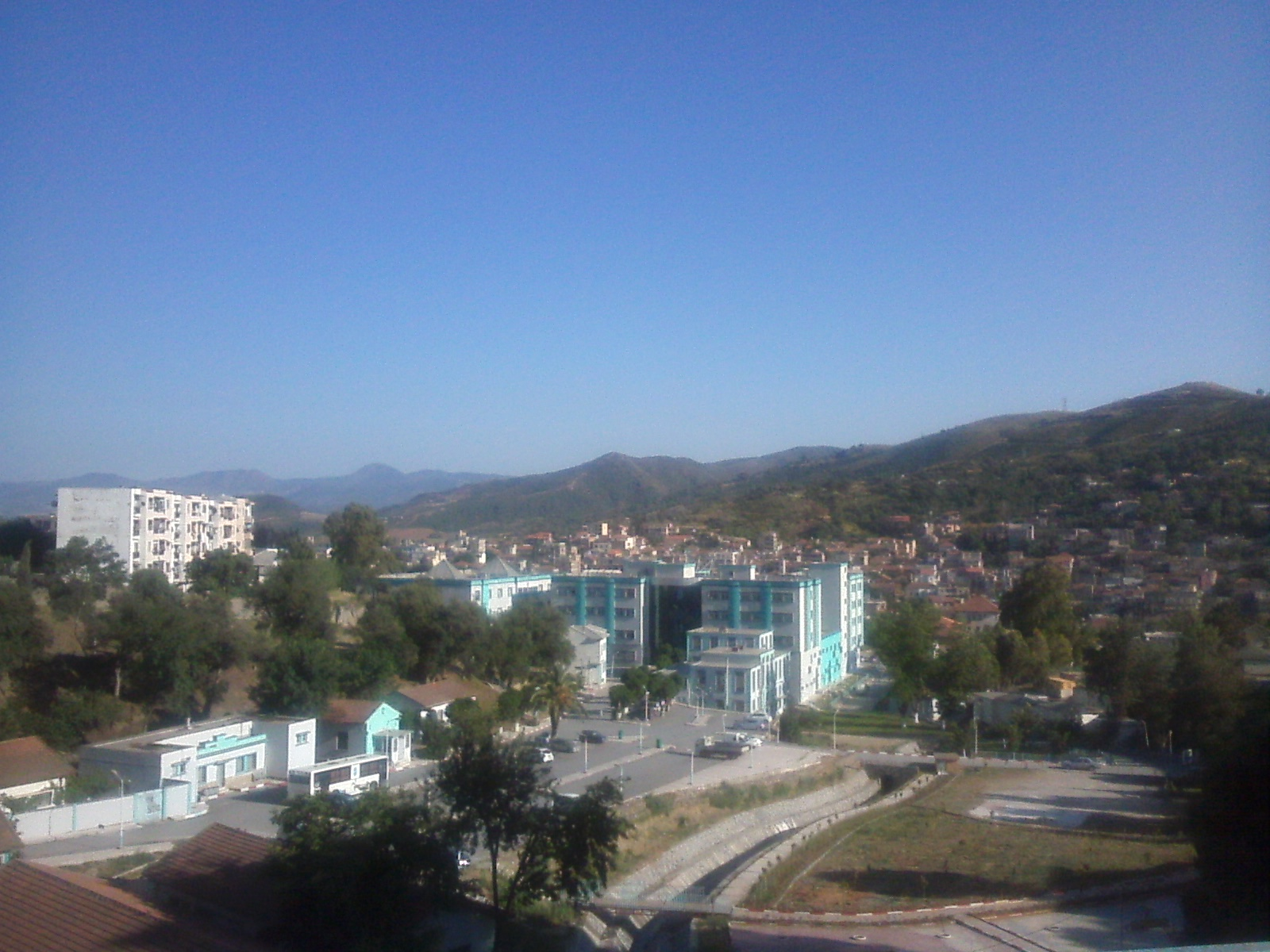
Thala Oufella (Soumâa) Mountain in Thenia

Office terms of Mohamed Seghir Boushaki
| N° | Office | Location | From | To | Governor of Algeria |
|---|---|---|---|---|---|
| 01 | City council of French Algeria | Thenia | 30 November 1919 | 3 May 1925 | Jean-Baptiste Abel; Théodore Steeg; Henri Dubief |
| 02 | City council of French Algeria | Thenia | 3 May 1925 | 1930 | Maurice Viollette; Pierre Bordes |
| 03 | City council of French Algeria | Thenia | 1935 | 1939 | Georges Le Beau |

== Bibliography ==
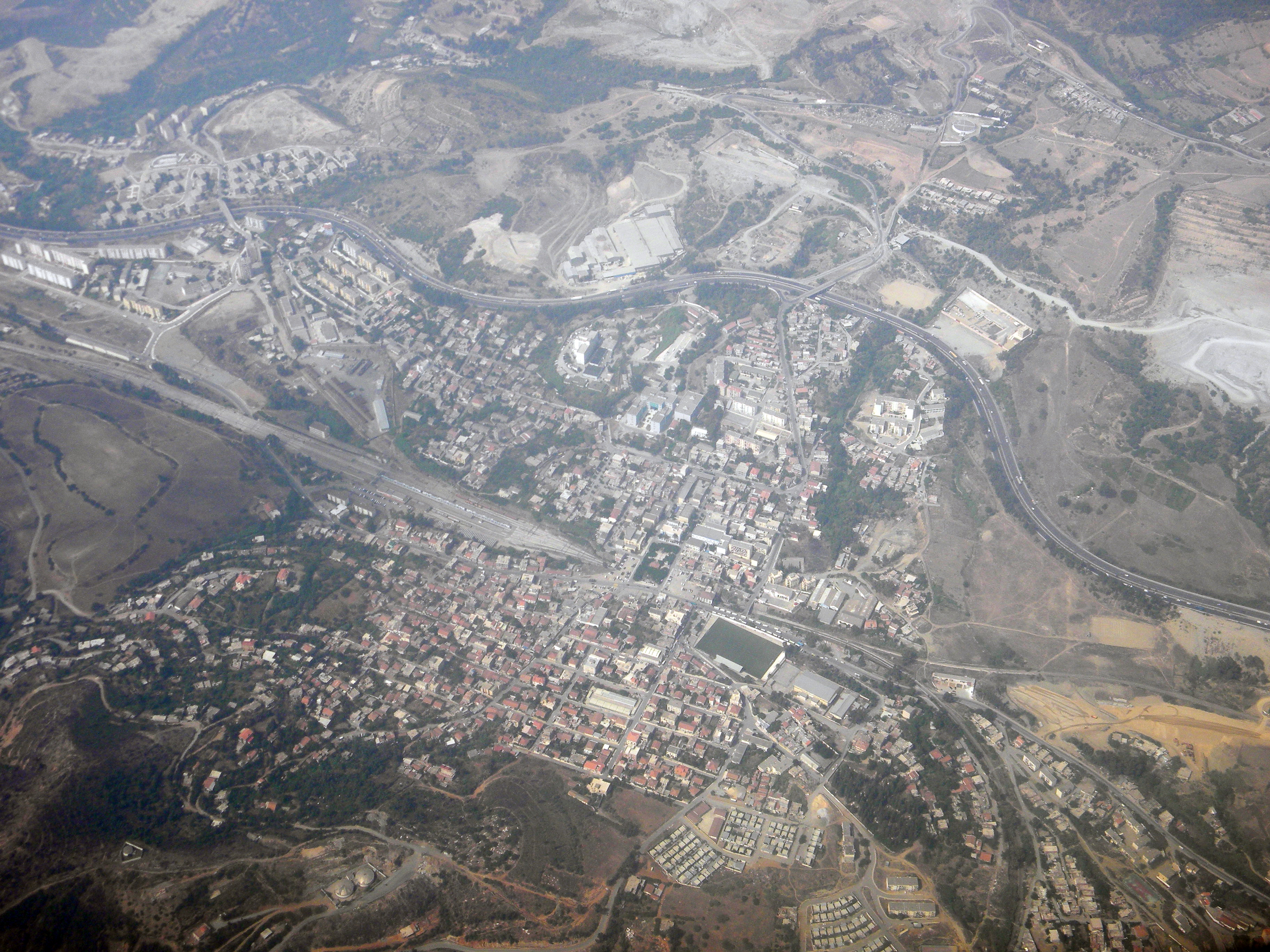
Mountain pass of Thenia city

- "Pétitions". Sénat: Séance du 18 juillet 1920 (in French). Vol. 73. Paris: Quai Voltaire. 20 May 1921. p. 1172. "Citation: p. 1170"
- Élections municipales 1925 (in French). Vol. 5689 (14ème Année ed.). Alger: Boulevard Carnot. 6 May 1925. p. 8. "Citation: p. 5"
- Élections municipales 1925 (in French). Vol. 5691 (14ème Année ed.). Alger: Boulevard Carnot. 8 May 1925. p. 8. "Citation: p. 5"
- Mandat municipal (in French). Vol. 6516 (16ème Année ed.). Alger: Boulevard Carnot. 12 August 1927. p. 4. "Citation: p. 2"
- Élections municipales 1935 (in French). Vol. 9059 (24ème Année ed.). Alger: Boulevard Carnot. 25 May 1935. p. 8. "Citation: p. 6"

== See also ==
- List of Algerians
- History of Algeria
- Zawiyet Sidi Boumerdassi
- Algerian nationalism
- Algerian National Movement
- 1948 Algerian Assembly election
- French Third Republic
- French Fourth Republic
- French Fifth Republic
