= Menerville =

Menerville or Ménerville may refer to:

- Ménerville, a French village.
- Ménerville, an old name of Thenia town in Algeria.
