= Gommecourt =

Gommecourt is the name of two communes in France:

- Gommecourt, Pas-de-Calais
- Gommecourt, Yvelines
