= Zaouïa de Bounouh =

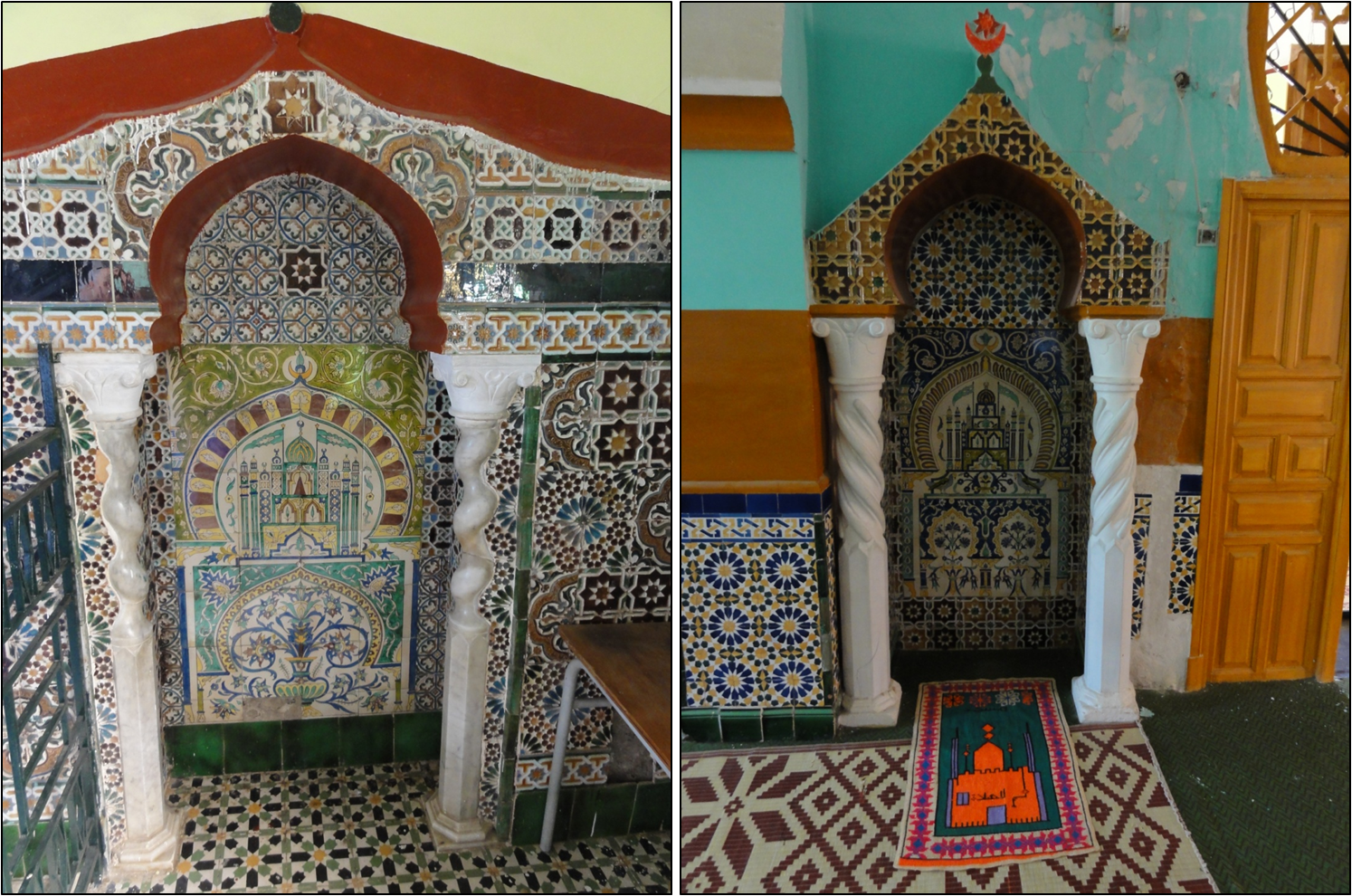
- Zaouïa of Bounouh

Location
- Bounouh, Daïra de Boghni, Algeria; Tizi Ouzou Province, 15005; Algeria
- Coordinates: 36.4935°N 3.9425°E

Information
- Type: Zaouïa, Sufi, Sunni, Maliki
- Motto: Zaouïa of Sidi M'hamed Bou Qobrine
- Established: 1768
- Founder: Sidi M'hamed Bou Qobrine
- Authority: Ministry of Religious Affairs and Wakfs; Algerian Religious Reference; Zaouïas in Algeria
- Language: Arabic, Tamazight
- Affiliation: Rahmaniya - Tharahmanith
- Website: marw.dz

The Zaouïa of Bounouh or Zaouïa of Sidi M'hamed Bou Qobrine is a religious building located in Bounouh, Tizi Ouzou Province, Algeria, honoring the memory of the patron saint of the region, Sidi M'hamed Bou Qobrine, also known as Sidi M'hamed ben Abderahmane al-Azhari. It is part of the Zawiyas in Algeria, affiliated with the Rahmaniyya brotherhood under the authority of the Ministry of Religious Affairs and Endowments and the Algerian Religious Reference.

== History ==
After thirty years of absence from Kabylie, the theologian Sidi M'hamed Bou Qobrine returned home in 1768. He first settled in his village of Aït-Smail in Bounouh, where he founded the Zaouïa of Bounouh. He later decided to settle in Algiers to found the Zaouïa of Sidi M'hamed. He chose to settle in what would later become the Hamma neighborhood.

This Zaouïa of Sidi M'hamed, welcoming the poor, orphans, and strangers, is also a university where many sciences are taught. It became the preferred place for Khalwa for those seeking initiation.

The sheikh had as disciples Sidi Abderrahmane Bacha tarzi El Qosantini, who spread the tariqa in Constantine and throughout the east of the country, Sidi Ibn Azzouz El Bordji, Sidi Ameziane El Haddad, spiritual leader of the Mokrani revolt, Sidi Ahmed Tidjani, founder of the Tidjaniya tariqa, and many others.

His Khalwatiya Tariqa became the Rahmaniya (which would give its name to the Lalla Rahmaniya Zaouïa), in reference to Abderrahmane, the name of his father.

Thus, Sidi M’Hamed introduced the Khalwatiya path in Algeria. He taught for about 25 years, until the day he felt his health decline, and he decided to return to his hometown. He died there in 1793, at the age of 73.

== Facilities ==
The Zaouïa of Sidi M'hamed Bou Qobrine currently houses several facilities:

1. A mosque.
2. Classrooms.
3. Dormitories for the Hafiz.
4. Official residences.
5. A library.
6. Several offices.
7. A canteen.
8. Several rooms for visitor residence.
9. Mausoleum of Sidi M'hamed Bou Qobrine.

== Chouyoukhs of the Zaouïa ==
Chouyoukhs of the Zaouïa of Bounouh
| No. | Sheikh | Start | End |
|---|---|---|---|
| 1 | Sidi M'hamed Bou Qobrine | 1770 | 1794 |
| 2 | Sidi Ali Ben Aïssa | 1794 | 1823 |

== Notable people ==
- Cheikh El Haddad
- Mehdi Seklaoui

== Sources ==
- Bourouiba, Rachid. Les Inscriptions commémoratives des mosquées d’Algérie. Alger: Office des Publications Universitaires, 1984. pp. 81–86.
- Bourouiba, Rachid. L’Art religieux musulman en Algérie. Alger: S.N.E.D., 1983.
- Bourouiba, Rachid. Apports de l’Algérie à l’architecture religieuse arabo-islamique. Alger: OPNA, 1986.
- Devoulx, Albert. Les Édifices religieux de l'ancien Alger. Alger: Bastide, 1870. (Excerpt from the Revue africaine.)
- Marçais, Georges. L’Architecture musulmane d’occident, Tunisie, Algérie, Espagne et Sicile. Paris: Arts et Métiers Graphiques, 1954.
