= Mustapha Sahnoune =

Algerian songwriter (born 1937)

- Born: January 27, 1937 (age 88); Algeria
- Occupation(s): Composer, musician, conductor

Mustapha Sahnoune (born January 27, 1937) is an Algerian songwriter.

Long before the outbreak of the Algerian War, Mustapha Sahnoune created at the end of the 40s, an ensemble with his friends, he called, La Rose blanche.

In 1958, the political leadership of the revolution based in Tunis decided to create two artistic and athletic troops that will be the spokesman of a people fighting for its liberation. A great appeal is launched, following this decision, from Radio Tunis, "Sawt El Djazaïr" for all Algerians who are in the country or abroad to join the FLN in Tunis.

This band presented songs of different themes, much more popular, until 1954 when all cultural activity is prohibited. Just after the strike of eight days of January 28, 1957, these artists which were forbidden to perform in their country regain Tunisia, and others among them, joined the maquis. Sahnoune is arrested as other compatriots and is tortured by French colonial police, on this date in 1957. From the prison, Algerian artists revolt on their side and denounce their cry, the atrocities of colonial France, from a cell where the first militant who protest against the word "fellagha", given by the colonial army, to the Mujahideen, was the poet Moufdi Zakaria.

After being released, Mustapha Sahnoune left for Paris in January 1958, long before the artistic troop of the FLN was created. He was recruited at ORTF by the activist and singer Farid Ali, who was head of department within the institution. Farid helped many artists to record songs in this institution to have a laissez-passer.

The ORTF allowed artists to arrange many contacts for the organization of the artistic troop of the FLN. In March 1958 he went to Tunis and joined the ensemble at the villa Bardo (the party base) to form the artistic alliance in April of the same year. Sahnoune was in the orchestra, as an accordionist, next to Ahmed Wahbi on oud, singers, Hsissen, the author of Ya Tir El Kafs and Saïd Saïh, the instrumentalist Ben Ahmed, violinist Mensour Boualem, Alilou on the darbuka, musician, actor and dancer, Hamou Sadaoui (Salah Sadaoui's brother) the young singer El Hadi Radjeb and the visionary Djaâfar Bek among others. Kalbi ya Bladi la nensek was the first patriotic song Mustapha Sahnoune composed. This song was performed by El Hadi Radjeb at the age of 13, and was written by the poet Mustapha Toumi, who wrote the famous Sbhan Allah ya Ltif for El Hadj El Anka. The second song is Ya oumi ma tkhafich, written and sung by Bouzidi Mohamed and El Hadi Radjeb too. Mustapha Sahnoune composed for other activist artists such as Said Saih who sings, L Petrol and Djaâfar Bek,Ya De Gaulle.

A Yema azizen, Bladi Ya Kalbi, Djazaïrana, Qacamen and more than fifty other works in the repertoire of the troupe were recorded, during its tour in Yugoslavia, broadcast on Belgrade's radio, and by Aissa Messaoudi on his show Sawt El Djazaïr (the Voice of Algeria) on Tunis' radio at the end of 1958.

I wish one day that Algeria retrieves all the patriotic songs that were released at that time, in the fraternal countries, neighbors and friends. These are records that should be preserved for future generations. There is so much to think about the means for maintaining the tangible and intangible cultural heritage of the country. Algeria's works are scattered. We are a few to recall today, revolutionaries texts and others. Each activist of the FLN artistic troupe that leaves takes a share of the treasure with him. Authorities must subsidize this sector through appropriate scientific and cultural resources

— Mustapha Sahnoune, La Dépèche de Kabylie

Alongside patriotic compositions, realized, mainly for El Hadi Radjeb and Said Saih, Sahnoune, worked with Tahar Ben Ahmed writing texts of popular châabi songs. He composed for the Tunisians, Mustapha Kamel and Raouf Charfi and for the first female Tunisian singer Oulaya interpreting, El Hayou Djazaïr and Ya Djazaïr y a Djamhourïa, during the Algerian Provisional Government.

In 1960 he went to Egypt to work for a year at the Conservatory of Cairo, "Sawt El Aarab", where he composed a melody for Mohamed Kandil: Ana Ibn El Djazaïr.

From 1962 to 1972, he wrote to a host of young people such as Mohamed Rushdi, El Ghazi, Faïza El Djazaïria, Ahmed Choukri, Sami El Djazaïri and many others.
