= Dannemarie =

Dannemarie is the name or part of the name of several communes in France:

- Dannemarie, Doubs, in the Doubs department
- Dannemarie, Haut-Rhin, in the Haut-Rhin department
- Dannemarie, Yvelines, in the Yvelines department
- Dannemarie-sur-Crète, in the Doubs department
