= 1919 Algerian municipal elections =

Local elections in Algeria

Municipal elections were held in French Algeria in November 1919 to elect municipal councils in cities.

== Electoral Body ==
The electoral body of the Algerian natives was charged in these elections with designating the Muslim municipal councilors in the 281 communes of full exercise in Algeria.

The results of this elective representation of Muslims in the municipal councils was to increase from a quarter to a third of the total membership of the councils and the total number of their municipal councilors was thus increased by around 65%, from 390 to 1,540.

== Notable councilors ==
- Khalid ibn Hashim (1875–1936)
- Mohamed Seghir Boushaki (1869–1959)
