= Farid Ali (singer) =

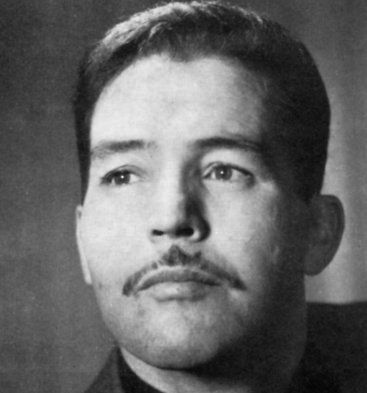

Background information
- Born: Khelifi Ali; January 9, 1919; Bounouh, French Algeria
- Died: October 19, 1981 (aged 62) Boghni, Algeria
- Occupations: Composer, musician (Arabic, Kabyle, French)

Farid Ali (Kabyle: Ferid Ɛli; January 9, 1919 – October 19, 1981) was an Algerian singer.

== Early life ==
Farid Ali (born Khelifi Ali) was born in Ikhelfounen in the commune of Bounouh. In 1935, he left his native village to settle in Algiers, where he served as a shoemaker and was soon to leave overseas.

== Biography ==
After a few years, he returned to the fold where he received his revolutionary friends, including Colonel Krim Belkacem. Arrested in 1956 by the colonial army, for his revolutionary activities, Farid Ali suffered the worst tortures throughout his detention. Farid was also part of the OS during the Algerian War and after his liberation in 1957 he joined the FLN art troupe that played a part in raising international awareness about the Algerian revolution, traveling in several countries, including Tunisia and China. Encouraged by the various conductors of the moment: Mohamed El Kamal, Mohamed Jamoussi and later Amraoui Missoum, Farid dedicated himself to music since the late '40s. He sang the evocative Ayemma sver ur tsru (literally translated: mum, be patient and don't cry) written by Mustapha Sahnoun and several other militant songs including Afus deg-gwfus (hand in hand) and Abrid ik-yerwan awi-t (take the path you want). After independence, he was a great sympathiser of the Berber Academy in Paris which became active in the recognition of the Berber language. He remained detained in Berrouaghia after a political crisis until 1965. He was then pardoned by Houari Boumediene with other political prisoners. After having opened and operated a café in Algiers, he went back to France in 1966. In Paris he sympathize with the founding members of the Berber Academy, Mohammed Arav Bessaoud, Taos Amrouche and Mohand Saïd Hanouz among others. He also helped after independence several singers to emerge from anonymity, through the radio show "chanteurs amateurs" that he animated on Alger Chaîne 2. It was not until July 5, 1987, that he was awarded a distinction by Chadli Bendjedid.

Farid Ali was so forgotten that his son received in 1996 (15.50 da) fifteen dinars and fifty cents of copyright on the dissemination of his songs by Radio stations.

== Bibliography ==
- Mahfoufi, Mehenna (2002) [2002]. Chants kabyles de la Guerre d'Indépendance. Algérie 1954–1962 (in French). Paris: Atlantica-Séguier. p. 300.
