= Gommecourt, Yvelines =

Gommecourt
- Commune
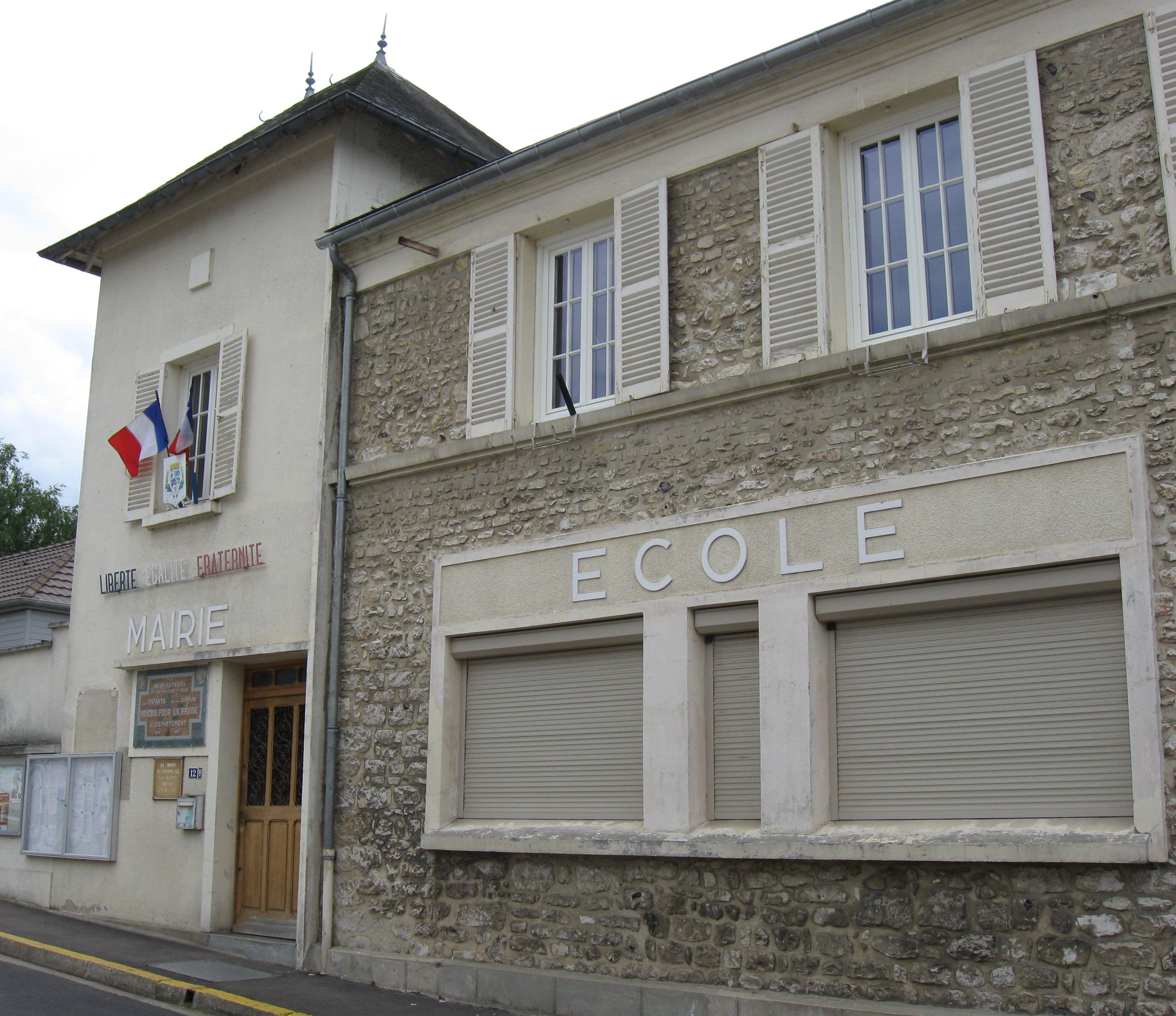
- The town hall and school in Gommecourt

- Coat of arms
- Location of Gommecourt
- Location within France Location within Île-de-France (region)
- Coordinates: 49°04′38″N 1°35′36″E
- Country: France
- Region: Île-de-France
- Department: Yvelines
- Arrondissement: Mantes-la-Jolie
- Canton: Bonnières-sur-Seine
- Intercommunality: Portes de l'Île-de-France

Government
  - Mayor (2020–2026): Gérard Solaro
- Area^{1}: 5.67 km^{2} (2.19 sq mi)
- Elevation: 120 m (390 ft)
- Highest elevation: 123 m (404 ft)
- Lowest elevation: 14 m (46 ft)
- Population (2023): 613
  - Density: 108/km^{2} (280/sq mi)
- Time zone: UTC+01:00 (CET)
  - Summer (DST): UTC+02:00 (CEST)
- INSEE/Postal code: 78276 /78270
- ^{1} French Land Register data, which excludes lakes, ponds, glaciers > 1 km^{2} (0.386 sq mi or 247 acres) and river estuaries.

Gommecourt (French pronunciation: [ɡɔmkuʁ]) is a commune in the Yvelines department in the Île-de-France region in north-central France.

== See also ==
- Communes of the Yvelines department
