= Jonnart Law =

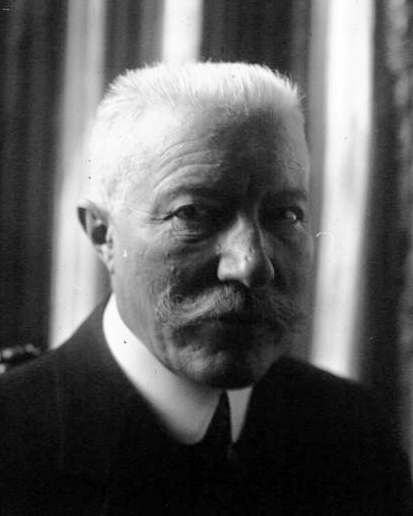
Governor General Charles Jonnart.

The Jonnart Law was the culmination of Governor General Charles Jonnart's reform program for French Algeria, passed on 4 February 1919. Although it increased the number of Algerian Muslims eligible to vote for the Muslim members of municipal councils to approximately 425,000, and gave approximately 100,000 the right to vote for members of the departmental councils and the Financial Delegations, it was greatly watered down from the original proposals of 1917. Proposals such as the creation of a joint European and Muslim council in Paris were abandoned entirely. The law was controversial, with colons (European immigrants) believing that too much had been given to the Algerians and the Algerians largely believing it to be insufficient recognition from a country for which they had fought and died during the First World War.

== See also ==
- Indigénat
- 1919 Algerian municipal elections
- 1920 Algerian Political Rights Petition
