= Bounouh =

Bounouh Ath Smail Bou-Nouh
- Commune and town
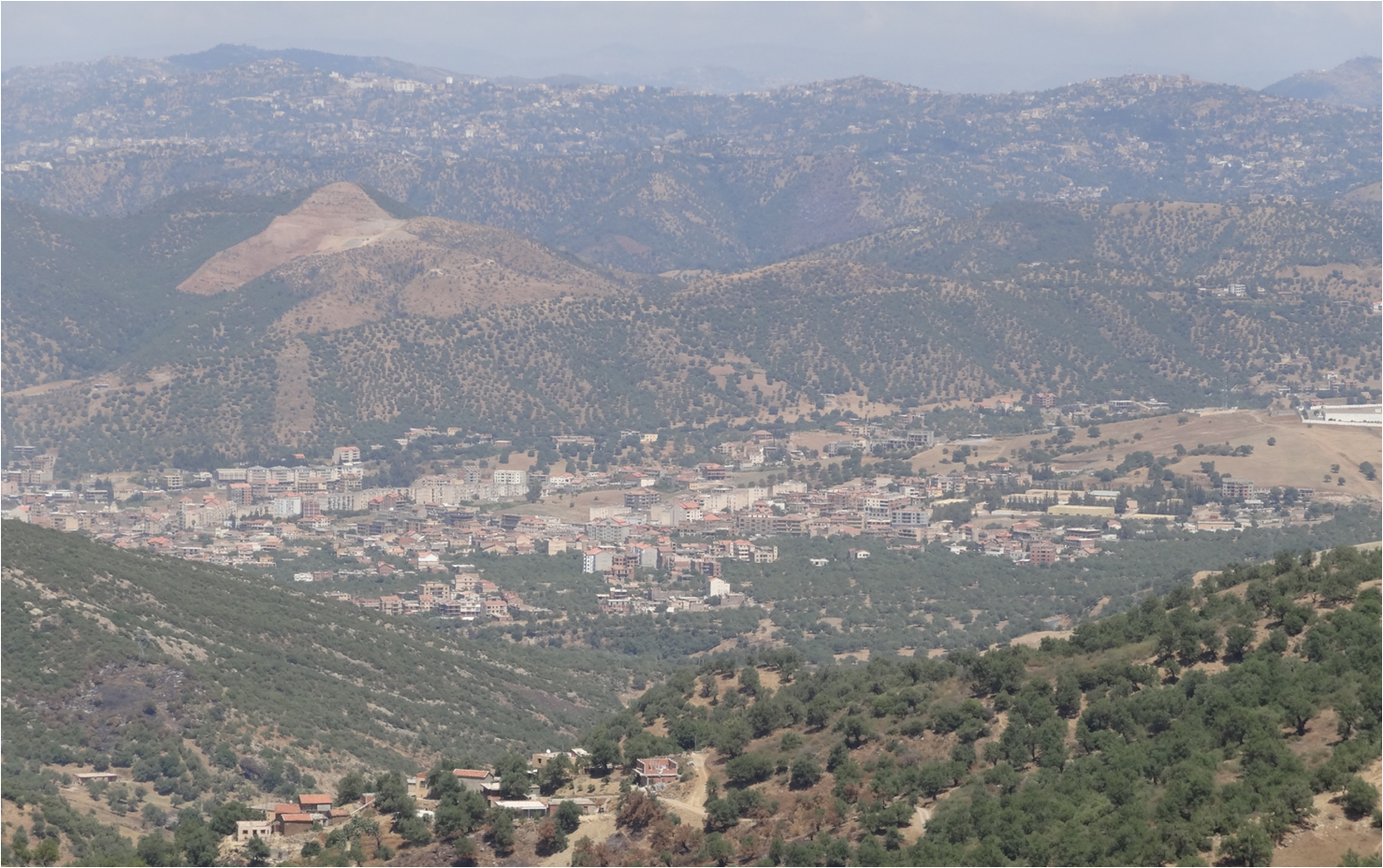

- Location within Algeria
- Country: Algeria
- Province: Tizi Ouzou
- District: Boghni

Area
  - Total: 26.99 km^{2} (10.42 sq mi)

Population (2008)
  - Total: 9,731
  - Density: 361/km^{2} (930/sq mi)
- Time zone: UTC+1 (CET)
- Postcode: 15445
- Area code: 020

Bou-Nouh is a town and commune in Tizi Ouzou Province in northern Algeria.

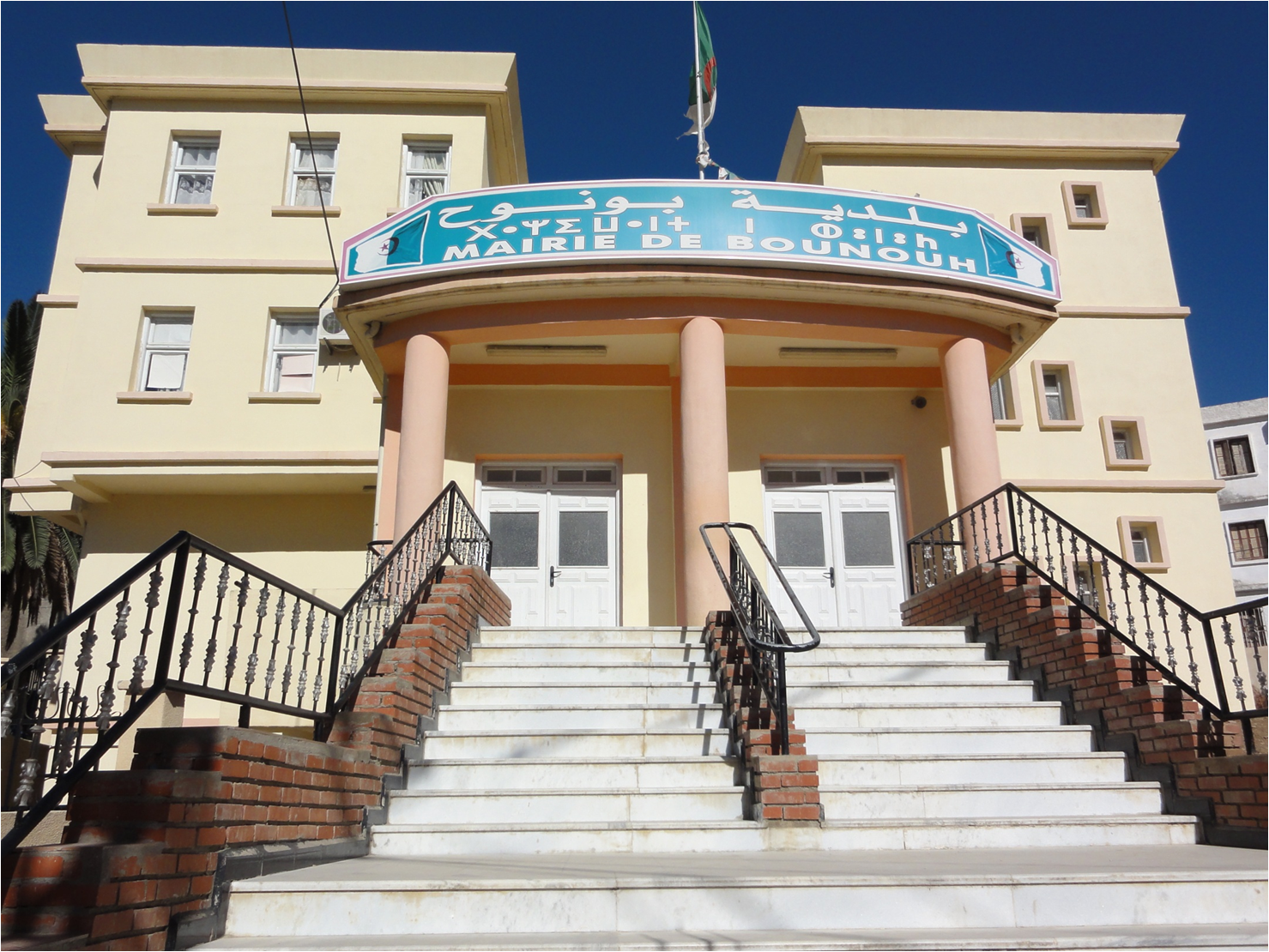
Bounouh new Town Hall

== Geography ==
Bounouh is the head commune within the Arch of Ath Smaïl which is located next to the Djurdjura National Park. Its GPS coordinates are 36.49935,3.936558. In truth, Bounouh is the name of a town and, mistakenly, its name has been given a meaning to represent the whole Arch of Ath Smaïl. This Ath Smaïl should not be mistaken for a namesake in the Wilaya of Bejaïa. The Arch of Ath Smaïl is located to the south west of the Wilaya of Tizi-Ouzou and is in close proximity to the Daïras of Boghni (driving distance from Bounouh is about 10.9 km through Thala Oulili and Amezaourou and under 9.6 km through Ighil Aanane and Amezaourou) and Draâ-El Mizan (driving distance from Bounouh is approximately 13 km) whereas the bird's flight distance from Bou-Nouh to Boghni is merely 5 km and this is testimony of the hilly landscape. Boghni to Draâ El Mizan driving distance is 15.4 km. It has become fashionable to change the spelling of Bou-Nouh to Bounouh! There is also Ait Bounouh in Tiznit, Morocco.

Ait Smaïl is a mountainous region, offering many landscapes with panoramic views for visitors. Thala Oulili is 400m above sea level whilst Helouane is at an altitude of more than 1200m. There is a namesake Helouane within the Wilaya of Bejaïa. The Arch of Ath Smaïl has an area of 26.99 km2 with 80% in rural setting. The population is 9,731 inhabitants distributed over 23 villages.

Ath Smaïl is bordered by Boghni to the north, the villages of Ath Mendes and Ath Kouffi (District of Boghni) to the east, The Djurdjura Mountains, Ait Laaziz and Taghzout (Province of Bouira) to the south and finally Frikat and Ain Zaouïa on its western flank. As is customary throughout Kabylia, villages in Bounouh are often perched on hills so as to defend themselves against any invasion. Recently, people from Tizi L Had, Ibouhatène, Chebaba, and other villages have started to settle in the plains of Lemhella where the number of houses has kept increasing annually.

Driving from Boghni (36.542369,3.953723), heading to Ath Smaïl, and following the road of Ath Mendes and then the road of Frikat, one passes the following places: Thala Oulili (36.516231,3.947715), Taghza (36.517693,3.933147), Lemhella (36.517226,3.929172), Tizi N Chreat (36.517764,3.921472), Thiwririne (36.522644,3.914477), Ichemounene (36.515039,3.918961), Lemqessa (36.513539,3.923296), Tizi L Had (36.511828,3.928797), Chebaba (36.508725,3.929585), Issidikene and Ibouhatène (36.506845,3.928576). Just after Tizi L Had and before Ibouhatène, one can turn right towards Bouzoula (36.50655,3.926935), Ath Si-Ali (36.50602,3.926061), Zaarour (36.469446,3.930506), Ath Telha, Tizi Medene and Helouane (36.489414,3.921999). However, if after Tizi L Had and continuing straight, one passes by Ibouhatène, Bou-Nouh, L’Merdja (36.498005,3.943554), Axxam N Cheikh (Sidi Abderrahmane, 36.493484,3.942578), Baâli (36.492468,3.939777), Ikaananene (36.489598,3.933982), Ath Telha, and then finishing in Helouane. From L’Merdja, one can visit Amalou (36.496125,3.944991) and Awrir (36.502363,3.941618). From Bou-Nouh, one can return towards Taghza following the road of Ath Smaïl-Boghni and passing by Ikhalfounene (36.50155,3.935797), Amezaourou (36.511493,3.944541), Alma B-Uli (36.514571,3.935335), Lejnan N Cheikh (36.515942,3.936376), and Taghza. From Taghza, one could drive back to Boghni following the road of Ath Smaïl-Boghni also known as Ighil Aanane (36.522925,3.941939) and pass at close proximity to the forest of Tazrouts (36.522822,3.944128) and finish at the higher secondary school (Lycée) Zamoum Mohamed of Boghni.

== History ==
During French occupation of Algeria, Bou-Nouh was a commune within the District of Draâ-El Mizan and ahead of the now Daïra of Boghni. Ath Smaïl entered history at the beginning of the 16th century. The Turks (Ottoman Empire) set up a Bordj, a few hundred metres from the Lycée Zamoum (close proximity to family Terkmani) in Boghni to collect taxes. This was attacked and subsequently destroyed on 16 July 1756 by Iflissen and Ath Smaïl, and consequently the Turks left the garrison. However, nothing is said or mentioned about the megalithic structures in Tissamamine. Tissamamine is known locally as the shortcut to walk from Bou-Nouh towards Chebaba. Back in the 1970s, it was littered with large, T-shaped structures. Their significance is not clear and not documented. Nowadays, only the large and bulky axial rocks lie on the ground as the flat stones have been broken down and used in the construction of private houses. There was, however, one remaining structure on the grounds of Cheikh Ben Abderrahmane until 2011 when this one also mysteriously disappeared without a trace, its fate unbeknown to the locals. Even the ground around its placement was completely reshaped to wipe out any trace of existence. Visitors to the mosque could lean at its entrance and call their beloved ones to come back, especially immigrants. It was told that outcomes were excellent.

According to religious records, the Catholic Church was set up in Bou-Nouh in 1876 and soon after the boys and girls schools (in Bou-Nouh) were founded in 1877 and 1892, respectively. It is not clear from the records as to when Bou-Nouh benefited from a health clinic. The Catholic Church held a conference in 1937 in the commune and this denotes the importance and prestige of Bou-Nouh. However, long before the French set foot in Algeria, one could not forget the illustrious Cheikh Sidi M'hamed Ben Abderrahmane who had set up his own illuminating Tariqa Rahmani in Ait Smaïl in 1769! The Rahmania, which preached a form of passive religious belief, was to play a role in Algerian insurrection against the French. Inside the mosque there is a poster summarizing the spiritual and combative sides of Cheikh Ben Abderrahmane. Even after his death, his mosque continued to play a massive role in all uprisings and this led to several closures as a form of punishment. Cheikh Mohand Ameziane Aheddad, from Seddouk Oufela (Bejaïa), a fervent preacher of the Rahmania which he studied in Ath Irathen and Ath Smaïl, allied himself along El Mokrani in 1871 to lead a rebellion against the French invasion. After his capture, Cheikh Aheddad died on 29 April 1873 at the prison of El Koudiat (Constantine) at the age of 83 and he was initially buried in Constantine against his known wish and then later exhumed and reburied in Seddouk to fulfil his request to be buried in his beloved home town. After the conquest of Kabylie in 1871, the French embarked on founding a number of towns between Draâ-El Mizan and Larbaâ N Ath Irathen (ex Fort Napoléon and Fort National), such as Draâ-El Mizan (1873), Beauprètre (1874), Pirette (now Ain Zaouia) (1875), Tizi-Gheniff (1875) and Boghni (1876). From Larbaâ Nath Irathen to Béjaïa were created Fréha (1882), Azazga (1882) and Yakouren (1888). Then the French adopted, using a number of measures between 1871 and 1878, the American Homestead rule to confiscate and give land free to French Colons and their number swelled to 207,615 on 1 January 1888! This led to the beginning of the erosion of the socio-economic structure which supported Kabylie and to a larger extent Algeria. Although, it could be argued that land productivity increased, the (agricultural) food exports from Algeria to France soared from 9.7 to in excess of 125million French Francs for only the ports of Algiers, Annaba, and Oran over the period of 1838–40 to 1885–87.

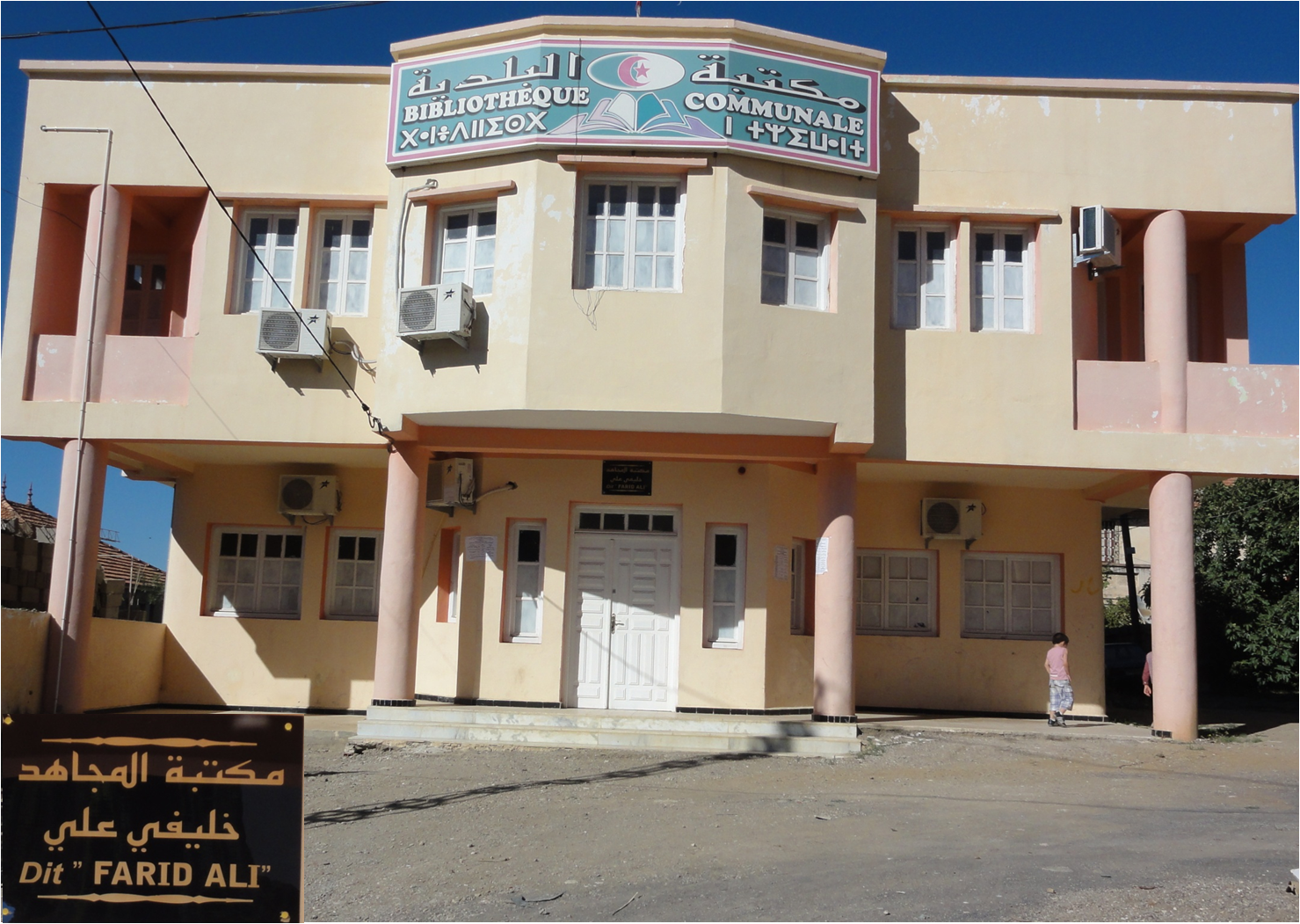
Library Farid Ali

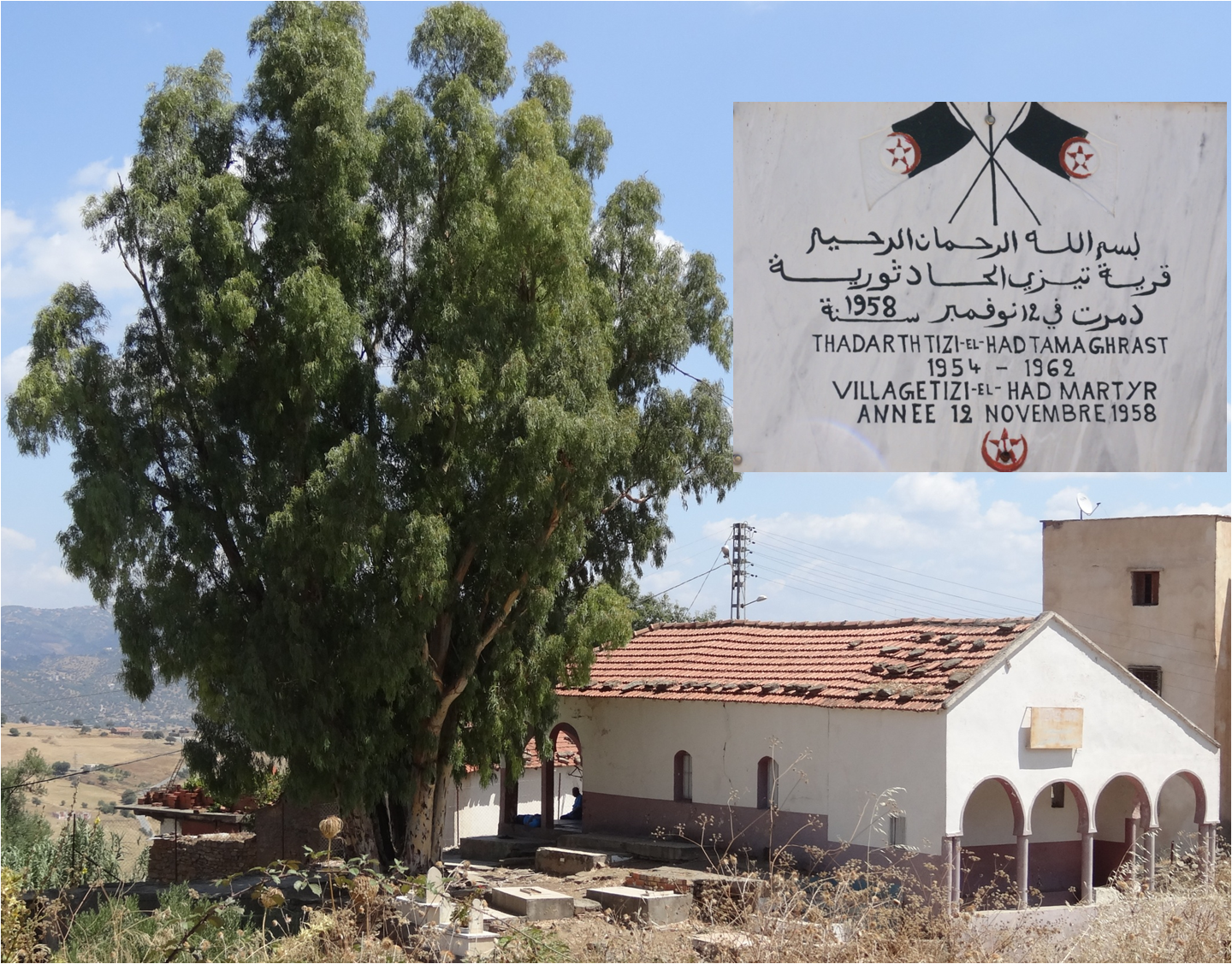
Tizi L Had, destroyed by the French in November 1958 but the mosque and eucalyptus tree survived the relentless bombing

The indomitable Ath Smaïl, who rose against the Turks and French colonisation, played its crucial part in the Algerian war for independence which started in 1954 and lasted until 1962. Many regional leaders originated from Ath Smaïl and several people lost their lives or have been imprisoned. Tizi L Had was turned to rubble by the French canons in November 1958 and, as by miracle, only the mosque stood unshaken. Both Bou-Nouh and Boghni honoured a number of the heroes by naming streets and schools after them. The widows from Ath Smaïl often evoke a number of poems to recount the horrors of the war and their sufferings. Students at the University Mouloud Mammeri of Tizi-Ouzou originating from the Arch of Ath Smaïl took part in the foundation of the Comité Anti-Repression in 1980 and played an active role in the movement that fashioned the Berber Spring which led to the recognition of the Berber language and culture, threatened with certain extinction.

After independence, the strong but not so rich Bounouh lost its status of commune and the ever-developing Boghni was promoted in its place. At Ath Smaïl, all roads pass by the side of the villages, because the villages came to exist first and the road network followed much later on. At Ath Smaïl, even walking paths had names such as Adjroud, Lburath, Tissamamine, Tassawent L Had, etc. Even small patches of land carried names which are beyond comprehension such as Alma Bwuli (literally land of sheep), Lemhella, Taghza, Tabaquit Irumiyen (literally the French or Roman table), Lemqessa, etc. This demonstrates the historical heritage of Ath Smaïl. In Boghni, however, the road network came to exist first as part of the link between Draâ-El Mizan and Larbaâ Nath Irathen (ex- Fort Napoléon and Fort National) and then people moved in afterwards. Based on knowledge from the early 1970s, a large number of the first inhabitants or the people to set up business in Boghni originated mostly from Ath Smaïl. There was only a tiny influx from neighbouring Mechtras and Ouadhias which were already benefiting from good infrastructure in terms of land, roads and water. The Catholics established a College of Further Education (Centre de Formation Professionnelle) in Boghni where the first 20 technicians to be employed by Sonatrach when it opened the Arzew oil refinery (near Oran) were formed included pupils from Ath Smail.

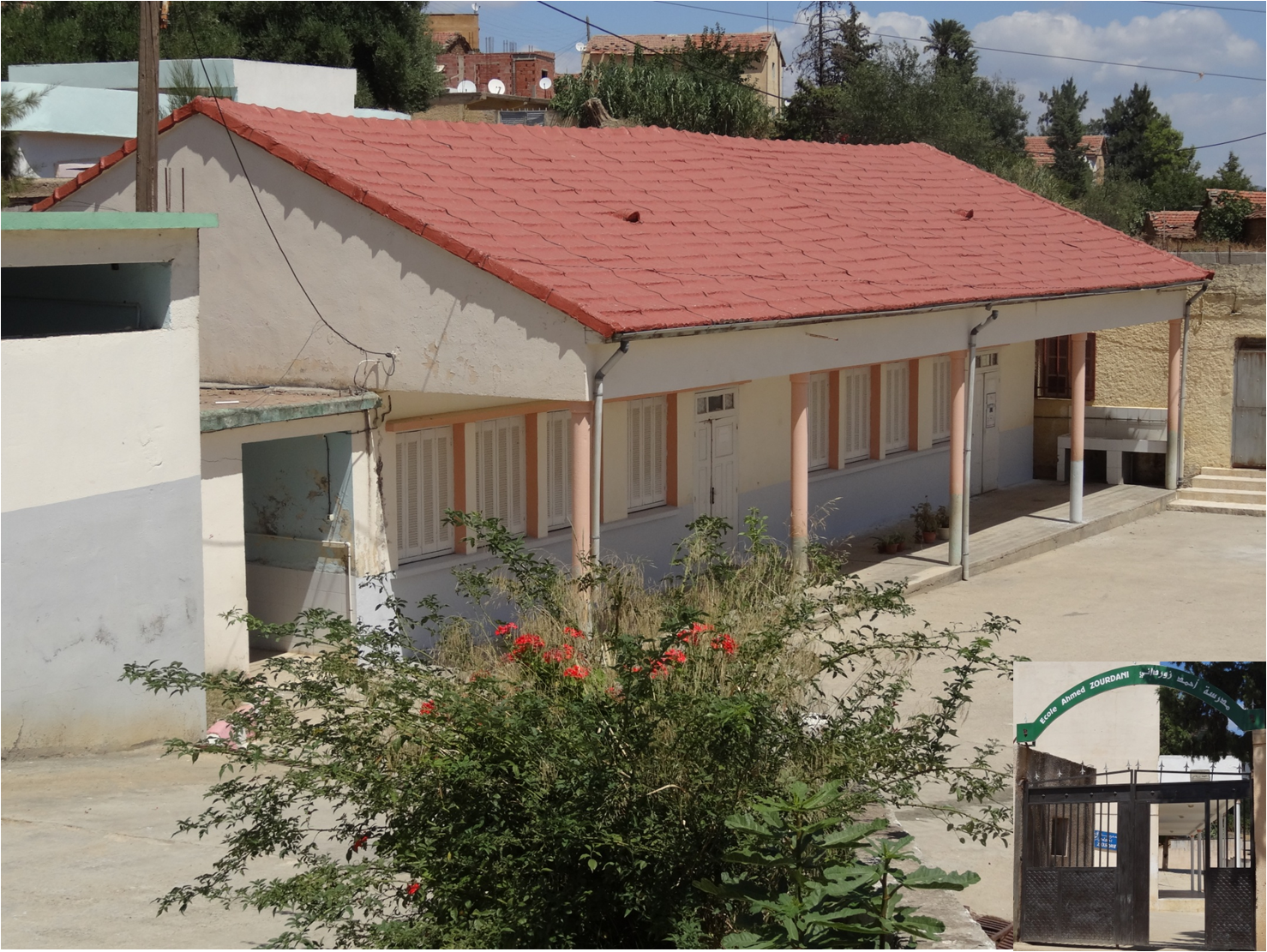
Primary School Ahmed Zourdani at Ibouhaténe

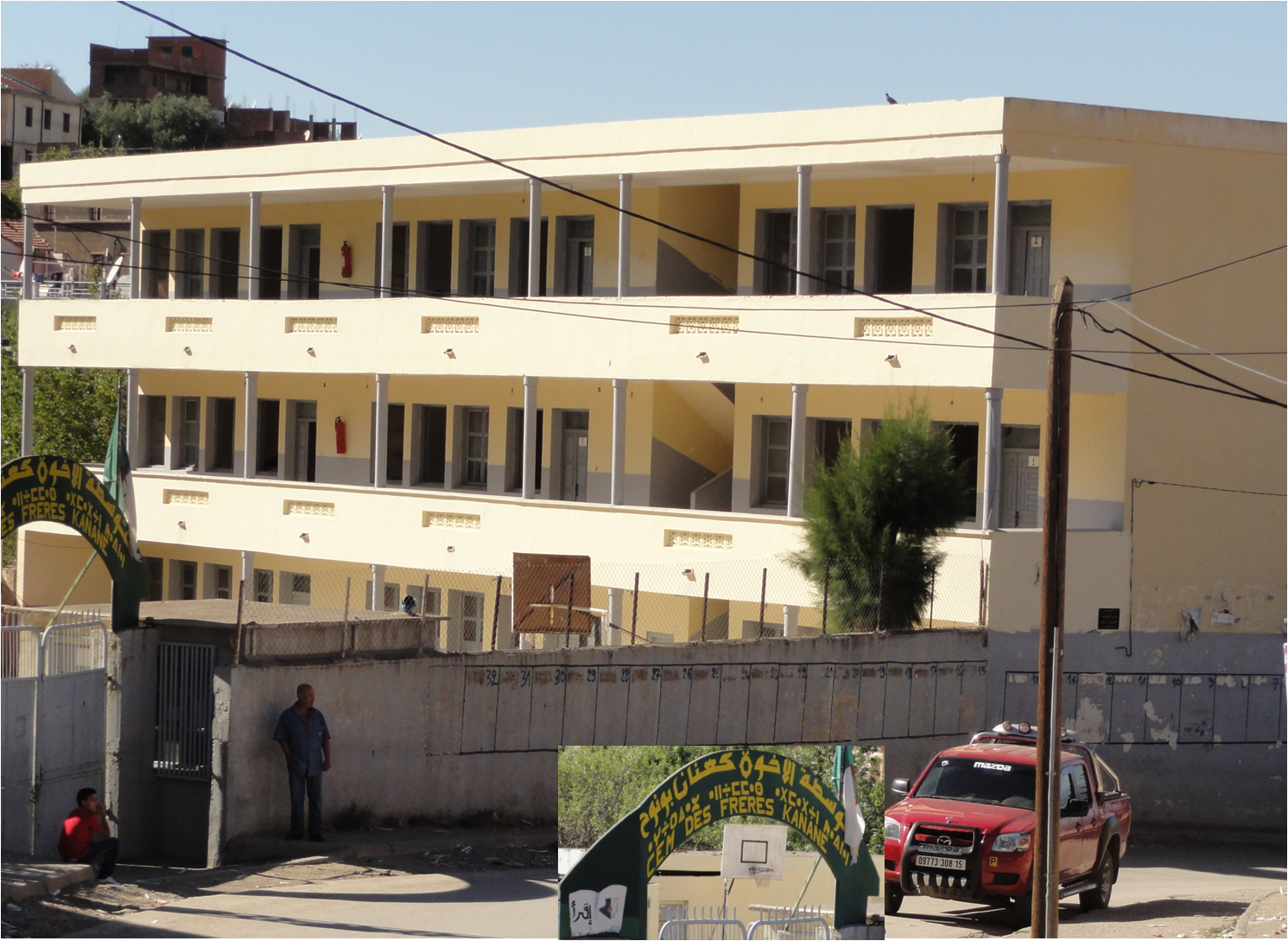
Middle School Frères Kanane

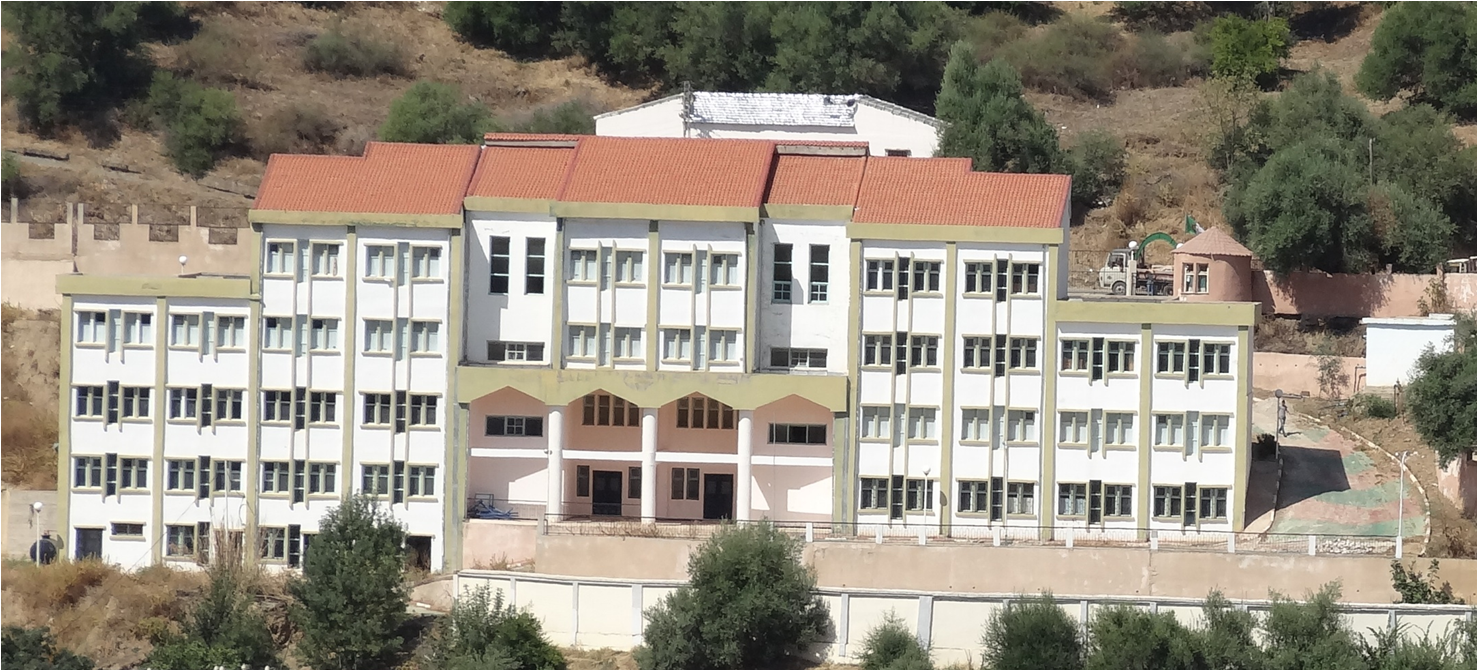
New Middle School

It was only in 1985 following a new administrative landscape that Bounouh was granted its title of commune again and tied to the much prosperous and developed Boghni which had already been elevated to the status of Daïra (District). A new Town Hall with better facilities was built and the old town Hall was changed into a Center of Further Education.

== Economics and infrastructure ==
Despite its glorious past and harbouring several wealthy families, people from Ath Smaïl never sought to invest locally and Bou-nouh is actually a poor town. In a census published in 2001, it is lagging in 11th place from the bottom, behind 40 other communes within the province of Tizi-Ouzou. Neighbouring Frikat has a much higher ratio of wealth than Bou-Nouh. The poverty index means that Bou-Nouh could not self-support itself. Its entrepreneurial citizen preferred to invest and set up their commercial ventures and industries outside Ath Smaïl, namely in Boghni and as far afield as Algiers. In truth, the landscape, road networks and lack of electricity, water and telephone were not conducive to a business and entrepreneurial environment. Despite one hydroelectric power station on its territory and another in adjacent Ath Kouffi, the homes in Ath Smaïl only received electricity in the late 80's after much protest and people stopped lighting their candles and afegag. Drinking water is now available in most houses and it is planned to supply cooking gas to every house in Ath Smaïl.

Most farming land is located in Azaghar. Azaghar represents a truly vast expanse and for land attached to Ath Smaïl this represents Thiwririne, bordering Frikat and Ain Zaouïa, Lemqessa, Thoulmouts, Taghza, and Lemhella where wheat, barley and fodder are cultivated. This is why the French erected a railway line crossing this rich and vast land to transport the goods. Viaducts in good condition are still in existence at Thiwrine, known locally as Lghar n Tekoukt, and at Laanasser in Boghni either side of the river between Azagher (land of Saidani Moh Said N Ath U Said) and Azouggar (land of Yahiatene). As far as trees are concerned, olives yield the largest revenue in Ath Smaïl followed by dried figs and acorns. Families cultivate their small holdings from September to May and allotments along the river in the summer. People also raise chicken and sometimes sheep or cows to help supplement the family income by selling a lamb or a calf every year. Ath Smaïl is also famous for its craft in pottery, raffia, weaving and sewing of Berber dresses.

There is one post office which covers all villages, two middle secondary schools and six primary schools for a population scattered across 23 villages, in total comprising nearly 10,000 inhabitants. School children do not have access to public transport and undertake long journeys in order to get to school, as is the case for the children from Thiwririne and Taghza to attend The Primary School Ahmed Zourdani at Ibouhaténe and from Helouane or Taghza or Thala Oulili to the Brothers Kaanane middle secondary school at Bou-Nouh. These walking journeys consist of a few kilometres return journey to school on a daily basis. In 2011, Bounouh commissioned a second middle school, two health clinics at Helouane and Ath Telha, and a library named after Farid Ali, premises for the unemployed, cooking gas, and a highly performing football team, The IRBB (Itihad Ryadhi Baladiat Bounouh), to foster the fantastic local talent. However, children are very motivated and their dedication is unsurpassable given the miserable economic and sociological upheavals in Kabylie. Nowadays, there are still 600 pupils from Ath Smaïl commuting to the higher secondary school (Lycée Zamoum) in Boghni. It is for this reason that the town has tabled a proposal for a high secondary school to share with the neighbouring commune of Frikat, etc. It was not until the late 1980s that Ath Smaïl had its first children complete postgraduate studies. During French colonisation, good pupils from Ath Smaïl achieved an excellent and envious Certificat d’Etudes Primaires (aged 12 to 13) and stopped education (mostly due to family pressure and lack of means to pursue their studies).

Given the lack of employment, people feel compelled to emigrate outside the region and look for work in other parts of Algeria and even abroad. Families rely immensely on war and work pensions to stave off the nightmare of poverty. The lack of economic development at Ath Smaïl is also rendered even more difficult, in fact complicated, by its proximity to Boghni which used to be the most developed town in Algeria in the 1970s. Again in the 1970s and 1980s, Ath Smaïl was neglected by the administrators of Boghni to the extent that the provision of public transport was withdrawn. Fortunately, the Belgacem brothers from L’Merdja stepped in with their coaches to take people to Boghni, Draa El Mizan and even to Rouiba for people employed at the state company for transport, SONACOM. Nowadays, the commune of Bou-Nouh continues to search for its destiny. It is heavily dependent on state subsidies and its administrative representatives shoulder a massive responsibility.

== Arts ==
Ath Smaïl is well known for its pottery, despite the proximity of Maâtkas and Ouadhias. Women decorate their own designs; they exploit several kinds of clay which they steal from open fields, usually on the day of the market which men attend in Boghni on Sundays. Women are very entrepreneurial; they make soap using spent cooking oil and marinate olives, tomatoes and peppers. During shortages of candles, they light the afegags using again spent oil. They embraced Recycle, Reduce and Reuse from an early age; in hardship, this was their motto. Just like men went to markets in Boghni on Sundays and Draâ-El Mizan on Thursdays, women had their own market on Wednesdays. Although, men were tolerated, stalls were run by women. They sold jewellery, pottery, and craft objects, especially made using raffia. The market is held near the Catholic Church.

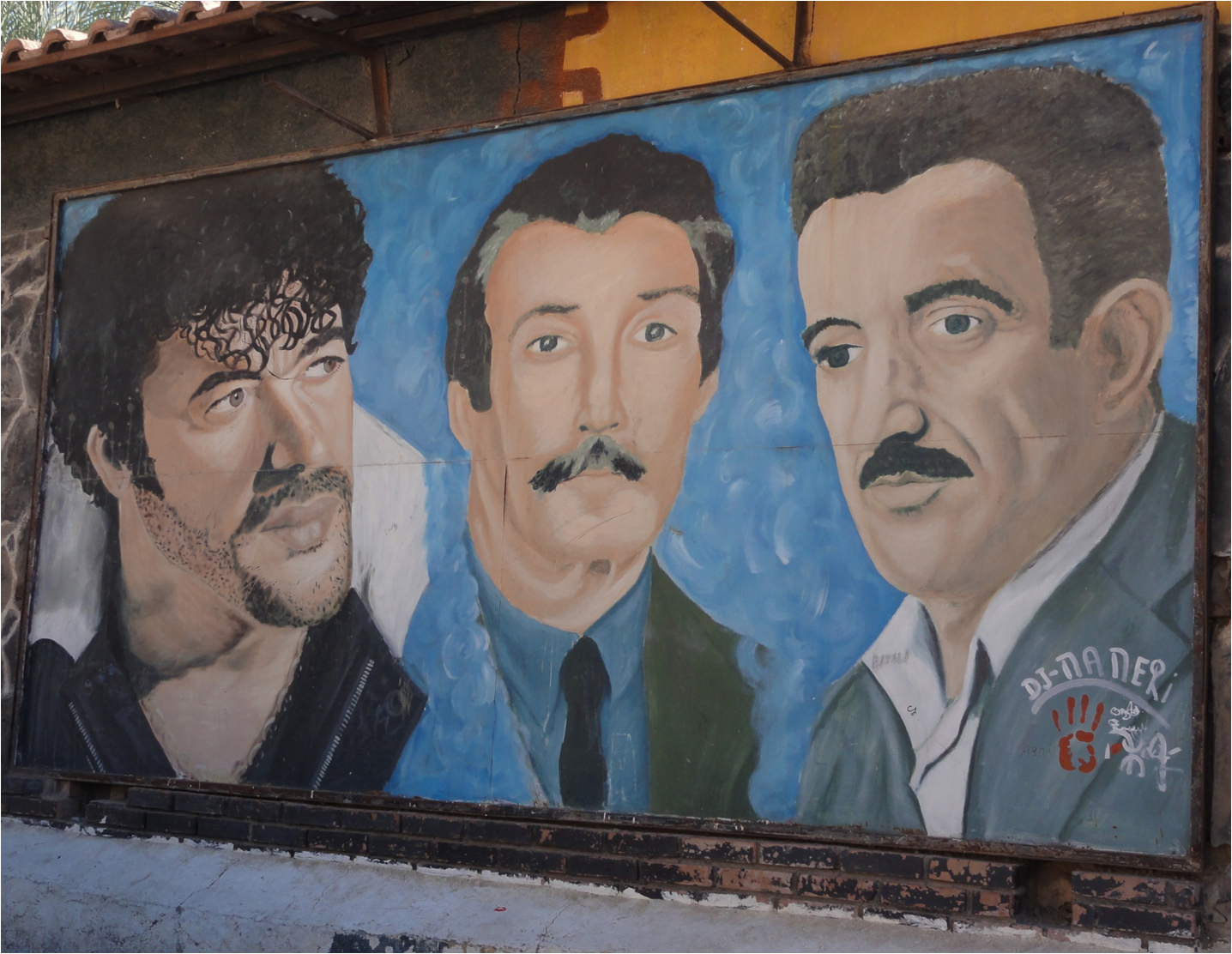
Monument

Rabia Ziani, a passionate, well published writer and pedagogue, is from Ath Smaïl. Several Algerian famous singers originate from Ath Smaïl. The famous film producer Amar Tribèche originates from Baâli. Farid Ali (né Khelifi Ali) fought for Algerian independence from the French and sang the evocative a yemma sbar ur e tsru (literally translated: mum, be patient and do not cry) and several other militant songs. After independence, he was a great sympathiser of the Berber Academy in Paris which became active in the recognition of the Berber language.

== Religious heritage ==
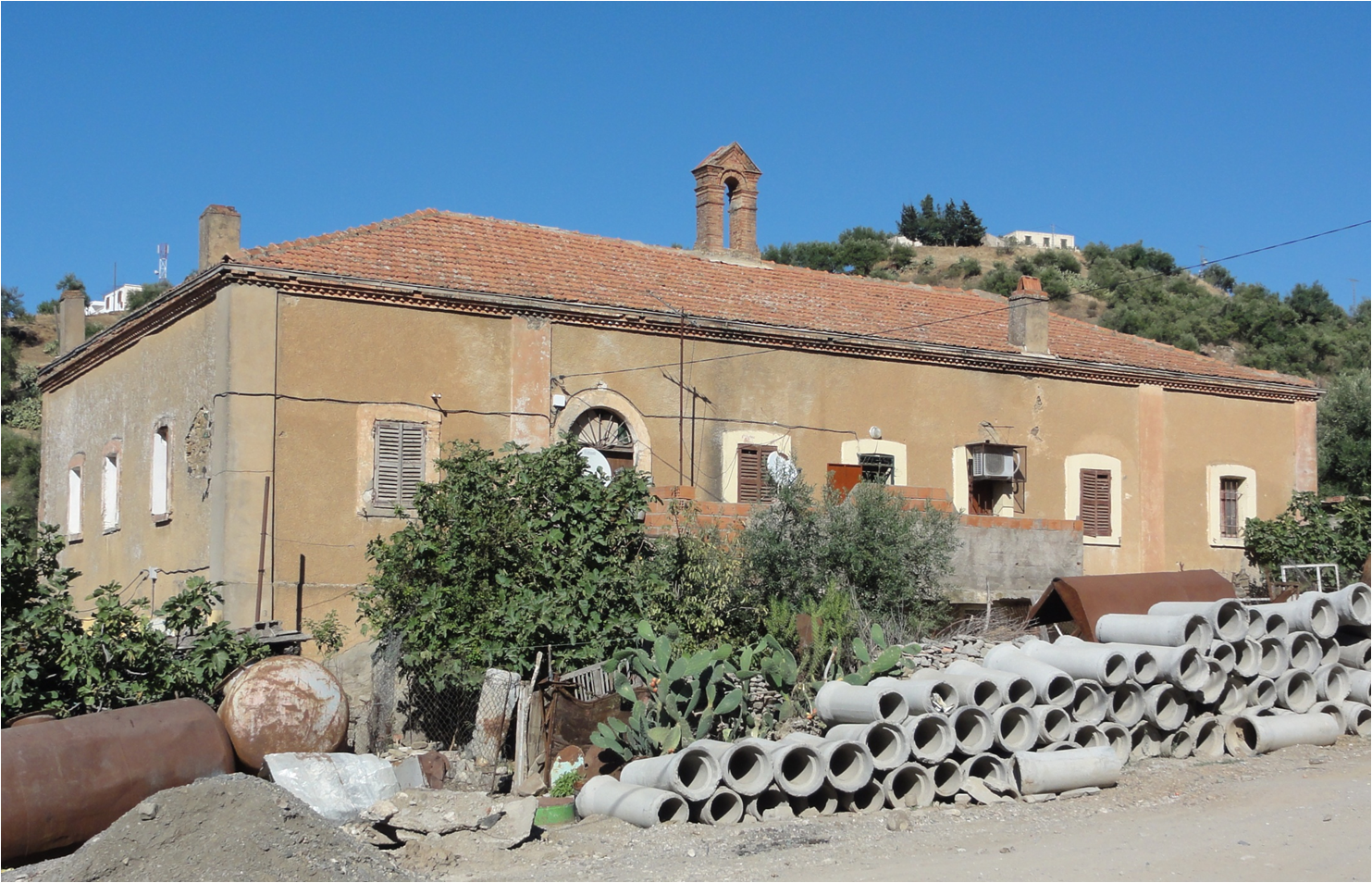
Cathedral

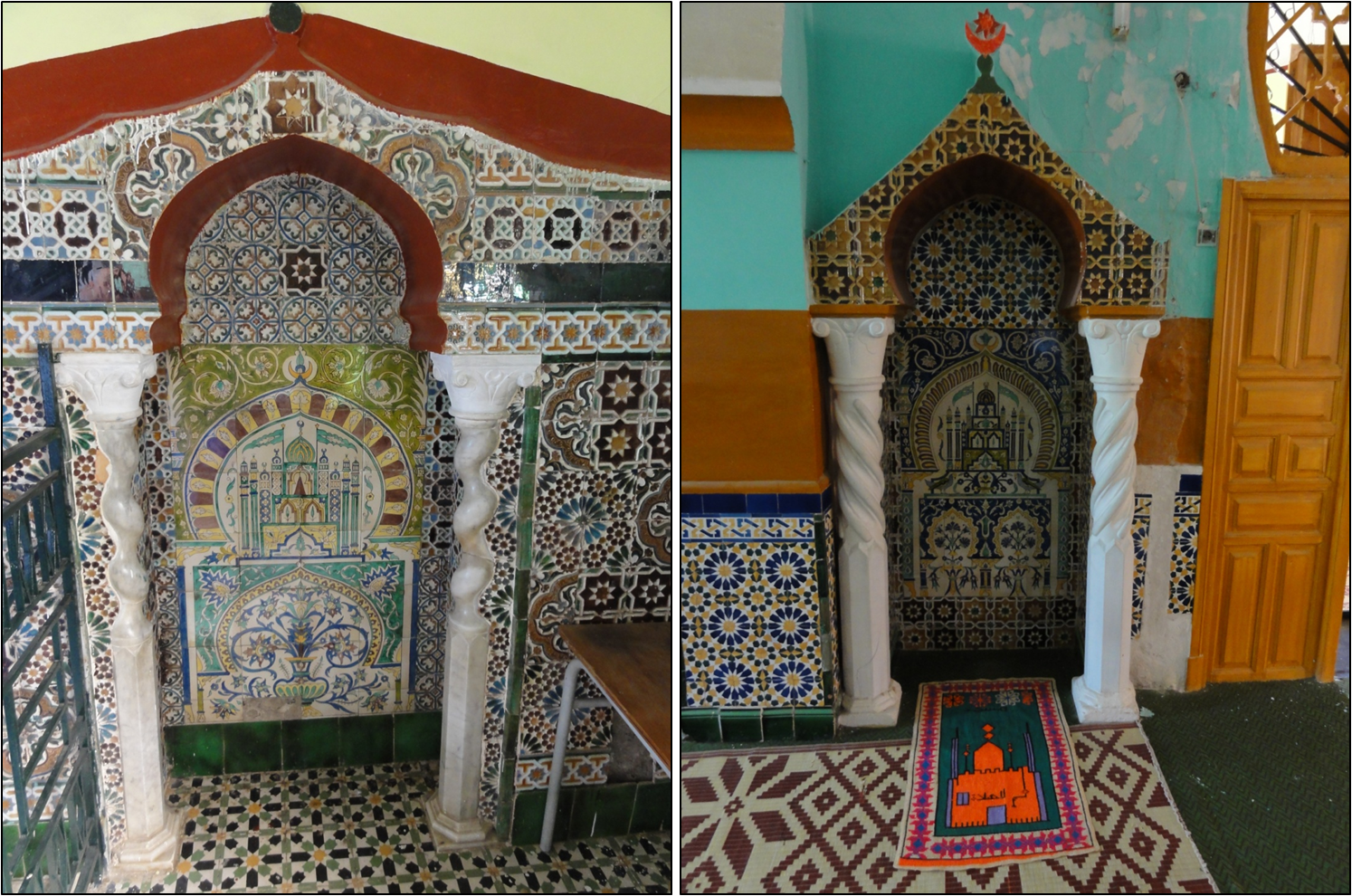
Inside Cheikh Ben Abderrahmane mosque

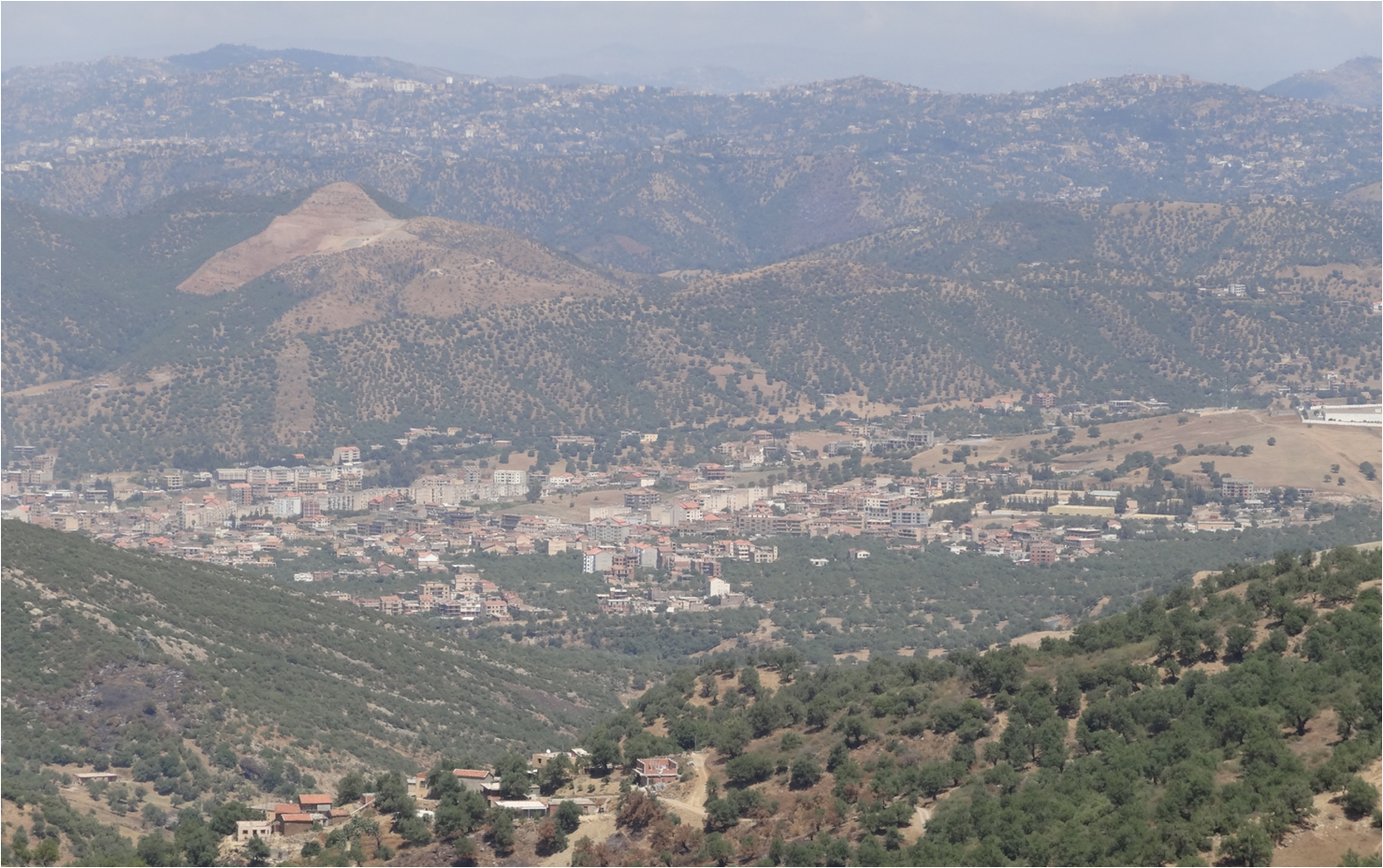
Cheikh Ben Abderrahmane provides a vantage point for a panoramic view of its surrounding villages and extends to Boghni

Ath Smaïl has a unique experience in the coexistence of two religions, namely the Catholic Church with the Nuns and Priests in Bou-Nouh and Islamic mosques of Sidi Ben Abderrahmane barely a kilometre away, Rebaâine Wali (40 Saints) at Awrir, Sidi Mansour at Tizi L Had, Si Mhend U Idir at Ibouhaténe, and Ath Sidi Lounis at Tala Oulili. Nowadays, it is mostly for the Cheikh Ben Abderrahmane that Ath Smaïl is most famous for. The Saint exists both at Ath Smaïl and Al Hama in Algiers. Even his death in 1793 became a legend; the people of Algiers and of Ath Smaïl embarked in a dispute about his corpse because each side wanted him for their region and started stealing each other his corpse. Calm resumed when both the inhabitant of Ath Smaïl found the Saint buried at their cemetery and the people of Algiers also found the Saint at their cemetery. It was customary for the Ath Smaïl to vow on a lewli yebdan ghef sin (literally: the Saint who split in two), in reference to this mysterious doubling of the tomb. This explains why he is also known as Bou Qabrine, i.e. the Saint with two tombs. Today, the two zaouïas of Bou-Nouh and Algiers which carry his name continue to draw visitors from all corners of Algeria, especially at religious festivals.

The Cheikh Sidi M’hemed Ben Aberrahmane is a native of Ath Smaïl and was born around 1715 in the village of Baâli. He is said to be a descendant of Fatima Ezzahra, the daughter of Prophet Mohamed (his lineage is Cheikh Sidi M’hemed son of Abderahmane son of Ahmed son of Ben Youcef son of Abi Kacem son of Ali Ibrahim son of Abderahmane son of Ahmed son of El Hussein son of Mohamed son of El Hussein son of Fatima Ezzahra). He studied cultural sciences at the Zaouïa of Cheikh Essedik Ouarab of Larbaâ N Ath Irathen, moved to Algiers, accomplished his Hajj at Mecca (Saudi Arabia) and then to El Azhar in Cairo (Egypt) where he spent 25 years studying and carrying out research in theology . He learned the figh under Cheikh Mohamed Salem El Hafnaoui who sent him to India and Sudan to teach the Koran and the Sunna. He invented his own religious path called Tariqa Rahmania. After fulfilling this mission, he returned to Egypt. In 1769, he returned to Algeria, further developed his path and settled himself between Algiers and Ath Smaïl where he set up the zaouïa of the Ghechtoula at Ath Smaïl. It is thus at Ath Smaïl where he established his zaouïa and taught Koran and the El Khaloutia method to his followers. After a few years he felt the urge to expand his teaching to a larger audience. He settled in El Hama (Algiers) where again he established his zaouïa. He died in 1793 at Ath Smaïl. Given the common heritage, Bou-Nouh is now twinned with Sidi M’hemed in Algiers.

== See also ==
- Zaouïa de Bounouh
