= Ménerville =

- Commune
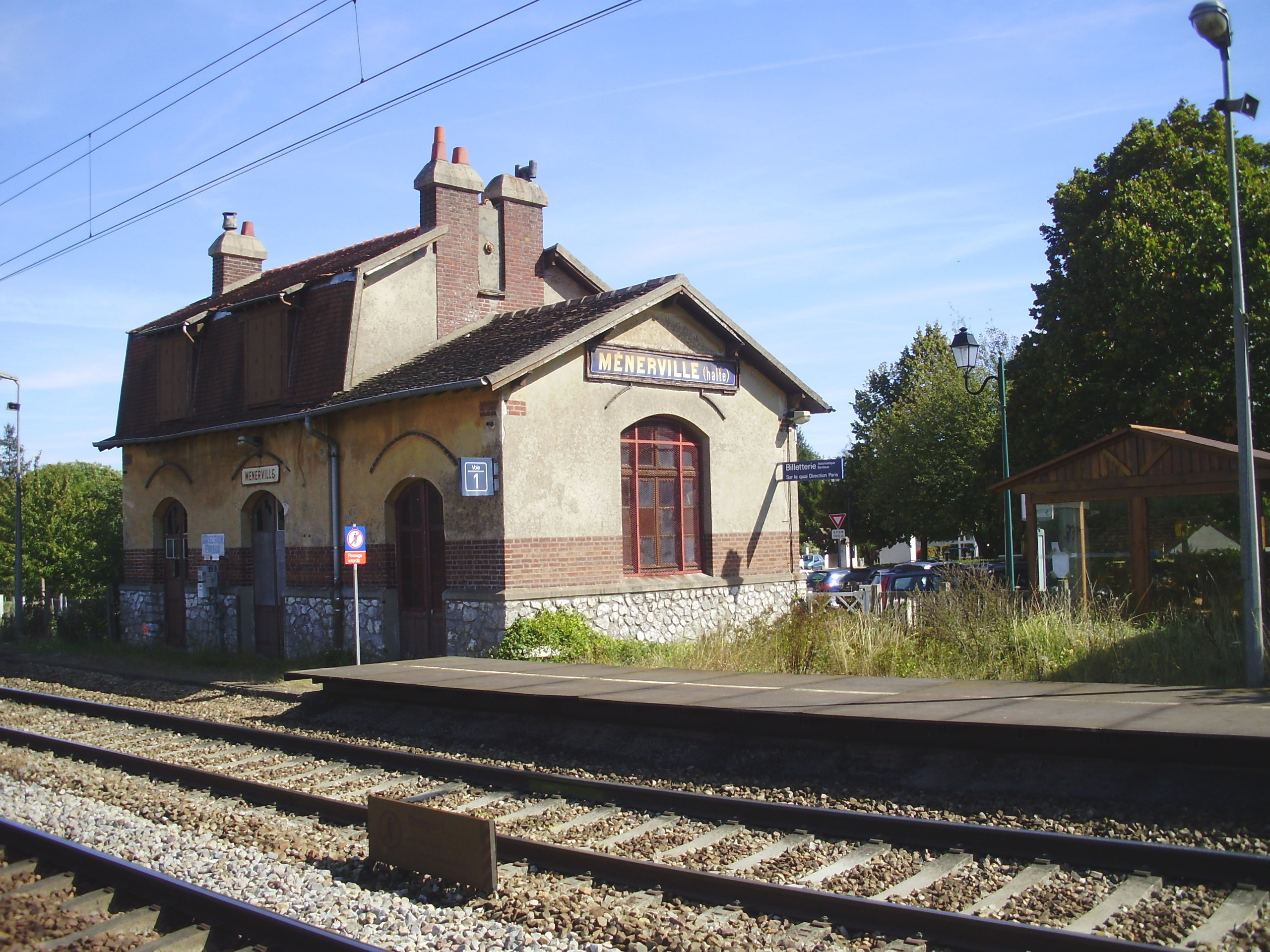
- Ménerville railway station
- Location of Ménerville
- Location within France Location within Île-de-France (region)
- Coordinates: 48°57′18″N 1°36′13″E
- Country: France
- Region: Île-de-France
- Department: Yvelines
- Arrondissement: Mantes-la-Jolie
- Canton: Bonnières-sur-Seine

Government
  - Mayor (2020–2026): Sylvain Thuret
- Area^{1}: 3.51 km^{2} (1.36 sq mi)
- Elevation: 142 m (466 ft)
- Highest elevation: 162 m (531 ft)
- Lowest elevation: 84 m (276 ft)
- Population (2023): 216
  - Density: 61.5/km^{2} (159/sq mi)
- Time zone: UTC+01:00 (CET)
  - Summer (DST): UTC+02:00 (CEST)
- INSEE/Postal code: 78385 /78200
- ^{1} French Land Register data, which excludes lakes, ponds, glaciers > 1 km^{2} (0.386 sq mi or 247 acres) and river estuaries.

Ménerville (French pronunciation: [menɛʁvil]) is a commune in the Yvelines department in the Île-de-France region in north-central France.

== See also ==
- Communes of the Yvelines department
