= Emir Khaled =

Algerian nationalist (1875–1936)

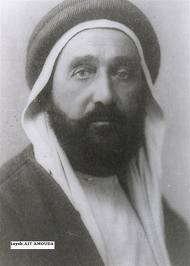
Prince Khaled.jpg

Khalid ibn al-Hashimi ibn Abd al-Qadir (1875 – January 1936; Arabic: خالد بن الهاشمي بن عبد القادر الجزائري, romanized: Khālid ibn al-Hāshimi ibn ʿAbd al-Qādir al-Jazā’iri) was the grandson of the military leader Abd al Qadir and was for a time a prominent opponent of the nature of French colonial rule in Algeria.

== Early years ==
Khaled ibn Hashimi was born in 1875 in Syria, where he grew up. He studied in Paris and went on to become an officer in the French army. He served with the army in Morocco.

== Politics ==
Khaled ibn Hashimi was well known in Algeria thanks to his grandfather's protracted struggle with the French, and he was commonly referred to as the Emir. In 1913, he signed the program of the Young Algerians. He went on to help establish the Union Franco-Algérienne in 1914. Khaled continued to serve in the French army, and fought in the trenches during the First World War until he was struck down with Tuberculosis.

After the Jonnart Law was passed in 1919, Khaled split with other members of the Union Franco-Algérienne such an Benthai, on the grounds that the Jonnart Law was insufficient. In the elections that followed in the same year, Khaled won a major victory. However he was feared by the colons who got the result overturned and rigged the election that followed in 1920. By 1923, Khaled was becoming frustrated with French intransigence, and was becoming isolated from his allies who feared his personal influence. Further, he had built up considerable debts which left him vulnerable to attack. The French government offered to pay off these debts if he would go into exile. He accepted this offer, withdrew from the election he was contesting, closed down his personal publication, and went into exile in Damascus in 1924. From there and from Paris, he continued to pursue his political program, but his influence declined. Over time, Khaled moved increasingly towards more secular and nationalist politics, appearing alongside communists and others.

When Khaled died in January 1936, there was an outpouring of grief in Algeria. He became, for many, a symbol of Algerian nationalism. However, there has been some controversy over whether Khaled can be defined as a nationalist, due to his demands for Algerians to be able to maintain their Islamic identity and his association with secular nationalists in his later years, or whether he was an assimilationist, due to his demands for reform within the French system.
