= Messaoud Nedjahi =

Algerian batnian writer and singer-songwriter (1954–2021)

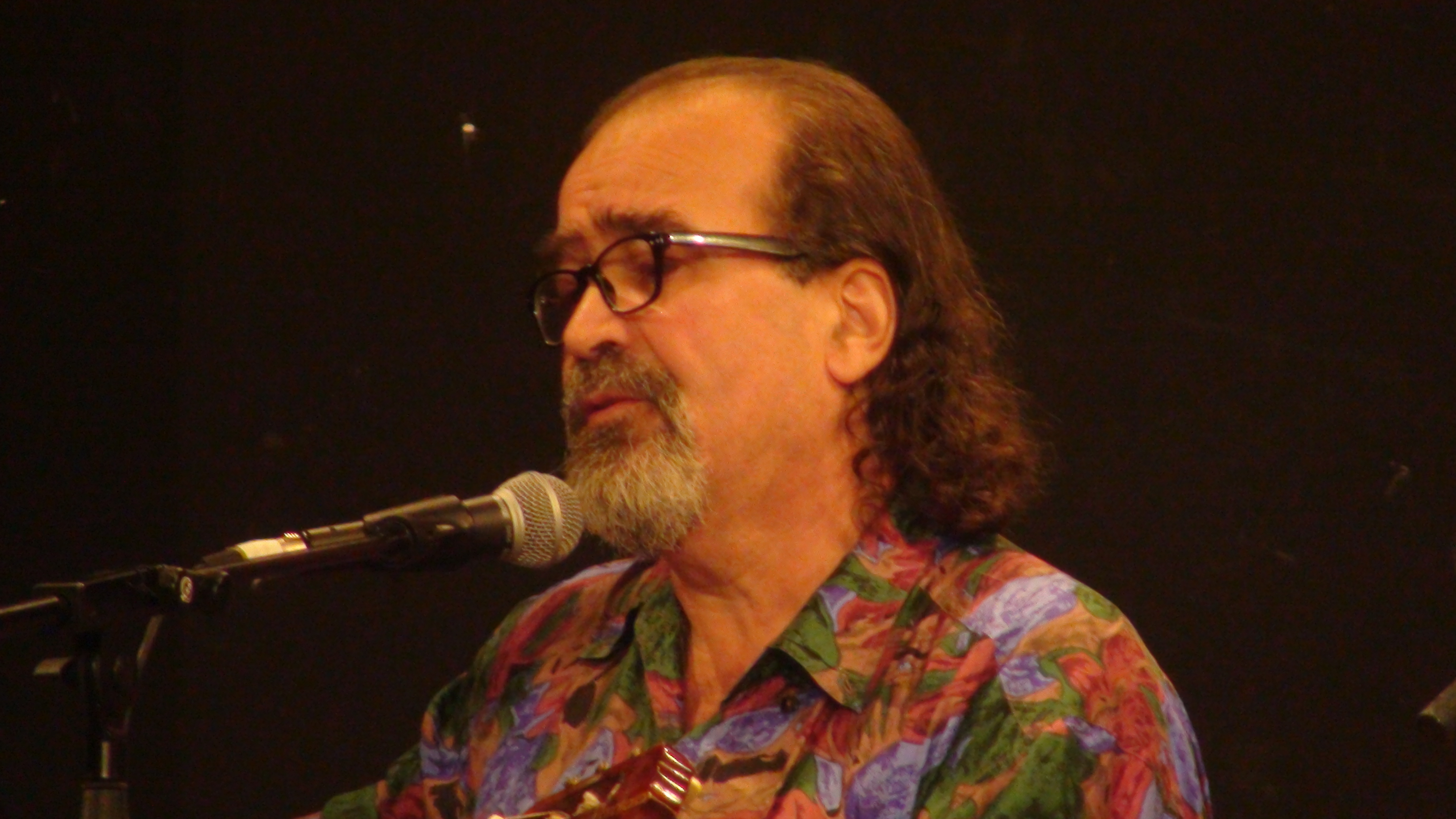
- Nedjahi in 2015
- Born: 24 January 1954; M'Chouneche originally from Tkout, Algeria.
- Died: 30 August 2021 (aged 67); Paris, France
- Occupations: Writer; Singer-Songwriter

Messaoud Nedjahi (Arabic: مسعود نجاحي; 24 January 1954 – 30 August 2021) was an Algerian Batnian writer and singer-songwriter.

== Biography ==
Nedjahi was born in M'Chouneche on 24 January 1954 and moved to Batna in 1958 following expulsion from the French government. His father was deported to Cayenne and died in 1970. Nedjahi underwent persecution for speaking the Shawiya language, with his play, Jugurta, being banned in 1974. Afterwards, he translated poems in Shawiya.

In 1972, Nedjahi began studying at Constantine 1 University, beginning his exploration of the artistic world and allowing him to meet Cherif Merzouki, Abderrahmane Tamine, Abdelali Boughrara, Jeballah Bellakh, Mohamed Demagh, and Hocine Houara. One of his art exhibitions was vandalized and his friend, Safia de Tamlilt, was burned. In 1979, he met Dihya and became her writer, composer, and arranger.

In 1980, Nedjahi participated in the Berber Spring in Algiers, Tizi Ouzou, and Boumerdès and refused to enlist for his Algerian military service. After the threat of imprisonment, he went into exile in France in 1981, where he stayed for 27 years.

Nedjahi devoted himself to writing and publishing, reissuing works by Apuleius, such as The Golden Ass. He also led conferences which covered themes of Berber civilization, personal identity, Apuleius, and the Berber experience. In 2008, he returned to Algeria and settled in the Aurès region. In 2016, he was invited to give a lecture on the history of Batna at the Centre universitaire Saleh Daoud.

Nedjahi died of COVID-19 in Paris on 30 August 2021, at the age of 67.

== Books ==
- La becquée n'a pas suffi
- Aurès insolite
- Aurès insoumis
- Aurès ou les feuillets morts d'un amnésique
- Massinissa, le seigneur des coquelicots
- Jugurtha, l'héritier du coquelicot
- Autopsie d'une identité
- Profession : Infirmière
- Tamenraset sous la neige
- Ug Zelmad l'insoumis
- Les anges naissent en Aurès
- Les trois précieuses
- La muse m'a dit
- Systole et diastole

== Musical albums ==
- A yudan!
- Iwal
- Tulawin n tmurt inu
- Mas Aksel
