= Chaoui people =

Berber ethnic group in northeast Algeria

Chaoui people (Shawiya)
Išawiyen ⵉⵛⴰⵡⵉⵢⵏ
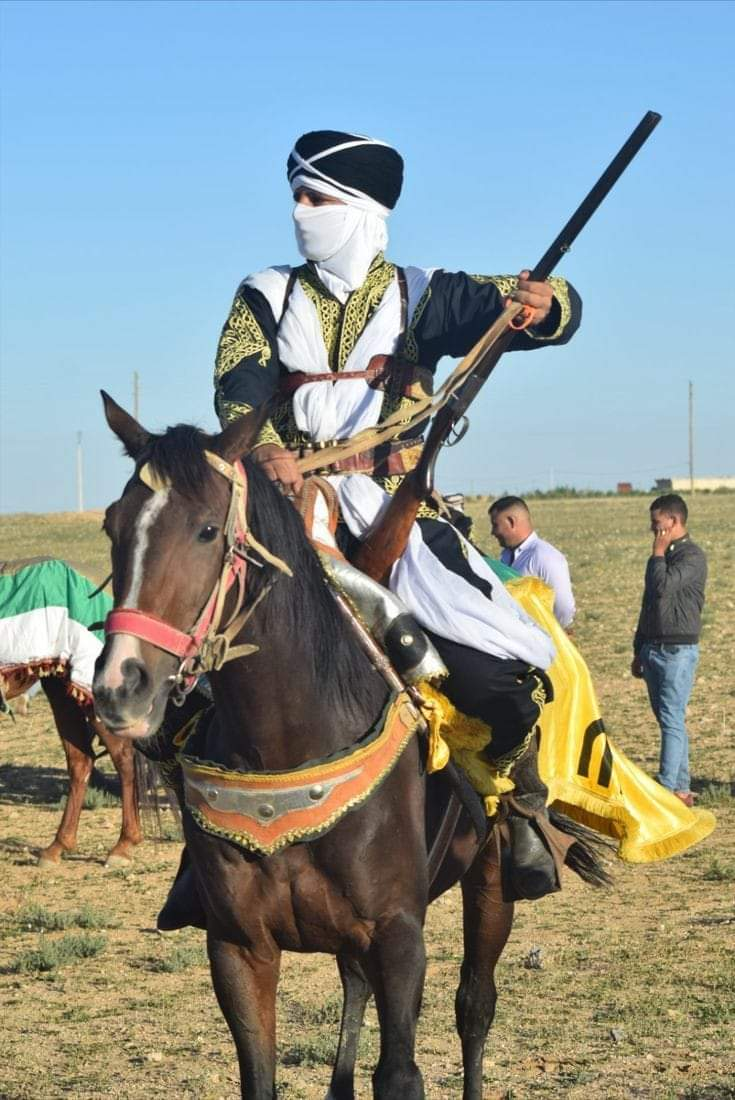
- Chaoui horserider

Total population
- 5,000,000-6,000,000

Regions with significant populations
- Algeria: c. 4,870,000
- France: c. 800,000

Languages
- Shawiya, Algerian Arabic, French

Religion
- Majority: Sunni Islam Minorities: Christianity, Judaism, irreligion

Related ethnic groups
- Kabyles, Riffians, Mozabites, Chenouas, other Berbers

The Chaoui people or Shawiya (Tachawit: Išawiyen / ⵉⵛⴰⵡⵉⵢⵏ, Arabic: الشاوية) are a Berber ethnic group native to the Aurès region in northeastern Algeria.

They call themselves Išawiyen/Icawiyen (pronounced [iʃawijən]) and speak the Shawiya language. They are the second largest Tell Atlas Berber-speaking ethnicity, alongside the Kabyles and Chenouas.

== Etymology ==
According to de Slane, translator of the books of Ibn Khaldun, the term Chaoui/Shawi means "shepherd" and designates the Zenata Berbers.

== History ==
Historically, the Aurès Mountains served as a refuge for Berber peoples, forming a base of resistance against the Roman Empire, the Vandals, the Byzantine Empire and Arabs.

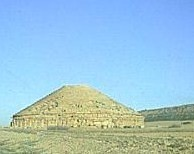
Madghacen, the burial of Numidias kings

The patriarch of Berbers is believed to have been Madghacen, the common ancestor of the Zenata and of the Botri as well. Ibn Khaldun identified the Zenata as Berbers. Modern historians rank this Berber region within the group of Numidians and Gaetuli or the much more ancient Meshwesh, Maesulians and Mazaxes, from whom the Zenata formed, the main inhabitants of the Aurès in the Middle Ages. Chaoui clans known by Ibn Khaldoun were the Ifren, Maghrawa, Djerawa, Abdalwadides, Howara and Awarba.

After the independence of Algeria, the Chaouis remained localized mainly in the Auresian region. They are the second largest Berber-speaking group in terms of number of speakers, the first being the Kabyle.

== Language ==
Map of linguistic areas in North-Eastern Algeria (in French)

The Chaoui traditionally speak the Shawiya language (Berber: Tachawit). It belongs to the Berber branch of the Afro-Asiatic family, and is a variety of the Zenati languages. Shawiya is a closely related cluster of dialects spoken in the Aurès region (Berber: Awras) of eastern Algeria and surrounding areas including Batna, Khenchela, south Sétif, Oum El Bouaghi, Souk Ahras, Tébessa, and the north part of Biskra. Recently the Shawiya language, together with the Kabyle language, has begun to achieve some cultural prominence due to the Berber cultural and political movements in Algeria.

== Genetics ==
Scientists have studied modern maternal haplogroups collected from 264 Algerian Chaoui Berbers, and found them to be linked to Southern Europe, Middle East and Sub-Saharan Africa. The times of coalescence for select European clades such as ~6,000 ybp for H1cb1, U3a1c, and U5b1b1e could be traced to the Neolithic. The other European origin lineages like H1e1a, were given a time of ~3000 ybp, as they were also found in the Canary Islands. Middle Eastern origin lineages like J2a2d were dated to ~9,000 ybp, and was said to represent potential pre-agricultural contact between the Near-East and North Africa. While others like T1a7 was associated with Bedouin expansions into the Maghreb from 1,000 ybp. Sub-Saharan lineages like L3e5, L3b1a9a were dated to ~ 10,000-5000 ybp, and may be from trans-Saharan migration during the Green Sahara period with a prehistoric origin. However, the great majority of sub-Saharan sequences in North Africa do not form phylogenetic clades, and most sub-Saharan African mitogenomes have a recent arrival into the region during trans-Saharan slave trades.

== Culture and art ==
Chaoui music is a specific style of Berber music. The Shawia dance is called Rahaba; men and women dancing at weddings. There are many 20th century singers, such as Aïssa Djermouni, Ali Khencheli, Massinissa, Ishem Boumaraf, Djamel Sabri, Groupe Iwal, Houria Aïchi, etc.

Chaoui painters and sculptors (of whom there are many) include Cherif Merzouki, Abdelkhader Houamel, Hassane Amraoui, Adel Abdessemed, and Mohamed Demagh.

The fantasia is a traditional exhibition of horsemanship in the Aurès performed during cultural festivals.

The Chaoui were featured in Amor Hakkar's 2008 film La Maison jaune.

Examples of Chaoui craftwork
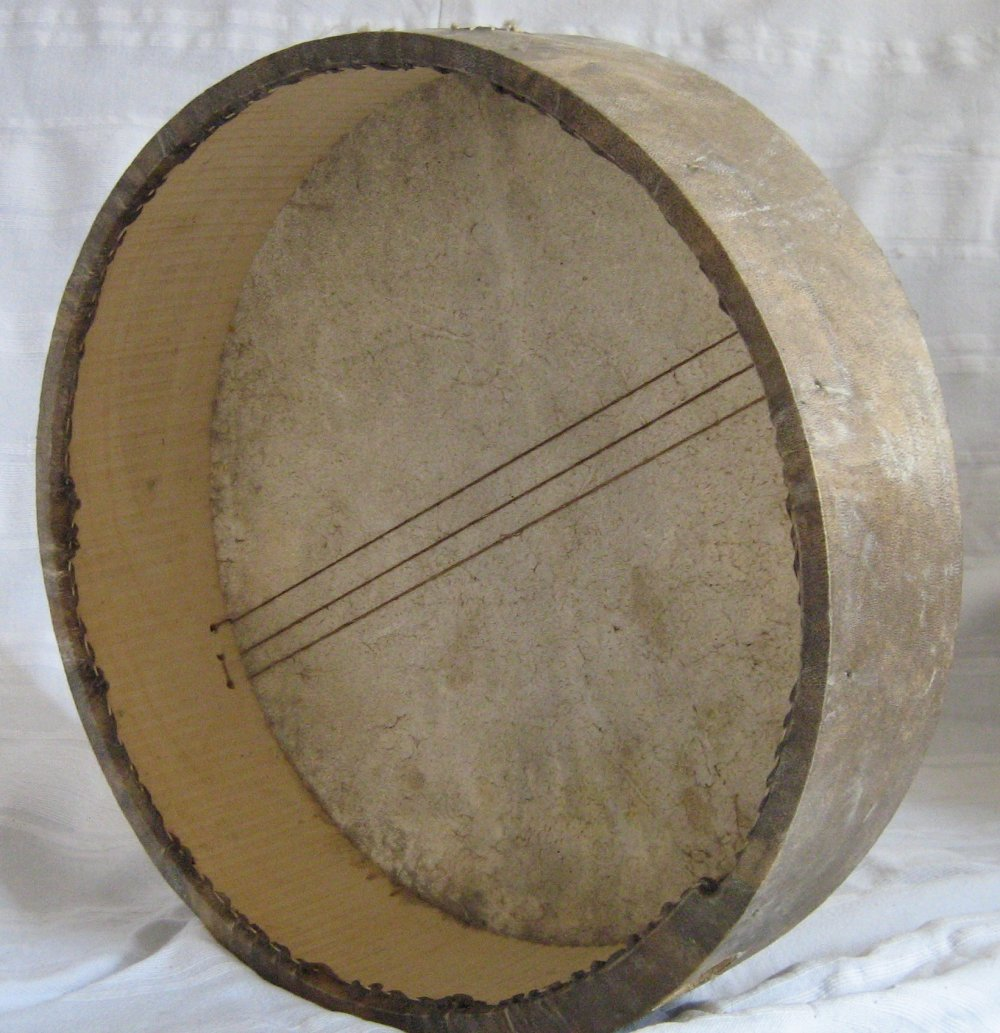
Bendir with snares.

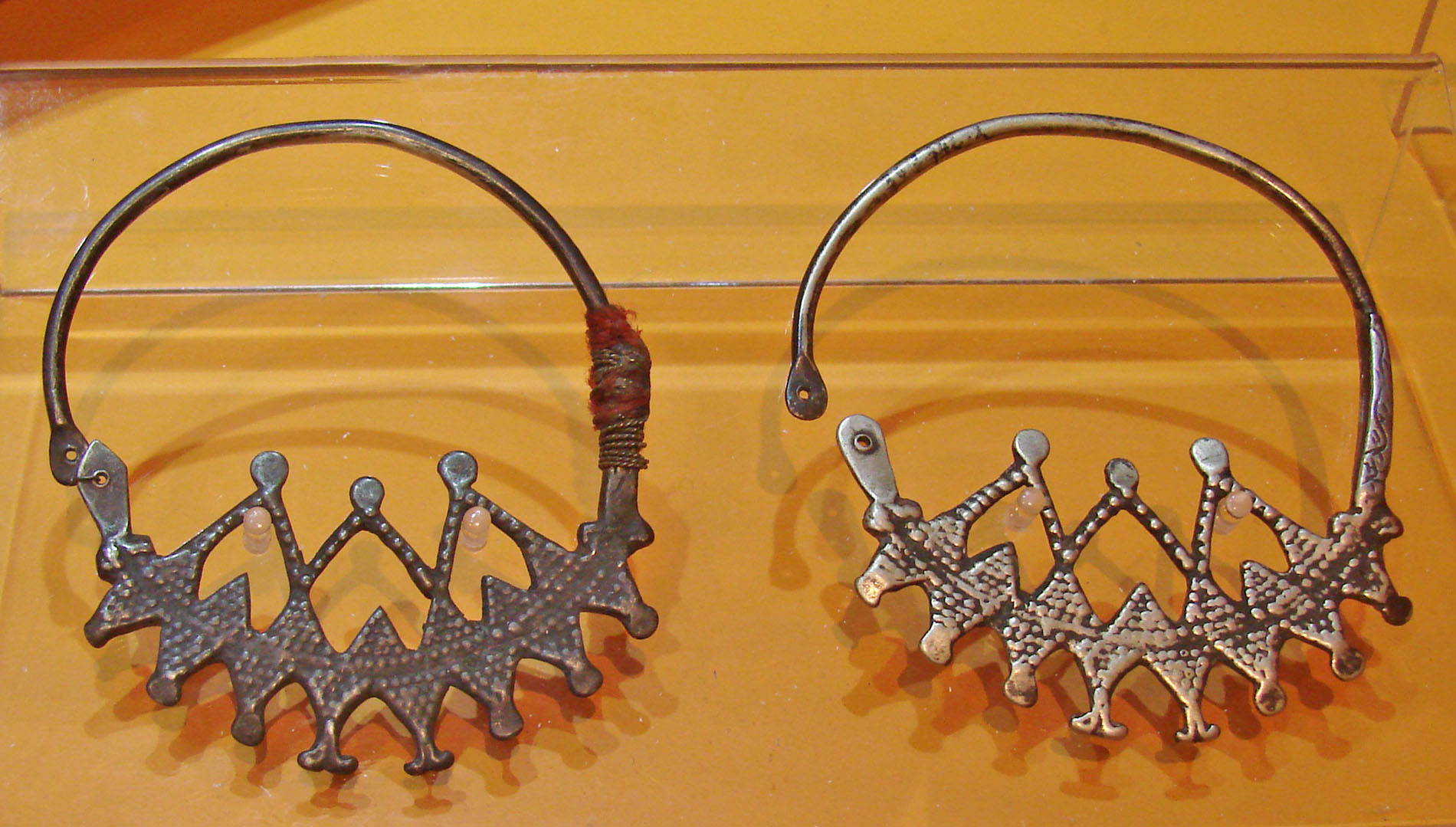
Chaoui jewelry, Museum of Man, Paris, during an exhibition Germaine Tillion.

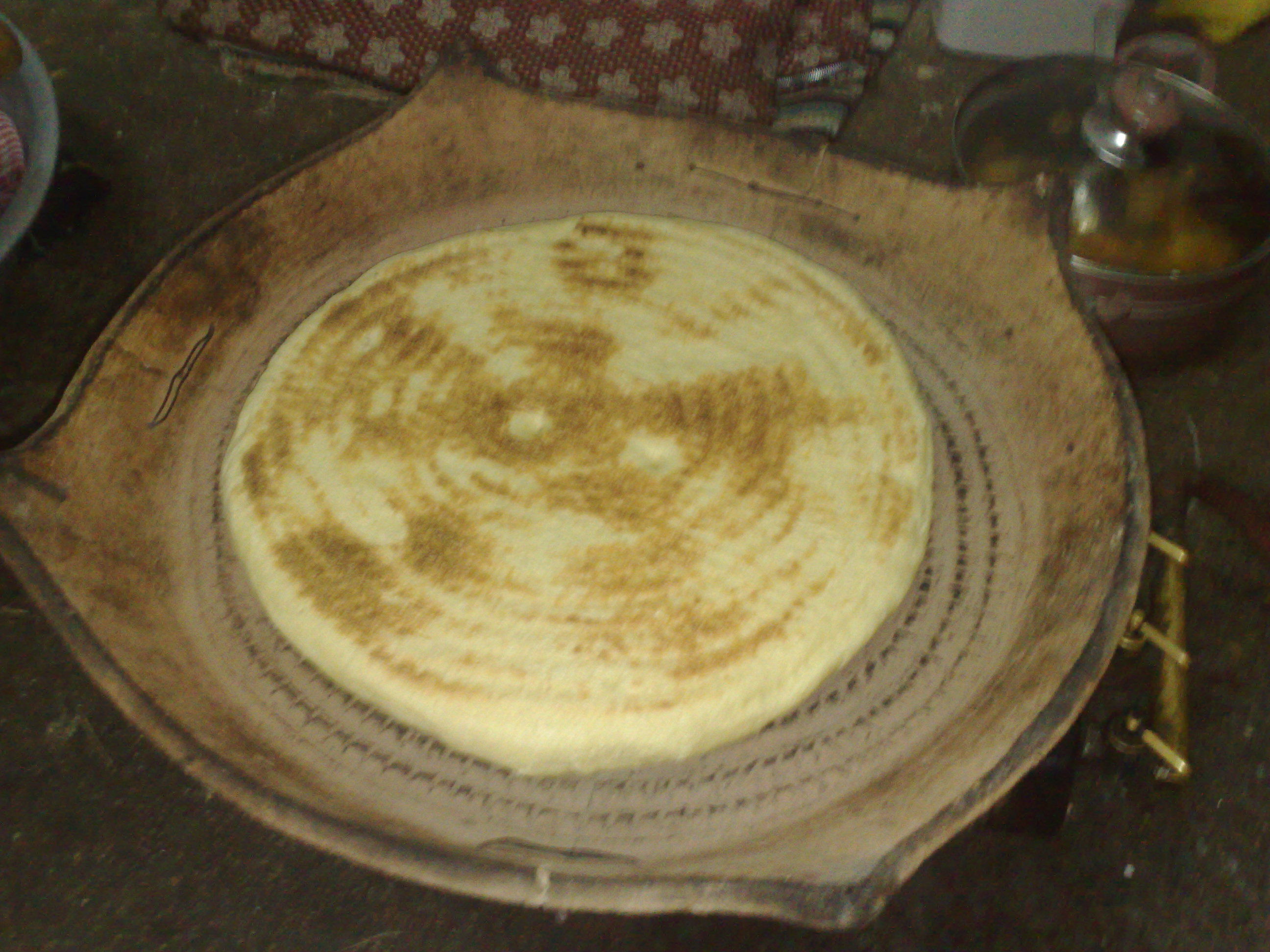
Chaoui bread.

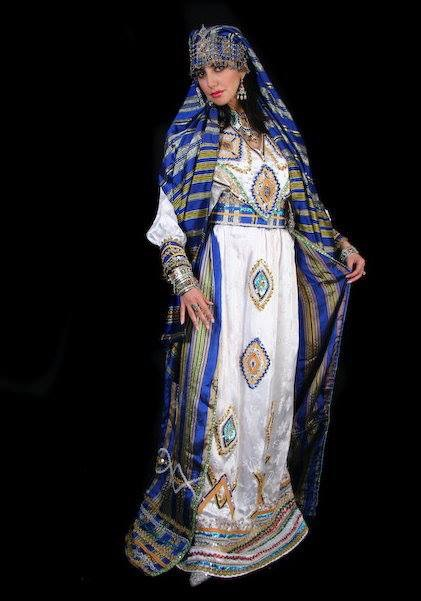
A woman wearing traditional chaoui dress.

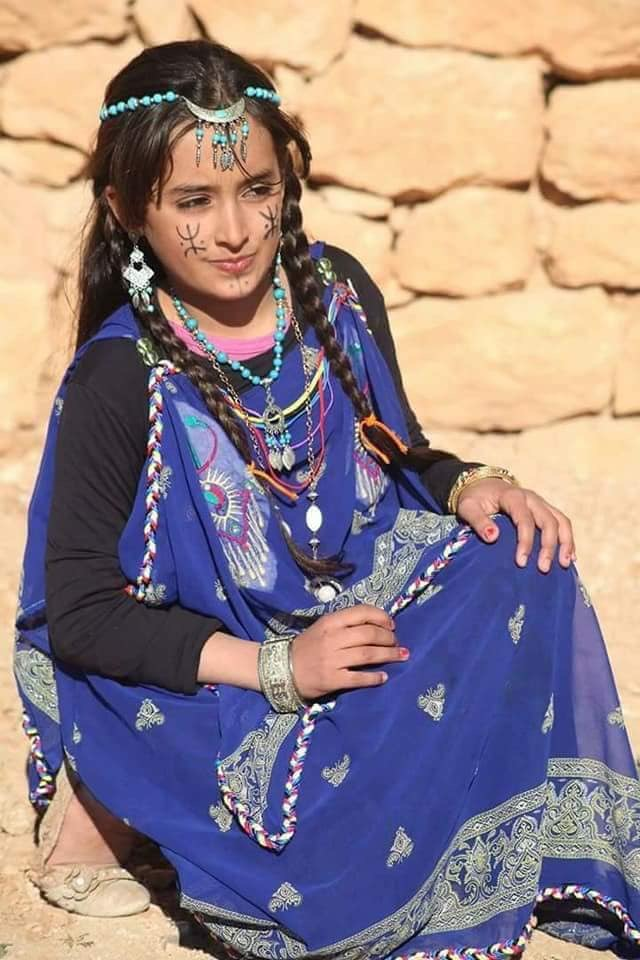
An Algerian girl wearing traditional chaoui dress.

== Bibliography ==
- Basset A., Atlas linguistique des parlers berbères, Alger, 1936 and 1939 (+ cartes).
- Basset A., "Présentation de cartes linguistiques berbères", Comptes Rendus du Groupe Linguistique d’Études Chamito-Sémitiques, 1–2, 1934/1937, p. 42/p. 81-82.
- Basset, A., "Sur la toponymie berbère et spécialement sur la toponymie chaouïa Aït Frah", Onomastica, 1948, p. 123-126.
- Basset A., Textes berbères de l'Aurès (parler des Aït Frah), Paris, Publ. de l'Institut d'Études Orientales, 1961.
- Basset R., Loqmân berbère ... , Paris, 1890 (15 textes de l’Aurès).
- Basset R., "Notice sur le chaouïa de la province de Constantine (Sedrata)", Journal asiatique, 1896, 36p.
- Boughida B.K., Bibliographie sur l’Aurès de 1830 à 1880, 103p., 2cartes, 760 réf. Bibl.:Mémoirede Licence Institut de bibliothéconomie Univ. De Constantine.
- Boulhaïs, N., "Recherches sur l'Aurès, bibliographie ordonnée", Études et Documents Berbères 15-16 (1998), pp. 284–312.
- Chaker S., "Chaoui/Chaouia (linguistique/littérature)", Encyclopédie berbère, XII, Aix-en-Provence, Edisud, 1993, p. 1875-1877.
- Chaker S., "Aurès (linguistique)", Encyclopédie berbère, VIII, Aix-en-Provence, Edisud, 1989–90, p. 1162-1169.
- Dejeux J., "La Kahina: de l’Histoire à la fiction littéraire. Mythe et épopée", Studi Magrebini, 15, 1983, p. 1-42.
- Dejeux J., "Le bandit d’honneur en Algérie, de la réalité et l’oralité à la fiction", Études et Documents Berbères, 4, 1988, p. 39-60 (deux poèmes sur Ben Zelmat, p. 56-7).
- Dejeux J., Les femmes d’Algérie; légendes, tradition, histoire, littérature, Paris, la Boîte à documents, 1987, 347 p.
- Djarallah A., "Un conte chaouï: Hend utteγyult", Awal, Cahiers d’études berbères, 1, 1985, p. 163-175.
- Djarallah A., "Baγyay, un conte chaouï", Awal, Cahiers d’études berbères, 3, 1987, p. 198-201.
- Djarallah A., "Un conte dans le parler des Aït Abdi (Aurès méridional)", Études et Documents Berbères, 4, 1988, p. 139-142.
- Djeghloul A., Éléments d’histoire culturelle algérienne, Alger : ENAL, 1984, 244 p.
- Faublée J. "A propos de Thérèse Rivière (1901-1970) et de ses missions dans l’Aurès", Études et Documents Berbères, 4, 1988, 94–102.
- Fery R., "Aurès (Le Haf)", Encyclopédie Berbère, (43), 1988, 1p.
- Galand L., "Libyque et berbère", Annuaire EPHE (IVe section), 1977–78, p. 199-212.
- Gaudry M., La femme chaouïa de l’Aurès, Étude de sociologie berbère, Paris, P. Geuthner, 1929 (texte poétique, p. 274-279).
- Hamouda N., "Les femmes rurales de l’Aurès et la production poétique", Peuples méditerranéens, 22–23, 1983, p. 267-269 (texte poétique).
- Huyghe R.P., Dictionnaire français-chaouïa (Qamūs rūmi-caui), Alger, Jourdan, 1906, 750 p.
- Huyghe R.P., Dictionnaire chaouïa-arabe-kabyle- français, Alger, 1907, 571 p.
- Joly A., Le chaouiya des Ouled Sellem, suivi d’un vocabulaire, Alger, 1912, 88 p. (Revue africaine, 1911–4, p. 441-449 et 1912–2, p. 219-266).
- Lafkioui M. & Merolla D., Contes berbères chaouis de l'Aurès d'après Gustave Mercier. Köln, Köppe, 2002.
- Maougal M., "L’arabisation des Chaouïa", Nedjma, Paris, 1, 1981, p. 20-42.
- Maougal M., "Une étude sociolinguistique en pays chaouïa", Nedjma, Paris, 6, 1984, p. 35-50.
- Masqueray, E., Comparaison d’un vocabulaire des Zenaga avec les vocabulaires correspondents des dialectes Chawia et des Beni Mzab, Paris, Imprimerie Nationale, (Archives des missions scientifiques et littéraires 3/5), 1879, p. 473-533.
- Masqueray, E., Formation des cités chez les populations sédentaires de l’Algérie. Kabyles du Djurdjura, Chaouia de l’Aourâs, Beni Mezâb. (Réed.) Aix-en-Provence, Edisud, 1886–1983, 374 p. (Archives maghrébines, CRESM) (Fac-sim. Del’éd. De Paris, Leroux, 1886).
- Masqueray, E., "Le Djebel-Chechar", Revue africaine, 22, 1878, p. 26-48, 129–145, 202–214, 259–281, 1885, p. 72-110.
- Masqueray, E., "Traditions de l’Aourâs oriental", Bulletin de Correspondance africaine, 3/185, p. 72-110.
- Masqueray, E., "Voyage dans l’Aourâs", Bulletin de la Société de Géographie, juillet 1876 (texte, p. 55-56).
- Mercier G., Cinq textes berbères en dialecte chaouïa, Paris, Imprimerie Nationale, 1900. (Journal asiatique).
- Mercier G., "Étude sur la toponymie berbère de la région de l’Aurès", Actes du XIe Congrès International des Orientalistes, Paris, 1897, sect. "Egypte et langues africaines", p. 173-207.
- Mercier G., Le chaouïa de l'Aurès (dialecte de l'Ahmar-Khaddou) (Étude grammaticale, texte en dialecte chaouïa) Paris, Publications de la Faculté des Lettres d'Alger, 1896, 326 p. (Bulletin de correspondance africaine 17).
- Mercier G., "Les noms des plantes en dialecte chaouïa de l’Aurès", XVIe Congrès International des Orienatlistes, Alger, 1905, 2/4, p. 79-92.
- Merolla D., "Il ‘Tempo di Roma’ in alcuni racconti orali dei gruppi berberofoni chaouia dell Aures (Algéria)", Studi e materiali di Storia delle religioni, 54 (12-1), 1988, p. 133-150.
- Morizot J., L’Aurès ou le mythe de la montagne rebelle, Paris, l’Harmattan, 1991, 273 p.
- Note concernant les Aoulad-Daoud du Mont-Aurès (Aourâs), Alger, A. Jourdan, 1879
- Papier A., "De l’étymologie des mots employés par les Grecs, les Romains, les Arabes pour désigner le Djebel Aurès", Revue de l’Afrique française, 1887.
- Penchoen Th.G., Étude syntaxique d'un parler berbère (Ait Frah de l'Aurès), Napoli, Istituto Universitario Orientale (Studi magrebini V), 1973, 217p.
- Plault, "Études berbères, La langue berbère dans la commune mixte de Barika", Revue africaine, 1946, p. 194-207, (vocabulaire, bovins).
- Riviere Th., "Coutumes agricoles de l’Aurès", Études et Documents berbères, 3, 1987, p. 124-152 (informations sur les documents recueillis par Th. R., Cinq textes de chansons, p. 148-152).
- Servier J., Chants de femmes de l’Aurès, Thèse complémentaire pour le doctorat des Lettres, Paris, 1995 (Inédite).
- Sierakowsky A., Das Schaui, ein Beitrag zur berberischen Sprach- und Volkskunde, Dresde, Kraszewski, 1871, 137 p.
- Sorand C., "La Fibule berbère: le type chaouïa", AWAL No.3, Paris, 1987 et CNRS: INIST 11906904
- Stricker B.H., "Compte rendu de: A. Basset, Textes berbères de l’Aurès, 1961", Kroniek van Afrika, Leyde, 1967, p. 122-125.
- Stuhlmann F., Die Kulturgeschichtlicher Ausflug in den Aures, Atlas von Süd-Algerien, Hamburg, Friederichsen, 1912, XII/205 p., ill.
- Stumme H., Arabische und berberische Dialekte, Berlin, 1928, p. 14-19.
- Tafsut (série normale, Tizi-Ouzou), 4, 1982, p. 24-28: Dihya, neγ tigγri n Wawras (Dihya, ou l’appel des Aurès), (texte berbère sur une chanteuse aurésienne).
- Vycichl W., "Un probléme de cartographie historique: Claude Ptolémée et la cartographie de la Tunisie actuelle", Polyphème (Genève), 1, 1969, 31–33. (dénominations des points cardinaux).
