= Berber music =

Musical culture of the Berber ethnic groups

Berber music (or Amazigh music) refers to the musical traditions of the Berbers, an ethnolinguistic group indigenous to North Africa who predate the arrival of Arabs in the Arab migration to the Maghreb. Berber music varies widely across North Africa. It is stylistically diverse, with songs being predominantly African rhythms and a stock of oral literature.

Ancient Berber music is stylistically rich and diverse, with styles including pentatonic music, such instruments as the oboe and the bagpipes, and African rhythms along with singing. These ancient musical traditions have been kept alive by small bands of musicians traveling from village to village, entertaining at weddings and other social events with their songs, tales and poetry.

Most Berber music is of the village-folk and urban-folk musical variety. Berber music and culture is influenced by—in addition to aesthetics and style—the Berber people's long-standing struggle to achieve basic language rights and identity recognition in modern North African societies.

== Musical/vocal styles ==
Berber music is characterized by its use of folk oral traditions, as well as particular scales and rhythmic patterns, which include pentatonic music and African rhythms. All these elements are combined to form one of the main sources of entertainment in Berber social ceremonies like marriages, as well as verses, tales and songs.

== Instrumentation ==
The Berber people are spread out over a large part of Africa, but are mostly concentrated in the northwestern region of Africa. They use a vast array of both melodic and percussive instruments. The following instruments are part of their secular and religious dance and song:

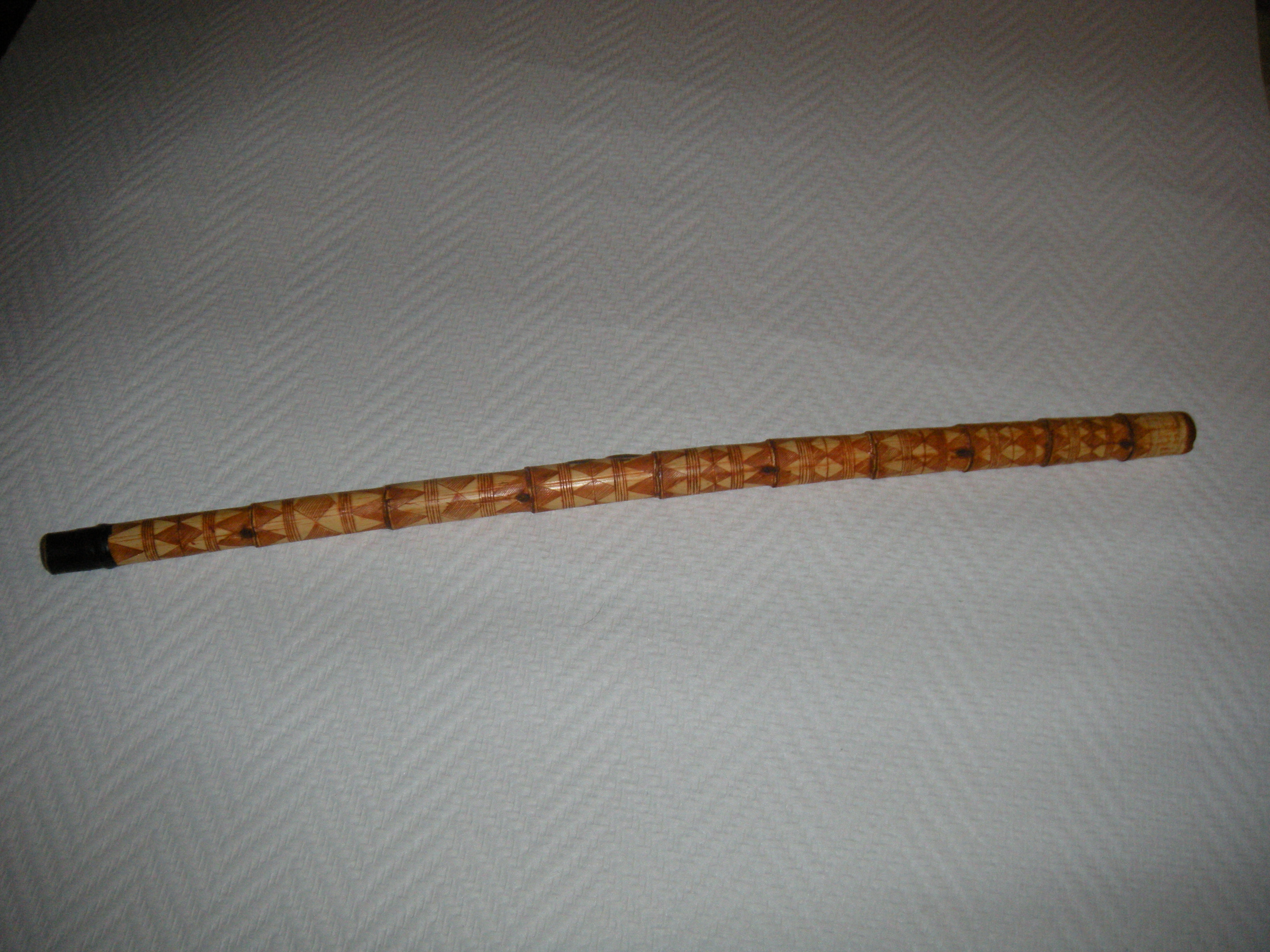
Taghanimt reed flute

- Taghanimt, an end-blown reed flute. Used mostly to accompany songs rather than dance, the taghanimt has a rich, breathy texture.
- Mizwid, a type of bagpipe; the term literally means "bag" or "food pouch".
- Zukra (Tunisia) or ghaita (Morocco). In both countries, these instruments are combined with several percussive instruments to create large ensembles which may perform at public festivals or similar occasions.
- Nafir, a long natural horn, a type of valveless trumpet. This instrument is used mostly as a signaling instrument to send out messages to large groups, although it also has some performance value.
- Ginbri (Morocco), a fretless plucked string instrument with a skin stretched over its body on the playing side: the skin has the same acoustic function as the membrane on a banjo. Most ensembles have at least one ginbri, although some have more than one.
- Rebab, a long-necked bowed instrument with a large body. Like the ginbri, it is constructed with a skin on the string side. This instrument has only one string, usually of horse hair, and is commonly played alongside the ginbri.
- Tabl (Berber languages: e'ṯbel), a cylindrical double-sided drum. Although it has a similar usage and spelling to the tabla of India, no direct connection has been found between the two. The qas'ah is a large shallow kettledrum found mostly in Tunisia. Similar to the qas'ah is the Naqqarah, two ceramic kettledrums played simultaneously by both hands.
- Bendir (Morocco and Algeria ), a snare frame-drum. A series of bendirs played simultaneously provide the main percussive rhythm for Berber music as the above-mentioned drums are more artistic than bendirs.
- Qaraqib, a large metal castanet-like musical instrument. Normally one is held in each hand. These may be used to keep a rhythm or to play their own pattern.
- Tende, a drum made with mortar and pestle.

== Algeria ==
The music of the Kabyle Berbers has achieved some mainstream success outside of its Kabylia homeland, both in the rest of Algeria and abroad. Traditional Kabyle music consists of vocalists accompanied by a rhythm section, consisting of t'bel (tambourine) and bendir (frame drum), and a melody section, consisting of a ghaita (bagpipe) and ajouag (flute).

=== Development of Kabyle music ===
In the 1930s, Kabyles moved in large numbers to Paris, where they established cafes where musicians like Cheikh Nourredine added modern, Western instruments like the banjo, guitar and violin to Kabyle folk melodies. Slimane Azem was a Kabyle immigrant who was inspired by Nourredine and 19th century poet Si Mohand Ou Mohand to address homesickness, poverty and passion in his songs, and he soon (like many Kabyle musicians) became associated with the Algerian independence movement.

By the 1950s, Arab classical music, especially Egyptian superstars like Umm Kulthum, had become popular and left a lasting influence on Kabyle music, specifically in lush orchestration. Cherif Kheddam soon arose with the advent of a Kabyle branch of Radio Algiers after independence in 1962, when France called a cease fire on 19 March and enacted the voting upon an agreement during a referendum in June. Included here were the Evian Accords which, for three years with all Algerians gave certain legal protections to colons equally. After the three years however, all Europeans would have to become Algerian citizens or risk being classified as aliens, which would then make them lose rights. Some of the rights discussed in the Accords were the right to participate in public affairs, the right to a full range of cultural and civic rights and the right to own property. Female singers also became popular during this period, especially Cherifa, Djamilla and Hanifa.

Algerian independence did not lead to increased freedom for Kabyle musicians, and these Berbers soon included often covert lyrics criticizing the Ben Bella government, which had little repercussion due to the Evian Accords. Many of these musicians were inspired by other singer-songwriters, including Joan Baez and Bob Dylan, Víctor Jara and Silvio Rodríguez. With the song "A Vava Inouva" (1973), Idir brought international attention to Kabyle music and paved the way for the Algerian raï genre. Ferhat Mehenni, known for his politically uncompromising lyrics, Lounis Ait Menguellet, known for his poetic and inspired lyrics, also became popular during the 1970s and Amour Abdenour, whose ongoing career started in 1969 wrote and performed about kabyle society, nature and more importantly love relationships.

By the time raï became popular in Europe in the 1980s, Kabyle artists were also moving towards sentimental, pop-ballads. Hassen Zermani's all-electric Takfarinas and Abdelli's work with Peter Gabriel's Real World helped bring Kabyle music to new audiences, while the murder of Matoub Lounes inspired many Kabyles to rally around their popular musicians.

Modern singers include Djur Djura and many chawi singers and groups like Houria Aichi, Les Berberes, Amirouch, Massinissa, Amadiaz, Numidas, Mihoub, Massilia, Merkunda, Thiguyer, Salim Souhali (Thaziri), Dihya, and Messaoud Nedjahi.

== Morocco ==
Traditional Moroccan Berber music can be categorised into collective and professional music.

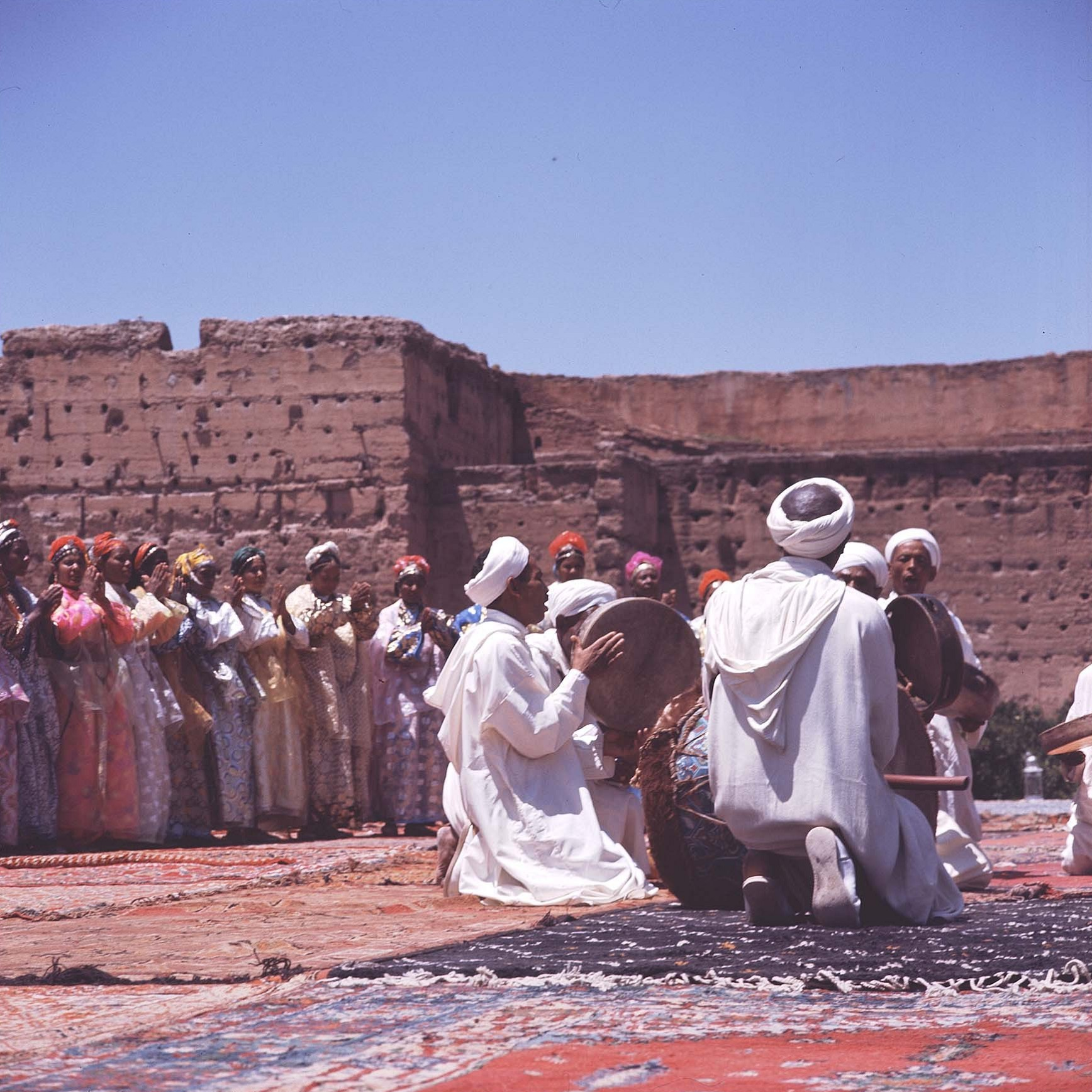
Dancers (back) and musicians (front) from Ouarzazate performing ahwash during the National Folklore Festival in Marrakesh (1970)

In collective musical performances, men and women from entire families or villages participate in communal dances such as the ahwash and ahidus. A prayer is chanted at the beginning, followed by a response from a chorus of dancers. Accompanied by drums bendir or tbel) and other percussion instruments, performers dance in two parallel rows or in a circle around the musicians.

Led by an amdyaz or poet, groups of usually four professional musicians (imdyazan) travel across the region to perform in various villages. The amdyaz recites improvised poems about current national and world affairs. His fellow musicians accompany the poem with a drum, a single-string rebab and a double clarinet.

A Shluh tradition of community music and dance is performed by the musicians and singers of the rrways style, led by a rrways or raiss. A rrways performance starts with the astara, an instrumental session on the rebab or lutar, followed by the tambourine and flute. The astara sets the basic notes of the melody. The middle section consists of sung poetry (amarg), a choreographed overture (ammussu), a lively song (tamssust), and dance (aberdag). The tabbayt marks the final part, in which the rhythm first accelerates and then ceases abruptly. In 2021, an anthology of the art of the "Rrways - a journey into the realm of Amazigh wandering poet-singers", presenting a booklet and ten compact discs with current recordings, received the ' Prix Coups de Cœur - Musiques du Monde' of the Académie Charles Cross in France.

Famous Moroccan Berber musicians include Ammouri Mbarek, a singer and songwriter active since the 1960s and considered by many Berber music enthusiasts to be the "John Lennon" of the Berbers, and Najat Aatabou, a singer whose debut cassette, "J'en ai Marre", sold an unprecedented half-million copies in Morocco. The Master Musicians of Jajouka tour internationally and have collaborated with Brian Jones of the Rolling Stones and William S. Burroughs.

Many musicians have created fusion styles from Berber and European music, including Hindi Zahra, Hassan Hakmoun, Khalid Izri, Hassan Idbasaid, Thidrin, Med Ziani, Imtlaa, Houssaine Kili, Salima Ziani, Abdelhak Akandouch and others.

== Tuaregs ==
The Berber music of the Tuareg region uses rhythms and vocal styles similar to the music of other Berber, Iberian, and Arab music, while West African call-and-response-style singing is also common. In contrast to many of the region's peoples, among the Tuareg music is mostly the domain of women, especially playing the imzhad, a string instrument like a violin. Tuareg weddings feature unique styles of music, such as women's vocal trilling and special dances (ilkan) of slaves marking the occasion.

== See also ==
- Islamic music
- Arabic music
