= Chaoui music =

Style of music in Algeria

Chaoui is a musical style of Aurès in southern Algeria. Chaoui is the French or Berber spelling of the Shawiya language. The music is sometimes called Shawiya style in English, but also as French Chaoui.

It is a mix of sahraoui (Saharan) music and marked danceable rhythms, accompanied by flute and bendir.

Notable singers include Houria Aïchi, Ali El-Khencheli, A'issa ÉI-Djermouni, Hadj Bouregaa, Teldja and Zoulikha.
