= Chaouia =

Chaouia may refer to:

- Chaouia (region), a historical and ethno-geographical region of Morocco
- Chaouia-Ouardigha, an administrative region of Morocco
- Shawiya people, a Berber ethnic group of Algeria
- Shawiya language, a Berber dialect spoken by Shawiyas

== See also ==
- Chaoui music
