= Yellow House =

Yellow House may refer to:

- The Yellow House, an 1888 painting by Vincent van Gogh
- The Yellow House (book), a 2019 memoir by Sarah M. Broom
- Yellow House (album), an album by Grizzly Bear
- Yellow House, Pennsylvania, a town in the Delaware Valley of Pennsylvania
- Yellow House Artist Collective, a collective in Sydney, Australia
- Yellow House Canyon, a canyon in west Texas
- Yellow House Draw, a dry watercourse that extends across the Llano Estacado of west Texas
- Beit Beirut or the Yellow House, a museum and urban cultural center celebrating the history of Beirut
- The Yellow House (film), a 2007 film by Amor Hakkar
- Yellow House (Venezuela), an historic building in Caracas and location of the Venezuelan Foreign Ministry
- Yellow House (red-light district), a red-light district in Incheon, South Korea
- The Yellow House (Washington, D.C.), an infamous slave jail
