= Dahiya =

Dahiya or Dahia may refer to:

- Dahiya (surname), an Indian surname
- Dahiya Khap, an Indian body representing Jats
- Dahieh, a suburb of Beirut, Lebanon
  - Dahiya doctrine, an Israeli military strategy of asymmetric warfare, which encompasses the destruction of the civilian infrastructure and endorses the employment of disproportionate force
- Dahia or Dey, an Ottoman title

== See also ==
- Dahae, an Iranian confederation
- Dihya, or Kahina, a Berber warrior queen
- Dihya (singer), Algerian singer
- Dahije, or Dahijas, renegade Janissary officers who took power in the Sanjak of Smederevo
