= Bible translations into Berber languages =

The history of Bible translation into the Berber language is fairly recent. The six major Berber language/dialects are spoken by 90% of the total Berber-speaking population: Tashelhit Berber, Kabyle Berber, Central Atlas Tamazight, Riffian Berber, Shawiya Berber, and Tuareg Berber.

== Shawiya-Berber ==
The first Bible portions in Shawiya-Berber of Algeria were translated by Charles Cook, an English Methodist missionary. He translated selected portions of the New Testament which were published by the Scripture Gift Mission in the 1930s. None are in print today. Jonah was translated in 1997 recorded as a dramatized audio cassette. The first film produced, the Jesus film, was translated and dubbed in 2002. A number of other films based on Genesis were completed in 2007. A selection of Psalms are available in print format.

- Injil Chaoui

== Tarifit Berber ==
Locally called "Tmaziɣt", Rif-Berber is so far, as of March 2014, the only Berber dialect that has the complete translations of both the New Testament and the Old Testament, available here:

- Old Testament
- New Testament

== Tashelhit Berber ==
The complete New Testament in the Berber Shilha language of South Morocco, and also a collection of twenty-five Psalms, were published in 1998 by United Bible Societies. A second edition of the New Testament is due for publication in 2010.

- Online Bible with Audio

== List of Berber translations of the Old Testament and the New Testament ==
- Old Testament - Rif-Berber
- New Testament in Rif-Berber Tamazight, in Latin script
- New Testament in Tashelhit-Berber in Latin script
- New Testament in Taqbaylit-Berber
- Gospel of Luke, translated into Central-Atlas Tamazight of Morocco
- New Testament in Tamajaq Tuareg-Berber of Ayer in Agadez, Niger
