= A Few Days of Respite =

2011 film directed by Amor Hakkar

- Directed by: Amor Hakkar
- Written by: Amor Hakkar
- Produced by: Florence Bouteloup
- Starring: Marina Vlady
- Cinematography: Nicolas Roche
- Release date: 27 April 2011 (France)
- Running time: 79 minutes
- Countries: Algeria; France
- Language: French

A Few Days of Respite (French: Quelques jours de répit) is a 2011 French-Algerian drama film written and directed by Amor Hakkar. It competed in the World Cinema section at the 2011 Sundance Film Festival.

== Cast ==
- Marina Vlady as Yolande
- Amor Hakkar as Moshen
- Samir Guesmi as Hassan
