= Zoulikha =

Algerian singer (1957–1994)

- Born: Hassina Louadj; 6 December 1957; Khenchela, Algeria
- Died: 15 November 1994 (aged 36); Kouba, Algeria
- Resting place: Khenchela
- Occupation: Singer
- Years active: 1967 - 1993
- Known for: chaoui music

Hassina Louadj (6 December 1957 – 15 November 1994), known mononymously as Zoulikha, was an Algerian singer of Chaoui music popular in the 1970s.

Like the singer Teldja, active at the same period, she revived traditional Berber songs for a new generation.
