= Amor Hakkar =

Algerian filmmaker

Amor Hakkar عمر حكار
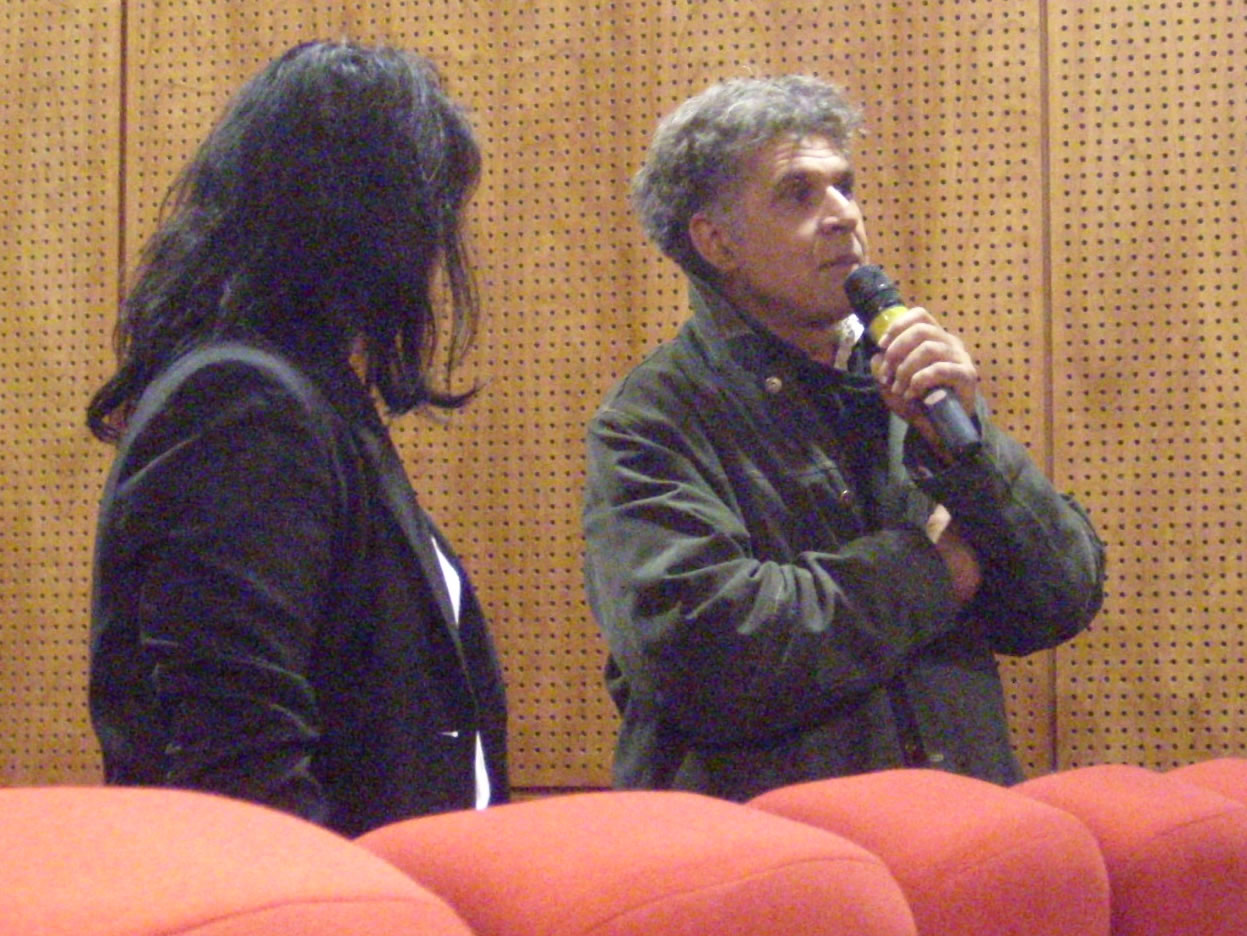
- Amor Hakkar, presenting The Yellow House at the Saint-Leu d'Amiens cinema
- Born: 1 January 1958 (age 68); Aurès, Khenchela
- Occupations: Actor, director, producer, screen writer, editor
- Years active: 1990–present
- Father: Chays Hakkar

Amor Hakkar (Arabic: عمر حكار; born 1 January 1958), is an Algerian filmmaker as well as a producer, screenwriter and actor currently active in French film industry. He owns the film production company "Sarah Films".

== Personal life ==
He was born on 1 January 1958 in mountainous village Aurès in Khenchela region of Algeria. At the age of 6 months, he arrived France with his parents. Since then, they lived in Besançon, a slum, the city of Founottes. His father Chays Hakkar influenced him to pursuing scientific studies.

== Career ==
In 1990, Hakkar directed his first short film titled Teach me to count to infinity. Then in 1992, he made the first feature film Bad Time for a Thug. It was a collaborative work with Pierre-Loup Rajot, Sylvie Fennec and Serge Giamberardino and produced by the company Rage au cœur films.

In 1994, he began filming in France and Italy the film Ailleurs c'est beau aussi with Mado Maurin and Pierre Remund. Then in 1998, Hakkar moved to his native region the Aurès to bury his father's remains, where he filmed the blockbuster television film Timgad, la vie au cœur des Aurès, a 52-minute documentary for France 5 TV. Meanwhile, in 2001, he won the Marcel Aymé Prize for the book titled La cité des fausses notes. In 2005, Hakkar created the film production company Sarah Films.

In 2008, he released the next film The Yellow House (La Maison jaune) in theaters in France and Algeria, and later in Switzerland and Canada. The film won 37 awards around the world and was critically acclaimed. The film won the Prize of the Ecumenical Jury at Locarno Film Festival as well as Special Jury award at the International Film Festival of Kerala. Then in 2010, he directed his third feature film Quelques jours de répit, which was entirely shot in Franche-Comté. It was released in France on 27 April 2011 and selected in World Cinema section at the 2011 Sundance Film Festival, becoming the only French film selected. In 2013, he made the film La Preuve within 14 days accompany with Nabil Asli and Anya Louanchi. It was distributed by his own production company, Sarah Films and the film was released in theaters in July 2014.

In 2015, he directed the film Celle qui vivra with Meryem Medjkane, Muriel Racine, Nicolas Dufour, Hichem Berdouk and Caroline Fouilhoux. The film was inspired by an original screenplay by Florence Bouteloup and the film released in theaters in 2017. In 2018, he directed the film Le Choix d'Ali.

== Filmography ==
Year	Film	Role	Note	Ref.
1990	Teach Me To Count To Infinity	Director	short film	
1992	Bad Times for a Thug (Sale temps pour un voyou)	Director	official selection at the festivals of Carthage, Tetouan and Paris	
2002	Timgad: Life at Heart in the Aurès (Timgad, la vie au cœur dans les Aurès)	Director	TVS prize at the Festival Vues d'Afrique in Montreal 2003	
2008	The Yellow House (La Maison jaune)	Director, screenwriter, editor, actor: Mouloud	Official Locarno 2007 selection	
2011	A Few Days of Respite (Quelques jours de répit)	Director, screenwriter, actor: Moshen	Official selection Sundance 2011	
2013	The Proof (La Preuve)	Director	Official Selection Dubai 2013	
2016	The One Who Will Live (Celle qui vivra)	Director		
2018	Ali's Choice (Le Choix d'Ali)	Director, producer, screenwriter		
