= Ammouri Mbarek =

Musical artist

Ammouri M'barek ⵄⵎⵎⵓⵔⵉ ⵎⴱⴰⵕⴽ
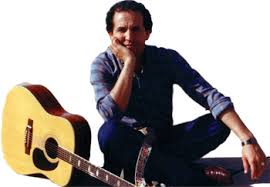

Background information
- Born: 1951; Irguiten Village, Taroudannt Province, Morocco
- Died: 14 February 2015 (aged 63–64) Casablanca
- Genres: Folk rock, soft rock, world music
- Labels: Sawt Annajah and Platinium Music
- Website: www.ammouri-mbarek.com

Ammouri M'barek (Tachelhit: ⵄⵎⵎⵓⵔⵉ ⵎⴱⴰⵕⴽ; Arabic: عموري مبارك; 1951 – 14 February 2015) was the renovator of the Moroccan Amazigh (Berber) Music, was born in 1951 in Irguiten, a small village located at the bottom of the High Atlas near Taroudannt town, in Taroudannt Province, Morocco.

== Filmography ==
Television

- biography (Usman Band, "Ousmane"), On Tifawin Program Channel 1TV RTM Morocco, (2007)
- Marrakech Express Program, On Channel 1TV RTM Morocco (2006)
- Nostalgia Program, on 2M TV local and 2M TV MONDE MOROCCO

== Discography ==
=== Albums ===
Year	Album
2015	Anaruz i Sifaw
2006	Afulki
1999	Iniyyi kra (with Ali Chouhad Archach)
1994	Azemz Irufan
1993	Manzak Inn
1992	Nsaqsa Amanar
1987	Gennevilliers
1984	Iggig N Ssif
1983	Amenzuy Gh Ujeddig
1980	Mamenk Ur Yalla
1978	Nekk Dik A Nmun
1976	Takendawt (Usman Band, Two Cassettes) and (Usman retour of 1983)
1976	Usman Band (Ousmane) 45 tours (Two Cassettes)

=== Songs ===
==== From 1978 Album - Nekk Dik A Nmun ====
Track Listing	Song
1	"Nik Dik"`
2	"Taghlaghal"
3	"Isksiten"
4	"Wayahou"
5	"Ourti Nlouz"
6	"Izwa Ifri"
7	"Amtta Oul"

==== From 2006 Album - Afulki ====
Track Listing	Song
1	"Manzak A Yan Igh D Isawel"
2	"Ifis"
3	"Amudd Irwan"
4	"Amarg N Ddunit"
5	"Ajeddig N Tayri"
6	"Anhattaf"
7	"Manzak A Yan Igh D Isawel" (Instrumental)

== Concerts ==
2006

- Amazigh-Berber Festival in Las Palmas, Canary Islands. (2006)
- Opening the festival Timitar in Agadir, Morocco. (2006) Watch, the Live performance. Excellent video by Festivaltimitar Mamenk ur Yalla Timitar 2006
- Release of his latest album Afulki (2006)

2008

- Imeâchar Festival of Tiznit. (2008)

2009

- Awtar Festival in March (2009)

2010

- Festival in la cote d'Agadir -August 2010
- Amazigh Great Evening (at The Mohammed V Sports Complex) in Casablanca - August 2010
- Festival Imezwag in Imi n Tanoute - July 2010
- Festival Igoudar in Idaougnidif - July 2010 -
- 6th Edition of the Amazigh Culture Festival in Fes - July 2010
- Iklan Festival in Ouarzazate ( Hommage à Ammouri Mbarek) - April 2010
