= M'Chouneche District =

Coordinates: 34°57′N 6°00′E

- District
- Country: Algeria
- Province: Biskra Province
- Time zone: UTC+1 (CET)

M'Chouneche District is a district of Biskra Province, Algeria.

== Municipalities ==
The district has 1 municipality:

- M'Chouneche
