= Houria Aïchi =

Algerian Berber singer of chaoui music

Houria Aïchi ⵃⵓⵔⵉⴰ ⴰⵢⵛⵉ
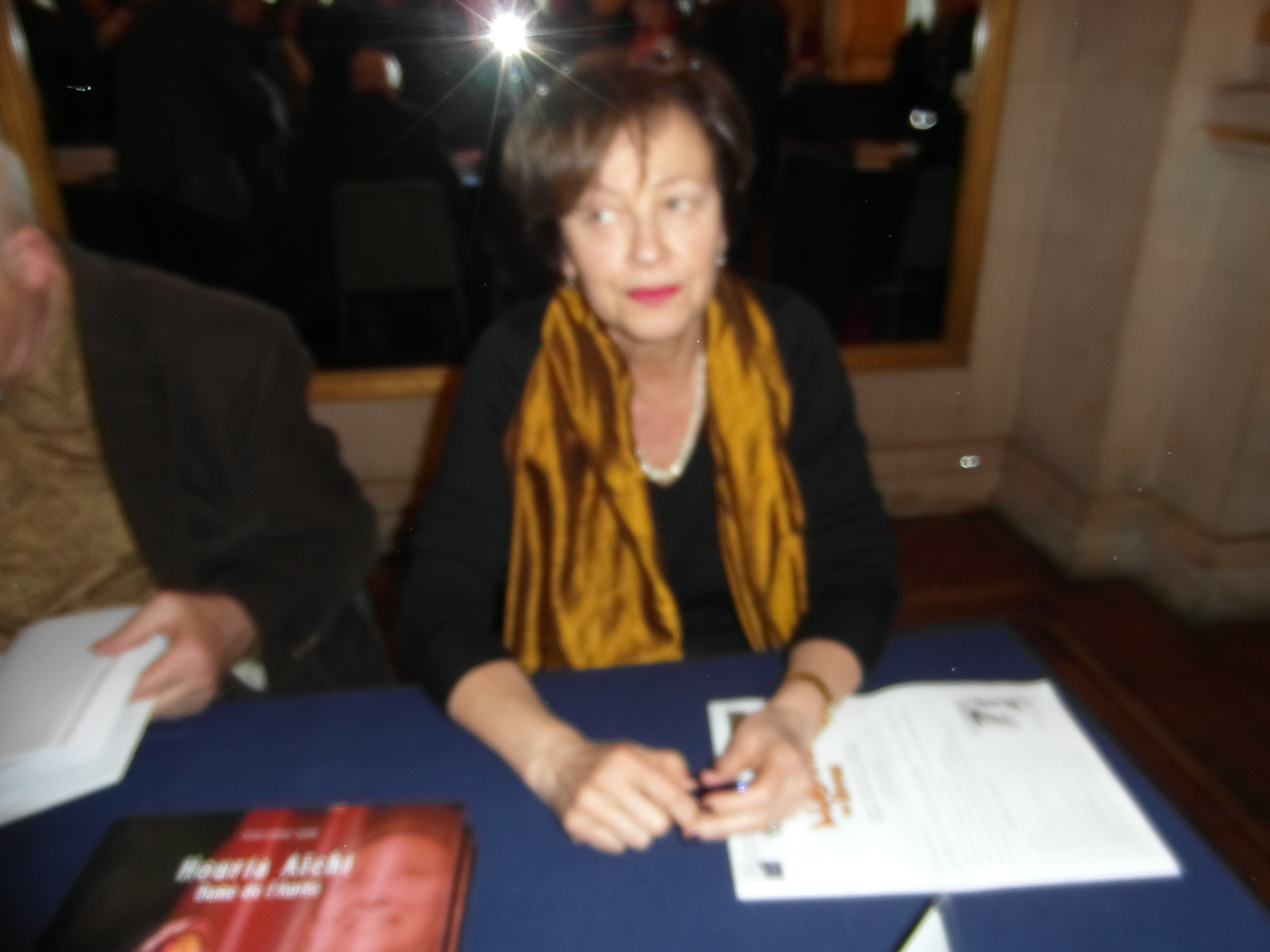
- Houria Aïchi at the 20th Maghreb des livres (Paris, February 8, 2014).

Background information
- Born: Batna, Algeria
- Occupation: singer
- Years active: 1985–present

Houria Aïchi (born in Batna) is an Algerian Berber singer of chaoui music. Aïchi sings songs that she learnt in her childhood, accompanied by bendir.

== Biography ==
Born in Aurès, Houria Aïchi went to study psychology in Paris in the 1970s. While teaching sociology, she started to perform in 1985, singing traditional songs of her childhood (lullabies, love songs), accompanied by traditional instruments (gasbâ, bendir), Her first two released albums did not open doors.

Houria Aïchi also participated in the music for the film The Sheltering Sky by Bernardo Bertolucci (1990). Her third album, Khalwa (meaning A Mystical Retreat) was a collaboration with Henri Agnel which was devoted to the sacred songs of Algeria, including those of dhikr and soufi.

Houria Aïchi performed both in 2008 and 2013 at the festival Au fil des voix (fr). She performed regularly in Paris from the 1990s. After the winter season of 2017–18 in France, Houria Aïchi was invited to the "Festival Salam Orient" on October 21, 2019, in Vienna. (Note: Concert in December 7, 2018 at Musée de la Castre(in French), Cannes, which was followed by an appearance on January 19, 2019 at the Musée du Quai Branly, Paris.)

== Discography ==
- Chants De L'aurés (1990, Auvidis – Naïve (Note: Album Chants De L'aurés has: 1. Louange au Prophète; 2. Elle Sort du Bain; 3. Chants de Partisans; 4. Salah; 5. Fille des Aïth-Abdi; 6. Fontaine Dis-Moi; 7. Gloire aux Chaouis; 8. Soussem; 9. Médisance; 10. Berceuse; 11. Fuite; 12. Amants; 13. Mes Frères))
- Hawa (1996, Auvidis) (Note: Album Hawa has; 1. Berceuse; 2. Jamila; 3. Keira; 4. Le Cavalier; 5. Le Desir; 6. L'Epopee De Messaoud; 7. Mon Ame Est en Peine; 8. Said; 9. Vent De La Montagne-Six Sous; 10. Vie Noivelle)
- Khalwa, chants sacrés de l'Algérie (2001, Virgin Classics) (Note: Album Khalwa, chants sacrés de l'Algérie has; 1. Mewlana; 2. La Ellaha Illalah (Il n'y a de Dieu que Dieu); 3. Khalwa (La retraite spirituelle); 4. El Houjjah ('les pèlerins); 5. Khaounia (l'adepte): Khaounia Rabbania; 6. Khaounia (l'adepte): Khaounia Mouradia; 7. Khaounia (l'adepte): Khaounia El Faidhane; 8. Khaounia (l'adepte): Ahelill; 9. Khaounia (l'adepte): El Hachemi; 10. Khaounia (l'adepte): Atsaligh (Que la priere divine soit sur lr Prophete); 11. Sidi Slimane: Sidi Slimane Arraja; 12. Sidi Slimane: Sidi Slimane El Koubba; 13. Sidi Slimane: Sidi Slimane Akissaouma; 14. Sidi Slimane: Sidi Slimane El Wahid)
  - Houria Aïchi & Henri Agnel.
- Chants Sacrés d'Algérie (Sacred Songs from Algeria) (2005, Angel Records)
- Songs of the Aures – Arabic Berber Songs by Houria Aichi (2006, NAIVE WORLD)
- Renayate (2013, Harmonia Mundi)
- Chants Mystiques D'algeri (2017 NAIVE WORLD)

Houria Aïchi & l'Hijâz'Car

- Les Cavaliers de l'Aurès (Riders of the Aurès) (2008 agreements with Harmonia Mundi) (Note: On album Les Cavaliers de l'Aurès (Riders of the Aurès) and live recordings performed with; Houria Aichi : singing, Mohamed Abdennour: mandol, Ali Bensadoun : flutes, and Adhil Mirghani : percussion. Songs on the albums are: 1. Le cavalier, le cheval et la dame; 2. Invocation; 3. Rencontre amoureuse; 4. Les 6 bonbons; 5. La jument grise; 6. Les cavaliers; 7. Mélancolie; 8. Les messager)

Compilation

- The Rough Guide to the Music of North Africa (1997, World Music Network)
