= The Yellow House (film) =

La Maison jaune
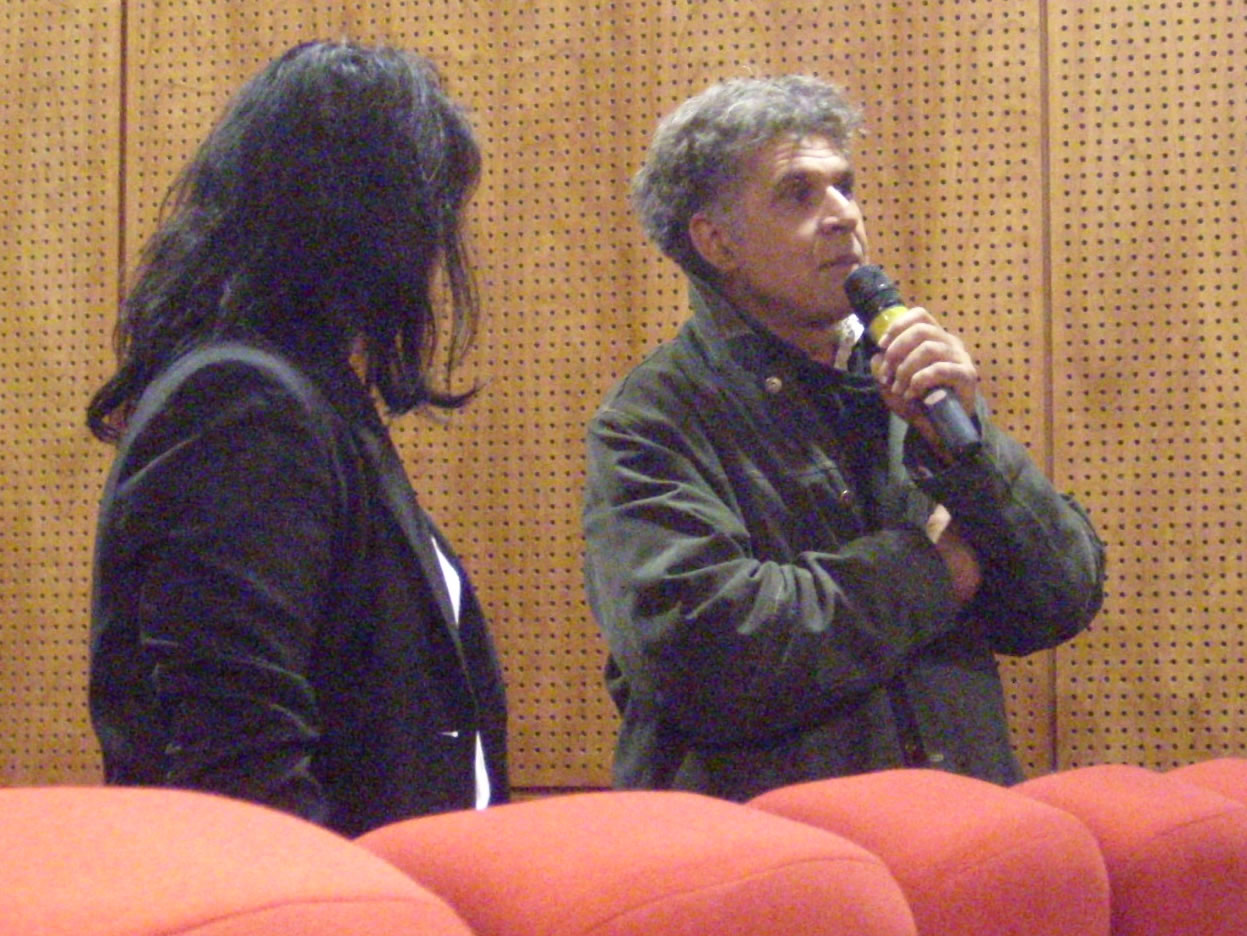
- Amor Hakkar, presenting The Yellow House at the Saint-Leu d'Amiens cinema
- Directed by: Amor Hakkar
- Screenplay by: Amor Hakkar
- Produced by: Sarah Films
- Starring: Alya Hamdi, Amor Hakkar, Tounés Ait-Ali
- Cinematography: Nicolas Roche
- Edited by: Lyonnel Garnier
- Music by: Aurélien Dudon, Fayçal Salhi, Joseph Macera, Alya Hamdi
- Release date: 2007
- Running time: 83 minutes
- Countries: Algeria; France

The Yellow House (French: La Maison jaune) is a 2007 Algerian film.

== Synopsis ==
In Algeria, in the arid mountainous landscapes of the Aurès, a family learns from the police that their eldest son Belkacem has died in an accident, while doing his military service. On hearing the news, Mouloud immediately sets off to the city on his old tractor to retrieve his son's body, wishing to give him a decent burial. Mouloud's journey is plagued by suffering and loneliness. On his return, he realizes that his wife Fatima is grieving deeply. Fearing that she will never feel happy again, Mouloud tries everything to make her smile, refusing to give up because, like all the peasants in the hostile lands of the Aurès, he knows that "To give up is to die a little...".

== Awards ==
- Locarno 2007
- Valencia 2007
