= Mohamed Demagh =

Algerian sculptor (1930–2018)

- Born: July 4, 1930; Batna
- Died: August 16, 2018 (aged 88)
- Occupation: Sculptor

Mohamed Demagh (4th July, 1930 – 16th August, 2018) was an Algerian sculptor.

== Biography ==
During the Algerian War Mohamed Demagh survived a bombing of French aviation in the maquis in Aures under the command of Abdelhamid Boudiaf (not to be confused with Mohammed Boudiaf) where 35 of his companions perished. He refused to participate in the First Indochina War.

Mohamed Demagh began his artistic career in 1966. He has presented several solo exhibitions and participated in mass demonstrations in Algeria (1972, 1974, 1983, 1992).

After September 11 attacks, in memory of the victims, he created a piece of debris from bombs dating from the Algerian War.

A retrospective of the artist's life was produced by the Algerian television during the 1980s.
