= Khalid Izri =

Musical artist

Khalid Izri خالد إزري
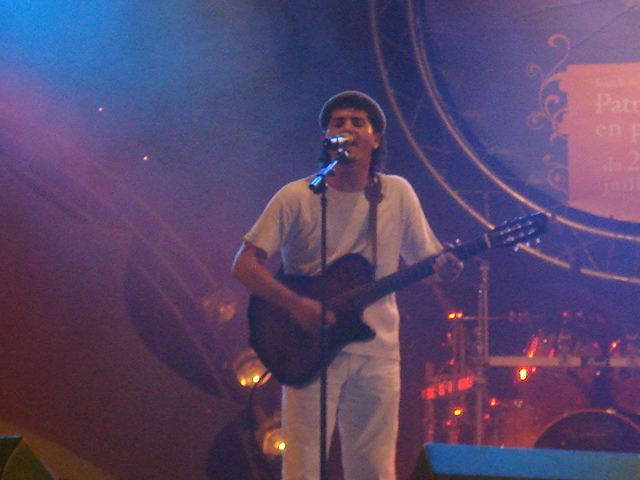

Background information
- Born: Khalid Yachou ⵅⴰⵍⵉⴷ ⵢⴰⵛⵓ; 1969 (age 56–57); Melilla, Spain
- Years active: 1988–present

Khalid Izri (born Khalid Yachou in 1969) is a Riffian artist who sings in the Riffian language. He has performed in different locations of the globe, including Europe and the USA. He plays a variety of instruments, including the guitar, flute and harmonica.

== Albums ==
- Tamath inu - ⵜⴰⵎⴰⵝ ⵉⵏⵓ (my land)
- Izri inu - ⵉⵣⵔⵉ ⵉⵏⵓ (my song)
- Mayemmi - ⵎⴰⵢⴻⵎⵎⵉ (why)
- Taqessist - ⵜⴰⵇⴻⵙⵉⵙⵜ (The story)
