= Dihya (singer) =

Algerian singer of Chaoui music

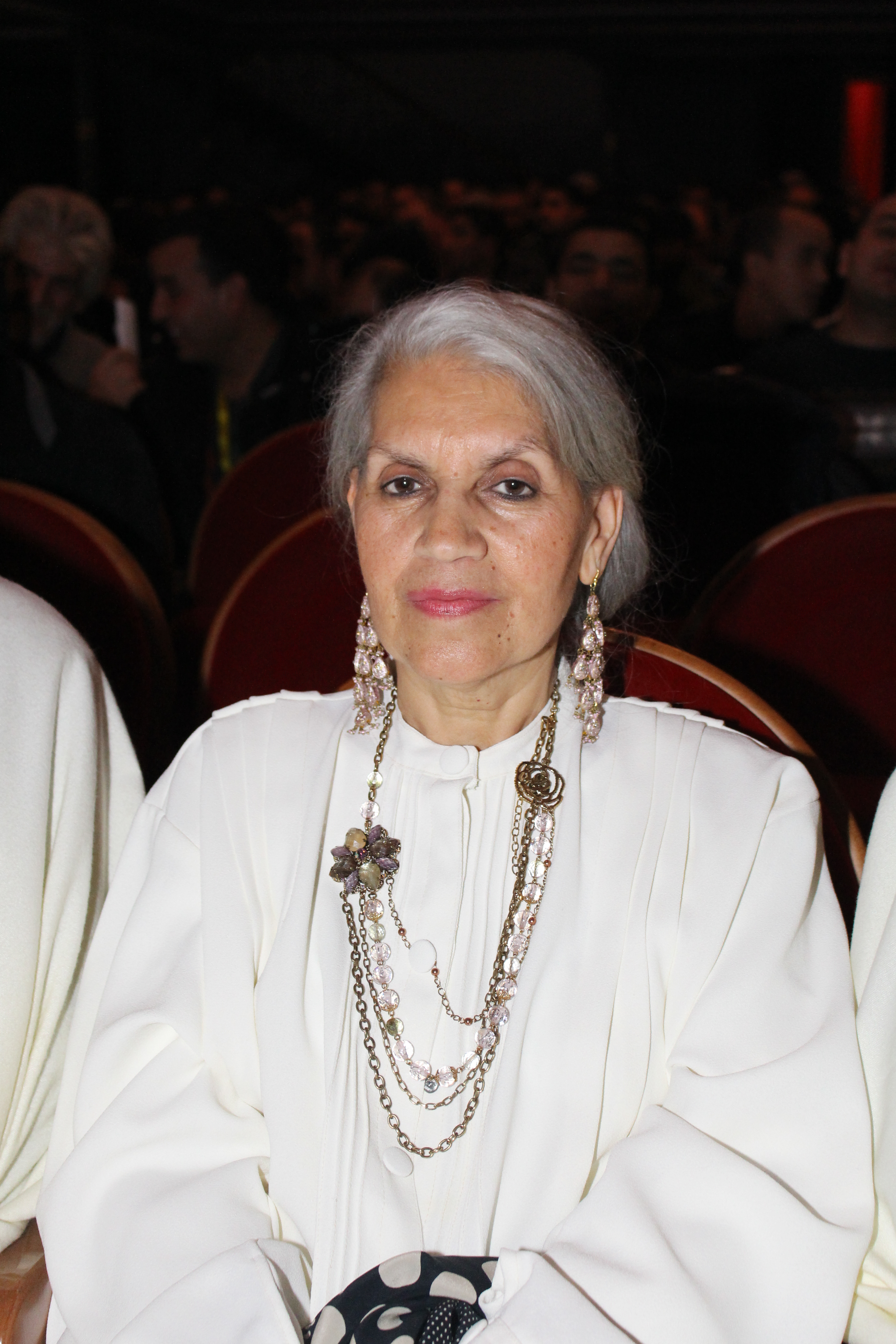
Dihya in 2014

Dihya (real name Zohra Aïssaoui) is an Algerian singer of Chaoui music.

== Early life ==
Dihya was born in 1950 the village of Taghit near Tighanimine to Amar Aïssaoui Taghit and Ourida Meghamri of T'kout. She moved to France in 1958 at the age of eight.

== Discography ==
- Badala Zamana (1977)
- Ekker d! Ekker d! (1981)
- Usin d! Usin d! (1982)
- Setta Frank (1987)
- Dzaïr essa (2005)
