= Cherif Merzouki =

Algerian painter (1951–1991)

- Born: 1951 (age 74–75); Amentan, Menaa, Aurès
- Died: 1991
- Occupation: Painter

Cherif Merzouki or Cherif Merzougui or Merzogui (February 8, 1951 Amentan, Menaa, Aurès - April 4, 1991 Aurès ) was a painter and Illustrator.

== Sources ==
- ""Aurès, vivre la terre chaouie" : Un livre-reportage sur des hommes, des lieux et des métiers". www.elmoudjahid.com (in French).
