= Yellow House (red-light district) =

Former red-light district in South Korea

Coordinates: 37.463239°N 126.650968°E

Yellow House (Korean: 옐로우 하우스) is the name of a former red-light district in Sungui-dong, Michuhol District, Incheon, South Korea. The area had been a center for sex work in the area since March 1962. Before this, the first brothel in the city was a 1902 establishment Budo Yugak, which was ultimately moved to the Yellow House district during the Park Chung Hee administration. Beginning in 2008, the local government put significant effort in dismantling the district. By 2021, the last brothel had been demolished.

== History ==
A predecessor brothel to the area, called Budo Yugak (부도 유곽; 敷島遊廓) was founded in 1902 in Sinheung-dong, Jung District. 17 restaurants invested 800 yen each to found the establishment. The clients were primarily Japanese. The brothel continued operating until after Park Chung Hee seized power in the May 16 coup. His military government took steps to relocate the various brothels in the city elsewhere, with Sungui-dong being one of the destinations. To support this effort, the city government provided brothels with loans for relocation expenses. The relocations were completed by March 1962, and a market was built in the place of the original brothel.

In the 1960s, around 10 brothels existed in the district. This number grew to 30 after the 1980s. By 2008, there were 25 establishments with 120 employees. On October 13, 2008, the area was targeted for redevelopment. On September 20, 2010, a project was approved to demolish and redevelop the area. However, plans stalled due to a real estate recession that occurred around that time. The efforts were made a local housing association project in 2015. In 2016, the city government requested that business owners tint their glass to minimize display of their services to passersby. Land purchases and compensation of owners was completed by October 2018, However, there were 16 establishments with 70 employees operating by that point. Buildings were set to be demolished by that year, with a new apartment scheduled to be constructed in the first half of 2019, and move-ins scheduled for 2022. A counseling center for sex workers exists in the district. By 2020, it was the last red-light district in the city.

In 2020, various sex workers seeking compensation for the loss of their livelihood lost a lawsuit, on the grounds that they had just rented rooms from a building and were not owners of the establishment. By this point, only four establishments remained. Plans had once existed to allocate funds to assist the sex workers in finding other forms of work, but these were highly controversial. They were ultimately rejected on December 21, 2021. A district official provided the justification that, by this point, all brothels had been demolished, so that there was no point in paying compensation to the former sex workers.

Each business in the district had once been numbered from 1 to 33, although the numbers 4, 14, and 24 were avoided for superstitious reasons.
