= Abdelkhader Houamel =

Algerian painter (1936–2018)

Abdelkader Houamel
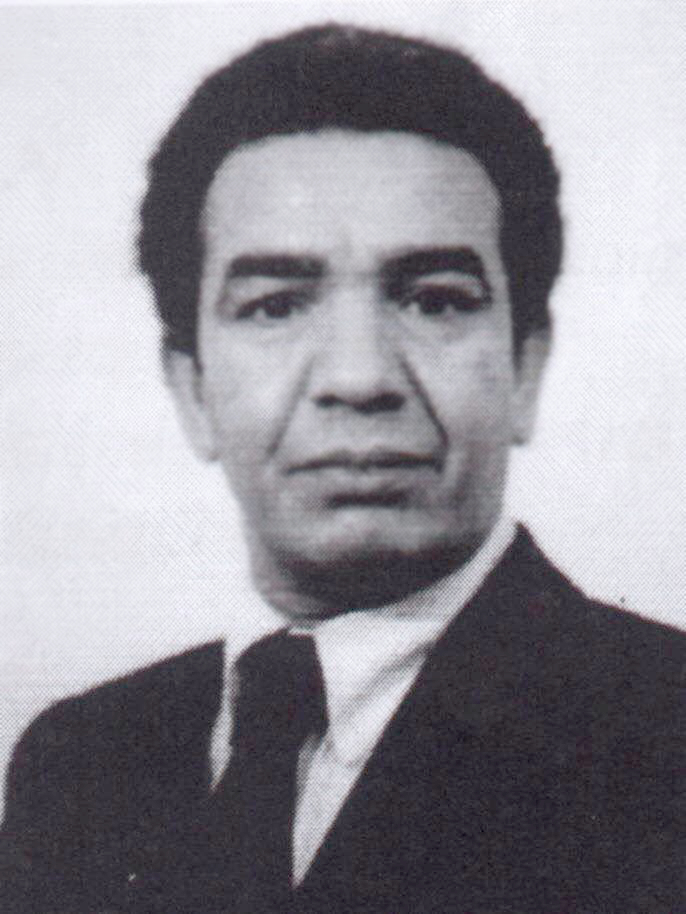

Personal details
- Born: August 17, 1936 N'Gaous
- Died: July 11, 2018 (aged 81) Rome
- Occupation: Painter

Abdelkhader Houamel (August 17, 1936 – July 11, 2018) was an Algerian painter. Born in N'Gaous, he is considered to be among the founders of contemporary Algerian painting.

Between 1955 and 1960, Abdelkhader Houamel was an active member of the National Liberation Front as part of his socialist and anti-colonialist beliefs. In 1960, Houamei's work was featured in its first solo exhibition, at the Salon des Arts in Tunis. Following that he began studying at the Academy of Fine Arts in Rome. In 1963, he received a gold medal in Arabian art, and since 1967 he has been the subject of several international exhibitions. In 1972, Houamei was decorated by Former President of Algeria, Houari Boumedienne. He lived in Italy since 1960.

== Bibliography ==
- Mohammed Hardi, Benjamin Stora, La Guerre d'Algérie, édition Robert Laffont, Paris, 2004
- Dario Micacchi, Galleria La Nuova Pesa. Roma.
- Title Abdelkader Houamel (Mostra A Roma), Renato Guttuso, Palazzo Barberini, cat d'Arte, 1982.
- D.Micacchi, presentazione in cartella di 5 litografie a colori Algérie Algérienne, Ed. Cantini.
- La personale di Houamel Abdelkader : Bottega dei Crociferi, Roma, cat Della mostra., 1962
