= M'Chouneche =

Coordinates: 34°57′N 6°00′E

M'chouneche Himsounine
- Commune, sous prefecture and town
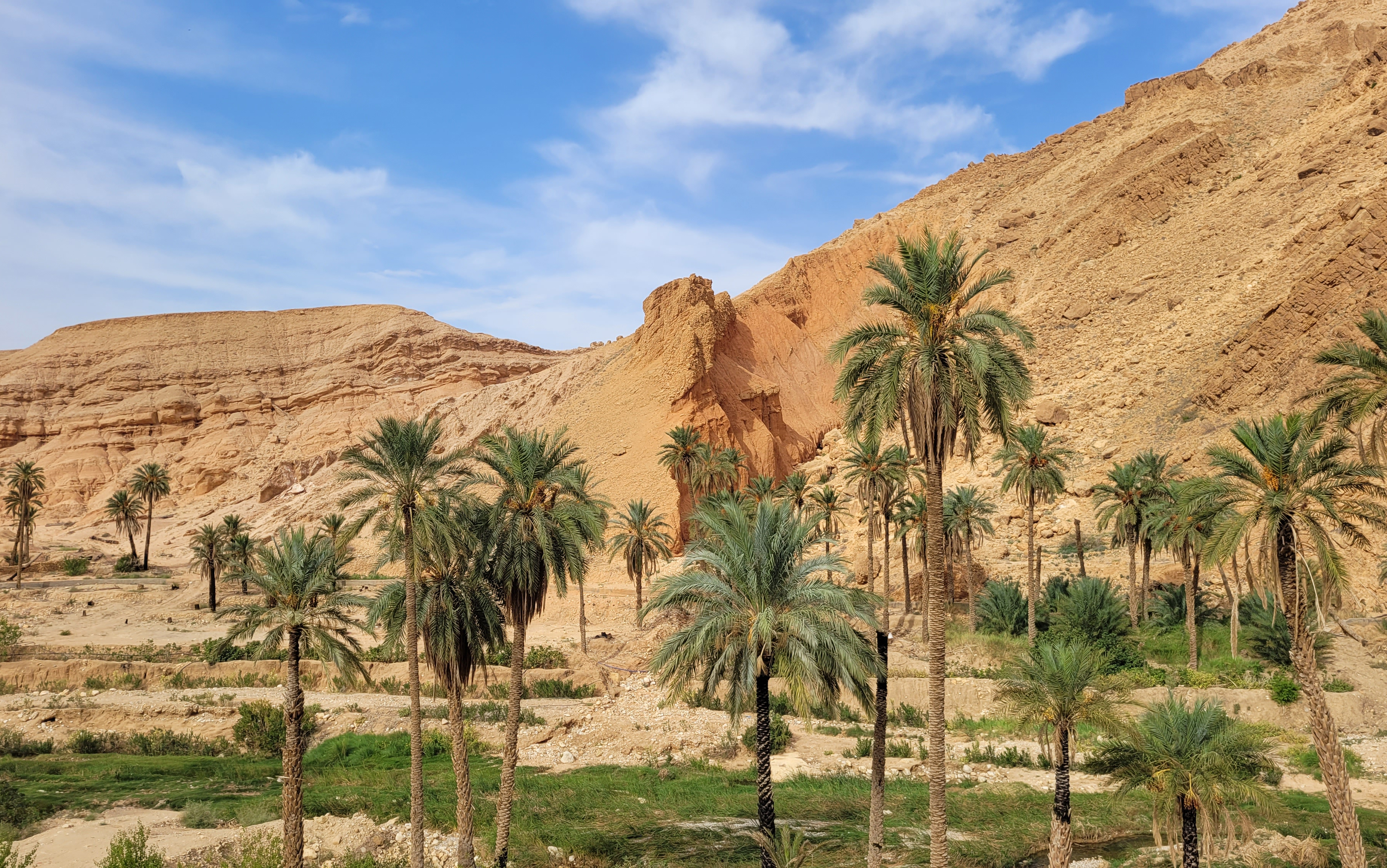
- M'Chouneche natural park

- Country: Algeria
- Province: Biskra Province
- District: M'Chouneche District

Area
  - Total: 195.72 sq mi (506.92 km^{2})

Population (2008)
  - Total: 10,107
- Time zone: UTC+1 (CET)

M'Chouneche is a town and commune in Biskra Province, Algeria.

It is located in the northeast of the country, in the Aurès region, about 400 km (250 mi) from Algiers, 115 km (71 mi) from Batna and 220 km (140 mi) from Touggourt.
