= Aïssa Djermouni =

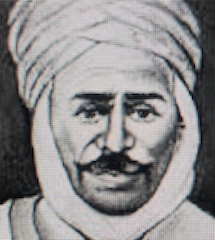

Aïssa Djermouni or Aïssa El Jermouni or Aissa Merzougui or Aïssa L'Jarmouni (1886–1946) was an Algerian poet and a singer of Berber origin.

== Biography ==
Aïssa Djermouni was born in M'toussa (Kenchela) in 1886. Merzoug came from the great Berber tribal federation Aïth Kerkath (H'rakta in Arabic) occupying the geographical space between Batna, Khenchela and Aïn Beïda in the South Constantinois; the branch to which he belongs is Igerman, hence his name Jermouni (arabized form). He is of peasant origin. His impresario was a native Jew, Mr. Snoussi, who introduced him to record companies such as Philips, Ouardaphone, etc. from the early thirties.

== Sources ==
- Book, Ounissi. Mohamed. Salah : Aïssa L'Jarmouni, champion de la chanson aurésienne, ANEP, Rouiba, 2000, Algeria.
- Book, La culture africiane: le symposium d'Alger, 21 juillet-1er août 1969, Société nationale d'édition et de diffusion, 1969.

== Sources ==
- Encyclopédie berbere in ligne (in French)
- book google inligne
