= Ali Khencheli =

Algerian singer (1919–2004)

- Born: Khenchela, Algeria
- Other names: Mahmoud Djellal
- Occupation: Musician
- Years active: 1940–1960

Ali Khencheli or Mahmoud Djellal (born at Khenchela) was an Algerian musician of Berber origin. He sang from 1940 to 1960. He died at 88 years.

== Sources ==
- New Soir and Djazairess
- biography (in French)
- book google short biography in English
- Auresienne Kahina
