= Shawiya language =

Zenati Berber language spoken in Algeria

Shawiya
- Chaouïa
- Tacawit / ⵝⴰⵛⴰⵡⵉⵝ
- Pronunciation: [θæʃæwiθ]
- Native to: Algeria
- Region: Aurès Mountains, provinces of Constantine, Mila and Guelma
- Ethnicity: Chaouis
- Native speakers: 2.6 million (2022)
- Language family: Afro-Asiatic: Berber; Northern; Zenati; Shawiya
- Dialects: Bellezma; Boutaleb; High plains Nemencha; Central Aurès
- Writing system: Latin script; Tifinagh

Official status
- Official language in: Algeria (as a variant of Tamazight)
- Regulated by: HCA

Language codes
- ISO 639-3: shy
- Glottolog: tach1249
- IETF: shy
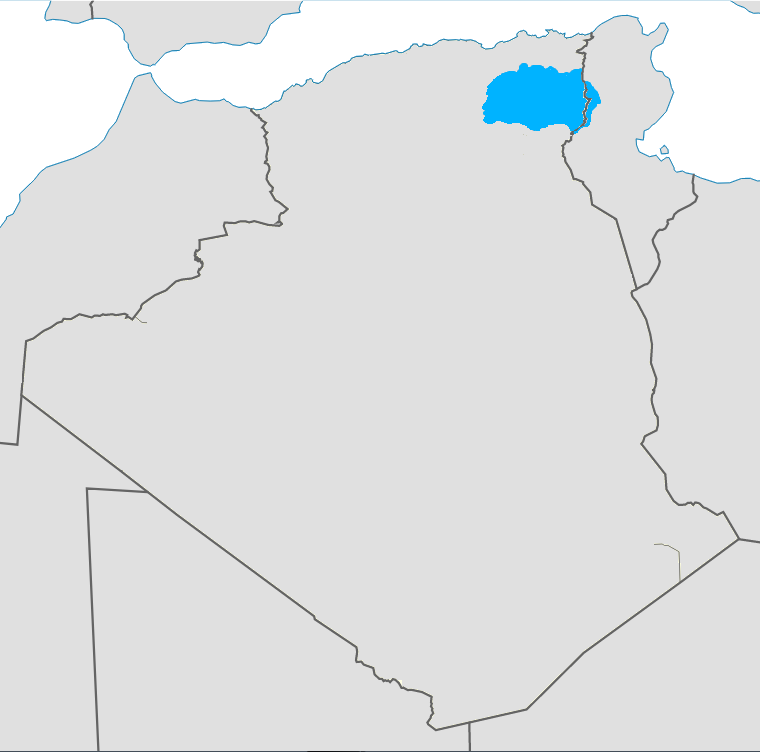
- Distribution of Shawiya speakers.

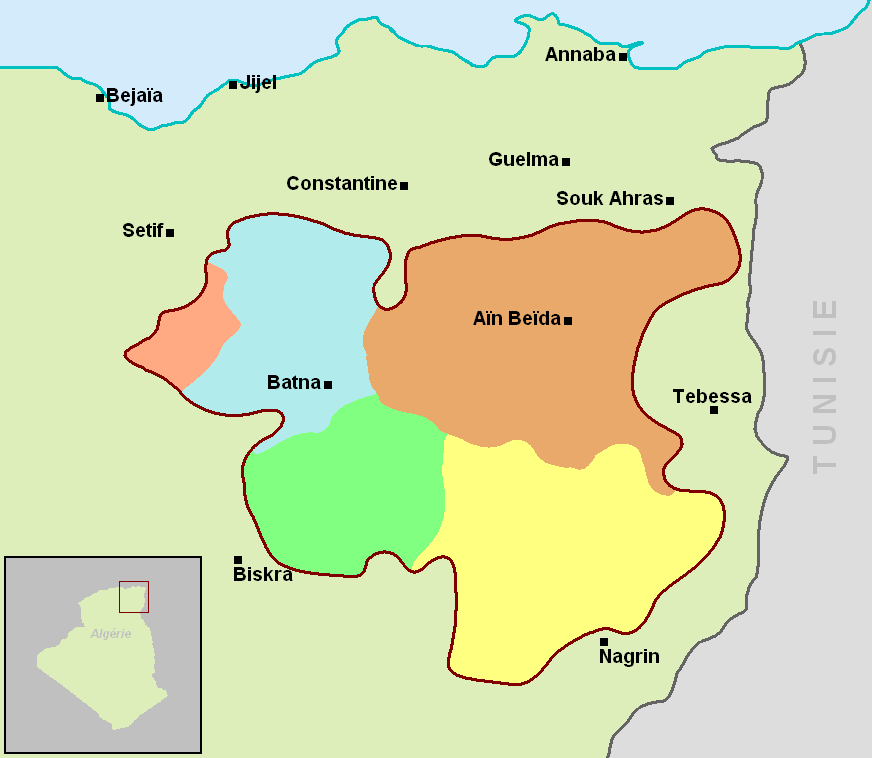
- Geographic distribution of Shawiya dialects in northeastern Algeria.

Shawiya, or Shawiya Berber, also spelt Chaouïa (native form: Tacawit [θæʃæwiθ]), is a Zenati Berber language from the Afroasiatic language family spoken in Algeria by the Shawiya people. The language's primary speech area is the Awras Mountains and in the surrounding regions in eastern Algeria, including Batna, Khenchela, Sétif, Oum El Bouaghi, Souk Ahras, Tébessa, Biskra, Guelma, Mila and Constantine. It is closely related to the Shenwa language of Central Algeria.

== Language ==
The Shawiya people call their language Tacawit (Thashawith) ([θʃæwɪθ] or [hʃæwɪθ]). Estimates of number of speakers range from 1.4 to 3 million speakers.

The French spelling of Chaouïa is commonly seen, due to the influence of French conventions on Algeria. Other spellings are "Chaoui", "Shawia", "Tachawit", "Thachawith", "Tachaouith" and "Thchèwith". In Shawiya, the leading /t/ – pronounced [θ] in that phonetic environment – is often reduced to an /h/, so the native name is often heard as Hašawiθ.

Shawiya Berber was, until recently, an unwritten language and rarely taught at school. As the Shawiya people were predominantly rural and secluded, they often code-switch to Algerian Arabic, French or even English to discuss non-traditional technology and sociological concerns.

Recently, the Shawiya language, together with the Kabyle language, has begun to achieve some cultural and media prominence thanks to the Berber cultural and political movements in Algeria and to the introduction of Berber language education in some public schools.

== Phonology ==
=== Vowels ===
	Front	Central	Back
High	i		u
Mid		ə	
Low		a	

- /i, a, u/ can also be laxed as [ɪ, æ, ʊ].

=== Consonants ===
		Labial	Dental		Alveolar		Palato- alveolar	Palatal		Velar		Uvular	Pharyn- geal	Glottal
		Labial	plain	phar.	plain	phar.	Palato- alveolar	plain	lab.	plain	lab.	Uvular	Pharyn- geal	Glottal
Nasal		m			n			(nʲ)			(nʷ)			
Plosive	voiceless		(t̪)	t̪ˤ			tʃ			(k)	kʷ	q		
Plosive	voiced	(b)	(d̪)	(d̪ˤ)			dʒ			(ɡ)	(ɡʷ)			
Fricative	voiceless	f	θ	θˤ	s	sˤ	ʃ	ç	(çᶣ)	x			ħ	h
Fricative	voiced	β	ð	ðˤ	z	zˤ	ʒ	ʝ	(ʝᶣ)			ʁ	ʕ	
Trill					r	rˤ								
Approximant					l			j			w			

- All consonants are geminated in tense positions. The tense equivalents of the spirants /β, θ, ð, θˤ/ðˤ, ç, ʝ, j, w/ are the plosives [bː, t̪ː, d̪ː, t̪ːˤ/d̪ːˁ, kː, qː, ɡː, ɡːʷ]. Simple [b, t̪, d̪, d̪ˁ, k, ɡʷ] do not occur phonemically, and simple [ɡ] is apparently uncommon.
- Sounds [nʲ, nʷ] are only heard when /n/ precedes semivowels /j, w/.
- Sounds /çᶣ, ʝᶣ, ɡʷ/ are only heard when in tense positions.

== Bibliography ==
- Abouba, K., Morphologie nominale du Chaoui, Montréal, Université de Montréal, (1993), [Thèse].
- Aïchi, H., «La tradition de la poésie populaire chantée des Chaouias d’Algérie», Horizons maghrébiens, 20–21, Toulouse, (1993), p. 176-178.
- Amaghestan, Y., Th'chèwith: Racines de la mémoire: Mémoire des racines, Auto-édition, (2004).
- Basset, A., Atlas linguistique des parlers berbères, Alger, Institut d'Études Orientales, (1936 et 1939), [+ cartes].
- Basset, A., «Berbère isnin (tous les deux)», Comptes Rendus du Groupe Linguistique d’Études Chamito-Sémitique, 4, Paris, (1946), p. 19-20.
- Basset, A., De nouveau à propos du nom de l’île de fer (Canaries); sur la toponymie berbère et spécialement sur la toponymie chaouia des Ait Frah (Département de Constantine), Paris, Lyon, (1948).
- Basset, A., «La mise à part. Faits berbères», Comptes Rendus du Groupe Linguistique d’Études Chamito-Sémitique, 4, Paris, (1946), p. 65-66.
- Basset, A., «Présentation de cartes linguistiques berbères», Comptes Rendus du Groupe Linguistique d’Études Chamito-Sémitiques, 1–2, Paris, (1934/1937), p. 42 et p. 81-82.
- Basset, A., «Sur la proposition indépendante et la proposition relative en berbère», Comptes Rendus du Groupe Linguistique d’Études Chamito-Sémitique, 4, Paris, (1945/1948), p. 30-32, [Examples pris dans le parler des Aït Frah].
- Basset, A., «Sur la toponymie berbère et spécialement sur la toponymie chaouïa Aït Frah», Onomastica, 2, PubLg: Français, (1948), p. 123-126.
- Basset, A., Textes berbères de l'Aurès (parler des Aït Frah), Paris, Publ. de l'Institut d'Etudes Orientales, (1961).
- Basset, A., « Un faux arabisme en berbère », Comptes Rendus du Groupe Linguistique d’Études Chamito-Sémitique, 4, Paris, (1948/1951), p. 63-64. [Nom de la "laine"; ḍḍuft < taḍuft, dans le parler berbère des Aït Frah].
- Basset, R., Loqmân berbère..., Paris, Leroux, (1890), [15 textes de l’Aurès].
- Basset, R., «Notice sur le chaouïa de la province de Constantine (Sedrata)», Journal Asiatique, Paris, (1896), 36p.
- Basset, R., «Notice sur les dialectes berbères des Harakta et du Djerid tunisien», Actes du Congrès International des Orientalistes, 9, Paris, (1896), 18 p.
- Basset, R., «Nouvelles enquêtes en Mauritanie, dans le Contantinois et dans les ksours oranais et marocains», Journal Asiatique, 9:8, Paris, (1896), p. 361-394.
- Boughuida, B.K., Bibliographie sur l’Aurès de 1830 à 1880, Constantine, Univ. de Constantine, 103 p. [2cartes, p. 760, réf. Bibl.:Mémoire de Licence Institut de Bibliothéconomie Univ. de Constantine].
- Boulhaïs, N., «Recherches sur l'Aurès, bibliographie ordonnée», Études et Documents Berbères, 15–16, Paris, (1998), p. 284-312.
- Camps-Faber, H., Bijoux berbères d’Algérie. Grande-Kabylie et Aurès, Aix-en Provence, Edisud, (1990), 146 p., ill. [Lexique chaoui-français].
- Cantineau, J., «Les parlers arabes du Département de Constantine », Actes du Congrès de la Fédération des Sociétés Savantes de l’Afrique du Nord, 4, Alger, (1939), t. 2, p. 849-863, [Contacts arabe/berbère et substrat berbère].
- Chaker, S., «Chaoui/Chaouia (linguistique/littérature)», Encyclopédie berbère, xii, Aix-en-Provence, Edisud, (1993), p. 1875-1877.
- Chaker, S., «Aurès (linguistique)», Encyclopédie berbère, viii, Aix-en-Provence, Edisud, (1989–90), p. 1162-1169 et (1993), p. 1875-1877.
- Colonna, F., «Discours sur le nom : identité, altérité », Peuples Méditerranéens, 18, Paris (1982), p. 20-42.
- Dejeux, J., «La Kahina: de l’histoire à la fiction littéraire. Mythe et épopée», Studi Magrebini, 15, Napoli, (1983), p. 1-42.
- Dejeux, J., «Le bandit d’honneur en Algérie, de la réalité et l’oralité à la fiction», Etudes et Documents Berbères, 4, Paris, (1988), p. 39-60, [deux poèmes sur Ben Zelmat, p. 56-7].
- Dejeux, J., Les femmes d’Algérie; légendes, tradition, histoire, littérature, Paris, La Boîte à Documents, (1987), 347 p.
- Dieleman, F., Esquisse de la langue berbère chaouia (Algérie). Variations lexicales et phonétiques et investigation sociolinguistique, Aix-en-Provence, l’Université, (1994), 285p. [carte. Mém. de maîtrise, Sci. du language].
- Djarallah, A., «Un conte chaouï: Hend utteγyult», Awal, Cahiers d’Études Berbères, 1, Paris, (1985), p. 163-175.
- Djarallah, A., «Baγyay, un conte chaouï», Awal, Cahiers d’Études Berbères, 3, Paris, (1987), p. 198-201.
- Djarallah, A., «Un conte dans le parler des Aït Abdi (Aurès méridional)», Études et Documents Berbères, 4, Paris, (1988), p. 139-142.
- Djeghloul, A., Éléments d’histoire culturelle algérienne, Alger, ENAL, (1984), 244 p.
- Faublée, J. «A propos de Thérèse Rivière (1901-1970) et de ses missions dans l’Aurès», Études et Documents Berbères, 4, Paris, (1988), p. 94-102.
- Fery, R., «Aurès (Le Haf)», Encyclopédie Berbère, 43, Aix-en-Provence, Edisud (1988), 1p.
- Galand, L., «Libyque et berbère», Annuaire EPHE, ive section, Paris, (1977–78), p. 199-212.
- Gaudry, M., La femme chaouïa de l’Aurès, Étude de sociologie berbère, Paris, P. Geuthner, (1929), [texte poétique, p. 274-279].
- Hamouda, N., «Les femmes rurales de l’Aurès et la production poétique», Peuples Méditerranéens, 22–23, Paris, (1983), p. 267-269, [texte poétique].
- Hamouda, N., «Rural women in the Aurès: A poetry in context», Journal of the Oral History Society, 13:1-2, Essex, (1985), [Traduction de et résumé de : «Les femmes rurales de l’Aurès et la production poétiqe », Peuples Méditerranéens, 22–23, Paris, (1983), p. 267-279.].
- Huyghe, R.P., Dictionnaire français-chaouïa (Qamūs rūmi-caui), Alger, Jourdan, 1906, 750 p. [Lihographié].
- Huyghe, R.P., Dictionnaire chaouïa-arabe-kabyle- français, Alger, Jourdan, (1907), 571 p.
- Joly, A., « Le chaouiya des Ouled Sellem », Revue Africaine, Alger, (1912), 88 p. (= 1911–4, p. 441-449 et 1912–2, p. 219-266), [suivi d’un vocabulaire et une brève description morpho-syntaxique].
- Kerhuel, Y.G. éd., «Chants et poèmes des Berbères de l’Aurès», Simoun, Oran, 25, (1957), p. 11-26.
- Khelfa, A., Moumna, Batna, Editions Echihab, (2002).
- Lafkioui, M. & Merolla, D., Contes berbères chaouis de l'Aurès d'après Gustave Mercier, Köln, Köppe, (2002), 163 p.
- Mercier, G., Mœurs et traditions de l'aurès. Cinq textes berbères en dialecte chaouia, Paris, (1900).
- Maougal, M., «L’arabisation des Chaouïa», Nedjma, 1, Paris, (1981), p. 20-42.
- Maougal, M., «Une étude sociolinguistique en pays chaouïa», Nedjma, 6, Paris, (1984), p. 35-50.
- Masqueray, E., Comparaison d’un vocabulaire des Zenaga avec les vocabulaires correspondants des dialectes Chawia et des Beni Mzab, Paris, Imprimerie Nationale, (Archives des missions scientifiques et littéraires 3/5), (1879), p. 473-533.
- Masqueray, E., Formation des cités chez les populations sédentaires de l’Algérie. Kabyles du Djurdjura, Chaouia de l’Aourâs, Beni Mezâb, (Réed.) Aix-en-Provence, Edisud, (1886–1983), 374 p. [Archives maghrébines, Centre des Recher. Et d’Études sur les Sociétés Méditerranéennes/Fac-sim. De l’éd. de Paris, Leroux, (1886)].
- Masqueray, E., «Le Djebel-Chechar», Revue Africaine, 22, Alger, (1878), p. 26-48, 129–145, 202–214, 259–281, 29, (1885), p. 72-110, [Données linguistiques].
- Masqueray, E., «Traditions de l’Aourâs oriental», Bulletin de Correspondance Africaine, 3/185, Paris, Leroux, (1885), p. 72-110.
- Masqueray, E., «Voyage dans l’Aourâs», Bulletin de la Société de Géographie, Paris, 6:VI, (1876), [texte en langue chawia, p. 55-56].
- Mercier, G., «Cinq textes berbères en dialecte chaouïa», Journal Asiatique, Paris, (1900).
- Mercier, G., «Étude sur la toponymie berbère de la région de l’Aurès», Actes du XIe Congrès International des Orientalistes, Paris, (1897), p. 173-207, [sect. Egypte et langues africaines].
- Mercier, G., Le chaouïa de l'Aurès (dialecte de l'Ahmar-Khaddo). Étude grammaticale, Paris, Leroux et Publications de la Faculté des Lettres d'Alger, (1896), 3-80 p. et 326 p. (PFLA=Bulletin de correspondance africaine 17), [texte en dialecte chaouïa].
- Mercier, G., «Les noms des plantes en dialecte chaouïa de l’Aurès», xvie Congrès International des Orientalistes, 2/4, Alger, (1905), p. 79-92.
- Merolla, D., «Il ‘Tempo di Roma’in alcuni racconti orali dei gruppi berberofoni chaouia dell Aures (Algéria)», Studi e materiali di Storia delle religioni, 54 :12-1, Rome, (1988), p. 133-150.
- Meziani, M, Axel., Étude de sociologie-politique des minorités berbères en Algérie, Genève, Université de Genève, (1994).
- Meziani, M, Axel., Pronoms Clitiques du chawi, Genève, Université de Genève, (1997).
- Meziani, M, Axel., La morphologie casuelle du chawi, Reykjavik, University of Iceland, (1997).
- Morizot, J. L’Aurès ou le mythe de la montagne rebelle, Paris, l’Harmattan, (1991), 273 p.
- Morizot, P. Le groupement berbérophone chaouia du Sud Constantinois. Son caractère, son évolution, Paris, Centre de Hautes Études Administratives de l’Afrique et d’Asie Modernes, (1946).
- Note concernant les Aoulad-Daoud du Mont-Aurès (Aourâs), Alger, A. Jourdan, (1879).
- Ounissi, Mohamed Salah. Amawal S tcawit, Tafransist, Taârabt (Dictionnaire Chaoui Français Arabe). Algiers, Enag Éditions (2003), 161 p.
- Ounissi, Mohamed Salah, Contes de berbérie et du monde. Tinfusin si tmazgha d umadal, Alger, Enag Éditions, (2003), 111 p.
- Ounissi, Mohamed Salah, Inzan d timseâreq. Proverbes et devinettes chaouis, Alger, Enag Éditions, (2002), 193 p.
- Papier, A., «De l’étymologie des mots employés par les Grecs, les Romains, les Arabes pour désigner le Djebel Aurès», Revue de l’Afrique Française, (1887).
- Penchoen, Th.G., Etude syntaxique d'un parler berbère (Ait Frah de l'Aurès), Napoli, Istituto Universitario Orientale (= Studi magrebini V), (1973), 217p. [Th. 3e cycle, Linguistique, Paris, 1966, soutenue sous le titre : « Etude syntaxique d'un parler berbère (chaouia) des Ait Frah ('Aurès), d’après les textes d’A. Basset »].
- Plault, M., «Études berbères, La langue berbère dans la commune mixte de Barika» et «Le berbère dans la commune mixte du Guergour », Revue Africaine, Alger, (1946), p. 406-409 et 194–209, [vocabulaire, bovins].
- Riviere, Th., «Coutumes agricoles de l’Aurès», Études et Documents Berbères, 3, Paris, (1987), p. 124-152, [Informations sur les documents recueillis par Th. R., Cinq textes de chansons, p. 148-152].
- Saidani, H., Visite aux Aurès. Guide touristique et culturel de Batna et des Aurès, Alger, Éditions Anep, (2003), p. 26-54.
- Servier, J., Chants de femmes de l’Aurès, Thèse complémentaire pour le doctorat des Lettres, Paris, (1995), [Inédite].
- Shaler, W., Esquisse de l’état d’Alger, Paris, Nouvelles Annales des Voyages, (1830), X, 407 p., plan. [Vocabulaire p. 319-328 (d’après J.F. Schultze et J. Benzamon). Renseignements sur les Berbères d’Algérie et leurs langues, par un consul à Alger avant la conquête française. Trad. de: Sketches of Algiers, Algiers, American Consul general at Algiers, (1926), 310 p.].
- Shaw, T., Voyages dans plusieurs provinces de la Barbarie et du Levant, La Haye, (1743), 2 vol., [Vocabulaire chaoui et des phrases t. 2, p. 134-136. Traduction de : Travels or observations relating to several parts of Baraby and the Levant, Oxford, Publ. ?, (1738), 441 et 60 p. En appendice, vocabulaire chaoui p. 52].
- Sierakowsky, A., Das Schaui, ein Beitrag zur berberischen Sprach- und Volkskunde, Dresde, Kraszewski, (1871), 138 p.
- Stricker, B.H., Compte rendu de: A. Basset, Textes berbères de l’Aurès, 1961, Kroniek van Afrika, Leyde, (1967), p. 122-125.
- Stuhlmann, F., «Die Kulturgeschichtlicher Ausflug in den Aures», Atlas von Süd-Algerien, xii, Hamburg, Friederichsen, (1912), 205 p. [Glossaire de termes techniques berbères (géographie, faune, flore, tissage, vêtements...].
- Stumme, H., Arabische und berberische Dialekte, Berlin, PubLg: Allemand, (1928), p. 14-19.
- Tafsut (série normale, Tizi-Ouzou), 4, (1982), p. 24-28: Dihya, neγ tigγri n Wawras (Dihya, ou l’appel des Aurès), [texte berbère sur une chanteuse aurésienne].
- Vycichl, W., «Un problème de cartographie historique: Claude Ptolémée et la cartographie de la Tunisie actuelle», Polyphème, 1, PubLg: Français, (1969), p. 31-33, [dénominations des points cardinaux].
- Zouaoui, Y., La variation linguistique dans six parlers berbères d'Algérie : (étude fonctionnelle et comparative des unités syntaxiques du kabyle de la soummam et des Babors, du chaoui, du mozabite et du touareg de l'Ahaggar), Paris, Univ. Paris, (1996), [Thèse].
