= Aurès =

Coordinates: 35°20′N 6°40′E

Aurès Awras ⴰⵓⵔⴻⵙ أَورَاس
- Natural region
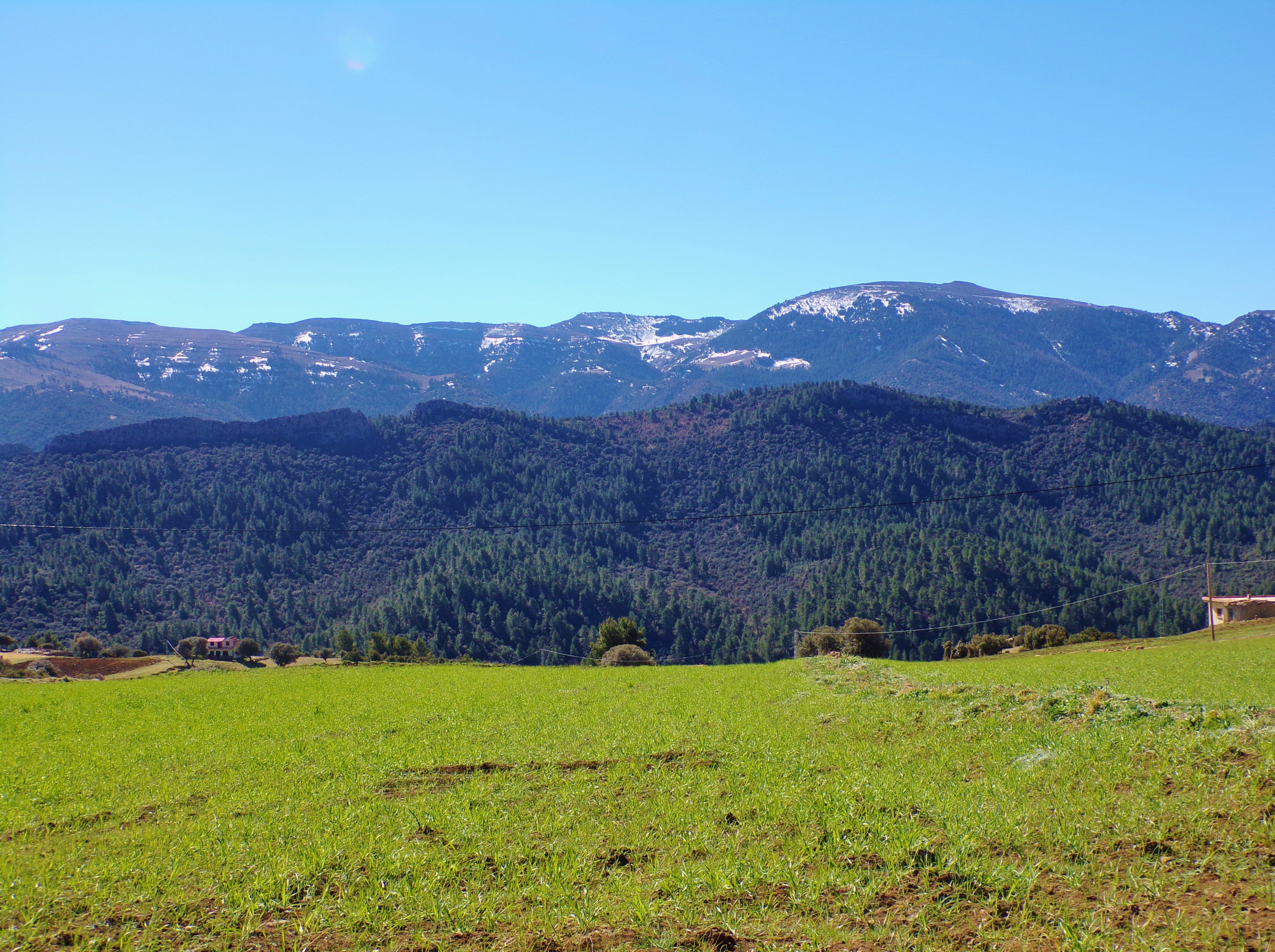
- Overall overview of the Chelia mont from Yabous region, Khenchela province

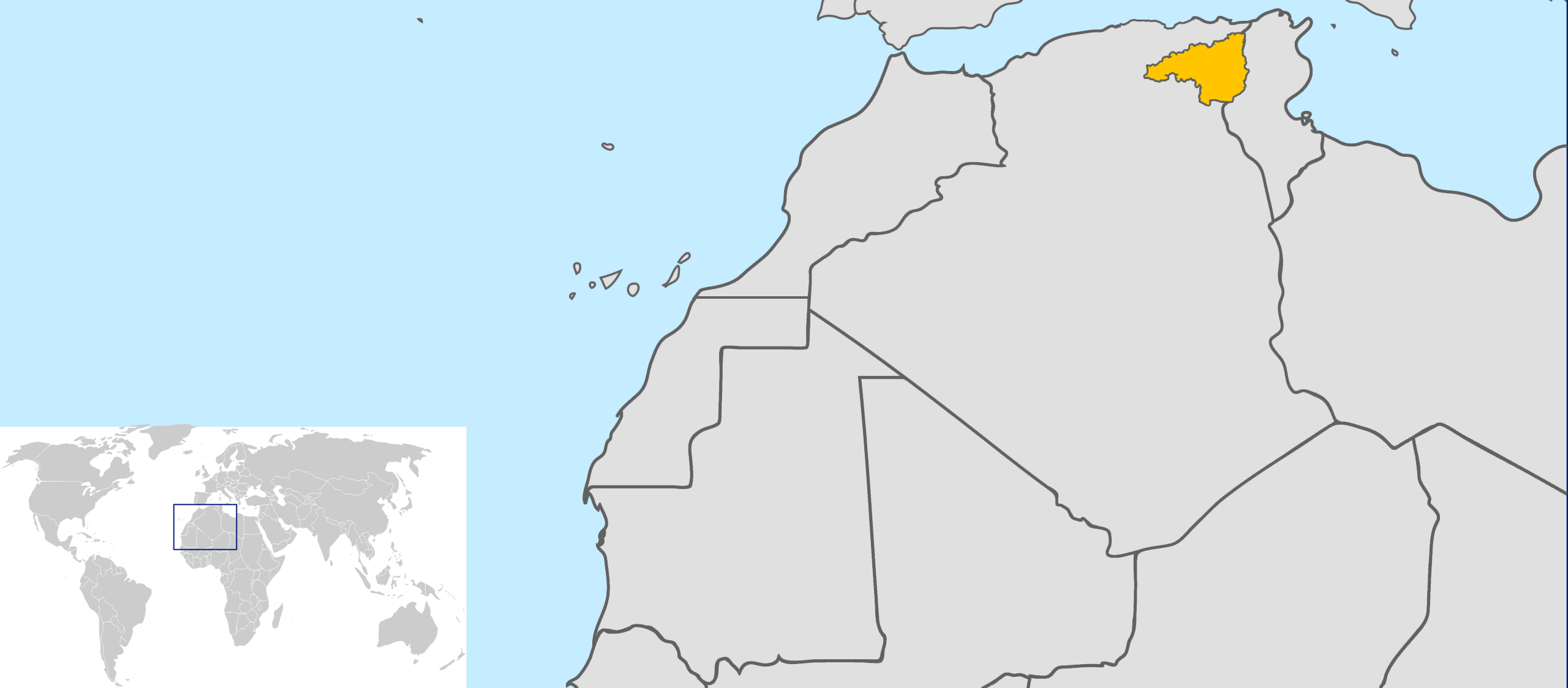
- A map of northern Algeria showing the location of the Aurès
- Country: Algeria
- Elevation: 450 m (1,480 ft)

Aurès (Berber languages: ⴰⵓⵔⴻⵙ, romanized: Awras; Arabic: أَوْرَاس, romanized: Awrās) is a natural region located in the mountainous area of the Aurès range, in eastern Algeria. The region includes the Algerian provinces of Batna, Tebessa, Constantine, Khenchela, Oum El Bouaghi, Souk Ahras and Biskra.

== History ==
The Aurès region is characterized by its montaneous terrain and by the Berber Chaoui ethnic group, which historically has inhabited the area. The rugged terrain of the Aurès has made the region one of the least developed areas in the Maghreb. Traditionally, the women of the region wore tattoos.

It was in the Aurès region that the Algerian War of Independence was started by Berber independence fighters such as Mostefa Ben Boulaïd, who operated from the area. A district of Algeria that existed during and after the war, from 1962 to 1974, was named after the region.

== See also ==
- Chakhchoukha
- Chaoui people
