= English language in Algeria =

Languages of Algeria
- Official: Arabic, Tamazight
- Regional: Hassaniya (unrecognized), Korandje (unrecognized)
- Vernacular: Algerian Arabic, Algerian Berber, Algerian French
- Immigrant: Dawsahak
- Foreign: English, French, Spanish
- Signed: Algerian Sign Language
- Keyboard layout: AZERTY

English is taught in schools in Algeria. English is gradually replacing French as the main foreign language. In 2026, for the first time in the country's history, primary schools began teaching English instead of French.

== Overview ==
In recent years, English has gained popularity as the second most widely studied foreign language in Algeria, following French. However, in the 1960s and 1970s, English was not prominently featured in Algerian textbooks, possibly due to apprehension regarding a neocolonial experience similar to that of France. By the mid-1980s, English started to gain space in society. According to a 1984 report by the British Council, English was considered a third language in Algeria.

The real presence of English in Algeria began to emerge in the beginning of the 1990s with the arrival of foreign energy companies specializing in gas and petroleum in the southern region of the country. Algerian scholars started to learn English for scientific research and publication. Between 1998 and 2003, out of 1,410 national projects published in Algeria, 681 (48%) were published in English, followed by French with 528 (37%).

Since 2017, the popularity of English has experienced a significant surge, primarily due to the rise of the internet and the boom of social media platforms. This trend is observable not only in social media but also in fashion and food businesses, as well as in private language schools, training centers, business establishments, and online platforms.

Under President Abdelmadjid Tebboune, Algeria has emphasized the teaching of English. Starting in 2022, English language learning was introduced to most years of primary school, and a training program was implemented for new high school graduates. The government also supports English language learning for teachers to enhance their skills before the start of the new university season.

== Presentation ==
According to the Euromonitor International site, the English language was spoken in 2012 by 7% of Algerians, and learning this language is also explained by the fact that many Algerians have emigrated to the United Kingdom and other English-speaking countries.

== Education ==
Since the independence of Algeria in 1962, the English language has been taught to the majority of students from the middle level. In July 2022, Algerian President Abdelmadjid Tebboune announced that primary schools will start to teach English in late 2022.

== Media ==
There is no English-speaking Algeria television channel, nor are there radio channel broadcasts in English.

Even the Radio Algérie Internationale channel only produces a few minutes of English-language programs a day, which are broadcast on the air from 8 p.m.

== Newspapers ==
There is no English daily or periodical newspaper that is published in Algeria.

It was only the Arabic-speaking newspaper Echorouk El Yawmi which tried in collaboration with the British Council to popularize the English language in Algeria by devoting one to two pages per week for initiation into the language.

== See also ==
- Geographical distribution of English speakers
- English-speaking world
- List of countries and territories where English is an official language
- Ministry of National Education (Algeria)
- Ministry of Higher Education and Scientific Research (Algeria)
- Radio Algeria
- Television in Algeria
