= Languages of Algeria =

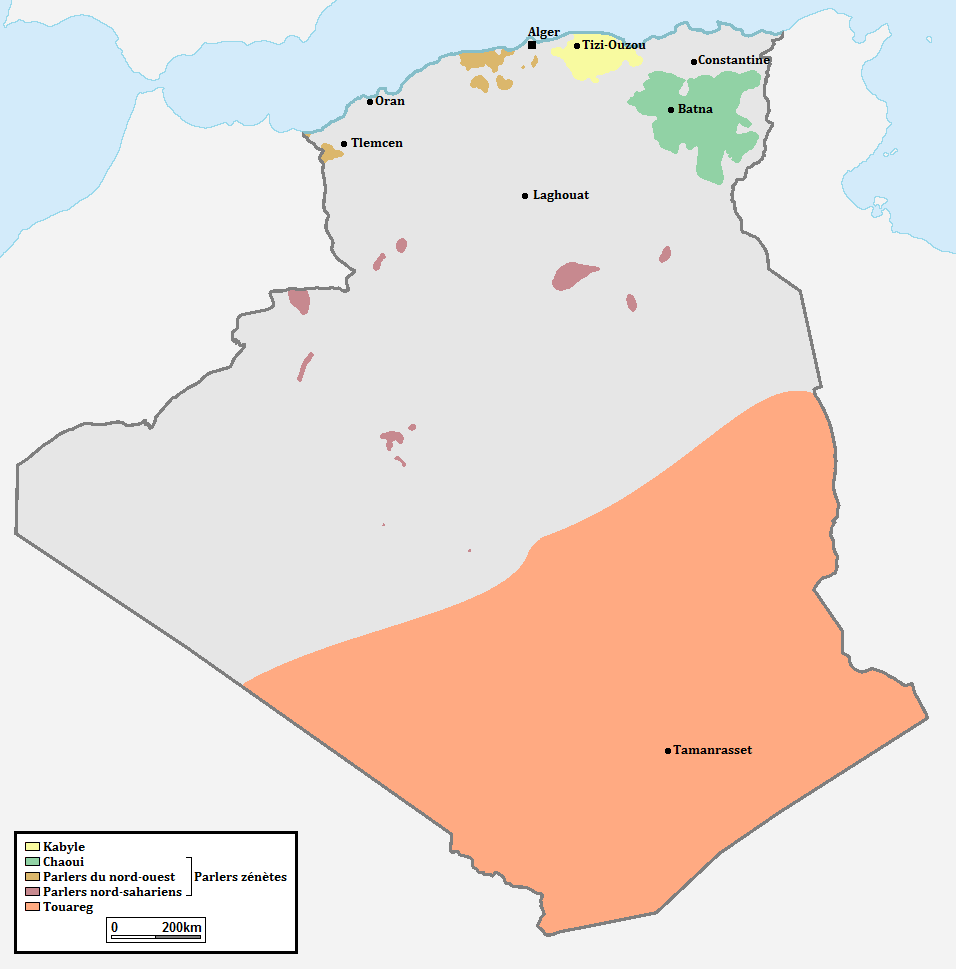
- Linguistic map of Algeria Arabic Kabyle Western Algerian Zenatic Shawiya Mzab–Wargla Tuareg
- Official: Modern Standard Arabic; Standard Algerian Berber
- Vernacular: Varieties of Arabic (81.5%): Algerian Arabic (73%); Hassaniya Arabic (11.3%); Berber languages (15.4%): Kabyle (9.4%); Shawiya (5.3%); Mozabite (0.7%); Other: Korandje
- Immigrant: Turkish
- Foreign: French 70% English 30%
- Signed: Algerian Sign Language
- Keyboard layout: AZERTY

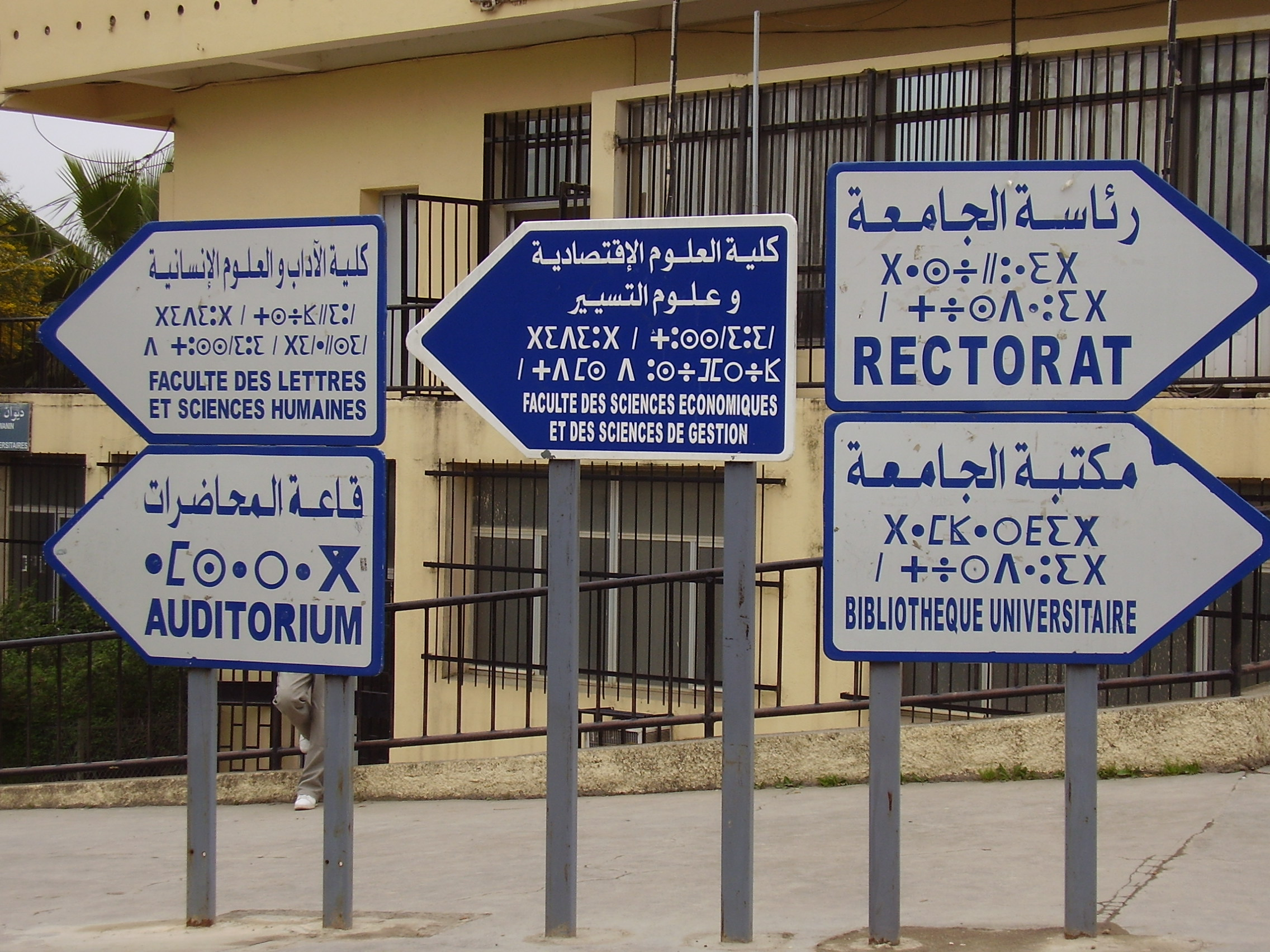
Trilingual signs at the Mouloud Mammeri University of Tizi-Ouzou

The official languages of Algeria are Modern Standard Arabic and Standard Algerian Amazigh, as specified in its constitution since 1963 for the former and since 2016 for the latter. Arabic, particularly vernacular Algerian Arabic, is the most widely spoken language in Algeria, but a number of regional and foreign languages are also spoken. Standard Algerian Amazigh has been recognized as a national language by constitutional amendment since 8 May 2002. In February 2016, a constitutional resolution was passed making this Berber Language an official language alongside Arabic. Arabic is spoken by about 81% of Algerians, while Berber languages are spoken by 17%. French, though it has no official status, is still used in media (some newspapers) and education due to Algeria's colonial history. Kabyle, with 3 million speakers, is the most spoken Berber language in the country, is taught and partially co-official (with a few restrictions) in parts of Kabylie.

The 1966 Algerian census, the last to include a question about the mother tongue, showed that 81.5% of the population spoke Arabic as a native language, with about half of the Berber population also speaking it as a second language, while 17.9% spoke Berber languages natively.

Malika Rebai Maamri, author of "The Syndrome of the French Language in Algeria," said "The language spoken at home and in the street remains a mixture of Algerian dialect and French words." Due to the number of languages and complexity involving those languages, Maamri argued that "[t]oday the linguistic situation in Algeria is dominated by multiple discourses and positions."

== Currently spoken languages ==
=== Arabic ===
The majority of Algerians are Arabophones. Results from 2009 showed that 72% of Algerians spoke Arabic: 60% spoke Algerian Arabic (83% of Arabic speakers); 11.3% of Arabic speakers spoke Hassaniyya; 0.4% spoke Moroccan Arabic; 0.1% spoke Saharan Arabic; a smaller number spoke Egyptian Arabic or Iraqi Arabic. Non-native speakers learn Literary Arabic at school, and as such a relative majority of the population understands Standard Arabic or the Algerian Arabic dialect. Algerian Arabic (or derja) is spoken by 60% of the total population (83% of Arab speakers).

The 1963 constitution of Algeria made Arabic the official language, and this was retained in the 1976 constitution. The 1976 constitution states in Article 3 "Arabic is the national and official language". Neither constitution mentions Berber. The Permanent Committee on Geographical Names for British Official Use (PCGN) stated "Arabic was chosen at the outset as the language which was to represent Algeria’s identity and religion, and official attitudes towards both Berber and French have been largely negative." The PCGN stated that French, not Arabic, is the actual lingua franca of Algeria. Arabic is not commonly used in the Kabylie region.

In Algeria, as elsewhere, spoken Arabic differs very substantially from written Arabic; Algerian Arabic has a much-simplified vowel system, a substantially changed vocabulary and does not have the case endings of the written Arabic. Algerian Arabic does not necessarily stem from written Arabic. Within Algerian Arabic itself, there are significant local variations; Jijel Arabic, in particular, is noteworthy for its pronunciation of qaf as kaf and its profusion of Berber loanwords, and the dialects of some ports show influence from Andalusi Arabic brought by refugees from al-Andalus. Algerian Arabic is part of the Maghrebi Arabic dialect continuum, and fades into Moroccan Arabic and Tunisian Arabic along the respective borders.

In the Sahara, more conservative Bedouin dialects, grouped under the name Saharan Arabic, are spoken; in addition, the many Sahrawi refugees at Tindouf speak Hassaniya Arabic. Most Jews of Algeria once spoke dialects of Arabic specific to their community, collectively termed Judeo-Arabic.

After Algeria became independent in 1962, it tried to improve fluency by importing Arabic teachers from Egypt and Syria. Martin Regg Cohn of the Toronto Star said that many of the instructors were unqualified. In 1963, of the 1,300,000 literate people in Algeria, an estimate of 300,000 read literary Arabic. Mohamed Benrabah, author of "Language maintenance and spread: French in Algeria," said that during that year, "linguistic competence in Standard Arabic was relatively low." Malika Rebai Maamri, author of "The Syndrome of the French Language in Algeria," said that as of 2009, "classical Arabic is still not mastered even at higher educational levels" and that "dialectical Arabic cannot express things in writing."

As of 2012, remaining generations educated under the French colonial system are unable to read or write Arabic.

=== Berber ===
The Berber languages are considered the native language of Algeria since antiquity. They are spoken in five major dialects in many parts of the territory, but mainly in Kabylia, in the Awras, and in the Algerian Sahara desert (by Algerian Tuaregs).

Before, during and after Phoenician settlers' arrival, Berber remained spoken throughout ancient Algeria (Numidia), as later attested by early Tifinagh (or Libyco-Berber) inscriptions, and as understood from Latin and Greek historical sources. Despite the presence or growth of Latin, and later Arabic, in some urban areas, Tamazight remained the majority language of Algeria since ancient times until well after the French invasion in 1830.

Arabic remained Algeria's only official language until 2002, when Berber was recognized as a second national language. And in 2016 Berber was recognized as a second official language of Algeria.

The 1963 constitution and the 1976 constitution do not mention Berber and French. The Permanent Committee on Geographical Names for British Official Use (PCGN) stated "official attitudes towards both Berber and French have been largely negative" and "The Algerian authorities have even at times rejected use of the very word “Berber”, either on the secular grounds that the term undermines national unity, or on the religious grounds that it is a term hostile to Identity and prefer to call it Tamazight another name for Berber." Berber and French are the two languages commonly used in the Kabylie region.

Percentage of Berber speakers in Algeria
Census year	Percentage
1828	79%
1868	61%
1906	30%
1948	17%
1966	17.8%

The Berber languages/dialects spoken in Algeria include:

==== In the north ====
- Kabyle, about 3 million speakers mostly in Kabylie and surrounding regions.
- Shawiya (also called Tachawit, Chawi) in the Aurès, with about 2 million speakers.
- Shenwa, in the Dahra region, particularly of Jebel Chenoua in Algeria, just west of Algiers near Tipaza province and Cherchell and the Chlef., estimated 56,300 speakers. Two main dialects: Beni Menacer, west and south of Mount Chenoua area, in the Mount Chenoua area, 55,250 speakers.
- The Tamazight of Blida, traditionally spoken in the wilaya of Blida.
- The Matmata dialect, spoken in some villages of the Ouarsenis region.

==== In the extreme northwest ====
- Beni Snous and Beni Said, dialects of Berber spoken in various villages of the wilaya of Tlemcen.

==== In the Sahara ====
- Mozabite (Tumẓabt) in the M'zab
- language of Touat-Gourara (called "Taznatit" by the Ethnologue, but that name is used for most of the Zenati languages)
- language of Touggourt and Temacine
- Tamahaq, among the Tuareg of the Hoggar (see Tuareg languages)

=== French ===
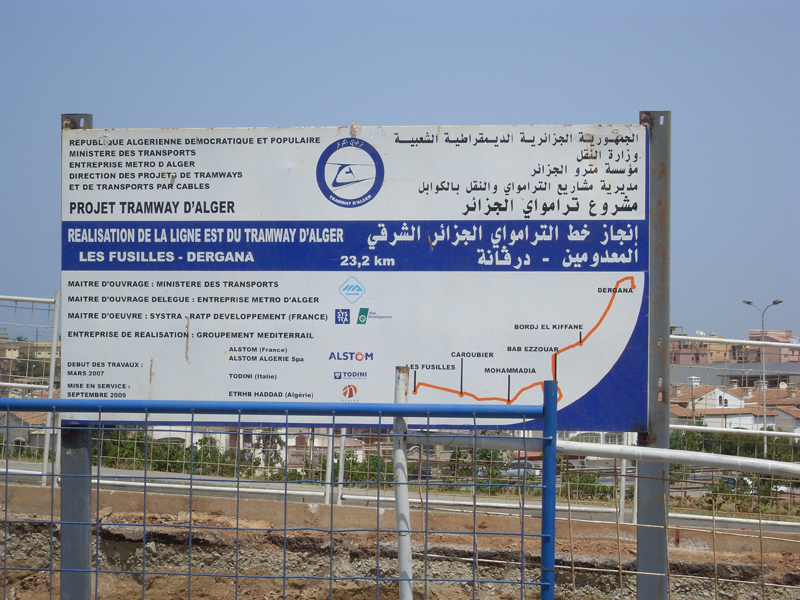
Bilingual French-Arabic sign in Algiers.

The CIA World Factbook states that French is a lingua franca of Algeria. The Permanent Committee on Geographical Names for British Official Use (PCGN) states "In reality, French is the lingua franca of Algeria", and that despite government efforts to remove French, it has never ceased being the lingua franca. Algeria is the second largest Francophone country in the world in terms of speakers. In 2022, 14.9 million Algerians, or 33% of the population were classified as Francophone by the Organisation internationale de la Francophonie.

The 1963 and 1976 constitutions do not mention Berber and French. The PCGN stated "official attitudes towards both Berber and French have been largely negative". French and Berber are the two languages commonly used in the Kabylie region.

French is a part of the standard school curriculum, and is widely understood (18 million Algerians can write and read French, which is 50% of the population, and the figure is higher if those who can only speak and understand it are included; Ethnologue estimates indicate that 10,200 people in Algeria speak it as their native language, mostly pied-noirs who stayed behind and people raised in French-speaking households.) Some two-thirds of Algerians have a "fairly broad" grasp of French, and half speak it as a second language. French is widely used in media and commerce. French is widely used and spoken in everyday life in Algeria's larger cities, in diglossic combination with Algerian Arabic. Malika Rebai Mammri, author of "The Syndrome of the French Language in Algeria," said "French continues to be the dominant language in business and professional circles" and that "certain aspects of formal education and research are still carried in the French language and a great part of the economic and industrial sectors and press still use French extensively."

French is the most widely studied foreign language in the country, and a majority of Algerians can understand it and speak it. Since independence, the government has pursued a policy of linguistic Arabization of education and bureaucracy, which has resulted in limiting the use of Berber and the Arabization of many Berber-speakers. The strong position of French in Algeria was little affected by the Arabization policy. All scientific and business university courses are still taught in French. Recently, schools have begun to incorporate French into the curriculum as early as children are taught written classical Arabic. French is also used in media and business. After a political debate in Algeria in the late 1990s about whether to replace French with English in the educational system, the government decided to retain French. English is taught in the first year of middle schools.

In spite of its widespread use of French, Algeria has not joined the Organisation internationale de la Francophonie, an international organization of French-speaking countries. Although not a member, they attend for it.

In 2014, 76% of Facebook users in Algeria posted in French, while 32% posted in Arabic. In 2016, 68% used Facebook in French, while 43% used it in Arabic.

=== English ===
According to the Algerian envoy to India, only five percent of the population are able to speak "good English". That led the Government to invite Indians to teach the language in Algerian universities in 2012. Some 100 institutes affiliated to 13 Algerian universities needed nearly 250 English teachers in early 2012.

=== Korandje ===
The Korandje language of the Saharan oasis of Tabelbala is a heavily Berber-influenced variety of Songhay. A Nilo-Saharan language, it is more widely spoken far to the south in Niger.

=== Sign languages ===
Algerian Sign Language is used in Algeria by the deaf; it has sometimes been used on national TV.

== Formerly spoken languages ==
=== Phoenician ===
Phoenician, particularly in its North African Punic form, was brought to Algeria by Carthage's influence, it was an influential language in the region; Augustine learned it, and quotes occasional phrases. However, by his time the language was losing ground to Latin, and no trace of it survives now (apart from occasional names of places).

=== Latin ===
Latin (which later developed into the brief-existent, little-known African Romance language) was the language of the Roman occupation; it became widely spoken in the coastal towns, and Augustine attests that in his day it was gaining ground over Punic. However, it continued to flourish until the 11th century especially in towns and in Tunisia. It died out in the 14th century.

=== Ottoman Turkish ===
Ottoman rule after the 16th century brought a dominant minority of Turks to Algeria, particularly concentrated in the large cities; for a while, Ottoman Turkish became a major governmental language. However, over time these Turks gradually assimilated, and, while many families of partial Turkish descent remain in Algeria, none speak the language.

=== Other ===
- Ladino was formerly spoken by some Algerian Jews, particularly around Oran, in the Tetuani dialect; however, most shifted to French during the colonial period.
- The Mediterranean Lingua Franca, a mixture of many Mediterranean languages, was once widespread as a means of communication with foreigners in the ports, including the slaves of the bagnios and the European renegades that joined the Barbary pirates; after 1830, it gradually disappeared, its functions taken over by French.
- Spanish has a long history in Oran, which was occupied by Spain for long periods between 1509 and 1790; it has left some traces in that city's dialect. It was also spoken by pied-noirs immigrating from the Spanish Mediterranean. Spanish is also spoken by the Sahrawis living in refugee camps in the area of Tindouf. As of 2020, there are two Instituto Cervantes in Algiers and Oran, promoting the study and the teaching of Spanish language and culture.
- Patuet is a Catalan dialect with French and Arabic influences spoken by pied-noirs from Catalan-speaking areas.

== Languages used in the Algerian government ==
Mohamed Benrabah, author of "Language maintenance and spread: French in Algeria," said that as of 2007, "Arabization is either complete or almost complete" in the Ministry of Justice, the Ministry of Religious Affairs and registry offices in Algerian town halls. He also said that the Ministry of Education had been affected to a "lesser extent." Official documents of ministries which had not been affected partially or fully to Arabization are often written in French, and Arabic translations of these documents are provided when needed. Benrabah said that as of 2007 "the use of French in a number of higher domains has diminished since the colonial era when the language held an unassailable position in the media, education, government, and administration."

In 1968 the Algerian government decreed that all civil positions use the Arabic language. In 1990 the government ruled that Arabic is the only language to be used in institutions and public service, and imprisonment was a penalty for violating this law. Around 1997 the Algerian government had passed laws prohibiting officials from speaking any language other than Arabic publicly. The government laws called for a fine for officials who prepared government documents not in Arabic. The government mandated that all textbooks and lectures must be Arabic, with French ones being phased out. The laws also stated that all television broadcasts must be in Arabic only. In 1997, Slimane Chikh, the Minister of Education, said that French needed to be phased out because it was preventing Arabic from reaching prominence and because it was leading Algerians away from English, the primary international language of commerce, computers, and science.

Of the documents submitted by the Algerian government to the sessions of the United Nations Group of Experts on Geographical Names and the United Nations Conference on the Standardization of Geographical Names, all were in French, and the government used French in its participation in almost all of the conferences associated with these groups.

== Languages used in Algerian education ==
As of 2007, Arabization has mainly affected primary and secondary education, while in university education French retained a higher social prestige and class and is the language used in scientific studies. As of 2002, French was taught as a foreign language from the fourth year of primary school until the final year of secondary school. French is used in the high school level in the exact sciences, the medical sciences, and technology studies. Some specialized fields offer courses in French and courses in Arabic. Almost all students prefer the French courses in those fields. Over 60% of university students in Algeria are educated in French. In graduate programmes in social sciences, French is used.

=== History of languages in Algerian education ===
The first President of Algeria, Ahmed ben Bella, introduced Arabization in the education system in 1962. The Arabic language was introduced in all levels and all programmes in the 1963–1964 period. As time passed, the time in the educational system spent on French gradually declined. In 1964–1965 primary grade one was fully Arabized with all other levels each receiving ten hours of Arabic per period. The plans were complicated by the flight of 25,000 European teachers from Algeria and the illiteracy rate of 90%. The demographics also complicated the plans. Of 10 million Algerians, about 300,000 were fluent in Modern Standard Arabic while 1 million were able to read French and 6 million were able to speak French. To remedy this, the Algerian government hired 10,988 academic monitors. C. F. Gallagher, author of "North African problems and prospects: Language and identity", said that the monitors' "intellectual horizons [were] at times only slightly less limited than their pupils". In 1963 the government recruited 1,000 Egyptians as Arabic teachers. Mohamed Benrabah, author of "Language-in-Education Planning in Algeria: Historical Development and Current Issues", said "Most of these teachers turned out to be unqualified for teaching and totally ignorant of the Algerian social reality" and that "Their spoken Egyptian Arabic was incomprehensible to Algerians in general and Tamazight-speaking populations in particular and their traditional pedagogy (learning by rote and class recitation, physical punishment and so on) proved inadequate". In addition the teachers were members of the Muslim Brotherhood and introduced Islamist thought in Algeria. In September 1967 Minister of Education Ahmed Taleb Ibrahimi completely Arabized primary level two, so many parents delayed registration of their children in school until grade three when they could have a higher educational quality and where the French language was still dominant.

The Algerian government had plans to totally Arabize the university sector effective December 1980. In all levels of education, bilingual education ended in 1985. In that period many Algerian elites practiced "elite closure" by sending their own children to schools controlled by the French government while promoting Arabization for the masses, so their own children would learn French and have access to jobs open to those with French knowledge. Since most young Algerians had a poor command of French and were in Arabized school streams, they enrolled in Arabic-language university departments such as Islamic law and Arabic literature and were exposed to Islamist points of view. Algiers had many unofficially bilingual primary and secondary schools and Benrabah said that the elite closure practice was "most visible in Algiers". The Algerian government, in 1988, officially prohibited Algerian nationals and children of mixed Algerian and French people from attending "French Mission of Algeria" schools. President Chadli Bendjedid ruled that Algerian nationals were not permitted to attend all-French schools. The Algiers French lycée moved from one neighbourhood to another. The Lycée Cheikh Bouamama (Arabic: ثانوية الشيخ بوعمامة), originally called the Lycée Descartes, took in students from the tchitchi (children of wealthy) backgrounds instead of bohi ("rejects"). When it was nationalized it served members of the educational, military, and political elites. After Chadli's decree, the school had a secret program which placed higher emphasis on French than other Algerian secondary schools did. Many students in the programme attended universities abroad after graduation.

In 1999 the Algerian authorities conducted a survey which stated that 75% of the population supported teaching scientific school subjects in the French language. In the middle of March 2001 the National Commission for the Reform of the Educational System (CNRSE according to its French name) proposed that French would be reintroduced in grade two of the primary cycle, serving 6–7 year olds, instead of grade four, serving 8–9 year olds, and that scientific subjects in secondary school should be taught in French. Therefore, students would be biliterate in French and Arabic instead of having French as a subject. In 2002 the opponents to the bilingual educational proposal declared a fatwa against the pro-bilingual supporters. The reforms were intended to be implemented in September 2001 but the Ministry of the Interior suspended them on 3 September 2001.

By 2008 the Algerian government began reintroducing French in the school system.
