= French language in Algeria =

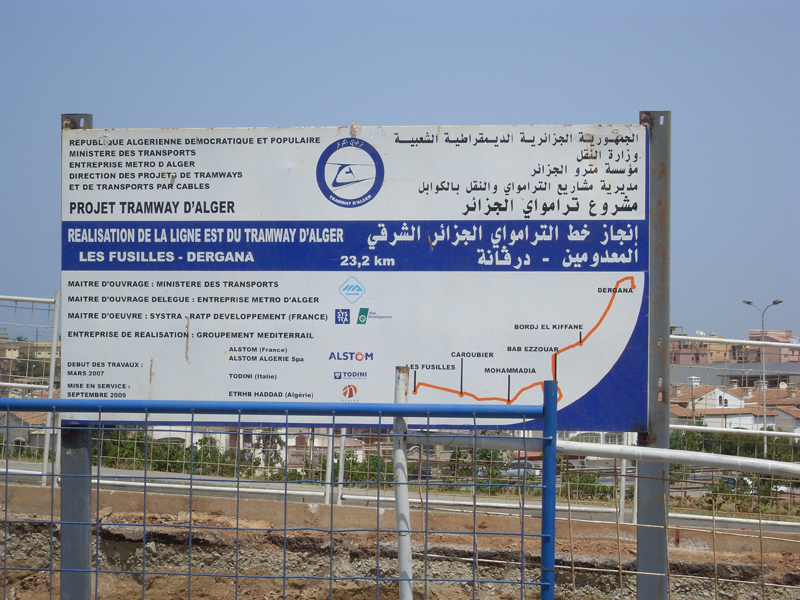
Bilingual French-Arabic sign in Algiers.

French is one of the languages spoken in Algeria. Despite not having any official status, by the 2000s the proportion of French speakers in Algeria was much higher than on the eve of independence in 1962; In 2008, 11.2 million Algerians (33%) could read and write in French. In 2022, Algeria was estimated to be the third largest Francophone country in the world in terms of speakers after France and the Democratic Republic of Congo. (Note: Excludes partial speakers and learners)

However, in the recent times, English is gradually replacing French as the main foreign language. In 2026, for the first time in the country's history, primary schools began teaching English instead of French.

== History ==
During the French colonisation from 1830 to 1962, according to Benrabah, French "symbolized foreign exploitation and was thus to be resisted" but that "it served as a tool to raise the population's awareness and support in favour of such resistance" because French conveyed "universal values" of liberty, equality, and fraternity. During the colonial period, about one million French native speakers lived in Algeria. The pieds-noirs developed a distinctive dialect, termed Pataouète. In 1963, of the 1,300,000 literate people in Algeria, 1 million read French. Of the total population, 6 million spoke French.

In the 1960s, post-independence Algerian politicians intended to carry out an Arabization campaign to replace the usage of French with Modern Standard Arabic. The Algerian government taught French as the first mandatory foreign language for students beginning in the fourth grade in the primary cycle, from the end of the 1970s to the early 1990s. In September 1993 the Ministry of Primary and Secondary Education made French and English two separate choices for the first mandatory foreign language; students were required to pick one over the other; the great majority of students selected French as their first mandatory foreign language. Opponents of French-Arabic bilingualism in Algeria argued that French was a colonialist and imperialist language. A report for the High Council of Francophonie in Paris stated in 1986 that in Algeria, 150,000 people spoke French as a first language and 6.5 million spoke French as a second language. The total population of Algeria at the time was 21 million.

Benrabah said that "[f]rom a quantitative point of view, today's Algeria is the second largest French-speaking community in the world" and that "Arabization, or the language policy implemented to displace French altogether, failed." In 1990, 6,650,000 people in Algeria spoke French, with 150,000 being native speakers and 6,500,000 being second-language speakers. In 1993, of 27.3 million people in Algeria, 49% spoke French. At the time, studies predicted that 67% of the Algerian population would speak French by 2003. The Abassa Institute polled 1,400 Algerian households in April 2000 about their language use. Of them, 60% spoke and/or understood the French language. The institute used its findings to represent the 14 million Algerian citizens who were of the age 16 or older. Benrabah said that the polls confirm the trend of French increasing in Algeria.

Maamri said that in 2009, due to the advent of satellite television channels that carry Francophone entertainment, the language "is now enjoying something of a revival." She added that "Also over the years, the Algerian government has pushed back, reintroducing French."

Between 2017 and 2018, Arabic for the first time overtook French as the most used language in Algeria in two of the most used websites in the country: Facebook and Wikipedia.

In 2014, 76% of Facebook users in Algeria posted in French, while 32% posted in Arabic; in 2016 68% used Facebook in French, while 43% used it in Arabic.

In 2016, the French-language Wikipedia was the most consulted version of Wikipedia in Algeria, accounting for 45% of page views, surpassing those in Arabic (39%) and English (14%). Two years later, in 2018, Arabic had surpassed French, with the Arabic-language Wikipedia accounting for 43% of the page views in Algeria, ahead of French-language Wikipedia, with 38%.

In 2022 the Algerian government used English language signage instead of French during a meeting with Emmanuel Macron, and the government announced that English, instead of French, would become the introduced language in primary schools on up.

In 2025, there were plans for English to be used in medical schools instead of French, and by then there was less instructional time regarding the French language in Algerian schools.

== Status ==
The 1963 and 1976 constitutions do not mention Berber and French. The Permanent Committee on Geographical Names for British Official Use (PCGN), in a 2003 document, states "In reality, French is the lingua franca of Algeria", and that despite government efforts to remove French, it never stopped being the lingua franca. The PCGN stated "official attitudes towards both Berber and French have been largely negative". The CIA World Factbook in 2012 described it being used as a "lingua franca". In spite of its widespread use of French, Algeria has not joined the Organisation internationale de la Francophonie, an international organization of French-speaking countries.

The choice of language of Algerian leaders in public reflects their language policy: Houari Boumédiène, second president of Algeria from 1965 to 1978, was strongly against French and never used it publicly. Chadli Bendjedid, third president of the country, used only classical Arabic in his speeches, as did Liamine Zéroual. Other political leaders, such as Mohamed Boudiaf and Abdelaziz Bouteflika, had a more favourable attitude towards French. Bouteflika in particular believed that the Francophone dimension of Algeria was evident in the impact of thinkers such as Descartes and the parallels between the French and Algerian revolutions.

== Usage ==
As of 2009 some two-thirds of Algerians have a "fairly broad" grasp of French, and half speak it as a second language. Ethnologue estimates indicate that 10,200 people in Algeria speak it as their native language. Malika Rebai Mammri, author of "The Syndrome of the French Language in Algeria," said "French continues to be the dominant language in business and professional circles" and that "certain aspects of formal education and research are still carried in the French language and a great part of the economic and industrial sectors and press still use French extensively." French and Berber are the two languages commonly used in the Kabylie region.

According to Mohamed Benrabah, "[t]he attitude of Algerians towards the French language is a complex one mainly because of recent history." As of 2007, Algeria Arabo-Islamists are supportive of monolingual Arabic while "modernists" which mostly consist of Francophone and secular members of the Algerian elite and the general population favor bilingualism in Arabic and French.

== See also ==
- Geographical distribution of French speakers
