= Kaous, Algeria =

Kaous قاوس
- City and Common
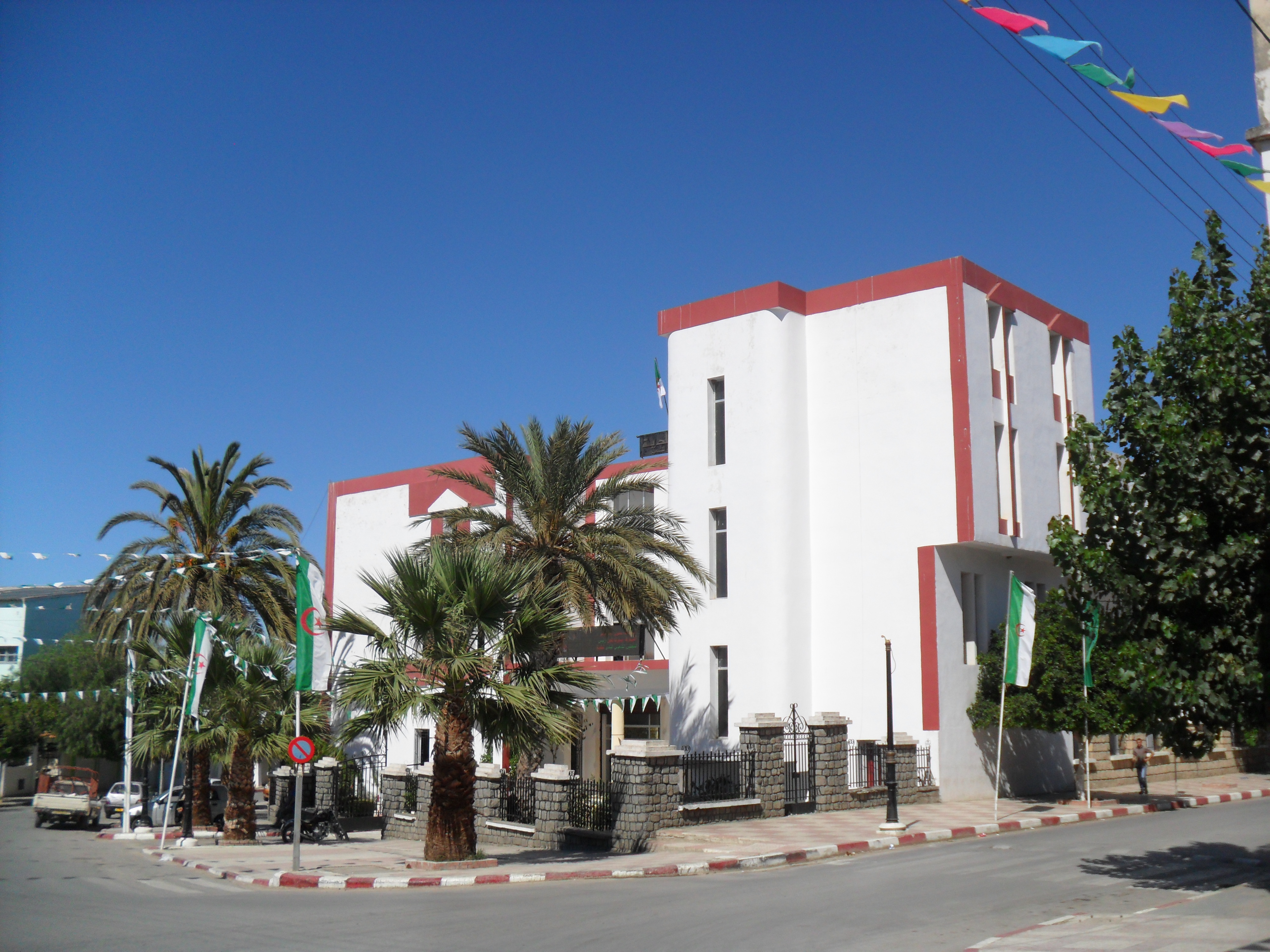
- Kaous

- Location of Kaous in the Jijel Province

- Location of Kaous in the Algeria
- Coordinates: 36.7701723°N 5.8136168°E
- Country: Algeria
- Province: Jijel Province
- District: Texenna District
- APC: 2012-2017

Government
  - Type: Municipality

Population (2008)
  - Total: 26,137
- Time zone: UTC+1 (CET)
- ISO 3166 code: CP

Kaous (Arabic: قاوس; Algerian Arabic: قاوس),. In 2008, the population was 26,137. Kaous is a commune of Jijel Province.
