= Brahim Metiba =

Algerian writer

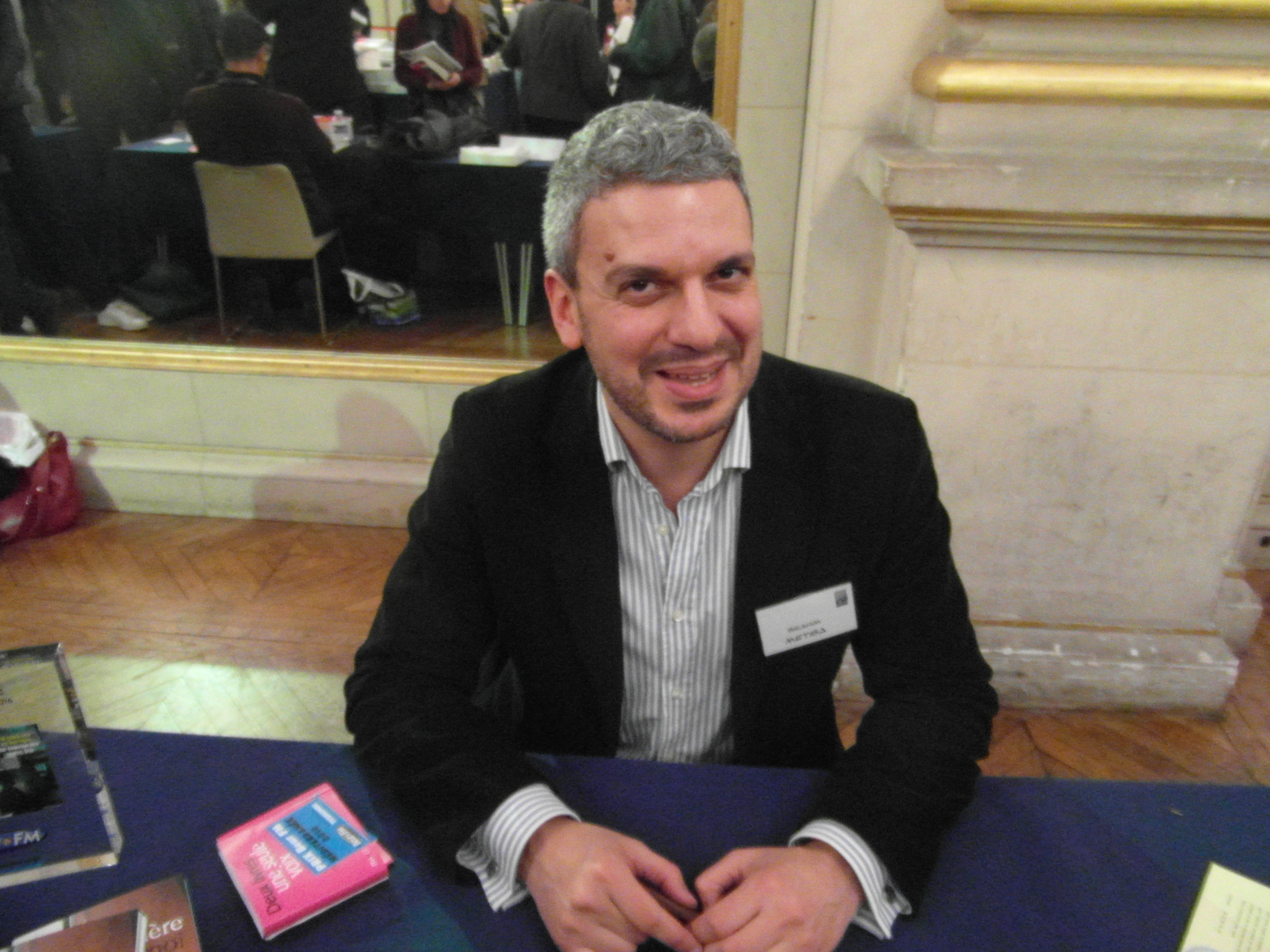
- Born: June 4, 1977 (44 years old); France
- Occupation: Writer
- Notable work: My Mother and I, I don't have time to gossip with you

Brahim Metiba (Arabic: إبراهيم متيبا) is an Algerian writer living in France.

== Career ==
Metiba has published a number of novels, the most notable novel is "My Mother and I", which talks about the personality of the heterosexual intellectual Louay, who adopts other cultural characteristics. In contrast to this comes the character of his illiterate mother, who sticking to her cultural identity. This novel has been successful in both France and Algeria.

== Opinions ==
Brahim says that he is not looking for the production of influence or supernatural creativity, but rather writing that is close to real things, writing between speech and silence. The beloved speech of the West, and the silence preferred by the East. Brahim also believes that the Arab revolutions are necessary, but they are not sufficient. Rather, there must be revolutions in all fields, including literature, poetry, music, painting, cinema, and that any society that has missed these things from the social landscape scene, instead, terrorism and death.

Brahim Metiba published the novel "I Don’t Have Time to Gossip with You" for Mukund Publications, a novel in which he dealt with a love story and an impossible dialogue between a boy and his mother. Inspired by real events through the story of the narrator's father who came to France to visit his son. After leaving, he left him a trip address, or in other words, he left some words for him on the table before returning to Algeria "I did not have time to chat with you". The work explains the absence of communication between the boy and his father and, as a result of the reality between countries, reflects it between Algeria and France.

== List of his works ==
Here is a list of the author's most notable works:

- My Mother and I, (Arabic: 'umiy wa'ana).
- I don't have time to gossip with you, (Arabic: lis ladaya alwaqt liltharthara maeak) written in French language.

== Awards ==
Algerian writer Brahim Metiba won the "beur fm méditerranée, (English: Pir FM Prize for Mediterranean)” award in the 2016 edition organized in the framework of the Salon of the Moroccan Book Fair in Paris, which closed its 22nd curtain in 2016. Among the participation of Algerian writers, led by novelists Amin Zaoui, Rabia Djelti, Miloud Yabrir and others.

In this edition, Brahim was crowned with the exhibition awards called "Pir FM Prize for Mediterranean" given to the writer Franco-Maghrebi, for his novel "I don’t have time to gossip with you" written in French, where he dedicated his victory to his father and mother.
