= Texenna District =

Coordinates: 36.6606°N 5.7910°E

Texenna District دائرة تاكسانة
- District
- Map of Algeria highlighting Jijel Province

- Map of Jijel Province highlighting Texenna District
- Country: Algeria
- Province: Jijel
- District seat: Texenna

Area
  - Total: 177.71 km^{2} (68.61 sq mi)

Population (1998)
  - Total: 36,413
  - Density: 204.90/km^{2} (530.69/sq mi)
- Time zone: UTC+01 (CET)
- Municipalities: 2

Texenna is a district in Jijel Province, Algeria. It was named after its capital, Texenna.

== Municipalities ==
The district is further divided into 2 municipalities:

- Texenna
- Kaous
