= Texenna =

Coordinates: 36°39′N 5°47′E

- Commune and town
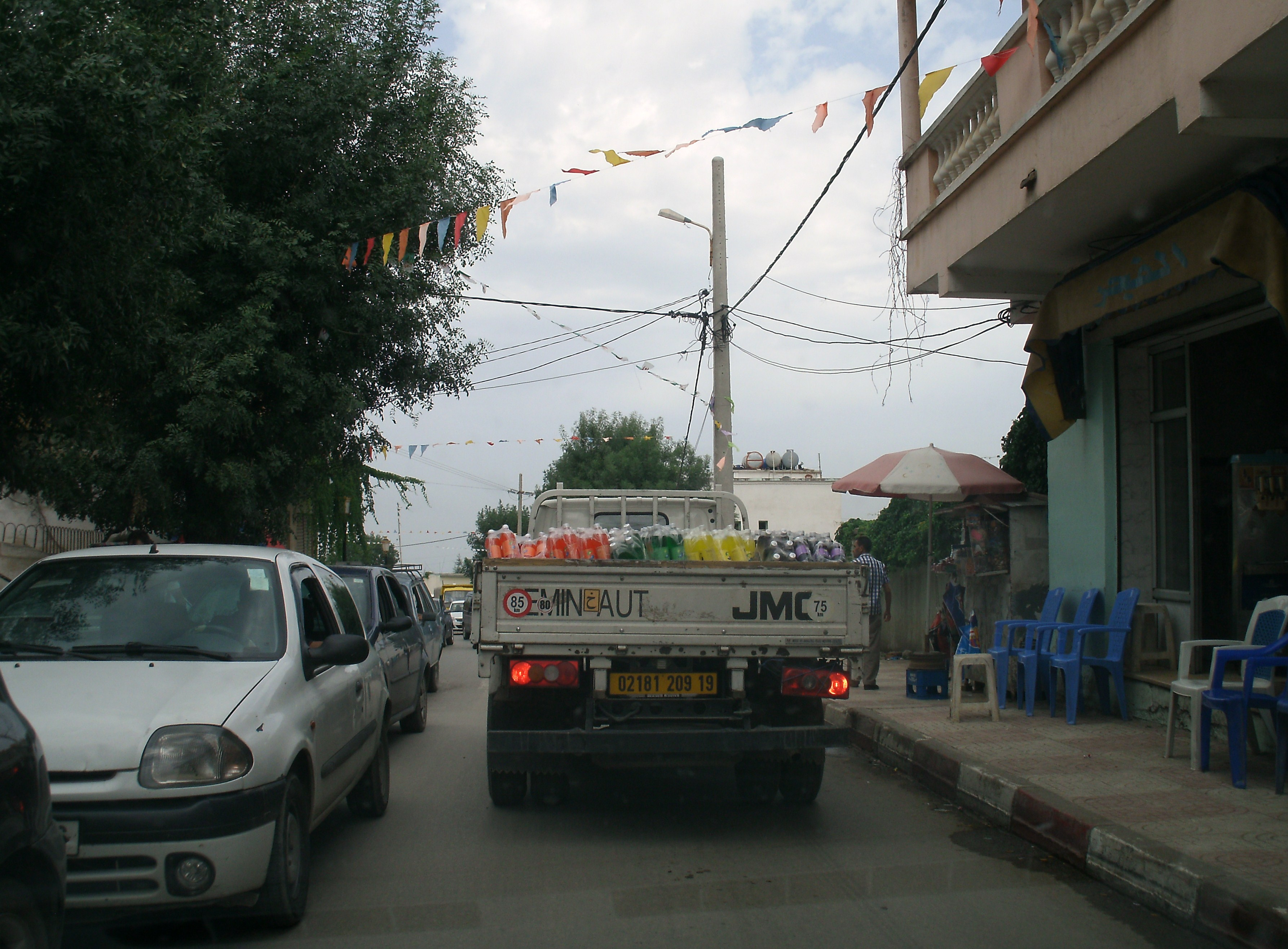

- Country: Algeria
- Province: Jijel Province
- District: Texenna District

Population (1998)
  - Total: 14,974
- Time zone: UTC+1 (CET)

Texenna is a town and commune in Jijel Province, Algeria. According to the 1998 census it has a population of 14,974.
