= Nouria Benghabrit-Remaoun =

Algerian sociologist, researcher, and politician

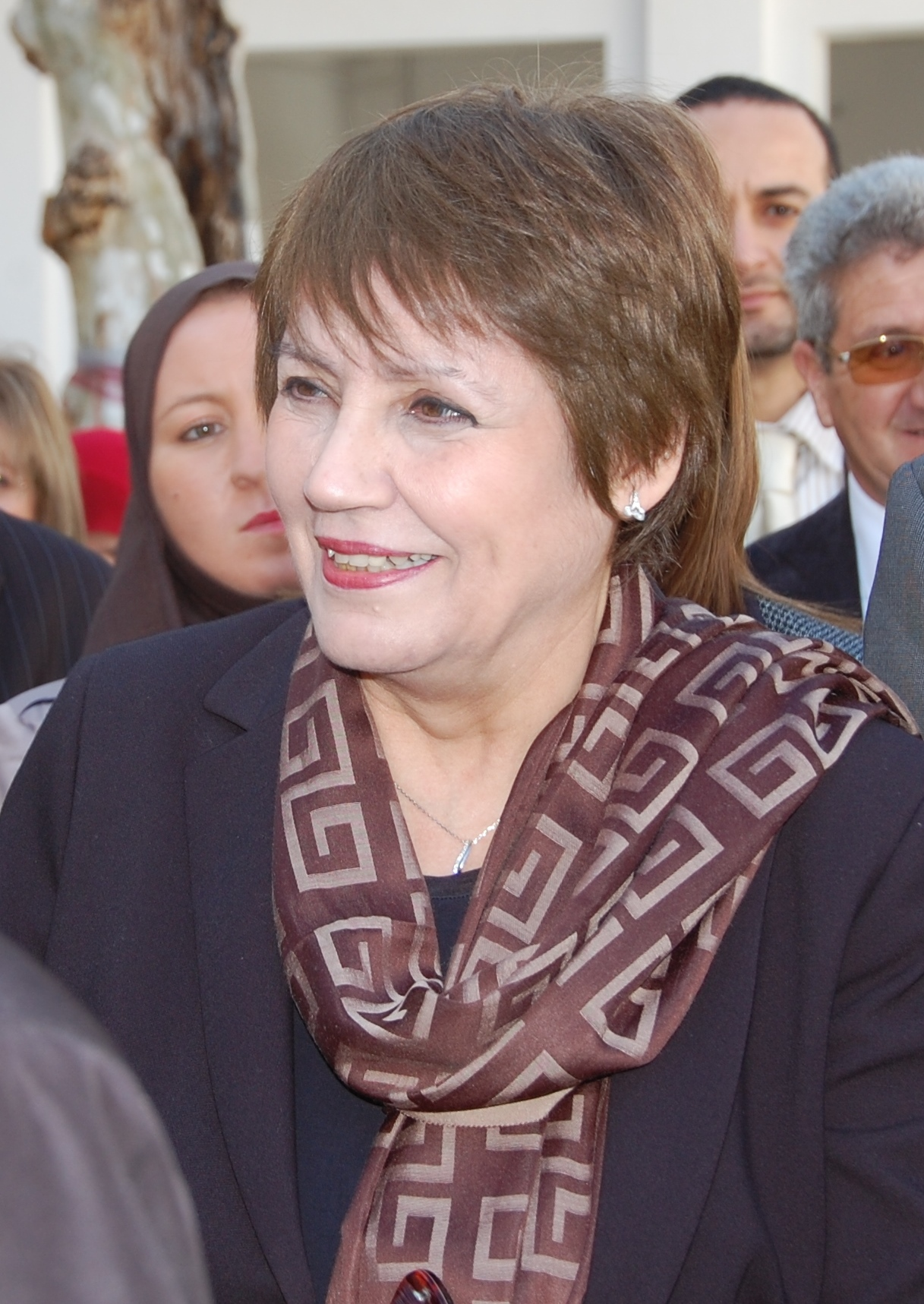

Minister of National Education
- In office 5 May 2015 – 31 March 2019
- President: Abdelaziz Bouteflika
- Prime Minister: Abdelmalek Sellal
- Preceded by: Abdelatif Baba Ahmed
- Succeeded by: Abdelhakim Belabed

Personal details
- Education: University of Oran Paris Descartes University
- Profession: Researcher

Nouria Benghabrit-Remaoun (born 5 March 1952) is an Algerian sociologist and researcher. Previously she had served in the government of Algeria as Minister of National Education.

Her previous function was director of the National Centre of Research in Social and Cultural Anthropology. She was a member of The Committee for Development Policy (CDP), subsidiary body of the United Nations Economic and Social Council.

According to The Economist, as education minister, she favours the use of Darija as the language of education in Algeria.

She is the granddaughter of Si Kaddour Benghabrit's brother.
