= Abdelhakim Belabed =

Algerian politician

Abdelhakim Belaabed
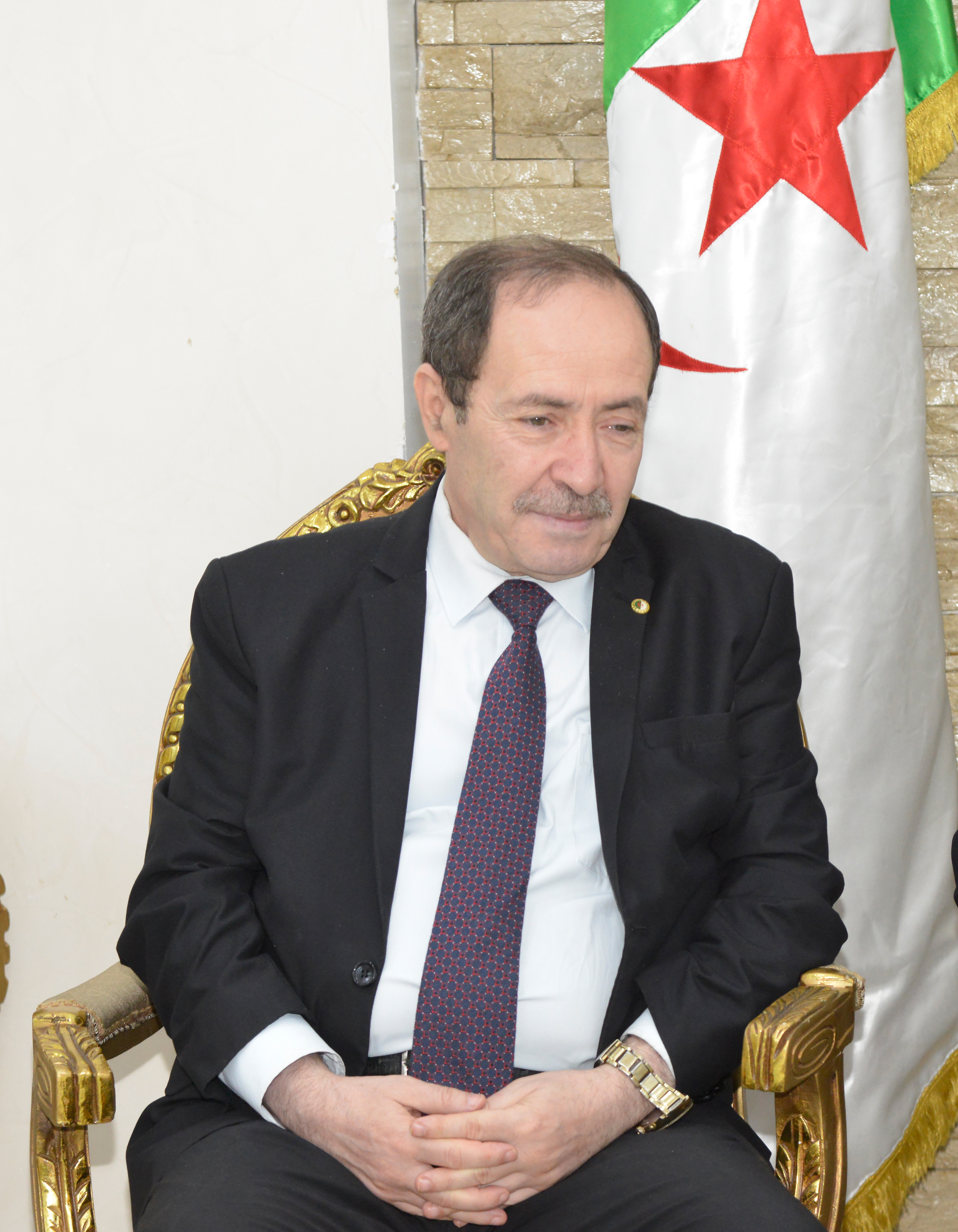

Minister of National Education
- Incumbent
- Assumed office 31 March 2019
- President: Abdelmadjid Tebboune
- Prime Minister: Nadir Larbaoui; Aymen Benabderrahmane; Abdelaziz Djerad; Noureddine Bedoui
- Preceded by: Nouria Benghabrit-Remaoun

Personal details
- Born: 1964 (age 61–62)

Abdelhakim Belaabed (born 1964) is the Algerian Minister of National Education. He was appointed as minister on 31 March 2019.

== Fonctions ==
- From 2021: Minister of National Education
- President of the National Commission for Education, Science and Culture
- 2019–2020: Minister of National Education
- 2015–2019: Secretary General of the Ministry of National Education (MNE)
- 2013–2015: Chief of Cabinet of the Ministry of National Education
- Director of Studies – General Secretariat – MNE.
- Advisor to the Minister of National Education – MNE.
- Human Resources Manager- MNE.
- Information Systems Manager DSI – MNE.
- Deputy Director of Infrastructure and Equipment Standardization – MNE.
- Deputy Director of Planning and School Mapping – MNE.
- Director of Guidance, Evaluation, Training, and Examinations – Academic Inspection of the Province of Algiers.
- Director General of the National Office for Literacy and Adult Education (NOLAE).
- Head of the Examinations and Competitions Department.
- Engineering Professor.

== Education ==
Belaabed holds a Bachelor in Informatics (1988).
