= Belkassem Ben Sedira =

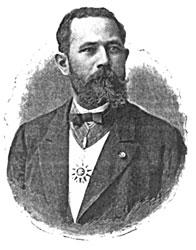
- Born: Belkassem Ben Sedira; 30 November 1844; Biskra
- Died: 30 November 1901 (aged 57); Sidi M'Hamed
- Writing career
- Years active: 1879–1893
- Genre: Language
- Notable works: Cours de langues Kabyle; Dialogues français-arabes

Belkassem Ben Sedira, born in Biskra on November 30, 1844 and died in Sidi M'Hamed on November 30, 1901, was a professor at the Higher School of Letters in Algiers, writer and researcher in Darija (the Algerian Arabic dialect), during the French presence in Algeria.

== Family ==
Ben Sdira's family is of Chaoui origin from Biskra.

== Biography ==
Between 1860 and 1863, Belkassem obtained a scholarship and was sent by the Governor General Edmond-Charles de Martimprey to the École Normale in Versailles. The young 21-year-old Ben Sdira was appointed as a professor at the École Normale in Algiers.

In 1882, Belkassem was appointed to the Court of Appeal because of his knowledge of local customs and his mastery of Arabic with its different variants and Berber languages. He was the author of several works to popularize Algerian Arabic and Kabyle.

He began studying Kabyle and the Kabylie region in 1886, after being tasked by Governor General Louis Tirman to collect tales, riddles, fables, songs, and legends from the region and to facilitate the study of the Kabyle language, near the Kabyle tribes of Djurdjura and the Soummam Valley. Belkassem Ben Sedira was among the first to use Latin characters to transcribe the Kabyle language.

He is the grandfather of singer Leïla Ben Sedira.

== Honors ==
- Commandeur de l'ordre du Nichan Iftikhar
- Chevalier de la Légion d'honneur en 1893

== Writings ==
- Ben Sedira, Belkassem (1879). Cours de litterature arabe (in French). Alger.
- Ben Sedira, Belkassem (1872). Dialogues français-arabes, recueil des phrases les plus usuelles de la langue parlée en Algérie (in French). Alger: Adolphe Jourdan. p. 328.
- Ben Sedira, Belkassem. Dictionnaire français-arabe de la langue parlée en Algérie (in French). Alger. p. 790.
- Ben Sedira, Belkassem. Manuel epistolaire de Langue Arabe a l'usage des Lycees, colleges et ecoles normales de l'Algerie (in French). Alger. p. 272.
- Ben Sedira, Belkassem (1882). Petit dictionnaire arabe-français de la langue parlée en Algérie contenant les mots et les formules employés dans les lettres et les actes judiciaires (in French). Alger: Adolphe Jourdan. p. 608.
- Ben Sedira, Belkassem (1883). Petite grammaire arabe de la langue parleé à l'ussage des Écoles primaires et des classes élémentaires dans les Lycées et Colléges de l'Algérie (in French). Alger: Adolphe Jourdan. p. 48.
