= Western Algerian Arabic =

Arabic dialect of Oran, Algeria

Western Algerian
- Northwestern Algerian Arabic; Oranese Arabic; Oranian Arabic
- Native to: Algeria
- Region: Central Maghreb
- Ethnicity: Algerian Arab-Berbers and Haratins
- Language family: Afro-Asiatic: Semitic; Central Semitic; Arabic; Maghrebi Arabic; Algerian Arabic; Western Algerian
- Writing system: Arabic script

Language codes
- ISO 639-3: –
- Glottolog: oran1236
- IETF: arq-u-sd-dz31

Western Algerian Arabic (also known as Northwestern Algerian Arabic, Oranese Arabic or Oranian Arabic; in Arabic: الوهرانية, romanized: al-wahrāniya) is a dialectal continuum of Algerian dialects Arabic, mainly spoken in Oran, Algeria.

It the western regional dialect of Algerian Arabic, belongs to the Maghrebi Arabic family, and marked by a Berber and Spanish substrates. As well it shares a rich vocabulary common with as the Maltese and the Tunisian Arabic. It has become known outside of Algeria, notably thanks to the Algerian folk music Raï since the 1980s.

== See also ==
- Algerian Arabic
