= Slimane Chikh =

Algerian politician

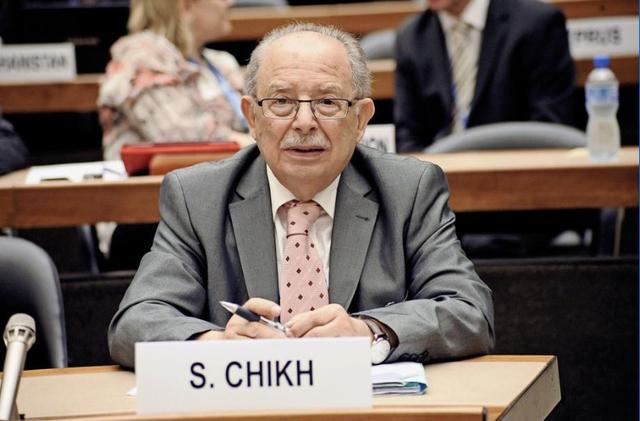
- Born: 13 July 1940 (age 85) Beni Isguen, Ghardaïa, Algeria
- Occupation: Historian, politician, diplomat
- Language: French, Arabic
- Genre: History

Slimane Chikh (sometimes spelled Cheikh or El Cheikh) (Arabic: سليمان الشيخ) is an Algerian historian, academic, and politician . A professor of political science, he has notably served as Rector of the University of Algiers, Minister of National Education, and Minister of Culture. He has also held the positions of Advisor to the President of the Republic, Senator, Algerian Ambassador to Egypt, and Permanent Representative of the Organization of Islamic Cooperation (OIC) to the United Nations (UN) in Geneva.

He is the author of several recognized books and articles on the political history of Algeria, in particular on the war of national liberation and Algeria's international relations.

== Biography ==
=== Origins and formation ===
Born in the M'zab region of southern Algeria, Slimane Chikh grew up in a family deeply committed to the national cause. He is the son of the Algerian poet and activist Moufdi Zakaria, a major figure in Maghreb nationalism. Slimane Chikh was educated in an environment where culture, history, and activism shaped his perspective.

After secondary studies at the Sadiki College of Khaznadar in Tunis, he joined the National Liberation Army (ALN) in 1961, where he was assigned to the political commissariat of the general staff (EMG) in Ghardimaou .

After independence, he pursued studies in law and political science in Algiers, then in Paris where he earned a law degree and a postgraduate diploma in political research and studies. In 1975, he defended his doctoral thesis in political science in Grenoble, entitled "The Algerian Revolution: Project and Action (1945–1962)." The core of this thesis is incorporated into his major work, " Algeria in Arms, or the Time of Certainties ."

Returning to Algeria after his studies, he began an academic career at the University of Algiers and then participated in the creation of history and social science departments .

=== Academic career ===
Slimane Chikh began teaching at the University of Algiers in 1968, where he conducted teaching and research in political science and contemporary history. From 1975 to 1978, he directed the Institute of Political Science and Information. He was appointed rector of the University of Algiers in the 1980s, a position in which he became involved in academic decisions and debates , .

His work focuses in particular on the analysis of Algerian foreign policy, the 1954 revolution, and the Maghreb's relations with sub-Saharan Africa and the Francophonie. He has taught abroad, notably at the University of Aix-en-Provence, Sciences Po Paris, and Laval University in Quebec City, Canada, and has published numerous articles in Algerian and international journals.

=== Political engagement and ministerial responsibilities ===
A former member of the ALN, Slimane Chikh held high political and governmental positions. He was called upon to serve in ministerial roles in various national government configurations :

- Minister of National Education (on several occasions, notably in the late 1980s and the 1990s in Gouvernement Kasdi Merbah ) and Gouvernement Ahmed Ouyahia;
- Minister of Culture (1994–1995) in Gouvernement Sifi I and Sifi II Mokdad Sifi;
- Advisor to the President of the Republic, Liamine Zéroual.

He was also a Senator.

=== Diplomatic career ===
Slimane Chikh represented Algeria internationally, notably as ambassador to Egypt. From 2010 to approximately 2015, he served as the Permanent Representative of the Organization of Islamic Cooperation (OIC) to the United Nations (UN) in Geneva. In this capacity, he addressed issues related to human rights, the fight against Islamophobia, and crises affecting Muslim countries.

== Works and publications ==
Slimane Chikh is the author of books and articles on Algerian political history and the revolution. His major work, studied by critics, is generally entitled " Algeria in Arms, or, The Time of Certainties " and has been reviewed in specialized journals. His work is cited in studies on the teaching of the war of liberation and on national legitimacies in Algeria , .

- Ibadism and society. The deliberation of the 'Azzaba of Beni Isguen (27 Ramadan 1399 = 20 August 1979) – Socio-religious study on the Ibadite community of the Mzab, presented within the framework of the work of the National Center for Research in Social and Cultural Anthropology (CRASC)
- Algeria in Arms or the Time of Certainties – Algiers: Casbah Editions, 1998.
- Maghreb and Francophonie – Paris: Economica, 1988 (collective work with Mahdi Elmandjra, Baccar Touzani)
- The Maghreb and Sub-Saharan Africa – Paris: Editions du Centre national de la recherche scientifique, 1980
- Algeria, gateway to Africa – Algiers: Casbah, 2000.
- The Algerian revolution: project and action (1954–1962) – France: Doctoral thesis, 1975.

== Sources ==
1. Le Monde, Le Monde, November 11, 1988 ( accessed October 28, 2025).
2. Charles-Robert Ageron, Outre-Mers. Revue d'histoire, vol. 70, no . 260,1983, pp. 201–202 (accessed April 3, 2026).
3. Echorouk Online, May 12, 2020 (accessed October 28, 2025) .
4. Charlotte Courreye, , Paris, Éditions de la Sorbonne, coll. “Historical Library of the Countries of Islam” ( no . 14),2020, 544 p. ( ISBN 979-1-035-10682-9 OCLC 1495380437 doi:10.4000/books.psorbonne.84519,), chap. 7 ("Legitimacies and Appropriations: Claiming the AOMA Legacy in a Fragmented Algeria (1980s–1990s)"), pp. 391–436.
5. Alain Jourdan, Tribune de Genève, March 2, 2015 (accessed October 28, 2025) .
6. MRIF / Quebec (accessed October 28, 2025) .
7. Hassan Remaoun, Tréma Review (OpenEdition) ( ISSN 2107-0997, doi:10.4000/trema.58, accessed October 28, 2025),pp. 5–19.
8. Revue Insaniyat – CRASC (consulted October 28, 2025)
