= Echorouk El Yawmi =

- Cover of the issue 5397 of Echorouk El Yawmi (March 14, 2017)
- Type: Daily newspaper
- Format: Tabloid
- Owner: Echorouk Group
- President: Ali Fodil
- Editor: Nasreddine Kacem
- Founded: 1990; 36 years ago (as Echorouk Al Arabi)
- Language: Arabic
- Headquarters: Abdelkader Sefir Press House, Kouba, Algiers
- City: Algiers
- Country: Algeria
- Website: www.echoroukonline.com

Echorouk or Ech Chorouk El Yawmi (Arabic: الشروق اليومي, romanized: aš-Šurūq al-Yawmi, lit. 'The Daily Dawn') is a daily newspaper in Algeria published Saturday to Thursday in the tabloid format. It is the second-largest daily Arabophone newspaper (after El Khabar).

== History ==
Echorouk El Yawmi was started in 1990 under the name of Echorouk Al Arabi. It is independent, and often critical of the government and the Islamist rebel movements which remain active after the Algerian Civil War. The newspaper also publishes Echorouk El Ousboui, a weekly supplement.

The newspaper's online version – Echorouk Online – was the third most visited website in 2010 in the MENA region.

In July 2015, Echorouk El Yawmi partnered with the British Council in Algeria to launch a competition to learn English. The newspaper used to publish a series of weekly articles in English from July 24 to August 20, 2015. Participants had to read the articles then answer the two asked questions on the newspaper's website, the British Council's website, or the Facebook page. The prizes were granted to five winners and were awarded in September in a ceremony held at the UK Ambassador's Residence in Algiers in presence of prominent personalities.

== 2006 Gaddafi affair ==
In a fall 2006 trial, the leader of neighbouring Libya, Muammar Gaddafi, took the unprecedented step of suing the paper in an Algerian court for defamation. The court decided on October 31 that Ech Chorouk's reporting of Gaddafi's attempts to induce Algerian Tuaregs to separatism had slandered the Libyan leader, and suspended the paper for two months. The editor and the responsible reporter were both sentenced to six months in jail. The verdict was condemned as a strike against press freedom by virtually the entire Algerian independent press and numerous political parties, as well as from international press watchdogs.
