= British Council in Algeria =

British cultural and educational organisation in Algeria

Coordinates: 36°45′24″N 3°1′29″E

British Council in Algeria المجلس الثقافي البريطاني في الجزائر
- Founded: 1962; 64 years ago (original); 2006; 20 years ago (relaunch)
- Founder: United Kingdom Government
- Type: Cultural Institution
- Headquarters: 40 Benali Abdellah Brothers Avenue (ex-Parmentier), Hydra, Algiers, Algeria
- Region served: Nationwide
- Product: British cultural and language education
- Owner: British Council
- Key people: Abderrahim Ait Bara (English language projects coordinator)
- Website: www.britishcouncil.dz

The British Council in Algeria (Arabic: المجلس الثقافي البريطاني في الجزائر) is a British organisation specialising in cultural and educational opportunities in Algeria. It works in the country promoting a wider knowledge of the United Kingdom and the English language; encouraging cultural, scientific, technological and educational co-operation between the two countries and promoting British culture, education and society.

== History ==
In 1934, the British Foreign Office officials created the British Committee for Relations with Other Countries to "support English education abroad, promote British culture and fight the rise of fascism". The name quickly became British Council for Relations with Other Countries and was then, in 1936, officially shortened to British Council. With Algeria's independence in 1962, the British Council opened its first office in Algiers, but closed in 1994 due to the security situation in the country. In 2006, the British Council reopened in Algiers with operations commencing in 2007.

In July 2015, the British Council in Algeria partnered with Echorouk El Yawmi to launch a competition to learn English. The newspaper used to publish a series of weekly articles in English from July 24 to August 20, 2015. Participants had to read the articles then answer the two asked questions on the British Council's website, the newspaper's website or the Facebook page. The prizes were granted to five winners and were awarded in September in a ceremony held at the UK Ambassador's Residence in Algiers in presence of prominent personalities.

== Activity ==
Much of what the British Council does in Algeria has an international dimension involving countries in North Africa and the Middle East such as Connecting Classrooms, Skills for Employability and Active Citizens. It works with Algerian organisations, be they governmental or non-governmental, to develop various programs, especially in the area of English and education. It also organises arts and cultural activities with local partners.

== See also ==
- British Council
- Teaching English as a foreign language (TEFL)
- Embassy of Algeria, London
