= Patuet =

Dialect of Catalan once spoken in Algeria

- pataouète
- patuet
- Native to: French Algeria
- Ethnicity: Pied-noir
- Era: French Algeria
- Language family: Indo-European: Italic; Latino-Faliscan; Latin; Romance; Italo-Western; Western Romance; Gallo-Iberian?; Gallo-Romance (Note: Some Iberian scholars may alternatively classify Catalan as Iberian Romance.); Occitano-Romance; Catalan; Patuet
- Early forms: Proto-Romance: Old Occitan; Old Catalan; Catalan
- Writing system: French alphabet

Language codes
- ISO 639-3: –
- IETF: ca-DZ

Patuet (from the French pataouète) is the dialect of the Catalan language that was spoken in the Maghreb, mainly in Algeria, during the French administration. Mainly of Menorca, Alacant and Roussillon origin, it was characterized by French and Arabic influences and, in turn, influenced the French slang of the pied-noir. After the Pieds-noirs exodus that followed the independence of Algeria, in 1962, most of the population was dispersed throughout France (majority), Roussillon and a minority in the province of Alicante, Spain. The Fort-de-l'Eau Neighborhood Association holds an annual meeting of Algerians of Menorcan descent in the Provencal commune of L'Isle-sur-la-Sorgue. In 2001, some participants in the event still spoke Patuet.

== History ==
France occupied Algiers in 1830, and declared Algeria a French territory in 1848. From the first years, a European migratory current towards Algeria began. Among the emigrants, on the one hand, the people from Alicante who settled around Oran stood out, and on the other, the Menorcans who settled around Algiers, coinciding with the Roussillons. In 1889, an automatic naturalization law granted French citizenship to all foreigners of European origin. In 1896 the Catalan-speaking population of Algeria exceeded 60,000 people and in 1911 it probably exceeded 100,000. After World War I, the migratory flow stabilized, except for a brief period of refugees from the Spanish Civil War.

Menorcan emigrants were mainly agricultural settlers, who became the majority in some towns. In 1834 Algiers already had a rue de Mahon. Between 1830 and 1850 some 9,500 people emigrated from Menorca, when the population of the island was about 39,000. In 1850, 45 Menorcan families founded the town of Fort-de-l'Eau (today with the Arabized name of Bordj El Kiffan) where Catalan was preserved for more than a hundred years, and in 1853, Aïn Taya was founded by 967 Menorcans. In the populations where they are the majority, social cohesion is maintained and the customs and language that is transmitted to children and grandchildren are maintained. Even the Algerian and French workers in the Menorcan lands spoke Catalan. In 1962, with the independence of Algeria and subsequent anti-European pogroms, they fled en masse, settling mainly in Roussillon and Languedoc.

The community of Alicante origin came from the counties of Camp d'Alacant, Baix Vinalopó, Marina Alta and Marina Baixa. It was mainly temporary and did not maintain a great cohesion, but it preserved the typical speech of the Alicante Marinas influenced by French and Arabic, and came to publish, at the end of the 19th century, some newspapers with French spelling: Journal de Cagayous and el Patuet. According to the official Algerian census of 1896, there were 56,000 inhabitants of Alicante origin residing there. In Oran, Xicoteta Alacant ("Little Alacant") was created, and colloquial phrases such as salut i força al canut ("health and strength to the joint") were in common use among the non-Catalan-speaking population. In 1962, some 40,000 pied-noirs took refuge in the Valencian Community, mostly in the southern regions, quickly blurring their peculiarities.

Among the emigrants who came from France were also from Roussillon, some of them as civil servants, who joined the Catalan-speaking community of Algiers. On the other hand, the theory that the language had a previous historical basis and that it was already spoken by the Moriscos expelled by the Spanish king in 1610 and who settled in the Spanish outpost in Oran requires investigation. Oran already had a Jewish population of Majorcan origin, which suggests the existence of Catalan as a spoken language in the north of what is now Algeria since at least the 14th century.
