= Districts of Algeria =

Daïras (Algeria)

The provinces of Algeria are divided into 547 districts (Algerian Arabic: دَوَائِر). The administrative centre of a district is a district seat. Each district is further divided into one or more communes of Algeria.

Algiers Province, the national capital, is the only city in the country which is divided into districts (and municipalities), and the only one which is a province itself. This means that its neighborhoods and suburbs have the same status as those of smaller cities or villages elsewhere in the country. The administration of a district is assigned to a district chief (chef de daïra) who is chosen by the Algerian president. The district chief, like the wilaya chief, is an unelected political position.

Algeria's districts were created as arrondissements when Algeria was a colony of France, and they had a status equal to those of metropolitan France. They were, like France's arrondissements, part of départements, which are further part of a région (which was called a territory, territoire, in French Algeria). They were maintained for six years after the country's independence (until 1968), when they were renamed "daïras" and their functions slightly changed.

== See also ==
- Provinces of Algeria
- Municipalities of Algeria
