= Algerian Sign Language =

Deaf sign language of Algeria

- Native to: Algeria
- Native speakers: 240,000 (2008)
- Language family: French Sign: Algerian Sign Language

Language codes
- ISO 639-3: asp
- Glottolog: alge1235

Algerian Sign Language (Arabic: لغة الإشارة الجزائرية, romanized: Lughatu l-'Ishāratu l-Jazāʼirīyatu; Berber languages: ⵜⵓⵜⵍⴰⵢⵜ ⵜⴰⴷⵓⴳⴰⵎⵜ ⵏ ⴷⵣⴰⵢⵔ, romanized: Tutlayt Tadugamt n Dzayer; French: Langue des signes algérienne) is the sign language most commonly used in Algeria. It was officially recognized by the Algerian law on the protection and promotion of persons with a disability enacted on May 8, 2002. It is also used in Oujda, Morocco, near the border, or at least the local sign language has been strongly influenced by it.
