= Permanent Committee on Geographical Names for British Official Use =

The Permanent Committee on Geographical Names (PCGN) is an independent inter-departmental body in the United Kingdom established in 1919.

== History ==
The preliminary conference of representatives of the admiralty, War Office, India Office, Colonial Office, and the RGS was held at Lowther Lodge on 24 April 1919. The formation of a committee was recommended by the conference.

== Function ==
The committee's function is to establish standard names for places outside the UK (excluding those of the Antarctic), for the use of the British government. The committee has collaborated with the Foreign Names Committee of the United States Board on Geographic Names to agree a joint romanization system, first published in 1994 as the Romanization Systems and Roman-Script Spelling Conventions.

== Members ==
The members of the PCGN are: British Broadcasting Corporation Monitoring Service, Intelligence Collection Group (ICG) (formerly Defence Geospatial Intelligence), Defence Intelligence Staff, Foreign and Commonwealth Office, Government Communications Headquarters, Hydrographic Office, Ordnance Survey, Royal Geographical Society and Royal Scottish Geographical Society.

== Finance ==
A third of the costs of the PCGN are met by the Foreign and Commonwealth Office (FCO) and two thirds by the Ministry of Defence. In answer to a parliamentary question in 2007, the cost of the PCGN to the FCO was disclosed as being £59,826.83 for the 2005/2006 financial year. This results in a total cost in that financial year of £179,480.49.

== See also ==
- United States Board on Geographic Names (BGN)
