= Algerian Arabic =

Maghrebi dialect of the Arabic language spoken in Algeria

- Darja, Dziria
- الدارجة الجزائرية
- Native to: Algeria
- Region: Central Maghreb
- Ethnicity: Algerians, also used as a second language by other ethnic groups in Algeria
- Speakers: L1: 36 million (2022); L2: 5.7 million (2022); Total: 42 million (2022)
- Language family: Afro-Asiatic: Semitic; West Semitic; Central Semitic; Arabic; Maghrebi; Algerian Arabic
- Dialects: Western Algerian Arabic; Eastern Algerian Arabic
- Writing system: Arabic script

Language codes
- ISO 639-3: arq
- Glottolog: alge1239
- Arabic family. Algerian (in Pink)

Reda speaking Algerian Arabic.

Algerian Arabic (Standard Arabic: الدارجة الجزائرية, romanized: ad-dārija al-jazāʾiriyya), natively known as Dziria or Darja, is a variety of Arabic spoken in Algeria. It belongs to the Maghrebi Arabic dialect continuum and is mostly intelligible with the Tunisian and Moroccan dialects. Darja (الدارجة) means 'everyday/colloquial dialect'.

Like other varieties of Maghrebi Arabic, Algerian Arabic has a mostly Semitic vocabulary. In a 2014 study transcribing a corpus of several thousand Algerian Arabic words, about 20% of them were written identically to their Modern Standard Arabic equivalents, and some 34% differed by exactly one letter. The remainder differed by more than one letter - a category that contained both Arabic-derived words and loanwords from other languages. It contains Berber, Punic, and African Romance influences and has some loanwords from French, Andalusi Arabic, Ottoman Turkish and Spanish. Berber loanwords represent 8% to 9% of its vocabulary.

== Use ==
Modern Standard Arabic (MSA) is generally reserved for official use and education, while Algerian Arabic is the native dialect of 75% to 80% of Algerians and is mastered by 85% to 100% of them. It is a spoken language used in daily communication and entertainment. As in the rest of the Arab world, this linguistic situation has been described as diglossia: MSA is nobody's first acquired language; it is learned through formal instruction rather than transmission from parent to child.

Besides informal communication, Algerian Arabic is rarely written. In 2008, The Little Prince was translated in Algerian Arabic. The first novel written in Algerian Arabic is published by Rabeh Sebaa in 2021 and is entitled Fahla (in Latin script and Arabic characters).

== Dialects ==
The classification of dialects in Algeria is made particularly difficult due to the geography of Algeria, allowing pockets of isolated speakers to form, as well as the mixing of dialects in urban centers, creating a "koine" for each city.

However, the Arabic dialects can still be divided into two genetically different groups: pre-Hilalian and Hilalian dialects.

=== Hilalian dialects ===
Hilalian dialects of Algeria belong to three linguistic groups:

- Eastern Hilal dialects: includes three main groups: Sétif-Batna, Mila-Skikda (includes Constantine), and Annaba-Tébessa-Biskra.
- Central Hilal dialects: of central and southern Algeria, includes two clusters: Chlef-Médéa and Tipaza-Boumerdès (includes Algiers).
- Mâqil dialects: spoken in the western part of Oranais (noted for the third singular masculine accusative pronoun h, for example, /ʃʊfteh/ (I saw him), which would be /ʃʊftʊ/ in other dialects).

Modern koine languages, urban and national, are based mainly on Hilalian dialects.

=== Pre-Hilalian dialects ===
Pre-Hilalian Arabic dialects are generally classified into three types: Urban, "Village" Sedentary, and Jewish dialects. Several Pre-Hilalian dialects are spoken in Algeria:

- Urban dialects can be found in all of Algeria's big cities. Urban dialects were formerly also spoken in other cities, such as Azemmour and Mascara, Algeria, where they are no longer used.
- The Jijel Arabic (or Jijeli Dialect) is spoken in the triangular area north of Constantine, including Collo and Jijel (it is noteworthy for its pronunciation of [q] as [k] and [t] as [ts] and characterized, such as other Eastern pre-Hilalian dialects, by the preservation of the three short vowels).
- The traras-Msirda dialect is spoken in the area north of Tlemcen, including the eastern Traras, Rachgoun and Honaine (it is noted for its pronunciation of [q] as [k]);
- Judeo-Algerian Arabic is no longer spoken after Algerian Jews left Algeria in 1962.

== Phonology ==
=== Consonants ===
Consonant phonemes of Algerian Arabic
		Labial		Dental/Alveolar		Palatal	Velar	Uvular	Pharyngeal	Glottal
		plain	emphatic	plain	emphatic	Palatal	Velar	Uvular	Pharyngeal	Glottal
Nasal		m	(mˤ)	n	(nˤ)					
Occlusive	voiceless	(p)		t	tˤ		k	q		(ʔ)
Occlusive	voiced	b	(bˤ)	d	dˤ		ɡ			
Affricate	voiceless					(t͡ʃ) ^{1}				
Affricate	voiced					d͡ʒ				
Fricative	voiceless	f		s	sˤ	ʃ		χ	ħ	h
Fricative	voiced	(v)		z	zˤ	ʒ		ʁ	ʕ	
Trill				r	rˤ					
Approximant				l	ɫ	j	w			

In comparison to other Maghrebi dialects, Algerian Arabic has retained numerous phonetic elements of Classical Arabic lost by its relatives; In the Algiers dialect, the letters /ðˤ/ ظ, /ð/ ذ, and ث /θ/ are not used, they are in most cases pronounced as the graphemes ض, د, and ت respectively. This conservatism concerning pronunciation is in contrast to Algerian Arabic grammar which has shifted noticeably. In terms of differences from Classical Arabic, the previous /r/ and /z/ phonemes have developed contrastive glottalized forms and split into /r/ and /rˤ/; and /z/ and /zˤ/. Additionally, /q/ from Classical Arabic has split into /q/ and /ɡ/ in most dialects. The phonemes /v/ and /p/ which are not common in Arabic dialects arise almost exclusively from (predominantly French) loanwords.

^1 The voiceless "Ch" (t͡ʃ) is used in some words in the Algerian dialect like "تشينا" /t͡ʃinaː/ (orange) or "تشاراك" /t͡ʃaːraːk/ (A kind of Algerian sweet) and it is largely seen in Eastern Hilal dialects.

==== Dissimilation ====
A study of Northwestern Algerian Arabic (specifically around Oran) showed that laterals /l/ or /ɫ/ or the nasal consonant /n/ would be dissimilated into either /n/ in the case of /l/ or /ɫ/; or /l/ or /ɫ/ in the case of /n/ when closely preceding a corresponding lateral or nasal consonant. Thus /zəlzla/ (earthquake) has become /zənzla/, conversely /lʁənmi/ "mutton" becomes /lʁəlmi/.

==== Assimilation ====
The same study also noted numerous examples of assimilation in Northwestern Algerian Arabic, due to the large consonant clusters created from all of the historical vowel deletion: examples include /dəd͡ʒaːd͡ʒ/ "chicken", becoming /d͡ʒaːd͡ʒ/ and /mliːħ/ "good", becoming /mniːħ/. An example of assimilation that occurs after the short vowel deletion is the historical /dərˤwŭk/ "now" becoming /drˤuːk/ and then being assimilated to /duːk/, illustrating the order in which the rules of Algerian Arabic may operate.

=== Vowels ===
Monophthong phonemes of Algerian Arabic
	Short			Long	
	Front	Central	Back	Front	Back
Close	ə		u	iː	uː
Mid	ə				
Open	ə			aː	

The phonemic vowel inventory of Algerian Arabic consists of three long vowels: /iː/, /uː/, and /aː/ contrasted with two short vowels: /u/ and /ə/. Algerian Arabic Vowels retains a great deal of features in relation to Classical Arabic Arabic phonology, namely the continued existence of 3 long vowels: /iː/, /uː/, and /aː/, Algerian Arabic also retains the short close back vowel /u/ in speech, however the short equivalents of /iː/ and /aː/ have fused in modern Algerian Arabic, creating a single phoneme /ə/. Also notable among the differences between Classical Arabic and Algerian Arabic is the deletion of short vowels entirely from open syllables and thus word final positions, which creates a stark distinction between written Classical Arabic, and casually written Algerian Arabic. One point of interest in Algerian Arabic that sets it apart from other conservative Arabic dialects is its preservation of phonemes in (specifically French) loanwords that would otherwise not be found in the language: /ɔ̃/, /y/, and /ɛ/ are all preserved in French loanwords such as /syʁ/ (French: 'sûre', English: 'sure') or /kɔnɛksiɔ̃/ (connection).

== Grammar ==
=== Nouns and adjectives ===
English	Algerian Arabic
drink	šrab
sky	sma
water	ma
woman / women	mra / nsa
fire	nar
big	kbir
man / men	rajel / rjal
day	nhar / yum
moon	qmer
night	lil
bread	khubz / kesra
small	ṣγir
Turtle	Fekrun
sand	rmel
winter / rain	šta / mṭar / nu
ball	balun
towel	serbita
toilet / bathroom	bit-el-ma / bit-er-raḥa / Twalat

=== Conjunctions and prepositions ===
English	Algerian Arabic	Notes of usage
but	beṣṣaḥ , emeṣṣaḥ	
if	ila, ida, lakan, kun, Fihalat	used for impossible conditions and comes just before the verb
if	lukan, kun	for possible conditions, Also used is "ida" and "kan"
so that, that	baš, bah	
that	belli	
as if	ki šγul, tquši, tqul, tgul	
because	xaṭar, xaṭrakeš, εlaxaṭer, εlajal	
when	ila / wakta / winta / Ki (used for some cases like : when you come I'll tell you)	
before	qbel ma / gbel ma	used before verbs
without	bla ma / blach	used before verbs
whether	kaš ma	used before verbs
under	taḥt	
over, on top of	fuq or fug	
after	mur / mura / Baεd / wra	
before	qbel / gbel	used only for time
next to, beside	quddam or guddam	is also used "ḥda" / "baḥda"
at	εend / εla	
with	mεa	
among, between	bin, binat (plural)	
same as, as much as	εla ḥsab, qed, ged, kima	amount
oh, oh so much	ya, ah	

Some of them can be attached to the noun, just like in other Arabic dialects. The word for in, "fi", can be attached to a definite noun. For example, the word for a house has a definite form "ed-dar" but with "fi", it becomes "fed-dar".

==== Gender ====
Algerian Arabic uses two genders for words: masculine and feminine. Masculine nouns and adjectives generally end with a consonant while the feminine nouns generally end with an a.

Examples:

- [rɑfiːq chbab] "Rafik is beautiful(male)", [zɑjnɑb chabba] "Zeyneb is beautiful(female)".

Verbs usually have an "i" when directed towards a female, Although in some dialects (Eastern Hilal dialect for example), the same verb ending with an "i" is used for both females and males.

Examples:

- [/waːʃ kliːt ljuːm/] "What did you eat today?(male)", [/waːʃ kliːti ljuːm/] "What did you eat today?(either female or both female and male depending on the dialect)".

==== Pluralisation ====
Hilalian dialects, on which the modern koine is based, often use regular plural while the wider use of the broken plural is characteristic to pre-Hilalian dialects.

The regular masculine plural is formed with the suffix -in, which derives from the Classical Arabic genitive and accusative ending -īna rather than the nominative -ūna:

mumen (believer) → mumnin

For feminine nouns, the regular plural is obtained by suffixing -at:

Classical Arabic: bint (girl) → banat
Algerian Arabic: bent → bnat

The broken plural can be found for some plurals in Hilalian dialects, but it is mainly used, for the same words, in pre-Hilalian dialects:

Broken plural: ṭabla → ṭwabəl.

=== Article ===
The article el is indeclinable and expresses a definite state of a noun of any gender and number. It is also prefixed to each of that noun's modifying adjectives.

It follows the sun and moon letters rules of Classical Arabic: if the word starts with one of these consonants, el is assimilated and replaced by the first consonant:

t, d, r, z, s, š, ṣ, ḍ, ṭ, l, n.

Examples:

rajel → er-rajel "man" (assimilation)
qeṭṭ → el-qeṭṭ "cat" (no assimilation)

Important Notes:

- When lunar letters are followed by consonants, the article le- is used.

Examples:

qmer → le-qmer "moon"
ḥjer → le-ḥjer "stone"

- The article el is always used with words that begin with vowels.

Examples:

alf → el-alf "thousand"

=== Verbs ===
Verbs are conjugated by adding affixes (prefixes, postfixes, both or none) that change according to the tense.

In all Algerian Arabic dialects, there is no gender differentiation of the second and third person in the plural forms, nor is there gender differentiation of the second person in the singular form in pre-Hilalian dialects. Hilalian dialects preserve the gender differentiation of the singular second person.

Person	Past		Present	
Person	Singular	Plural	Singular	Plural
1st	t	na	n -	n(e) - u
2nd (m)	t	tu	t -	t - u
2nd (f)	ti	tu	t - i	t - u
3rd (m)	-	u	i/y(e) -	i/y(e) - u
3rd (f)	t	u	t(e) -	i/y(e) - u

- Example with the verb kteb "To write":

Person	Past		Present	
Person	Singular	Plural	Singular	Plural
1st (m)	ktebt	ktebna	nekteb	nekketbu
2nd (m)	ktebt	ktebtu	tekteb	tekketbu
2nd (f)	ktebti	ktebtu	tekketbi	tekketbu
3rd (m)	kteb	ketbu	yekteb	yekketbu
3rd (f)	ketbet	ketbu	tekteb	yekketbu

Person	Past		Present		Future		Present continuous	
Person	Singular	Plural	Singular	Plural	Singular	Plural	Singular	Plural
1st (m)	ktebt	ktebna	nekteb	nekketbu	Rayeḥ nekteb	Rayḥin nekketbu	Rani nekteb	Rana nekketbu
1st (f)	ktebt	ktebna	nekteb	nekketbu	Rayḥa nekteb	Rayḥin nekketbu	Rani nekteb	Rana nekketbu
2nd (m)	ketbt	ktebtu	tekteb	tekketbu	Rayeḥ tekteb	Rayḥin tekketbu	Rak tekteb	Rakum tekketbu
2nd (f)	ktebti	ktebtu	tekketbi	tekketbu	Rayḥa tekketbi	Rayḥin tekketbu	Raki tekketbi	Rakum tekketbu
3rd (m)	kteb	ketbu	yekteb	yekketbu	Rayeḥ yekteb	Rayḥin yekketbu	Rah yekteb	Rahum yekketbu
3rd (f)	ketbet	ketbu	tekteb	yekketbu	Rayḥa tekteb	Rayḥin yekketbu	Raha tekteb	Rahum yekketbu

=== Future tense ===
Speakers generally do not use the future tense above. Used instead is the present tense or present continuous.

Also, as is used in all of the other Arabic dialects, there is another way of showing active tense. The form changes the root verb into an adjective. For example, "kteb" he wrote becomes "kateb".

=== Negation ===
Like all North African Arabic varieties (including Maltese and Egyptian Arabic), along with some Levantine Arabic varieties, verbal expressions are negated by enclosing the verb with all its affixes, along with any adjacent pronoun-suffixed preposition, within the circumfix ma ...-š (/ʃ/):

- « lεebt » ("I played") → « ma lεebt-š /ʃ/ » ("I didn't play")
- « ma tṭabbaεni-š » ("Don't push me")
- « ma yṭawlu-l-ek-š hadu le-qraεi » ("Those bottles won't last you long")
- « ma sibt-š plaṣa » ("I couldn't get a seat / parking place")

Person	Past		Present		Future		Present continuous	
Person	Singular	Plural	Singular	Plural	Singular	Plural	Singular	Plural
1st (m)	ma ktebt-š	ma ktebna-š	ma nekteb-š	ma nekketbu-š	ma Rayeḥ-š nekteb	ma Rayḥin-š nekketbu	ma Rani-š nekteb	ma Rana-š nekketbu
2nd (f)	ma ktebt-š	ma ktebna-š	ma nekteb-š	ma nekketbu-š	ma Rayḥa-š nekteb	ma Rayḥin-š nekketbu	ma Rani-š nekteb	ma Rana-š nekketbu
2nd (m)	ma ketbt-š	ma ktebtu-š	ma tekteb-š	ma tekketbu-š	ma Rayeḥ-š tekteb	ma Rayḥin-š tekketbu	ma Rak-š tekteb	ma Rakum-š tekketbu
2nd (f)	ma ktebti-š	ma ktebtu-š	ma tekketbi-š	ma tekketbu-š	ma Rayḥa-š tekketbi	ma Rayḥin-š tekketbu	ma Raki-š tekketbi	ma Rakum-š tekketbu
3rd (m)	ma kteb-š	ma ketbu-š	ma yekteb-š	ma yekketbu-š	ma Rayeḥ-š yekteb	ma Rayḥin-š yekketbu	ma Rah-š yekteb	ma Rahum-š yekketbu
3rd (f)	ma ketbet-š	ma ketbu-š	ma tekteb-š	ma yekketbu-š	ma Rayḥa-š tekteb	ma Rayḥin-š yekketbu	ma Raha-š tekteb	ma Rahum-š yekketbu

Other negative words (walu, etc.) are used in combination with ma to express more complex types of negation. ʃ is not used when other negative words are used

- ma qult walu ("I didn't say anything")
- ma šuft tta waḥed ("I didn't see anyone")

or when two verbs are consecutively in the negative

- ma šuft ma smeεt ("I neither saw nor did I hear").

=== Verb derivation ===
Verb derivation is done by adding affixes or by doubling consonants, there are two types of derivation forms: causative, passive.

- Causative: is obtained by doubling consonants :

xrej "to go out" → xerrej "to make to go out"
dxel "to enter" → dexxel "to make to enter, to introduce".

- Passive:It is obtained by prefixing the verb with t- / tt- / tn- / n- :

qtel "to kill" → tneqtel "to be killed"
šreb "to drink" → tnešreb "to be drunk".

=== The adverbs of location ===
Things could be in three places hnaya (right here), hna (here) or el-hih (there).

=== Pronouns ===
==== Personal pronouns ====
Most Algerian Arabic dialects have eight personal pronouns since they no longer have gender differentiation of the second and third person in the plural forms. However, pre-Hilalian dialects retain seven personal pronouns since gender differentiation of the second person in the singular form is absent as well.

Person	Singular	Plural
1st	ana	ḥna
2nd (m)	n'ta	n'tuma
2nd (f)	n'ti	n'tuma
3rd (m)	huwwa	huma
3rd (f)	hiyya	huma

Example: « ḥatta ana/ana tani. » — "Me too."

Person	Algerian Arabic
I am	rani
You are (m)	rak
You are (f)	raki
He is	rah or Rahu
She is	Rahi or Raha
We are	rana
You or Y'all are	raku or rakum (m)and (f)
They are	rahum (m)and (f)

Example: « Rani hna. » — "I'm here." and « Waš rak. » "How are you." to both males and females.

==== Possessive pronouns ====
Dar means house.

Person	Singular	Plural
1st	i (Dari)	na (Darna)
2nd	(e)k (Dar(e)k)	kum (Darkum)
3rd (m)	u (Daru)	(h)um (Dar(h)um)
3rd (f)	ha (Darha)	(hum) (Dar(h)um)

Example : « dar-na. » — "Our house" (House-our) Possessives are frequently combined with taε "of, property" : dar taε-na — "Our house.", dar taε-kum ...etc.

Singular:

taε-i = my or mine

taε-ek = your or yours (m, f)

taε-u = his

taε-ha = hers

Plural:

taε-na = our or ours

taε-kum = your or yours (m, f)

taε-hum = their or theirs (m, f)

"Our house" can be Darna or Dar taε-na, which is more like saying 'house of ours'. Taε can be used in other ways just like in English in Spanish. You can say Dar taε khuya, which means 'house of my brother' or directly Dar khuya 'my brother's house'.

==== Interrogative pronouns ====
Interrogatives	Algerian Arabic
What ?	waš ?
When ?	waqtaš ? / wektaš ? / wektah ? / wekket ?
Why?	3lah ? / 3laš ? / llah ?
Which ?	waš-men ? / aš-men ? / ama ?
Where ?	win ?
Who ?	škun ? / menhu ?
How ?	kifaš ? / kifah ? / ki ?
How many ?	šḥal ? / qeddaš ? / gueddaš ? / gueddah ?
Whose ?	taε-men ?

==== Verbal pronouns ====
Person	Singular	Plural
1st	ni	na
2nd (m)	(e)k	kum
3rd (m)	u (after a consonant) / h (after a vowel) / hu (before an indirect object pronoun)	hum
3rd (f)	ha	hum

Examples:

« šuft-ni. » — "You saw me." (You.saw-me)
« qetl-u. » — "He killed him." (He.killed-him)
« kla-h. » — "He ate it." (He.ate-it)

=== Demonstratives ===
Unlike Classical Arabic, Algerian Arabic has no dual and uses the plural instead. The demonstrative (Hadi) is also used for "it is".

Interrogatives	Algerian Arabic	Emphasized
This	had (m), hadi (f)	hada, hadaya (m), hadiyya (f)
That	dak (m), dik (f)	hadak (m), hadik (f)
These	hadu	haduma
Those	duk	haduk

== Sample text ==
Auguste Moulieras's Les fourberies de si Djeh'a. The text below was translated from the Kabyle language.

Buzelluf	Sheep Head
Waħed en-nhar, jħa med-lu baba-h frank, baş yeşri buzelluf. Şra-h, w kla gagħ leħm-u. Bqa ğir legħdem, jab-u l baba-h. Ki şaf-u qal-lu: "waş hada?" Qal-lu: "buzelluf". -A şmata, win rahi wedn-u? -Kan tgħreş. -Win rahum għini-h? -Kan għma. -Win rah lsan-u? -Kan bekkuş.: U el-jelda tagħ ras-u, win rahi?; -Kan fertgħas.	One day, Jha's father gave him one cent so he buys a sheep head. He bought it and ate all of its meat. Only an empty carcass was left. He brought it to his father. Then, when he saw it, he said: "what is that?" Jehha said: "a sheep head". -You vile, where are its ears? -It was deaf. -Where are its eyes? -It was blind. -Where is its tongue? -It was mute. -And the skin of its head, where is it? -It was bald.

== French loanwords ==
Algerian Arabic contains numerous French loanwords.

Algerian Arabic	French loanword	English meaning	Algerian Arabic	French loanword	English meaning
feršiṭa	fourchette	fork	por	port	port
friza	fraises	strawberries	otel	hôtel	hotel
nurmalmu	normalement	normally	frijider	frigidaire	refrigerator
karṭa	carte	card	bumba	bombe	bomb
buja (v)	bouger (v)	move (v)	atay	thé	tea
farina	farine	flour	duntist	dentiste	dentist
tilifun	téléphone	phone	šufur	chauffeur	driver (chauffeur)
valiza	valise	suitcase	paṣpur	passport	passport
trunspur	transport	transportation	tunubil	automobile	car
kazirna	caserne	barracks	couzina	cuisine	kitchen
fermli	infirmier	(male) nurse	blaṣa/plaṣa	place	place/seat
pyasa/byasa	pièce	piece	šarji (v)	charger (v)	load/charge (v)
karti	quartier	district	jerda	jardin	garden
girra	guerre	war	riska (v)	risquer (v)	risk (v)
(g)kravaṭa	cravate	tie	zigu	égout	sewer
mikru	micro-ordinateur	computer	kadre	cadre	frame
riẓu	réseau	network	ridu	rideau	curtain
ṭabla	table	table	biyyi	billet	ticket
vista	veste	jacket	bulisiyya	police	police
kaskiṭa	casquette	cap	balona	ballon	ball
makiyaj	maquillage	makeup	āntik	antique	Good

(v)=verb

== See also ==
- Varieties of Arabic
- Maghrebi Arabic
- Moroccan Arabic
- Tunisian Arabic
- Hassaniya Arabic
- Libyan Arabic
- Languages of Algeria
- Belkassem Ben Sedira
