= Ministry of National Education (Algeria) =

Government ministry of Algeria

- Ministère de l'Éducation nationale وزارة التربية الوطنية

Agency overview
- Type: Ministry
- Jurisdiction: Government of Algeria
- Headquarters: El Mouradia, Algiers Province
- Employees: 720.000
- Annual budget: €11 billion
- Minister responsible: Mohamed Seghir Saâdaoui, Minister of National Education
- Website: www.education.gov.dz

The Ministry of National Education (Arabic: وزارة التربية الوطنية, French: Ministère de l'Éducation nationale) is the Algerian ministry in charge of education in Algeria. Its head office is in El Mouradia, Algiers Province, near Algiers.

== See also ==
- Education in Algeria
