= Civil Forum for Change =

- Established: 9 March 2019 (6 years ago)
- Types: voluntary association
- Aim: regime change
- Country: Algeria

The Civil Forum for Change (French: Forum civil pour le changement, FCC or FCPC) is an alliance of 70 citizens' groups created on 9 March 2019 during the "Hirak" 2019 Algerian protests. As of October 2019, the FCC is headed by Abderrahmane Arar. The FCC supported the holding of the 12 December 2019 presidential election.

== Creation ==
The FCC was created on 9 March 2019 during the "Hirak" 2019 Algerian protests, coordinated by Abderrahmane Arar. It claimed to consist of 70 national and local citizens' associations.

== June/July meetings and the Instance de dialogue ==
The FCC participated in a meeting on 15 June 2019 at which the Dynamiques de la société civile, an alliance of trade unions, civil society groups and individuals who aim to coordinate their Hirak actions of reorganising the political structure of the Algerian state, from which the Wasilla network had withdrawn on the grounds of the lack of a clear support for equality between women and men. In July, Jeune Afrique saw "three forces" emerging from the numerous debates among civil society actors: the FCC, the Dynamiques, and the Initiative politique globale/Forces du changement coordinated by Abdelaziz Rahabi.

On 6 July, a national conference was held by the FCC and the Forces du changement. The main outcome of the meeting was a plan to create a panel of well-respected people for discussions with the government and for the holding of a presidential election.

On 17 July, the FCC proposed a 13-member dialogue panel, including Karim Younes, Mouloud Hamrouche, Mokdad Sifi, Ahmed Taleb Ibrahimi, Djamila Bouhired, Fatiha Benabou, Nacer Djabi, Mustapha Bouchachi, Islam Benattia, Lyes Merabet, Nafissa Lahrèche, Smaaïl Lalmas and Aïcha Zenaï. Abderrahmane Arar stated in a press conference that all thirteen had agreed to participate in the panel. Djamila Bouhired, a well-known freedom fighter in the Algerian War for liberation from French occupation, replied that she was unaware of having been proposed for the panel and that she "could not be a member of a group of people that included some who had been in the [ruling clique]". The dialogue panel, which later became known as the Instance nationale de dialogue et de médiation, was widely criticised by the Hirak protestors. The FCC responded to criticisms by saying that the panel "doesn't represent either Hirak or the people is not speak in their name".

== Towards the 12 December presidential election ==
In September 2019, Arar, on behalf of the FCC, denounced the arrests of Hirak activists and called for the government to "prepare a calm climate to help the electoral operation succeed". In early October, the FCC organised its "national constitutional assembly" with 400 participants, electing Arar as its president. Arar declared his intention to be a candidate in the presidential election.

== See also ==
- Forces of the Democratic Alternative
- Dynamiques de la société civile
