= Hirak (Algeria) =

Protests against the government

2019–2021 Algerian protests
- Part of 2018–2024 Arab protests
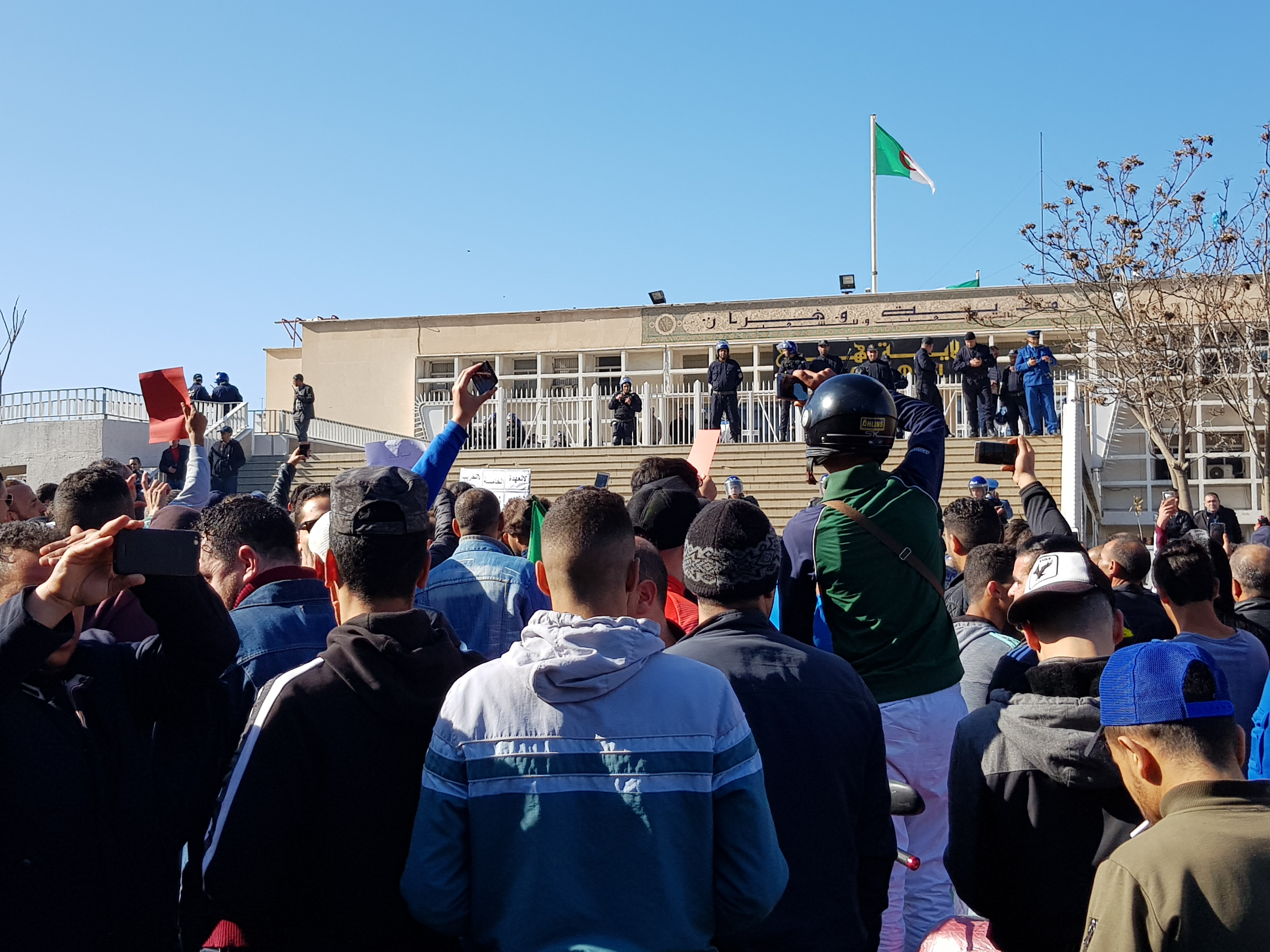
- Protesters on 22 February 2019 in Oran
- Date: 16 February 2019 – 20 March 2020; (1 year, 1 month and 4 days); 5 October 2020 – 9 October 2020; (4 days); 18 February 2021 – 30 April 2021; (2 months, 1 week and 5 days)
- Location: Algeria Diaspora communities: France; Belgium; Switzerland; Germany; United Kingdom; Canada; United States
- Caused by: Bouteflika's 5th term; Political corruption; Electoral fraud; Restriction on the freedom of the press; Unemployment
- Goals: Resignation of Presidents Abdelaziz Bouteflika then Abdelkader Bensalah then Abdelmadjid Tebboune and their cabinets; End Army influence on politics; Constituent assembly; Democratic transition
- Methods: Demonstrations; Protest marches; Sit-ins; Online activism; Civil disobedience; General strikes
- Result: Resignation of Prime Minister Ahmed Ouyahia; Resignation of President Abdelaziz Bouteflika; Resignation of Prime Minister Noureddine Bedoui; Presidential election postponed to 12 December 2019; Army chief Ahmed Gaid Salah calls on the constitutional council to remove Bouteflika from office; 12 December 2019 presidential election boycotted by 92% (RCD) or 60% (gov't figures) of electors; Failure to remove 'le pouvoir'; President Abdelmadjid Tebboune proposes new constitutional amendments to strengthen the judiciary and Parliament's roles

Parties
Anti-government protesters: Liberals; Protectionists; Berberists; Feminists; Arabists (until 2 Apr 2019); Socialists; Communists; Organizations: Civil Forum for Change; Femmes algériennes pour un changement vers l'égalité; Dynamiques de la société civile; National Committee for the Liberation of Detainees; Rachad; Political parties: Forces of the Democratic Alternative; Socialist Forces Front; Rally for Culture and Democracy; Workers' Party; Socialist Workers Party; Union for Change and Progress; Democratic and Social Movement; Party for Secularism and Democracy; Movement of Society for Peace; Union for Renaissance and Justice and Construction; Islamic Renaissance Movement; Justice and Development Front; Supported by: European Parliament	Government of Algeria; The Presidency; Prime ministership; Ministry of Interior and Local governments; Directorate General for National Security; Ministry of National Defence; General Staff Command; Directorate of Security Services; Political parties: National Liberation Front; Democratic National Rally; Algerian Popular Movement; Rally for Hope for Algeria; Union for Renaissance and Justice and Construction; National Construction Movement; Others: Arabists (since 2 Apr 2019); Supported by: Parliamentary Assembly of the Mediterranean; Pan-African Parliament; China

Lead figures
Non-centralized leadership	Government leaders: (Algeria) Abdelaziz Bouteflika (Former President) (Algeria) Abdelkader Bensalah (Former acting President) (Algeria) Abdelmadjid Tebboune (President) (Algeria) Ahmed Gaid Salah # (Former Chief of Staff) (Algeria) Saïd Chengriha (Chief of Staff) (Algeria) Ahmed Ouyahia (Former Prime Minister) (Algeria) Abdelmalek Sellal (Former Prime Minister and Bouteflika's campaign manager) (Algeria) Noureddine Bedoui (Former Prime Minister) (Algeria) Sabri Boukadoum (Former acting Prime Minister) (Algeria) Abdelaziz Djerrad (Prime Minister) (Algeria) Mouad Bouchareb (Former Assembly Speaker) (Algeria) Slimane Chenine (Assembly Speaker) (Algeria) Tayeb Belaiz (Former Head of Constitutional Council) (Algeria) Belkacem Zeghmati (Minister of Justice, Keeper of the Seals) (Algeria) Salah Eddine Dahmoune (Former Minister of Interior and Local Government) (Algeria) Kamel Beldjoud (Minister of Interior and Local Government)

Casualties
- Injuries: 183 (112 police officers)
- Arrested: +1,200

The 2019–2021 Algerian protests, also called Revolution of Smiles or Hirak (Arabic: الحِرَاك, romanized: al-Ḥirāk, lit. 'The movement'), began on 16 February 2019, six days after Abdelaziz Bouteflika announced his candidacy for a fifth presidential term in a signed statement. These protests, without precedent since the Algerian Civil War, were peaceful and led the military to insist on Bouteflika's immediate resignation, which took place on 2 April 2019. By early May, a significant number of power-brokers close to the deposed administration, including the former president's younger brother Saïd, had been arrested.

The rising tensions within the Algerian regime can be traced back to the beginning of Bouteflika's rule, which has been characterized by the state's monopoly on natural resources revenues used to finance the government's clientelist system and ensure its stability. Major demonstrations took place in the largest urban centers of Algeria from February to December 2019. Due to their significant scale, the protests attracted international media coverage and provoked reactions from several heads of states and scholarly figures.

== Background ==
=== Abdelaziz Bouteflika ===
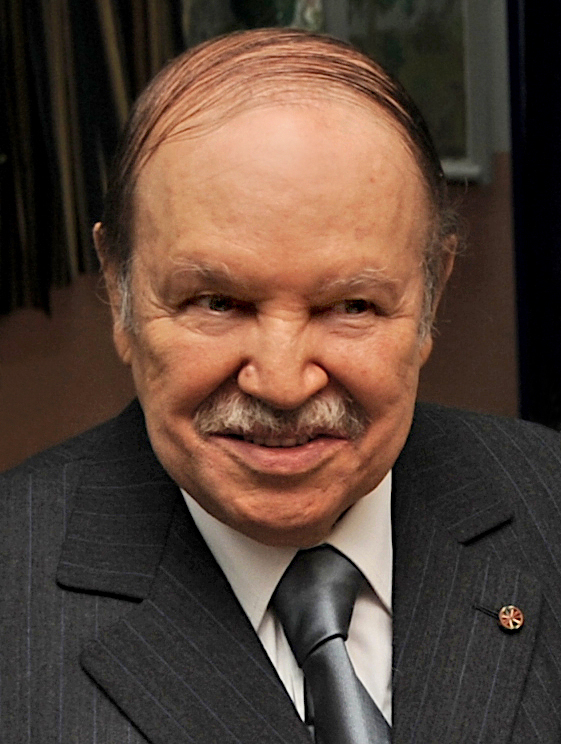
Abdelaziz Bouteflika, the former President of Algeria from 1999 to 2019.

Abdelaziz Bouteflika had been president of the People's Democratic Republic of Algeria since 1999. Two amnesties (via referendum) for former combatants in the Algerian Civil War had taken place during his presidency (1999 and 2005). A complex "dirty war" between Islamic guerrillas and the government had claimed a contested number of approximately 200,000 lives between 1991–2002. Nearly half of the Algerian population was born after the end of the conflict, amidst the din of repeated corruption scandals.

With Bouteflika's accession to power in 1999, he began a diplomatic mission to rehabilitate Algeria's image abroad. He set about consolidating power, especially after his re-election in 2003. During his tenure as president, the power center in Algerian politics shifted from the east to west, most particularly to Tlemcen, where some became highly placed figures in the media, administration, and police. Roughly $10 billion of public funding flowed to the city for construction projects, including a university, hotels, museums and airports. €155m was spent on a state residence, which remains incomplete. Many of the public works contracts were given to Chinese companies, by whom local contractors were allegedly not always paid.

Oil-rich during the Arab Spring, the government was able to quiet dissent during the 2010–2012 protests with increased spending.

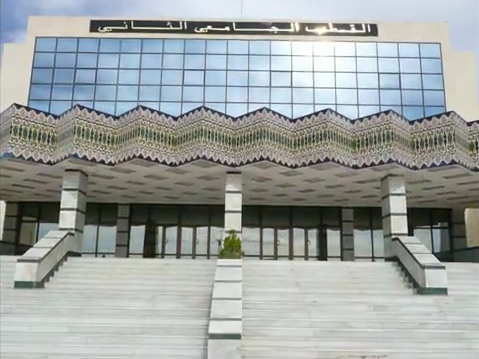
University of Abou Bekr Belkaïd in Tlemcen.

The constitutional revision of 2016 limited the number of presidential terms that could be served to two, but nevertheless allowed Bouteflika to seek a fifth term, because the law was not retroactive.

Since 2005, and especially after his stroke in 2013, Bouteflika's ability to govern the country was called into question: rumors of his death were frequent as he was often hospitalized, no longer spoke and made very few written statements. In this context, some Algerians considered his announced candidacy for the presidential election, originally scheduled for 18 April 2019, 4 July 2019 or 2020, to be humiliating.

=== Corruption ===
Members of Bouteflika's administration were accused of engaging in corrupt practices in several instances. In 2010, Sonatrach, the state-owned oil and gas company, suspended all of its senior management after two of the company's vice-presidents were imprisoned for corruption. Algeria's Energy Minister Chakib Khelil announced that the president of the company and several executives had been placed under judicial supervision. In 2013, Khelil was also accused of receiving a bribe from a subsidiary of the Italian energy company Eni. According to El Watan, overbilling for public works and misleading descriptions of imported goods were two common corrupt practices, facilitated by cronyism at the highest levels.

On 26 June 2018, Bouteflika dismissed Abdelghani Hamel as head of the national police (DGSN), despite the latter being part of his inner circle. This news came after one of Hamel's drivers had become a suspect in Cocainegate, which led to a general of the gendarmerie, four judges and two public prosecutors being tried for bribery.

=== Monumentalism ===
Djamaa el Djazaïr, a large mosque under construction in Algiers, is nicknamed the Great Mosque of Bouteflika. Though its construction was touted as an Algerian job-creator, immigrant workers did most of the work for China State Construction Engineering while living in prefab shantytowns around the construction site. The project still came in 2.5 times over-budget. The cost of the mosque's construction has been estimated to be between $1.4 and $2 billion. A doctor quoted in Le Monde complained that "with $4 billion [sic], 200 hospitals could have been built." Converting the mosque into a hospital has been suggested. For the Algerian press, it became a symbol of the mismanagement of public funds and of the "capricious megalomania" of the former President.

Broadly, cumulative grievances and aspirations were at the heart of the protest movement. Decade-long economic stagnation, unemployment, labour market segmentation, and chronic corruption fueled discontent. Plummeting oil and gas prices weakened the regime's capacity to continue buying off some sections of the lower classes and youth, and to contain discontent.

== Timeline ==
=== Early days ===
In December 2018, calls for demonstrations in the neighborhood of Bab El Oued against the fifth term went unheeded, except by the police, which mobilized a significant dissuasive force.

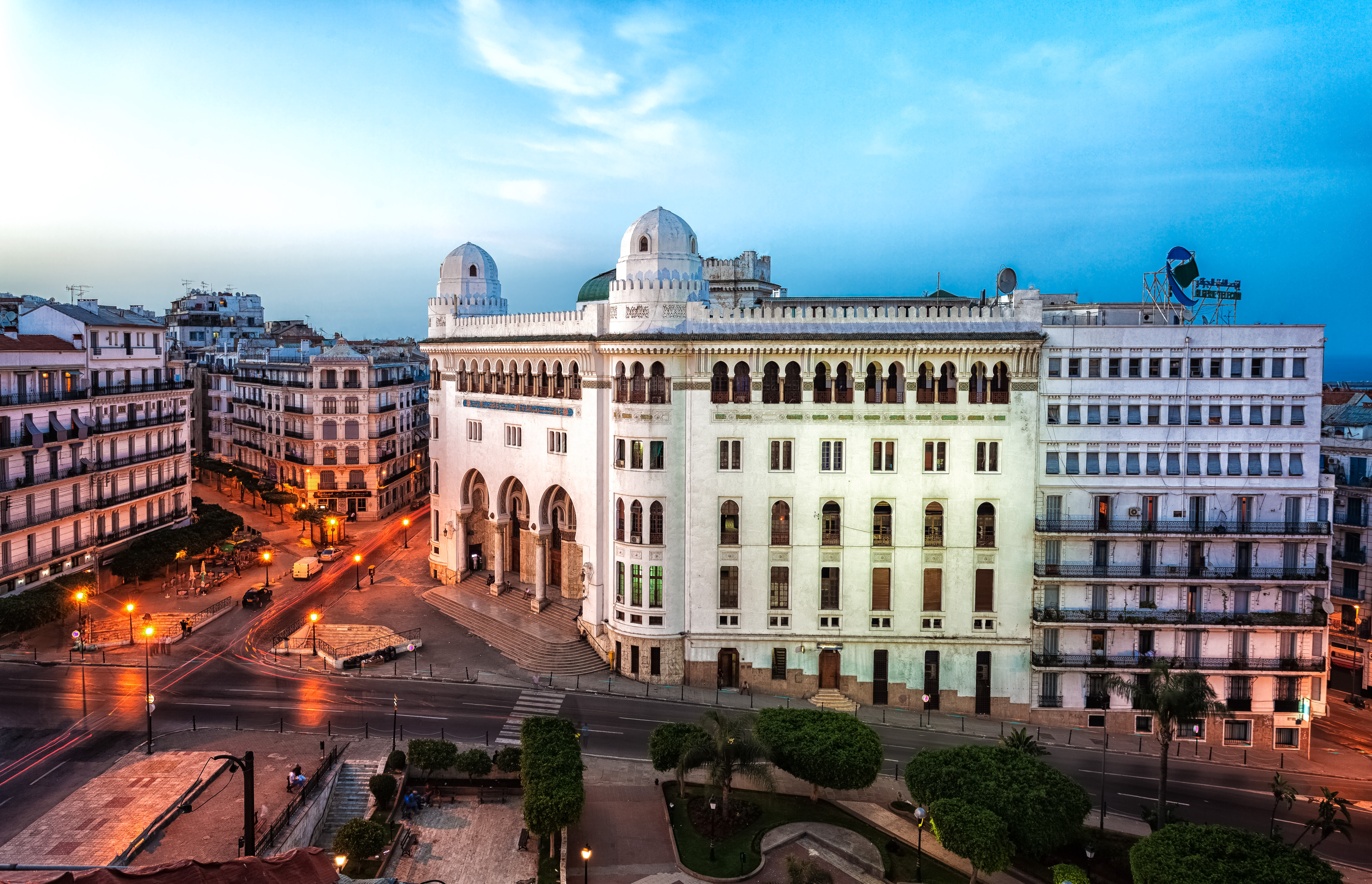
Algiers Central Post Office.

The protests were at first, following the 10 February formal announcement of Bouteflika's candidacy, limited geographically to northern Algeria. The first major demonstration took place on 16 February 2019 in Kherrata, at the eastern end of the wilaya of Bejaia in the Kabylie region, after the distribution in Kherrata and its surrounding villages of posters calling for "a peaceful march against the fifth term and against the existing system" on that date.

In Khenchela, on 19 February, a giant poster of the President of the Republic was torn down from city hall and trampled. Two days later, another suffered a similar fate in Annaba. This form of protest was related to the recent practice of offering gifts to a framed portrait of Bouteflika in the latter's absence.

=== Week 1: 22–28 February ===
Protests were organized via social media in major and mid-sized cities on 22 February. Those in Algiers—where street protests had been illegal since a demonstration on 14 June 2001—were the biggest in nearly 18 years. Smaller protests, with slogans like "There is no president, there's a poster," had been taking place in Algiers since 11 February. On 22 February, the portrait of the President was torn down from the landmark central post office. There are no official government numbers published, but one expert put the number of demonstrators at 800,000 on 22 February 2019.

Regularly hospitalized for "periodic medical examinations", Abdelaziz Bouteflika was admitted to the University Hospital of Geneva (Switzerland) on 24 February 2019.

Another large-scale demonstration took place on 24 February at the call of the Mouwatana movement ("citizenship"), On 28 February, a dozen journalists were arrested during protests against press censorship.

=== Week 2: 1–7 March ===
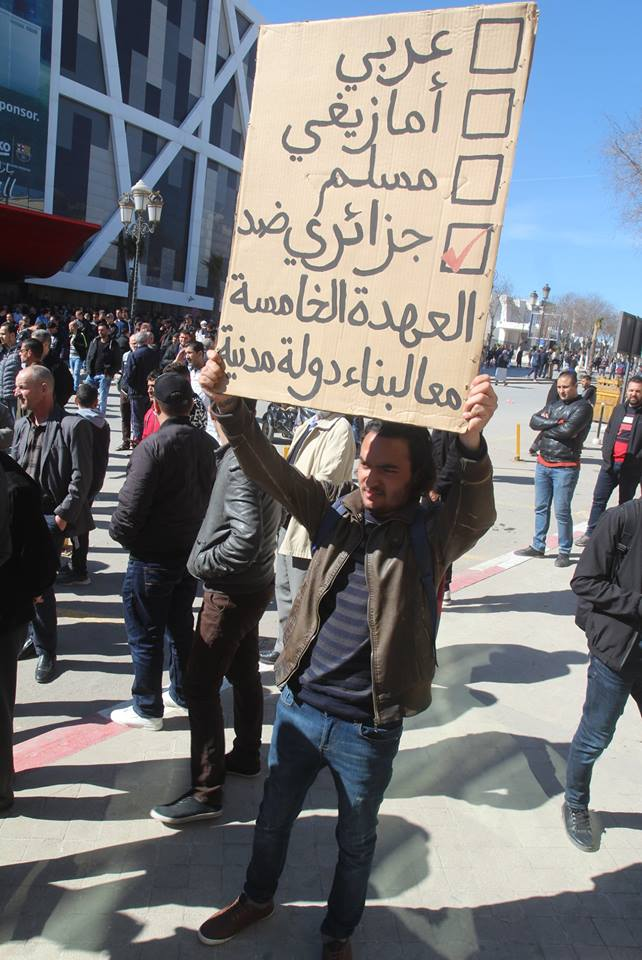
Protests in Sétif.

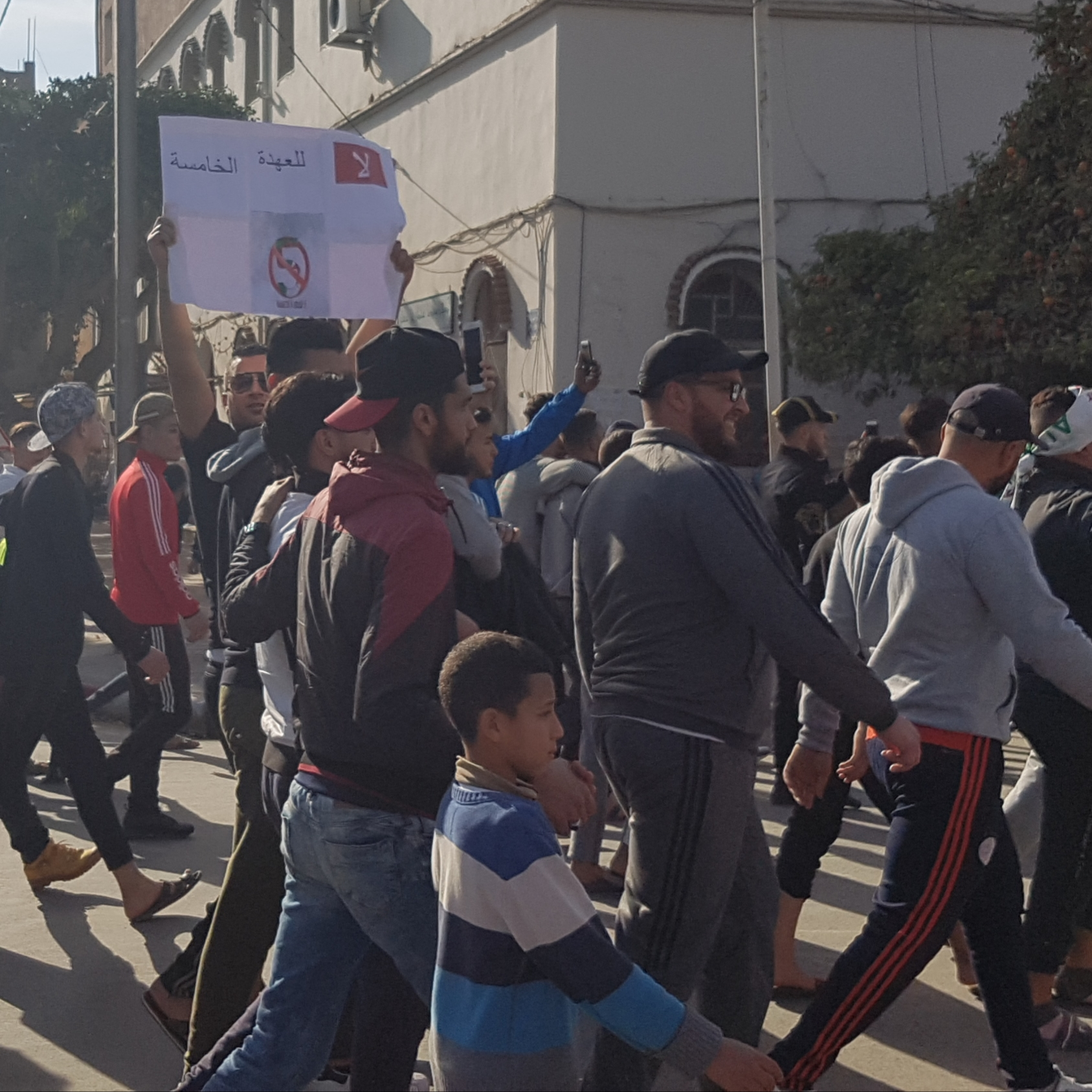
Protesters in Mohammadia.

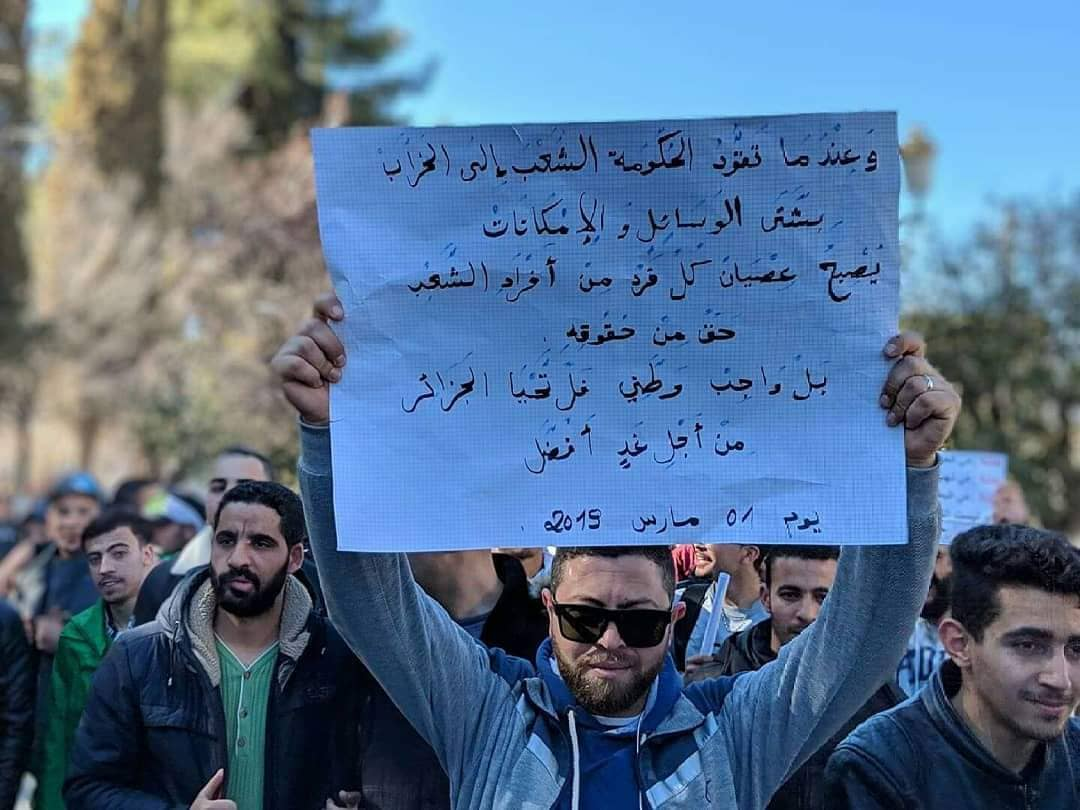
Protesters in Batna.

Three million people were estimated to have demonstrated on 1 March 2019, though no official figures were given. The private channel Dzaïr News reported that one million people demonstrated across Algeria on 1 March, which was also the first time state television broadcast images of the protests.

183 people were injured and Hassan Benkhedda, son of former interim government president, Benyoucef Benkhedda, died of a heart attack. Speaking as Interior Minister, Noureddine Bedoui confirmed that it was related to police action against "thugs unrelated to the protesters."

On 2 March 2019, Abdelaziz Bouteflika replaced his campaign director, the former prime minister Abdelmalek Sellal, who had actively campaigned for the President since 2004, by the virtually unknown Abdelghani Zaalane, a career provincial administrator. Considered to be a response to the ongoing protests, this dismissal followed the disclosure of a recording between Sellal and Ali Haddad in which the former is heard making threats.

The deadline for submitting candidatures for the presidential election was 3 March 2019. The idea of postponing the election was put forward. On 3 March, the candidacy of Bouteflika was filed by his campaign director, though the law stipulates that the candidate must be physically present for this process. Another signed message announced that if re-elected, a national conference would be convened to adopt reforms as well as a new Constitution – to be approved by referendum – and that he would not take part in the next presidential election which he promised would be held early. After the confirmation of Bouteflika's candidacy on Sunday, 3 March, and the withdrawal of several opposition candidates, including Ali Benflis and Louisa Hanoune, an anonymous call to strike was made the next day, as well as a call to protest on 8 March.

Even before the candidacy was formalized, tens of thousands of protesters were out on the streets. From Sunday night to Monday morning, hundreds of protesters marched peacefully, calling his candidacy a "provocation", an "insult" and a "masquerade". The next day, many students boycotted their classes.

The opposition, meeting at the headquarters of the Justice and Development Front, called for candidates to withdraw from the election. On the same day, following the example of the resignation the day before of Khaled Tazaghart, an elected representative (député) from the El Moustakbal party, & former minister Sid Ahmed Ferroukhi (FLN), resigned from the party. Zahir Kherraz, FLN mayor of Oued Amizour, also said he did not support a fifth term. Amar Benadouda (1931), doyen of the mayors of the country, resigned from the town hall of Guenzet.

On Tuesday, protests and student strikes continued, thousands were in the streets of Algiers, Constantine, Oran, Annaba, Bejaia, Tizi Ouzou, Bouira, Blida, Setif, or Tlemcen. On Thursday, a thousand lawyers demonstrated in Algiers.

The "Pacifist and Civilized Walkers' 18 Commandments", written by Lazhari Labter, were widely circulated on social media prior to the 8 March demonstration.

=== Week 3: 8–14 March ===
In reaction to the Friday demonstrations, the Ministry of Higher Education and Scientific Research moved the spring university holidays forward to the next day (10 March) and extended them by two weeks in an effort to calm matters down. On 10 March, the Army Chief of Staff Ahmed Gaid Salah, close to Bouteflika, gave a speech to officer cadets saying the "army and the people had a common vision of the future". This speech was front-page news in El Khabar. A 5-day general strike was begun the same day.

The day after the announcement that Bouteflika would not seek a new term, that Interior Minister Noureddine Bedoui had replaced Ahmed Ouyahia as prime minister, and that the presidential election was to be postposed sine die, university students protested for the third consecutive Tuesday across the country chanting "No tricks, Bouteflika." On Wednesday, teachers protested. On Thursday, lawyers and judges were on the streets in several cities. On 14 March, Djamila Bouhired encouraged the younger generation demonstrating, saying: "Your elders liberated Algeria from colonial domination, and you are giving back to Algerians their liberties and their pride despoiled since independence"

The protests on 15 March were estimated to have been larger than those the previous Friday. The Guardian reported that hundreds of thousands were in the streets, La Croix put the number at over a million. Protesters carried a banner criticizing France's comments that the cancellation of elections should lead to a "transition of reasonable length" saying, "It's the people who decide, not France!". Other signs included "Macron, deal with your yellow vests" and "Elysée, stop! It's 2019, not 1830."

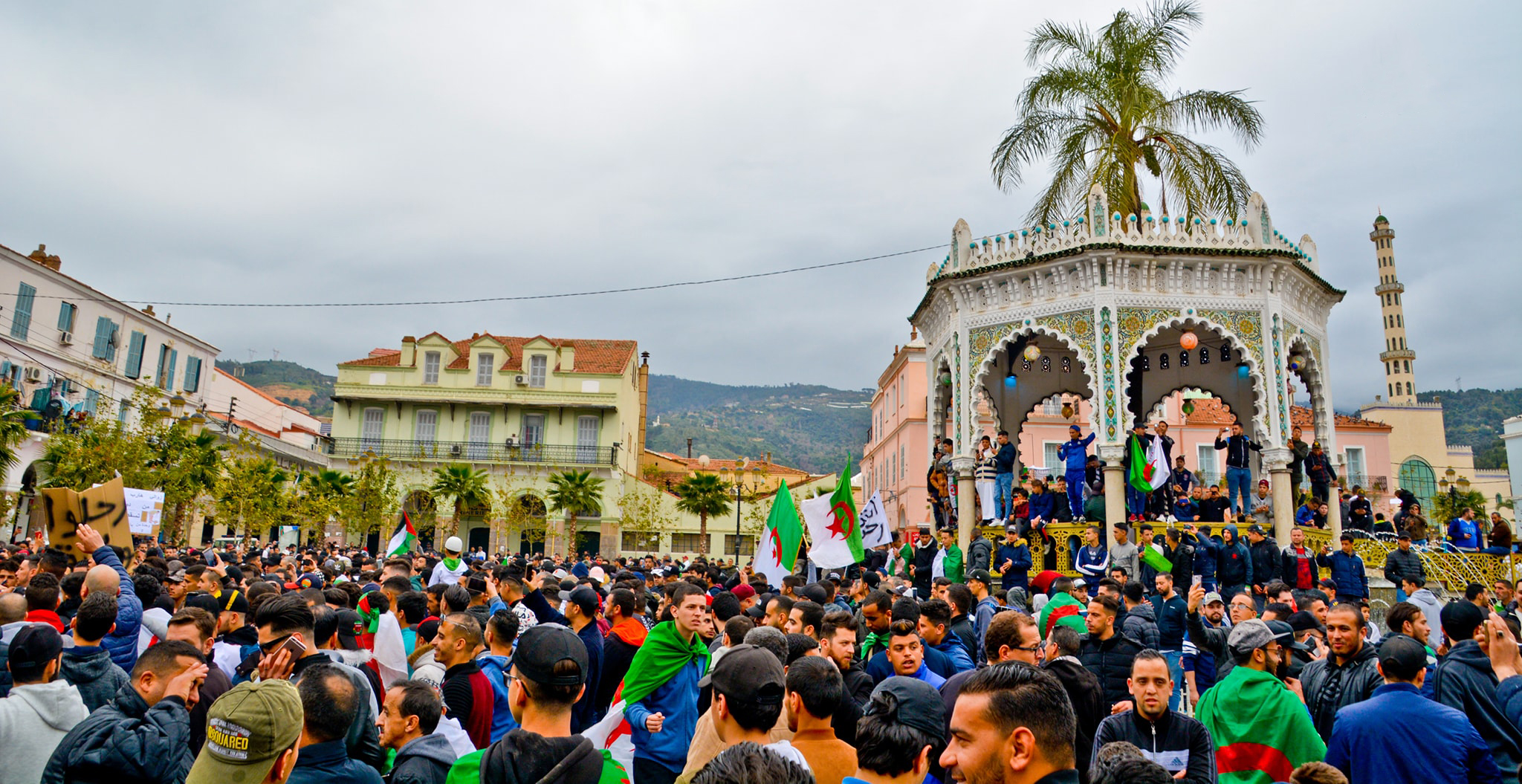
Protesters in Blida (10 March).

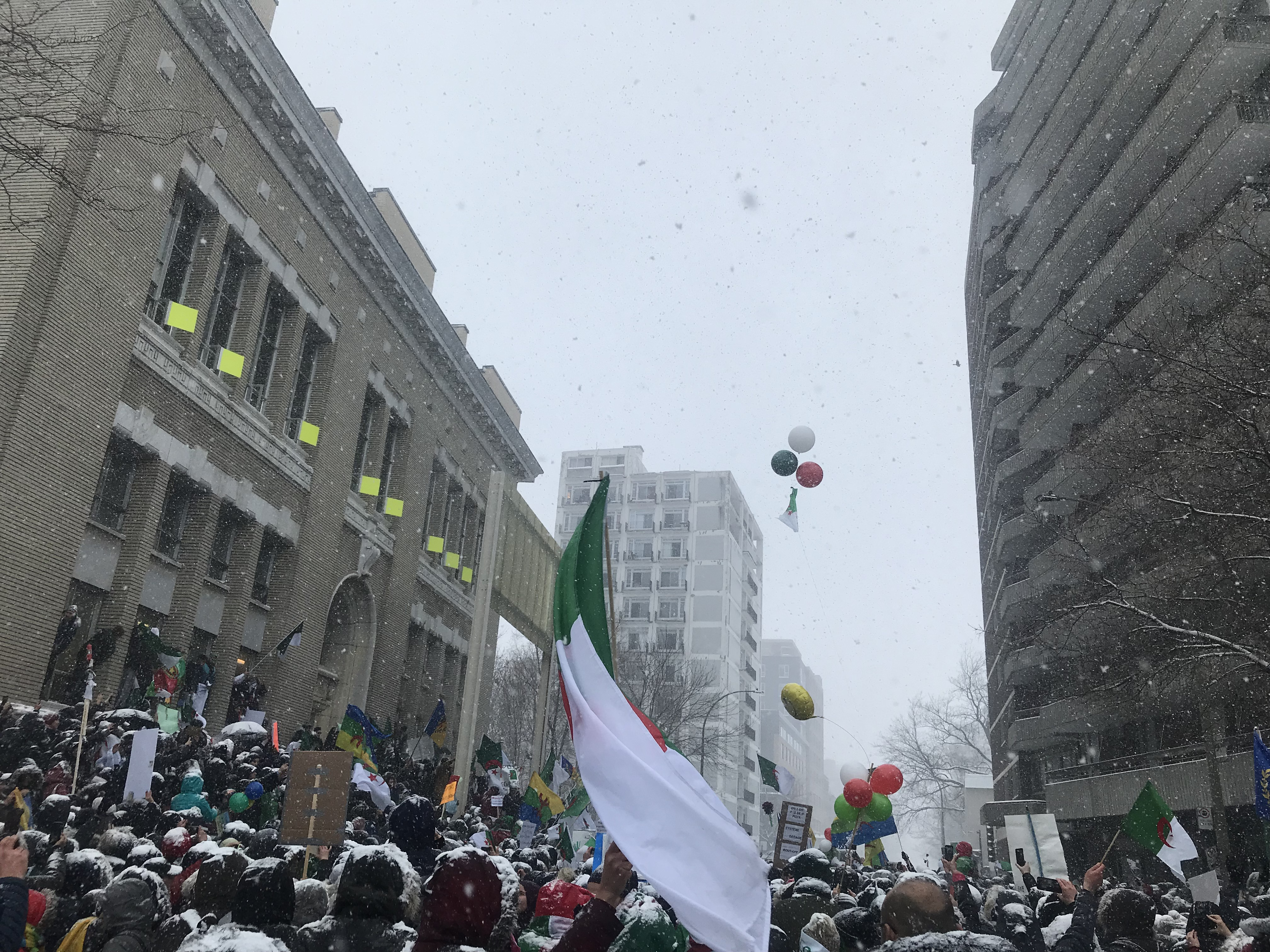
Protesters in Montreal, Canada (10 March).

=== Week 4: 15–21 March ===
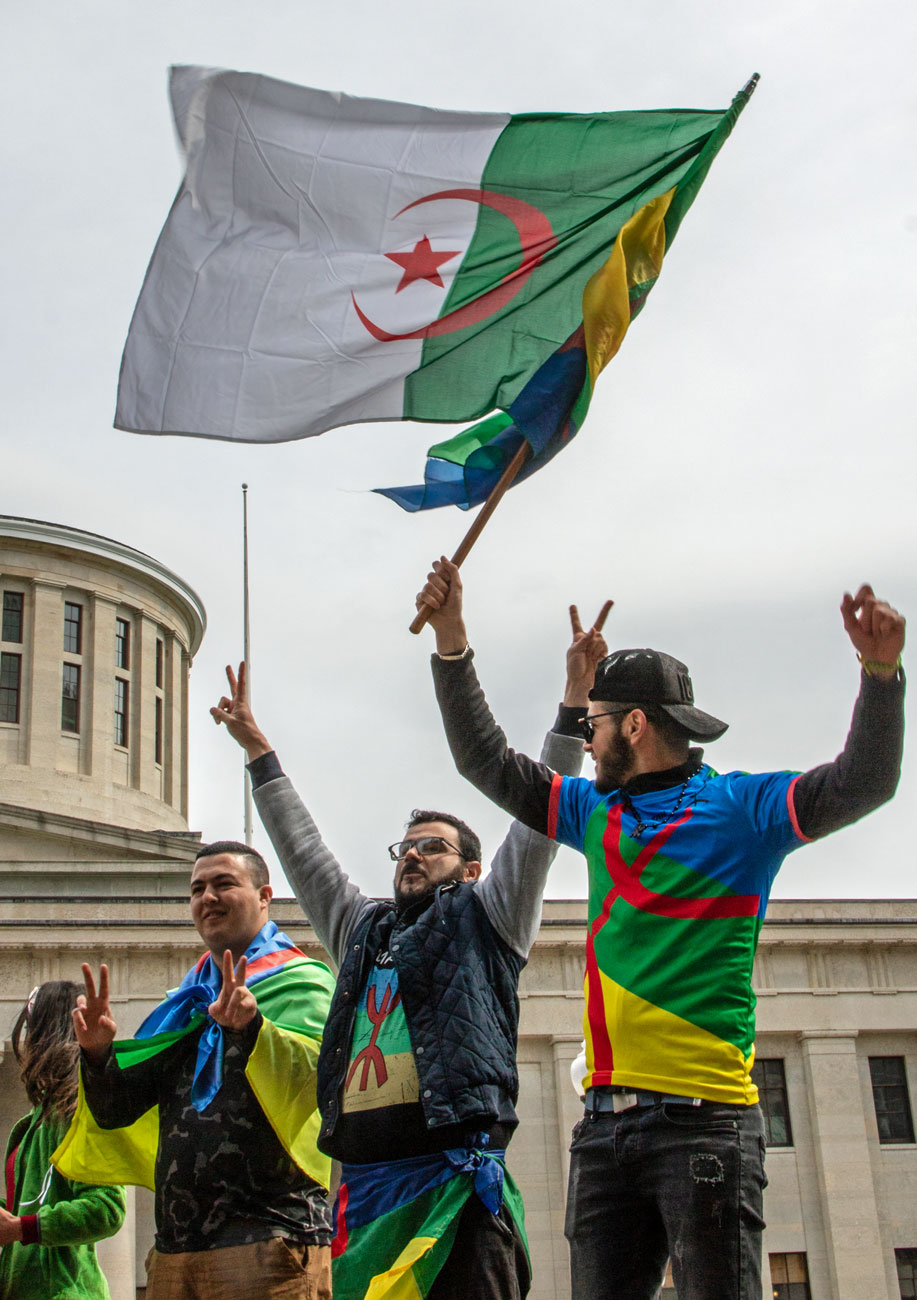
17 March 2019: Demonstration at Ohio Statehouse (Columbus)

On 16 March, twenty women created the group Femmes algériennes pour un changement vers l'égalité (FACE), calling for full equality between men and women, proposing the creation of a regular feminist square in front of Algiers 1 University and calling for equal representation of men and women in citizens' initiatives resulting from the Hirak protests. On 17 March, the newly appointed Prime Minister announced the intention of forming a government of politically unaffiliated experts, which would "reflect the demographics of the Algerian society". Students were again in the streets on Tuesday, 18 March demanding that Bouteflika step down by the end of his term (28 April). The army chief of staff said that the army needed to deal with the crisis.

=== Week 5: 22–28 March ===
On 26 March, in a speech given in Ouargla and covered live on Algerian television, Ahmed Gaid Salah urged the Constitutional Council to declare Bouteflika unfit. The Council began deliberations the same day. When the sitting president is removed, the president of the Council of the Nation—at the time Abdelkader Bensalah—becomes acting president for a maximum of 90 days while elections are organized. On 27 March, Ahmed Ouyahia called on Bouteflika to resign. The same day the Workers' Party announced the resignation of their elected members of the People's National Assembly.

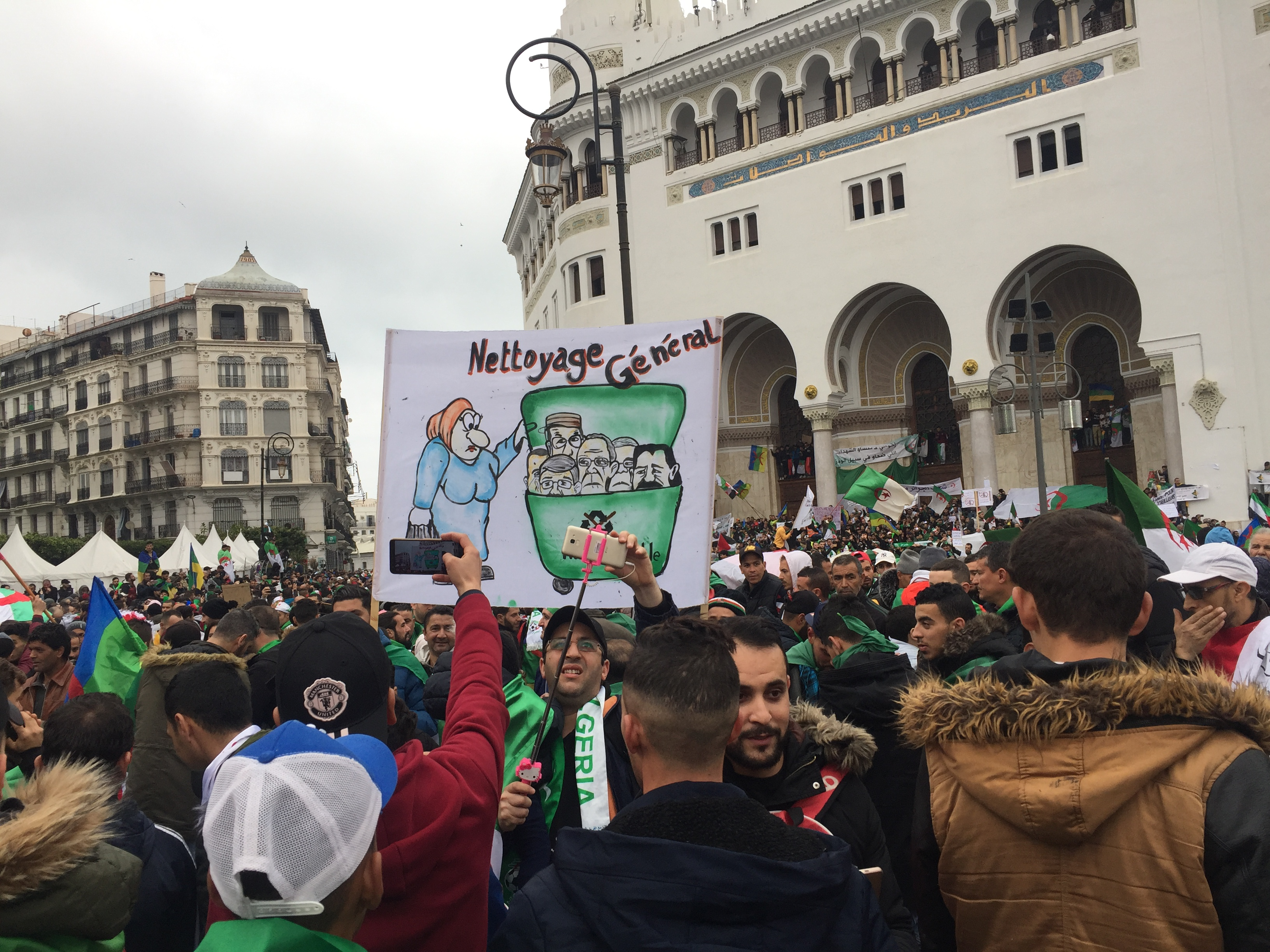
Demonstration in Algiers on 22 March 2019.

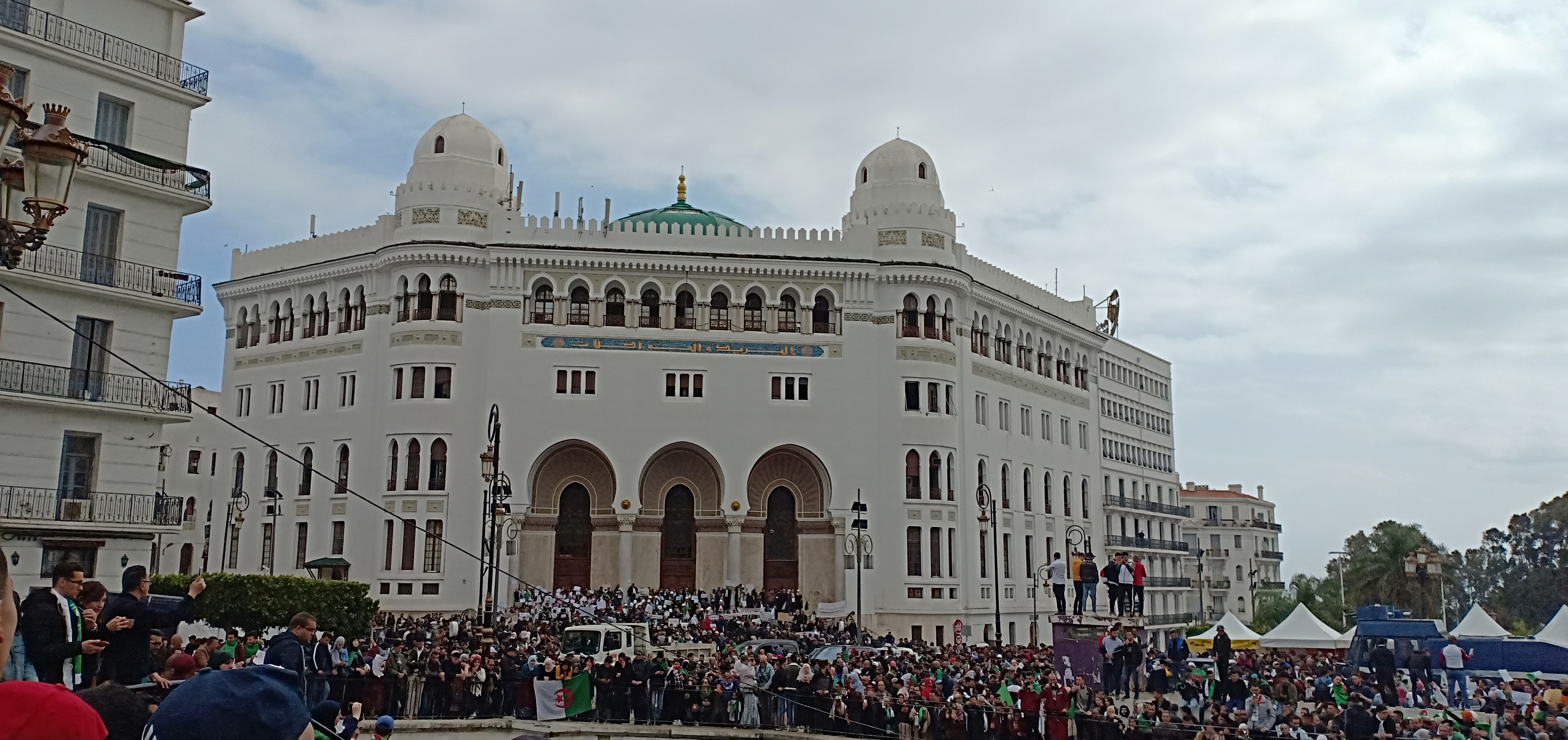
Demonstration in Algiers on 26 March 2019.

=== Week 6: 29 March–4 April ===
On Friday 29 March, the Algerian authorities denied Reuters' reports that there were a million protesters in the capital, but did not put forward numbers of their own.

Bouteflika named a new government on 31 March 2019, two days before his resignation.

Investigations were opened into a dozen oligarchs who were prevented from leaving the country. Ali Haddad's resignation from the FCE—an employers federation, which had seen a wave of recent resignations over his remarks about the protests—and his subsequent arrest at the Tunisian border were widely reported.

Bouteflika made a statement promising to step down by the end of his term, but equivocating as to the actual date. The following day, the Army Chief of Staff (who had been appointed by Bouteflika to replace General Mohammed Lamari after his 2004 election) insisted both privately and publicly that he resign immediately, which he did. As provided for under Article 102 of the Algerian Constitution, Abdelkader Bensalah became acting interim President. His term can last for a maximum of 90 days while a presidential election is held. By law, he cannot participate in this election.

James McDougall wrote that the military had "recognized that radical measures were needed to save the system." Though it had regained some power at the expense of the "clan" centered around Saïd Bouteflika—including the Armed Forces chief of staff—McDougall added that "[s]ome observers and activists believe that the army as an institution now wants to stay out of politics and might even support the "clean-up" of corruption that protesters demand."

=== Week 7: 5–11 April ===
The streets were again exuberant and crowded with hundreds of thousands on Friday 5 April, with marchers carrying signs demanding further resignations, specifically mentioning the 3B: Noureddine Bedoui (prime minister), Abdelkader Bensalah (who was officially appointed acting interim president on 9 April), and Tayeb Belaiz (head of the constitutional council); as well as the Army Chief of Staff.

Tear gas and a water cannon were used repeatedly to prevent more than a thousand students chanting "Silmiya, Silmiya" (peaceful, peaceful) from going through the Tunnel des Facultés in Algiers on the 8th successive Tuesday of student demonstrations.

=== Week 8: 12–18 April ===
The Friday protests, of the same size as previous weeks, were more conflictual, with police blocking access to the city and parts of the city. On 16 April, the president of the constitutional council, Tayed Belaiz—one of the three Bs whose ouster protesters sought—informed the council that he had submitted his resignation.

=== Week 9: 19–25 April ===
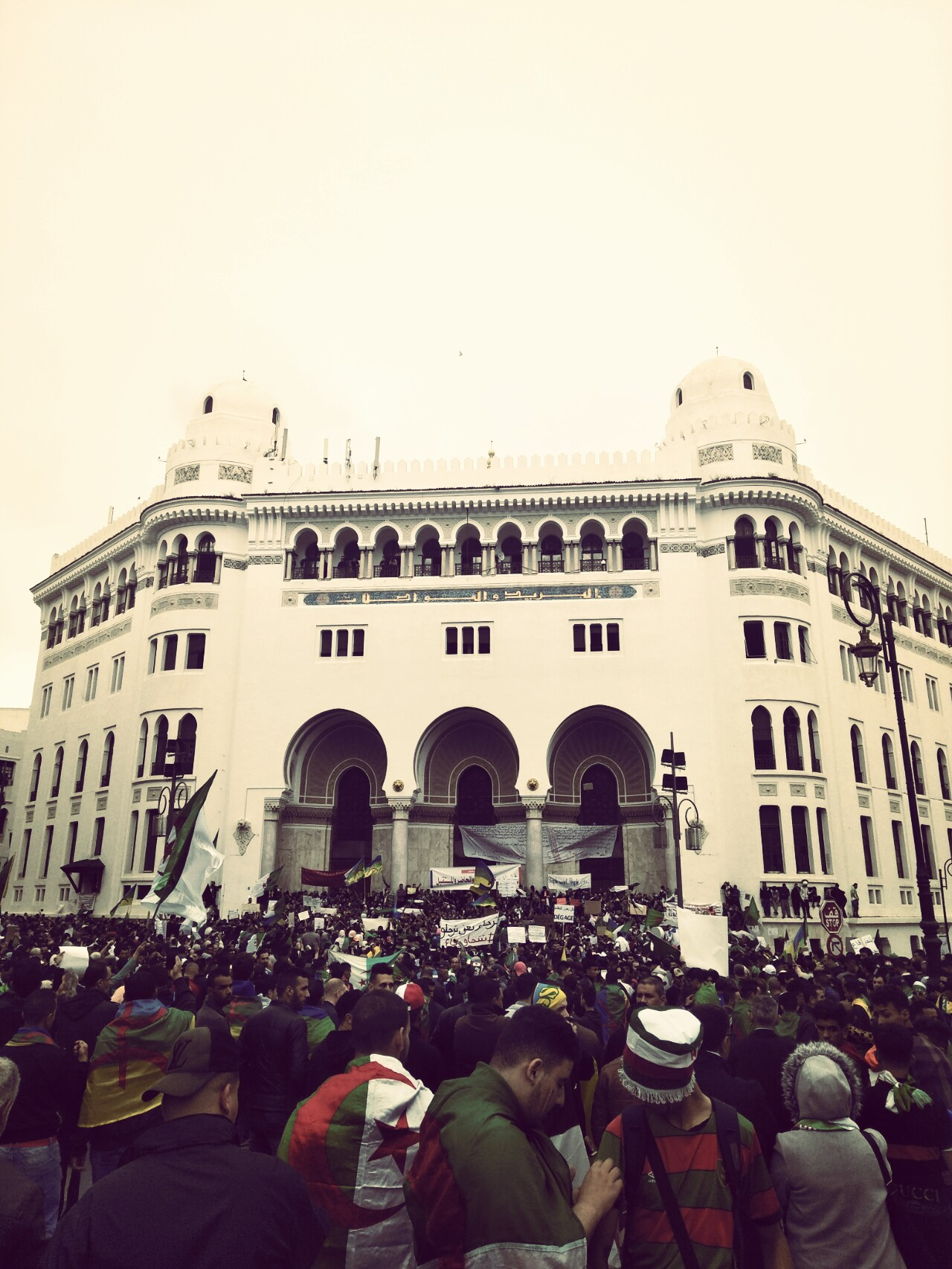
Demonstration on April 19 at the Grande-Poste in Algiers.

The size of the protests on 19 April was similar to previous weeks. Ennahar TV reported that five billionaires were arrested on 22 April 2019: four brothers from the Kouninef family, close to Saïd Bouteflika, and Issad Rebrab, the CEO of Cevital. The head of Cevital's communications department denied the reports. A judge also called in the former prime minister and the current finance minister for questioning.

=== Week 10: 26 April-2 May ===
On Friday 26, thousands of protesters gathered in Algiers for the tenth week despite attempts by the authorities to close all entrances to the capital. Banners such as "The system must go" and "We are fed up with you," were raised in city centre. Earlier, Algeria's richest businessman and three other billionaires were arrested in an on-going investigation on the grounds of corruption.

=== Week 11: 3–9 May ===
For the eleventh consecutive week, tens of thousands of people, according to al-Jazeera, demonstrated on Friday 3 May and raised banners that read: "You must go" and "Thieves you have destroyed the country". Protesters also continued to insist on the peaceful character of their demonstrations, chanting "Peaceful, peaceful," while marching in central Algiers. It was also reported that the power broker military chief Ahmed Gaid Salah called for "dialogue", but the president of Rally for Youth Action, a civil society organisation, expressed his refusal to negotiate with "symbols of the old system."

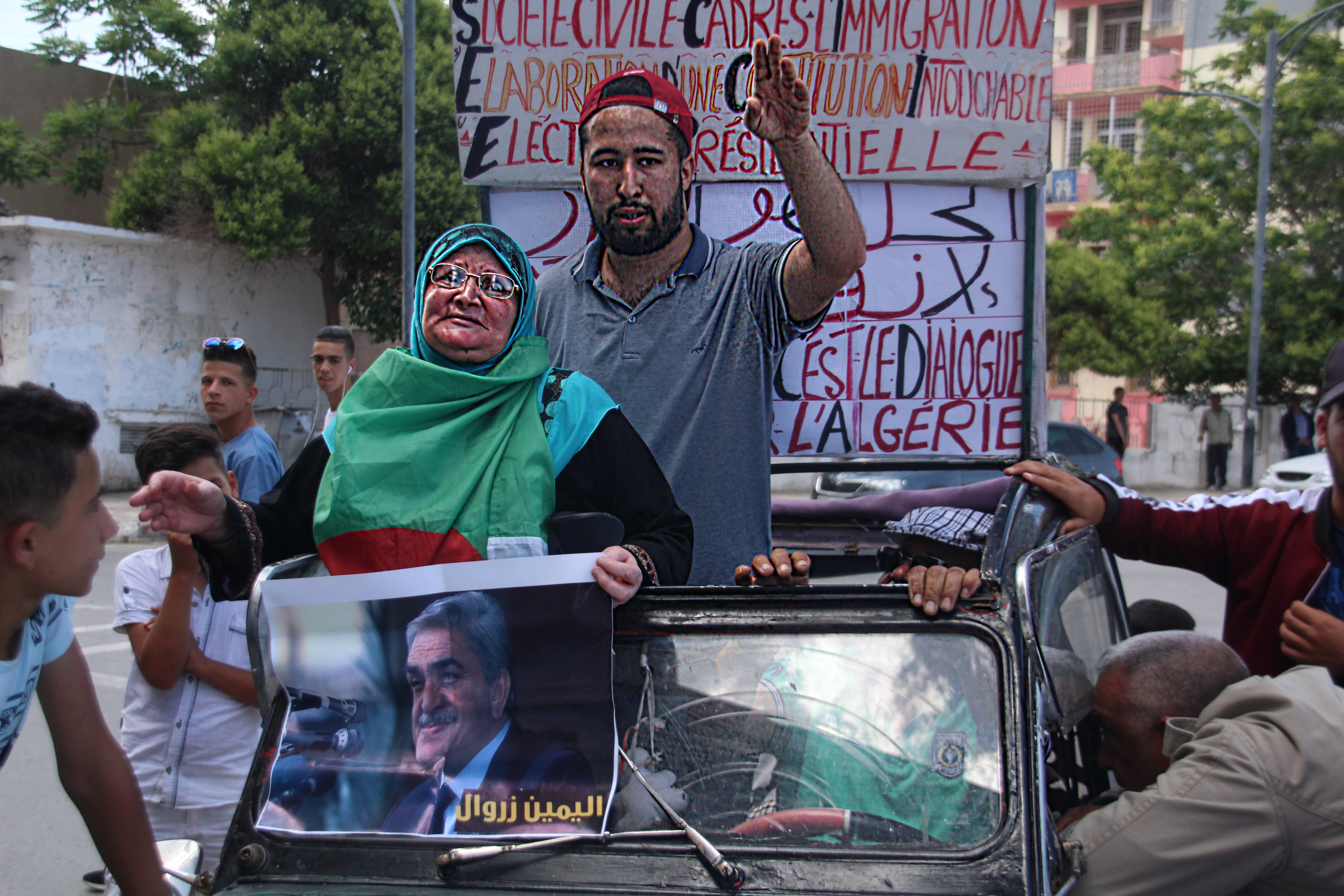
7 June 2019: Demonstrators from the Aures

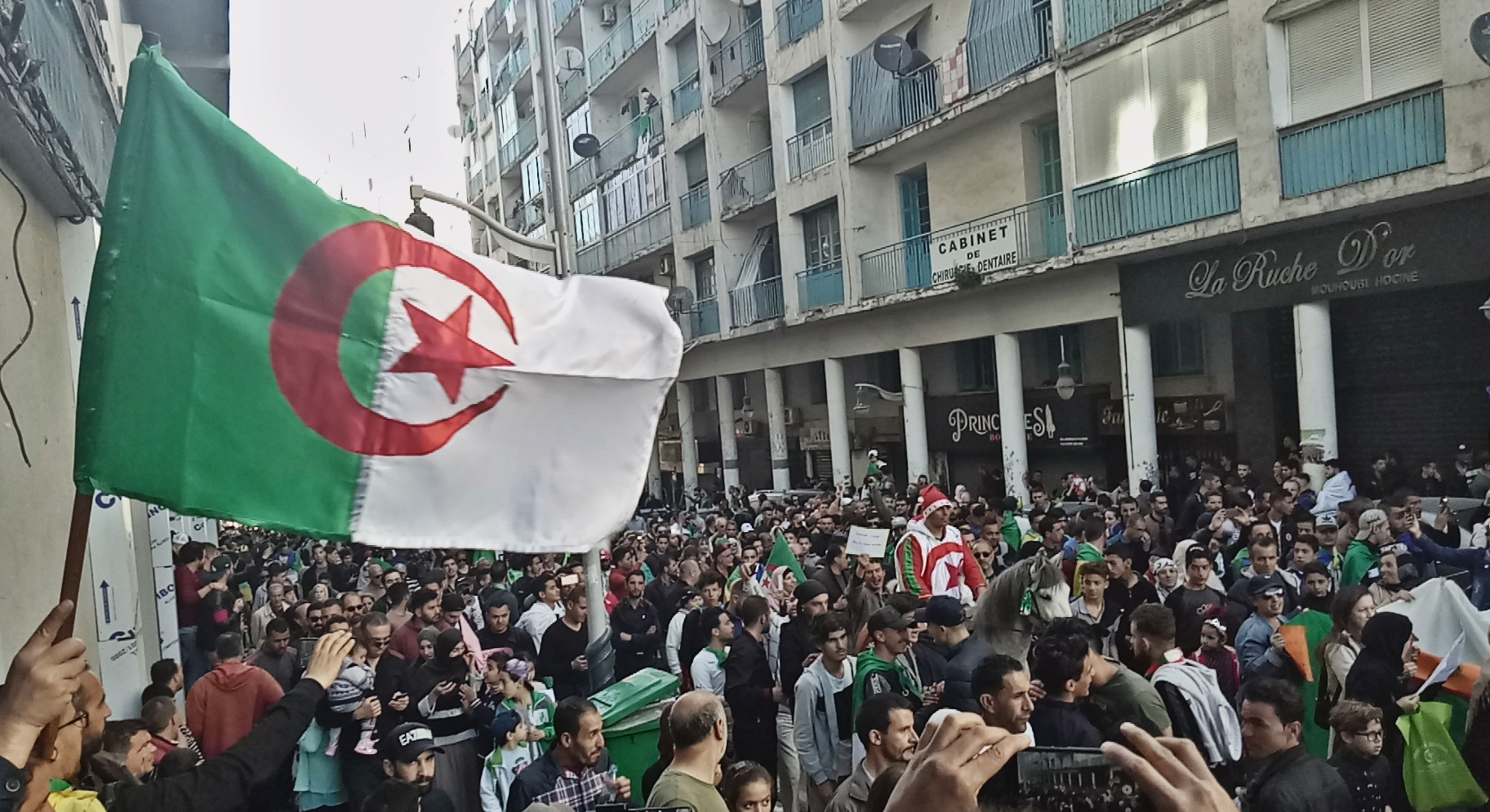
9 June 2019 in the town of Béjaïa

On Saturday 4 May, the former president's younger brother, Saïd Bouteflika, was arrested along with former secret service head General Mohamed Mediene ("Toufik") and intelligence chief Athmane Tartag ("Bachir").

Berber flag banned from demonstrations

=== June 2019 ===
On 19 June 2019, Lieutenant general Salah reiterated that no flags other than the "national emblem" would be tolerated during demonstrations. In so doing, he was targeting the Amazigh flag, a frequently-seen flyer during the Hirak (movement).

=== July 2019 ===
On 17 July, Abderrahmane Arrar, President of the Civil Forum for Change (FCPC), proposed a committee of former politicians, lawyers and human rights activists with reputations for neutrality, without political ambitions, who would mediate decision-making for organising a presidential election and a political transition. The aim was to first obtain wide consensus on the list of mediators.

=== September 2019 ===
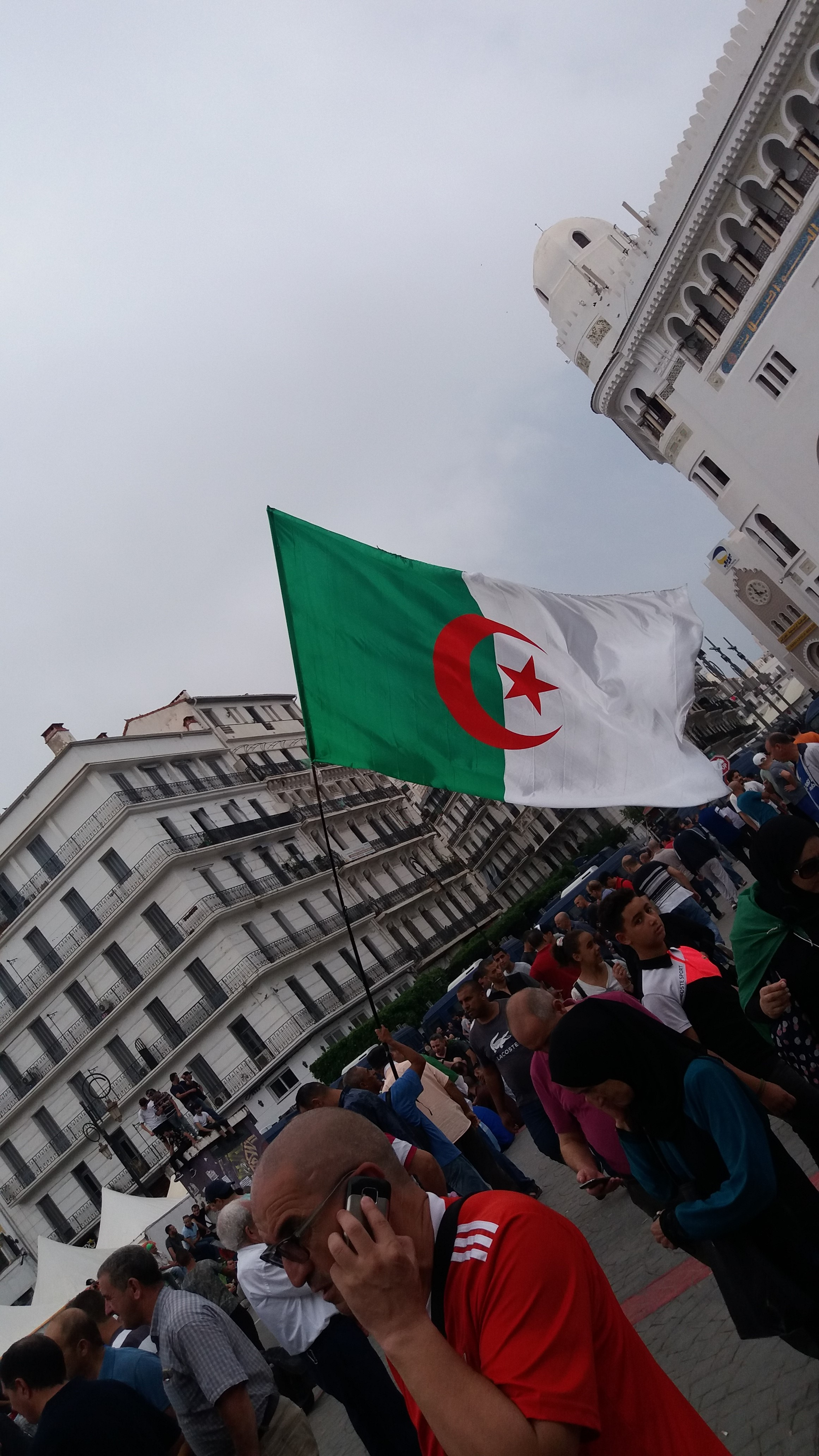
Demonstration in Algiers on September 20, 2019.

On 15 September, the government announced a presidential election to take place on 12 December. Demonstrations continued, calling for Ahmed Gaïd Salah and other members of the former Bouteflika governmental clique to resign. The authorities blocked road entries to the capital Algiers and arrested prominent protesters in preparation for the following Friday. protesters called for a general strike each Tuesday starting 24 September.

Protests continued for the 31st Friday on 20 September, with two thousand protesting in Béjaïa and two thousand in Bouïra, calling for Salah to resign, for the peaceful revolution to continue, and stating that it would be better to go to prison than to vote in the 12 December 2019 presidential election.

Detentions of prominent opposition members around 20 September included that of barrister Abdelhak Mellah from Boumerdès, who supports boycotting the 12 December presidential election; Karim Tabbou; Samir Belarbi; Fodil Boumala, accused of "attacking the integrity of national territory" and "attacking national unity"; Lakhdar Bouregaa; and 77-year old Garidi Hamidi, an "icon" of the protest movement.

=== November 2019 ===
On 1 November, the metro was shut down in Algiers and trains into the city were canceled as a result of a social media campaign calling for demonstrations. Police roadblocks also caused traffic jams. For the 37th weekly Friday protest, which coincided with the celebration of the 65th anniversary of the start of the Algerian War for independence from France, tens of thousands of demonstrators called for all members of the system of power in place to be dismissed and for a radical change in the political system. They rejected the 12 December election, with slogans describing it as "an election with the gangs" and as an "election organised by a corrupt power [which] is a trap for idiots" (French: les élections d'un pouvoir corrompu est un piège à cons).

On 15 November, the 39th successive Friday of protests included objections to the 12 December presidential election and calls for arrested protesters to be freed.

On 17 November, the day that the presidential election candidates opened their campaigns, protesters objecting to the election, perceiving it as a continuation of the same group of people retaining political power, posted sacks of garbage on panels allocated for presidential candidates' campaign posters. protester Smain described the symbolism by stating that the election "is completely rejected ... as garbage".

=== December 2019 ===
On 6 December, crowds in Algiers, Constantine, Oran, and in Kabylie were massive, calling for a boycott of the elections scheduled for the following week and for a general strike starting on 8 December.

The presidential election was held on 12 December 2019, despite wide popular opposition, with a turnout of 8% according to the Rally for Culture and Democracy or 39.88% officially, with Abdelmadjid Tebboune officially elected in the first round with 58.13% of the valid votes. During the three days around the election, 11–13 December 1200 protesters were detained by the authorities according to the CNLD. Later in December, the CNLD estimated that according to its records, 180 prisoners of conscience remained in prison, either under remand or serving sentences. Gaid Salah suffered a heart attack on the morning of 23 December 2019 and was rushed to a military hospital in Algiers, where he died a few hours later. He was 79 years old. His last public appearance was four days earlier when he received the National Order of Merit from President Abdelmadjid Tebboune.

=== January 2020 ===
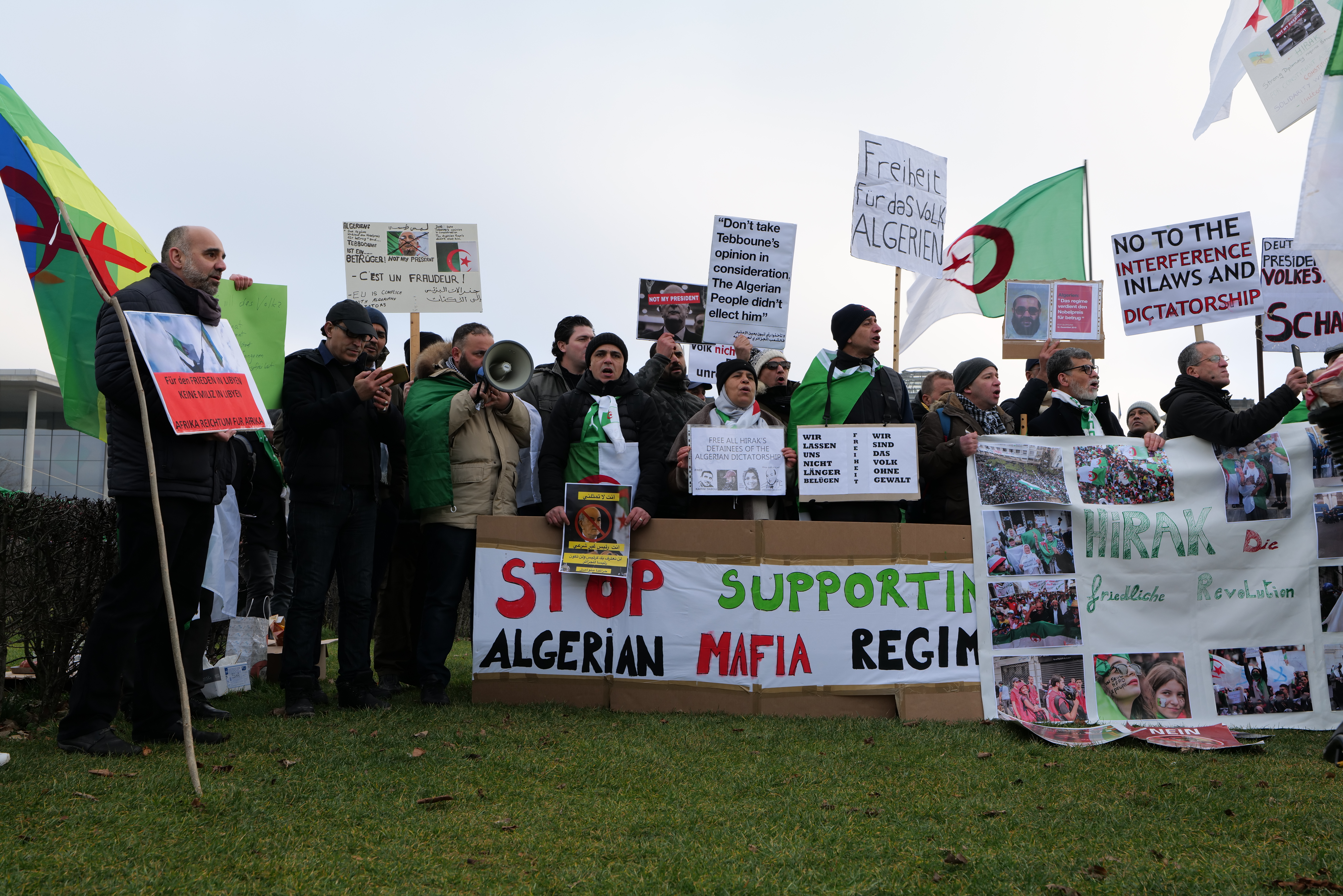
Demonstrators in Berlin, Germany, 19 January 2020

In the first week of January 2020, the new president elected in the mostly boycotted election, Abdelmadjid Tebboune, appointed Abdelaziz Djerad as prime minister and the rest of his cabinet mostly consisting of ministers of the previous government under Bensalah as acting president and Ahmed Gaid Salah as de facto leader of Algeria. On 2 January, 76 prisoners of conscience detained because of their protest actions were released, some of them conditionally. Protests continued.

On 15 January, 13 detainees held in El-Harrach prison since 1 March 2019 started a hunger strike, with the aim of getting a fair trial. Their cases had rested frozen for 10 months and their court appearances were scheduled for 16 March 2020.

In the 17 January Hirak protest marches, twenty of the first protesters to arrive in the morning were arrested in Algiers. As of 18 January 2020, Youth Action Rally (RAJ) estimated that a total of at least 100 Hirak prisoners of conscience were being held in Algerian prisons, while the CNLD estimated that 120 or more Hirak prisoners remained under detention.

=== February 2020 ===
In early February, close to the anniversary of the first protests on 16 and 22 February 2019, President Tebboune signed a decree pardoning several thousand prisoners, who were released from jail, but the Hirak protest prisoners of conscience were not included in the pardon.

=== March 2020 ===
On 20 March 2020, Algerian protesters heeded a presidential order over the coronavirus, and the pleas of some of their own leaders, by not staging their weekly demonstration against the ruling elite on Friday for the first time in over a year. Leading supporters of the protest movement, including imprisoned activist Karim Tabbou, human rights lawyer Mustafa Bouchachi and former minister Abdelaziz Rahabi, had urged the protesters to suspend their marches.

=== April 2020 ===
Abdallah Benadouda, an Algerian exile in the US with experience in Algerian public radio and private television (Dzaïr TV), started Radio Corona International 21 April 2020 to keep the Hirak flame alive during the lockdown. Benadouda encourages comparison to pirate radio in Europe in the 1970s and has discussed government crackdown on journalists (Khaled Draini) and opposition figures (Karim Tabbou).

=== October 2020 ===
On 5 October, Algerian protesters marked the 32nd anniversary of a pro-democracy movement, with hundreds of protesters gathering in the streets of the capital, Algiers.

On 9 October, following the rape and killing of a teenage girl, protests erupted in several cities across Algeria, decrying gender-based violence. The body of Chaïma, 19, was said to have been discovered in an abandoned petrol station in Thenia, 50 miles east of Algiers, earlier in the month. Chaïma's family revealed that she went missing after going out for a walk to pay her phone bill, and was subsequently stabbed, raped and allegedly burnt alive.

A constitutional referendum had previously been announced in July that was to be held in November as a result of the protests earlier in the year, but critics said it fails to address popular concerns of overreach by the government.

=== 2021 ===
5,000 people gathered in the town of Kherrata on 16 February to mark the second anniversary of the Hirak protest movement. Demonstrations had been suspended because of the COVID-19 pandemic in Algeria.

On 18 February, President Abdelmadjid Tebboune released 70 people who had been imprisoned for their participation in demonstrations, but that did not stop thousands from demonstrating on 22 February.

== Context ==
=== Protesters ===
These are the largest protests in Algeria since 2001. The demonstrators are primarily young people who did not experience the "Black Decade". One observer lauded the millennials' reappropriation of corporate branding to their own uses, as well as their respect for their living space through peaceful demonstrations, saying:

Algerian millennials thrive on positive messages. They flooded the web with images of young demonstrators kissing, handing flowers to police officers and women on international women's day, distributing water bottles, volunteering for first aid or encouraging people to clean the streets after the demonstrations.

Women's active role in the protests was credited with minimizing violence, and marked a sharp contrast with the 1988 protests predominantly led by salafists. An old mother of five unemployed children told the BBC: "There's nothing for the young generation," she said. "No jobs and no houses. They can't get married. We want this whole system to go."

Demonstrations also took place abroad, particularly in France, where 10,000 demonstrated in Paris on 8 March.

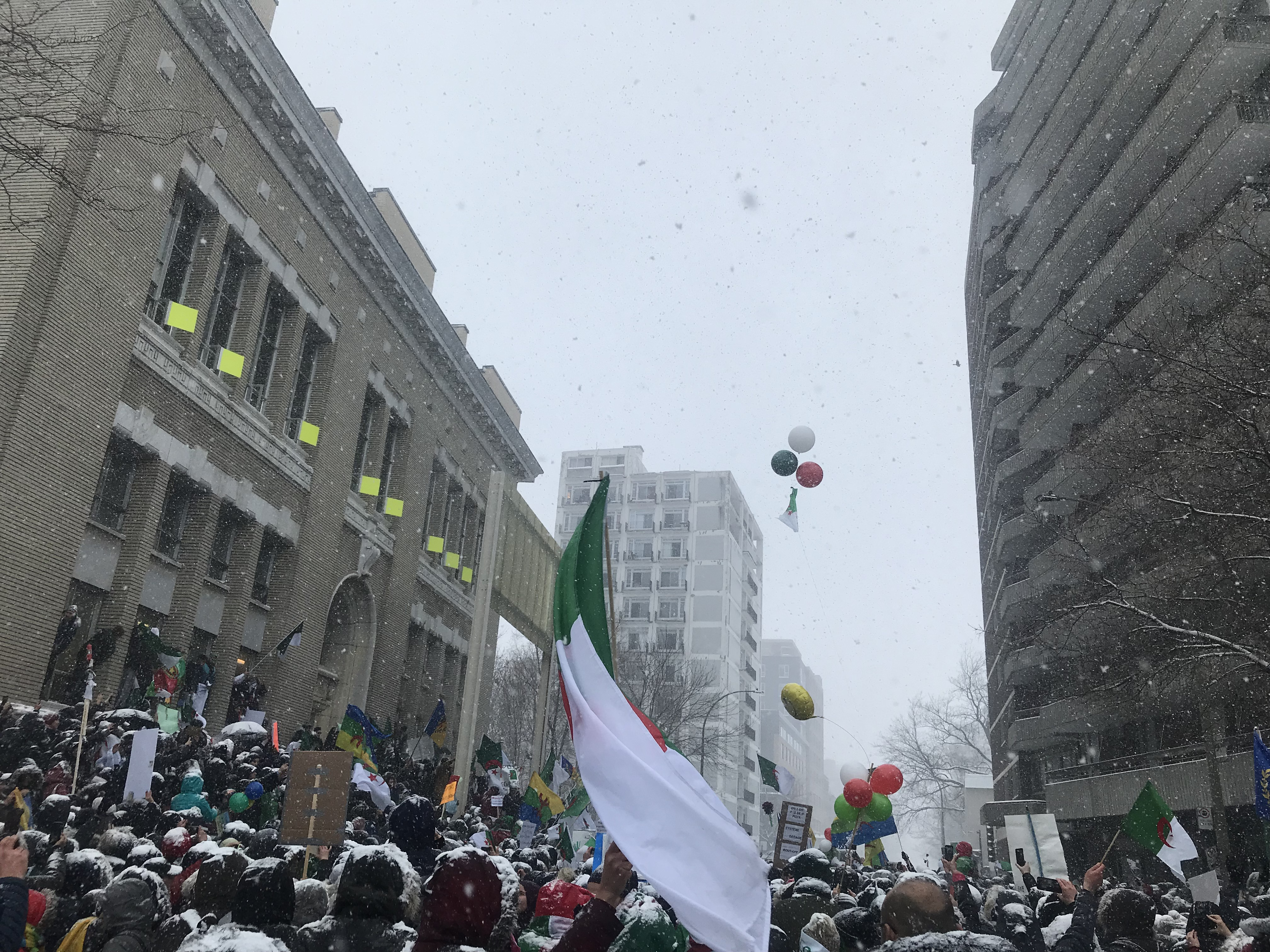
Demonstrators in Montréal (10 March).

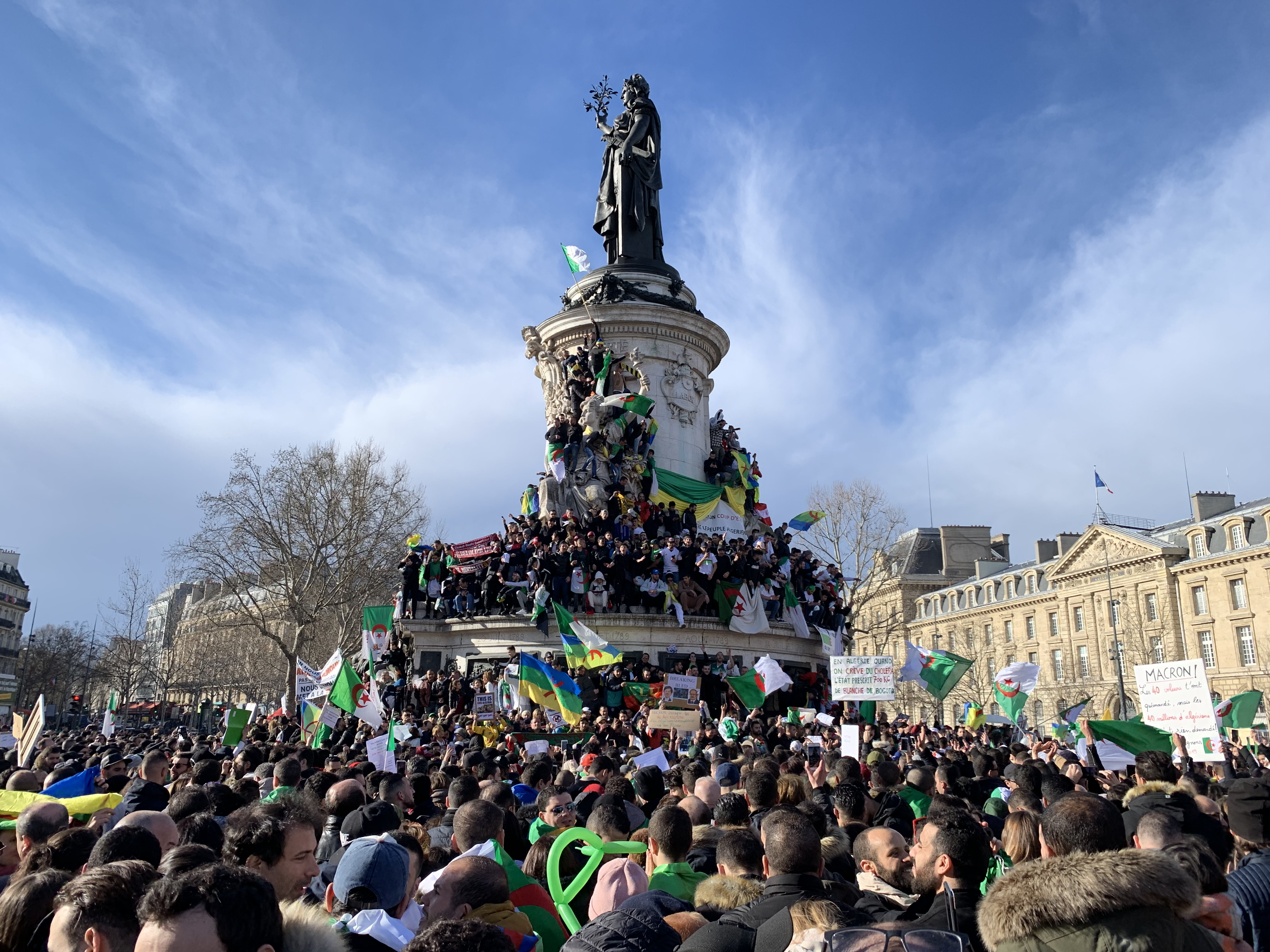
Demonstrators, Place de la République, Paris (17 March).

=== Goals ===
Originally the protesters wanted Abdelaziz Bouteflika to withdraw his candidacy for a fifth term and wanted Prime Minister Ahmed Ouyahia to step down. More generally, they called for massive housecleaning from the government of the ruling clans, known collectively as le pouvoir ("the power").

In conjunction with the president's withdrawal, the protesters called more and more for democracy, liberties and the rule of law, goals which many protests argue are unrealized and which continue to attract Algerians into the street.

=== Slogans, songs and symbols ===
Yetnahaw Gaa !, often written Yetnahaw ga3 !, or, in Algerian Arabic, (يتنحاو ڨاع), means "they should all go" and became a rallying cry after Bouteflika renounced his run for a fifth term.

Some slogans referred to the incumbent president as "the Moroccan" because of his birthplace and his reputed membership in a shadowy second Oudja Clan. Others, such as "bring back the commandos of the army and the BIS, there will be no fifth term" alluded to the baltaguias. By April, common slogans, placards, chants and hashtags included: "Leave means Leave" and "Throw them all out". Protesters in the capital chanted: "Bouteflika get out, and take Gaid Salah with you."

Songs such as "Libérer l'Algérie", written by artists supporting the movement, "Allô le système!" by Raja Meziane and "La liberté" by Soolking, became hits with the protesters upon their release.

Cachir, an emblematic Algerian sausage, was brandished and tossed around during demonstrations as a reminder of the 2014 elections when the press reported that Bouteflika's re-election committee was increasing attendance at their meetings by handing out free sandwiches filled with the sausage. In the protester's eyes, cachir had become a "symbol of corruption and of the 'buying of votes and souls.'" The Algerians have also employed humour and comedy to express dissent and discontent.

Algerian activist Hamza Hamouchene captured the following on his iPhone:

"Algeria, country of heroes that is ruled by zeros", "System change ... 99 percent loading", "We need Detol to kill 99.99 percent of the gang" [referring to members of the regime] And this one from a medical student: "We are vaccinated and we have developed anti-system IgGs (antibodies) ... and we keep getting boosters every Friday" "The problem is the persistence of idolatry and not the replacement of the idol"

Some slogans were directly targeting French complicity and interferences: "France is scared that if Algeria takes its independence it would ask for compensation for the metal it used to build the Eiffel tower" "Allo Allo Macron, the grandchildren of November '54 are back"

In reaction to calls by Gaid Salah to apply article 102 of the constitution, so the leader of the upper house would take over with elections to be held 90 days after the presidency is declared vacant by the constitutional council, people replied: "We want the application of article 2019 ... You are all going" "We asked for the departure of the whole gang, not the promotion of some of its members" "Batteries are dead so no need to squeeze them" "Dear system, you are a piece of s*** and I can prove it mathematically" "Here Algeria: the voice of the people. The number 102 is no longer in service. Please call people's service at 07" (in reference to article 07 stipulating that the people are the source of all sovereignty).

In Bordj Bou Arréridj, a city 200 km east of the capital Algiers, every Friday protesters have been hanging a new tifo since the fifth Friday. Displayed on an unfinished building renamed "The People's Palace", the banners bear cartoons and slogans, and as more Algerians from other cities have been pouring in every Friday the town has been named "The Capital of the Hirak" (The capital of the popular movement). The idea of the tifos is borrowed from the ultras groups which, according to sociologist Mark Doidge, were political protests in the 1960s and 1970s Italy.

=== Rioting ===
Although the rallies were generally peaceful, some vehicles were burned and shops were vandalized in the evening of demonstrations. On 1 March, clashes took place between the police and groups of young people throwing stones at them.

41 arrests were recorded on 23 February and 45 on 1 March including five men caught trying to haul away a safe. The police reported that "the majority of the people arrested were under the influence of psychotropic or hallucinogenic substances".

== Media coverage ==
Until 1 March 2019, public television, radio, and press totally ignored the demonstrations, while private television channels linked to the establishment dealt with them in a limited way. A boycott campaign was launched against the media. The editor-in-chief of Channel III, Meriem Abdou, resigned on 23 February as a protest against the treatment of the movement on the government-run radio station. Several journalists were arrested. A hundred journalists and the NGO Reporters Without Borders publicly denounced the censorship practiced by the Algerian executive. When state TV channels did begin mentioning the protests, they were critical of the protesters and did not refer to their motives. In contrast, private print media and news sites reported widely on events from the beginning.

Despite the opening of the audiovisual media to competition in 2011, off-shore channels can be shut down at any time because of their precarious legal status. One foreign media outlet, Al Jazeera, has been banned from Algeria since 2004.

On 4 March, Nadia Madassi, Canal Algérie's nightly news anchor for the past 15 years, resigned because she had been required to read a letter attributed to the president on the air.

On 5 March, Echorouk and El Bilad were sanctioned by the Ministries of Communication for having covered the demonstrations, and were cut off from advertising by the ANEP (national publishing and advertising agency).

== Results ==
=== Alliances of citizens' groups and dialogue ===
Women created the feminist collective Femmes algériennes pour un changement vers l'égalité on 16 March 2019, which pioneered the feminist square in the Friday Algiers protests to strengthen the political role of women in the protests. Citizens' associations and individuals created the Dynamiques de la société civile alliance on 15 June, which was later joined by trade unions, with the aim of coordinating proposals to reorganise the political structure of the Algerian state. On 26 June, political parties and the Algerian League for the Defense of Human Rights created the Forces of the Democratic Alternative alliance with similar aims, including the organising of a constituent assembly for a new political system with an independent judiciary.

On 6 July, the Forum civil pour le changement, created on 9 March 2019 by 70 citizens' groups and led by Abderrahmane Arara, and the Forces du changement held a conference at which they proposed the creation of a panel to dialogue with the government and in favour of the holding of a presidential election. The 13-person dialogue panel, the Instance nationale de dialogue et de médiation, was created and led by Karim Younes. The dialogue panel and the holding of the election were widely criticised by the protesters and by the Forces of the Democratic Alternative, who stated that the arrests of protesters for political reasons and the lack of basic conditions of democracy were conditions unsuitable for an election.

Citizens' groups to monitor the detentions of protest participants and call for their release were formed. The Network for fighting against repression was created on 1 June 2019 to call for the release of prisoners including Louisa Hanoune, the first woman to run for President of Algeria, and Hadj Ghermoul, a member of the Algerian League for the Defense of Human Rights. The National Committee for the Liberation of Detainees (CNLD) was created on 26 August 2019. In late December, several weeks after the presidential election won by Abdelmadjid Tebboune, the CNLD had documentation of 180 "Hirak" prisoners under remand or sentenced, and saw "no sign" of the government ceasing its frequent arrests of the protesters.

On 25 January 2020, 400 people from various political parties and citizens' associations participated in Algiers in a meeting organised by Forces of the Democratic Alternative. The conclusion of the meeting was to hold another meeting to organise the detailed methods and rules for implementing a democratic transition during which existing "illegitimate" institutions would be dismantled and for organising a constituent assembly.

=== Governmental institutions ===
On 11 March, it was announced that President Bouteflika would not seek re-election; that Prime Minister Ahmed Ouyahia had resigned and been replaced by Interior Minister Noureddine Bedoui; and that the April 2019 presidential election was postponed indefinitely. Inquiries were announced into "corruption and illicit overseas capital transfers" on 1 April 2019. Ali Haddad was arrested trying to cross the border into Tunisia after liquidating stock worth €38m. On the same day, Bouteflika promised to step down by the end of his term on 28 April.

On 2 April 2019, Bouteflika resigned as president, after being pressured by the military to step down immediately. Under Article 102 of the Algerian Constitution, he was succeeded as interim President by the President of the Council of the Nation, Abdelkader Bensalah, who was ineligible to run in the election for a successor, which according to law had to be held in the next 90 days.

The presidential election was finally held on 12 December 2019, despite wide popular opposition. The Rally for Culture and Democracy estimated the turnout in the election at 8% of the eligible electorate, interpreting the low turnout as a result of wide rejection of the election. The official turnout was 39.88%, with Abdelmadjid Tebboune officially elected in the first round with 58.13% of the valid votes, leaving it unnecessary to hold a second round of the election.

=== Constitutional amendment ===
On 7 May 2020, the preliminary draft of the constitutional amendment was published. It provides for the replacement of the post of First Minister by Head of Government, responsible to the Assembly, which can overthrow it by a motion of censure, the possibility for the President of the Republic to appoint a vice-president, the replacement of the Constitutional Council by a Constitutional Court, the retention of the limit on the number of presidential mandates to two, consecutive or not, or the limitation of the mandate of deputy to one re-election. In addition, the Hirak is inscribed in the preamble of the Constitution and the army is authorized to participate in theaters of operation abroad. Finally, the National Independent Election Authority (ANIE) is constitutionalised, the presidential third of the Council of Nation is abolished and the possibility of legislating by ordinance during parliamentary recess is abrogated.

On 8 September 2020, the final draft of the constitutional amendment was published. It revokes both of the vice-president post and the abolition of the presidential third of the Council of Nation.

== Influence ==
The weekend after Bouteflika stepped down, protesters in Sudan called upon the army to take their side against sitting president Omar al-Bashir. Despite the state of emergency and the emergency courts the President created to treat the protests, demonstrators staged a sit-in in the public space outside the Khartoum headquarters of the Armed Forces.

== Commentary ==
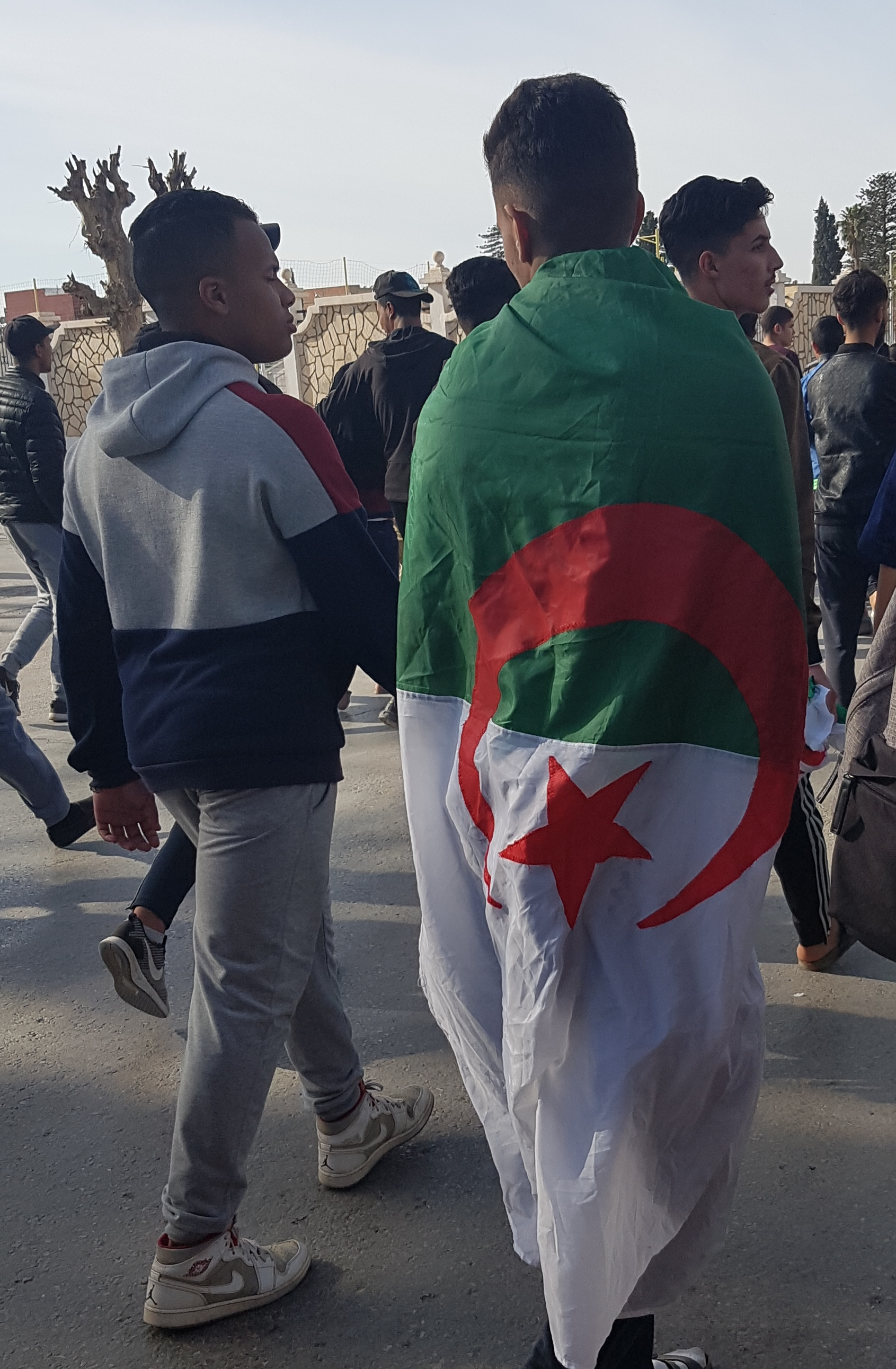
Demonstrator wrapped in the Algerian flag.

On 28 February 2019, the economist Omar Benderra asserted that a deep separation exists between civil society and the Algerian government, which outlawed street protests twenty years ago, and which he wrote is controlled by "warlords". Public opinion, Benderra continues, is suspicious of official government communication and has also begun to show signs of frustration with spiritual leaders urging the people to stay off the streets.

In Le Figaro on 1 March 2019, the Algerian writer Boualem Sansal said: "Such demonstrations in all the cities of the country and even in the capital, not far from El Mouradia (the district of the presidential palace), the Tagarins (the district of the Ministry of Defense), of Alger Centre (the district of the palace of the government), is an unbearable humiliation for the president, his brothers, his army, his police, his deputies, his senators, his oligarchs, his officials, his extra militias, in short, the "revolutionary family" (that's the name they give themselves), whom no one has ever disrespected without paying for it with his life."

Writing on openDemocracy, Hamza Hamouchene, a founder of the London-based Algeria Solidarity Campaign, summed up his view of the context of the revolt:

This decisive awakening on the part of the people and their growing political awareness are harbingers of good things to come and of the stormy days ahead for the profiteering caste and their foreign backers who have been scandalously enriching themselves. In the midst of increasing pauperization, unemployment, paralyzing austerity, the pillaging of resources, uneven development and corruption, the rationality of the current revolt and rebellion becomes absolutely clear.

Fahad Nabeel from the Centre of Strategic and Contemporary Research was less optimistic about the movement's success, suggesting that either the pouvoir or the military would consolidate control.

"The protests did emerge in part in response to elements of Algerian social life," wrote Amir Mohamed Aziz, "but they need to be situated in a broader context of African, Mediterranean and transnational political-economic dynamics." CNRS research fellow Nadia Marzouki observes that the Hirak protests continue the forms of collective moral protest that emerged after 2011 in the Middle East and North Africa (MENA) region writing, ""Movements such as the Hirak in Algeria, the "You Stink" revolution in Beirut, protests against police violence, racism, and environmental destruction throughout the region keep the politics of dignity alive in the MENA in times of unprecedented repression."

Algerian journalist Ghada Hamrouche doubted whether it was even possible to hold elections as promised by the interim president. Hamrouche considered elections within the current constitutional set up a diversion. Army chief Ahmed Gaid Salah and "the ruling class," she wrote, "are counting on the lure of elections to divide and weaken protesters' calls for a transition outside the framework of a constitution that keeps the regime in the driver's seat."

Ahmad Al-Sholi thinks that the Algerian regime is very entrenched and enjoys a good leverage generated by the revenues of the oil industry, a 'surplus' with which it could "co-opt large swaths of the population and oppositional forces. Despite the plummeting oil prices in the world market, the regime argues Al-Sholi, could attract foreign investment and still refill its coffers. On the other hand, although the Algerians showed an impressive energy and perseverance in mobilisation, it would be a mistake to expect hundreds of thousands of people to show up to protest indefinitely."

Some popular organization has to emerge now and present a roadmap that the masses could rally around, giving them a chance to catch their breath. The ruling regime is desperate to draw a red line against the protests and is intent on engaging in mass arrests. Fortunately, Algerians have significant industrial leverage to wield against their ruling class. What happens next depends on how this power is channeled to transform Algeria.

== Reactions ==
=== National ===
On 5 March, the National Organization of Mujahideen (the powerful organization of veterans of the Algerian War of Independence) announced by press release that they supported the demonstrations, lamenting "the collusion between both influential parties in the seat of power and unscrupulous businessmen who have profited illicitly from public money".

=== International ===
International reactions were cautious; most countries and international organizations remained silent until 5 March.

- Egypt: President Abdel Fattah el-Sisi criticised the protesters' motives on 10 March and warned that due to the protests, "the people, young children and future generations will pay the price – that of a lack of stability".
- European Union: The European Commission called for respect for the rule of law, including freedom of expression and assembly.
- France: Speaking in Djibouti on 12 March, president Emmanuel Macron welcomed Bouteflika's decision not to seek reelection and applauded the Algerian government's plan for a constitutional conference validated by a popular referendum after a "transition of reasonable length."
- Italy: Prime Minister Giuseppe Conte advised listening to "requests for change from civil society" and believed that "Algeria will be able to guarantee a democratic and inclusive process with respect for its people and for its own benefit".
- Morocco: Given the tense relations between Algeria and Morocco, the Moroccan government has not issued any official statement regarding the protests.
- Russia: Newly-appointed deputy prime minister Ramtane Lamamra began a diplomatic tour in Moscow, where he met with Sergei Lavrov, who said in a joint press conference on 19 March that "Moscow does not meddle in the internal affairs of Algeria", adding that it was "up to the Algerian people to determine their destiny on the basis of their constitution and international laws."
- Tunisia: Although Tunisia's president Beji Caid Essebsi has stated that the Algerian people were "free to express themselves on their own governance as they wish", no further comment regarding the Tunisian government's stance on the events was made. Demonstrations were organized on 9 March during which Tunisian civilians showed their solidarity with their Algerian counterparts.
- United States: The US State Department issued a statement saying that the country "supports the Algerian people and their right to demonstrate peacefully."

== See also ==
- Yetnahaw Gaa !
- Berber Spring
- 1988 October Riots
- Black Spring (Algeria)
- 2010–2012 Algerian protests
- Abdelaziz Bouteflika
- Amira Bouraoui
- List of protests in the 21st century
  - Sudanese revolution (2018–2019)
  - 2019 Egyptian protests
- December 1960 protests in Algeria
- 2021 Algerian protests
- 2019 Venezuelan protests
