= National Committee for the Liberation of Detainees =

Organization based in Algeria

- Established: 26 August 2019 (6 years ago)
- Types: voluntary association
- Aim: human rights in Algeria
- Country: Algeria
- Chairpersons: Kaci Tansaout

The National Committee for the Liberation of Detainees or CNLD (French: Comité national pour la libération des détenus) is an Algerian citizens' group created on 26 August 2019 during the "Hirak" 2019 Algerian protests, with the aim of supporting and obtaining the release of political prisoners and prisoners of conscience.

== Creation and structure ==
The National Committee for the Liberation of Detainees (CNLD) was created on 26 August 2019 by lawyers, families of political prisoners and prisoners of conscience, human rights activists and intellectuals.

The founding coordinator of the CNLD was Kaci Tansaout.

== Methods ==
The CNLD has legal, solidarity and communication committees. In its communications strategy, the CNLD considers the national and international circulation of reports about "every detention, arrest or abuse" as a key "principle".

== Pre-election detentions ==
When the CNLD was created on 26 August 2019, its coordinator, Tansaout, stated that there were 42 prisoners of conscience in Algiers, some having been detained since June 2019. He considered the detentions to be illegal and interpreted them as a method of blackmail by the government to persuade the Hirak protestors to accept the holding of the 2019 Algerian presidential election on 12 December 2019.

On 9 September, the CNLD announced the release of Hakim Aissi, who risked up to 10 years of imprisonment for "assaulting national unity" for having carried the Berber flag during Hirak protests. Aissi had been detained on 5 July. He was found not guilty by the Mostaganem court. The CNLD at the time estimated that about 40 Hirak prisoners were detained in Algiers for having carried the Berber flag.

On 6 October, the CNLD saw a pattern of harassment by security forces: "a hunt operation" and "kidnappings" of members of the CNLD, of Rassemblement actions jeunesse, of the Network for fighting against repression (created on 1 June 2019), and of detainees' family members. The CNLD had 81 detainees documented, and the cases of 13 demonstrators arrested in early March 2019 for "destruction of public property" were under discussion by the CNLD lawyers.

In late November, Tansaout estimated the number of detainees since June at more than 200. He considered the authorities to be using violence and detentions with the aim of provoking demonstrators into responding violently, justifying increased repression and leading to a "state of emergency eagerly sought by [chief of staff of the Algerian army] Gaid Salah". Tansaout criticised the detainees' prison conditions, including solitary confinement of some detainees, a surgical operation carried out without informing either the detainee's family or lawyer, prison cell overcrowding and the lack of drinking water.

== Post-election detentions ==
On 17 December, after Abdelmadjid Tebboune's 12 December election as president, Tansaout expected repression by the authorities to continue. He stated that the CNLD recorded 1200 arrests during the three days from 11 to 13 December. He interpreted "the army still [remaining] in control of political decisions. A week later, Tansaout noted the 23 December release of 13 prisoners of opinion, after they had served a six-month term, but overall saw "no sign of deescalation by the regime". According to Tansaout, Tebboune "didn't even murmur a single word about the detainees" during his electoral campaign.

On 20 December, Farid Hami of the CNLD was "kidnapped in Algiers during a march" but soon freed. This was interpreted by Tansaout as one of many incidents of intimidation by the security services.

In late December, the El-Harrach Prison detention conditions remained bad. One prisoner who had just been released, Messaoud Leftici, had been "placed in a room 2 square metres (22 ft^{2}) in area, without light". Tansaout stated that there was strong volunteer support for the detainees from lawyers, psychologists and medical personnel. The CNLD estimated that there were 180 Hirak protestor detainees, counting from the end of June, who were either under remand or had been sentenced to prison terms.

== See also ==
- Femmes algériennes pour un changement vers l'égalité
