= Karim Younes =

Algerian politician

- ريم يونس

Ombudsman of the Republic
- In office February 17, 2020 – May 18, 2021
- Preceded by: Position established
- Succeeded by: Brahim Merad

General Coordinator of the National Dialogue and Mediation Authority
- In office July 25 – September 8, 2019
- Preceded by: Position established
- Succeeded by: Position abolished

President of the People's National Assembly
- In office June 10, 2002 – June 3, 2004
- Preceded by: Abdelkader Bensalah
- Succeeded by: Amar Saadani

Personal details
- Born: January 1, 1948 (age 78) Bejaia, French Algeria (now Algeria)
- Party: FLN (until 2004)
- Education: University of Algiers 1

Karim Younes is an Algerian politician and author who served as the president of the People's National Assembly from 2002 to 2004, and as Ombudsman of Algeria from 2020 to 2021 in the wake of the Hirak protests.

== Biography ==
Younes was born on January 1, 1948, in Béjaïa, Algeria. He graduated with a degree in French literature from the University of Algiers in 1978.

From June 1997 to May 2002, Younes served as the Minister of Vocational Training. In June 2002, he was elected President of the People's National Assembly, the lower house of the Algerian parliament. He resigned from this position on April 8, 2004, also leaving the FLN. In the 2004 Algerian presidential election, Younes supported Ali Benflis. On April 5, 2014, Younes held a pro-Benflis rally in Paris.

=== Hirak ===
On July 18, 2019, the Civil Forum for Change proposed a panel of thirteen people including Younes for a dialogue with the Algerian government. That same month, Younes had become the leader of a panel intended to engage in dialogue with the Algerian government to resolve the Hirak crisis. Other members on the panel were Mouloud Hamrouche, Mokdad Sifi, Ahmed Taleb Ibrahimi, Djamila Bouhired, Fatiha Benabou, Nacer Djabi, Mustapha Bouchachi, Islam Benattia, Lyes Merabet, Nafissa Lahreche, Smail Lalmas, and Aicha Zenai. Younes was strongly criticized by demonstrators who accused him of sympathizing with the government when beneficial for him.

Younes said that the Hirak demonstrators had set certain conditions as a prerequisite for any dialogue: release of protesters imprisoned for carrying the Berber flag, cessation of police violence during demonstrations, freedom of access to the capital on days of demonstrations, less media censorship, and the departure of the current Algerian government. That same day, Ahmed Gaid Salah, the vice-minister of National Defense and Chief of Staff of the Algerian Army, rejected these prerequisites, even though head of state Abdelkader Bensalah had considered himself "willing and able to take appeasement measures."

On August 31, Younes proposed that Parliament vote on a law amending the electoral code and another creating a national authority for organizing elections. After this, the only demands were for presidential candidates to follow a charter of honor respecting the conclusions of the panel, and the departure of the Bedoui government. On September 8, Bensalah instructed Younes to prepare the establishment of the body organizing presidential elections. The laws were approved by Parliament on September 17.

On February 17, 2020, Younes was appointed Ombudsman of the Republic by Abdelmadjid Tebboune. He was dismissed from this role on May 18, 2021, although efforts to do his job were hampered by the Algerian government.

== Authorship ==
Younes has published five works on Algerian history and the French colonization of Algeria; From Numidia to Algeria: Grandeurs and Ruptures (2012), The Fall of Granada and the New Geography of the World (2014), At the Gates of the Future: Twenty Centuries of Resistance, Fifty Years of Independence (2014), and The Spurs of Conquest (2017).
