= 2021 Algerian protests =

2021 protests in Algeria

- Part of the Hirak
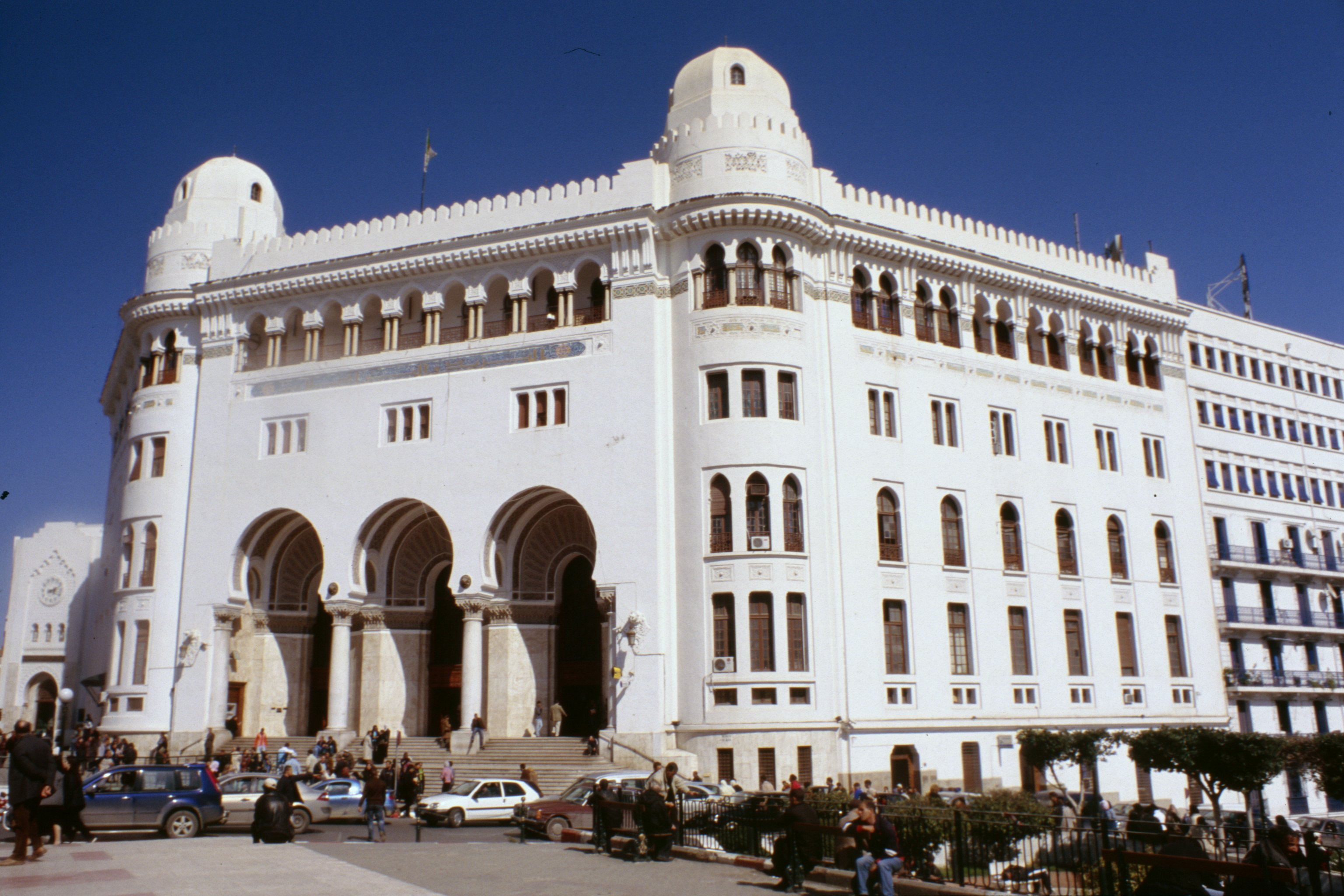
- Focal point for demonstrations
- Date: 22 February 2021 – 30 April 2021 (2 months, 1 week and 1 day)
- Location: Algeria
- Caused by: Failure to fulfill the demands of the Hirak; Hirak anniversary; Political corruption; Government mishandling of the COVID-19 pandemic
- Goals: Resignation of President Abdelmadjid Tebboune; Resignation of Prime Minister Abdelaziz Djerad
- Methods: Demonstrations; Protest marches; Online activism
- Status: Ended

Parties
Anti-government protestors	Government of Algeria: Ministry of Interior and local authorities; Directorate General for National Security

Lead figures
Non-centralized leadership	Abdelmadjid Tebboune; (Algeria) Abdelaziz Djerrad; (Algeria) Kamel Beldjoud

Deaths and injuries
- Deaths: 0
- Injuries: unknown

The 2021 Algerian protests were a series of mass protests, nationwide rallies and peaceful demonstrations in Algeria against the government of Abdelmadjid Tebboune and the military. They were first held on the anniversary of the 2019–2020 Algerian protests, which resulted in the ousting of the government of Abdelaziz Bouteflika, after he announced his fifth term for the 2019 Algerian presidential election. Tens of thousands have since 16 February thronged the streets, using and echoing their voices to make them heard, such as "Algeria, Free, Democratic, No Gang in Power".

== Background ==
The preceding 2019–2020 Algerian protests were against President Abdelaziz Bouteflika's announcement of a fifth term for the 2019 Algerian presidential election. This would result in the resignation of Bouteflika and his cabinet.

== Protests ==
The first protests started on 16 February (the anniversary of the 2019–2020 protests) in Kherrata and Algiers, followed by dozens of other towns and cities nationwide holding subsequent rallies; these would be referred to as the Hirak. The protest movement gained momentum when tens of thousands of protesters marched nationwide on 22 February, after 6 days of massive nonviolent anti-government protest rallies across the nation. Several protesters were draped in Algerian flags and waved other flags and used slogans, chanting against the government and president.

Tens of thousands blocked streets in the largest street demonstrations since 2019, using non-violence, and engaged into peacefulness. In Béjaïa, demonstrators was confronted by police, and was blocked off by the security forces. Protesters chanted and marched, forming chains and using placards and flags, banners and masks in the protests. Most of their demands were the same from the 2019–2020 Algerian protests, alongside calling for new elections.

The protests would be the largest in the country and the countrywide strikes and massive nonviolent strike movement, protest rallies and anti-government demonstrations and street marches would be hitting 12-16 cities and towns nationwide. President Abdelmadjid Tebboune ordered tight police presence deputed the growing civil disobedience amid street rallies and unrest. The national movement's slogans was not the same as last time. They chanted "a civilian state, not a military state" and "the gang must go" as they brandished Berber and Algerian flags.

On Friday 26 February, protesters again poured into the streets in their thousands, protesting against the government and chanting Peaceful, Peaceful. Thousands of protesters were draped in Algerian flags amidst cold weather, defying police restrictions, protesting in large numbers and crowding around the Grand Post Office, where police subsequently used tear gas and truncheons.

Riots broke out on 1 March in Ouargla after protesters hurled stones at police and set fires to tyres in protest at the arrest of Ameur Guerrache. Roadblocks and barricades was made as police fired tear gas and quelled the unrest. The protesters chanted slogans calling for his release.

For a second consecutive week, thousands of students accompanied by supporters and lecturers marched in Algiers, defying the curfew and was blocked by police, who was present in the protests. On 2 March, shouting slogans demanding "a free and democratic Algeria" and an end to the military's domination of the North African country, up to 3,000 participated in the student-led protests, however, clashes broke out after police tried to block protesters from reaching the Grand Post Office and the Casbah. In Algiers, tens of thousands of people took to the streets at the end of February to voice their demands for an end to corruption and despotism, and for democratic reforms and genuine political change. Thousands led student-led marches nationwide as well, with holding banners and chanting anthems, using roses and wearing flag-style masks, chanting Peaceful and slogans against president Abdelmadjid Tebboune and the powerful military. The Hirak pro-democracy movement intensified throughout the nation. The protesters chanted "Civilian State, Not Military, We Will Not Stop Until Our Demands of Hirak Is Met!" as thousands of student-protesters rallied in demonstrations in Algiers.

On Friday 5 March, rallies kicked off again as demonstrators rallied again on 5 March, protesting against the military and political elite in Algiers, reviving the 2-year old Hirak pro-democracy movement and calling for the entire cabinet and elite to quit power and transfer power as soon as possible, draped under the Algerian flag. Protesters chanted "Thieves, you’ve destroyed our country" and "نريد جزائر أفضل", meaning "We Want A Better Algeria". Thousands of anti-government protesters and Hirak supporters rallied as part of the weekly protests in Kherrata, and other cities nationwide. Police maintained a heavy presence but didn't interfere in the protests and rallies. The protesters chanted in the biggest protest marches in 2 weeks, chanting It's either you or us. Thousands protested and chanted anthems, waved flags and clapped in solidarity with the 2019 protests in Algiers. Human Rights Watch has warned over the deteriorating human rights conditions as helicopters hovered around the protesters.

On 12 March, large protests was held across Algiers, rejecting early legislative elections announced the day before, as weekly rallies by the resurgent Hirak pro-democracy movement gain momentum. President Abdelmadjid Tebboune announced legislative elections for 12 June, chanting "لا انتخابات مع عصابات المافيا "و" دولة مدنية لا عسكرية ". People also took to the streets in other parts of the country, including northwestern Oran, central Tizi Ouzou and eastern Annaba. Tens of thousands of female students now demonstrate side by side with the elderly, lawyers next to the unemployed, doctors with sanitation workers.

On 19 March, thousands protested in Algiers to protest for press freedom, judicial independence and improvement of freedom of expression. "Return the power to the people", protesters demanded, addressing the ruling class. Demonstrators also criticised President Abdelmadjid Tebboune's decision to call early elections on June 12 in an attempt to assuage the country's political and economic crisis. Tebboune has reached out to the protest movement while also seeking to neutralise it. "No elections with the mafia gang (in power)", protesters chanted. Local media reported demonstrations in several other cities, despite poor weather.

On 26 March, protesters held marches calling for reforms due to economic crisis and political tensions, students were arrested during rallies in Algiers. On 28 March, women and young men chanted slogans and demanded the government to release the students arrested during recent demonstrations. The students were later released.

On April 2, Tens of thousands of demonstrators marched peacefully in huge peaceful protests commemorating the ouster of former president Abdelaziz Bouteflika. Many participants sang, brandished the Algerian flag and shouted slogans that included "No to the military state" and "We won’t stop until the Hirak wins" under the watch of police helicopters. Similar marches were organized in other cities across the country, including Annaba, Oran and Kherrata. Some of the protesters in the capital chanted for the "independence of justice" and "press freedom," a reference to journalists and activists who have been arrested and sent to trial amid the Hirak protests. The protesters called for judicial independence as well, as of now, calling for the president Abdelmadjid Tebboune to resign is their main goal. Protesters rallied in front of buildings, calling for the release of political prisoners as well.

On April 18, firefighters in Algiers demonstrated over the president Abdelmadjid Tebboune's social policies. On April 25, civil protection personnel marched in uniform to the Algerian presidential palace alongside firefighters demanding increased salaries and improved housing in Algiers. On May 2, police fired tear gas and rubber bullets to disperse thousands of firefighters and engineers. Firefighters had gathered there to demand increased salaries and the provision of social housing, amid other demands.

Thousands of Algerians marched through the capital on 23 April, denouncing what they said were sweeping arrests of members of the Hirak pro-democracy protest movement. A hunger strike begun on 23 April in Algiers to denounce prison conditions and issues with police brutality. On 27 April, hundreds of students demonstrated in Algiers, but forcibly dispersed by police officers.

On April 30, thousands of supporters and members of the opposition movement or Hirak Movement took to the streets of Algiers, testing the police over the brutal and lethal use of unnecessary force to break up demonstrations, and called on president Abdelmadjid Tebboune to resign. Marches also took place in other parts of the country, including Annaba, Constantine, Kabylia, Béjaïa and Tizi Ouzou.

== Slogans ==
"Karama" (Arabic: كرامة) is a popular slogan used among protesters, meaning "dignity". Other slogans such as "No Gang" (Arabic: لا عصابة), "Civilian State" (Arabic: دولة مدنية), "Our Demands are Legitimate" (Arabic: مطالبنا مشروعة), and "Freedom" (Arabic: حرية) have also been used. "Silmiya wa Hadi'a" (Arabic: سلمية وهادئة) is another revived slogan, meaning "peaceful and quiet". "Not a Military State, You Must Go" (Arabic: ليست دولة عسكرية ، يجب أن تذهب) is the most heard slogan during weekly protests over the last 3 weeks. "The Right to Defend Our Rights" was a slogan heard during nationwide marches on 2 March.

== See also ==
- 2019–2020 Algerian protests
