= Wassila network =

Algerian women's rights institution network

- Established: 2000 (26 years ago)
- Types: nonprofit organization
- Aim: women's rights
- Country: Algeria

The Wassila network (French: réseau Wassila) or l'Association contre les violences faites aux femmes et aux enfants or Avife (Association against violence done to women and children) is a network of Algerian citizens' groups and institutions that defend women's rights, established in October 2000.

== Creation and structure ==
The Wassila network was created in October 2000, near the end of the Algerian Civil War, a context within which women's rights were under attack both practically and legally. The network is named after a girl called Wassila who was adopted and abandoned and became a single mother.

In 2011, the network included 28 citizens' associations and institutions. Member groups in 2013 included SOS Children's Villages, Atustep, Tharwa Fadhma n’Soumer, the Association pour l'émancipation des femmes, Sarp, Amusnaw, Djazaïrouna, medical and mental health professionals, lawyers and human rights activists.

== Aims ==
The Wassila network aims to obtain equal rights for women both in the legal system and in fighting against rape and other violence against women, including "massive marital violence". The network also handles sexual abuse of children. According to the Wassila network, 80% of its documented cases concern violence within the home.

== Actions ==
The Wassila network published a "White paper of testimonies" of women victims of violence. According to the network, immolation, torture and murder became commonplace against Algerian women.

The network has three branches of action: developing practical help for victims (including a telephone support helpline and legal aid), training of medical, legal and media personnel, and legal approaches (include criminal law against sexual violence).

The network received between 800 and 2000 calls for help on its telephone helpline during 2011–2013.

The Wassila network published a statement following the "punitive expedition" attacks on women workers in Hassi Messaoud, known for the 2001 Hassi Messaoud mob attacks against women. The network stated that neither local nor national authorities protected the women from a systematic pattern of violence.

=== Hirak ===
On 16 March 2019, during the "Hirak" 2019 Algerian protests, Saadia Gacem and Faïka Medjahed, members of the Wassila network, together with other women, signed a declaration establishing Femmes algériennes pour un changement vers l'égalité (Algerian women for a shift towards equality), calling for "full and complete equality between female and male citizens, without distinction of gender, class, regional origin of beliefs", announcing the creation of a "feminist square French: carré féministe which will be located each Friday in front of the main gate of the Algiers 1 University starting from 13:00" and calling for "taking into account equal representation of women in any citizens' initiative aiming to solve" the issues of the Hirak protests.

Later during the Hirak protests, an alliance of trade unions, citizens' groups and individuals, the Dynamiques de la société civile, was created in a meeting on 15 June 2019, with the aim of coordinating with other Algerian citizens' networks in fundamentally reorganising the Algerian state. The Wassila network withdrew from the 15 June conference, on the grounds that the meeting "'did not stated clearly and unambiguously the fundamental and non-negotiable political principle of equality between men and women.
