= Hadj Ghermoul =

Hadj Ghermoul (born circa 1980–1982) is an Algerian human rights defender, member of the National Committee for the Defense of the Rights of the Unemployed and of the Algerian League for the Defense of Human Rights. At the end of January 2019, Ghermoul and Rezouane Kada were among the first to denounce the fifth term of Abdelaziz Bouteflika. They displayed in a public place a sign "No to a fifth term" and the image of the event circulated on Facebook. Ghermoul was arrested and sentenced to six months in prison and a fine. He was released on July 20, 2019 after serving his sentence and was again sentenced to 18 months in prison on December 25, 2019.

== Local conflict in 2014 ==
On March 3, 2014, Hadj Ghermoul wished to discuss with the head of the daïra of Tizi, where he lived. The chief refused. According to the Algerian League for the Defense of Human Rights (LADDH), of which Ghermoul was a member. Ghermoul and his cousin protested the refusal of the head of the daïra to receive them on the very day of the hearings. Hadj Ghermoul was sentenced to three months in prison and a fine for “insulting an official institution”

== Hirak in 2019 ==
=== Demonstration and arrest ===
At the end of January 2019, Ghermoul and Rezouane Kada denounced the fifth presidential term for which Abdelaziz Bouteflika was running.

They hold up a sign “No to a fifth term” in a public place in Tizi. The image of the event is circulating on Facebook. Ghermoul was imprisoned on January 27 and sentenced on February 7 in a court in the Mascara Province to six months in prison and a fine of 30,0006. or 300,000 dinars.

Authorities justified his arrest by saying Ghermoul was drunk, insulted the police when they approached him following a noise complaint. Ghermoul's family denied the police version and said that the police had intimidated Ghermoul in order to provoke him. According to Front Line Defenders, it was the police who allegedly insulted Ghermoul. Ghermoul asked in response that he could be formally detained or be left alone. The officers took him to the police station.

Ghermoul was first detained at Sidi Mhammed Prison in Mascara, then transferred to a prison in Reggane. on April 1 a street march, in support of Ghermoul, was organized in front of the Mascara Court.

=== Hirak prisoner of conscience ===
Ghermoul and Kada were then seen by the demonstrators as being among the first Hirak activists. Ghermoul is a prisoner of conscience according to the Hirak and his portrait is brandished during the Hirak Friday marches. The distance of Reggane and Tizi from the major Algerian urban centers makes it difficult to support Hirak activists.

Ghermoul was released on July 20, 2019 after serving his sentence. He was “very tired” on his release from prison and did not say anything.

On December 25, 2019, the National Committee for the Release of Prisoners (CNLD) announced that Ghermoul was sentenced again to 18 months in prison.
