= Brahim Merad =

Algerian politician

- إبراهيم مراد
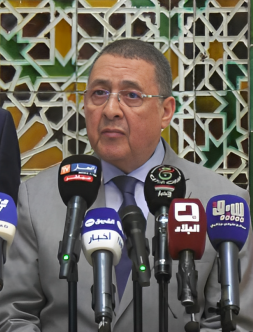
- Merad in 2023

Minister of State, Minister of Interior and Local Authorities
- Incumbent
- Assumed office 14 October 2026
- President: Abdelmadjid Tebboune
- Prime Minister: Sifi Ghrieb
- Preceded by: Saïd Sayoud
- In office 9 September 2022 – 15 September 2025
- President: Abdelmadjid Tebboune
- Prime Minister: Aymen Benabderrahmane; Nadir Larbaoui; Sifi Ghrieb (Acting)
- Preceded by: Kamel Beldjoud
- Succeeded by: Saïd Sayoud (Note: as Minister of Interior, Local Authorities and Transport)

Minister of State in charge of Inspection of State Services and Local Authorities
- In office 15 September 2025 – 13 October 2026
- President: Abdelmadjid Tebboune
- Prime Minister: Sifi Ghrieb
- Preceded by: Office established

Mediator of the Republic
- In office 20 May 2021 – 18 September 2022
- President: Abdelmadjid Tebboune
- Prime Minister: Abdelaziz Djerad; Aymen Benabderrahmane
- Preceded by: Karim Younes
- Succeeded by: Madjid Ammour

Personal details
- Born: 22 August 1953 (age 73) Batna Province, French Algeria
- Education: École nationale d'administration

Brahim Merad (Arabic: إبراهيم مراد; born 22 August 1953) is an Algerian politician who has been serving as Minister of State, Minister of Interior and Local Authorities (Note: Formerly known as the Ministry of Interior, Local Authorities and National Planning) since October 2026. He previously held the portfolio from September 2022 to September 2025, before being appointed Minister of State in charge of Inspection of State Services and Local Authorities.

== Education ==
Merad graduated at the École nationale d'administration.

== Career ==
Merad began his administrative career as wali of Annaba. from 1995 to 1997. He later served as wali of Tiaret, Boumerdes, Médéa and Tizi Ouzou.

He also worked as advisor to the President of the Republic in charge of grey areas.

On 20 May 2021, he took office as Mediator of the Republic. On 9 September 2022, he served as Minister of the Interior.

During the 2024 Algerian presidential election, he was appointed director of Abdelmadjid Tebboune's electoral campaign on 5 August 2024. On 14 September 2025, Tebboune appointed him as Minister of State in charge of the General Inspectorate of State Services and Local Authorities, an office he assumed the following day.

He was reappointed as Minister of Interior on 13 October 2026, taking office the following day.

== Personal life ==
Merad is married and has five children.
