= Dynamiques de la société civile =

- Established: 15 June 2019 (6 years ago)
- Types: voluntary association
- Aim: regime change
- Country: Algeria

The Dynamiques de la société civile are an alliance of trade unions, citizens' associations and individuals created during the 2019 Algerian protests, Hirak, in a meeting on 15 June 2019. The Dynamiques stated that they would coordinate with other networks of Algerian civil society with the aim of fundamentally reorganising the political structure of the Algerian state.

== Aims ==
Lyes Merabet of the Confédération des syndicats algériens (Confederation of Algerian trade unions, CSA) described the aim of the second meeting of the Dynamiques, on 24 August 2019, as being to get together civil society, political parties that had not pledged loyalty to the former Algerian president, and respected individuals to develop consensus on a roadmap for reorganising the Algerian political structures.

== Creation and membership ==
The founding meeting of the Dynamiques de la société civile was held on 15 June 2019 as a meeting of civil society. The creation of the Dynamiques was signed by the Civil society collective for a democratic and peaceful transition (French: Collectif de la société civile pour une transition démocratique et pacifique).

The Wasilla network of Algerian feminist organisations withdrew from the 15 June meeting, on the grounds that the group "'didn't clearly and unambiguously support the fundamental and non-negotiatble political principle' of equality between men and women".

Membership of the Dynamiques de la société civile includes the Confédération des syndicats algériens (CSA), including 15 of its autonomous trade union members, medical professionals' groups, FOREM (created by Mostefa Khiati), the Algerian Society of General Medicine, SNAPO, Rassemblement actions jeunesse (RAJ), El Baraka, El Irshad wa el-Islah and the Algerian think tank Notre Algérie Bâtie sur de Nouvelles Idées (NABNI).

== Relations with other groups ==
The Dynamiques de la société civile aim to coordinate with the Forces of the Democratic Alternative created on 26 June 2019, the Forces of Change (French: Forces du changement) of the 6 July coordinated by Rahabi and with individuals including Abdelhouahab Fersaoui of RAJ and Hakim Addad.

The Dynamiques stated their independence from the 13-person dialogue and mediation panel led by Karime Younes in July 2019. Lyes Merabet of the CSA stated in August that the panel could have been complementary to the work of the Dynamiques.

== Actions ==
The Dynamiques planned a meeting on 17 August 2019 to follow their initial 15 June meeting, but administrative delays forced them to delay the meeting and hold it on 24 August.

At an 11 November 2019 meeting of leaders of the Dynamiques, plans for a third meeting were announced by Bousalem Amoura, president of the Syndicat national des travailleurs de l'éducation et de la formation (National Union of Educational Workers, Satef).

== See also ==
- Forces of the Democratic Alternative- Algerian Hirak alliance
