= El Bilad TV =

El Bilad / البلاد تيفي
- Country: Algeria
- Broadcast area: Europe, Africa, Middle East
- Network: El Bilad
- Headquarters: Algiers, Algeria

Programming
- Languages: Arabic and French
- Picture format: 4:3 (576i, SDTV)

History
- Launched: March 19, 2014

Links
- Website: www.elbilad.net (Arabic)

El Bilad (Arabic: البلاد تيفي) is an Arabic-language satellite television channel military broadcasting from Algiers.

== Programming ==
=== Current affairs ===
- Report (بورتري)
- El Bilad Voice (صوت البلاد)
- Life Taught Me (علمتني الحياة), By youcef Zaghba

=== Animated series ===
- The Pink Panther (الفهد الوردي; 2016)
