= Femmes algériennes pour un changement vers l'égalité =

Women's organization created during the 2019 Algerian Hirak protests

- Established: 16 March 2019 (6 years ago)
- Types: nonprofit organization
- Aim: women's rights
- Country: Algeria

Femmes algériennes pour un changement vers l'égalité (Algerian women for a change towards equality) or FACE is a women's organisation created during the 2019 Algerian "Hirak" protests and credited with the invention of the "feminist square", a part of the Friday Hirak protests held in front of Algiers 1 University.

== Creation ==
A declaration establishing the Femmes algériennes pour un changement vers l'égalité was signed on 16 March 2019 by Saadia Gacem and Faïka Medjahed, members of the Wasilla network, Fatma Boufenik, Habiba Djahnine and sixteen other women. The declaration called for full equality between female and male citizens, announced "the creation of a feminist square which will take place every Friday in front of the main entrance of Algiers 1 University (French: la faculté centrale d'Alger) starting from 13:00" and called for equal representation of women in any citizens' projects aimed to resolve the aims of the Hirak protests.

== Actions ==
=== Feminist square ===
FACE describes the feminist square as enabling women to group together in a way that overcomes ordinary practical difficulties in meeting up while remaining active in the Hirak protests. The feminist squares aim to be static for one hour and then to start moving with the main march.

The first feminist square (French: carré féministe) took place on Friday 22 March.

The second took place on 29 March 2019, starting with the placing of banners. The female participants were verbally and physically assaulted and their banners were torn by protestors who stated that "it's not the right time", that the women "were splitting the movement" and that equality is against Islam. Other protestors protected the feminist square women. Police asked the women to leave. According to Le Figaro, the attack "damaged the image of a protest movement known for its pacifism and openness, especially for women".

Amina Izarouken, a member of FACE responded to the demand to keep quiet by saying that "democracy will be made including women, with complete equality, or it won't be made".

The feminist square became a regular component of the Hirak demonstrations. In the 1 November 2019 Hirak demonstration, one of the largest, feminist square protestors carried portraits of former female fighters.

=== Creation of MNFA ===
On 13 October in Oran, FACE and thirteen other feminist associations and coalitions, including the Wasilla network, established the Mouvement national des féministes algériennes (National Movement of Algerian Feminists, MNFA), rejecting the Algerian Family Code "which enshrines permanent misogyny", opposing the 12 December third attempted presidential election "imposed by an antinational force detested by the people" and calling for the release of political prisoners.

== Appeals ==
On 16 December 2019, following the election of Abdelmadjid Tebboune in the 12 December third attempted presidential election, FACE and the feminist square declared that "Tebboune is not and never will be our president", denounced police repression, called for imprisoned protestors to be released and demanded that street protests, debates and political meetings of Hirak continue.
