= Amar Saadani =

Amar Saadani (Arabic: عمار سعداني; born April 17, 1950) is an Algerian politician. From 2004 to 2007, he was president of the People's National Assembly (APN), and then secretary general of the National Liberation Front (FLN) from September 1, 2013, to October 22, 2016. He was a close friend of late president Abdelaziz Bouteflika and his brother Saïd.

== Biography ==
Saadani studied political science.

A former union executive (UGTA), he was a deputy in the APN in 1997, and a member of the FLN central committee. He was, within the APN, President of the Commission of Transport, Transmissions and Telecommunications. Re-elected deputy in 2002, he held the position of vice-president of the Assembly before being elected, on June 23, 2004, as president of the APN.

He became the 11th secretary general of the National Liberation Front (FLN) following the controversial sixth session of its Central Committee in 2013 in Algiers.

On October 22, 2016, he resigned from the post of secretary general of the FLN, citing health reasons. On March 4, 2020, he announced his resignation from all FLN structures.

== Controversy ==
In 2008, Saadani was implicated in a scandal involving the embezzlement of an estimated $500 million USD (52 billion dinars) from the Générale des Concessions Agricoles (GCA) via its shell company Al Karama. He was summoned to appear before the investigating judge at the court of Djelfa on June 23, 2007, and was banned from leaving Algeria.

In 2019, he received public backlash for pointing out the historical legitimacy of Morocco's claim of the disputed Western Sahara.

Facing an arrest warrant and a potential prison sentence, Saadani chose to flee to France, which welcomed him when Algeria demanded his extradition. Following the promulgation of a Franco-Algerian extradition agreement, he chose to flee to Morocco, where he invested and sought political asylum.
