= Forces of the Democratic Alternative =

Coalition of political parties, associations and individuals

- Established: 26 June 2019 (7 years ago)
- Types: political alliance
- Aim: regime change
- Country: Algeria

The Forces of the Democratic Alternative (FDA, French: Forces de l'Alternative démocratique; Arabic: لقوى البديل الديمقراطي) or Forces of Pact of the Democratic Alternative (French: Forces du pacte de l'Alternative démocratique, FPAD; Arabic: العقد السياسي لقوى البديل الديمقراطي; Kabyle: Yiɣallen n ubeddel agdudan) is a wide alliance of political parties and citizens' groups in Algeria. It was created in mid 2019 during the 2019 Algerian protests, with the aim of organising a constituent assembly for a new political system with an independent judiciary and a transitionary period to democracy.

== Creation ==
The Forces of the Democratic Alternative alliance was created in a meeting in Algiers on 26 June 2019 during the 2019 Algerian protests, among several political parties and prominent individuals. On 27 August, the FDA was forced by Algerian authorities to cancel a meeting it had planned for 28 August. The authorities did not explain why the meeting was forbidden. A formal convention between the participants was signed at a national meeting soon after, on 9 September 2019.

== Members ==
As of its 9 September 2019 meeting, the FDA included the Socialist Forces Front (FFS), the Rally for Culture and Democracy (RCD), the Workers' Party (PT), the Socialist Workers Party (PST), the Union for Change and Progress (UPC), the Democratic and Social Movement (MDS), the Party for Secularism and Democracy (PLD) and the Algerian League for the Defense of Human Rights (LADDH).

== Aims ==
The FDA aims to organise a constituent assembly for a new political system in Algeria with an independent judiciary and a transitionary period to democracy. It opposes the 12 December presidential election. Its call for a boycott was joined by other groups, including the Party of Liberty and Justice led by Mohamed Saïd and by the Justice and Development Front (FJD) led by Abdallah Djaballah.

The Dynamiques de la société civile, a coalition of trade unions, citizens' groups and individuals created on 15 June 2019 during Hirak, stated that it would cooperate with the FDA and similar alliances.

== Actions ==
In early January 2020, the FDA proposed a "national democracy meeting" (French: assises nationales de la démocratie) on 25 January 2020 for all those wishing for a "democratic alternative". The meeting would aim to debate mechanisms and the nature of the political transition and of the procedures of a constituent assembly.

The meeting was held on 25 January as planned, apart from a change of venue because the signed agreement to use the Safex hall was "tacitly" cancelled by the authorities the day before the meeting, with 400 participants from diverse political parties and citizens' associations. The participants agreed on what they saw as the illegitimacy of the 12 December 2019 presidential election and the new president's method of proposing modifications to the Algerian constitution. The organisers promised to hold another meeting to decide on the mechanisms of a "democratic, autonomous" institutional transition, during which "illegitimate institutions" would be dissolved, and to plan the procedures of organising a sovereign constituent assembly.

== See also ==
- Dynamiques de la société civile - Algerian Hirak alliance
- Forces of Freedom and Change - wide, heterogeneous alliance of groups in the Sudanese Revolution
