= December 1960 protests in Algeria =

Algerian protests

On 11 December 1960, during the Algerian War, a popular uprising that involved mass demonstrations and violent disturbances took place in Algeria. The protests lasted for a period of 10 days after the visit of French president Charles de Gaulle. The uprising was the biggest political opposition challenge the French had faced in Algeria since the 1916 anti-French uprising. Protesters marched for 10 days despite threats of suppression and French attacks on protesters and civilians. Demonstrators waved their hands and chanted pro-freedom and independence slogans in the epicenter of the revolution, Algiers. Large-scale suppression of protesters occurred, and rallies and gatherings were banned as a result of the revolts. Protesters were gunned down and clashed with troops, and tanks were deployed to quell rioting. The uprising left hundreds dead. The protests would be known as the beginning of the independence of Algeria in 1962.

== See also ==
- Algerian War
