= Kherrata =

Kherrata Xeṛṛaṭa (Kabyle)
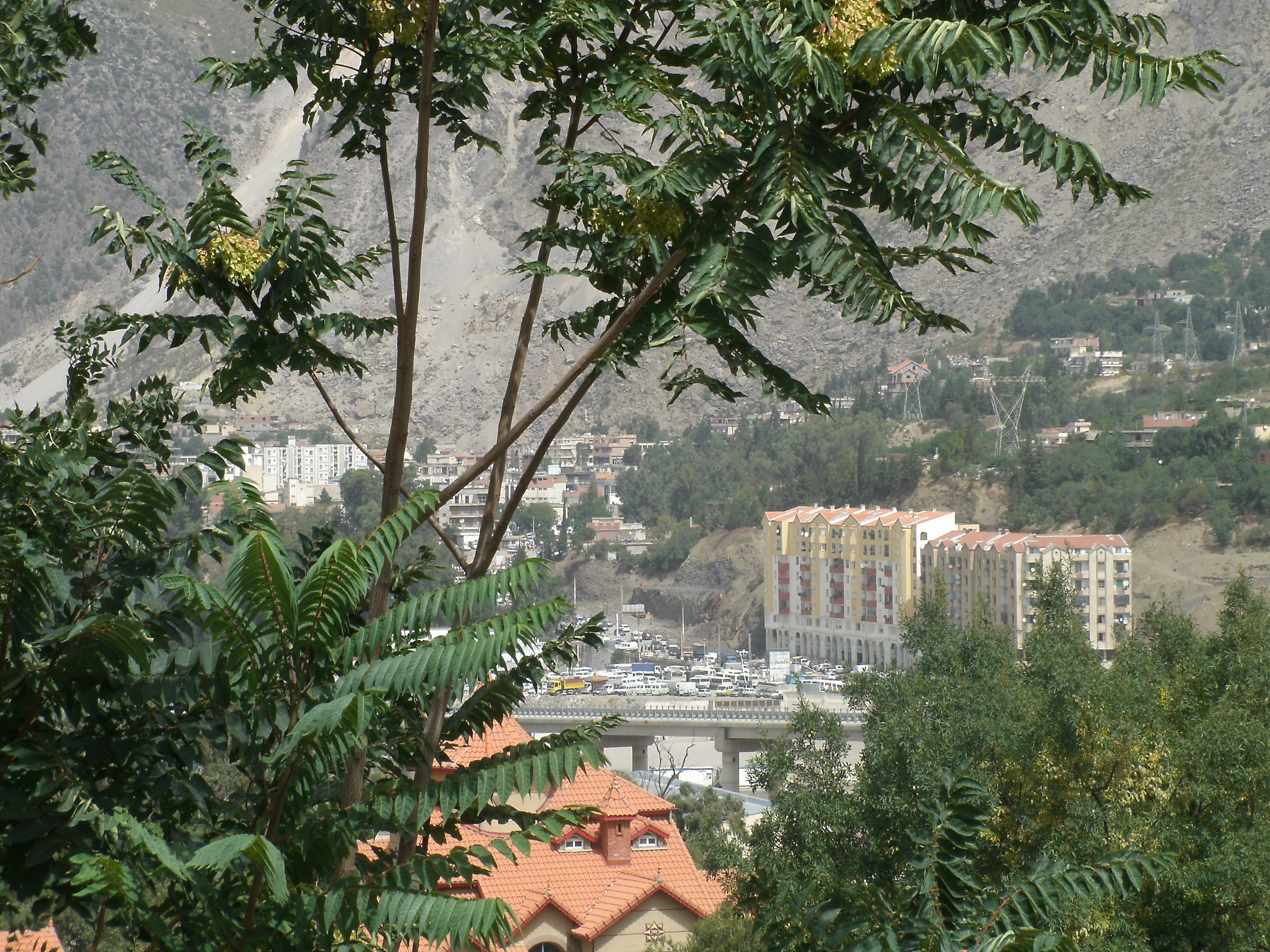

- Location within Algeria
- Coordinates: 36.492724°N 5.27759°E
- Country: Algeria
- Province: Bejaia

Population (2008)
  - Total: 35,077
- Time zone: UTC+1 (West Africa Time)

Kherrata (Kabyle: Xeṛṛaṭa) is a commune in northern Algeria in the Béjaïa Province.
