= Saïd Bouteflika =

Algerian politician (born 1958)

- سَعِيْد بُوتَفْلِيْقَة

Personal details
- Born: 1 January 1958 (age 68) Oujda, Morocco
- Relatives: Abdelaziz Bouteflika (brother)
- Education: National Polytechnic School (Algeria); Pierre and Marie Curie University

Saïd Bouteflika (Arabic: سَعِيْد بُوتَفْلِيْقَة, romanized: Saʿīd Būtaflīqa; Berber languages: ⵙⵄⵉⴷ ⴰⵠⵓⵜⴼⵉⵇⴰ; born 1 January 1958) is an Algerian politician and academic. He is the brother and was a special adviser of Abdelaziz Bouteflika in his former role as president of Algeria, on whom he would have had "considerable influence", especially after the president suffered a serious stroke in 2013. He was also an assistant professor at the University of Science and Technology Houari Boumediene (USTHB).

On 4 May 2019, a month after his brother's resignation, in the context of the protests in Algeria, he was arrested and provisionally imprisoned in the military prison of Blida awaiting trial. On 25 September 2019, he was sentenced to fifteen years in prison for “undermining the authority of the army” and “conspiring against the authority of the state”. He remains imprisoned for corruption in the Haddad and Louh cases, but also for the financing of the electoral campaign for his brother's fifth presidential term, a case for which he was sentenced to eight years in prison in June 2022.

== Biography ==
=== Early life ===
Saïd Bouteflika was born on 1 January 1958 in Oujda in Morocco, which was then the base of Wilaya V (the military district in the Oran region), at the start of the rise of his brother Abdelaziz, then aged twenty, with Houari Boumédiène, who at the same time was the head of the wilaya. He is the youngest of nine siblings.

His father Ahmed died when he was a year old, so he was brought up by his mother (who ran a hammam), under the tutelage of his brother Abdelaziz, and thereby by Houari Boumedienne who took power through a coup d'état in 1965. He was a student at the Saint-Joseph College of the Brothers of Christian Schools, in El-Biar (Algiers), then at the high school run by the Jesuits, like some sons of leaders, before the final closure of these establishments.

=== Exile and return ===
A graduate of the National Polytechnic School of Algiers, he arrived in Paris in 1983 to prepare a doctorate in computer science. His brother, ousted from Algeria after the death of Boumédiène, joined him, accused of embezzlement. Saïd Bouteflika holds a postgraduate doctorate from Pierre and Marie Curie University (Paris VI). His main center of interest is pattern recognition, a field in which he defended his thesis.

In 1987, the Bouteflikas were able to return to Algeria, and Saïd followed his brother back. He became a teacher and a university union activist. He married a biologist. In El Biar, he lived in a one floor house with his brother.

== Special advisor ==
After his brother Abdelaziz was elected president in 1999, he was appointed special adviser by an unpublished decree; he was officially in charge of the IT Department. In this role, he removed other members of the cabinet such as Ali Benflis and Larbi Belkheir; Saïd Bouteflika fired the former in 2003 and the latter in 2005. He managed his brother's re-election campaigns in 2004 and 2008, and began to be presented as a potential successor but failed to be named vice-president.

In 2005, Abdelaziz Bouteflika was hospitalized in Paris with an ulcer, which forced him to step back from his duties. As a result, Saïd's role grew. According to an inhabitant of El Mouradia interviewed by Jeune Afrique, “he keeps the agenda of the Head of State, intervenes in the appointments of ministers, diplomats, walis [lords], heads of public bodies, and influences the internal life of the FLN. Having become essential to gain access to the president, the special adviser takes de facto management of affairs in El-Mouradia."

In 2008, he helped his brother get re-elected, putting pressure on businessmen to finance the campaign, and made sure that public contracts were entrusted to relatives. An American cable from that year, released by Wikileaks, shows Bernard Bajolet indicating that "Corruption, which traces back to the brothers of Bouteflika [Saïd and Abdallah], has reached a new peak and is interfering with economic development". Shortly afterwards, several corruption scandals broke out, where his name was mentioned, perhaps at the instigation of the Département du Renseignement et de la Sécurité.

In 2013, Abdelaziz Bouteflika was hospitalized in Val-de-Grâce, in Paris. According to Jeune Afrique, Saïd Bouteflika remained alone at his brother's bedside, restricting access, and relaying instructions on his brother's condition to Prime Minister Abdelmalek Sellal, who had to wait 46 days before he could see the president. Le Matin even confirmed that Saïd Bouteflika himself signed seven decrees of appointment in place of his brother, and that he blocks the other appointments. At the same time, he intervened in the crisis shaking the FLN in order to impose a relative as secretary general, then in the subsequent cabinet reshuffle. Journalist and former DRS head Hichem Aboud, who revealed the seriousness of the president's condition, accused Saïd Bouteflika of "running the country by proxy", of having "been involved in many corruption cases" and for having persecuted him to silence him.

In October of the same year, rumors of succession between the brothers resumed, while the movements opposing him, the DRS and its leader, General Toufik, continued. This political war is manifested in particular by a new attack by Hichem Aboud who accused Saïd Bouteflika of massive corruption and drug trafficking, but also of homosexuality, which is illegal in Algeria.

Depleted and almost paralyzed, Abdelaziz Bouteflika finally ran for a fourth term in the Algerian presidential election in 2014 and won in the first round. Shortly after the election, while his brother was still barely visible, rumors of Saïd's desire to succeed him once again emerged. In November, one of his key backers, the businessman Ali Haddad, became the only candidate for the head of the Forum of business leaders.

In September 2015, President Bouteflika put an end to General Toufik's reign, a dismissal seen as underlining the fact that the real power lay in the hands of Saïd Bouteflika.

According to journalist Frédéric Pons, Saïd Bouteflika was preparing the succession of his brother by approaching the moderate Islamists with whom he seeks to give a broad popular base to the new team which will take over the country.

On 3 June 2017, Saïd Bouteflika surprised many by coming out and supporting the demonstrators who protested against the treatment given to Rachid Boudjedra by the Ennahar TV Channel. He was booed and kicked out of the demonstration.

According to Le Matin d'Algérie, in the summer of 2017, Saïd Bouteflika was in the best position to succeed his brother in 2019, but such an event would have sparked an uprising. The name of former minister Chakib Khelil was also thrown around.

== Protests and arrest ==
=== Events of March 2019 ===
On 27 March, in the context of Hirak, Saïd Bouteflika, Athmane Tartag, Mohamed Mediène, and Louisa Hanoune met in a military residence to decide whether to dismiss the head of the army, Ahmed Gaïd Salah, and the maintenance of Bouteflika in exchange for the appointment of a new prime minister responsible for implementing the transition promised in mid-March. After having hesitated on the name of the prime minister, they chose former President Liamine Zéroual, who declined after accepting, citing health reasons and the refusal of the plan by the demonstrators.

=== In custody ===
On the evening of 2 April 2019, after the resignation of his brother after being under pressure from the streets and the army, Saïd Bouteflika was reportedly placed under house arrest. On 4 May, he was arrested along with Athmane Tartag and Mohamed Mediène.

Although forced to wear a prisoner's uniform, Saïd Bouteflika nevertheless had better conditions of detention than other people imprisoned at El-Harrach Prison, who only had the right to read newspapers.

The trial took place on 23 September. Saïd Bouteflika was tried along with the other defendants Louisa Hanoune, the secretary general of the Workers' Party, Mohamed Mediène, the former head of the DRS, and Athmane Tartag, the former coordinator of security services.

=== Trial ===
During the trial, Saïd Bouteflika rejected the jurisdiction of the military court to try him and refused to answer the judge's questions. He then asked to leave the room and the judge authorized him to do so.

On the second day of the trial, the public prosecutor of the military court of Blida requested a 20-year prison sentence against all the accused. On the third day, the judge brought down a 15-year prison sentence.

On 26 September 2019, he appealed against the verdict. The appeal trial of Saïd Bouteflika, Athmane Tartag, Mohamed Mediène and Louisa Hanoune was held in front of the military appeals court of Blida on 9 February 2020. His 15-year prison sentence was upheld.

== Investigation and detention ==
In December 2020, an Algerian judge ordered placing Bouteflika into pre-trial detention as part of an investigation involving former Algerian Justice Minister, Tayeb Louh. Bouteflika faced charges of attempting to manipulate the national justice system by influencing judges working on cases related to his business connections.

On 3 January 2021, Bouteflika was transferred from the Military Establishment for Prevention and Rehabilitation of Blida to El Harrach Prison.

In October 2021, Saïd Bouteflika was sentenced to two years in prison for "obstructing the proper conduct of justice".

In October 2022, the Algiers Court of Appeal upheld the first instance judgment sentencing Saïd Boudeflika to eight years in prison, while lifting the seizure of his property. The Defense of Saïd Boudeflika announces an appeal in cassation.
