= 2000s in Algeria =

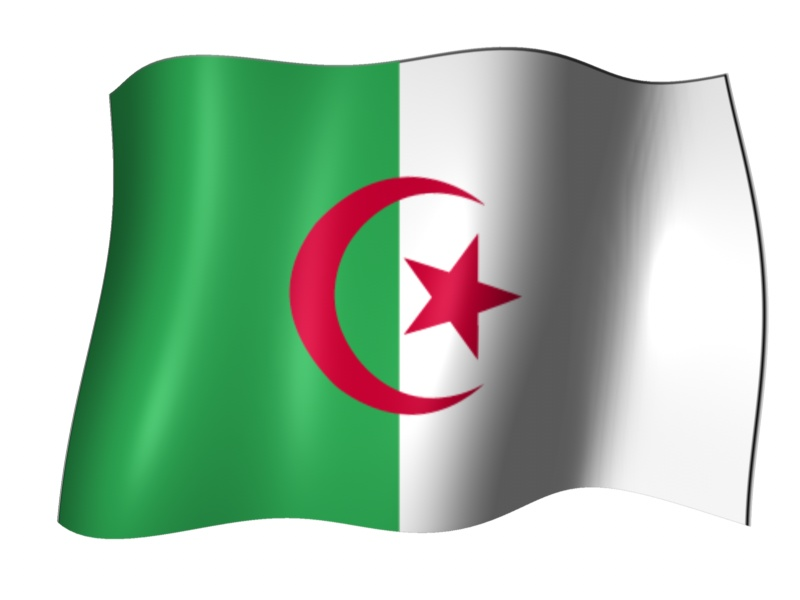
The Algerian Flag

The 2000s in Algeria emerged from the 'Black Decade' of the 1990s. The 'Black Decade' was characterised by a civil war beginning in 1991 and ending at the beginning of the following decade in 2002. President Abdelaziz Bouteflika, who is accredited with ending the civil war, continued to be in power throughout the 2000s following his election in 1999. Despite being in power for 20 years and being Algeria's longest running president, Bouteflika's politics have been widely opposed and contested, with accusations from the BBC “of widespread corruption and state repression”. In April 2019 Bouteflika officially resigned from his position as president after months of public protest and loss of the army's support. The 82 Year old President was widely considered unfit for the role after experiencing a stroke in 2013. His resignation was reported by the BBC to have been met with "huge celebrations".

In the post civil war period of the 2000s ‘Al-Qaeda in the Islamic Maghreb’ (‘AQIM’), an Algerian Islamic extremist group, rose to prominence and was responsible for a number of acts of terrorism in Algeria and the Northern African region. This was relevant in relation to world politics at the time as it tied in with the USA's ‘War on Terror’, and lead to cooperation between the two nations in global counterterrorism attempts.

The 2000s in Algeria was also impacted by the 2001 'Black Spring’, an uprising by members of the Kabyle ethnic group, as well as the 2001 Algerian floods which destroyed infrastructure, displaced families and resulted in a significant death toll.

== End of the Civil War ==
The civil war officially ended when peace was established in 2002. This came after the presidential elections of April 1999 and the controversial election of Abdelaziz Bouteflika who according to Journalist Ramy Allahoum “spent his first years as president trying to end the civil war”. Bouteflika successfully achieved this in the first half of the decade by offering an official amnesty to the Islamic Guerrilla fighters who had fought in opposition to the government during the war. This amnesty was offered only to those who had been accused of non-violent crimes, and did not include those who had engaged in crimes such as rape, murder or bombing.

=== Legislation ===
The 'Civil Concord' law was adopted by nationwide referendum in September 1999 as a means of ending the war and establishing the proposed amnesty for 'Islamic Salvation Front' ('FIS') fighters. Although highly favoured by voters, at the time the law's effectiveness was criticised by certain non-government organisations. The ICG stated the policy had "failed" in their 2001 report 'The Civil Concord: a peace initiative wasted'. A later report published in 2008, after the civil war had ended, by the Library of Congress: Federal Research Division states that "The reconciliation by no means ended all violence, but it reduced violence to manageable levels".

In 2005 the ‘Charter for Peace and National Reconciliation’ further enforced the amnesty agreement for "all but the most violent participants in the Islamist Uprising" and was again voted highly in favour of by the Algerian public. This legislative action further stabilised and significantly reduced violence in the country after official termination of the war in 2002.

Some felt that despite the tactical success of these laws, they failed to recognise the losses experienced by many Algerians during the war, and did not provide adequate punishment or retribution to those responsible for the violence.

== Post Civil War Period ==
=== Presidential controversy ===
President Bouteflika remained president for the entirety of the 2000s decade, after being re-elected to serve another five-year term in 2004 and 2009. The political system of the country during this period shifted to a slightly more democratic style government under Bouteflika's leadership, as opposed to the strictly "military rule" of the civil war period.

However, controversy has surrounded the election and reelection of President Bouteflika over the decade. His 1999 election was the subject of much criticism after just one day prior to the election all six of the other candidates pulled out with accusations of military fraud. According to a report from The Guardian "The United States called the polls a lost opportunity for progress towards democracy".

In 2004 Bouteflika's reelection was considered more legitimate yet still not completely transparent, as stated by Carol Migdalovitz in her CRS Report for Congress, there was "some manipulation of the political process but without blatant fraud".

Bouteflika's 2009 reelection was too considered an illegitimate win with Carnegie Middle East Centre reporting that he "used money to buy support" and that the 90.2% vote was "far too high to be credible".

Bouteflika went on to be reelected once more in 2014 following the end of the 2000s decade and has, despite controversy, been praised by many for his genuine success in bringing about an end to the war, restoring stability to the country, and expanding foreign and economic policy.

=== Politics and Terrorism ===
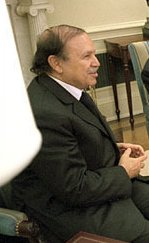
President Abdelaziz Bouteflika visit to the white house, 2001

Despite the reduction in violence from the civil war, terrorism rose in prominence during the 2000s period, both nationally and globally. The Algerian Islamic extremist group ‘Al-Qaeda in the Islamic Maghreb’ (‘AQIM’) emerged from the Islamic Guerrilla forces which fought in opposition to the government during the Algerian civil war. In 2003 the group formerly known as ‘Armed Islamic Group’ (‘GIA’) gained international recognition as being part of the Al-Qaeda group, and officially identified itself as ‘AQIM’ in 2007. The group was responsible for a number of violent terrorist acts in Algeria and Northern Africa which mostly targeted westerners as victims. ‘AQIM’, like other global terrorist groups in the 2000s, utilised new technology and the internet in order to gain influence and carry out their attacks.

Extremist Islamic terrorism in Algeria during this period was particularly relevant to the global politics of the decade, which was heavily influenced by the 2001 9/11 terrorist attacks and American President George Bush's ‘War on Terror’. Algeria and the USA cooperated in counterterrorism efforts during the 2000s and according to Professor Mhand Berkouk “Several countries became interested in the Algerian experience and the expertise the country had gained in counterterrorism operations”. Bouteflika made two visits to the White House in 2001 following the September attacks, once in July and once in November.

Bouteflika has been accredited by Carnegie Middle East Centre with "Reinvigorating the country's foreign policy", both through cooperation with the United States and its growing role in Africa. During the 2000s Algeria gained increasing involvement and influence in the Organisation of African Unity (OAU), as well as contributing to the establishment of a partnership between the African Union Development Agency (AUDA-NEPAD) and the Council of Scientific and Industrial Research (CSIR) in an attempt to develop the continent's economy.

=== Economy ===
Along with bringing an end to the war and reducing violence, Bouteflika's "primary task was to rebuild the country and its economy" according to the BBC. By 2004, at the time of his second election, the president had reduced debt and economic growth was at its "highest since the 1980's", according to The New York Times.

Unemployment continued to be a major issue throughout the decade, particularly among young people. The New York Times reported the countries unemployment level was at 25% in 2003. By 2009 unemployment was recorded at 75% of people under the age of 30 by Carnegie, Middle East Centre.

== Uprising of minorities ==
=== 2001 Black Spring ===
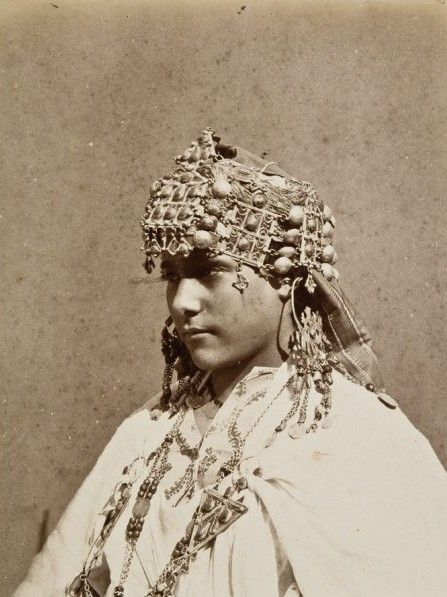
Kabyle woman

In early 2001 riots broke out in the Kayblia region of Algeria as the native Berber people of the area fought to gain increased recognition of their traditional language and culture. The riots, known as the ‘Black Spring’, lasted up to 10 days and where responsible for between 40 and 80 deaths, with some controversy surrounding the validity of the recorded death toll. The catalyst for the riots was the death of a young Berber person who was shot while being held in custody by the national rural police, the Gendarmerie Nationale, in April 2001. This event caused particular outrage amongst the Berber community as it came during preparations for the 21st anniversary of the 1980 ‘Berber Spring’ uprising.

As a result, strikes and demonstrations have gained popularity and frequency in the Kayblia, especially amongst the youth of the region. Primary concerns of the protesters where the recognition of the Thamazighth language, restitution for the deaths of Kabylia people, removal of armed forces and autonomy for the Kabylia region.

The 2001 ‘Black Spring’ has been referred to as one of the “deadliest events in the movements history” by Journalist Yasmina Allouche, as it spurred over 4 years of political unrest in the country lasting until early 2006. In the wake of the riots, Algeria experienced its largest demonstration in history, with more than 1 million protestors meeting on the 11 June 2001.

The ‘Black Spring’ was a turning point in the ongoing history of the movement and left a legacy of political support for the Berber minority, such as formation of the transnational ‘Citizens Movement’. On the 10th of April 2002 the Berber language Tamazight was officially recognised and constitutionalised as a national language.

== 2001 Floods ==
In November 2001 Algeria was struck by “its worst flooding in years” as described by journalist Abdelmalek Touati. The floods affected the Northern region of Algeria, where precipitation levels are highest in the country.

It was recorded by the UN Office for Coordination of Humanitarian Affairs (OCHA) that up to 751 people where killed, and up to 10, 000 families where effected by the ‘devastating’ flooding. The effected area was submerged in mud, leaving significant damage to roads, houses, schools and businesses, however ‘no danger of water-borne diseases’ was reported according to the OCHA.

In the wake of this damage, Algeria was supported in its clean up and recovery by a number of nations, such as Sweden, France and Qatar. UNICEF and UNDP also contributed equivalent to US$3 million to the country in order to provide assistance.

However, the National Algerian government was criticised by its people for its delayed response and lack of preparation for the natural disaster. Overall the country was left deeply effected by the 2001 floods. It was recorded in 2005 that ‘Approximately half the Algerian population lives below the poverty line’ and that the country ‘ranked 104 out of 177 countries in...overall well-being’ according to the United Nations’ human development index.
