= Ali Benflis =

Algerian politician (born 1944)

- علي بن فليس
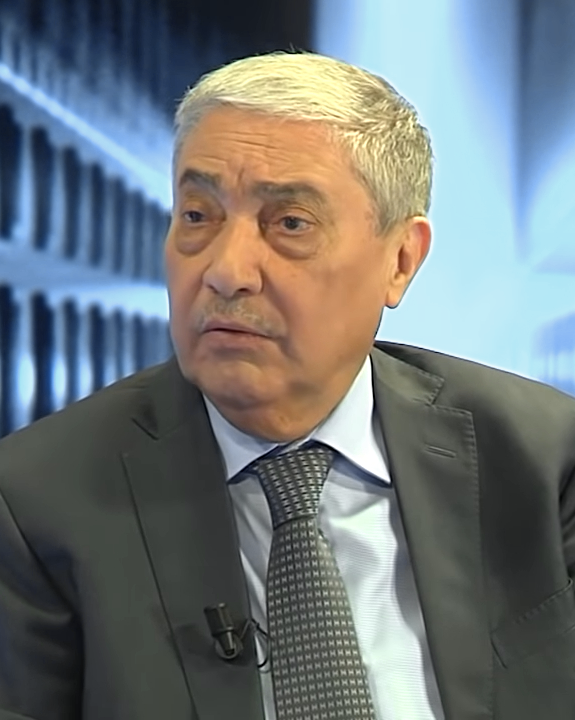
- Benflis in 2019

13th Prime Minister of Algeria
- In office 26 August 2000 – 13 August 2004
- President: Abdelaziz Bouteflika
- Preceded by: Ahmed Benbitour
- Succeeded by: Ahmed Ouyahia

Personal details
- Born: 8 September 1944 (age 81) Batna, Algeria
- Political party: National Liberation Front (until 2004)

Ali Benflis (Arabic: على بن فليس; born 8 September 1944) is an Algerian politician who was Head of Government of Algeria from 2000 to 2004. In 2003, he became the general secretary of the National Liberation Front party. Benflis was a candidate in the 2004 presidential election, but the poll resulted in the re-election of Abdelaziz Bouteflika. Benflis ran yet again as an independent candidate in the 2014 Algerian presidential elections held on 17 April 2014. The result was that Abdelaziz Bouteflika was reelected as president with 81.53% of the votes, with Benflis ending as runner-up with 12.18%.

== Early life ==
Benflis was born on 8 September 1944 in Batna, which is the fifth largest city in Algeria. He is of Chaoui Berber origin. When he was 13 years old, Benflis lost his father and older brother during the Algerian War. Benflis went to primary school in Batna, before earning his high school diploma from Hihi El Mekki High School in Constantine.

== Political career ==
Benflis successively held the positions of General Secretary at the office of the Algerian President, as well as Chief of Staff at the Presidential Cabinet. After that, he was appointed Head of the Government and Secretary-General of the FLN Party, and it was during this post when he ran for president in the 8 April 2004 election. The results of that election were largely seen as distorted by fraud.

Ali Benflis is a veteran human rights activist. He is a founding member of the Algerian Human Rights League, which was set up on 11 November 1987 by the Minister of the Interior El Hadi Khediri and Major-General Larbi Belkheir, with the aim of counteracting the Ligue algérienne pour la défense des droits de l'homme. This organization states that it aims to defend and promote human rights in Algeria, as well as educate citizens about democracy and good governance. Benflis was a member of the executive committee of the Algerian Human Rights League, as well as a delegate for the country's eastern area. His mandate ended on 9 November 1998.

He obtained his law degree in 1968 from The Faculty of Law and Economic Sciences University in Algeria. He became a magistrate and was appointed judge at the Court of Blida in October 1968. It was shortly after this appointment, that he was posted in the central administration of the Ministry of Justice, where he became a sub-director of juvenile delinquency until the end of 1969. After that, he was appointed prosecutor at the Court of Batna until 1971. From 1971 – 1974 Benflis was acting General-Attorney at the Court of Constantine. It was during this time that he decided to cement his place in legal work, and join the bar.

In 1974, he quickly proved to be one of the most influential lawyers of his generation. So much so, that his peers elected him President of the Lawyers for the Batna area from 1983 – 1985. He was also elected as a member of the executive committee of the National Council of Lawyers during the same period. In 1987, Benflis’ stature catapulted him to the position of President of the Bar for Batna. These influential posts were what led Ali Benflis to be appointed Minister of Justice in Algeria, in November 1988.

As minister of Justice (1988 – 1991), the justice system witnessed its deepest and most daring reforms. One such measure was known as the Status of the Judicial Authorities, which established, for the first time, the independence of the judiciary. Several other laws were passed under Benflis: The law governing the lawyers’ profession which reinforced the rights of the defence, the laws related to the professions of notaries and bailiffs as well as texts relating to the clerk's office. He initiated the adoption of texts consolidating freedom and human rights such as the abolition of the banishment sentence and the elimination of the State Security Court. He improved the prison conditions.

Minister of Justice in three different governments, he will be remembered as the one who required from the authorities that certain judiciary guarantees be respected, such as the right of recourse and the right to a defending counsel for the people subjected to a measure of internment without trial taken in application of the 1991 decree instituting the Emergency State. He will also be remembered because he resigned from the government when his request was not taken into account.

=== Prime Minister (2000-2004) ===
Ali Benflis was appointed Prime Minister of Algeria in August 2000. His mandate was renewed in June 2002. During this time, he implemented a new style of governance based on dialogue and consultation. His judicial expertise and open-mindedness allowed him to be able to defuse many social conflicts. He obtained support from his social and economic partners for his legislative initiatives on economic and social reforms. Ali Benflis left the post of prime minister on 13 August 2004.

Al Monitor claimed that the Benflis prime ministership was "marked by high-profile scandals".

Benflis' political career was prompted by his election to the Central Committee and the Political Bureau of the FLN in December 1989. He was successively re-elected in 1991, 1996, 1998 and 2000. His political career was further catapulted in September 2001, when he was elected the General-Secretary of the party, and then re-elected on 14 October 2003 during the party's 8th Congress.

Black Spring

According to Al Monitor, "many voters" were "turned off" Benflis because of the killing by authorities of 126 (or 127) protesters during the Black Spring that took place in 2001 during his prime ministership. The Black Spring consisted of protests in Kabylie in favour of Berber cultural rights.

=== 2004 presidential election ===
Benflis was a main candidate in opposition to Abdelaziz Bouteflika during the 2004 Algerian presidential election, but came a distant second as Bouteflika won with 85.0% of the vote against just 6.4% for Benflis. The turnout was 58.1%.

Candidate	Party	Votes	%
Abdelaziz Bouteflika	National Rally for Democracy	8,651,723	85.0
Ali Benflis	National Liberation Front	653,951	6.4
Abdallah Djaballah	Movement for National Reform	511,526	5.0
Said Sadi	Rally for Culture and Democracy	197,111	1.9
Louisa Hanoune	Workers' Party	101,630	1.0
Ali Fawzi Rebaine	Ahd 54	63,761	0.6
Invalid/blank votes		329,075	–
Total		10,508,777	100
Registered voters/turnout		18,097,255	58.1
Source: IFES

Four months after the results of the 8 April 2004 presidential election were announced, Benflis retired his mandate as Secretary-General of the FLN Party on 19 August 2004. He denounced the election results, which were seen by many as marred by fraud. But Ali Benflis made it very clear that just because he was giving up his post, did not mean he was leaving the political scene. He insists he remains loyal to his ideas.

Benflis did not present his candidacy during the 2009 presidential election again won by Bouteflika by 90.24% of the vote.

=== 2014 presidential election ===
On 19 January 2014, Benflis announced his intention to stand as a candidate in the 2014 presidential election. Candidate website.

Algerian Interior Minister Taieb Belaiz announced on 18 April that Bouteflika had won 81.53% of the vote, while Benflis was second placed with 12.18%. The turnout was 51.7%, down from the 75% turnout in 2009.

Candidate	Party	Votes	%
Abdelaziz Bouteflika	National Liberation Front	8,332,598	81.53
Ali Benflis	Independent	1,244,918	12.18
Abdelaziz Belaid	Front for the Future	343,624	3.36
Louisa Hanoune	Workers' Party	140,253	1.37
Ali Fawzi Rebaine	Ahd 54	101,046	0.99
Moussa Touati	Algerian National Front	57,590	0.56
Invalid/blank votes		1,087,449	–
Total		11,307,478	100
Registered voters/turnout		21,871,393	51.70
Source: Interior Ministry

After the polls closed, Benflis criticised the election as having been marked by "fraud on a massive scale." The turnout figures were also criticised for allegedly being inflated.

=== 2019 presidential election ===
Ali Benflis is a candidate in the third attempted date for organising the 2019 Algerian presidential election, on 12 December 2019. Al Jazeera English described Benflis and the other four candidates as "all part of the political establishment".

== Marriage, family, and personal life ==
Ali Benflis is married, and is the father of four children.

Political offices
Preceded by Ahmed Benbitour	Head of Government of Algeria; 2000–2004	Succeeded by Ahmed Ouyahia
