= Soufiane Djilali =

Algerian political leader

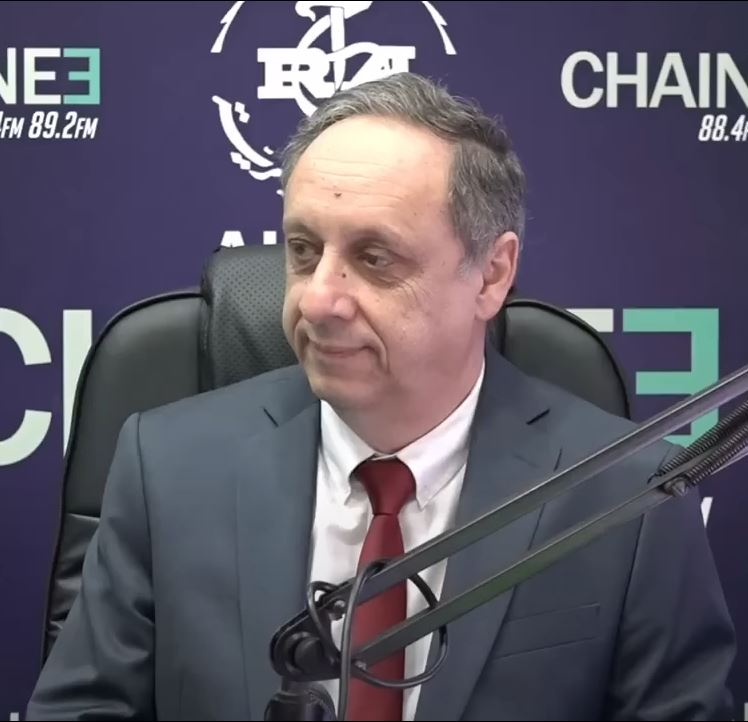
- Soufiane Djilali

President of Jil Jadid
- In office February 25, 2017 – September 24, 2025
- Preceded by: Office established
- Succeeded by: Lakhdar Amokrane

Personal details
- Born: September 16, 1958 (age 67) Blida, Algeria
- Party: Jil Jadid (since 2012)
- Other political affiliations: Party of Algerian Renewal (1989–1999)

Soufiane Djilali (born 16 September 1958) is an Algerian politician. He is the founder and the former-President of Jil Jadid.

== Early life and education ==
Djilali was born on September 16, 1958, in Blida, Blida Province, Algeria. At a young age, he and his family emigrated to Algiers where he completed his education, obtaining a doctorate in veterinary medicine. He later moved to France and continued his studies at Paris VI University, earning a master's degree, a postgraduate diploma, and a State doctorate in immunology.

== Political career ==
He became involved in politics by joining the Party of Algerian Renewal in 1989. However, In May 1999, Following a disagreement with Nourddine Boukrouh, the president of the PRA, he resigned from the party along with a dozen executives, in order not to support the rapprochement with President Abdelaziz Bouteflika.

In 2001, he founded the El Badil party, However the Ministry of the Interior refused to grant the necessary permits to organize the Congress.

In 2004, Soufiane Djilali became a member of the campaign management team for National Liberation Front (FLN) candidate, Ali Benflis in the 2004 Algerian presidential elections.

=== Mouwatana movement ===
Mouwatana was an Algerian political movement created on June 6, 2018, by members of the opposition against Abdelaziz Bouteflika's fifth term. The movement was led by Soufiane Djilali, Amira Bouraoui, and Zoubida Assoul.

=== Jil Jadid ===
During the period of political reform debates influenced by Arab Spring, Djilali started a new party called Jil Jadid on 11 March 2011. The party was later officially recognized by the Algerian government in 2012. Soufiane Djilali became the founding chairman of the Jil Jadid.

In 2025, he resigned from the position of chairman and was succeeded by Lakhdar Amokrane.

== Books ==
- La société algérienne: Choc de la modernité, crise des valeurs et des croyances, 2017

== See also ==
- Jil Jadid
