= Ennahar TV =

Algerian 24-hour television news channel

- Ennahar TV logo
- Country: Algeria
- Broadcast area: Worldwide
- Headquarters: Saïd Hamdine, Bir Mourad Rais; Algiers

Programming
- Languages: Arabic; French; Berber
- Picture format: 576i (16:9 SDTV)

Ownership
- Owner: Ennahar Group

History
- Launched: 6 March 2012; 13 years ago

Links
- Website: tv.ennaharonline.com

Availability

Streaming media
- Ennahar Online: Watch live

Ennahar TV (Arabic: تلفزيون النهار) is an Arabic satellite television channel broadcasting from Bir Mourad Rais. Ennahar TV was set up by Ennahar Group and a number of Arab intellectuals from Algeria and the rest of the Arab world.

== History ==
Ennahar TV started broadcasting in test mode on 6 March 2012 using Nilesat from Amman. It opened its programming by broadcasting TV news by the duo of Riyadh Benamar and Nour El Yakin Meghriche.

In April 2013, the Ministry of Communication confirmed the approval of Ennahar TV, along with Echourouk TV and El Djazairia. This administrative authorization was provisional and only valid until 31 December 2013.

On 5 July 2013, Ennahar Documentaries, a sister channel of Ennahar TV, was launched on Nilesat to broadcast reports and documentaries from the Ennahar TV catalogue continuously. It was cancelled a few days after its launch.

In 2014, the channel was criticised for a report on university residences for girls in Algeria. The channel has been often accused of sensationalism.

On 28 November 2014, Zahra DZ was launched. Now known as Ennahar Laki, it is an Ennahar group channel dedicated to women in Algeria. It broadcasts soap operas in Arabic or dubbed in Arabic from Turkish.

In April 2015, the president of the Audiovisual Regulatory Authority (ARAV), Miloud Chorfi, held a series of meetings with various Ennahar TV stakeholders. This included a meeting with Anis Rahmani, the general manager of Ennahar group.

On 2 June 2015, at the ninth edition of the Media Star, (Note: Digital Star is an annual ceremony hosted by Ooredoo Algeria which recognizes the best journalistic traveaux and honors professionals in the media field.) Ibtissam Bouslama, won second prize in the audiovisual production category. This was for their report, Cybercrime, which was broadcast by the channel.

In December 2015, Ennahar TV was criticised by ARAV for broadcasting a report that presented the general secretary of the Workers' Party, Louisa Hanoune, as a woman who "encourages corruption." Miloud Chorfi, the director of ARAV, summoned the head editor for an official warning.

On 24 January 2016, Ennahar TV displayed a black screen throughout the morning until 11 o'clock. According to a news article published on its website, there was a technical failure due to a cutting of a fiber optic cable in Egypt at 6:50, which also affected several other channels.

On 6 March 2016, the headquarters of Ennahar TV Algiers was renamed in the name of the deceased mujahid Moukkadem Ben Slimane. The renaming was accompanied by a ceremony attended by the widow of the mujahid, the Minister of Mujahideen, Tayeb Zitoun; and the President of the National Front for Social Justice, Khaled Bounedjma.

== Programming ==
=== News bulletins ===
- 90 Minutes News (90 دقيقة أخبار)

=== Current affairs ===
- Business Guest (ضيف الاقتصاد)

=== Other shows ===
- Zapping YouTube

== On air staff ==
- Haroun Nemoul
