= 2005 Algerian national reconciliation referendum =

- 29 September 2005
- Do you agree with the draft Charter for Peace and National Reconciliation that has been proposed to you?

Results
Choice	Votes	%
Yes	14,057,371	97.38%
No	377,748	2.62%
Valid votes	14,435,119	98.83%
Invalid or blank votes	171,231	1.17%
Total votes	14,606,350	100.00%
Registered voters/turnout	18,313,594	79.76%

A national reconciliation referendum was held in Algeria on 29 September 2005. The referendum was held to vote on adopting the Charter for Peace and National Reconciliation which had been drawn up to try to bring closure to the Algerian Civil War. The official results showed an overwhelming vote in favour amid a high turnout.

== Background ==
The Algerian Civil War, which had begun in 1991 after the military cancelled the 1991 National Assembly elections to prevent Islamists from winning, had led to at least 150,000 people dying by 2005. Since the late 1990s violence had been declining and the government of President Abdelaziz Bouteflika began drawing up plans for an amnesty for both members of the military and Islamists.

The Charter for Peace and National Reconciliation that was produced would offer an amnesty to anyone who had taken part in the civil war unless they had taken part in rapes, mass murders or public bombings. The charter removed any blame to the state for the events of the civil war and prevented any leaders of the Islamist rebels from re-entering politics in Algeria. It also provided for compensation to be given to the families of the dead and those who disappeared during the civil war.

== Referendum question ==
The question voted on in the referendum was:

Are you for or against the Charter for Peace and National Reconciliation project that the government has proposed?

== Campaign ==
President Bouteflika personally led the campaign in favour of the charter and for several weeks before the referendum he travelled across Algeria to campaign for a yes vote. The government said that there was no alternative to the charter and used the slogan "From concord to national reconciliation. For Algeria". Public enthusiasm for the charter was not much evident during the campaign but there was support as people saw the referendum as a chance to bring the long conflict to a conclusion.

Opponents, including some opposition parties, said that the charter would prevent people from obtaining justice as it would not hold those who committed crimes accountable for them. There was a call for a boycott and opponents described it as just giving more legitimacy to the government and president. However no opposition groups were allowed to get their point of view on national television or radio stations during the campaign.

On the day of the referendum there was violence in the eastern regions of Algeria and particularly Kabylie province where turnout was much lower than in the rest of the country. Turnout varied widely with Tizi Ouzou Province seeing a turnout of only a little over 11%, while in Khenchela official figures showed a 99.95% turnout.

== Results ==
The government described the official results as having given "real backing for the president's project". However critics, such as human rights groups, said that the official turnout figures were completely overstated, with polling stations in and around Algiers seeing little evidence of a large turnout.

Choice	Votes	%
For	14,054,164	97.36
Against	381,127	2.64
Total	14,435,291	100.00
Valid votes	14,435,291	98.83
Invalid/blank votes	171,507	1.17
Total votes	14,606,798	100.00
Registered voters/turnout	18,313,594	79.76
Source: IFES Election Guide
