= Jil Jadid =

Algerian political party

New Generation جيل جديد
- Leader: Lakhdar Amokrane
- Founder: Soufiane Djilali
- Founded: 11 March 2011
- Headquarters: Algeria
- Ideology: Liberal conservatism; Reformism
- Political position: Centre-right
- People's National Assembly: 3 / 407

Website
- jiljadid.org

Jil Jadid (Arabic: جيل جديد, lit. 'New Generation') is an Algerian political party. It was established in 2011 by Soufiane Djilali. It advocates democratic governance, civil liberties, and economic reform in Algeria. It also promotes economic reforms in the country and the diversification of the economy away from hydrocarbons.

== Ideology ==
Jil Jadid claims to be a reformist and modernist party that promotes democratic governance in Algeria. It claims to support the rule of law and the empowerment of the youth in the country. It also promotes the fight against corruption in Algeria. It also promotes economic modernization in the country and the diversification of the economy away from hydrocarbons. It has been referred to promotes political reforms in the country and the engagement of the youth in the process.

== History ==
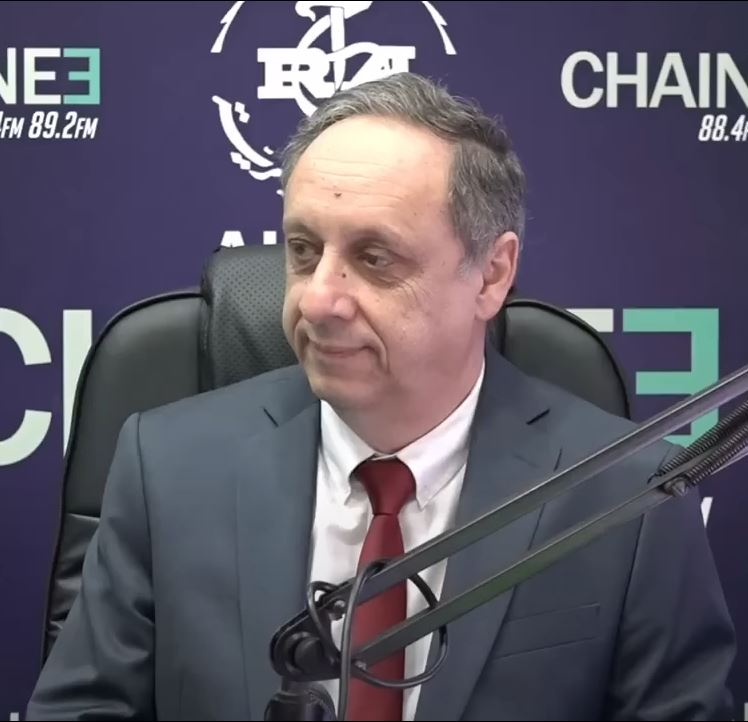
Soufiane Djilali

Jil Jadid was created on 11 March 2011 by Soufiane Djilali, during a period of political reform debates influenced by the Arab Spring. The party was later officially recognized by the Algerian government in 2012. Soufiane Djilali became the first chairman of the Jil Jadid.

In the 2014 presidential election , Jil Jadid party contested the elections with party president Soufiane Djilali as candidate.

In 2025, Lakhdar Amokrane succeeded Soufiane Djilali and was elected president of Jil Jadid.

== Electoral history ==
=== 2012 legislative elections ===
In 2012, just after the legalization of the party, Jil Jadid contested the 2012 legislative elections. Although the party fielded candidates, none of them won a seat in the People’s National Assembly.

=== 2017 legislative elections ===
In 2017, the party boycotted the 2017 parliamentary elections, citing the lack of transparency in the voting process.

=== 2021 legislative elections ===
In 2021, Jil Jadid returned to electoral politics in the 2021 Algerian legislative elections. This time, the party won one seat in the People’s National Assembly.

Jil Jadid returned to electoral participation in the 2021 Algerian legislative elections. The party won 1 seat in the People’s National Assembly, which marked its first parliamentary representation.
