= Smail Hamdani =

Prime Minister of Algeria from 1998 to 1999

- اسماعيل حمداني

Prime Minister of Algeria
- In office 15 December 1998 – 23 December 1999
- President: Liamine Zeroual; Abdelaziz Bouteflika
- Preceded by: Ahmed Ouyahia
- Succeeded by: Ahmed Benbitour

Personal details
- Born: 11 March 1930 Guenzet, Algeria
- Died: 6/7 February 2017 (aged 86) Djasr Kasentina, Algeria

Smail Hamdani (Arabic: اسماعيل حمداني; 11 March 1930 – 6/7 February 2017) was an Algerian politician. He was Prime Minister of Algeria from 15 December 1998 to 23 December 1999.

== Early life and education ==
Hamdani was born in Guenzet, Bordj Bou Arréridj Province in eastern Algeria, on 11 March 1930.

== Political career ==
Hamdani became a member of the National Liberation Front (FLN). In 1962 when Algeria gained its independence, he was named as chief of staff of the provisional government led by Abderrahmane Farès. Under the presidency of Ahmed Ben Bella, Hamdani was appointed ambassador to Belgium. Then he served as information officer and the director of legal and consular affairs at the Ministry of Foreign Affairs until 1970.

He was Prime Minister from 15 December 1998 to 23 December 1999.

== Death ==
Hamdani died in his sleep on the night of 6 February or the morning of 7 February 2017 at the age of 86.

== See also ==
- List of ambassadors to Belgium
- List of ambassadors to France

Political offices
Preceded by Ahmed Ouyahia	Prime Minister of Algeria; 1998–1999	Succeeded by Ahmed Benbitour
