= President of Algeria =

Head of state and chief executive

President of the People's Democratic Republic of Algeria
- رئيس الجمهورية الجزائرية الديمقراطية الشعبية (Arabic)
- Emblem of Algeria

- Flag of the President

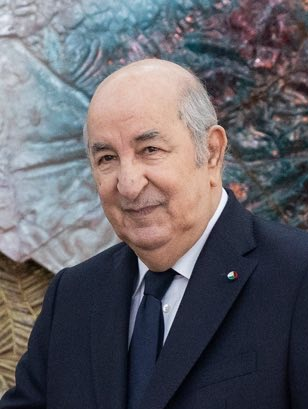
- Incumbent; Abdelmadjid Tebboune since 19 December 2019
- Government of Algeria
- Style: Mr President (informal); His Excellency (diplomatic)
- Status: Head of state; Commander-in-chief
- Residence: El Mouradia Palace
- Seat: Algiers, Algeria
- Appointer: Popular vote
- Term length: Five years, renewable once
- Constituting instrument: Constitution of Algeria (1963)
- Inaugural holder: Ahmed Ben Bella
- Formation: 15 September 1963; 62 years ago
- Deputy: President of the Council of the Nation
- Salary: د.ج 700,000 monthly
- Website: Official Webpage

Standard Arabic
- Abjad: رئيس الجمهورية الجزائرية الديمقراطية الشعبية
- Romanization: Ra’īs al-Jumhūriyyah al-Jazā’iriyyah ad-Dīmuqrāṭiyyah ash-Sha‘biyyah

The president of the People's Democratic Republic of Algeria (Arabic: رئيس الجمهورية الجزائرية الديمقراطية الشعبية, romanized: Raʼīs al-Jumhūriyyah al-Jazāʼiriyyah al-Dīmuqrāṭiyyah al-Shaʻbiyyah; French: Président de la République algérienne démocratique et populaire) is the head of state and chief executive of Algeria, as well as the commander-in-chief of the Algerian People's National Armed Forces.

The current president is Abdelmadjid Tebboune, who succeeded Abdelaziz Bouteflika on 19 December 2019.

== History of the office ==
The Tripoli Program, which served as Algeria's constitution when it won its war for independence from France in 1962, established the president as the head of state with a prime minister assisting in the operation of government. Internal political maneuvering resulted in a new constitution in 1963 that abolished the prime minister position and devolved all executive power upon the office of the president. For the first four decades of independence, the government was controlled as a one-party state by the National Liberation Front. The presidency was held by a succession of FLN members; Ahmed Ben Bella, Houari Boumédienne and Chadli Bendjedid. The constitution written in 1976 maintained the executive power of the Presidency, but the modifications of 1979 stripped the head of government status from the office.

Towards the end of the 1980s, there was a liberalization of the FLN regime. However, when the Islamic Salvation Front won parliamentary elections in 1991, the military forced Chadli Bendjedid to dissolve the parliament and resign on 11 January 1992. The military declared a state of emergency and took over government of the country, establishing a five-member High Council of State. The council appointed a president, Muhammad Boudiaf, to take office for a three-year term to facilitate a transfer back to normal elections for the office. However, Boudiaf was assassinated, and succeeded by Ali Kafi. Meanwhile, the country descended into a period of civil war, between the military government and Islamic guerrillas. Kafi was replaced in 1994 by Liamine Zéroual, who called the first of these elections in 1995, winning the full five-year term easily in disputed in election as the civil war was continuing. He called another early election in 1999, with the Islamic insurgency mostly suppressed. Abdelaziz Bouteflika won this election after all other candidates dropped out. He won re-election on 8 April 2004, in elections that were also disputed, won again in 2009, relatively unchallenged, and 2014; he declared his candidacy for a 5th term in the election scheduled for 18 April 2019, but, on 2 April 2019, he resigned before his 4th term ended, due to pressure from the military after protests.

As provided for under Article 102 of the Algerian Constitution, Abdelkader Bensalah, President of the Council of the Nation, became acting president of the country upon the resignation of Abdelaziz Bouteflika on 2 April 2019. His term could last for a maximum of 90 days, until elections, in which he could not participate, were held.

The current president is Abdelmadjid Tebboune, who won the 2019 Algerian presidential election on 12 December and assumed the office on 19 December 2019.

== Term limits ==
As of 2021, there is a two-term limit for the president in the Constitution of Algeria. The term limit was reinstated in 2016.

== Latest election ==
Candidate	Party	Votes	%
Abdelmadjid Tebboune	Independent	7,976,291	84.30
Abdelaali Hassani Cherif	Movement of Society for Peace	904,642	9.56
Youcef Aouchiche	Socialist Forces Front	580,495	6.14
Total		9,461,428	100.00
Valid votes		9,461,428	84.28
Invalid/blank votes		1,764,637	15.72
Total votes		11,226,065	100.00
Registered voters/turnout		24,351,551	46.10
Source: Algeria Press Service

== See also ==
- Politics of Algeria
- List of heads of state of Algeria
- Prime Minister of Algeria
- Vice President of Algeria
- Air transports of heads of state and government
