= Ahmed Benbitour =

Prime Minister of Algeria from 1999 to 2000

- أحمد بن بيتور
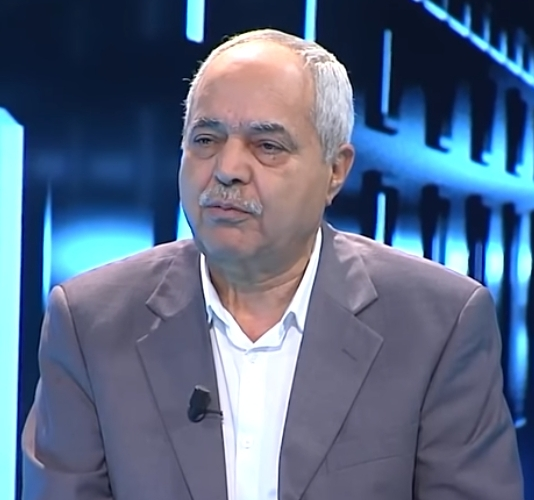

12th Prime Minister of Algeria
- In office 23 December 1999 – 27 August 2000
- President: Abdelaziz Bouteflika
- Preceded by: Smail Hamdani
- Succeeded by: Ali Benflis

Personal details
- Born: 20 June 1946 (age 80) Metlili, Algeria

An interview of him in 2019.

Ahmed Benbitour (Arabic: أحمد بن بيتور; born 20 June 1946) is an Algerian politician who was Head of Government of Algeria from 1999 to 2000.

== Life and career ==
Born at Metlili, Ghardaïa in the Chaamba Arab tribe, Benbitour received his doctorate from Université de Montréal.

Benbitour served in the government of Algeria as Minister of Energy from 1993 to 1994 and as Minister of Finance from 1994 to 1996. Subsequently, he was prime minister from December 1999 until August 2000, when he resigned. He stated in a later interview that he resigned due to disagreements with Abdelaziz Bouteflika, condemning Bouteflika's tendency to what he called governing by presidential decree and sidelining the Algerian Parliament, which he stated had no effective power.

Benbitour initially announced his candidacy for the 2014 Algerian presidential election. However, he withdrew in March 2014, stating that he would join calls to boycott the election, calling the election rigged. He again announced his non-candidacy for the 2019 Algerian presidential election after Bouteflika resigned following protests, but did not provide any reasons why. However, following Abdelmadjid Tebboune's win in the 2019 election, Benbitour met with Tebboune to discuss the general situation of the country.

Since his time as prime minister, he has criticized Algeria's overreliance on hydrocarbons. He strongly supported democratic change during the Arab Spring, and stated that there needed to be reform and transparency. He also stated that the emergency laws needed to be repealed.

== Works ==
- L' Algérie au troisième millénaire, Editions Marinoor (Algérie), 1998

Political offices
Preceded by Smail Hamdani	Head of Government of Algeria; 1999–2000	Succeeded by Ali Benflis
