= 1999 Algerian Civil Concord referendum =

- 16 September 1999
- Are you for or against the overall approach of the President of the Republic with a view to achieving peace and civil harmony?

Results
| Choice | Votes | % |
|---|---|---|
| Yes | 14,583,075 | 98.63% |
| No | 202,496 | 1.37% |
| Valid votes | 14,785,571 | 99.29% |
| Invalid or blank votes | 105,324 | 0.71% |
| Total votes | 14,890,895 | 100.00% |
| Registered voters/turnout | 17,512,726 | 85.03% |

A referendum on the Civil Concord Law was held in Algeria on 16 September 1999. The Civil Concord Law was an amnesty law that provided the legal framework to implement the 1995 "rahma" law promulgated by former President Liamine Zeroual. It was put forth by President Abdelaziz Bouteflika and adopted by parliament on 8 July 1999. The purpose of the law was to end the Algerian Civil War, and its most important element was its establishment of a system of clemency for Islamist fighters. The law was approved by 98% of voters with an 85% turnout. One factor contributing to the high level of support received by the referendum is the lack of guidance that opposition parties gave to their supporters, not wanting to appear to be voting "against peace."

== Background ==
The Civil Concord Law represented the conclusion of a three-year negotiation process that began in 1997 when direct talks between the Algerian army and the Islamic Salvation Army (AIS) achieved a ceasefire. The law declared that all citizens not involved in mass killings, sexual crimes and the bombing of public spaces would be placed under probation for three to five years and could continue to fight against rebel forces. Prison sentences were also severely decreased; perpetual imprisonment sentences were commuted to a maximum of eight years. Additionally, amnesty for all AIS fighters was included in the law. The success of this law was made evident in the return of thousands of Islamist fighters and the eventual complete dissolution of the AIS in January 2000.

== Results ==
| Choice | Votes | % |
|---|---|---|
| For | 14,583,075 | 98.63 |
| Against | 202,496 | 1.37 |
| Total | 14,785,571 | 100.00 |
| Valid votes | 14,785,571 | 99.29 |
| Invalid/blank votes | 105,324 | 0.71 |
| Total votes | 14,890,895 | 100.00 |
| Registered voters/turnout | 17,512,726 | 85.03 |
Source: Direct Democracy

== Aftermath ==
In 2005, President Bouteflika announced another referendum on the Charter for Peace and National Reconciliation, which further enabled the reintegration of militant fighters into Algerian civil society by further expanding the amnesty provisions originally detailed in the Civil Concord Law of 1999.
