= Louisa Hanoune =

Algerian politician (born 1954)

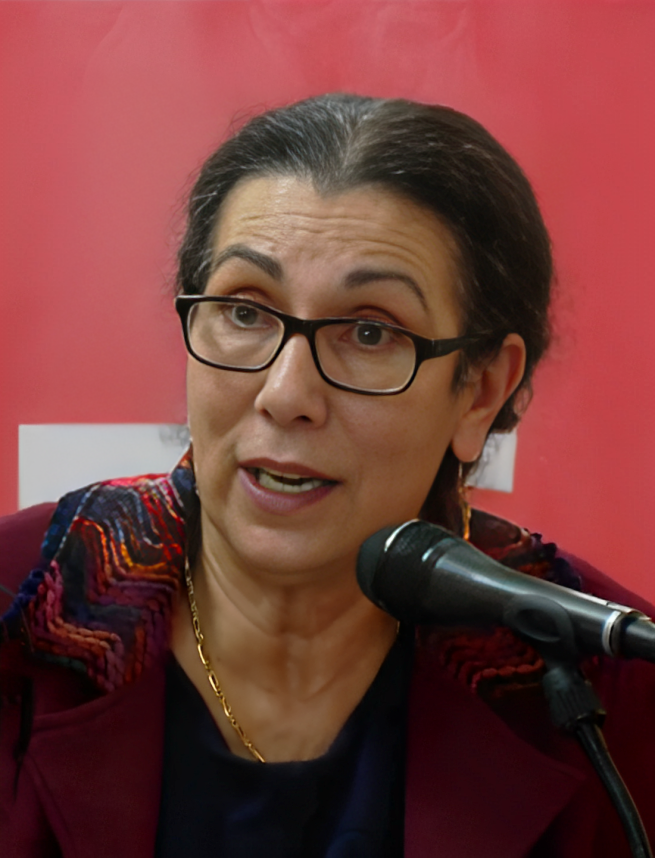

Personal details
- Born: 7 April 1954 (age 72) Chekfa, Jijel, Algeria
- Party: Workers' Party
- Education: University of Annaba

Louisa Hanoune (Arabic: لويزة حنون, Tamazight: ⵍⵡⵉⵣⴰ ⵃⴰⵏⵓⵏ; born 7 April 1954) is an Algerian politician, and the head of the Workers' Party (PT). In 2004, she became the first woman to run for President of Algeria. Hanoune was imprisoned by the government several times before the legalization of political parties in 1988. She was jailed soon after she joined the Trotskyist Social Workers Organisation, an illegal party, in 1981 and again after the 1988 October Riots, which brought about the end of the National Liberation Front's (FLN) single-party rule. During Algeria's civil war of the 1990s, Hanoune was one of the few opposition voices in parliament, and, despite her party's laicist values, a strong opponent of the government's "eradication" policy toward Islamists. In January 1995, she signed the Sant'Egidio Platform together with representatives of other opposition parties, notably the Islamic Salvation Front, the radical Islamist party whose dissolution by military decree brought about the start of the civil war.

== Early life ==
Hanoune was born in Chekfa, Jijel Province. Her parents were mountain peasants from Chekfa, Jijel Province, and she fled with her family to the city of Annaba after her parental home was bombed by the French army during the Algerian War (1954–1962). She was the first woman of her family to go to school. With Algeria's free and compulsory education system, Hanoune completed secondary school and went on to obtain her bachelor's degree before joining the air transport sector. Hanoune studied law at the University of Annaba, a decision which was opposed by her father. She has stated that "It is this right to education which will completely change the position, the representation of women in our society and of which I am partly a product."

== Workers' Party ==
Following the riots of 1988, Algeria adopted a pluralist system in 1989, which made it possible for Hanoune to establish the Workers' Party. It was founded in 1990 by writ of the Socialist Workers Organization. Their main platform is concerned with the class struggle between the workers or "exploited classes" and the owners or "oppressors". It is an independent party that supports the Algerian national movement. Hanoune has been the leader and spokesperson of the party since its inception and was elected Secretary General of the party in October 2005. In 2007, there were 23 parties contesting elections in Algeria.

She is known for denouncing the dissolution of the Islamic Salvation Front, being outspoken in favor of reconciliation, and—along with other parties—signing the Sant'Egidio platform "for a political solution to the Algerian crisis". During the period of newly-independent Algeria, Hanoune formed her political ideals: "The whole country was still pulsing from the war of liberation, everybody was talking about socialism, of justice, of progress. Algeria was at the height of its anti-imperialist battle... we were completely united with the Palestinians, their cause was also ours. We were against apartheid in South Africa, we talked about Vietnam, I grew up like all my generation in this militant atmosphere, of struggle."

== Presidential campaigns ==
Hanounes' first bid for the 1999 presidential election was rejected by the Constitutional Council, as she did not collect the required number of signatures to be on the ballot.

In the 2004 presidential election she however became the first female candidate in the entire Arab world to run for president. Only six candidates were recognized by the constitutional council.

Hanoune was one of eleven candidates who were nominated for the 2009 presidential election. Her platform included defending the principle of national sovereignty and denouncing the policy of liberalization and privatization of public enterprises. She won 4.22% of the vote, coming second out of six candidates, as President Abdelaziz Bouteflika won a third term with 90.24% of the votes cast in an election which was denounced as fraudulent.

In the 2014 presidential election, she finished fourth receiving only 1.37% of the votes. In the party's press conference she accepted the defeat and insisted that the elections were carried through in a correct way and this time without any fraud. "Bouteflika has won, people have chosen stability," she said.

In July 2024, Louisa Hanoune announced the withdrawal of her candidacy and criticized the “unjust conditions” in which the campaign was taking place. Accusing the Algerian regime of intending to exclude her and prevent free candidacy without clarifying those details, Hanoune criticized the National Independent Authority for Elections for its failure to manage the signature collection process. She pointed to a lack of technical equipment and intimidation by municipal employees.

== Other activities ==
At the international level, Hanoune was a founding member of the International Workers and Peoples in January 1991. She has participated as a representative of PT conferences against privatization and for the defense of trade union organizations and campaigned for workplace standards. She is a committee member of the women workers and of the Africa Committee of the International Workers. She was involved with a coalition of unions that spoke out against the war in Iraq, including the International Confederation of Arab Trade Unions and the International Confederation of Workers (EIT).

In March 2010, Hanoune joined other women's-rights activists in calling for the repeal of Algeria's Family Code on the grounds of its failure to provide adequate protection for females.

In February 2011, she criticised a 12 February anti-Bouteflika demonstration in Algiers as social manipulation—"trying to manipulate the social discontent, which is real, to divert it in the service of imperialism"—and prescribed

A clean break with the European Union, the repeal of all the concessions made to the World Trade Organization (WTO), and a return to full economic sovereignty.

She noted that the demonstration had been supported by former prime minister and International Monetary Fund/World Bank consultant Ahmed Benbitour. Her editorial message called on "activists, members and supporters to form popular committees ... to establish their demands through free discussion, and [press for] exclusively national, Algerian solutions".

In September 2019, Hanoune was imprisoned for political reasons by the then-interim Algerian military regime. At the beginning of 2020, after a judicial appeal, her sentence was reduced, and she is now free.
