= Larbi Belkheir =

Algerian general

Maj.-Gen. Larbi Belkheir (Arabic: العربي بلخير) was an Algerian general and political figure.

== Biography ==
He was born in Frenda (now in Tiaret Province) in 1938, and joined the French army, reaching the rank of second lieutenant. After independence in 1962, he was sent to the Soviet Union for further training. After returning, he became chief of staff at Ouargla, then for the entire 2nd Military Region (around Oran). In 1975, he became director of ENITA, a military technical institute at Bordj El Bahri. He was close to the next president, Chadli Bendjedid, whom he helped choose; under Bendjedid's rule, he became head of the High Council for Security, secretary-general of the presidency, and head of the Cabinet, and attained the rank of major-general. From 18 October 1991 to 19 July 1992, during Algeria's first free elections, he was Minister of the Interior.

However, in 1992, dissatisfied with the election results, he helped lead the military coup that deposed Chadli Bendjedid and annulled the elections, starting the Algerian Civil War. In 1999, he helped Bouteflika become president, and shortly afterwards, in October 2000, became head of his Cabinet.

In August 2005, he was appointed ambassador to Morocco.

In 2001, Belkheir was accused by Hichem Abboud of ordering the assassination of FFS activist Ali Mecili in Paris in 1987; he responded by unsuccessfully suing Abboud for libel. In December 2003, a refugee, Mehdi Mosbah, filed a suit against Belkheir in Paris for torture, on the basis that he had headed the Interior Ministry at the time and was thus responsible for police conduct; however, Belkheir left France soon after.

He died on 28 January 2010, Ain Naadja, and was buried at Ben Aknoun cemetery.
