= Liamine Zéroual =

President of Algeria from 1994 to 1999

- اليمين زروال
- Official portrait, 1994

6th President of Algeria
- In office 31 January 1994 – 27 April 1999
- Prime Minister: Redha Malek; Mokdad Sifi; Ahmed Ouyahia; Smail Hamdani
- Preceded by: Ali Kafi
- Succeeded by: Abdelaziz Bouteflika

Minister of Defence
- In office 10 July 1993 – 27 April 1999
- Preceded by: Khaled Nezzar
- Succeeded by: Abdelaziz Bouteflika

Personal details
- Born: 3 July 1941 Batna, French Algeria
- Died: 28 March 2026 (aged 84) Algiers, Algeria
- Resting place: Batna Central Cemetery
- Party: Independent

Military service
- Allegiance: Algeria
- Branch: National Liberation Army; People's National Army
- Service years: NLA (1957–1962); PNP (1962–1989)
- Rank: Major General
- Commands: Cherchell Military Academy (1981–1982); Tamanrasset Military Region (1982–1984)
- Conflict: Algerian War

Liamine Zéroual (Arabic: اليمين زروال; ALA-LC: al-Yamīn Zarwāl; Berber: Lyamin Ẓerwal; 3 July 1941 – 28 March 2026) was an Algerian politician who served as the sixth president of Algeria from 31 January 1994 to 27 April 1999.

== Life and career ==
Zéroual was born in Batna on 3 July 1941. He joined the National Liberation Army in 1957, at the age of 16, to fight French rule of Algeria. After independence, he received training in Cairo, Egypt, then Moscow, Soviet Union (1965–1966) and finally Paris. In 1975, he took command of a military school in Batna, then in 1981 of the Cherchell Military Academy. He was then made commander of the Tamanrasset military region in 1982, then the 3rd Military Region on the Moroccan border in 1984, then that of Constantine in 1987. He became a general in 1988, then head of ground forces in 1989.

After disagreeing with President Chadli Bendjedid about proposals for army reorganisation, he left the ANP in 1989, and briefly became ambassador to Romania. However, after Bendjedid's forced resignation in January 1992, his career prospects became more promising. In July 1993, he became Minister of Defense; in January 1994 he was promoted to head of the High Council of State. In November 1995, he was elected President, a post which he retained until the next elections. He was reputed to be politically dialoguist, supporting a partly negotiated solution to the Algerian Civil War. On 25 December 1994 Zéroual reluctantly allowed hijacked Air France Flight 8969 to leave Algerian territory after 3 civilians, including a French embassy chef, were murdered by the four hijackers.

Although some urged Zéroual to run in the 2009 presidential election, he said in a published statement on 14 January 2009 that he would not run, while also suggesting that it was not in the best interests of democracy for President Abdelaziz Bouteflika to run for a third term.

He also refused to run in the 2014 presidential election. In 2019, Zéroual said he had turned down a request by Mohamed Mediene, the former head of the Department of Intelligence and Security to lead a transition government following the resignation of president Bouteflika.

Zéroual died at the Aïn Naâdja Military Hospital in Algiers, on 28 March 2026, at the age of 84.

== Honours ==
=== National honour ===
- Grand Master of the National Order of Merit

Political offices
Preceded by Ali Kafi as Chairman of the High Council of State	President of Algeria; 1994–1999	Succeeded by Abdelaziz Bouteflika
