= Ahd 54 =

Political party in Algeria

- Leader: Ali Fawzi Rebaine
- Founded: 1991
- Ideology: Algerian nationalism Human rights

Ahd 54 (Arabic: عهد 54), "Generation of '54", is a minor Algerian party led by human rights-activist Ali Fawzi Rebaine, who claims to have founded the first Algerian human rights organization. Its name is an allusion to the start of the Algerian War of Independence, in November 1954. In the 2007 election, it won 2.26% of the vote and two seats in the Algerian parliament.

== Electoral history ==
=== Presidential elections ===
Election	Party candidate	Votes	%	Result
2004	Ali Fawzi Rebaine	63,761	0.63%	Lost ✗
2009	Ali Fawzi Rebaine	124,559	0.86%	Lost ✗
2014	Ali Fawzi Rebaine	101,046	0.99%	Lost ✗

=== People's National Assembly elections ===
Election	Party leader	Votes	%	Seats	+/–
1991	Ali Fawzi Rebaine	2,490	0.0%	0 / 231	Steady
2007	Ali Fawzi Rebaine	129,300	2.26%	2 / 386	▲2
2012	Ali Fawzi Rebaine	120,201	1.57%	3 / 462	▲1
2017	Ali Fawzi Rebaine	42,160	0.65%	2 / 462	▼1
