= 2014 Algerian presidential election =

Third re-election of Abdelaziz Bouteflika

- 17 April 2014
- Registered: 21,871,393
- Turnout: 51.70%
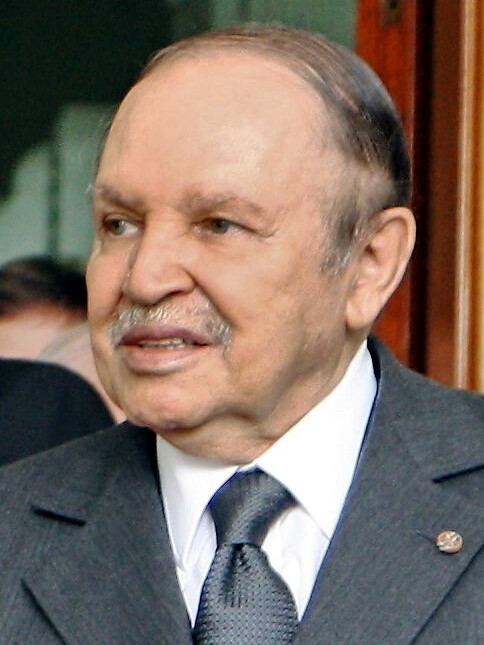

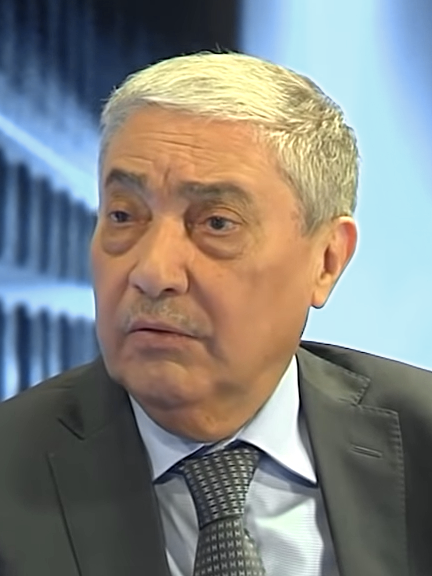
Nominee	Abdelaziz Bouteflika	Ali Benflis
Party	FLN	Independent
Popular vote	8,332,598	1,244,918
Percentage	81.53%	12.18%
- Results by province
President before election
Abdelaziz Bouteflika
FLN
Elected President
Abdelaziz Bouteflika
FLN

Presidential elections were held in Algeria on 17 April 2014. Incumbent President Abdelaziz Bouteflika was re-elected with 82% of the vote. Issues in the campaign included a desire for domestic stability after the bloody civil war of the 1990s, the state of the economy (30% unemployment), the frail health of 77-year-old president Abdelaziz Bouteflika who had been in power for fifteen years, and whose speech was "slurred and inaudible" in his only public outing during the campaign, and the less-than-wholehearted support given the president by the normally united and discrete ruling class.

== Background ==
Following the 2009 presidential elections, the region and the country (to a lesser degree) was engulfed by the Arab Spring. A series of protests took place between 2010 and 2012, but the country did not undergo regime change unlike neighbouring Tunisia and Libya.

== Candidates ==
In November 2013, the National Liberation Front endorsed the ailing incumbent Abdelaziz Bouteflika as its candidate in the race. Bouteflika's candidacy was confirmed by then-Prime Minister Abdelmalek Sellal (who would be later re-appointed to said post) in late February. Ali Benflis, a former Prime Minister, announced on 19 January 2014 that he was running for the presidency. Louisa Hanoune, the secretary-general of the Workers Party, presented her candidacy on 21 January 2014.

== Campaign ==
The campaign officially started on 22 March 2014. Bouteflika only appeared in the campaigning twice, leaving others in the party to campaign.

=== Boycott and protests ===
The Islamist Movement of Society for Peace announced on 25 January 2014 that it would boycott the elections. The Islamic Renaissance Movement announced on 7 February 2014 that it will also boycott the vote. On 22 March, about 5,000 people rallied in Algiers for a boycott due to Bouteflika seeking another term and called for reforms to the political system. Both Islamic and secular parties were present with Rally for Culture and Democracy's Mohsen Belabes saying: "The people here are the people who have been excluded, who have been put aside, but this is the real Algeria. The regime will collapse, but Algeria will survive".

A movement called Barakat expressed rejection of a fourth term for Abdelaziz Bouteflika, opposed the nature of the elections, and has organized protests demanding a new political order.

== Opinion polls ==
An opinion poll conducted by Echaâb in March showed the incumbent president Bouteflika winning.

== Conduct ==
The electoral commission reported that there were just a few incidents which entailed just 130 complaints. However, incidents of violence were recorded as groups of youths in the Berber-dominated Kabylie's Bouira region ransacked voting centres in Raffour, M'Chedellah and Saharij just after they opened at 7:00, with riot police then firing tear gas at them. At least 70 people were injured, including 47 policemen as voting was temporarily suspended. In Raffour, masked and armed youths with slings chanted hostile slogans and confronted the police were firing tear gas.

== Results ==
Interior Minister Taieb Belaiz announced on 18 April that Abdelaziz Bouteflika had won 81.53% of the vote, while Ali Benflis came in second with 12.18%. The turnout was 51.7%, down from the 75% turnout in 2009. Turnout was as low as 20.01% in Tizi Ouzou to as high as 82% in Relizane. Nearly 10% of ballots cast were blank or invalid.

Candidate	Party	Votes	%
Abdelaziz Bouteflika	National Liberation Front	8,332,598	81.53
Ali Benflis	Independent	1,244,918	12.18
Abdelaziz Belaïd	Future Front	343,624	3.36
Louisa Hanoune	Workers' Party	140,253	1.37
Ali Fawzi Rebaine	Ahd 54	101,046	0.99
Moussa Touati	Algerian National Front	57,590	0.56
Total		10,220,029	100.00
Valid votes		10,220,029	90.38
Invalid/blank votes		1,087,449	9.62
Total votes		11,307,478	100.00
Registered voters/turnout		21,871,393	51.70
Source: Interior Ministry

=== Reactions ===
After the polls closed, Benflis criticised the election as having been marked by "fraud on a massive scale." The turnout figures were also criticised for allegedly being inflated by unnamed activists and opposition politicians. Benflis told his supporters at his headquarters that due to the scale of the alleged fraud and irregularities: "Our history will remember this date as a great crime against the nation by stealing the voice of the citizens and blocking popular will." At the same time, Bouteflika supporters celebrated with fireworks.
