= 2004 Algerian presidential election =

First re-election of Abdelaziz Bouteflika

- 8 April 2004
- Registered: 18,094,555
- Turnout: 58.08%
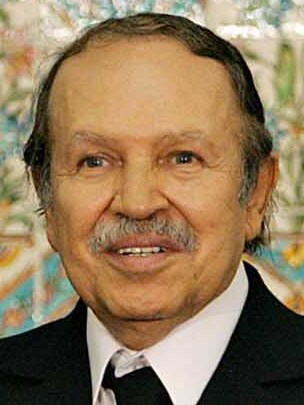

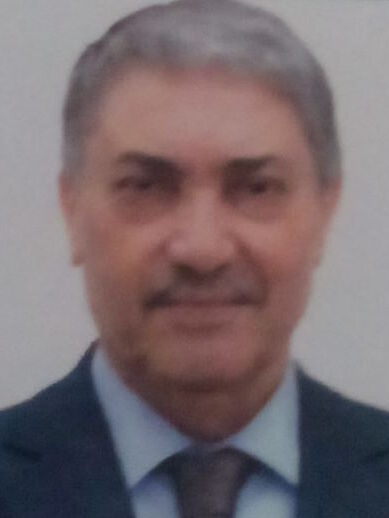

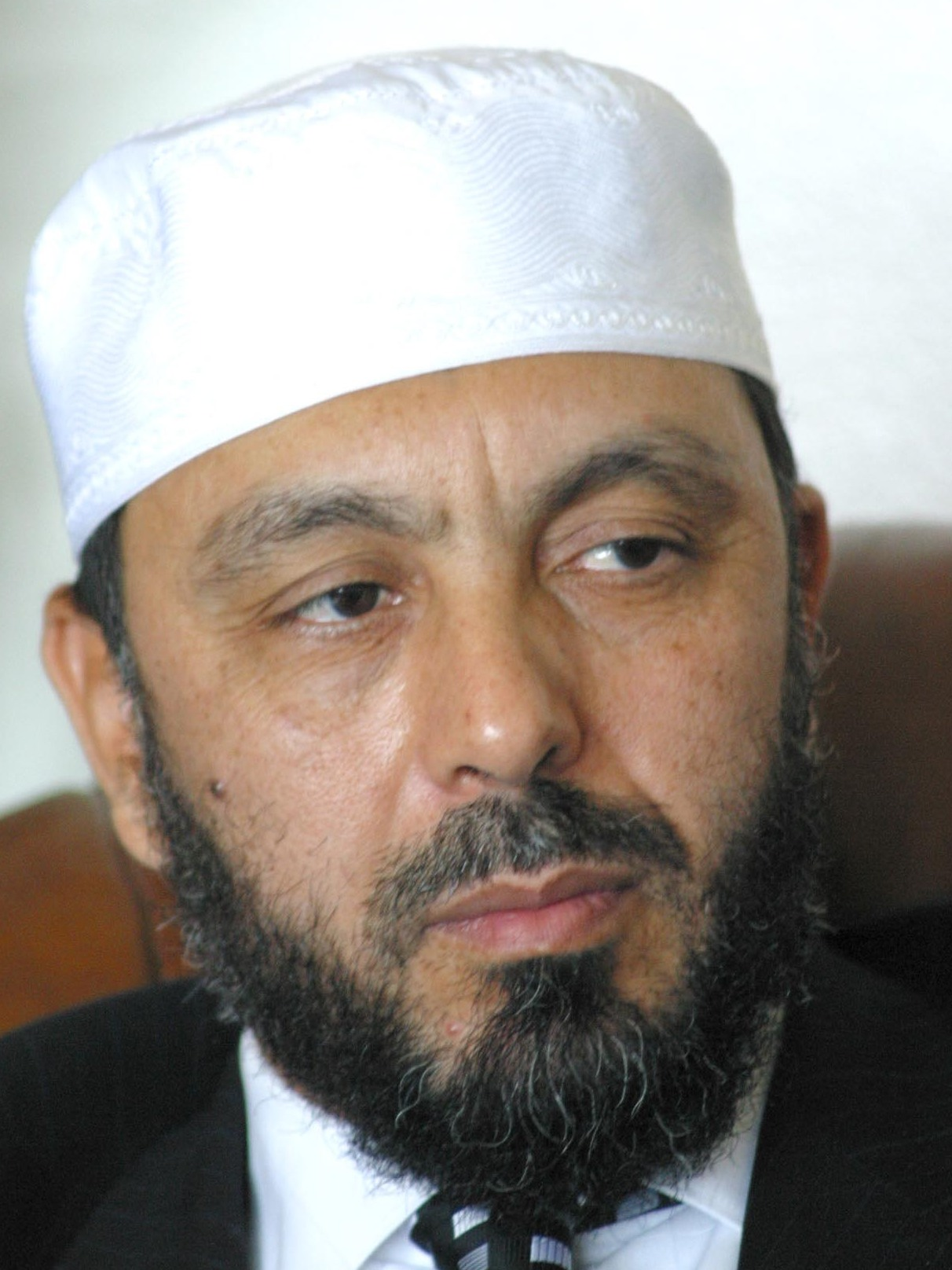
| Nominee | Abdelaziz Bouteflika | Ali Benflis | Abdallah Djaballah |
| Party | RND | FLN | MRN |
| Popular vote | 8,651,723 | 653,951 | 511,526 |
| Percentage | 84.99% | 6.42% | 5.02% |
President before election
Abdelaziz Bouteflika
FLN
Elected President
Abdelaziz Bouteflika
FLN

Presidential elections were held in Algeria on 8 April 2004. Incumbent President Abdelaziz Bouteflika was re-elected with 85% of the vote.

== Candidates ==
- Ali Benflis, candidate of the National Liberation Front (FLN)
- Abdelaziz Bouteflika, candidate of a coalition including the Movement for the Society of Peace (MSP) and the National Rally for Democracy Assembly (RND), as well as a dissident faction of the National Liberation Front (FLN)
- Abdallah Djaballah, candidate of the Movement for National Reform
- Ali Fawzi Rebaine, candidate of the Ahd 54 Party
- Louisa Hanoune, candidate of the Workers' Party
- Said Sadi, candidate of the Rally for Culture and Democracy

== Conduct ==
There were about 130 official foreign observers in Algeria for these elections, which followed more than a decade of civil conflict. Delegations of observers came from the Arab League, the African Union, the United Nations, the European Parliament and the Organization for Security and Cooperation in Europe (OSCE).

An OSCE spokesman said its small election monitoring team observed no obvious electoral fraud, and that the election, while not perfect, was excellent by regional standards and that it is "pretty clear" the results reflected the views of the Algerian people.

However, the Kabyle population boycotted the elections following the Arouch directives, only 10% (officially) of them went to vote.

== Results ==
| Candidate | Party | Votes | % |
|---|---|---|---|
| Abdelaziz Bouteflika | National Rally for Democracy | 8,651,723 | 84.99 |
| Ali Benflis | National Liberation Front | 653,951 | 6.42 |
| Abdallah Djaballah | Movement for National Reform | 511,526 | 5.02 |
| Said Sadi | Rally for Culture and Democracy | 197,111 | 1.94 |
| Louisa Hanoune | Workers' Party | 101,630 | 1.00 |
| Ali Fawzi Rebaine | Ahd 54 | 63,761 | 0.63 |
| Total | | 10,179,702 | 100.00 |
| Valid votes | | 10,179,702 | 96.87 |
| Invalid/blank votes | | 329,075 | 3.13 |
| Total votes | | 10,508,777 | 100.00 |
| Registered voters/turnout | | 18,094,555 | 58.08 |
Source: Algeria Official Journal
