= Workers' Party (Algeria) =

Political party in Algeria

Workers' Party: حزب العمال (Arabic); ⴰⴽⴰⴱⴰⵔ ⵢⵅⴻⴷⴷⴰⵎⴻⵏ (Berber languages); Akabar ixeddamen (Berber languages); Parti des travailleurs (French)
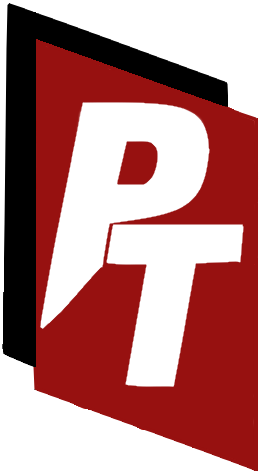
- Abbreviation: PT
- Secretary-General: Louisa Hanoune
- Founded: 1990
- Headquarters: Rue Belkheir Belkacem Hassen-Badi 2, El Harrach, Algiers
- Ideology: Communism; Marxism; Trotskyism
- Political position: Left-wing to far-left
- National affiliation: Forces of the Democratic Alternative
- Colours: Red
- Council of the Nation: 0 / 174
- People's National Assembly: 3 / 407
- People's Provincial Assemblies: 28 / 2,004
- Municipalities: 17 / 1,540
- People's Municipal Assemblies: 510 / 24,876

Website
- www.pt.dz

The Workers' Party (Arabic: حزب العمال, romanized: ḥizb al-ʿummāl, Standard Algerian Berber: ⴰⴽⴰⴱⴰⵔ ⵢⵅⴻⴷⴷⴰⵎⴻⵏ, romanized: Akabar ixeddamen, French: Parti des travailleurs) is a Trotskyist political party in Algeria, closely linked with the Independent Workers' Party of France. The party is led by Louisa Hanoune.

The Workers' Party, which uses the abbreviation "PT", advocates for the protection and promotion of trade union movements in Algeria, from its claims, including a figure egalitarian doctrine is to claim that a better distribution of wealth on the people of country. The creation of this party back to the year 1990, one year after the constitutional reform which introduced a multiparty system. Its Secretary-General is Louisa Hanoune, who in 2004 was the first woman in the Arab world to stand as a candidate for a presidential election.

The Workers' Party received 3.3 percent of the vote and elected 21 members to parliament in the 2002 legislative elections. In the 2004 presidential elections, Hanoune was the first woman in Algeria to run for the office. She received 101,630 votes (1 percent).

In the 2007 parliamentary elections it was the biggest opposition party, winning 5.08% of the vote and 26 seats out of 389. The three party coalition (National Liberation Front (FLN), National Rally for Democracy (RND) and Movement of Society for Peace) won 249 of the 389. Turnout was just 35%

In the 2007 regional and municipal elections, it won in over 1,000 elections winning 6.5% of the vote.

== History ==
The Workers' Party was founded in 1990 by workers, trade unionists, peasants and youth at the initiative of the Socialist Workers Organization, on a platform of class struggle deriving from what it sees as the major contradiction between the interests of workers and "exploited classes", and "oppressed" and those of owners, "exploiters" and "oppressors". Louisa Hanoune has been its president since its inception.

The PT aims to provide workers with independent political representation.

The Workers' Party claims continuity with the Algerian national movement, in particular the North African Star and the Algerian People's Party. It is at odds with what it sees as "imperialism" embodied in the activities of the International Monetary Fund, the World Trade Organization, the World Bank, the European Union, the New Partnership for Africa's Development (NEPAD), etc. Part of the labor movement internationally, the Workers' Party wishes to achieve socialism.

The party is a member of the International Liaison Committee for a Workers' International.

== The PT ==
The PT campaigns for the cancellation of external debt, the defense of nationalization of land, natural soil and subsoil, businesses and infrastructure (railways, water, electricity, ports, airports, cultural and artistic heritage, telecommunications, air and sea).

It favors the preservation of public enterprises against privatization and for the re-nationalization of public services and enterprises which have been privatized. It campaigns for the right to free and compulsory public education until the age of 16, and against private education. It campaigns for the prohibition of child labour, the right to public health care, for the right to housing.

It campaigns for a national development plan based around public works, funded by public investment and agrarian reform. The party opposes localism.

== Ideology and Issues ==
The PT is a communist party in the Trotskyist tradition. The party supports cancellation of international debts, favors compulsory education until the age of 16, and the nationalization of natural resources.

The Workers' Party calls for the election of a Constituent Assembly by direct universal suffrage and secret ballot.

In the immediate future the Workers' Party considers major issues to be:

- The release of all political prisoners.
- The resolution of the issue of missing persons.
- The right to organize
- The restoration of all democratic freedoms, including lifting the state of emergency and all emergency measures, the restoration of freedom of the press, and allowing for trade union activity.
- Respect for the multiparty system.
- The equal rights between women and men, which would entail the repeal of the Family Code and the enactment of civil laws giving full citizenship to women,
- The recognition of Tamazight as an official language, and that it be taught in schools and used in public institutions.
- The right to a permanent work for all those who live.
- A sliding scale of wages and pensions, indexed for the cost of living.
- The preservation of the social security system and retirement pay.
- The right to collective bargaining.
- The preservation of current positions within the public sector
- Prohibition of any wages below the minimum wage.
- The ratification of all ILO Conventions
- The establishment of a minimum income for first job seekers and unemployment compensation for laid-off workers.

To achieve its objectives, the Workers Party is in favor of utilizing instruments of democracy, political action, and organized workers' groups.

== Electoral history ==
=== Presidential elections ===
Election	Party candidate	Votes	%	Result
2004	Louisa Hanoune	101,630	1.00%	Lost ✗
2009	Louisa Hanoune	649,632	4.50%	Lost ✗
2014	Louisa Hanoune	140,253	1.37%	Lost ✗

=== People's National Assembly elections ===
People's National Assembly
Election	Party leader	Votes	%	Seats	+/–
1997	Louisa Hanoune	194,493	1.9%	4 / 380	▲4
2002	Louisa Hanoune	246.770	3.3%	21 / 389	▲17
2007	Louisa Hanoune	291,312	5.08%	26 / 386	▲5
2012	Louisa Hanoune	283,585	3.71%	24 / 462	▼2
2017	Louisa Hanoune	191,965	2.97%	11 / 462	▼13
2021	Louisa Hanoune	Did not contest	Did not contest	0 / 462	▼11
2026	Louisa Hanoune	59,991	1.43%	3 / 462	▲3
