= 2009 Algerian presidential election =

Second re-election of Abdelaziz Bouteflika

- 9 April 2009
- Registered: 20,595,683
- Turnout: 74.56%
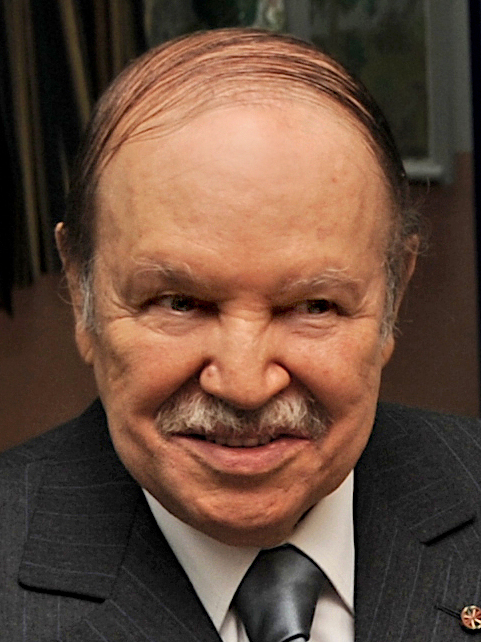

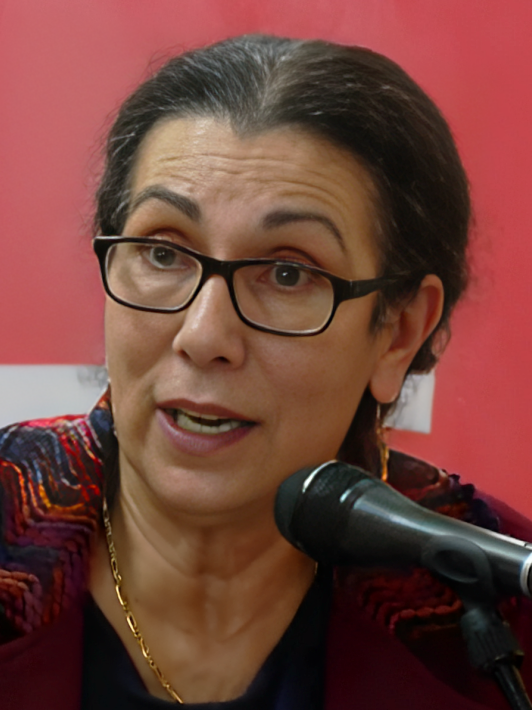
Nominee	Abdelaziz Bouteflika	Louisa Hanoune
Party	FLN	PT
Popular vote	13,019,787	649,632
Percentage	90.23%	4.50%
- Results by province
President before election
Abdelaziz Bouteflika
FLN
Elected President
Abdelaziz Bouteflika
FLN

Presidential elections were held in Algeria on 9 April 2009. The result was a victory for incumbent President Abdelaziz Bouteflika, who was re-elected with 90% of the vote.

== Background ==
The Council of Ministers announced on 3 November 2008 that a planned constitutional revision would remove the two-term limit on the presidency that was previously included in Article 74, thereby enabling Bouteflika to run for a third term. The People's National Assembly endorsed the removal of the term limit on 12 November 2008, with only the Rally for Culture and Democracy (RCD) voting against its removal.

== Candidates ==
Thirteen candidates submitted papers to contest the election, but only six were approved to run:

- Abdelaziz Bouteflika, incumbent president and leader of the National Liberation Front. Supported by the Democratic National Rally
- Louisa Hanoune, candidate of the Workers' Party
- Moussa Touati, candidate of the Algerian National Front (FNA)
- Belaïd Mohand-Oussaïd, independent candidate supported by his Party of Justice and Liberty (which was not recognised at the time of the election)
- Djahid Younsi, candidate of the Movement for National Reform
- Ali Fawzi Rebaine, candidate of Ahd 54

Although some urged former President Liamine Zéroual to run, he said in a published statement on 14 January 2009 that he would not, while also suggesting that it was not in the best interests of democracy for Bouteflika to run for a third term.

RCD President Saïd Sadi announced on 15 January 2009 that the RCD would not participate in the elections, which he described as a "pathetic and dangerous circus", saying that to participate "would be tantamount to complicity in an operation of national humiliation".

Bouteflika announced his independent candidacy for a third term at a rally in Algiers on 12 February, and officially submitted his candidacy on 23 February, shortly before the deadline.

== Results ==
The official turnout of 75% was disputed by the opposition, with some claiming it was as low as 16%.

Candidate	Party	Votes	%
Abdelaziz Bouteflika	National Liberation Front	13,019,787	90.23
Louisa Hanoune	Workers' Party	649,632	4.50
Moussa Touati	Algerian National Front	294,411	2.04
Djahid Younsi	Movement for National Reform	208,549	1.45
Belaïd Mohand-Oussaïd	Independent	133,315	0.92
Ali Fawzi Rebaine	Ahd 54	124,559	0.86
Total		14,430,253	100.00
Valid votes		14,430,253	93.97
Invalid/blank votes		925,771	6.03
Total votes		15,356,024	100.00
Registered voters/turnout		20,595,683	74.56
Source: Electoral Studies
