= Ali Fawzi Rebaine =

Algerian politician

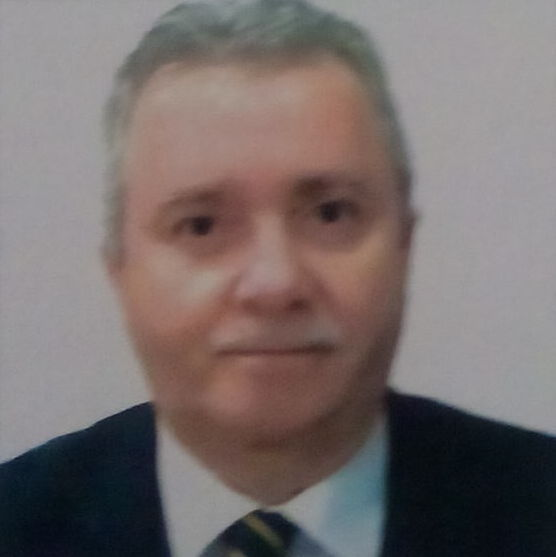
Portrait of Ali Fawzi Rebaine

Ali Fawzi Rebaine (Arabic: علي فوزي رباعين) (born 24 January 1955 in Algiers) is the leader of the Ahd 54 political party in Algeria.

He is an optician and human rights-activist, and claims to have founded Algeria's first independent human rights association. In 1983-84 and again in 1985–87, he was imprisoned by the Algerian government for endangering the security of the state and forming an illegal association.

Rebaine founded Ahd 54 (named after the start of the Algerian War of Independence in 1954) and became its first secretary-general in 1991. He was re-elected in 1998, although the party has had little impact on Algerian politics. Rebaine ran again as its candidate in the Algerian presidential election of 2004, but ended up with only 0,6% of the vote.
