= Abdelaziz Bouteflika =

President of Algeria from 1999 to 2019

Abdelaziz Bouteflika GColIH
- عَبد الْعَزِيْز بُوتَفْلِيْقَة
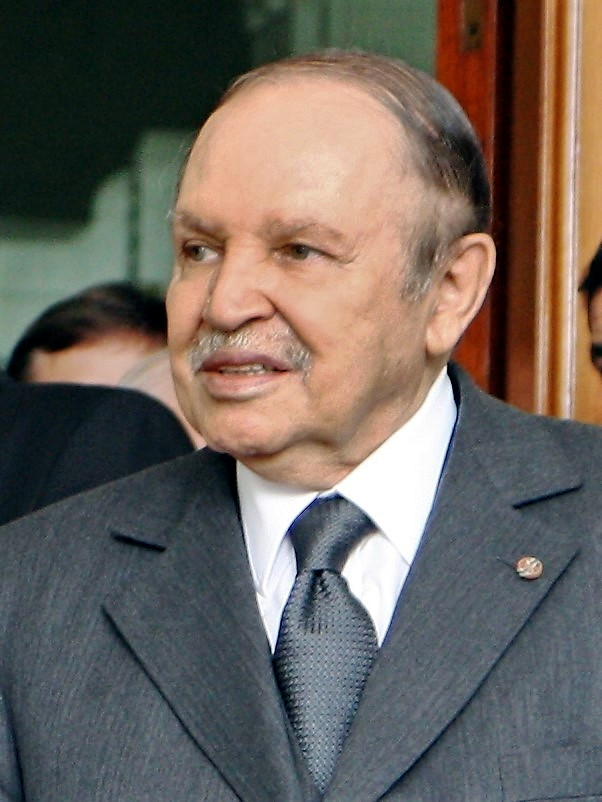
- Bouteflika in 2012

7th President of Algeria
- In office 27 April 1999 – 2 April 2019
- Prime Minister: See list: Smail Hamdani; Ahmed Benbitour; Ali Benflis; Ahmed Ouyahia; Abdelaziz Belkhadem; Ahmed Ouyahia; Abdelmalek Sellal; Youcef Yousfi (acting); Abdelmalek Sellal; Abdelmadjid Tebboune; Ahmed Ouyahia; Noureddine Bedoui
- Preceded by: Liamine Zéroual
- Succeeded by: Abdelkader Bensalah (acting); Abdelmadjid Tebboune

5th Chairperson of National Liberation Front
- In office 28 January 2005 – 17 September 2021
- Preceded by: Chadli Bendjedid

Minister of Defence
- In office 17 June 2002 – 2 April 2019
- Deputy: Ahmed Gaid Salah
- Preceded by: Liamine Zéroual
- Succeeded by: Abdelmadjid Tebboune

President of the United Nations General Assembly
- In office 17 September 1974 – 15 September 1975
- Preceded by: Leopoldo Benites
- Succeeded by: Gaston Thorn

Minister of Foreign Affairs
- In office 4 September 1963 – 8 March 1979
- Preceded by: Mohamed Khemisti
- Succeeded by: Mohammed Seddik Benyahia

Minister of Youth, Sports and Touring
- In office 27 September 1962 – 4 September 1963
- Succeeded by: Sadek Batel (Youth and Sports); Kaïd Ahmed (Touring)

Chairperson of the Organisation of African Unity
- In office 12 July 1999 – 10 July 2000

Personal details
- Born: 2 March 1937 Oujda, French Morocco
- Died: 17 September 2021 (aged 84) Zéralda, Algeria
- Resting place: El Alia Cemetery, Algiers
- Party: Independent
- Other political affiliations: National Liberation Front
- Spouse: Amal Triki (m. 1990, divorced)
- Relatives: Saïd Bouteflika (brother)
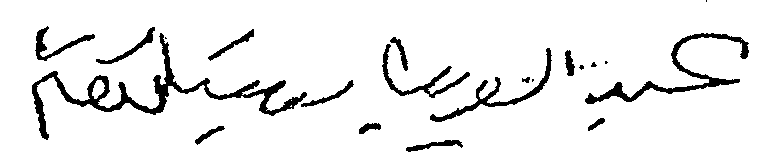
- Signature

Military service
- Allegiance: Provisional Government of the Algerian Republic
- Branch/service: National Liberation Army
- Years of service: 1956–1962
- Battles/wars: Algerian War; Algerian Civil War (Concord referendum)

Abdelaziz Bouteflika (Arabic: عَبد الْعَزِيْز بُوتَفْلِيْقَة, romanized: ʿAbd al-ʿAzīz Būtaflīqa, Arabic pronunciation: [ʕabd elʕaziːz buːtefliːqa]; 2 March 1937 – 17 September 2021) was an Algerian politician and diplomat who served as the seventh president of Algeria from 1999 to 2019.

Bouteflika served during the Algerian War as a member of the National Liberation Front. After Algeria gained its independence from France, he served as the Minister of Foreign Affairs from 1963 to 1979, and was also President of the United Nations General Assembly during its twenty-ninth session (1974–1975). In 1983 he was convicted of stealing millions of dinars from Algerian embassies during his diplomatic career.

In 1999, Bouteflika was elected president of Algeria in a landslide victory. He was re-elected in 2004, 2009, and 2014. As president, he presided over the end of the Algerian Civil War in 2002 when he took over the project of his immediate predecessor President Liamine Zéroual, and he ended emergency rule in February 2011 amidst regional unrest. Following a stroke in 2013, Bouteflika reduced his public appearances throughout his fourth term, making his final appearance in 2017.

Bouteflika resigned on 2 April 2019 amid months of mass protests opposing his candidacy for a fifth term. Having served for nearly 20 years, he is Algeria's longest-serving president to date. Following his resignation, Bouteflika became a recluse and died at the age of 84 in 2021, over two years after his resignation.

== Early life and education ==
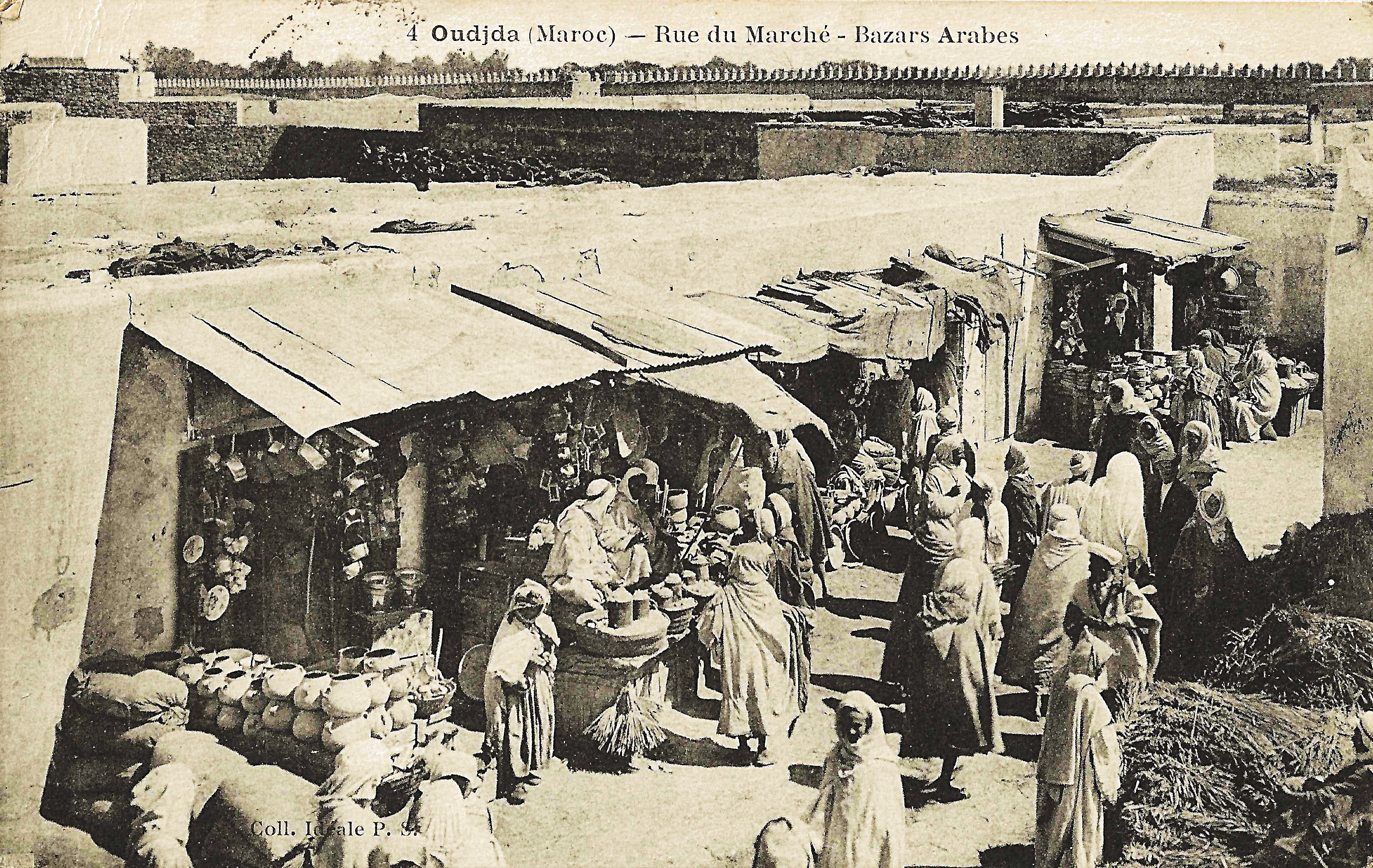
Market street in Oujda, around 1920.

Abdelaziz Bouteflika was born on 2 March 1937 in Oujda, Morocco. He was the son of Mansouria Ghezlaoui and Ahmed Bouteflika from Tlemcen, Algeria. He had three half-sisters (Fatima, Yamina, and Aïcha), as well as four brothers (Abdelghani, Mustapha, Abderahim, and Saïd) and one sister (Latifa). Saïd Bouteflika, 20 years his junior, would later be appointed special counselor to his brother in 1999. Unlike Saïd, who was raised mostly in Tlemcen, Abdelaziz grew up in Oujda, where his father had emigrated as a youngster. The son of a zaouia sheikh, he was well-versed in the Qur'an. He successively attended three schools in Oudja: Sidi Ziane, El Hoceinia, and Abdel Moumen High Schools, where he reportedly excelled academically. He was also affiliated with Qadiriyya Zaouia in Oujda.

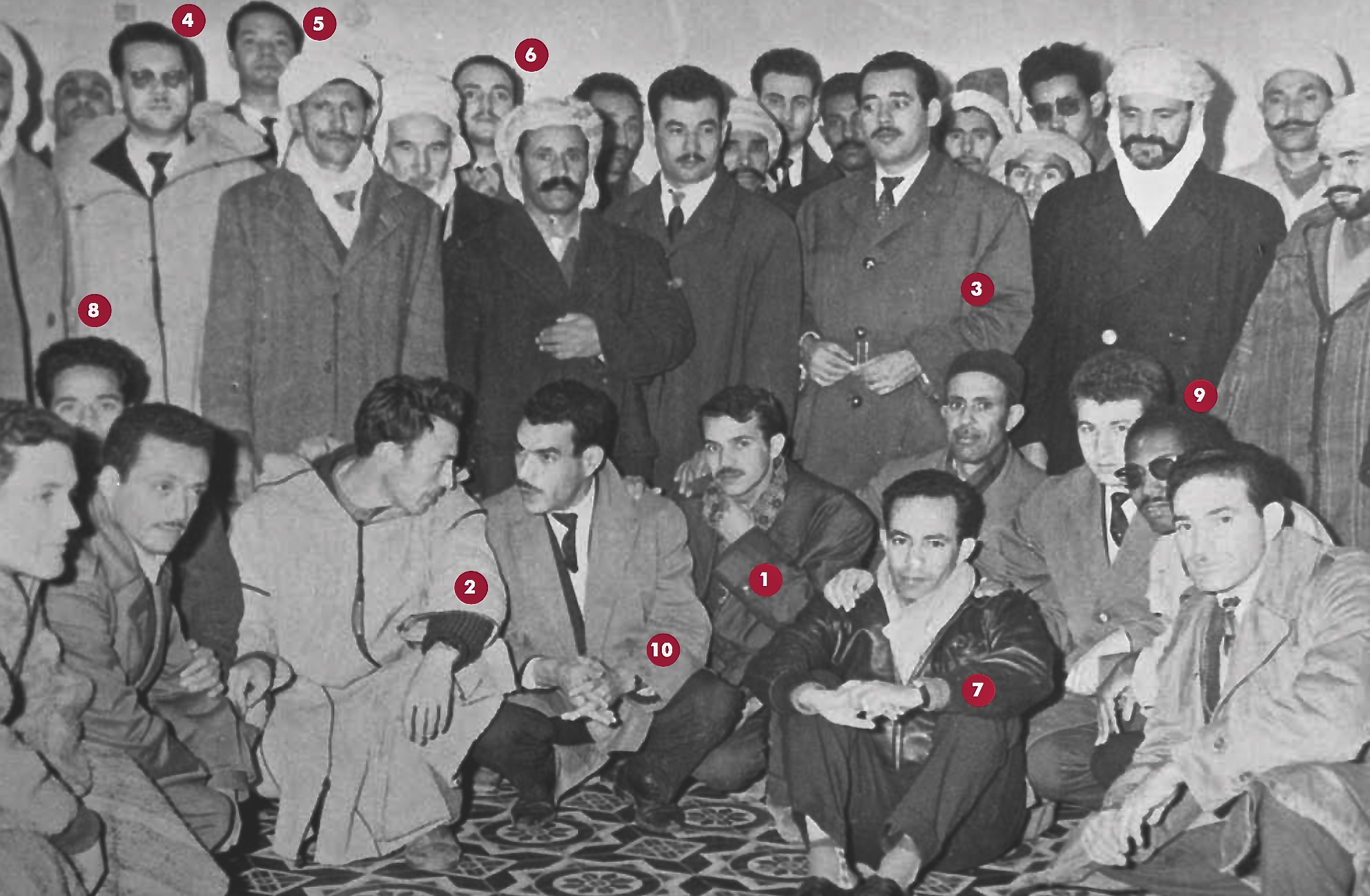
Oujda Group in 1958

In 1956, Bouteflika went to the village of Ouled Amer near Tlemcen and subsequently joined—at the age of 19—the National Liberation Army, which was a military branch of the National Liberation Front. He received his military education at the École des Cadres in Dar El Kebdani, Morocco. In 1957–1958, he was designated a controller of Wilaya V, making reports on the conditions at the Moroccan border and in west Algeria, but later became the administrative secretary of Houari Boumédiène. He became one of his closest collaborators and a core member of his Oujda Group. In 1960, he was assigned to leading the Malian Front in the Algerian south and became known for his nom de guerre of Abdelkader al-Mali, which has survived until today. In 1962, at the arrival of independence, he aligned with Boumédienne and the border armies in support of Ahmed Ben Bella against the Provisional Government of the Algerian Republic.

== Early political career ==
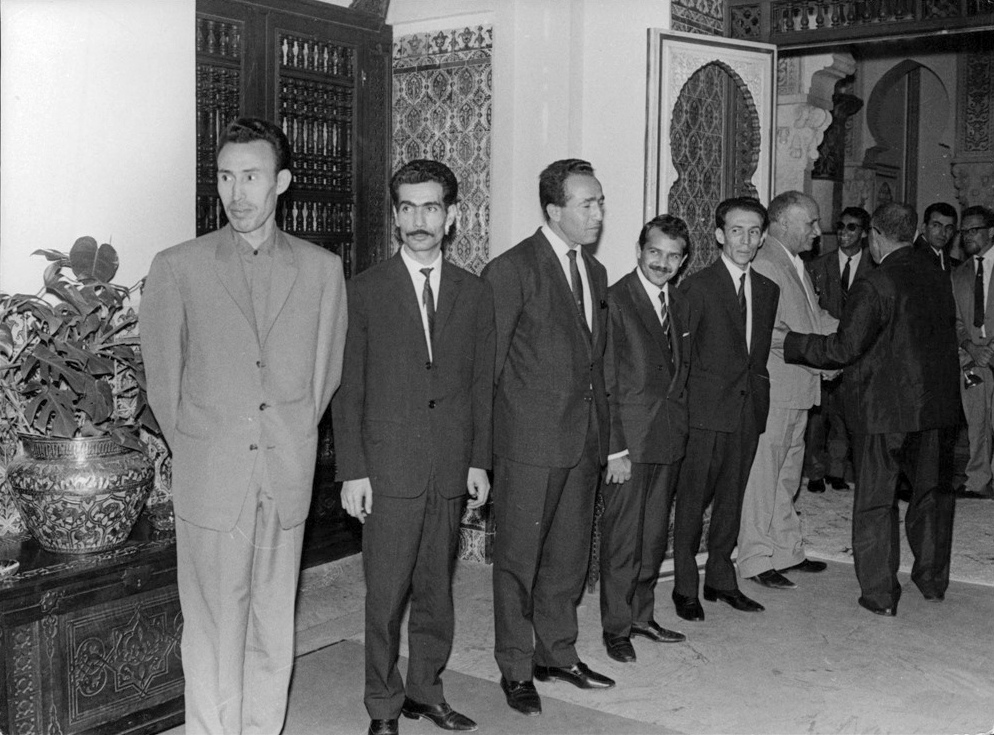
Bouteflika (fourth from left) in 1965

Following independence in 1962, Bouteflika became deputy for Tlemcen in the Constituent Assembly and Minister for Youth and Sport in the government led by Ahmed Ben Bella; the following year, he was appointed Minister for Foreign Affairs.

He was a prime mover in the military coup led by Houari Boumediene that overthrew Ben Bella on 19 June 1965. Bouteflika continued as Minister for Foreign Affairs until the death of President Boumédienne in 1978.

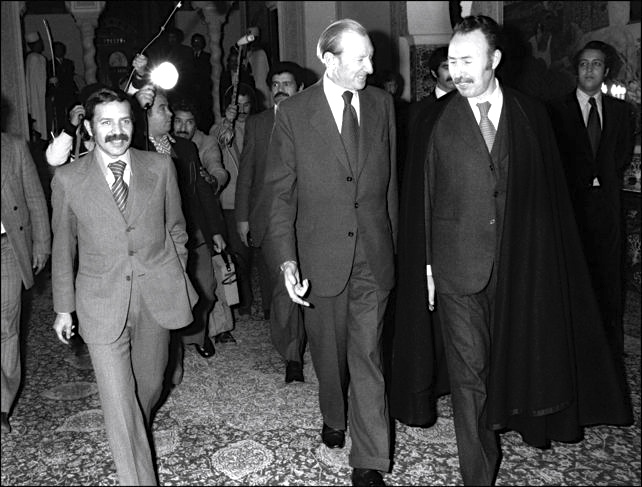
Houari Boumédiène and his young Foreign Minister Abdelaziz Bouteflika, in the company of the UN Secretary General Kurt Waldheim, 1975

He also served as president of the United Nations General Assembly in 1974 and of the seventh special session in 1975, becoming the youngest person to have done so. Algeria at this time was a leader of the Non-Aligned Nations Movement. He had discussions there with Henry Kissinger in the first talks between the United States and Algerian officials since the resumption of diplomatic relations between the two countries.

On 12 November 1974, in his capacity as president of the General Assembly, Bouteflika suspended the then Apartheid government of South Africa from participating in the 29th session of the UN. The suspension was challenged by the US, but upheld by the assembly by a vote of 91 to 22 on 13 November.

In 1981, he was charged with having stolen Algerian embassies' money between 1965 and 1979. On 8 August 1983, Bouteflika was convicted by the Court of Financial Auditors and found guilty of having fraudulently taken 60 million dinars during his diplomatic career. Bouteflika was granted amnesty by President Chadli Bendjedid, his colleagues Senouci and Boudjakdji were jailed. After the amnesty, Bouteflika was given back his diplomatic passport, a villa where he used to live but did not own, and all his debt was erased. He never paid back the money "he reserved for a new foreign affairs ministry's building".

== Succession struggle, corruption and exile ==
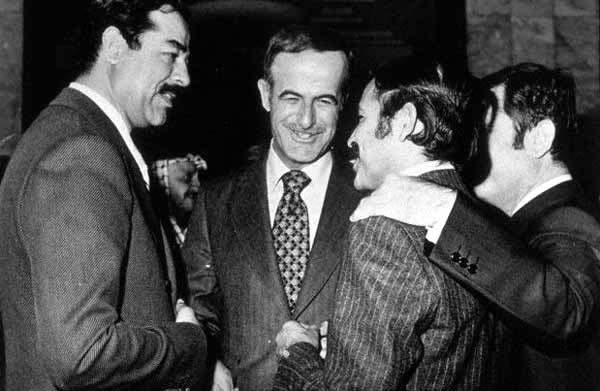
Bouteflika (second from right) at the 1979 Arab League summit in Baghdad, with Saddam Hussein, Hafez al-Assad and Abdul Halim Khaddam

Following Boumédienne's unexpected death in 1978, Bouteflika was seen as one of the two main candidates to succeed the powerful president. Bouteflika was thought to represent the party's "right wing" that was more open to economic reform and rapprochement with the West. Colonel Mohamed Salah Yahiaoui represented the "Boumédiennist" left wing. In the end, the military opted for a compromise candidate, the senior army colonel Chadli Bendjedid. Bouteflika was reassigned the role of Minister of State, but successively lost power as Bendjedid's policies of "de-Boumédiennisation" marginalised the old guard.

In 1981, Bouteflika went into exile in Switzerland fleeing corruption charges. In 1983, he was convicted of corruption. After six years abroad, in 1989, the army brought him back to the Central Committee of the FLN, after the country had entered a troubled period of unrest and disorganised attempts at reform, with power-struggles between Bendjedid and a group of army generals paralysing decision-making.

In 1992, the reform process ended abruptly when the army took power and scrapped elections that were about to bring the fundamentalist Islamic Salvation Front to power. This triggered a civil war that would last throughout the 1990s. During this period, Bouteflika stayed on the sidelines, with little presence in the media and no political role. In January 1994, Bouteflika was said to have refused the army's proposal to succeed the assassinated president, Mohamed Boudiaf; he claimed later that this was because the army would not grant him full control over the armed forces. Instead, General Liamine Zéroual became president.

== Presidency (1999–2019) ==
=== First term ===
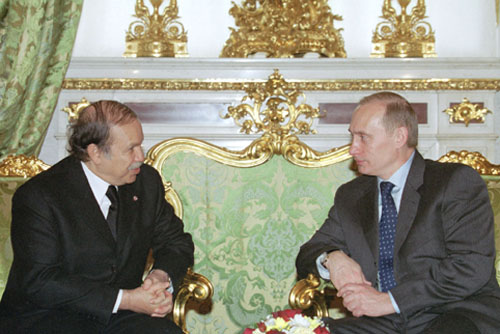
Vladimir Putin and Abdelaziz Bouteflika at the Kremlin, Moscow, on 4 April 2001

In 1999, after Zéroual unexpectedly stepped down and announced early elections, Bouteflika successfully ran for president as an independent candidate, supported by the military. All other candidates withdrew from the election immediately prior to the vote, citing fraud concerns. Bouteflika subsequently organised a referendum on his policies to restore peace and security to Algeria (involving amnesties for Islamist guerrillas) and to test his support among his countrymen after the contested election. He won with 81% of the vote, but this figure was also disputed by opponents.

==== Foreign policy ====
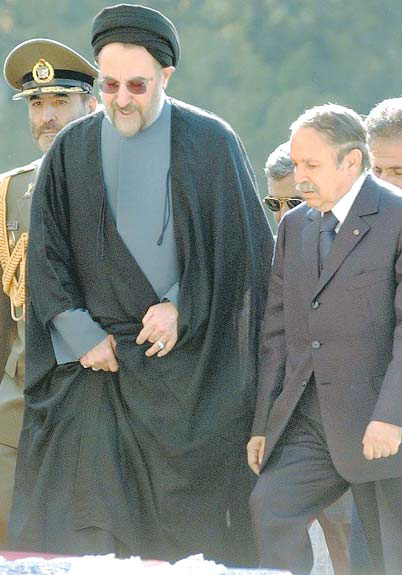
Mohammad Khatami and Abdelaziz Bouteflika in October 2003

Bouteflika presided over the Organisation of African Unity in 2000, secured the Algiers Peace Treaty between Eritrea and Ethiopia, and supported peace efforts in the African Great Lakes region. He also secured a friendship treaty with nearby Spain in 2002, and welcomed president Jacques Chirac of France on a state visit to Algiers in 2003. This was intended as a prelude to the signature of a friendship treaty.

Algeria has been particularly active in African relations, and in mending ties with the West, as well as trying to some extent to resurrect its role in the declining non-Aligned movement. However, it has played a more limited role in Arab politics, its other traditional sphere of interest. Relations with the Kingdom of Morocco remained quite tense, with diplomatic clashes on the issue of the Western Sahara, despite some expectations of a thaw in 1999, which was also the year of King Mohamed VI's accession to the throne in Morocco.

=== Second term ===
On 8 April 2004, Bouteflika was re-elected by an unexpectedly high 85% of the vote in an election that was accepted by Western observers as a free and fair election. This was contested by his rival and former chief of staff Ali Benflis. Several newspapers alleged that the election had not been fair. Frustration was expressed over extensive state control over the broadcast media. The electoral victory was widely seen as a confirmation of Bouteflika's strengthening control over the state, cemented through forcing General Mohammed Lamari to resign as his chief of staff and replacing him "with Ahmed Salah Gaid, his close friend and ally."

Only 17% of people in Kabylia voted in 2004, which represented a significant increase over the violence-ridden legislative elections of 2002. Country-wide, the registered turnout rate was 59%.

==== Reconciliation plan ====
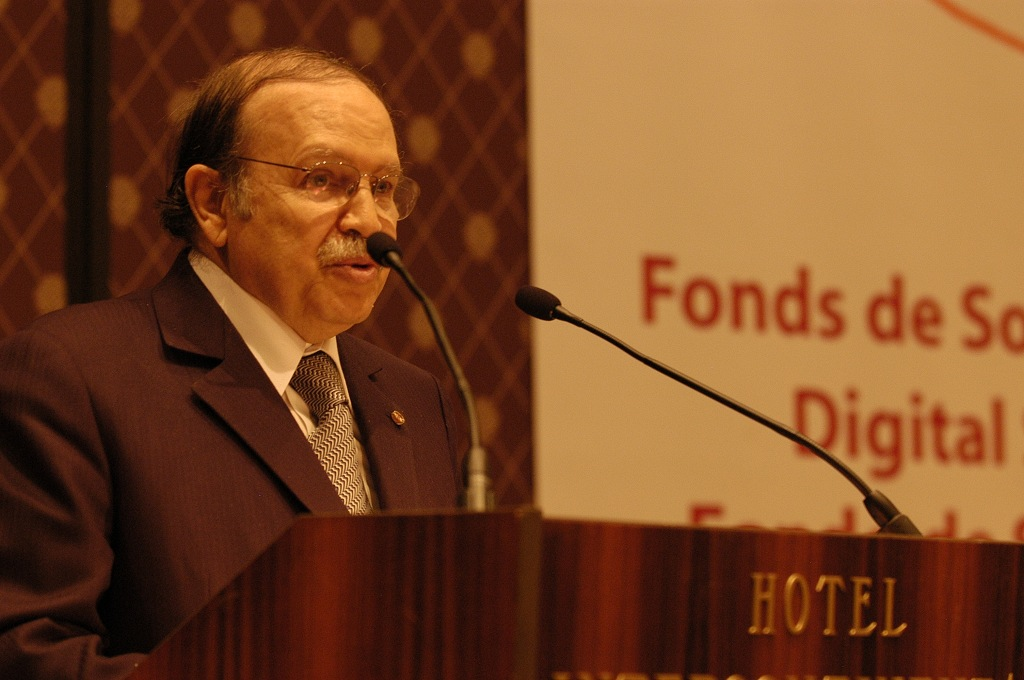
Abdelaziz Bouteflika holding a speech at the inauguration of the Global Digital Solidarity Fund in Geneva, 14 March 2005

During the first year of his second term, Bouteflika held a referendum on his "Charter for Peace and National Reconciliation", inspired by the 1995 "Sant'Egidio Platform" document. The law born of the referendum showed that one of Bouteflika's goals in promoting this blanket amnesty plan was to help Algeria recover its image internationally and to guarantee immunity to institutional actors.

The first year of Bouteflika's second term implemented the Complementary Plan for Economic Growth Support (PCSC), which aimed for the construction of 1 million housing units, the creation of 2 million jobs, the completion of the East–west highway, the completion of the Algiers subway project, the delivery of the new Algiers airport, and other similar large scale infrastructure projects.

The PCSC totaled $60 billion of spending over the five-year period. Bouteflika also aimed to bring down the external debt from $21 billion to $12 billion in the same time. He also obtained from Parliament the reform of the law governing the oil and gas industries, despite initial opposition from the workers unions. However, Bouteflika subsequently stepped back from this position and supported amendments to the hydrocarbon law in 2006, which propose watering down some of the clauses of the 2005 legislation relating to the role of Sonatrach, the state owned oil & gas company, in new developments.

==== Foreign policy ====
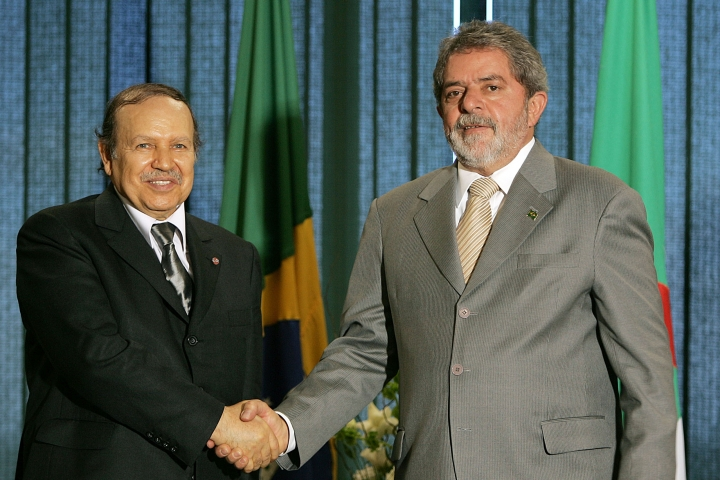
Abdelaziz Bouteflika meets the President of Brazil, Lula da Silva, on a state visit to Brasília, in 2005.

During Bouteflika's second term he was sharply critical of the law—passed after the 2005 French riots—ordering French history school books to teach that French colonisation had positive effects abroad, especially in North Africa. The diplomatic crisis which ensued delayed the signing of a friendship treaty between the two countries.

Ties to Russia were strengthened and Russia agreed to forgive debts if Algeria began buying arms and gave Russian gas companies (Gazprom, Itera, and Lukoil) access to joint fossil-fuel ventures in Algeria.

In 2004 Bouteflika organised the Arab League Summit and became President of the Arab League for one year; however his calls for reform of the League did not gain sufficient support to pass during the Algiers summit.

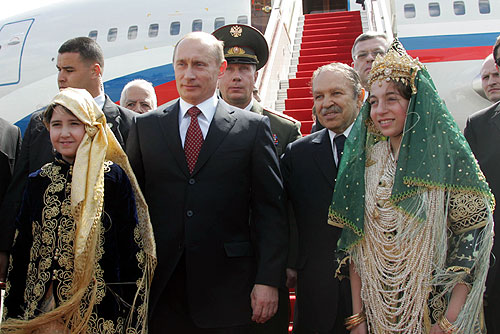
Bouteflika with President of Russia Vladimir Putin at Houari Boumedienne Airport in Algiers on 10 March 2006.

At the March 2005 meeting of Arab leaders, held in Algiers, Bouteflika spoke out strongly against Israel, "The Israelis' continuous killing and refusal of a comprehensive and lasting peace, which the Arab world is calling for, requires from us to fully support the Palestinian people." Despite criticism from the west, specifically the United States, Bouteflika insisted that Arab nations would reform at their own pace.

In November 2005, Bouteflika was admitted to a hospital in France, reportedly for a gastric ulcer hemorrhage, and discharged three weeks later. However, the length of time for which Bouteflika remained virtually incommunicado led to rumours that he was critically ill with stomach cancer. He checked into the hospital again in April 2006. A leaked diplomatic cable confirmed that Bouteflika had developed stomach cancer by the end of 2008.

In sub-Saharan Africa, a major concern of Bouteflika's Algeria had been on-and-off Tuareg rebellions in northern Mali. Algeria has asserted itself forcefully as mediator in the conflict, perhaps underlining its growing regional influence. Compromise peace agreements were reached in 2007 and 2008, both mediated by Algiers.

On 16 July 2009, President of Vietnam Nguyễn Minh Triết, met with Bouteflika on the sidelines of the 15th Non-Aligned Movement (NAM) summit in Egypt. President Triet and Bouteflika agreed that the two countries still have great potential for development of political and trade relations. Triet praised the Algerian government for creating favourable conditions for the Vietnam Oil and Gas Group to invest in oil and gas exploration and exploitation in Algeria.

==== Constitutional amendment for a third term ====
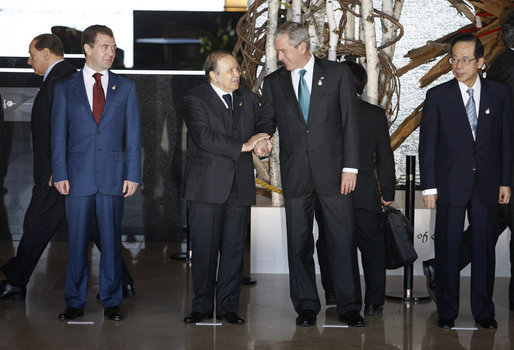
Bouteflika with U.S. President George W. Bush, Russian President Dmitriy Medvedev, and Japanese Prime Minister Yasuo Fukuda, Tōyako Town, on 7 July 2008.

In 2006, Bouteflika appointed a new Prime Minister, Abdelaziz Belkhadem. Belkhadem then announced plans that violate the Algerian Constitution to allow the President to run for office indefinitely and increase his powers. This was widely regarded as aimed to let Bouteflika run for president for a third term. In 2008, Belkhadem was shifted out of the premiership and his predecessor Ahmed Ouyahia brought in, having also come out in favor of the constitutional amendment.

The Council of Ministers announced on 3 November 2008 that the planned constitutional revision proposal would remove the presidential term limit previously included in Article 74. The People's National Assembly endorsed the removal of the term limit on 12 November 2008; only the Rally for Culture and Democracy (RCD) voted against its removal.

=== Third term ===
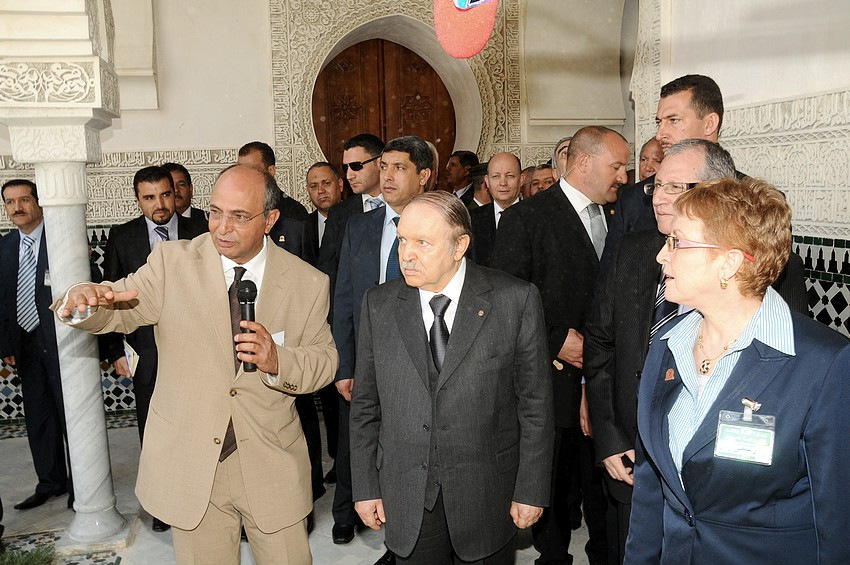
Abdelaziz Bouteflika in Tlemcen, 24 May 2011

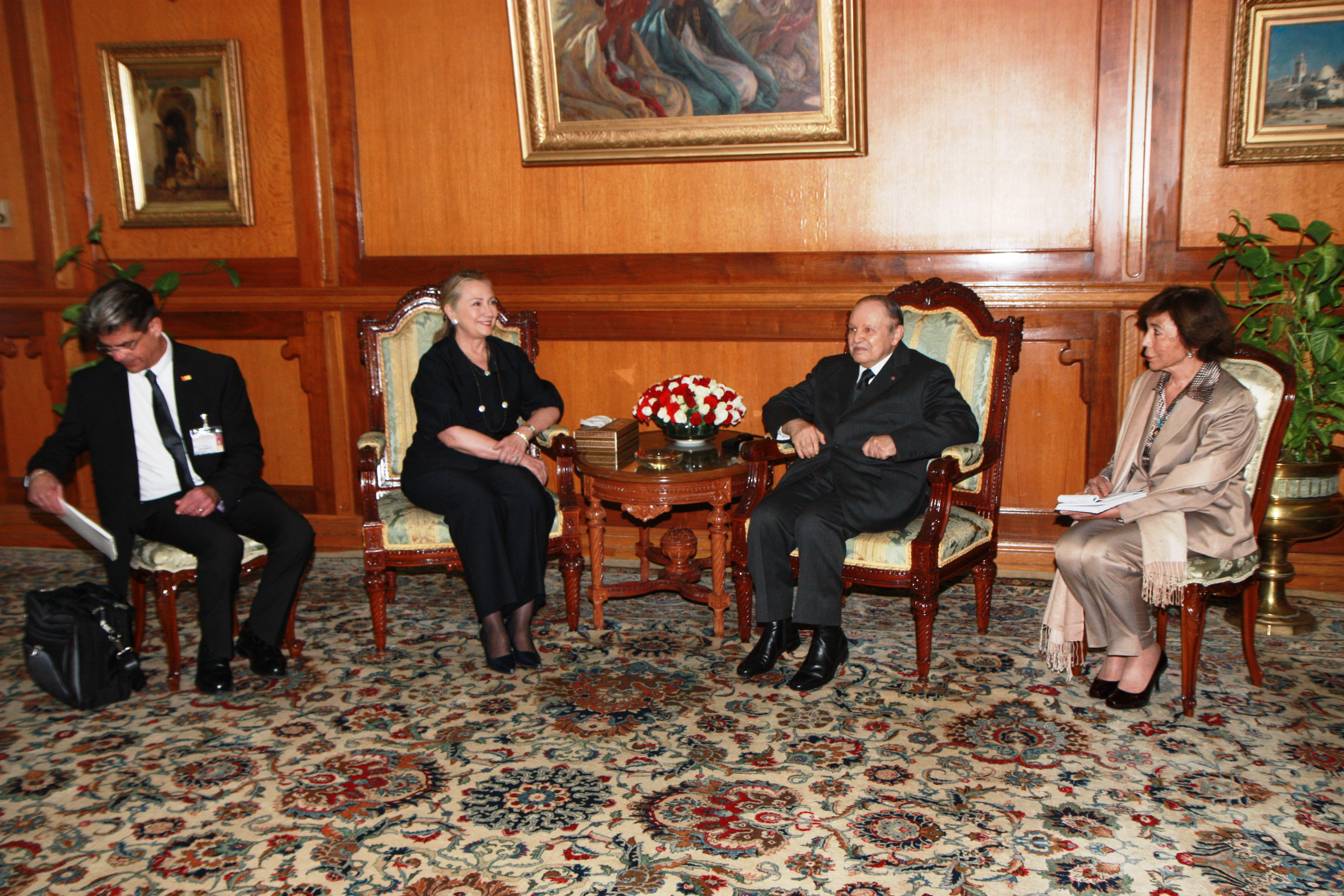
Bouteflika with U.S. Secretary of State Hillary Clinton, Algiers, in 2012

Following the constitutional amendment allowing him to run for a third term, on 12 February 2009, Bouteflika announced his independent candidacy in the 2009 presidential election. On 10 April 2009, it was announced that Bouteflika had won the election with 90.24% of the vote, on a turnout of 74%, thereby obtaining a new five-year term. Several opposition parties had boycotted the election, with the opposition Socialist Forces Front citing a "tsunami of massive fraud".

==== 2010–2012 Algerian protests ====
In 2010, journalists gathered to demonstrate for press freedom and against Bouteflika's self-appointed role as editor-in-chief of Algeria's state television station. In February 2011, the government rescinded the state of emergency that had been in place since 1992 but still banned all protest gatherings and demonstrations. However, in April 2011, over 2,000 protesters defied an official ban and took to the streets of Algiers, clashing with police forces. Protesters noted that they were inspired by the recent Egyptian revolution, and that Algeria was a police state and "corrupt to the bone".

==== Stroke ====
In 2013, Bouteflika had a debilitating stroke. A journalist, Hichem Aboud, was pursued for "threatening national security, territorial integrity, and normal management of the Republic's institutions" and the newspapers for which he wrote were censored, because he wrote that the President had returned from Val-de-Grâce in a "comatose state" and had characterized his brother Saïd Bouteflika as the puppet-master running the administration.

=== Fourth term ===
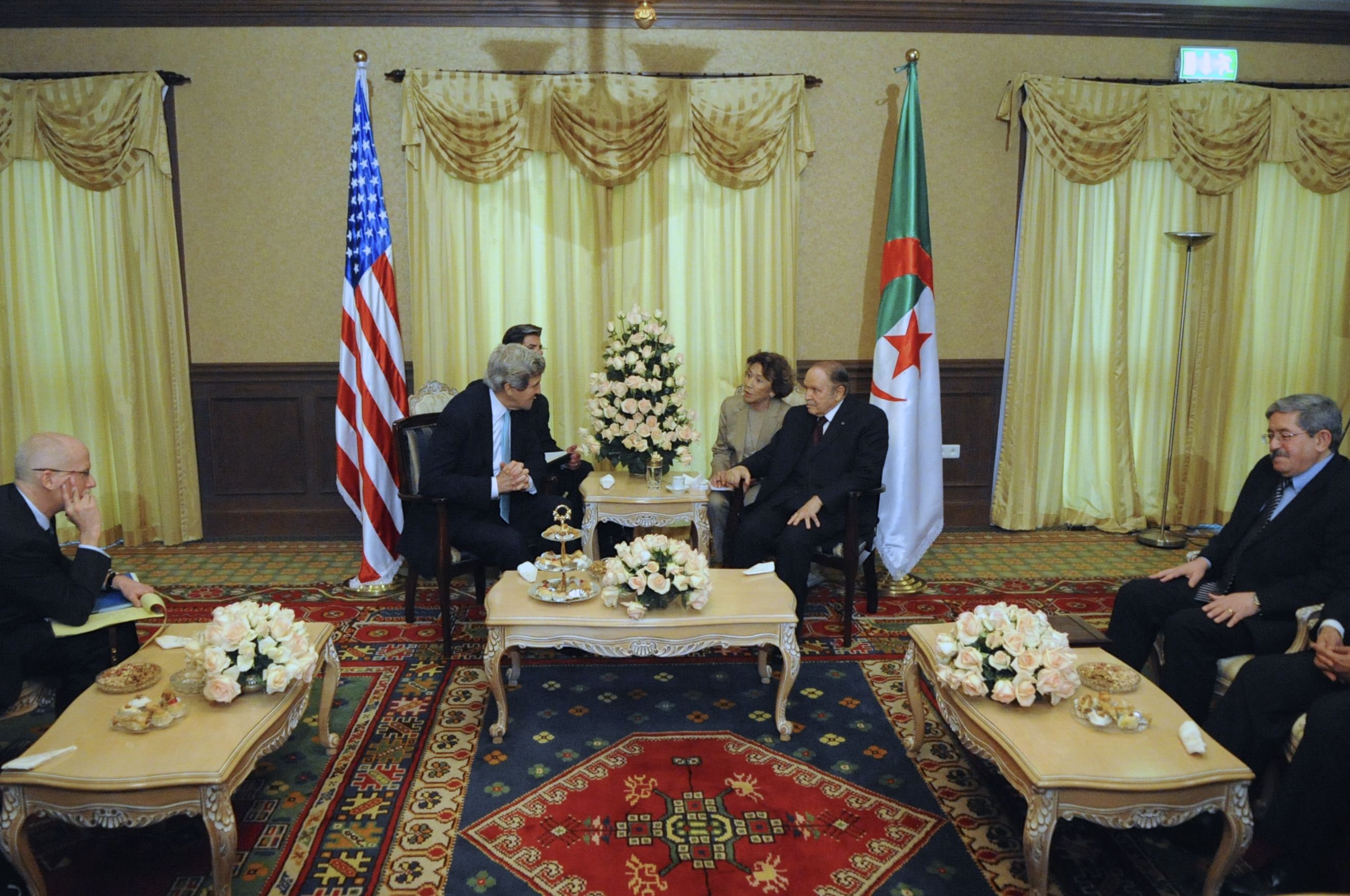
Bouteflika with U.S. Secretary of State John Kerry, Algiers, in 2014

In March 2014, Bouteflika announced that he would run for a fourth term. He met the electoral law requiring a candidate to collect over 60,000 signatures from supporters in 25 provinces. On 18 April 2014, he was re-elected with 81% of the vote, while Benflis was second placed with 12.18%. The turnout was 51.7%, down from the 75% turnout in 2009. Several opposition parties boycotted the election again, resulting in allegations of fraud.

Bouteflika cabled his congratulations to freshly-reelected Bashar al-Assad on 19 April 2014. Bouteflika was admitted to a clinic at Grenoble in France in November 2014. In November 2016, he was hospitalized in France for medical checks.

In March 2016, the foreign ministers of the Arab League voted to declare Hezbollah a terrorist organization. Algeria, Lebanon, Syria, and Iraq voted to reject the motion, and Bouteflika's adviser stated Algeria's position was in line with the president's "principle of non-interference".

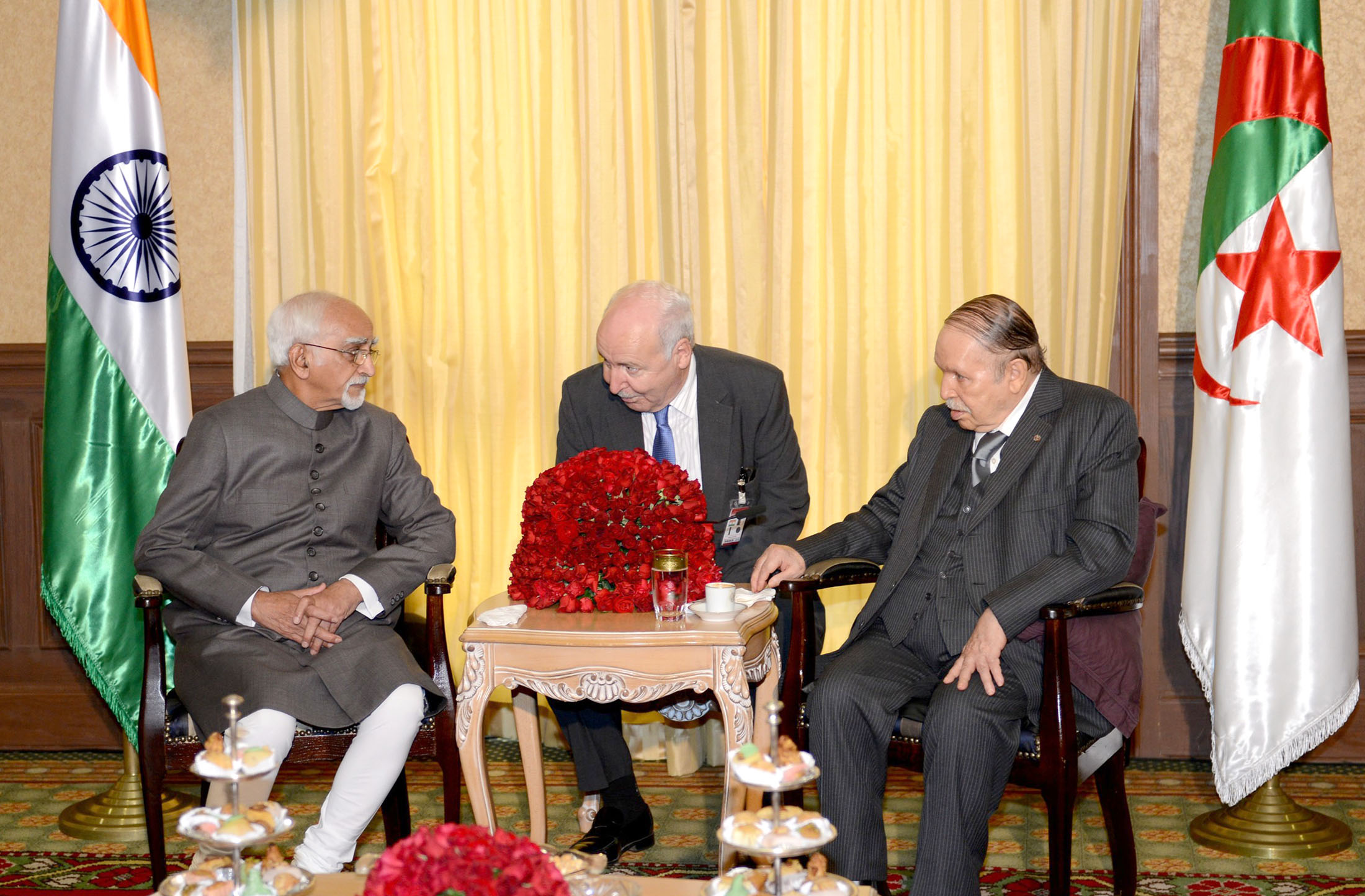
Mohamad Hamid Ansari with Abdelaziz Bouteflika in Algiers, October 19, 2016

On 20 February 2017, the German Chancellor Angela Merkel canceled her trip to Algeria an hour before takeoff, reportedly because Bouteflika had severe bronchitis.

In June 2017, Bouteflika made a rare, and brief, appearance on Algerian state television presiding over a cabinet meeting with his new government. In a written statement, he ordered the government to reduce imports, curb spending, and be wary of foreign debt. He called for banking sector reform and more investment in renewable energy and "unconventional fossil hydrocarbons". Bouteflika was reliant on a wheelchair and had not given a speech in public since 2014 due to aphasia following his stroke. That same year, he made his final public appearance while unveiling a new metro station and the newly renovated Ketchaoua Mosque in Algiers.

During his final term as president, Bouteflika was usually not been seen in public for more than two years, and several of his close associates had not seen him for more than one year. It was alleged that he could hardly speak and communicated by letter with his ministers.

=== Criticism ===
Bouteflika's presidency was marred by allegations of fraud and vote-tampering in elections. He had already been convicted in 1983 of corruption. Per Suisse Secrets, he held an account during much of his presidency with a maximum balance worth over 1.4 million Swiss francs ($1.1 million) along with other family members.

== Candidacy for fifth term, protests, and resignation ==
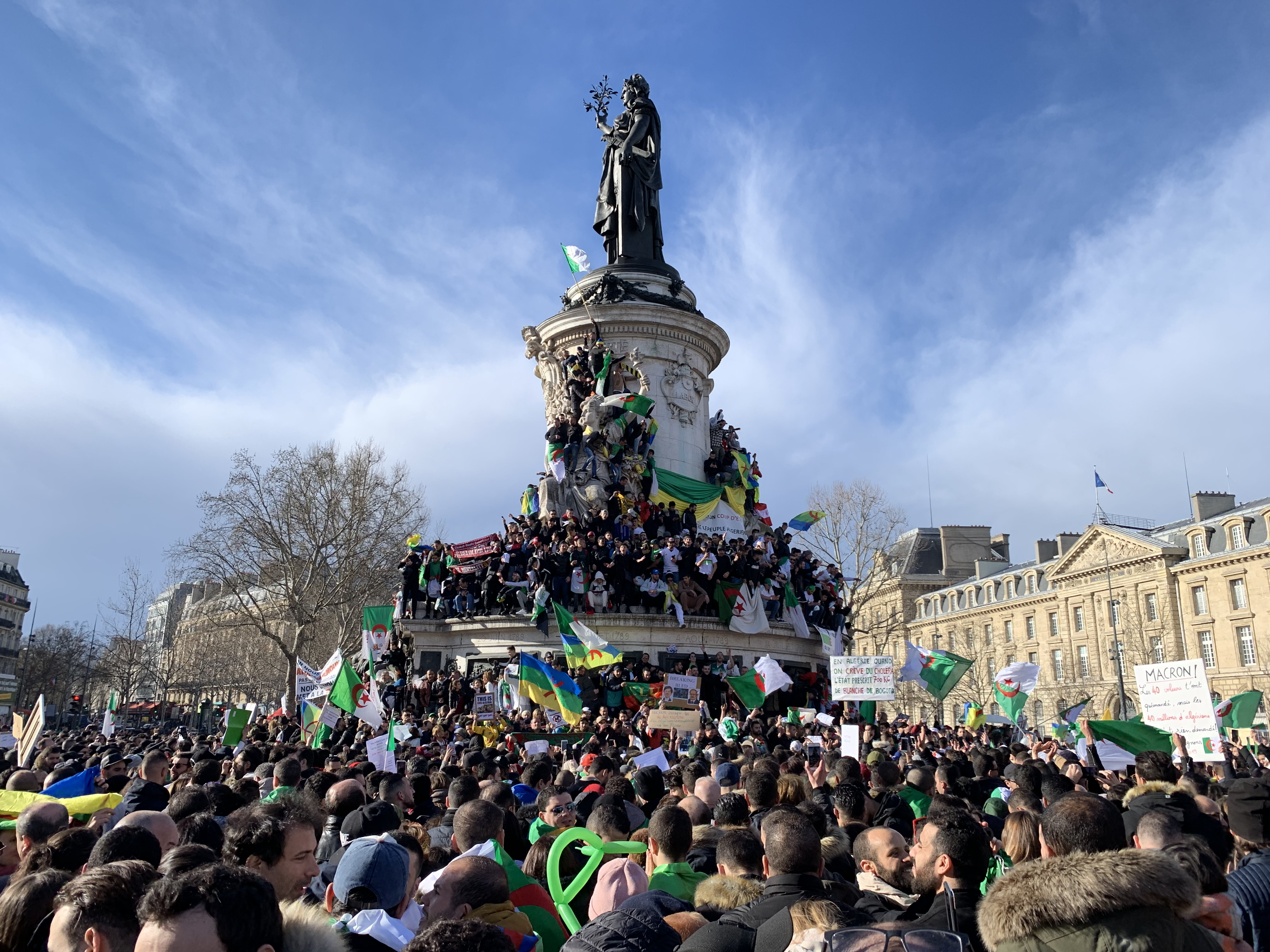
Anti-Bouteflika protest by Algerians in Paris on 17 March 2019

On 10 February 2019, a press release signed by the long-ailing Bouteflika announcing he would seek a fifth consecutive term provoked widespread discontent. Youth protesters demanded his picture be removed from city halls in Kenchela and Annaba in the days before the national demonstrations on 22 February, organized via social media. Those in Algiers, where street protests are illegal, were the biggest in nearly 18 years. Protesters ripped down a giant poster of Bouteflika from the landmark Algiers central post office.

On 11 March 2019, after sustained protests, Bouteflika announced that he would not seek a new term. However, his withdrawal from the elections did not calm protesters. On 31 March 2019, Bouteflika along with the Prime Minister Noureddine Bedoui who had taken office 20 days earlier, formed a 27-member cabinet with only 6 of the appointees being retained from the outgoing president's administration. The next day, Bouteflika announced that he would resign by 28 April 2019. Acceding to demands by army chief of staff Ahmed Gaid Salah, he ultimately resigned a day later, on 2 April 2019.

Following his resignation, Bouteflika resumed his reclusiveness and made no public appearances due to failing health. Bouteflika spent his final years in a medicalised state residence in Zéralda, a suburb of Algiers. He also had a private residence in El Biar.

== Death ==
Bouteflika died following a cardiac arrest at his home in Zéralda on 17 September 2021, at the age of 84. His death was announced by a statement from the office of President Abdelmadjid Tebboune. He had been in failing health since his stroke in 2013. Tebboune declared three days of national mourning after his death. He was buried at the El Alia Cemetery on 19 September in a subdued ceremony.

== Awards and honours ==
=== Awards ===
- In 2004 he received Olympic Order presented by Jacques Rogge, President of the International Olympic Committee.

=== State honours ===
Ribbon bar	Country	Honour	Date
	Algeria	Grand Collar of the National Order of Merit	27 April 1999 (ex-officio)
	Italy	Knight Grand Cross with Collar Order of Merit of the Italian Republic	15 November 1999
	Cuba	Medal of the Order of José Martí	6 May 2001
	Spain	Collar of the Order of Civil Merit	5 October 2002
	Portugal	Grand Collar of the Order of Prince Henry	14 January 2003
	Austria	Grand Star of the Decoration of Honour for Services to the Republic of Austria	17 June 2003
	Peru	Grand Cross with Diamonds of the Order of the Sun of Peru	18 May 2005
	Brazil	Grand Collar of the Order of the Southern Cross	2 February 2006
	South Korea	Grand Cross of the Grand Order of Mugunghwa	11 March 2006
	Russia	Medal of the Order of Friendship	2006
	Hungary	Grand Cross with Chain of the Order of Merit of the Republic of Hungary	30 May 2007
	Venezuela	Grand Cross of the Order of Francisco de Miranda	2009
	Palestine	Recipient of the Order of the Star of Palestine	22 December 2014
Order of the Republic (Tunisia) - ribbon bar	Tunisia	Grand Cordon of the Order of the Republic	2015
	Mali	Grand Cross of the National Order of Mali	31 August 2015
	Malta	Honorary Companions of Honour with Collar of the National Order of Merit	20 January 2016
	Serbia	Grand Cross of the Order of the Republic of Serbia	5 February 2016

== Notes ==
Diplomatic posts
Preceded by Leopoldo Benites	President of the United Nations General Assembly; 1974–1975	Succeeded by Gaston Thorn
Preceded by Blaise Compaoré	Chairperson of the Organisation of African Unity; 1999–2000	Succeeded by Gnassingbé Eyadéma
Political offices
Preceded by Liamine Zéroual	President of Algeria; 1999–2019	Succeeded by Abdelkader Bensalah; Acting Head of State
