= List of heads of state of Algeria =

Presidential Standard of Algeria

This is a list of heads of state of Algeria since the establishment of the Provisional Government of the Algerian Republic (GPRA) in exile in Cairo, Egypt in 1958, during the Algerian War, through independence in 1962, to the present.

A total of five individuals have served as President of Algeria (excluding two Presidents of the GPRA and four interim heads of state). Among them, Houari Boumédiène and Liamine Zéroual are notable for having served both as interim heads of state and as President of Algeria.

== Titles ==
- 1958–1962: President of the Provisional Government of the Algerian Republic
- 1962 : Chairman of the Provisional Executive
- 1962–1963: President of the National Constituent Assembly
- 1963–1965: President of the Republic
- 1965–1976: Chairman of the Revolutionary Council
- 1976–1992: President of the Republic
- 1992–1994: Chairman of the High Council of State
- 1994–1995: State President
- 1995–present: President of the Republic

== List of officeholders ==
Political parties

National Liberation Front
National Rally for Democracy

Other factions

Military
Independent

Status

Denotes Acting Heads of State

No.	Portrait	Name (Birth–Death)	Elected	Term of office			Political party
No.	Portrait	Name (Birth–Death)	Elected	Took office	Left office	Duration	Political party
—		Ferhat Abbas فرحات عباس (1899–1985) (Note: as President of the Provisional Government of the Algerian Republic.)	—	19 September 1958	9 August 1961	2 years, 324 days	National Liberation Front
—		Benyoucef Benkhedda بن يوسف بن خدة (1920–2003)	—	9 August 1961	27 September 1962	1 year, 49 days	National Liberation Front
—		Abderrahmane Farès عبدالرحمن فارس (1911–1991) (Note: as Chairman of the Provisional Executive.)	—	13 April 1962	25 September 1962	165 days	National Liberation Front
—		Ferhat Abbas فرحات عباس (1899–1985) (Note: as President of the National Constituent Assembly.)	—	25 September 1962	15 September 1963	355 days	National Liberation Front
1		Ahmed Ben Bella أحمد بن بلّة (1916–2012)	1963	15 September 1963	19 June 1965 (Deposed)	1 year, 277 days	National Liberation Front
—	Revolutionary Council مجلس الثورة; Chairman: Colonel Houari Boumédiène هواري بومدين (1932–1978)		—	19 June 1965	10 December 1976	11 years, 174 days	Military
2		Houari Boumédiène هواري بومدين (1932–1978)	1976	10 December 1976	27 December 1978 (Died in office)	2 years, 17 days	National Liberation Front
—		Rabah Bitat رابح بيطاط (1925–2000)	—	27 December 1978	9 February 1979	44 days	National Liberation Front
3		Chadli Bendjedid شاذلي بن جديد (1929–2012)	1979; 1984; 1988	9 February 1979	11 January 1992 (Resigned) (Note: Forced to resign by the military, at the beginning of the Algerian Civil War.)	12 years, 336 days	National Liberation Front
—		Abdelmalek Benhabyles عبد المالك بن حبيلس (1921–2018)	—	11 January 1992	14 January 1992	3 days	National Liberation Front
4		Mohamed Boudiaf محمد بوضياف (1919–1992) (Note: as Chairman of the High Council of State.)	—	14 January 1992	29 June 1992 (Assassinated)	167 days	Independent
5		Ali Kafi علي حسين كافي (1928–2013)	—	2 July 1992	31 January 1994	1 year, 213 days	National Liberation Front
6		Liamine Zéroual اليمين زروال (1941–2026) (Note: as State President until 27 November 1995, then as President of the Republic until 27 April 1999.)	1995	31 January 1994	27 April 1999	5 years, 86 days	Independent (Note: Supported by: RND (1997–1999))
7		Abdelaziz Bouteflika عبد العزيز بوتفليقة (1937–2021)	1999; 2004; 2009; 2014	27 April 1999	2 April 2019 (Resigned)	19 years, 340 days	Independent (Note: Supported by: FLN (1999) RND and MSP (2004) FLN (2009) FLN (2014))
—		Abdelkader Bensalah عبد القـادر بن صالح (1941–2021)	—	9 April 2019	19 December 2019	254 days	Independent
8		Abdelmadjid Tebboune عبد المجيد تبون (born 1945)	2019; 2024	19 December 2019	Incumbent	6 years, 304 days	Independent

For details of the post of President of Algeria see: President of Algeria

== Timeline ==
This is a graphical lifespan timeline of the heads of state of Algeria. They are listed in order of first assuming office.

The following chart lists heads of state by lifespan (living heads of state on the green line), with the years outside of their tenure in beige. Heads of state with an unknown birth date or death date are shown with only their tenure or their earlier or later life.

The following chart shows heads of state by their age (living heads of state in green), with the years of their tenure in blue. Heads of state with an unknown birth or death date are excluded. The vertical black line at 40 years indicates the minimum age to be president as of now.

== See also ==
- List of French governors of Algeria
- President of Algeria
- Prime Minister of Algeria
  - List of heads of government of Algeria
