= M'hamed Yala =

Algerian politician

M'hamed Hadj Yala
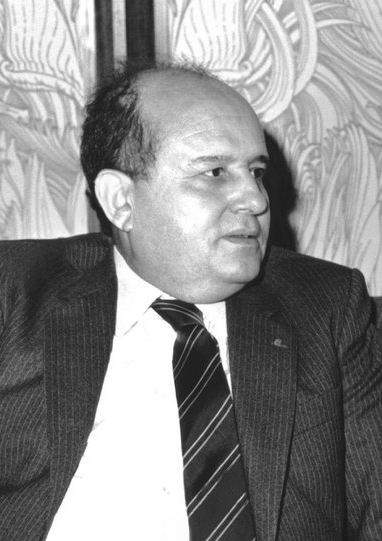

Minister of the Interior of Algeria
- In office January 12, 1982 – June 13, 1987
- President: Chadli Bendjedid
- Prime Minister: Mohamed Ben Ahmed Abdelghani; Abdelhamid Brahimi
- Preceded by: Boualem Benhamouda
- Succeeded by: El Hadi Khediri

Minister of Finance of Algeria
- In office March 8, 1979 – January 12, 1982
- President: Chadli Bendjedid
- Prime Minister: Mohamed Ben Ahmed Abdelghani
- Preceded by: Mohamed al-Siddiq ben Yahya
- Succeeded by: Boualem Benhamouda

5th wali of Algiers Province
- In office July 30, 1965 – August 18, 1970
- Preceded by: Rabah Bouaziz
- Succeeded by: Slimane Hoffman

Personal details
- Born: December 23, 1927 Tifra, Bejaia Province, French Algeria (now Algeria)
- Died: September 29, 2021 (aged 94)
- Party: FLN

M'hamed Hadj Yala (Arabic: محمد يعلى), also known as El Hadj Yala, was an Algerian politician who served in various positions in the Provisional Government of the Algerian Republic and Algeria, including as the Minister of Commerce, Finance, and the Interior and as ambassadors to the USSR and China.

== Biography ==
Yala was born on December 23, 1927, in to a Berber family in Tifra, Béjaïa Province, French Algeria. His first acts in politics began in the early 1950s as a leader of the Algerian Muslim Scouts. In 1954, at the outbreak of the Algerian War, he became the political leader in the FLN in Wilaya III. Yala then served as the FLN's ambassador to Tunis and Cairo, and then Germany. In 1958, Yala began serving in socialist countries, first as deputy ambassador of the FLN to Belgrade and then ambassador in Prague.

In 1964, Yala served as ambassador of the Provisional Government of the Algerian Republic (GPRA) to China. In 1965, he served as the wali of Algiers Province following the 1965 Algerian coup d'état, and was transferred to a position as wali of Constantine Province on August 18, 1970, with Slimane Hoffman taking over in Algiers. As wali of Constantine, Yala joined President Houari Boumédiène in a 1974 trip to China with other ministers. That same year, he became the advisor to Boumediene. Between 1977 and 1979, Yala served as the Algerian Minister of Commerce.

Yala served as Minister of Finance from 1979 to 1982, speaking at the 1979 International Monetary Fund fund policy discussions and attending the North–South Summit in Cancun, Mexico in 1981. In 1982, during a foreign debt crisis in Algeria, President Chadli Bendjedid appointed five Berbers to various positions, with Yala being appointed to the Minister of the Interior. In 1987, Yala was appointed as ambassador to the Soviet Union, and he resigned in 1988.

Yala died on September 29, 2021, at the age of 94. Algerian President Abdelmadjid Tebboune expressed his condolences.
