= Ahmed Taleb Ibrahimi =

Algerian politician (1932–2025)

- أحمد طالب الإبراهيمي
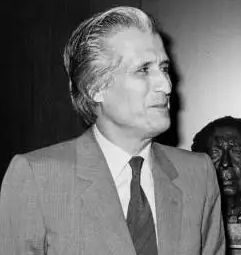

Minister of Foreign Affairs of Algeria
- In office 1982–1988
- President: Chadli Bendjedid
- Prime Minister: Mohd. Ben Ahmed Abdelghani; Abdelhamid Brahimi
- Preceded by: Mohammed Seddik Benyahia
- Succeeded by: Boualem Bessaïh

Minister Counselor of the President of Algeria
- In office 1977–1982

Minister of Information and Culture of Algeria
- In office 1970–1977

Minister of National Education of Algeria
- In office 1965–1970

Personal details
- Born: 5 January 1932 Setif, French Algeria
- Died: 5 October 2025 (aged 93)
- Party: National Liberation Front (FLN)
- Spouse: Souad Taleb Ibrahimi
- Children: 2
- Education: University of Paris

Ahmed Taleb Ibrahimi (Arabic: أحمد طالب الإبراهيمي; 5 January 1932 – 5 October 2025) was an Algerian politician and intellectual.

Taleb Ibrahimi was the son of Islamic theologian and renowned scholar Bachir Ibrahimi, and served in multiple ministerial roles in Algeria from the 1960s until the late 1980s. A staunch anti-colonialist and proponent of Arab heritage through his writings and his actions, Dr. Ibrahimi was jailed by the French authorities as a militant of the FLN Party. He ran for president in 1999 but withdrew from the race along with all other opposition candidates hours before voting commenced, claiming electoral fraud by the army. In 2004, his proposed candidacy was disqualified because of alleged links with the proscribed Islamic Salvation Front (FIS). His platform included moderate Islamism and adherence to free-market economics.

== Early years ==
Ahmed Taleb Ibrahimi was born on 5 January 1932, in the eastern city of Setif, 220 miles from the Algerian capital of Algiers. He grew up in a family of modest means, which was yet in contrast intellectually and spiritually wealthy. His father, Sheikh Bachir Ibrahimi, a renowned scholar, was already fighting French colonialism not with a military weapon but with his sharp pen and voice. He was Deputy President and later President of the “Association of the Oulemaa”, whose main objective was to build schools in order to inform and educate the populace, raise awareness about Arabic heritage and a moderate Islam, and free Algeria from the shackles of French colonialism. Because of his militant activities, the French occupiers extradited him numerous times, and put him under house arrest for “spreading subversion.” This in turn obliged the family to be scattered around the country.

As a child and an adolescent, Ahmed quickly acquired from his father a precious knowledge and a general culture which he would later rely and build upon. In the late 1940s, he passed his Baccalaureate exam and went on to study medicine. In 1954 he moved to Paris to further his medical education, and after that he earned a degree in Hematology, interning at a few Parisian hospitals.

== French prison until Algerian independence ==
Whilst Ahmed completed his medical specialty, he was simultaneously a militant and an advocate for Algerian independence. With some other militants, he launched in 1952 "Le Jeune Musulman", a newspaper addressing the needs of the young generation in retrieving its identity after years of colonization. He was elected as the 1st president of l'UGEMA (Union Générale des étudiants Musulmans Algériens). Later he was appointed a member of "Fédération de France", the FLN representation in France. No wonder that in February 1957 he was arrested and imprisoned in Paris. During almost 5 years in French prisons, he developed friendship in so far as brotherhood with other inmates who will later become the elite of a free Algeria. In September 1961 he was liberated and spent a few months overseas, among other places, in Switzerland, Tunisia, and Morocco to physically heal from illness caused by years of incarceration.

== Algerian doctor ==
In 1962 he pursued his career as a doctor in the main hospital of Algiers. After the independence, in July 1962, Ahmed continued his work of reforming, renovating the hospital, teaching the next generation of Algerian doctors, and learning from foreign professors who chose to remain in independent Algeria. Moreover, during the next three years, he received many enticing offers to be Ambassador, and had other senior government positions offered to him which he refused because he wanted to stay with his family which he missed from his years of war and separation. Even the-then first president of Algeria, Ahmed Ben Bella, made several overtures to Ahmed to work with him. Ahmed politely declined the offer and made it clear that he wished to continue practicing medicine rather than engage in Politics. In addition, Ahmed had the financial responsibility to find housing for his parents and ailing sister, and share his meager salary with them.

The family was hard-pressed to find a place to live in an independent Algeria. The then President Benbella was hostile to Sheikh Bachir and his son Ahmed because the latter did not agree with his policies in general, and the extreme socialism that the President adopted in particular.

== Torture under Benbella ==
Following the orders of President Benbella, Ahmed was arrested and jailed in Algerian prisons in July 1964. These horrible 8 months were considerably worse than the 5 years he spent in French prisons. Indeed, during this time he was repeatedly tortured in an egregious manner by some of his countrymen. It is worthwhile to remind the reader that during the Algerian revolution (1954–1962), the International Community strongly condemned France for torturing Algerians. Alas, even after Algeria became independent, some Algerians themselves, with President Benbella at the helm perpetuated this barbaric practice against Ahmrd and his jail companions. In fact, it is alarmingly sickening that although Benbella and Ahmed were amongst many inmates within the same French prison in the late 1950s, becoming by default “brothers in arms”, Benbella later became president, executed some of his companions, and wished to do the same with Ahmed. The latter was lucky enough that the-then Defense Minister Houari Boumediene intervened to spare him. What was then the “crime” of Ahmed Taleb-Ibrahimi? He simply did not agree with the policies and direction of Benbella, and refused to work with him.

In February 1965, Ahmed was released weakened by the excruciating episode he endured. He traveled to Switzerland to heal emotionally and physically with some of the other inmates who were lucky to make it out alive from having been under Benbella’s heinous torture. Upon his return, he resumed work in the hospital and strenuously endeavored to enjoy and make up the missed moments with his family. Three months later Cheikh Bachir died on 20 May 1965. And a month later, on 19 June 1965, Benbella was overthrown via a bloodless coup d'etat by Defense Minister Houari Boumediene who became President of Algeria.

== Minister under Boumediene ==
In 1965 President Boumediene offered Ahmed the position of Minister of Education. The latter went on a campaign of reforming the Algerian school and its educational system. In 1970, Boumediene reshuffled his cabinet, and appointed Ahmed Minister of Information and Culture until April 1977. By this date, the President chose to have Ahmed even closer to him, and created the position of “Minister Advisor to the President.” Throughout the years, it was clear that Ahmed earned the trust and confidence of the President.

== Death ==
Taleb Ibrahimi died on 5 October 2025, at the age of 93.

== Bibliography ==
- Taleb-Ibrahimi, Ahmed. Letters From Prison. English Translation (c) 1988, 1st edition (c)1966, Allied Publishers Private Limited, Ahmedabad
- Taleb-Ibrahimi, Ahmed. Memoires d’un Algerien Tome 1, Reves et Epreuves (1932–1965).” 2006
- Taleb-Ibrahimi, Ahmed. Memoires d’un Algerien Tome 2, La passion de Batir (1965–1978).” 2008.
