= Boualem Benhamouda =

Algerian politician

Secretary-General of the FLN
- In office January 19, 1996 – September 19, 2001
- Preceded by: Abdelhamid Mehri
- Succeeded by: Ali Benflis

Minister of Finance of Algeria
- In office January 12, 1982 – February 18, 1986
- President: Chadli Bendjedid
- Prime Minister: Mohamed Ben Ahmed Abdelghani
- Preceded by: M'hamed Yala
- Succeeded by: Abdelaziz Khellef

Minister of the Interior of Algeria
- In office July 15, 1980 – January 12, 1982
- Preceded by: Mohamed Ben Ahmed Abdelghani
- Succeeded by: M'hamed Yala

Personal details
- Born: March 8, 1933 (age 93) Cherchell, Algeria
- Party: FLN

Military service
- Battles/wars: Algerian War

Boualem Benhamouda is an Algerian politician who served as Secretary General of the FLN from 1996 to 2001, Minister of Finance from 1982 to 1986, and Minister of the Interior from 1980 to 1982.

== Biography ==
Benhamouda was born on March 8, 1933 in Cherchell, Algeria. As a young man, he was a member of the General Union of Algerian Muslim Students and participated in the 1956 strike before joining the FLN. He studied law at the University of Algiers, but left to fight in the FLN where he was wounded in 1957. He completed a doctorate in law in 1971. Benhamouda became a member of the political bureau in Tlemcen after Algerian independence in 1962, and was elected to the People's National Assembly in September 1962.

Between 1965 and 1986, Benhamouda held several ministerial positions, including Minister of Justice under Houari Boumédiène from 1970 to 1977. In the middle of his term, he was replaced by Abdelmalek Benhabyles and appointed to be Minister of Public Works, where he served until 1979. In 1980, he was appointed Minister of the Interior where he served until 1982. From 1982 to 1986, Benhamouda served as the Minister of Finance.

Benhamouda was elected Secretary-General of the FLN in 1996, just after the Algerian Civil War and the conflict with the FIS. His predecessor, Abdelhamid Mehri, had been disowned from the old guard of the FLN for pursuing peaceful dialogue in Rome with the FIS. Benhamouda, a representative of this old guard, was elected with 89 votes to Mouloud Hamrouche's 82. Benhamouda was forced to resign in 2001 after the party base of the FLN called for change, and he praised his successor Ali Benflis.

After retiring from politics, Benhamouda wrote books and dictionaries in French and Arabic, along with histories of the Algerian War and French influence in Algeria.
