= Slimane Hoffman =

Algerian politician

7th wali of Algiers Province
- In office August 18, 1970 – January 17, 1975
- Preceded by: M'hamed Yala
- Succeeded by: Abderrazek Bouhara

Chief of Staff of the FLN
- In office 1960–1962

Advisor to the Algerian President
- In office 1975–1979
- President: Houari Boumédiène; Chadli Bendjedid

Personal details
- Born: 1922
- Died: 1992 (aged 69–70) Nice, France

Slimane Hoffman was an Algerian politician and veteran who served in the FLN during the Algerian War and as the sixth wali of Algiers Province between 1970 and 1975. Hoffman was a prominent member of Houari Boumédiène's presidency.

== Biography ==
Hoffman was born in 1922 to a father in the French Foreign Legion and an Algerian mother. He served in the French Army as a tank specialist in the 1950s. While stationed in Germany, Hoffman and several other officers deserted their post to join the FLN. In the FLN, Hoffman was sent to train FLN recruits and officers in Tunisia, and between 1960 and 1962 Hoffman served as Chief of Staff of the Algerian Ministry of Defense. During that time, he also held several positions within the Algerian government.

Following Algerian independence, Hoffman served as the commander of military intelligence under Houari Boumédiène until 1965. Hoffman informed American intelligence on the condition of Boumediene while the president was in a coma. Hoffman was appointed as wali of Algiers Province on August 18, 1970, succeeding M'hamed Yala. He held this position until January 17, 1975, when he was succeeded by Abderrazek Bouhara.

From 1975 to 1979, Hoffman served as the advisor to the Algerian president. During that time, he also served as the FLN chief of international relations, a position in which he remained until 1987. In an interview with the New York Times in 1982, Hoffman supported better relations between Algeria and the United States. Hoffman died in 1992 in Nice, France.
