= Revolutionary Council (Algeria) =

Ruling council of Algeria

- مجلس الثورة
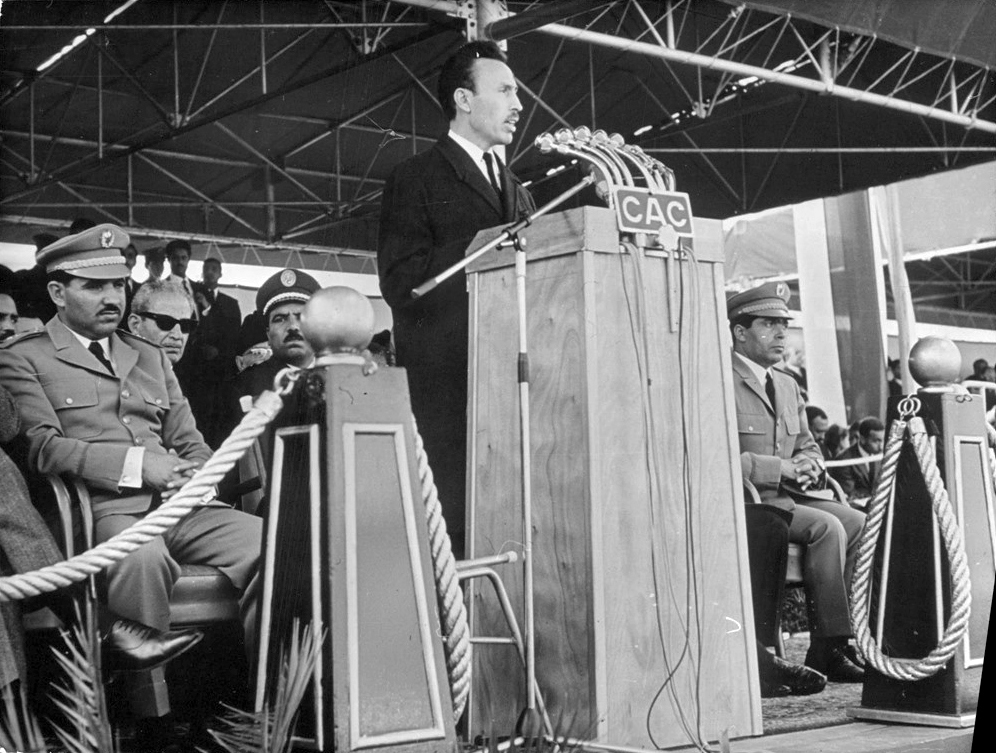
- Formation: 19 June 1965
- Dissolved: 10 December 1976
- Type: Acting presidency
- Legal status: Dissolved by the 1976 Algerian constitution
- Headquarters: Algiers, Algeria
- Chairman: Houari Boumédiène

The Revolutionary Council (Arabic: مجلس الثورة) was the governmental body that ruled Algeria after the coup d'état in June 1965. Colonel Houari Boumédiène was its chairman from 19 June 1965 to 10 December 1976. It replaced the People's National Assembly and functioned as the "supreme authority of the Revolution". Boumediene then restored the People's National Assembly and dissolved the Revolutionary Council after drafting the 1976 Algerian constitution, approved by 99% of voters. He then served as president after winning the 1976 presidential election with a great majority until his death on 27 December 1978. The council was initially made up of 26 members, almost all of them were officers of the Algerian People's National Army linked to the Oujda Group. The members were eventually reduced to nine by 1976.

== Membership ==
The members were as follows in 1970:

- Moulay Abdelkader
- Ahmed Belhouchet
- Mohammed Ben Ahmed
- Ahmed Bencherif
- Bouhadjar Benhaddou
- Chadli Bendjedid
- Abderrahman Ben Salem
- Abdelaziz Bouteflika
- Ahmed Draia
- Ahmed Kaid
- Ahmed Medeghri
- Yahyaoui Mohammed Salah
- Salah Soufi
- Mohammed Taibi

Two of the members of the council later became the President of Algeria:

- Chadli Bendjedid (1979–1992)
- Abdelaziz Bouteflika (1999–2019)

== Sources ==
- The Europa World Year Book 1970
