= Abderrezak Bouhara =

Algerian politician (1934–2013)

7th wali of Algiers Province
- In office January 17, 1975 – March 31, 1978
- Preceded by: Slimane Hoffman
- Succeeded by: Daho Ould Kablia

Minister of Health of Algeria
- In office March 8, 1979 – 1982
- Preceded by: Saïd Aït Messaoudène
- Succeeded by: Djamel-Eddine Houhou

Personal details
- Born: December 1934 Collo, French Algeria
- Died: February 10, 2013 (aged 78) Ain Naadja Military Hospital, Kouba, Algeria
- Party: FLN
- Occupation: Politician, army officer

Military service
- Rank: Lieutenant colonel
- Battles/wars: Algerian War; Six Day War

Abderrezak Bouhara was an Algerian politician and veteran who served as the seventh wali of Algiers Province between 1975 and 1978, the Algerian Minister of Health between 1978 and 1982, and various military positions in embassies in Paris, Moscow, and Hanoi.

== Biography ==
Bouhara was born in Collo, French Algeria in December 1934, first joining the FLN in 1955 and fighting under Houari Boumédiène. He had left his final year at Ahmed Reda Houhou High School in Constantine to join the FLN. He first served as a political commissioner in the FLN, and then as the head of the 39th Battalion in eastern Algeria. Bouhara then underwent military training at Homs Military Academy in Syria, graduating as valedictorian. He then received a degree in military sciences from the Egyptian Military Academy in Cairo.

Bouhara then helped train Algerian soldiers in Tunisia, and was one of the first officers of the FLN to re-enter the country just before Algerian independence in 1962. Following Algerian independence, Bouhara became an aide-de-camp of President Ahmed Ben Bella that same year, before being transferred to commander of the 3rd Military Region in Béchar in 1964 and military attache at the Algerian embassy in Paris and the Algerian embassy in Moscow from 1965 to 1968. During the Six-Day War, Bouhara commanded the Algerian regiment that fought Israel in Suez.

From 1970 to 1975, Bouhara became military attache at the Embassy of Algeria, Hanoi during the Vietnam War. On January 17, 1975, he was appointed as wali of Algiers province, succeeding Slimane Hoffman. In 1977, during his tenure as wali, he retired from the military at the rank of lieutenant colonel. He served as wali until March 31, 1978, when he was appointed as the Algerian Minister of Health. Bouhara was reappointed as Minister of Health in 1980 and 1982. The hospital in Skikda was named after Bouhara.

From 1989 until his death, Bouhara served in various positions within the FLN. In 2004, he was appointed as a Council of the Nation, serving as vice-president. After Abdelaziz Belkhadem was ousted as secretary-general of the FLN in 2013, Bouhara was expected to replace him but died of a heart attack at the age of 79 on February 10, 2013.
