= General Union of Algerian Muslim Students =

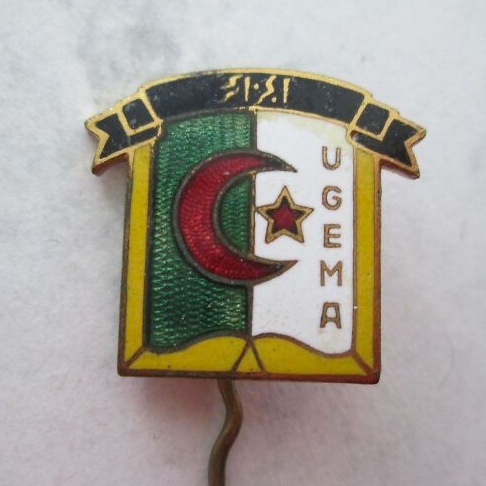
Badge for UGEMA members in the 1950s

The General Union of Algerian Students, abbreviated as UGEA (in Arabic: الإتحاد العام للطلبة الجزائرين), formerly known as the General Union of Algerian Muslim Students with the acronym UGEMA (in Arabic: الإتحاد العام للطلبة المسلمين الجزائرين), is a student organization founded in Paris, France, on July 8, 1955, during the Algerian War.

== History ==
=== Background of its establishment ===
The first "native" student association to emerge was the Amicale des étudiants musulmans de l'Afrique du Nord (AEMAN), created in 1919. Although it was founded on religious grounds, it merged with the Association générale des étudiants d'Alger (AGEA) in 1925. AEMAN was led by Ferhat Abbas from 1927 to 1931, during which it maintained its specificity while adopting a new name: the Association des étudiants musulmans de l'Afrique du Nord, still abbreviated as AEMAN.

At the same time, Algerian students in Paris distanced themselves from an association created in Paris in 1927, the Association des étudiants musulmans nord-africains en France (AEMNAF), and instead created the Association des étudiants musulmans algériens (AEMA) in 1930.

In 1953, the communist activist Ahmed Inal founded a Union of Algerian Students in Paris (UEAP), which also included, according to the doctrine of the Algerian Communist Party (PCA), European and Jewish students. A Union of Algerian Students in Toulouse was also created in March 1955. At the initiative of Belaïd Abdeslam, the president of AEMAN from 1953 to 1955, there was encouragement for the creation of a purely Algerian association. The UEAP and the Toulouse association advocated for the creation of a National Union of Algerian Students (UNEA), while Belaïd Abdeslam favored the creation of a Union of Algerian Muslim Students (UGEMA) since 1953. During a conference in April 1955, attended by Algerian students, the creation of a purely Algerian association was agreed upon. However, the inclusion of the religious criterion sparked discussions, as its adoption would exclude European, Jewish, or communist students. The majority chose to include this criterion with the promise of removing it after independence. As a result, two associations were established in July 1955: the General Union of Algerian Muslim Students (UGEMA) and the UNEA, although the latter lasted only a short time.

=== UGEMA during the Algerian War ===
Ahmed Taleb Ibrahimi became the president of UGEMA while completing his medical studies. In early 1956, tensions arose at the University of Algiers when a pro-French Algeria student action committee overthrew the leadership of AGEA in February 1956. In this context, during UGEMA's second congress held from March 24 to 30, 1956, in Paris, they called for "the proclamation of Algeria's independence, the release of all imprisoned patriots, and negotiations with the National Liberation Front (FLN)." Mouloud Belaouane succeeded Ahmed Taleb Ibrahimi as the head of the association.

In May 1956, the Algiers section of UGEMA called for a "general and unlimited strike of classes and exams and engagement in the ranks of the ALN" (National Liberation Army), with the FLN ordering its generalization. After the FLN lifted the strike order, only the University of Algiers continued the movement.

In late 1956 or early 1957, UGEMA announced the termination of relations with the National Union of French Students (UNEF) "until it declares support for the independence of Algeria."

During its third congress from December 23 to 26, 1957, UGEMA, referencing the movements of 1956, chose to exclude those who did not participate in strikes. The French government dissolved the association on January 28, 1958, stating that it was "deviating from its statutory goals to serve the political ends of the FLN." It was during this congress that Messaoud Aït Chalal was elected as the organization's president.

In June 1960, after a period of interruption, UNEF resumed relations with UGEMA.

Reorganized outside Algeria after its dissolution, UGEMA declared its commitment to the Provisional Government of the Algerian Republic (GPRA) during its fourth congress held in Tunis in July–August 1960. This allowed the National Liberation Army (ALN) to strengthen its recruitment among students.

=== Post-independence ===
Shortly after the ceasefire, UNEF and UGEMA reaffirmed their mutual desire to develop cooperation and indicated that they had examined the issue of "the place of European-origin students in Algerian student unionism." At that time, the University of Algiers had "seven hundred Muslim students for nearly six thousand European-origin students."

As agreed upon during its creation, UGEMA dropped the "M" from its name and became UGEA in August 1963; it is sometimes mistakenly referred to as the Union Nationale des Étudiants Algériens (UNEA).

In June 1964, two former presidents of UGEMA, Ahmed Taleb Ibrahimi and Aït Chalal, were imprisoned on suspicion of "counterrevolutionary activities." They were released in January 1965.

In September 1965, shortly after Houari Boumédiène seized power, the FLN, lamenting that some members were "following the orders of a foreign party" (the French Communist Party) within the association, imposed a new leadership commission on UGEA. This occurred in a context of hostility from a part of the student movement towards the new head of state.

In 2014, UGEA expressed support for Abdelaziz Bouteflika's fourth term. In 2018, according to Le Matin d'Algérie, the union was mentioned as being closely aligned with the National Democratic Rally (RND). UGEA was mentioned as still active as of June 2022.
