= DAFS (disambiguation) =

DAFS may refer to:

- Damage Analysis and Fundamental Studies, a program of the United States Department of Energy that studies radiation damage
- Direct Access File System, a network file system that uses remote direct memory access to perform efficient network access to data in remote files
- Direct Aerial Fire Support, a term describing helicopter combat support
- Diffraction Anomalous Fine Structure, an X-ray technique for determining atomic structure
- Document Attribute Format Specification, an interchange format representing document structure

== See also ==
- DAF (disambiguation)
