= Djamel-Eddine Houhou =

Algerian diplomat and politician (1934–2022)

Djamel Houhou

Minister of Public Health
- In office 22 January 1984 – 15 February 1988
- Preceded by: Abderrezak Bouhara
- Succeeded by: Kasdi Merbah

Minister of Youth and Sport
- In office 23 April 1977 – 12 January 1982
- Preceded by: Abdallah Fadel
- Succeeded by: Abdenour Bekka

Personal details
- Born: 23 October 1934 Guemar, French Algeria
- Died: November 2022 (aged 88) Paris, France
- Party: FLN
- Occupation: Diplomat

Djamel Houhou (Arabic: جمال حوحو; 23 October 1934 – 20 November 2022) was an Algerian diplomat and politician.

== Early life ==
Houhou studied political science in Lausanne and joined the National Liberation Front (FLN) in 1956.

== Career ==
After his studies, Houhou then joined the Provisional Government of the Algerian Republic in Tunis, where he held several positions in foreign affairs.

Upon the end of the Algerian War and Algeria's independence, Houhou joined the administration of the Ministry of Foreign Affairs, he was Director of Affaires Françaises before being appointed ambassador to Canada, where he served from 1971 to 1974, and ambassador to Egypt from 1975 to 1977.

On 23 April 1977, Houhou was appointed Minister of Youth and Sport. He implemented reforms in Algeria's sporting system, which produced positive results in the 1980s. He brought Algeria to their first participation at the World Cup in 1982. From 1982 to 1984, he was the ambassador of Algeria to France. He then became Minister of Public Health, where he served from 22 January 1984 to 15 February 1988.

== Death ==
Houhou died in November 20, 2022, in Paris, France at the age of 88.
