= DAF =

DAF or Daf may refer to:

== Business and organizations ==
- DAF Bus International, Netherlands, later VDL Bus & Coach
- DAF Car BV, later VDL Nedcar
- DAF Trucks, truck manufacturer headquartered in Eindhoven, Netherlands
  - DAF NV, former holding company of DAF Trucks and Leyland DAF
  - DAF Trucks (cycling team) (UCI team code: DAF), former Belgian professional team sponsored by DAF Trucks
  - Leyland DAF, former commercial vehicle manufacturer
- Danish Artist Union (Dansk Artist Forbund), a trade union in Denmark
- Deutsche Arbeitsfront ("German Labour Front"), Nazi Germany's labor organization
- Donor advised fund, an investment vehicle for charitable giving

== People ==
- Mohamed Daf (born 1994), Senegalese footballer
- Omar Daf (born 1977), Senegalese former football player
- Daf Hobson (born 1951), English cinematographer
- Daf Palfrey (born 1973), Welsh director, producer and writer.

== Military ==
- United States Department of the Air Force
- Desert Air Force, World War II Royal Air Force unit
- Defectors from the French army to the ALN (défecteurs de l'armée française), a faction within the Algerian army
- Djibouti Air Force

== Music ==
- Daf, a percussion instrument
- Deutsch Amerikanische Freundschaft (D.A.F.), a German electropunk band
- "D.A.F." (song), by Powderfinger

== Science and technology ==
- Decay-accelerating factor, a protein encoded by the CD55 gene
- Delayed Auditory Feedback, extending the time between speech and hearing
- Directed attention fatigue, a neuro-psychological phenomenon
- Dissolved air flotation, a water treatment process
- DNA amplification fingerprinting, also known as DAF, a DNA profiling technique
- Dynamic amplification factor in structural dynamics
- Dual Pixel CMOS AF, a technology in the Canon EOS 7D Mark II camera

== Other uses ==
- Diamonds Are Forever (novel), 1956 novel by Ian Fleming
  - Diamonds Are Forever (film), 1971 James Bond film
    - Diamonds Are Forever (soundtrack), soundtrack to the film made by John Barry with a title song sung by Shirley Bassey
- Daf, a double-sided page, frequently referring to a folio of the Babylonian Talmud
- daf, retired ISO:639-3 code for the Dan language, Africa
- DAF, FAA location identifier for Necedah Airport, Wisconsin, US
- DAF, IATA code for Duap Airport, Papua New Guinea
- Delivered At Frontier, Incoterm for a named place of delivery

== See also ==
- DAFS (disambiguation)
- Daaf Drok (1914–2002), Dutch footballer
- Daaf or David Baan (1908–1984), Dutch boxer
