= Movement for Justice and Development =

Movement for Justice and Development may refer to:

- Movement for Justice and Development (Slovenia)
- Movement for Justice and Development in Syria
- Algerian Movement for Justice and Development
