= 1988 presidential election =

1988 presidential election may refer to:

- 1988 Algerian presidential election
- 1988 Cypriot presidential election
- 1988 Finnish presidential election
- 1988 French presidential election
- 1988 Icelandic presidential election
- 1988 Israeli presidential election
- 1988 Maldivian presidential election
- 1988 Mexican presidential election
- 1988 Rwandan presidential election
- 1988 Sri Lankan presidential election
- 1988 United States presidential election
- 1988 Venezuelan presidential election
