= Saïd Aït Messaoudène =

Algerian politician (1933–2009)

1st Commander-in-Chief of the Algerian Air Force
- In office 1962–1969
- Preceded by: Position established

2nd President of Air Algerie
- In office 1969 – December 18, 1972
- Preceded by: Laroussi Khalifa

Minister of Health of Algeria
- In office April 23, 1977 – March 8, 1978
- Preceded by: Omar Boudjellab
- Succeeded by: Abderrezak Bouhara

Personal details
- Born: July 25, 1933 Had-Sahary, Djelfa Province, French Algeria
- Died: January 1, 2009 (aged 75) Algiers, Algeria
- Children: Mohammed Seddik Ait Messaoudene

Military service
- Allegiance: France (1951-1958); Algeria (1958-2009)
- Battles/wars: Algerian War; Sand War

Saïd Aït Messaoudène was an Algerian politician and aviator, considered one of the founding fathers of Algerian aviation. He served as the first commander of the Algerian Air Force.

== Early life ==
Messaoudene was born on July 25, 1933 in Had-Sahary, Djelfa Province, Algeria. He grew up in a conservative family, originally from Tizi Ouzou. He attended a Quranic school in his town, where he memorized the Quran, and then moved to Blida with his uncle. Messaoudene attended a technical institute where he was given the opportunity to participate with trainees for an aviation academy located in Allied-occupied Germany. In 1951, when he training was completed, he was transferred to the Aviation School in Salon-de-Provence, where he graduated top of his class with the rank of second lieutenant.

Messaoudene was transferred to the Marrakesh Air Base 707 under the French Army as part of NATO operations. During his brief stint in Marrakesh, he made contact with FLN officials. Mansour Boudaoud told Messaoudene to meet with Hafid Keramane and Mouloud Kassem when he returned to Germany. Boudaoud told him how to escape the watch of French officials, and the password to be received by the FLN head of mission at the Tunisian embassy in Bonn. Keramane gave Messaoudene a Tunisian passport, and helped him escape to Switzerland where he met the FLN delegation in Bern, who gave him an Egyptian passport. Messaoudene fled to Tunis and then Cairo, deserting the French Army and joining the FLN in 1958.

== Algerian service ==
When he first arrived in FLN territory, he was subject to a thorough investigation to prove he wasn't a traitor. News of Messaoudene's strong background as a NATO fighter pilot and Algerian loyalty reached then-Minister of War Krim Belkacem, who personally admitted Messaoudene into the FLN because he knew his family. In the FLN, Messaoudene was entrusted to train young pilots in allied countries supporting the FLN such as the USSR, Yugoslavia, Egypt, China, and Iraq. Messaoudene would use his piloting experience to drop supply parachutes and transport cargo from Algeria elsewhere.

This strategy was developed due to Chinese and Soviet distaste in the idea of building an airbase in Libya to supply the FLN. Messaoudene led these raids and supply drops, and became the first activities of the Algerian Air Force.

After Algerian independence, Messaoudene was appointed the first commander-in-chief of the newly-established Algerian Air Force. During the Sand War in 1963, Moroccan aircraft struck Algerian troops moving from Béchar to Tindouf and then Tindouf to the border. The airbase in Bechar and one near Tindouf were controlled by France, who ordered Algeria not to use them. Messaoudene responded by ordering his planes further south.

He was appointed advisor to president Houari Boumédiène until 1969, when he took over as the head of Air Algérie, succeeding the first company president Laroussi Khalifa. Under Messaoudene, Air Algerie completed nationalization. Messaoudene held several ministerial positions in the 1970s and 1980s. From 1972 to 1977, he served as Minister of Posts and Telecommunications, from 1977 to 1978 as Minister of Health, from 1979 to 1984 as Minister of Light Industry, and as vice-president of the Algerian Parliament from 1987 and 1992. In 1992, he retired from politics.

Messaoudene died on January 1, 2009 after a long illness at the Ain Naadja Military Hospital in Algiers. He was buried at El Alia Cemetery. His son Mohamed Seddik Ait Messaoudene was appointed Minister of Health on September 14, 2025. Air Algerie renamed their headquarters in Bab Ezzouar after Messaoudene in 2024.
