= 1979 Algerian presidential election =

Election of Chadli Bendjedid

- 7 February 1979
- Registered: 7,888,875
- Turnout: 98.99%
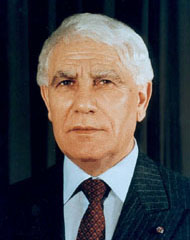
Candidate	Chadli Bendjedid
Party	FLN
Popular vote	7,736,697
Percentage	99.37%
President before election
Rabah Bitat (acting)
FLN
Elected President
Chadli Bendjedid
FLN

Presidential elections were held in Algeria on 7 February 1979, following the death of incumbent Houari Boumediene in December 1978. His replacement as National Liberation Front leader, Chadli Bendjedid, was elected unopposed with 99% of the vote, based on a 99% turnout.

== Results ==
Candidate	Party	Votes	%
Chadli Bendjedid	National Liberation Front	7,736,697	99.37
Against		48,938	0.63
Total		7,785,635	100.00
Valid votes		7,785,635	99.70
Invalid/blank votes		23,803	0.30
Total votes		7,809,438	100.00
Registered voters/turnout		7,888,875	98.99
Source: Nohlen et al.
