= Youcef Khatib =

Algerian doctor and military officer (1932–2023)

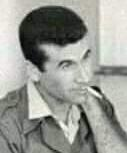
- Born: 19 November 1932; Orléansville, French Algeria
- Died: 26 October 2023 (aged 90)
- Occupations: Doctor; Military officer

Youcef Khatib (Arabic: يوسف الخطيب; 19 November 1932 – 26 October 2023) was an Algerian doctor and military officer. He directed the Historic Wilaya IV during the Algerian War from August 1961 until independence in 1962.

Youcef Khatib was the cousin of Abdelkrim al-Khatib, a Moroccan surgeon and politician.

== Biography ==
Born in Orléansville on 19 November 1932, Khatib attended the École Lallemand and the Collège d'Orléansville. He also played football with Groupement sportif orléansvillois. He then moved to Algiers to study medicine, but his studies were interrupted to join the Maquis.

Khatib joined the National Liberation Army in 1956 following the student strike by the National Liberation Front. He led the Historic Wilaya IV from 1961 to 1962, having first worked in the Wilaya's health service and managing a military infirmary.

After independence, Khatib resumed his medical studies, earning his degree and specializing in surgery. In 1994, he chaired the National Conference during the Algerian Civil War. During the 1999 presidential election, Khatib, a critic of Abdelaziz Bouteflika, ran as a candidate but withdrew shortly before the vote.

Youcef Khatib died on 26 October 2023, at the age of 90.
