= Tifra =

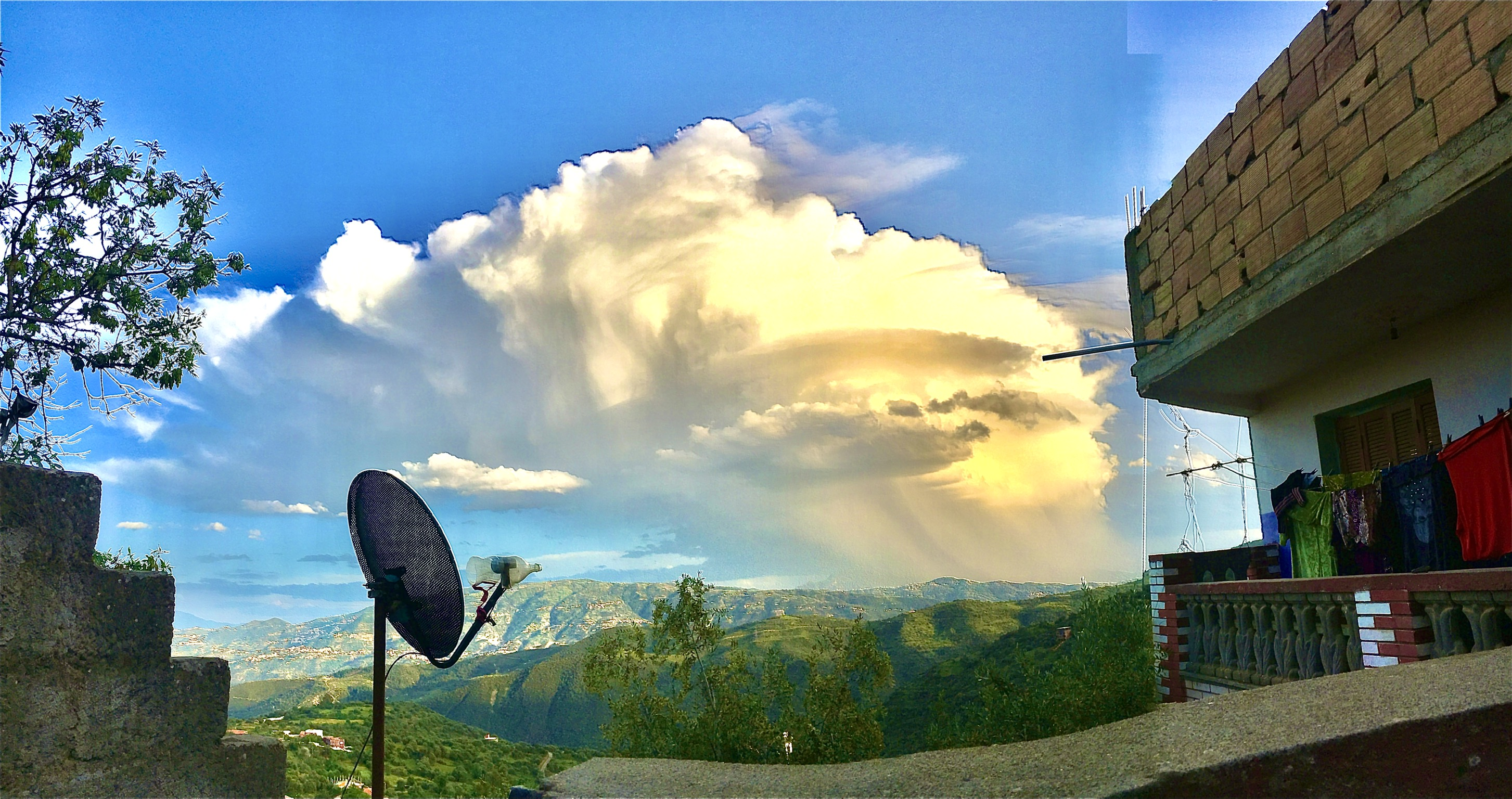

- Location within Algeria
- Country: Algeria
- Province: Béjaïa

Government
- Time zone: UTC+1 (West Africa Time)

Tifra is a commune in northern Algeria in the Béjaïa Province. It is home to a famous spa town, Hamma Sillal.

== Geography ==
=== Name origin ===
The origin of the name of the commune of Tifra comes from its most populated village, which is the village of Tifra. The administrative center of the commune is located about three kilometers from the village, at a place called Sillal (Hammam Sillal).
