= Le Matin d'Algérie =

Algerian online newspaper

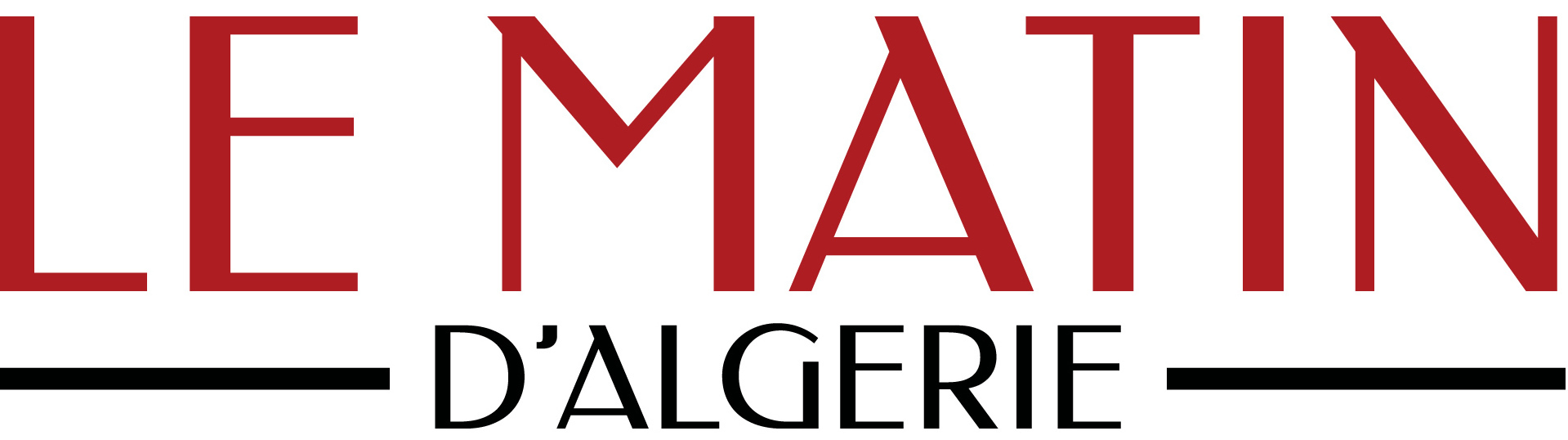
- Type: Daily newspaper
- Format: Online
- Owner(s): Mohamed Benchicou, Hamid Arab
- Founder: Mohamed Benchicou
- Founded: 2017; 9 years ago
- Language: French
- Headquarters: Algiers, Algeria
- Country: Algeria
- Website: lematindalgerie.com

Le Matin d'Algérie (The Sunrise of Algeria) is an Algerian online newspaper. According to the newspaper's self-description on its website, it aims to continue in the tradition of the print newspaper, Le Matin, arbitrarily suspended by the Algerian authorities in July 2004.
