= 1988 Algerian presidential election =

Second re-election of Chadli Bendjedid

- 22 December 1988
- Registered: 13,060,720
- Turnout: 89.08%
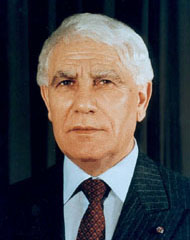
Candidate	Chadli Bendjedid
Party	FLN
Popular vote	10,603,067
Percentage	93.26%
President before election
Chadli Bendjedid
FLN
Elected President
Chadli Bendjedid
FLN

Presidential elections were held in Algeria on 22 December 1988. Incumbent President Chadli Bendjedid, leader of the National Liberation Front (the country's sole legal political party), was re-elected unopposed with 93% of the vote, based on an 89% turnout.

== Results ==
Candidate	Party	Votes	%
Chadli Bendjedid	National Liberation Front	10,603,067	93.26
Against		766,237	6.74
Total		11,369,304	100.00
Valid votes		11,369,304	97.72
Invalid/blank votes		264,835	2.28
Total votes		11,634,139	100.00
Registered voters/turnout		13,060,720	89.08
Source: Algeria Official Journal
