= Embassy of Algeria, Paris =

Embassy of Algeria in France
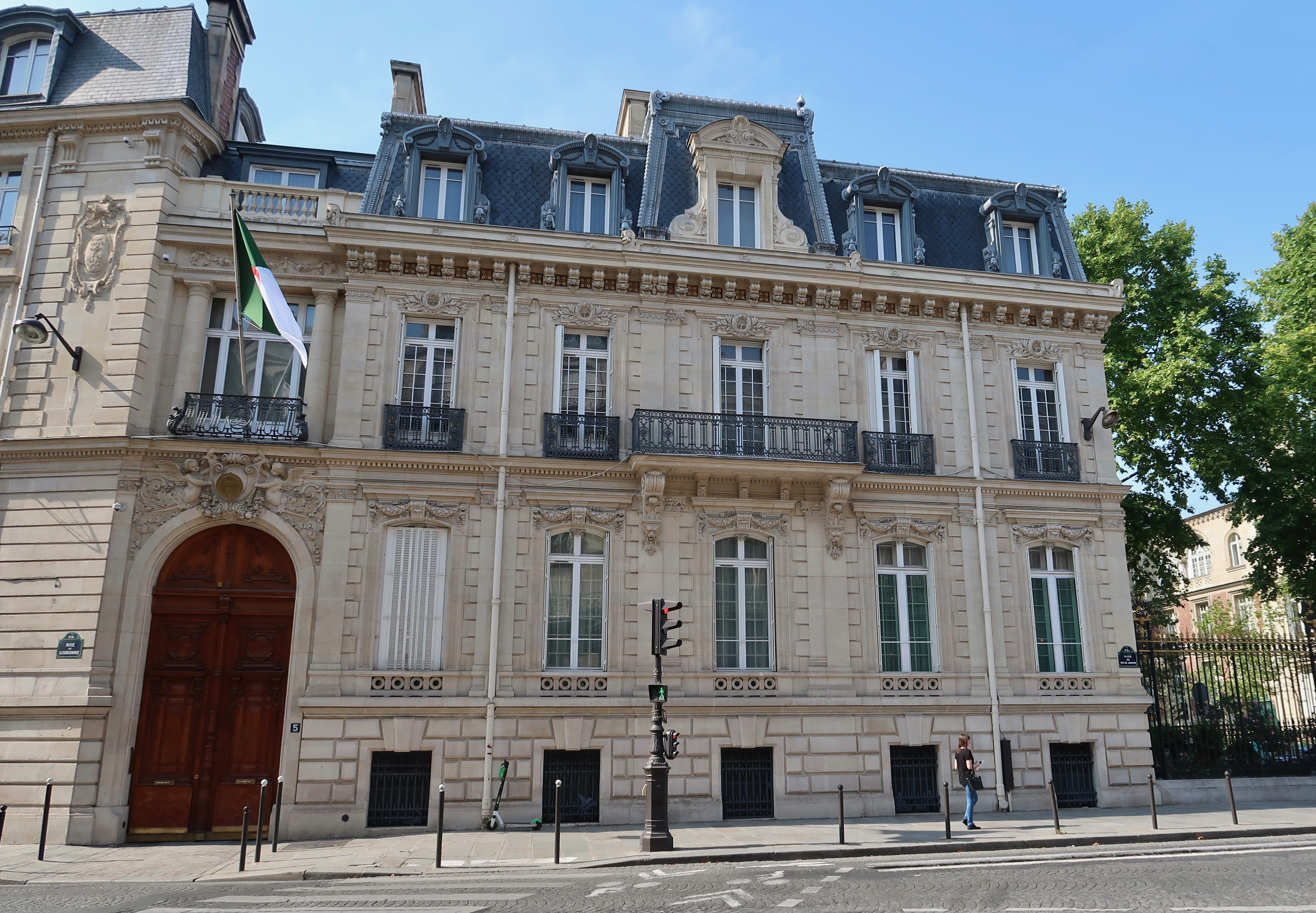
- Location: Paris
- Coordinates: 48.8775°N 2.3097°E

The Embassy of Algeria in France (Arabic: سفارة الجزائر في فرنسا) is the diplomatic representation of the People's Democratic Republic of Algeria to the French Republic, since Algeria gained independence from France in 1962. It is located at 50 Rue de Lisbonne, in the 8th arrondissement of Paris, the capital of France.

The Ambassador Extraordinary and Plenipotentiary of Algeria to France also represents Algeria to Andorra and Monaco (independent principalities but linked to France) and to UNESCO (an international organization based in Paris).

== Buildings ==
The building that houses the embassy is a mansion that belonged to Baron Empain. It is bordered by Rue de Lisbonne and Place de Rio-de-Janeiro to the south, Avenue Ruysdaël to the east, and Rue Murillo to the north. It is adjacent to Parc Monceau.

The Algerian International School in France (EIAF) was established in October 2001, and later named after the philosopher Malek Bennabi in 2005 by the Minister of Foreign Affairs, Mohamed Bedjaoui. It is spread across several locations: 40 Rue Boileau (16th arrondissement of Paris), 6 Rue des Eaux, also in the same arrondissement, and more recently, 48 Rue Bouret (19th arrondissement), in the former premises of the general consulate. The institution accommodates primary, middle school, and high school students, and the diplomas are recognized by both the French and Algerian education systems.

The Algerian Cultural Center in France is situated at 171 Rue de la Croix-Nivert (15th arrondissement).
