= Mohamed Bachir El Ibrahimi =

Algerian Islamic scholar (1889–1965)

- محمد البشير الإبراهيمي
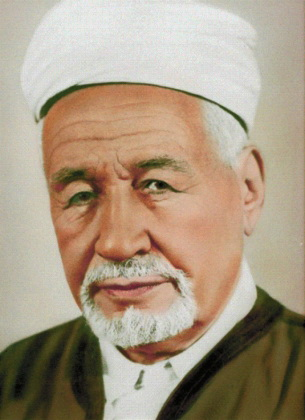

Personal life
- Born: 13 June 1889 Ouled Brahim, French Algeria
- Died: 20 May 1965 (aged 75) Setif, Algeria

Religious life
- Religion: Islam
- Jurisprudence: Maliki
- Creed: Athari
- Movement: Salafiyya, Islamic Reformism

Mohamed Bachir El Ibrahimi (Arabic: محمد البشير الإبراهيمي), also known as Sheikh Bachir El Ibrahimi (13 June 1889 – 20 May 1965) was an Algerian Islamic scholar known for his important role in Algerian Islamic Reformism especially as one of the seniors of Association of Algerian Muslim Ulema.

== Biography ==
Mohamed Bachir El Ibrahimi was born on 13 June 1889 (14 Shawwal 1306 AH) in Ouled Brahem within the Arab tribe of Awlād Ibrāhīm, in a family descended from Muhammad, where he began his religious education by memorizing the Quran and studying some texts (moutoun) of Maliki jurisprudence (fiqh) with his father and uncle.

=== Education in Cairo and Medina (1911-1916) ===
In 1911 (1330 AH), he joined his family in Medina via Cairo (where he stayed for 3 months during which he met the Egyptian poets Ahmed Shawqi and Hafez Ibrahim). In the second holiest city in Islam, he studied Imam Malik's Muwatta and Maliki jurisprudence under the patronage of Sheikh Abdelaziz al-Tounissi, and Sahih Muslim under Hussain Ahmed Madani, a prominent figure in Deobandism and Indian nationalist activism. He was also influenced by students of religious science (toulab al-ilm) from Chinguetti. Additionally, he undertook memorizing several collections of poems, thereby gaining eloquence that would be beneficial for his career.

=== Damascus (1916-1920) ===
In 1916, due to political unrest in the Hejaz (Arab revolt, siege of Medina), he moved to Damascus, where he continued his religious education at the Umayyad Mosque alongside scholars (ulema) Mohammed Al-Khidr Hussein, Djamal ad-Dine al-Qassimi, and Badreddine al-Hassani.

In 1919, he participated in the founding of the Arab Academy of Damascus with Muhammad Kurd Ali.

=== Return to Algeria (1920-1924) ===
Upon his return to Algeria in 1920 (1338 AH), he worked on spreading reform (al-islah) and religious education in the city of Sétif, where he ran a mosque not affiliated with the French colonial authorities.

=== Reform Movement and the Association of Algerian Muslim Scholars ===
In 1924, his friend Abdelhamid Ben Badis, whom he met in Medina, proposed the idea of creating the Algerian reform movement (al-harakat al-islah al-djaza'iriyyah), which he enthusiastically accepted. His first mission for the movement was to preach in western Algeria, which he accomplished successfully by establishing several free Quranic schools (madaris) and delivering captivating sermons (khoutab).

His activities within the reform movement and later, starting from 1931, within the Association of Muslim Scholars, drew hostility from some notables and Sufis who demanded that the colonial authorities take action against him. This happened in 1939 when they decided to exile him to Aflou after he authored an anti-colonialist article in the El-Islah newspaper. After Ben Badis' death in 1940, he was elected as the head of the Association of Muslim Scholars while still under house arrest. This ended on 28 December 1942, following the Allied landing in North Africa, but El Ibrahimi was arrested again after the events of May 1945. Released a year later, he resumed his public activities and wrote scathing articles against French colonialism and its "agents" in the columns of the El-Bassir newspaper, which reopened in 1947.

=== Post-Independence (1962) ===
After Algeria gained independence in 1962, he held the positions of imam and khatib in the Ketchaoua Mosque. However, opposed to Ben Bella's socialist self-management regime, he once again faced house arrest and died in this situation on 20 May 1965, less than a month before the coup d'état that ousted Ben Bella.
