= Algerian Movement for Justice and Development =

Political party in Algeria

The Algerian Movement for Justice and Development (French: Mouvement Algérien pour la Justice et le Développement, MAJD) is a political party in Algeria.

== History ==
The party was founded on 5 November 1990 by former Prime Minister Kasdi Merbah after he left the National Liberation Front (FLN) in October. Led by Merbah, it was effectively a vehicle for his political ambitions; although he had become isolated within the FLN, the policies of MAJD were little different, and its membership consisted largely of his friends and former FLN and Sécurité Militaire associates.

In the 1991 parliamentary elections the party received only 0.4% of the vote and failed to win a seat, although the results were later annulled. Merbah was later assassinated on 21 August 1993.

As of 2014, the party was led by Abdullah Gaballah.
