= Direct Access File System =

Type of file system

Direct Access File System (DAFS) is a network file system that is based on NFSv4 and the Virtual Interface (VI) data transfer mechanism. DAFS uses remote direct memory access (RDMA) to perform efficient network access to data in remote files. This lowers latency by reducing the number of steps needed to process and transfer remote data. File locking is cached on the client side, eliminating the need to access the file server for subsequent data access.

The DAFS was initially developed by Network Appliance Inc. An 85-member industry association named the DAFS Collaborative was assembled to complete the specification. With the draft release of v1.0, it was then passed to the Internet Engineering Task Force (IETF). Version 1.0 of the DAFS application programming interface was completed in 2001. The same year, a working version of DAFS was demonstrated using the Oracle database. DAFS beta version 1.0 is available from SourceForge under the BSD license. It was last updated in 2004.
