= Kasdi Merbah =

Algerian politician

- قاصدي مرباح
- Merbah in 1981

4th Prime Minister of Algeria Head of Government of Algeria
- In office 5 November 1988 – 9 September 1989
- President: Chadli Bendjedid
- Preceded by: Abdelhamid Brahimi (as Prime Minister)
- Succeeded by: Mouloud Hamrouche

Personal details
- Born: Abdallah Khalef; 16 April 1938 Beni Yenni, Algeria
- Died: 21 August 1993 (aged 55) Bordj El Bahri, Algiers
- Cause of death: Assassinated
- Resting place: Algiers
- Party: National Liberation Front (Algeria)

Military service
- Battles/wars: Algerian War, Algerian Civil War

Kasdi Merbah (Arabic: قاصدي مرباح, 16 April 1938 – 21 August 1993), whose real name is Abdallah Khalef, was an Algerian politician who served as Head of Government between 5 November 1988 and 9 September 1989 when he was a member of the National Liberation Front. He was assassinated on August 21, 1993.

== Early life ==
Kasdi Merbah was born on the 16th of April 1938 in the province of Beni Yenni.

== Political career ==
During the 1970s and early 1980s, he was the head of the Sécurité Militaire, the Algerian state intelligence service. Before the 1988 October Riots he had served as Minister of Agriculture and then Minister of Public Health, and the following month he was appointed prime minister. However, during his tenure he had an increasingly fractious relationship with President Chadli Bendjedid, and was removed from office in September 1989.

Public criticism of Bendjedid led to him becoming isolated within the FLN, and in October 1990 he left the party to form the Algerian Movement for Justice and Development, known by its acronym "MAJD", meaning "glory" in Arabic. However, the party failed to win a seat in the 1991 parliamentary elections, the results of which were annulled after a military coup. Merbah appeared to be a very moderate politician and tried (secretly and overtly) to help in finding a solution for the Algerian Civil War that followed the coup. A great number of analysts attribute his assassination to his past in the security services and the many state secrets he possessed, beside the apparent moderate posture he had adopted with regard to dealing with the Islamist movements, particularly the FIS who went for the armed option.

== Assassination ==
On August 21, 1993, Kasdi was assassinated in Bordj El Bahri along with his younger son Hakim, his brother Abdelaziz, his driver Hachemi Ait Mekidèche, as well as his bodyguard Abdelaziz Nasri. They were attacked with automatic pistol fire by a band of five men while driving in Alger-Plage, a coastal resort 12 miles east of the capital, police said. The murder was condemned by agents of the FIS in Europe who claimed it was carried out by the Algerian intelligence service, while the responsibility was claimed by the GIA.

Political offices
Preceded by Abdelhamid Brahimi	Prime Minister of Algeria; 1988–1989	Succeeded by Mouloud Hamrouche
