= Defectors from the French army to the ALN =

Defectors from the French army to the ALN, pejoratively called hizb França (the party of France) or abbreviated DAF (défecteurs de l'armée française) constitute an important faction in the Algerian army, and more generally the Algerian power structure, including such key generals as Khaled Nezzar, Mohamed Lamari, Larbi Belkheir, Mohamed Touati, and Abbas Gheziel.

This faction gained power after 1988, especially during the Algerian Civil War. A major military reshuffle in 2000 further increased its influence (with the promotion of such Lamari protégés as Fodhil Cherif and Said Bey) at the expense of ALN fighters who had been trained in Arab countries, rather than in the French army (a faction notably including Liamine Zeroual and Tayeb Derradji.) Several of the main leaders of this faction have now retired, but remain influential. This faction is generally considered eradicationist (favouring no dialogue with Islamist guerrillas in the context of the Algerian Civil War).

Detractors claim that this faction has longstanding close ties with the French government, and question the sincerity of their last-minute changes of side in the Algerian War of Independence. A particularly notable detractor, ex-Prime Minister Abdelhamid Brahimi, assigns them the primary blame for the coup of 1992 and the ensuing Algerian Civil War.
