= 1984 Algerian presidential election =

First re-election of Chadli Bendjedid

- 12 January 1984
- Registered: 10,154,715
- Turnout: 96.28%
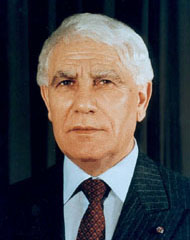
Candidate	Chadli Bendjedid
Party	FLN
Popular vote	9,664,168
Percentage	99.42%
President before election
Chadli Bendjedid
FLN
Elected President
Chadli Bendjedid
FLN

Presidential elections were held in Algeria on 12 January 1984. Incumbent Chadli Bendjedid, leader of the National Liberation Front (the country's sole legal political party), was re-elected unopposed with 99.42% of the vote, based on a 96% voter turnout.

== Results ==
Candidate	Party	Votes	%
Chadli Bendjedid	National Liberation Front	9,664,168	99.42
Against		56,462	0.58
Total		9,720,630	100.00
Valid votes		9,720,630	99.42
Invalid/blank votes		56,322	0.58
Total votes		9,776,952	100.00
Registered voters/turnout		10,154,715	96.28
Source: Nohlen et al.
