= Abdelmalek Benhabyles =

Algerian politician

- عبد المالك بن حابيليس
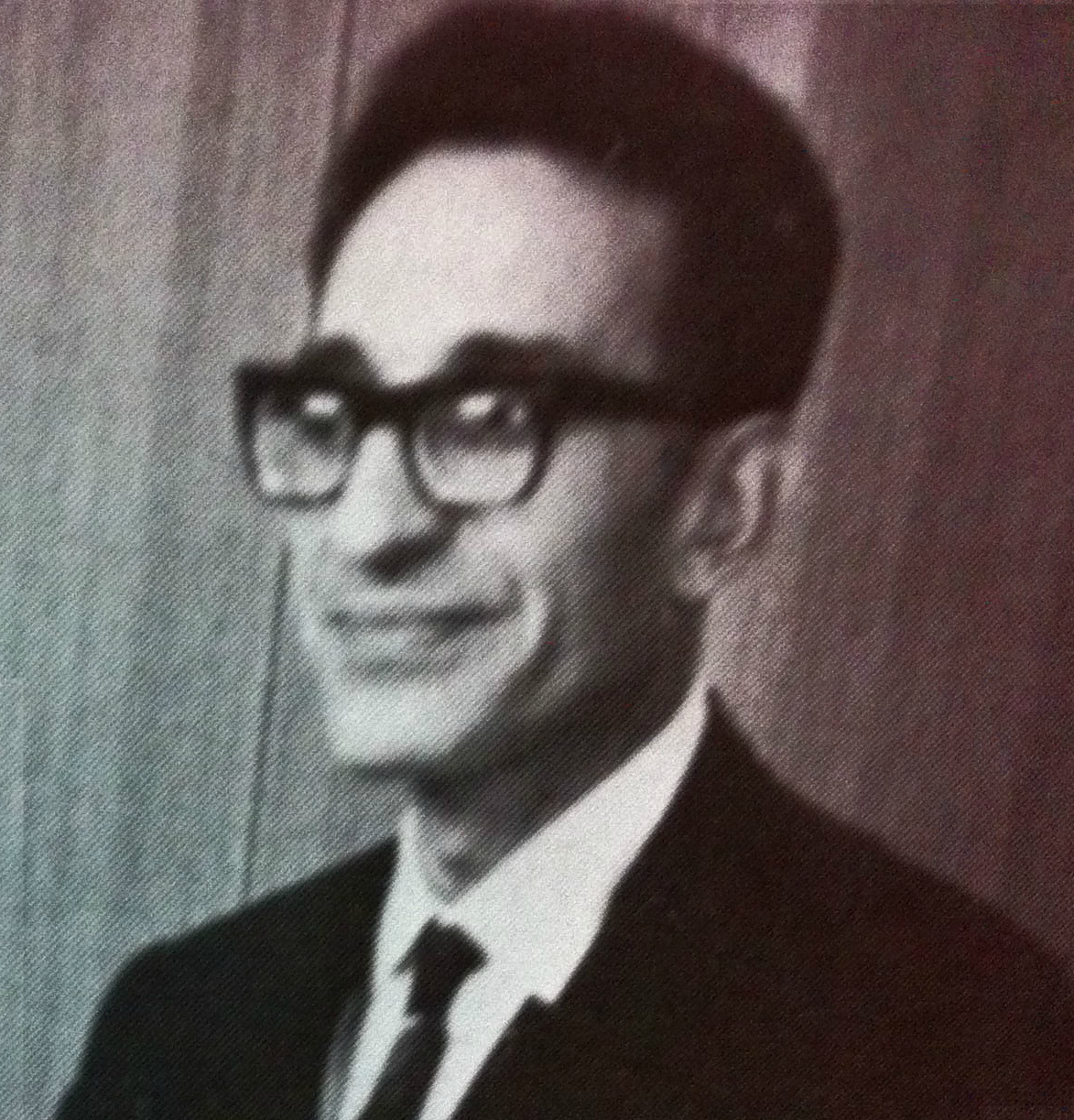
- Benhabyles in 1962

Chairman of the Constitutional Council
- In office 12 April 1989 – 20 March 1995
- President: Chadli Bendjedid
- Prime Minister: Sid Ahmed Ghozali

Minister of Justice
- In office 23 April 1977 – 8 March 1979
- Preceded by: Boualem Benhamouda
- Succeeded by: Lahcène Soufi

Minister Secretary General to the President of Algeria
- In office 8 March 1979 – 15 July 1980

Personal details
- Born: 27 April 1921 Beni Aziz, French Algeria
- Died: 28 December 2018 (aged 97) Algiers, Algeria

Abdelmalek Benhabylès (Arabic: عبد المالك بن حبيلس, 27 April 1921 – 28 December 2018) was an Algerian politician. He was born in Beni Aziz. He was a chairman of the Constitutional Council from 12 April 1989 until 20 March 1995, thus was acting head of state when the military ousted Chadli Bendjedid. He received the 1st Class, Grand Cordon of Order of the Rising Sun on 17 December 2012.

A fervent nationalist, he was Minister of Justice from 1977 to 1979, and in the latter year was appointed Secretary General of the Republic. He was chair of the Ligue algérienne de défense des droits de l’homme (LADDH). He died on 28 December 2018 at the age of 97.

== Honours ==
National

- Grand Master of the National Order of Merit

Foreign

- Grand Cordon of Order of the Rising Sun (Japan, 17 December 2012).

Political offices
Preceded by Chadli Bendjedid	President of Algeria; Acting; 1992	Succeeded by Mohamed Boudiaf as Chairman of the High Council of State
