= 1976 Algerian constitutional referendum =

Algerian constitutional referendum

19 November 1976

Results
Choice	Votes	%
Yes	7,407,626	99.09%
No	67,683	0.91%
Valid votes	7,475,309	99.67%
Invalid or blank votes	25,007	0.33%
Total votes	7,500,316	100.00%
Registered voters/turnout	8,076,834	92.86%

A constitutional referendum was held in Algeria on 19 November 1976. The amendments restored the People's National Assembly (which had been suspended since the 1965 coup) and allowed for the direct election of the President, as well as creating a socialist state and confirming the National Liberation Front as the sole legal party., Approved by 99% of voters with a 93% turnout, the revised constitution was promulgated on 22 November.

== Results ==
Choice	Votes	%
For	7,407,626	99.09
Against	67,683	0.91
Total	7,475,309	100.00
Valid votes	7,475,309	99.67
Invalid/blank votes	25,007	0.33
Total votes	7,500,316	100.00
Registered voters/turnout	8,076,834	92.86
Source: Official Journal
