= 1976 Algerian presidential election =

Election of Houari Boumediene

- 10 December 1976
- Registered: 8,352,147
- Turnout: 97.07%
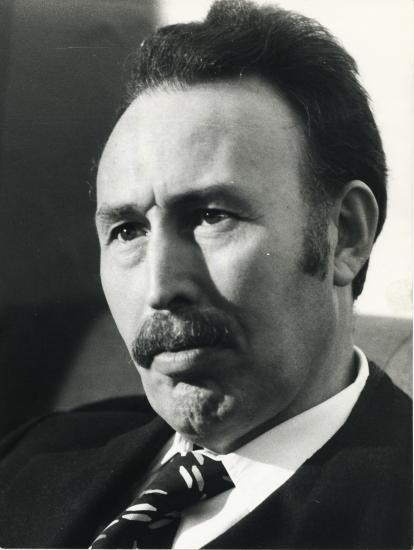
Candidate	Houari Boumediene
Party	FLN
Popular vote	7,076,568
Percentage	99.46%
President before election
Houari Boumediene
FLN
Elected President
Houari Boumediene
FLN

Presidential elections were held in Algeria on 10 December 1976. Incumbent Houari Boumediene, leader of the National Liberation Front (the country's sole legal party), was the only candidate, and was elected unopposed with 99.46% of the vote.

== Results ==
Candidate	Party	Votes	%
Houari Boumediene	National Liberation Front	7,976,568	99.46
Against		43,242	0.54
Total		8,019,810	100.00
Valid votes		8,019,810	98.92
Invalid/blank votes		87,663	1.08
Total votes		8,107,473	100.00
Registered voters/turnout		8,352,147	97.07
Source: Nohlen et al.
