= Mouloud Hamrouche =

Algerian politician

- مولود حمروش

5th Prime Minister of Algeria
- In office 9 September 1989 – 5 June 1991
- Preceded by: Kasdi Merbah
- Succeeded by: Sid Ahmed Ghozali

Personal details
- Born: 3 January 1943 (age 83) Constantine, Algeria
- Party: National Liberation Front

Mouloud Hamrouche (Arabic: مولود حمروش; born 3 January 1943) was the head of government of Algeria from 9 September 1989 to 5 June 1991.

== Biography ==
He was born in Constantine, Algeria. He was a leading member of the FLN. However, after serving as head of government of Algeria he became involved in serious disputes with other party leaders who he said were too close to the army. He ran unsuccessfully as an independent in the 1999 presidential elections.

As prime minister in early 1991, he attempted to limit the power of the military and security forces and was for that reason forced from power in June.

A decade after the military dictatorship had denied the FIS its electoral victory, Hamrouche sympathetically described the events of 1991 as a period with its excesses necessary for a people who had just been "liberated" after "being prevented from speaking for 30 years."

Political offices
Preceded by Kasdi Merbah	Head of government of Algeria; 1989–1991	Succeeded by Sid Ahmed Ghozali
