= Abdelhamid Brahimi =

Prime Minister of Algeria from 1984 to 1988

- عبد الحميد براهيمي

3rd Prime Minister of Algeria
- In office 22 January 1984 – 5 November 1988
- President: Chadli Bendjedid
- Preceded by: Mohamed Ben Ahmed Abdelghani
- Succeeded by: Kasdi Merbah (as Head of Government)

Personal details
- Born: 2 April 1936 Constantine, Algeria, France
- Died: 15 August 2021 (aged 85) Algiers, Algeria
- Party: National Liberation Front (Algeria)
- Education: Ohio State University (PhD)
- Occupation: economist
- Known for: economic reforms

Abdelhamid Brahimi (Arabic: عبد الحميد براهيمي / ʿabdu l-ḥamīd Brāhīmī; 2 April 1936 – 15 August 2021) was an Algerian politician who first served as minister of planning before becoming the prime minister of Algeria under Chadli Bendjedid. He served as PM from 22 January 1984, until 5 November 1988.

== Early life ==
Brahimi was born on 2 April 1936 in Mila, and later served during the Algerian War of Independence in the ranks of the National Liberation Army.

== Political career ==
After the Algerian War of Independence, he was appointed wali of the wilaya of Annaba Province, and was later made representative of the gas company Sonatrach in the United States in 1976. He briefly taught at the University of Algiers until 1975. He then served as Minister of Planning, before becoming Prime Minister of Algeria from 1984 to 1988. During his time as prime minister, he identified himself with economic liberalism and accelerated the reform process, although he controversially introduced a Family Code which was alleged to represent Islamist pressure and not the scientific character which he had identified with. He later stated that the president had faced internal opposition from senior members in the FLN, which led to them looking for other candidates and increasing dissent. In response, Bendjedid purposefully instigated trouble in October 1988, which provoked a national crisis and led to Brahimi being sacked.

In the spring of 1990 he announced that the FLN's corruption in government had cost $26 billion, which the Islamic Salvation Front heavily promoted in the lead up to the elections in June 1990.

== Exile and return ==
After his ministerial role, he went into self-imposed exile in Great Britain for 26 years. He went into exile after fearing for his life due to death threats from other parties, and was unable to return as his Algerian passport was revoked. During his stay, he taught at various universities like Georgetown University and Washington University in St. Louis. He returned to Algeria in 2016 aboard a Royal Air Maroc plane, arriving in Houari Boumediene Airport. He died on 15 August 2021 in the Central Army Hospital in Algiers.

Political offices
| Preceded by Mohamed Ben Ahmed Abdelghani | Prime Minister of Algeria; 1984–1988 | Succeeded by Kasdi Merbah |
