= Mohamed Ben Ahmed Abdelghani =

Prime Minister of Algeria from 1979 to 1984)

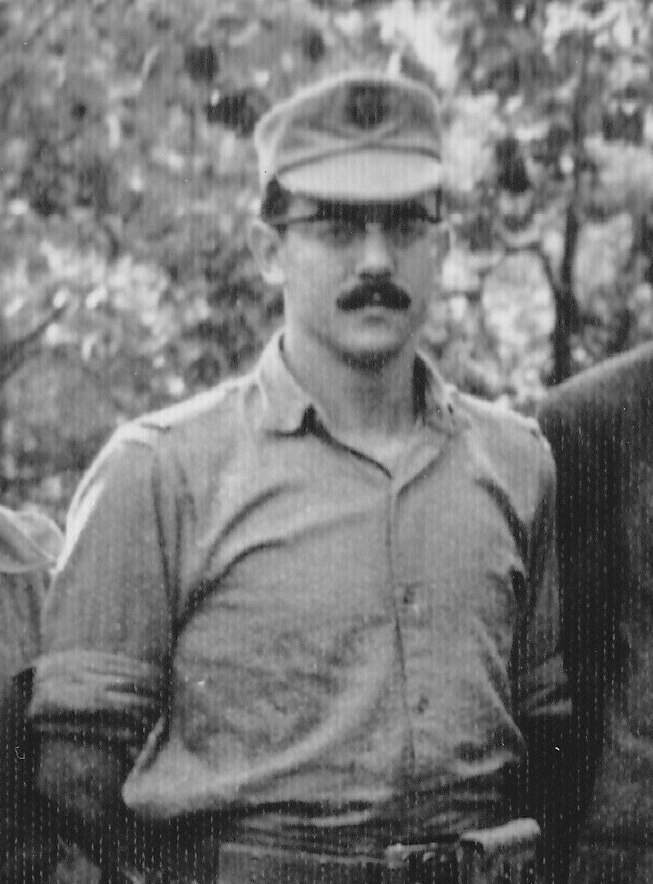
Abdelghani in 1961

Mohammed ben Ahmed Abdelghani (18 March 1927 – 22 September 1996) (Arabic: محمد بن أحمد عبد الغني) was the prime minister of Algeria under President Chadli Bendjedid from 8 March 1979 until 22 January 1984. Previously the position had been disestablished in 1963. He was an officer of the Algerian Army and commanded the 1st Military Region from 1962 to 1964. As of 2017, he has served the longest consecutive term of any prime minister in Algeria.

== Biography ==
Abdelghani was an active member of the Algerian People's Party and the Movement for the Triumph of Democratic Liberties. He participated in the events of May 8 1945, in which he was arrested for. He continued his university studies until 1956 due to a student strike; he halted studies to go to Cairo. He eventually joined the FLN and joined the Tlemcen coalition during a conflict between military staff and the provisional government. In 1957, he was the politico-military leader of the Aflou region, then commander of the southern zone. As head of the 1st Military Region after independence, he did not participate in the coup against President Ahmed Ben Bella in 1965 because of his good relations with the president. He was sent the day before on a mission to Korea.

In 1965, Abdelghani was a member of the Revolutionary Council, and eventually the president of the Revolutionary Court in 1968. In December of 1974, he was appointed to the post of the Minister of the Interior following the death of Ahmed Medeghri. He was appointed as the prime minister under the Bendjedid presidency in 1979, and kept that position until being appointed as the Minister of State to the Presidency of the Republic in 1984, which he served until 1988. He left in 1988 but reappeared in September of 1996 as a participant in the National Accord Conference.

He died of a heart attack on September 22, 1996 at the age of 69.

Political offices
Vacant Title last held by Ahmed Ben Bella	Prime Minister of Algeria; 1979–1984	Succeeded by Abdelhamid Brahimi
