= 1965 Algerian coup d'état =

Date	19 June 1965
Location	Algiers, Algeria 36°45′14″N 3°3′32″E
Result	Coup attempt succeeds with minimum disruption.: President Ahmed Ben Bella removed from office.; Defence Minister Houari Boumédiène installed as Chairman of the Revolutionary Council.

Belligerents
Houari Boumédiène; Tahar Zbiri; Abdelaziz Bouteflika	Ahmed Ben Bella (surrendered); Protesters; Supported by: Cuba; United Arab Republic; Yugoslavia

Casualties and losses
- No casualties reported.
- Nexus of coup in Algiers (marked green), Algeria

The 1965 Algerian coup d'état, also called the Revolutionary Correction, brought Colonel Houari Boumédiène to power as Chairman of the Revolutionary Council in Algeria. The bloodless coup d'état saw Algeria's first President, Ahmed Ben Bella, arrested and his closest supporters imprisoned by Boumédiène and his allies, principally in the People's National Army, the country’s armed forces. The arrest of Ben Bella occurred on 19 June 1965.

== Background ==
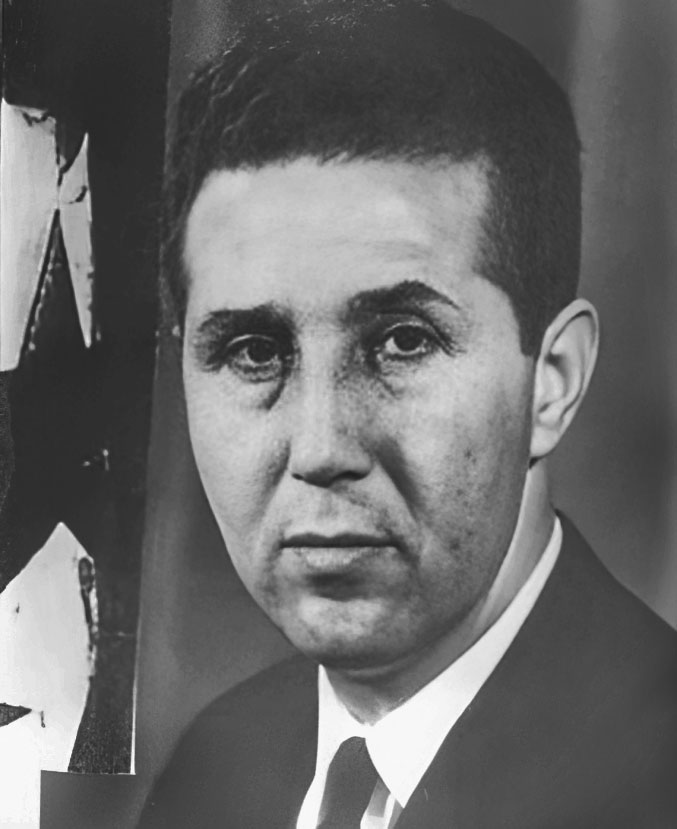
Ahmed Ben Bella, first president of the Algerian Republic.

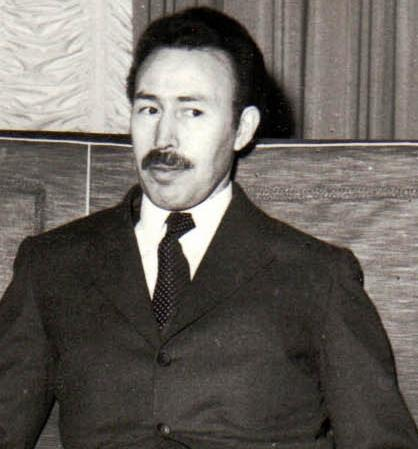
Houari Boumédiène, at the time Algerian Minister of Defence.

Following the Algerian War of Independence (1954–1962), Ahmed Ben Bella was elected as Prime Minister of Algeria with the help of then Chief of Staff Houari Boumédiène and the National Liberation Army (French:Armée de libération nationale - ALN) in September 1962, ousting former Prime Minister Benyoucef Benkhedda. Owing to his support of Ben Bella, Boumédiène was appointed Defense Minister by Ben Bella (and remained in this position until 1976).

From 1962 to 1965, initially as Prime Minister then as President after he won election to the post in September 1963, Ben Bella governed in an often erratic manner and centralized more and more government institutions by appointing himself the Secretary General of the National Liberation Front (French: Front de libération nationale - FLN), the governing political party; minister of the Interior; and the head of other bodies. Concerns over Ben Bella's demagogic behavior pervaded the Algerian government, with many government cadres coming to Boumédiène to voice their worries and complaints about the President.

Boumédiène spent time traveling in early 1965, making trips to Baghdad, Cairo, and Moscow. In Cairo, he represented Algeria at a summit of Arab countries and met with leaders of the Soviet Union in Moscow. In April 1965, Ben Bella ordered local police to report directly to him rather than through the normal channels in the Ministry of Interior. The interior minister, Ahmed Medeghri, one of Boumédiène's closest associates, resigned in protest. By late May, Boumédiène had begun having serious conversations with leading government figures, mostly in the Algerian Land Forces (the country’s army) on removing Ben Bella. The three central initial conspirators allied to Boumédiène were Abdelkader Chabou, Djamel, and Hocine, however by early June the circle of conspirators had grown to include Chief of Staff of the People's National Army Tahar Zbiri; the commander of the 1st Military Region (l'Algerois); and other regional officers throughout Algeria.

Final impetuses for the coup include:

- Ben Bella's announcement on 12 June of a politburo meeting to be held on the 19th. The purpose of the meeting was to discuss the reorganization of the armed forces and cabinet, and reshuffle the military leadership. He did not specify who was to be replaced, which effectively announced to all of those government officials that they were in danger of losing their positions if they did not act quickly.
- Ben Bella's plans for the armed forces; since independence, the ALN's successor the People's National Army had been the military of Algeria, but regional militias also existed. Ben Bella drafted plans to expand the people's militias while simultaneously reducing the role of the military.
- Ben Bella's plans for the removal of minister for foreign affairs and Boumédiène ally, Abdelaziz Bouteflika (who later became President of Algeria, in 1999). Bouteflika was scheduled to be removed on the 22nd, just three days after the coup took place.
- Ben Bella's current location: he had left Algiers for the city of Oran on 12 June, which gave Boumédiène time to organize the coup. Ben Bella gave a speech in Oran on the 17th, and returned to Algiers on the 18th, only hours before the coup was to be executed.

By mid June, there was a feeling of emergency within the army, leading many commanders to agree to execute a plan that they had no real knowledge of. The coup plan was designed carefully, with Boumédiène's goal being to execute "the most elegant coup d'etat" in recent memory. A friend of Ben Bella attempted to warn him about the coup on the 16th, but Ben Bella dismissed him. "Marionnettes (puppets) such as them are not capable of carrying out a coup," he replied.

== Coup ==
On the evening of 18 June 1965, the leaders of the coup set the plan to remove Ben Bella in motion. That night, Boumédiène remained at his office where he supervised the coup execution that was broadly entrusted to commander Chabou, one of the first conspirators. As president, Ben Bella took residence at a place named the ‘Villa Joly’, located in Algiers. Typically, guards of the Compagnies nationales de sécurité (CNS), a component of the Algerian police force, protected the compound and the guards changed shifts at 8:00 pm every night; however, on 18 June Ahmed Draia, director of security, ensured that the new guards for the night shift were djounoud loyal to the military.

At 1:00 am, Boumédiène ordered tanks to be deployed throughout Algiers at strategic positions such as Grande Poste d'Alger, Radio-Télévision Algérienne, and Place de l'Émir-Abdelkader (the seat of the FLN at the time). The film The Battle of Algiers was being shot in the capital at the time, and many onlookers thought the military movement was connected to shooting the movie. Around 1:30 am, Tahar Zbiri, Said Abid, and colonel Abbes approached Villa Joly and were let in by the replacement guards at the entrance. Tahar Zbiri awoke Ben Bella, who slept on the sixth floor, and stated “On behalf of the Revolutionary Council, I have orders to arrest you on the charge of high treason.” The three military officers allowed Ben Bella to get dressed and then took him in a car to a location in the city of Maison-Carrée, 20 kilometers from Algiers, where he was placed under house arrest. Zbiri reported to Boumédiène: "Mission accomplished." Ben Bella would remain under house arrest until 1980 and would not return publicly to Algeria until 1990.

By 3:00 am on 19 June, the coup was effectively over with no bloodshed.

== Aftermath ==
On 19 June, Boumédiène gave an address broadcast on radio, in which he stated that the removal of Ben Bella was necessary to ensure continuity of the revolution. He accused Ben Bella of attempting to hijack the Afro-Asian Unity Conference for personal gain without regard to the other countries of the organization. Boumédiène announced that Algeria would not be able to host the conference under these circumstances but expressed his support for the ideals of the organization. (However, the Pan-African Cultural Festival (PANAF) with attendees from all over the world, including the Black Panthers of the US, would be organized by the Boumédiène administration in 1969 and held in Algiers.) In the speech he also called Ben Bella a charlatan and an adventurist, possibly a reference to Ben Bella's support of Nigerien rebels using Algeria as a safe haven for their activity against the Diori government in Niger, something Boumédiène never supported. Another radio announcement by Kaïd Ahmed on the same day stated that the "instability, demagogy, anarchy, lies, and improvisation" of Ben Bella's government were over.

On 19 and 20 June people began protesting against the coup and chanting pro-Ben Bella slogans; the new government attempted to disperse the protests, but the local police, not elements of the military, were used to maintain order in most instances. In Algiers, between two and three thousand people roamed the streets, calling for the assassination of Boumédiène. Radio broadcasts repeatedly called for calm, and sometimes uttered threats against the protesters. Several people were arrested, including 50 French far-left supporters of Ben Bella.

On 5 July, Boumédiène announced the creation of the Revolutionary Council (RC) with himself serving as president of the RC, Minister of Defense, and President of the Council of Ministers. Boumédiène announced to the Algerian people that the RC's two main goals were economic self-reliance and independence from foreign influence; internally the RC sought also to end regionalism, solidify the state, and to reform the wilayahs (the provinces of Algeria).

Boumédiène's first travel abroad was in September 1965, to an Arab summit in Casablanca Morocco, followed by a summit for the Organisation of African Unity (today the African Union) in Accra, Ghana in October. The RC began the country's first census in December 1965, at the same time Boumédiène visited Moscow for the second time that year. On the anniversary of the coup, he addressed the Algerian people again and reemphasized his goals of ending regionalism, moving progressively toward socialism, keeping Algeria 'Algerian', resisting foreign influence, supporting former freedom fighters, and removing remaining French bases from the Sahara. One year after the coup, Boumédiène pursued these goals by visiting the Eastern, Western, Tiaret, and Oasis wilayahs and progressively nationalizing industries such as mining to guard against foreign interference. He also reorganized the FLN in June 1966. In 1965, there were 2 million unemployed workers and Boumédiène pursued a realist-based policy approach to stabilize the Algerian economy, state, and society while building "a socialism which conforms to the realities of the country."

== Other sources ==
- Ben Bella revient [Ben Bella is coming back] (1982). Jean Picollec: Paris, France. ISBN 978-2864770435
