= Chadli Bendjedid =

President of Algeria from 1979 to 1992

- الشاذلي بن جديد
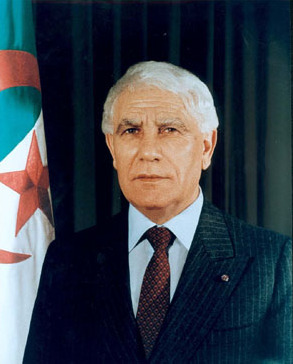
- Official portrait, 1979

3rd President of Algeria
- In office 9 February 1979 – 11 January 1992
- Prime Minister: Mohamed Ben Ahmed Abdelghani; Abdelhamid Brahimi; Kasdi Merbah; Mouloud Hamrouche; Sid Ahmed Ghozali
- Preceded by: Rabah Bitat (Interim)
- Succeeded by: Abdelmalek Benhabyles (Acting)

Minister of Defence
- In office 8 March 1979 – 25 July 1990

Personal details
- Born: 14 April 1929 Bouteldja, French Algeria
- Died: 6 October 2012 (aged 83) Algiers, Algeria
- Party: FLN
- Spouse: Halima Ben Aissa
- Children: 4
- Profession: Military officer, politician

Military service
- Allegiance: FLN (1954–1962); Algeria (1962–1979)
- Branch/service: ALN; Algerian Land Forces
- Years of service: 1954–1979
- Rank: Colonel
- Battles/wars: Algerian War; Sand War

Chadli Bendjedid (Arabic: الشاذلي بن جديد; ALA-LC: ash-Shādhilī bin Jadīd; 14 April 1929 – 6 October 2012) was an Algerian military officer and politician who served as the third President of Algeria. His presidential term of office ran from 9 February 1979 to 11 January 1992.

A combatant during the Algerian War, he was a member of the Revolutionary Council from 1965 to 1976 and was appointed Colonel in 1969.

He was appointed Secretary General of the National Liberation Front (FLN) in January 1979 and was elected president the following month. Bendjedid would win re-elections without competition in 1984 and 1989. He resigned from the presidency in January 1992 following a disputed election and military coup, leading to the Algerian Civil War.

He remained under house arrest until 1999 and died of cancer in 2012 at the age of 83.

== Career ==
=== Early life and career ===
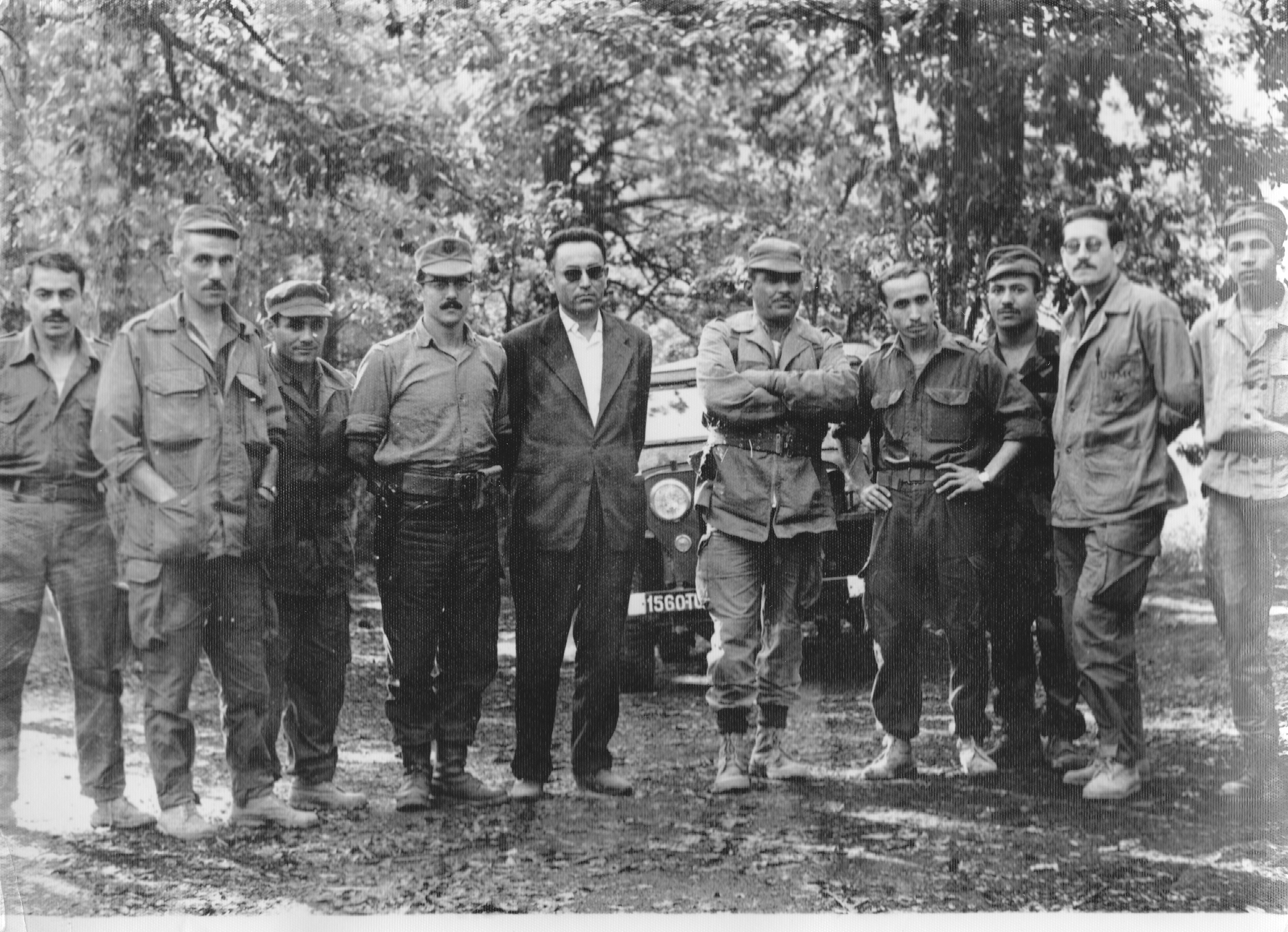
Bendjedid during the war of independence in 1961

Bendjedid was born in Bouteldja on 14 April 1929. He served in the French Army as a non-commissioned officer and fought in Indochina. He defected to the National Liberation Front (FLN) at the beginning of the Algerian War of Independence in 1954. A protégé of Houari Boumediene, Bendjedid was rewarded with the command of the Constantine Military Region and Oran in 1964. After independence he rose through the ranks, becoming head of the 2nd Military Region in 1964 and Colonel in 1969. He commanded the 2nd Military Region from 1964 to 1978, and there supervised the evacuation of French military forces stationed at Mers el-Kebir in conformity with the Évian Accords, and the monitoring of the frontier between Algeria and Morocco which was the site of significant tension.

=== Ascent to presidency ===
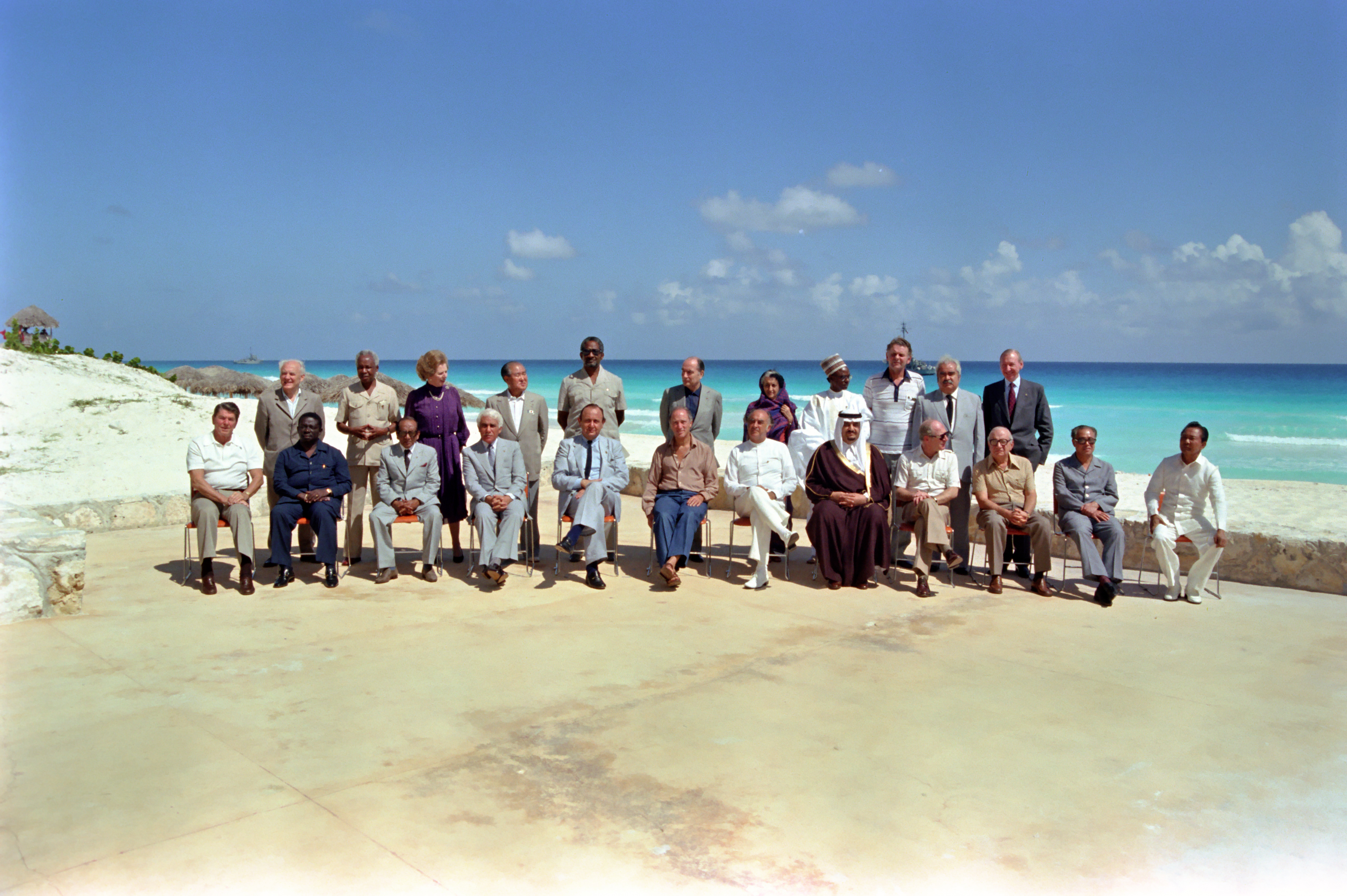
Bendjedid with other heads of state at the Cancun Summit in 1981

Bendjedid served as Minister of Defence from November 1978 to February 1979 and became president following the death of Boumédiènne.

Bendjedid was a compromise candidate who came to power after the party leadership and presidency was contested at the fourth FLN congress held on 27 - 31 January 1979. The most likely to succeed Boumediene were Mohammad Salah Yahiaoui and Abdelaziz Bouteflika: the latter had served as a foreign secretary at the United Nations for sixteen years, was a prominent member of the Oujda group and was regarded as a pro-Western liberal. Yahiaoui was closely affiliated with the communists, permitting the Parti de l'Avant-Garde Socialiste (PAGS) to acquire jurisdiction over the mass trade union and youth organisations.

In office, Bendjedid reduced the state's role in the economy and eased government surveillance of citizens. In the late 1980s, with the economy failing due to rapidly falling oil prices, tension rose between elements of the regime who supported Bendjedid's economic liberalisation policies and those who wanted a return to the statist model.

In October 1988, youth marches protesting the regime's austerity policies and shouting slogans against Bendjedid, evolved into massive rioting now known as the 1988 October Riots which spread to Oran, Annaba and other cities; the military's brutal suppression of the rioters left several hundred dead. Perhaps as a political survival strategy, Bendjedid then called for and began to implement a transition towards multi-party democracy. However, in 1992 the military intervened to stop elections from bringing the Islamist Front Islamique du Salut (FIS) to power, forcing Bendjedid out of office and sparking a long and bloody Algerian Civil War.

== Post-presidency life ==
Bendjedid was put under house arrest in Oran but freed in 1999 after the rise to the presidency of Abdelaziz Bouteflika. In a 2002 interview, he revealed his willingness to accept the results of the 1991 poll and work with the FIS while avoiding their takeover of all government institutions. He believed the constitution gave him the power to do so, but he failed to win over the support of the military establishment.

He returned to the public eye in late 2008 when he gave a controversial speech at a conference in Al-Tarif, his hometown. The publication of his memoirs was announced on 1 November 2012, coinciding with the 58th anniversary of the outbreak of the War of National Liberation.

== Illness and death ==
Bendjedid was hospitalised in Paris in January 2012 for cancer treatment and returned to hospital again in May and October 2012. On 3 October 2012, Bendjedid was admitted to the intensive care unit of a military hospital in Ain-Naadja in Algiers. State-run media announced that he died of cancer on 6 October 2012. He was buried at the El Alia Cemetery.

== Honours ==
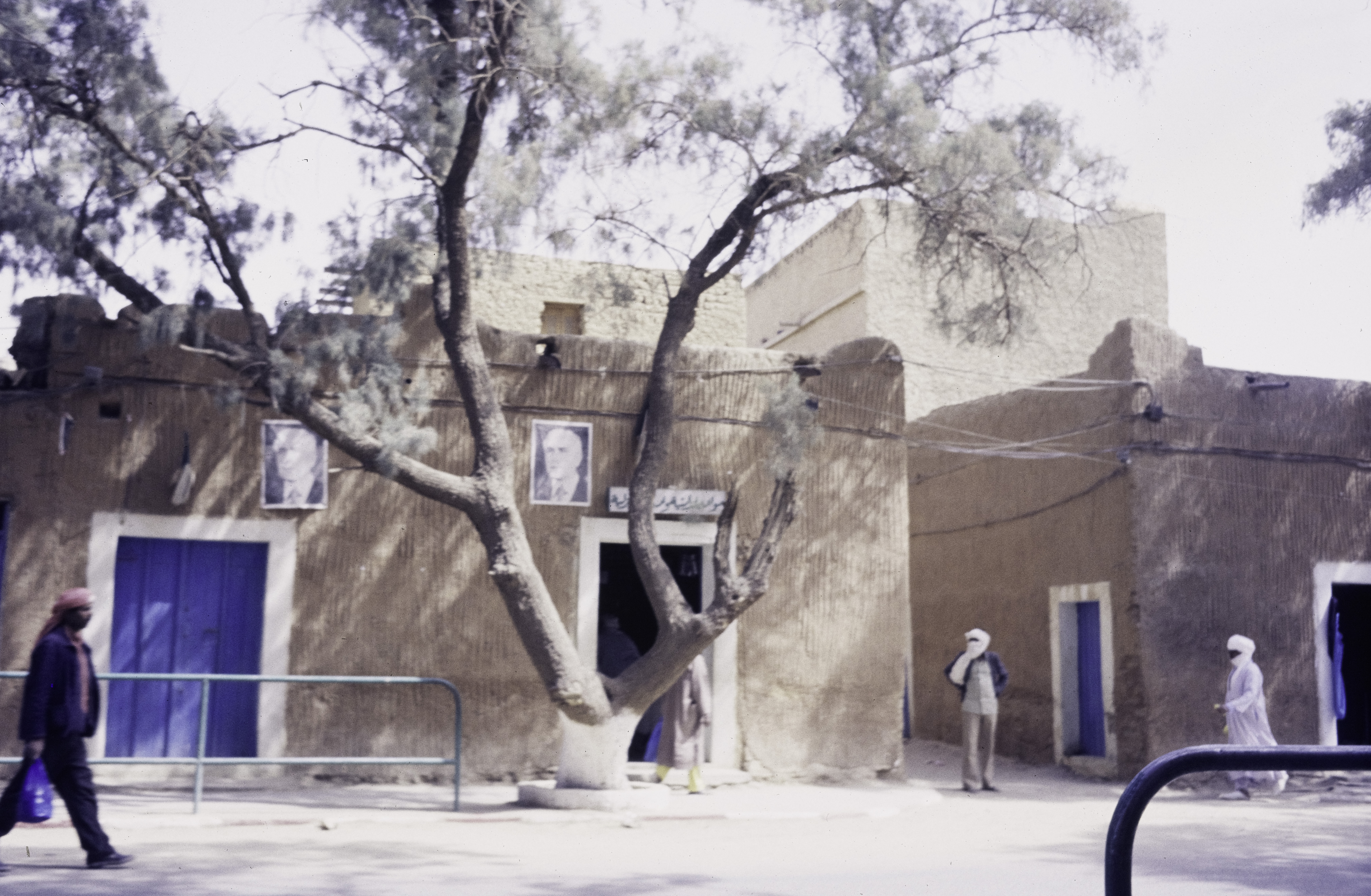
Chadli Bendjedid's portrait in the streets, 1984

=== National honours ===
- Grand Master of the National Order of Merit

=== Foreign honours ===
- (Socialist Federal Republic of Yugoslavia) Order of the Yugoslav Great Star (1982)
- (Czechoslovakia) Grand Cross of the Order of the White Lion (1984)
- (Cuba) Order of José Martí (1985)

Political offices
Preceded by Rabah Bitat; Interim	President of Algeria; 1979–1992	Succeeded by Abdelmalek Benhabyles; Acting
