= Houari Boumédiène =

Leader of Algeria from 1965 to 1978

- هواري بومدين
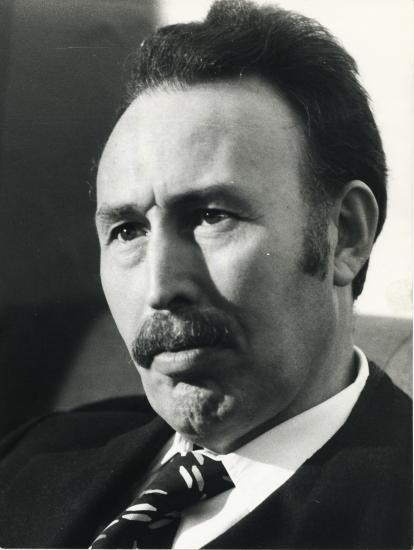
- Boumédiène in 1978

2nd President of Algeria
- In office 10 December 1976 – 27 December 1978
- Preceded by: Himself (as Chairman of the Revolutionary Council)
- Succeeded by: Chadli Bendjedid

Chairman of the Revolutionary Council
- In office 19 June 1965 – 10 December 1976
- Preceded by: Ahmed Ben Bella (as President)
- Succeeded by: Himself (as President)

4th Secretary General of the Non-Aligned Movement
- In office 5 September 1973 – 16 August 1976
- Preceded by: Kenneth Kaunda
- Succeeded by: William Gopallawa

6th Chairperson of the Organisation of African Unity
- In office 13 September 1968 – 6 September 1969
- Preceded by: Mobutu Sese Seko
- Succeeded by: Ahmadou Ahidjo

Chief of Staff of National Liberation Army
- In office 1960–1962

Chief of West Staff of National Liberation Army
- In office 1958–1960

Chief of the 5th Wilaya of National Liberation Army
- In office 1957–1958
- Preceded by: Abdelhafid Boussouf
- Succeeded by: Benali Boudghène

Personal details
- Born: Mohamed ben Brahim Boukharouba; 23 August 1932 Guelma, French Algeria
- Died: 27 December 1978 (aged 46) Algiers, Algeria
- Party: National Liberation Front
- Spouse: Anissa al-Mansali (m. 1973)

Military service
- Allegiance: FLN (1955–1962); Algeria (1962–1976)
- Branch/service: National Liberation Army (1955–1962); Algerian People's National Army (1962–1976)
- Years of service: 1955–1976
- Rank: General of Army
- Battles/wars: Algerian War; Sand War

Houari Boumédiène (Note: Also transcribed Boumediene and Boumedienne; Arabic: هواري بومدين, romanized: Hawwārī Būmadyan.) (born Mohammed ben Brahim Boukharouba; (Note: Arabic: محمد بن إبراهيم بوخروبة, romanized: Muḥammad ibn Ibrāhīm Būkharūba.) 23 August 1932 – 27 December 1978) was an Algerian military officer, revolutionary, and politician who was the second head of state of independent Algeria from 1965 until his death in 1978. He served as Chairman of the Revolutionary Council of Algeria from 19 June 1965 until 12 December 1976 and thereafter as president of Algeria until his death. At age 32, Boumédiène remains the youngest person to serve as head of state of Algeria.

Born in Guelma, Boumédiène was educated at the Islamic Institute in Constantine. In 1955, he joined the National Liberation Front (FLN) and adopted the nom de guerre Houari Boumédiène. By 1960, he had risen through the organization's ranks to become the commander of the FLN's military wing. After the FLN's victory over the French in the Algerian War of Independence in 1962, Boumédiène became the Minister of Defense in Algeria's new government.

In June 1965, Boumédiène overthrew President Ben Bella in a bloodless coup before proceeding to abolish Algeria's parliament along with its constitution and ultimately becoming the country's acting head of state. In the 1970s, Boumédiène initiated a gradual restoration of parliamentarism and civil institutions in Algeria. This process ended with the adoption of the new constitution in 1976. The presidency was reinstated, and Boumédiène emerged as the sole candidate in an election later that year, winning with 99.46 per cent of the votes. Subsequently, he pursued Arab socialist and Pan-Arabist policies. He was also strongly opposed to Israel and offered logistic assistance to anti-colonial movements and freedom fighters across the Arab world and Africa.

From the beginning of 1978, Boumédiène appeared less and less in public. He died on December 27, 1978, after unsuccessful treatment for a rare form of blood cancer, Waldenström's macroglobulinemia. His funeral was attended by two million mourners. He was succeeded as president by Chadli Bendjedid.

== Early life and War of Independence ==
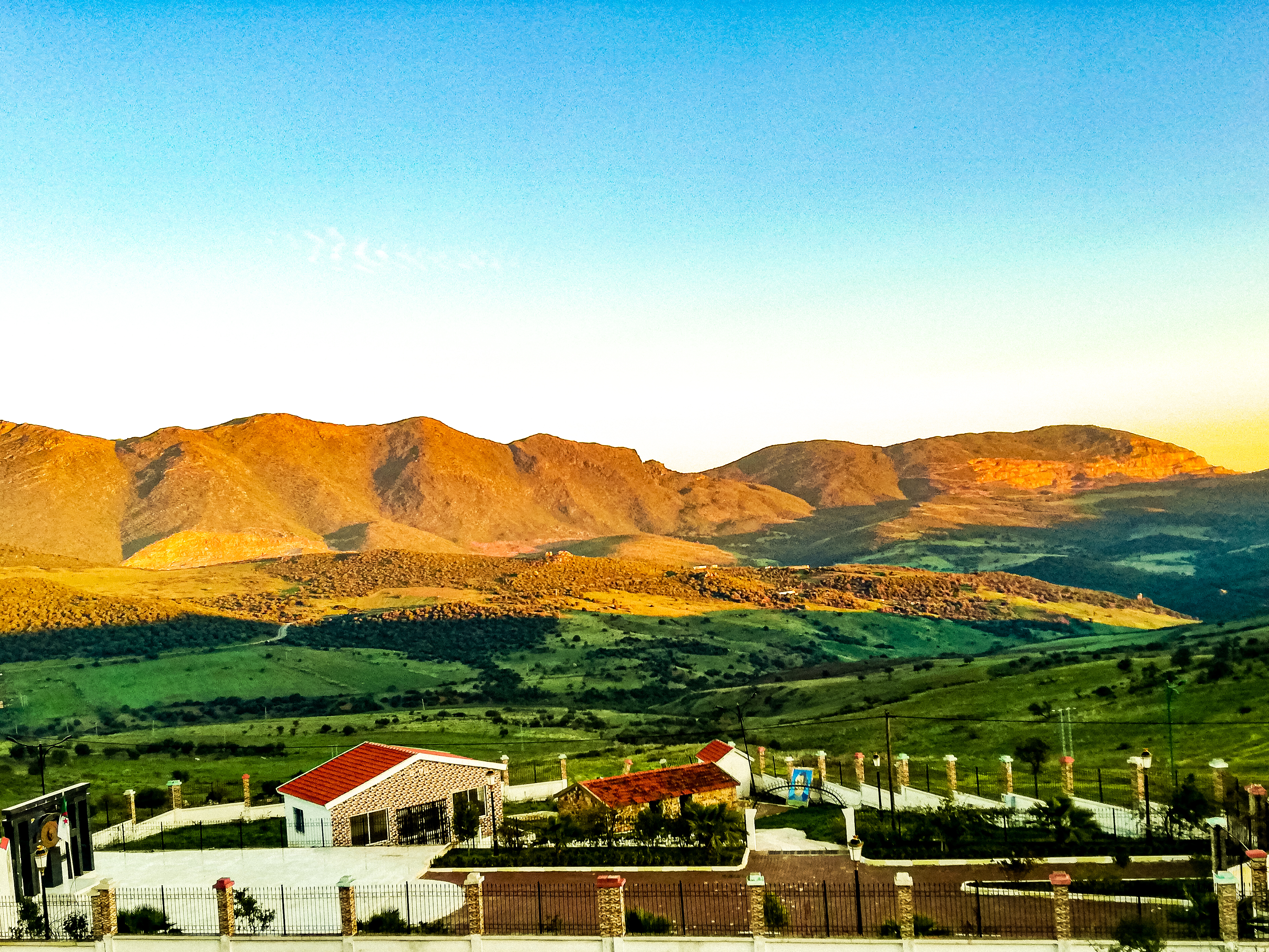
The house where Boumédiène was born in Douar Beni Aadi

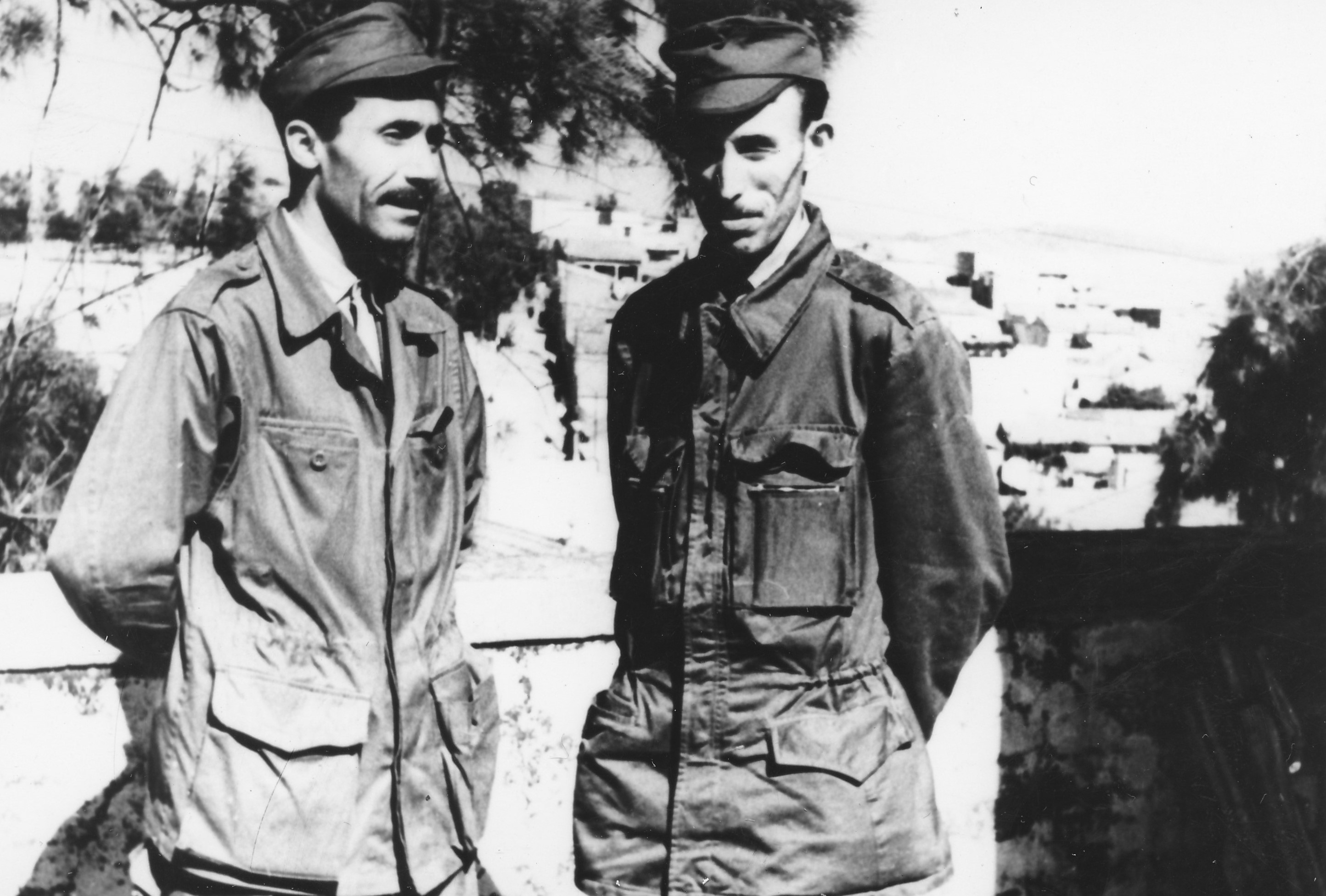
Boumédiène during the Algerian War of Independence

Not much is known about Boumédiène's early life. His place of birth variously appear as Guelma, the nearby village of Clauzel, or Héliopolis, and his date of birth as 16 August 1925, 23 August 1927, or (in most sources) as 1932. His father said in a 1965 interview that his date of birth was 23 August 1932. His birth name was Mohammed ben Brahim Boukherouba, and his father was a penniless wheat-farmer and was an Arab and strict Muslim who did not speak French. According to the Encyclopaedia of Islam, his family is Arabic-speaking and of Berber origins. He was educated at a Quranic school in Guelma until he was 14, then an Arabic secondary school in Constantine.

In 1952, when France was recruiting Algerians to fight in the Indochina War, Boumédiène went to Cairo, where he studied at the Al-Azhar University. It was there he first met Ahmed Ben Bella. He joined the National Liberation Front (FLN) in the Algerian War of Independence in 1955, adopting Houari Boumédiène as his nom-de-guerre (from Sidi Boumediène, the name of the patron saint of the city of Tlemcen in western Algeria, where he served as an officer during the war, and Sidi El Houari, the patron saint of nearby Oran). He reached the rank of colonel, then the highest rank in the FLN forces, and from 1960 he was chief of staff of the ALN, the FLN's military wing. In 1973, he married Anissa el-Mansali, a lawyer.

== After independence ==
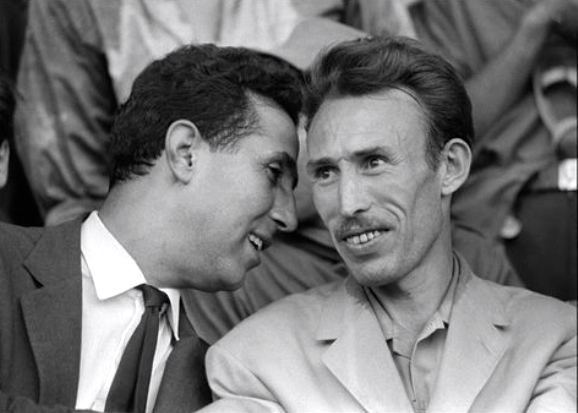
Boumediene with Ahmed Ben Bella in 1962.

In 1962, after a referendum, Algeria declared its independence, a move affirmed by the French government. Boumédiène and Ahmed Ben Bella overthrew the provisional government of Benyoucef Benkhedda with support from the ALN in 1962. Boumédiène headed a powerful military faction within the government and was made defence minister by the Algerian president Ahmed Ben Bella, whose ascent to power he had assisted as chief of staff. Boumédiène was also appointed as Vice President of Algeria in September 1963. He grew increasingly distrustful of Ben Bella's erratic style of government and ideological puritanism, and in June 1965, Boumédiène seized power in a bloodless coup.

The country's constitution and political institutions were abolished, and he ruled through a Revolutionary Council of his own mostly military supporters. Many of them had been his companions during the war years, when he was based around the Moroccan border town of Oujda, which caused analysts to speak of the "Oujda Group". One prominent member of this circle was Boumédiène's long-time foreign minister, Abdelaziz Bouteflika, who served as Algeria's president from 1999 until 2019. Initially, he was seen as potentially a weak leader, with no significant power base except inside the army, and it was not known to what extent he commanded the officer corps. He remained Algeria's undisputed leader until his death in 1978. No significant internal challenges emerged from inside the government after the 1967 coup attempt. After the coup, he insisted on collective rule.

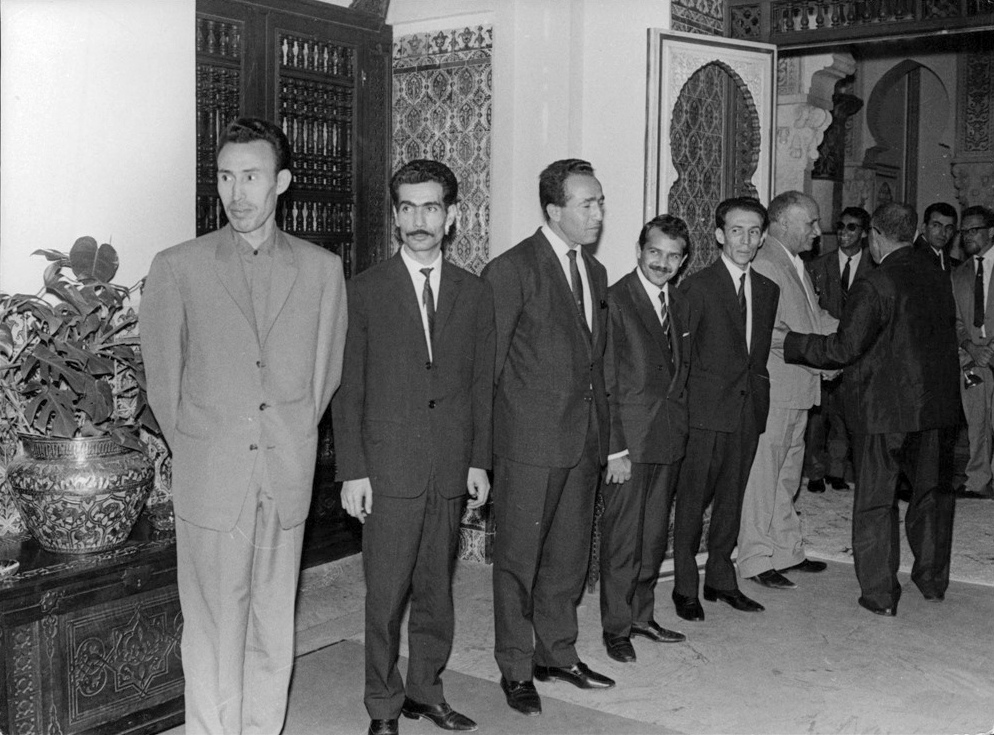
Houari Boumediene standing in a row with the other politicians, 1965.

== Domestic policy ==
1972 newsreel about Algeria under Boumédiène

Economically, Boumédiène turned away from Ben Bella's focus on rural Algeria and experiments in socialist cooperative businesses (l'autogestion). Instead, he opted for a more systematic and planned programme of state-driven industrialization. Algeria had virtually no advanced production at the time, but in 1971 Boumédiène nationalized the Algerian oil industry, increasing government revenue tremendously (and sparking intense protest from the French government). He then put the soaring oil and gas resources—enhanced by the oil price shock of 1973—into building heavy industry, hoping to make Algeria the Maghreb's industrial centre. His years in power were in fact marked by a reliable and consistent economic growth, but after his death, in the 1980s, the drop in oil prices and increasingly evident inefficiency of the country's state-run industries prompted a change in policy towards gradual economical liberalization. Boumédiène imposed Arab socialism as the state ideology and declared Islam the state religion. He was a strong supporter of Arabization and was more assertive than Ben Bella in Arabizing Algeria, especially between 1970 and 1977, and declared 1971 the year of Arabization.

In the 1970s, along with the expansion of state industry and oil nationalization, Boumédiène declared a series of socialist revolutions, and strengthened the leftist aspect of his administration. A side-effect of this was the rapprochement with the hitherto suppressed remnants of the Algerian Communist Party (the PAGS), whose members were now co-opted into the government, where it gained some limited intellectual influence, although without formal legalization of their party. Algeria formally remained a single-party state under the FLN.

Political stability reigned, however, as attempts at challenging the state were generally nipped in the bud. As chairman of the Revolutionary Command Council, Boumédiène and his associates ruled by decree. During the 1970s, constitutional rule was gradually reinstated and civilian political institutions were restored and reorganized. Efforts were made to revive activity within the FLN, and state institutions were reestablished systematically, starting with local assemblies and moving up through regional assemblies to the national level, with the election of a parliament. The process culminated with the adoption of a constitution (1976) that laid down Algeria's political structure. This was preceded by a period of relatively open debate on the merits of the government-backed proposal, although the constitution itself was then adopted in a state-controlled referendum with no major changes. The constitution reintroduced the office of president. As the leader of the FLN, Boumédiène was the sole candidate for president, and was confirmed in office in a December referendum.

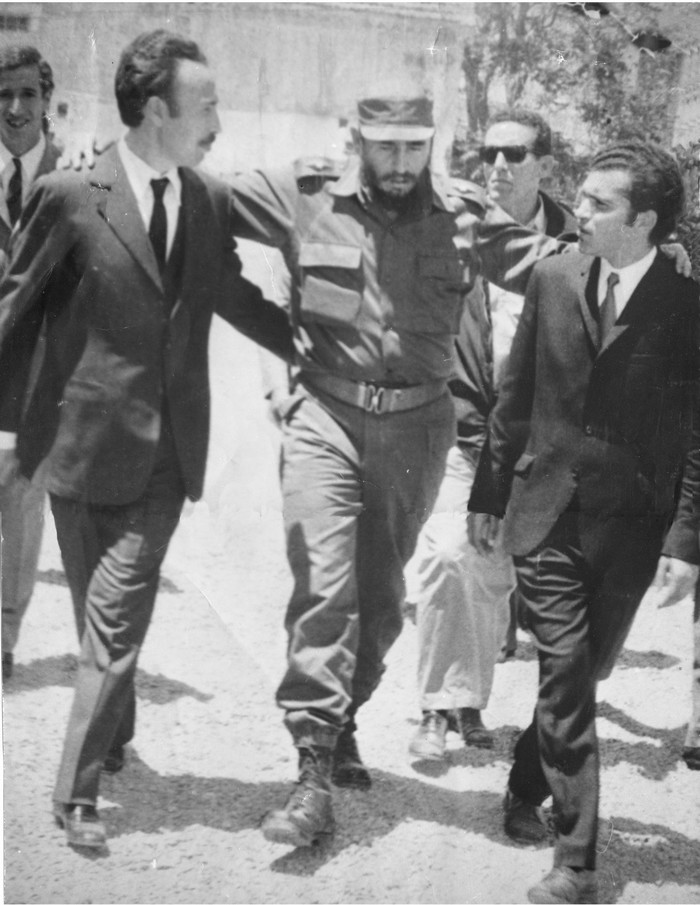
Boumediene with Cuban communist leader Fidel Castro in 1972.

At the time of his death, later that year, the political and constitutional order in Algeria was virtually entirely of FLN design. This structure remained largely unchanged until the late 1980s, when political pluralism was introduced and the FLN lost its role as dominant single party. (Many basic aspects of this system and the Boumédiène-era constitution are still in place.) However, throughout Boumédiène's era, the military remained the dominant force in the country's politics, and military influence permeated civilian institutions such as the FLN, parliament and government, undercutting the constitutionalization of the country's politics. Intense financial or political rivalries between military and political factions persisted, and was kept in check and prevented from destabilizing the government mainly by Boumédiène's overwhelming personal dominance of both the civilian and military sphere.

Algeria experienced significant economic and social development under his government. Between 1962 and 1982, the Algerian population increased from 10 to 20 million people and, massively rural before independence, 45% of the population was urbanized. Annual per capita income, which did not exceed 2,000 francs in 1962, exceeded 11,000 francs twenty years later, while the enrolment rate varied from 75 to 95% depending on the region, far from the 10% of French Algeria. However, Boumédiène's regime prioritized industrial development, which led it neglecting agriculture.

== Foreign policy ==
Boumédiène pursued a policy of non-alignment, maintaining good relations with both the communist bloc and the capitalist nations, and promoting third-world cooperation. In the United Nations, he called for a unity built on equal status for western and ex-colonial nations, and brought about by a socialist-style change in political and trade relations. He sought to build a powerful third world bloc through the Non-Aligned Movement, in which he became a prominent figure. He unconditionally supported freedom fighters, justice and equality seekers. He offered logistic assistance to anti-colonial movements and other militant groups across Africa and the Arab world, including the PLO, ANC, SWAPO and other nations.

Algeria remained strongly opposed to Israel and a strong supporter of the Palestinian cause. In the early 1970s, Boumédiène famously said: "We are with Palestinians, whether they are the oppressed or the oppressor". Algeria reinforced the Arab coalition with air forces against Israel in the Six-Day War in 1967, and sent an armored brigade of 150 tanks in the Yom Kippur War in 1973, where Algerian fighter jets participated in attacks together with Egyptians and Iraqis. It also deposited $200 million with the Soviet Union to finance arms purchases for Egypt and Syria. In response to the US support for Israel in the Six-Day War, Algeria severed diplomatic ties with the United States. It participated in the 1973 oil embargo after the US supported Israel in the Yom Kippur War. In response to Egypt's normalization of ties with Israel, Algeria along with other Arab countries condemned Anwar Sadat and severed ties with Egypt in 1977.

Algeria bought the majority of arms from the Soviet Union. A significant regional event was his 1975 pledge of support for Western Saharan self-determination, admitting Sahrawi refugees and the Polisario Front national liberation movement to Algerian territory, after Morocco and Mauritania claimed control over the territory. This ended the possibility of mending relations with Morocco, already sour after the 1963 Sand War, although there had been a modest thaw in relations during his first time in power. The heightened Moroccan-Algerian rivalry and the still unsolved Western Sahara question became a defining feature of Algerian foreign policy ever since and remains so today.

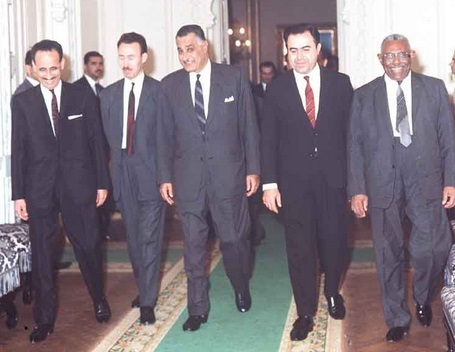
Arab heads of state in Cairo to discuss previous talks with Soviet leaders. From left to right: Iraqi president Abdul Rahman Arif, Boumediene, Egyptian president Gamal Abdel Nasser, Syrian president Nureddin al-Atassi and Sudanese president Ismail al-Azhari, July 1967

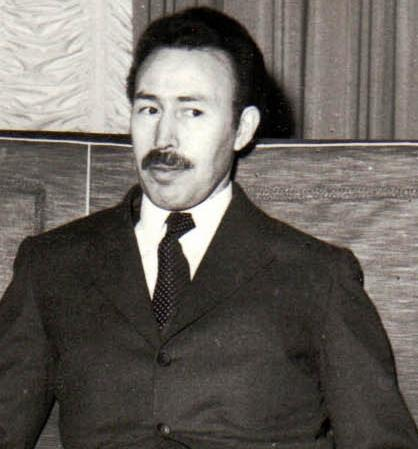
Boumédiène in 1972

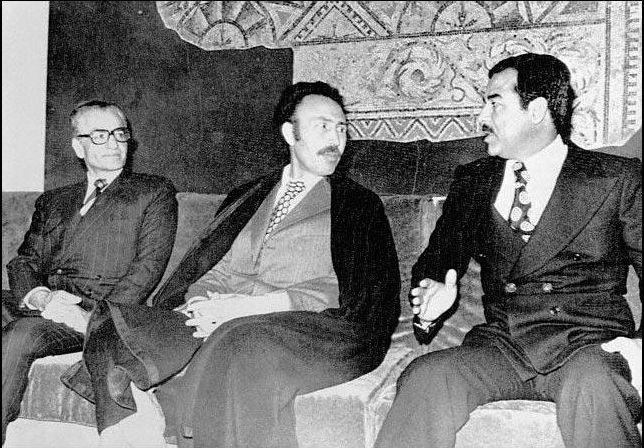
The 1975 Algiers Agreement was signed by (left to right) the Shah of Iran Mohammad Reza Pahlavi, Boumédiène, and the Iraqi vice-president Saddam Hussein

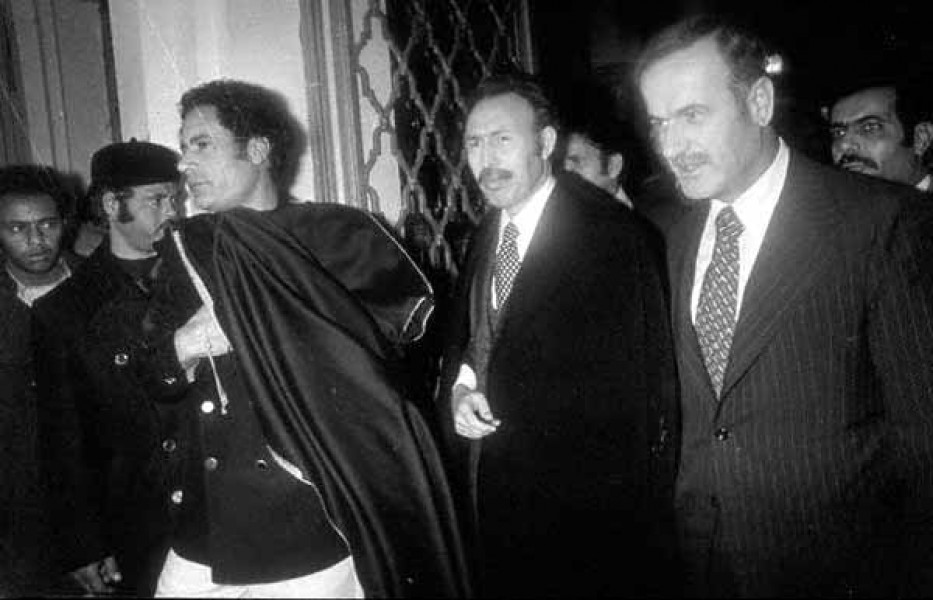
Libyan Leader Muammar Gaddafi, Boumediene and Syrian President Hafez al-Assad in Tripoli, 1977

== Death and funeral ==
In 1978, his appearances became increasingly rare. After lingering in a coma for 39 days, he died in Algiers of a rare blood disease, Waldenström's macroglobulinemia, following unsuccessful treatment in Moscow. Rumors about his being assassinated or poisoned have surfaced occasionally in Algerian politics, especially after two other participants of the 1975 Algiers Agreement events — the Shah (d. 1980) and his Minister of Court Asadollah Alam (d. 1978) — also died of cancers around the same time. The death of Boumédiène left a power vacuum in Algeria which could not easily be filled; a series of military conclaves eventually agreed to sidestep the competing left- and right-wing contenders, and designate the highest-ranking military officer, Colonel Chadli Bendjedid, as a compromise selection.

Boumédiène's state funeral took place in Algiers on 29 December 1978. A crowd of two million mourners attended, breaking through police cordons and blocking the routes. The Algerian government promised to continue his socialist revolution and declared 40 days of official mourning. Despite their differences over the Camp David Accords, Egyptian president Anwar Sadat paid tribute to Boumédiène and said he received the news of his death "with sorrow and sadness" and sent a delegation to attend the funeral. PLO leader Yasser Arafat attended the funeral with the second in command of his Fatah guerrilla organization, Abu Iyad, who had built close relations with Boumédiène. US President Jimmy Carter expressed deep regret and said that Boumédiène "played an outstanding role in Algeria's long struggle for independence. His devotion to duty and his contributions as an international statesman are well known. But it is for his efforts to help create and strengthen an independent, self-sufficient Algerian nation that he will be most remembered." A large United States delegation attended, which included Muhammad Ali. The Soviet press praised Boumédiène as "a great friend of the Soviet Union" and that he had "made a great contribution to Algeria's social and economic progress."

== Awards and honors ==
- Algeria:
  - National Order of Merit
- Cuba:
  - Order of José Martí (1974)
- Morocco:
  - Grand Cordon of the Order of Ouissam Alaouite

== See also ==
- Houari Boumediene Airport, an airport near Algiers named after him.
- Houari Boumédienne District, a district in his native Guelma Province named after him.
- El Mouradia Palace

== General bibliography ==
- Balta, Paul, and Claudine Roulleau, La Stratégie de Boumédiène, Simbad, 1978
- Francos, Ania, and Jean-Pierre Séréni, Un Algérien nommé Boumédiène, Stock, coll. Les Grands Leaders, 1976
- Minces, Juliette, L'Algérie de Boumediène, Presses de la Cité, 1978

Political offices
Preceded by Ahmed Ben Bella	President of Algeria; 1965–1978	Succeeded by Rabah Bitat; Interim
