= List of presidents of the People's National Assembly =

President of the People's National Assembly
- Logo of the People's National Assembly
- Incumbent; Khalida Boufedeche since 28 July 2026
- Appointer: Deputies
- Term length: 5 years
- Inaugural holder: Ferhat Abbas
- Formation: 25 September 1962
- Website: www.apn.dz/en/

The president of the People's National Assembly of Algeria is the presiding officer of that body. From the creation of the Council of the Nation in 1997, the People's National Assembly is the lower house of the Parliament of Algeria.

== List ==
=== Legend ===
Political parties:

FLN
RND
El Binaa
Independent

Note: The tables below show the terms of office for the Presidents of the National Assembly.

| Name | Portrait | Took office | Left office | Political party | Notes |
|---|---|---|---|---|---|
Presidents of the Constituent Assembly
| 1 | Ferhat Abbas | September 1962 | April 1963 | National Liberation Front | |
| 2 | El Hadj Benalla | September 1964 | June 1965 | National Liberation Front | |
Presidents of the People's National Assembly
| 3 | Rabah Bitat | April 1977 | October 1990 | National Liberation Front | |
| 4 | Abdelaziz Belkhadem | October 1990 | January 1992 | National Liberation Front | |
President of the National Consultative Council
| 5 | Redha Malek | January 1992 | January 1994 | Independent | |
President of the National Transitional Council
| 6 | Abdelkader Bensalah | May 1994 | May 1997 | Independent | |
Presidents of the People's National Assembly
| 7 | Abdelkader Bensalah | 14 June 1997 | June 2002 | National Rally for Democracy | |
| 8 | Karim Younes | 10 June 2002 | June 2004 | National Liberation Front | |
| 9 | Amar Saadani | June 2004 | May 2007 | National Liberation Front | |
| 10 | Abdelaziz Ziari | May 2007 | May 2012 | National Liberation Front | |
| 11 | Larbi Ould Khelifa | May 2012 | 23 May 2017 | National Liberation Front | |
| 12 | Saïd Bouhadja | 23 May 2017 | 10 October 2018 | National Liberation Front | |
| 13 | Mouad Bouchareb | 24 October 2018 | 2 July 2019 | National Liberation Front | |
| 14 | Slimane Chenine | 10 July 2019 | 18 February 2021 | National Construction Movement | |
| 15 | Ibrahim Boughali | 8 July 2021 | 28 July 2026 | Independent | |
| 16 | Khalida Boufedeche | 28 July 2026 | Incumbent | National Liberation Front | |
