= El Alia Cemetery =

Cemetery in Algeria

- مقبرة العالية
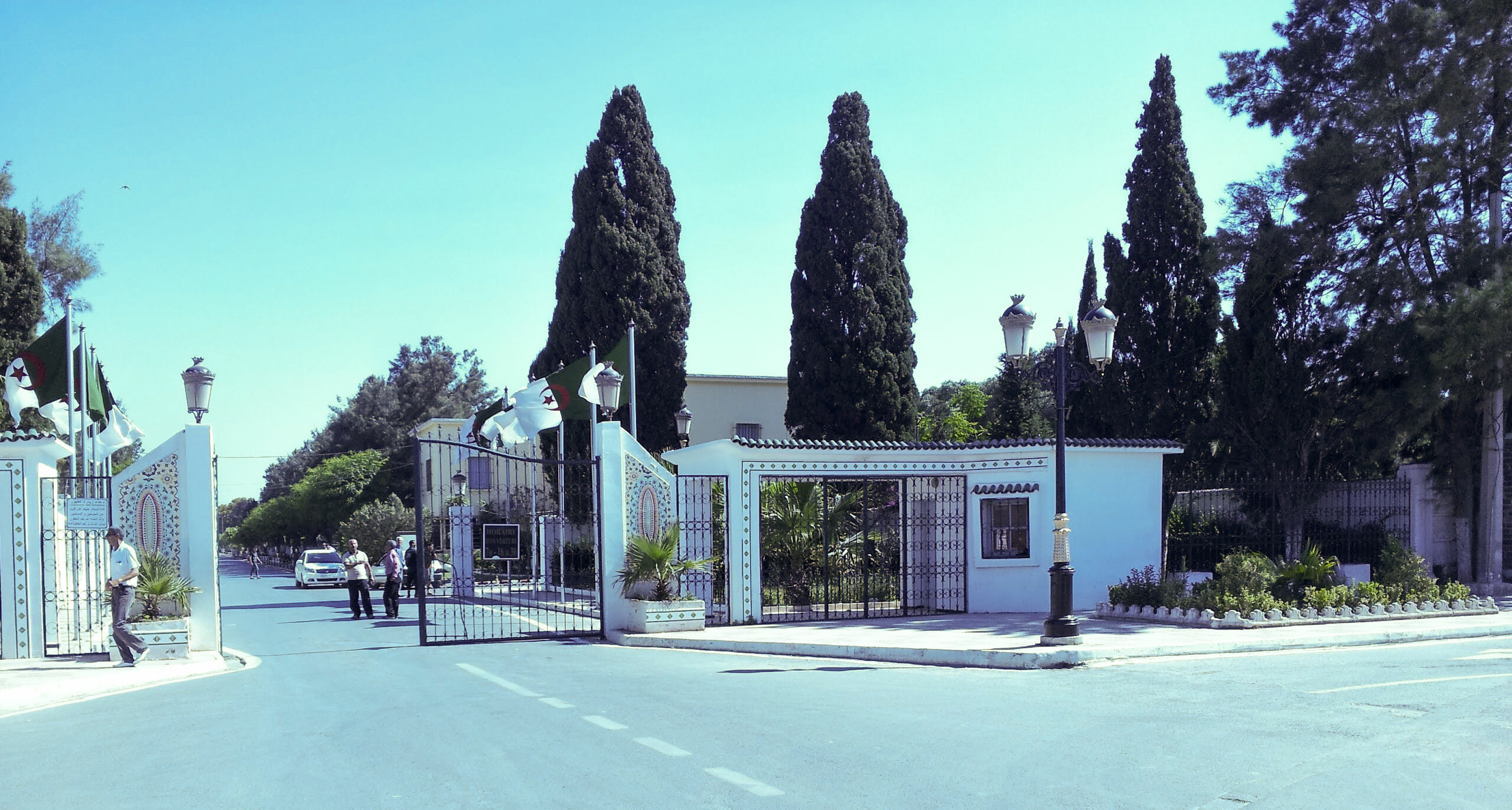
- Interactive map of El Alia Cemetery

Details
- Established: 1928; 98 years ago
- Location: Oued Smar, Algiers
- Country: Algeria
- Coordinates: 36°43′11″N 3°09′53″E
- Size: 78 hectares (190 acres)

El Alia Cemetery (Arabic: مقبرة العالية, romanized: Maqbarat al-ʻĀlīyah) is a cemetery in the commune of Oued Smar, a suburb of Algiers, Algeria. It was established in 1928, following the donation of a 78 hectares (190 acres) plot of land by its owner Hamza El-Alia before his departure to Mecca.

== Notable interments ==
The cemetery comprises tombs of numerous Algerian notables and also has the graves of actors and actresses and other artists (opera singers, musicians, painters, sculptors, architects, writers, poets). It also includes the tombs of several scientists, academicians and sports people.

Allied soldiers who died during the North African Campaign were also buried there, including men who were evacuated to Africa after being wounded during Operation Husky, and who died there. Commonwealth graves are maintained by the Commonwealth War Graves Commission.

=== List ===
- Emir Abdelkader, military, political and religious leader, freedom fighter, writer, human rights advocate (body controversially reinterned from 1883 burial grounds in Damascus near his mentor Ibn Arabi's body in 1965 to El Alia Cemetery). (d. 1883)
- Ahmed Mahsas, militant and politician (d. 2013)
- Kateb Yacine, writer (d. 1989)
- Colonel Amirouche, revolutionary fighter (d. 1959)
- Lalla Fatma N'Soumer, important figure of the Algerian resistance movement (d. 1863)
- Krim Belkacem, revolutionary fighter and politician (d. 1970)
- Ferhat Abbas, pharmacist, writer and political leader (d. 1985)
- Warda Al-Jazairia, singer (d. 2012)
- Keltoum, Algerian actress (d. 2010)
- Larbi Ben M'hidi, revolutionary leader (d. 1957)
- Mohamed Benameur, football player (d. 2010)
- Ali Kafi, politician (d. 2013)
- Smain Lamari, head of an Algerian intelligence service, the Department of Counter-Espionage and Internal Security (d. 2007)
- M'hamed Benguettaf, actor and playwright (d. 2014)
- Abderrezak Bouhara, politician (d. 2013)
- Ahmed Ben Bella, socialist soldier, revolutionary and first President of Algeria (d. 2012)
- Chadli Bendjedid, politician and third President of Algeria (d. 2012)
- Houari Boumedienne colonel, military and politician, and second President of Algeria (d. 1978)
- Djelloul Khatib, revolutionary fighter and public servant (d. 2017)
- Mahfoud Nahnah, politician (d. 2003)
- Mostefa Belloucif, military (d. 2010)
- Ali Tounsi, Chief of the Algerian National Police (d. 2010)
- Abdelmadjid Aouchiche, founder of DNC/ANP and former minister of housing (d. 2010)
- Mohamed Hardi, politician (d. 1996)
- Bachir Boumaza, politician (d. 2009)
- Cherif Guellal, businessman and diplomat (d. 2009)
- Lakehal Ayat, military general and politician (d. 2006)
- Chérif Belkacem, politician (d. 2009)
- Gaston Désiré Chatelain, military adjudant-chef buried in 1958 he was exhumed in 1959 and buried in Thugny-Trugny, France.
- Abdelaziz Bouteflika, politician and seventh President of Algeria. (d. 2021)
- Abdelkader Bensalah, politician, President of the Council of the Nation and acting Head of State of Algeria. (d. 2021)

== See also ==
- Cemeteries of Algiers
