= Ibrahim Boughali =

Algerian politician and Assembly President of Algeria

- ابراهيم بوغالي
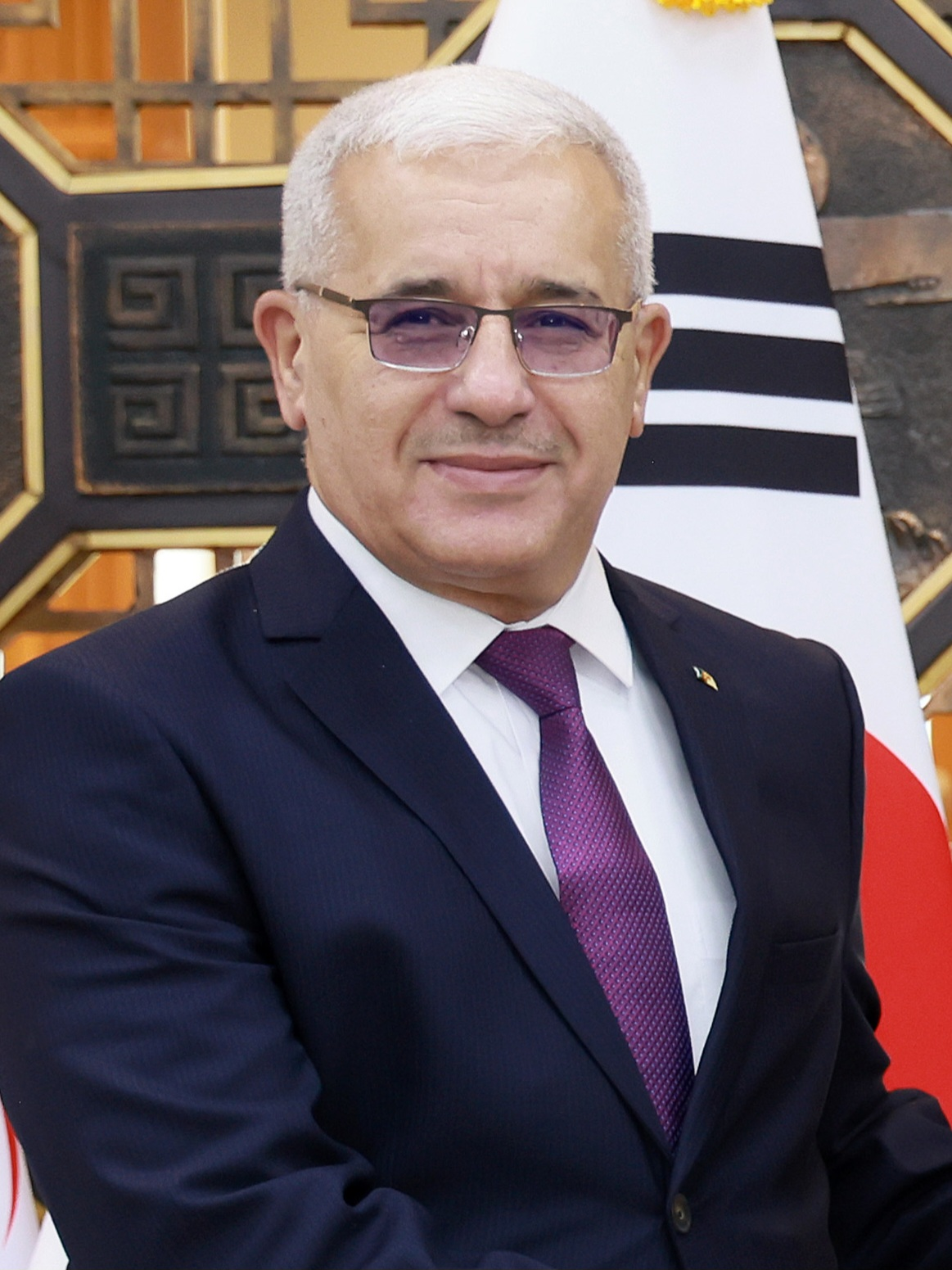
- Boughali in 2024

President of the People's National Assembly
- In office 8 July 2021 – 28 July 2026
- Preceded by: Slimane Chenine
- Succeeded by: Khalida Boufedeche

Algerian Deputy
- In office 12 June 2021 – 2 July 2026
- Constituency: Ghardaia

Personal details
- Born: 3 March 1963 (age 63) Beni Isguene, Algeria
- Party: Independent

Ibrahim Boughali (Arabic: ابراهيم بوغالي; born 3 March 1963) is an Algerian politician who is currently serving as the assembly president of Algeria. On 8 July 2021 he became the president of the country's People's National Assembly, a position he held until 28 July 2026.

== Career and achievements ==
He holds a degree in political science and international relations from the University of Algiers, and got promotion 1986. He has held several positions:

- Head of agency at CNEP and researcher at the Al Baraka bank.
- Chairman of the agriculture commission at the People's Assembly of the wilaya (APW) of Ghardaïa (2017/2020).
- President of the APW of Ghardaïa.

He is considered to be one of the architects of reconciliation during the events of Ghardaïa.

He was elected on July 8, 2021 as the President of the National People's Congress for five years.

== Personal life ==
Ibrahim Boughali is married and is the father of four children.
