= Mouad Bouchareb =

Algerian politician

- معاذ بوشارب

President of the People's National Assembly
- In office 24 October 2018 – 2 July 2019
- Preceded by: Saïd Bouhadja
- Succeeded by: Slimane Chenine

Mouad Bouchareb is an Algerian politician. He served as president of the lower house of Algeria's parliament, the People's National Assembly, from 24 October 2018 to 2 July 2019. He resigned after protesters demanded his removal.

Slimane Chenine was appointed as his successor.
