= Mohamed Benameur =

Algerian footballer (1959-2010)

Personal information
- Full name: Mohamed Benameur
- Date of birth: 4 December 1959
- Place of birth: Algeria
- Date of death: 30 December 2010 (aged 51)
- Place of death: Algiers, Algeria
- Position: Midfielder

Youth career
- –1976: USM El Harrach

Senior career*
Years	Team	Apps	(Gls)
1976–1981	USM El Harrach	-	(-)
1981–1982	WA Boufarik	-	(-)
1981	USM Alger	-	(-)
	RC Relizane	-	(-)
	Hydra AC	-	(-)

International career
1978–1979	Algeria U20		
- * Club domestic league appearances and goals

Mohamed Benameur (4 December 1959 – 30 December 2010) was an Algerian football player. He represented Algeria at the 1979 FIFA World Youth Championship.

== Personal ==
Benameur was born on 4 December 1959. His first name is listed by various sources as Mohamed, Mustapha and Rachid.

== Club career ==
Benameur began his career in the junior ranks of USM El Harrach. In November 1976, he made his senior debut in a league game against MC Oran.

In 1981, Benameur left USM El Harrach and joined WA Boufarik. He only remained at the club for one season before leaving to USM Alger, where he stayed just a few months. He then went on to play for RC Relizane, Hydra AC and a brief stint in Syria before ending his career before his 25th birthday.

== International career ==
In November 1977, aged just 17 years old, Benameur was called up to the Algerian National Team by Rachid Mekhloufi for a 1978 African Cup of Nations qualifier against Zambia. However, he did not participate in the game as Algeria lost 2–0.

In 1978, Benameur was a member of the Algerian Under-20 team that won the 1979 African Youth Championship. A year later, he was a member of the Algerian Under-20 team at the 1979 FIFA World Youth Championship. He started all 4 of Algeria's games at the tournament before Algeria lost against Argentina in the second round.

== Death ==
On 30 December 2010, Benameur died at the L'hopital Parnet in Algiers. He was buried in the El Alia Cemetery the following day.

== Honours ==
- Won the 1979 African Youth Championship
