= Death and state funeral of Houari Boumédiène =

- Date: 27 December 1978 (death); 29 December 1978 (funeral); 27 December 1978 – 5 February 1979 (mourning period)
- Venue: Palace of the People; Djamaa el Kebir
- Location: Algiers, Algeria
- Burial: El Alia Cemetery

On 27 December 1978, the Algerian president Houari Boumédiène died in office. He had previously served as Chairman of the Revolutionary Council (1965–1976) and subsequently as President of the Republic (1976–1978). During the final forty days of his life, he was critically ill. The announcement of his death was formally broadcast by the national radio at 08:00.

The Algerian government, which had pledged to continue the 13-year "socialist revolution", declared a period of 40 days of official mourning. Rabah Bitat, President of the People's National Assembly, was to serve as interim president for a period of up to 45 days.

Boumédiène's illness reportedly began suddenly following the conclusion of the Steadfastness and Confrontation Front Summit, held in Damascus. No official statement concerning his condition was issued at that time. He was treated discreetly in the Soviet Union in early October before returning to Algeria on 14 October. Late in the evening of 17 October, he suffered a cerebral stroke and entered a deep coma. This development marked the first instance in which Algerian television publicly alluded to the president's illness.

U.S. President Jimmy Carter issued a statement on the death of Houari Boumédiène. The Cuban government announced a three-day period of mourning.

== Funeral ==
=== Dignitaries ===
- Austria: Foreign Minister Willibald Pahr
- Bahrain: A delegation headed by Sheikh Mohamad bin Khalifa Al Khalifa, Minister of the Interior and Acting Minister of Foreign Affairs.
- China: A delegation led by Vice Premier Geng Biao.
- Cuba: A Party and government delegation headed by Vice President Juan Almeida and Politburo member Armando Hart.
- Cyprus: President Spyros Kyprianou
- France: Foreign Minister Jean François-Poncet
- West Germany: Foreign Minister Hans-Dietrich Genscher
- Guinea-Bissau: President Luís Cabral
- North Korea: Pak Song-chol, special envoy of President Kim Il-sung.
- Lebanon: Prime Minister Salim Al-Huss
- Libya: Secretary General of the GPC Muammar Gaddafi
- Pakistan: President Zia-ul-Haq
- Palestine: Leader of the Palestine Liberation Organization, Yasser Arafat, and the second-in-command in the leadership of Fatah, Salah Khalaf.
- Soviet Union: Vice President Vasily Kuznetsov
- Spain: Foreign Minister Marcelino Oreja, 1st Marquess of Oreja
- Sudan: President Jaafar Nimeiry
- Syria: President Hafez al-Assad
- United Kingdom: Foreign Secretary David Owen
- United States: A U.S. delegation led by Treasury Secretary W. Michael Blumenthal.
