= Hadj Mohamed Benalla =

Algerian politician

President of the National Assembly
- In office October 7, 1964 – June 19, 1965
- Preceded by: Position established
- Succeeded by: Rabah Bitat (Note: Indirectly, through the succeeding People's National Assembly)

President of the National Constituent Assembly
- Preceded by: Ferhat Abbas
- Succeeded by: Position disestablished

Personal details
- Born: Ouadane, Oran Province, French Algeria (now Algeria)
- Died: May 2, 2009 Ain Naadja Military Hospital, Algiers, Algeria
- Resting place: El Alia Cemetery, El Alia, Algeria

Military service
- Allegiance: France (1944-1950); Algeria (1950-1965)

Hadj Mohamed Benalla was an Algerian politician who served as the second President of the National Constituent Assembly and the first and only President of the National Assembly, the ANC's successor.

== Biography ==
Benalla was born on February 24, 1923, in Ouadane, Oran Province, Algeria, into a very modest family. He completed his primary studies in Tiaret. He began working at 14, first in a pastry factory, then as a courier, then a mechanic, and finally as a clerk. During World War II, he joined the French Army as a non-commissioned officer after Operation Torch. Benalla joined the Algerian People's Party (PPA) in 1937 and then the Special Organisation (OS) in 1948. He took part in an unsuccessful raid to free OS leader Ouali Bennai in Djurdjura. When the OS was dissolved in 1950, Benalla was imprisoned for three years.

On March 23, 1954, Benalla joined the Revolutionary Committee of Unity and Action (CRUA), and helped the organization obtain weapons. In November 1954, he began fighting alongside the FLN in Wilaya V led by Larbi Ben M'hidi. In 1955, Benalla became M'hidi's deputy. He took up the nom de guerre Si Bouzid. Benalla was arrested on November 16, 1956, and imprisoned in France. He was tried by a military court in Oran, and sentenced to death. In 1957, his sentence was commuted to life imprisonment, then a partial pardon in 1958, and finally released in 1960.

In 1961, Benalla was promoted to commander, and 1962 he sat on the National Council of the Algerian Revolution. He led the political bureau of the FLN from May 9, 1963.

Benalla first served as vice-president of the National Constituent Assembly, the first iteration of the lower chamber of elected representatives of Algeria. After the resignation of Ferhat Abbas on August 16, 1963, Benalla was appointed Interim President of the assembly until his election on October 7. After the legislative elections of 1964, Benalla was elected president of the National Assembly, the successor organization to the National Constituent Assembly. Benalla opposed the 1965 Algerian coup d'état, and was imprisoned and tortured by the Military Security. Benalla was placed under house arrest in Biskra until 1978.

Benalla died on May 2, 2009, at the Ain Naadja Military Hospital from respiratory problems. He is buried in the El Alia Cemetery.
