= Khalida Boufedeche =

President of the People's National Assembly of Algeria

- خليدة بوفدش
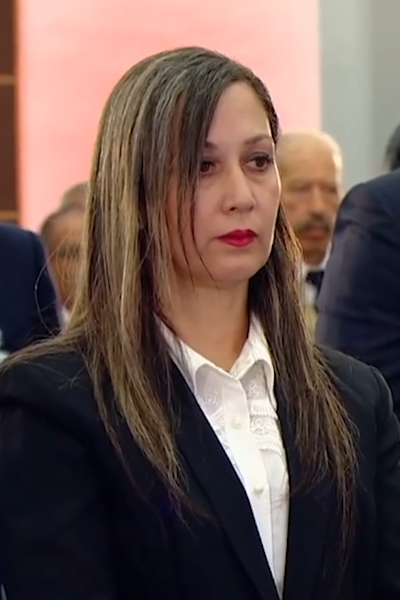
- Boufedeche in August 2026

President of the People's National Assembly
- Incumbent
- Assumed office 28 July 2026
- 10th Legislature
- Preceded by: Ibrahim Boughali

Member of the People's National Assembly
- Incumbent
- Assumed office 2 July 2026
- 10th Legislature
- Parliamentary group: FLN
- Constituency: Algiers

Personal details
- Born: 27 May 1982 (age 44)
- Party: FLN
- Occupation: Physician

Khalida Boufedeche (Arabic: خليدة بوفدش; born 27 May 1982) is an Algerian physician and politician and a member of the People's National Assembly of Algeria. On 28 July 2026, she was elected the first woman president of the country's People's National Assembly.

== Career ==
Boufedeche began her professional career as a physician after obtaining her degree in general medicine from the University of Algiers. She later specialized in allergology and clinical immunology and worked as a specialist physician at the Béni Messous University Hospital. She also served as head of department at the Directorate of Health and Population of Algiers Province.

Before entering national politics, she was a member of the People's Municipal Assembly of Bordj El Bahri from 2012 to 2017, and later served as a member of the People's Provincial Assembly of Algiers for the 2021–2026 term.

Boufedeche was elected as a member of the People's National Assembly representing Algiers Province in the 2026 Algerian parliamentary election. She is a member of the National Liberation Front (FLN) and serves on the party's Central Committee.

On 28 July 2026, she was elected president of the People's National Assembly, becoming the first woman to hold this position in Algeria.

== Personal life ==
Khalida Boufedeche is married and is the mother of two children.
