= M'hamed Benguettaf =

Algerian actor and playwright

- Born: c. 1938; Algiers, Algeria
- Died: 5 January 2014 (aged 75); Algiers, Algeria
- Burial place: El Alia Cemetery
- Occupation(s): Actor, playwright

M'hamed Benguettaf (c. 1938 – 5 January 2014) was an Algerian actor and playwright.

== Death ==
M'hamed Benguettaf died following a long illness on 5 January 2014, aged 75, in his hometown of Algiers. He was buried in El Alia Cemetery.
