= Abdelkader Bengrina =

Algerian politician

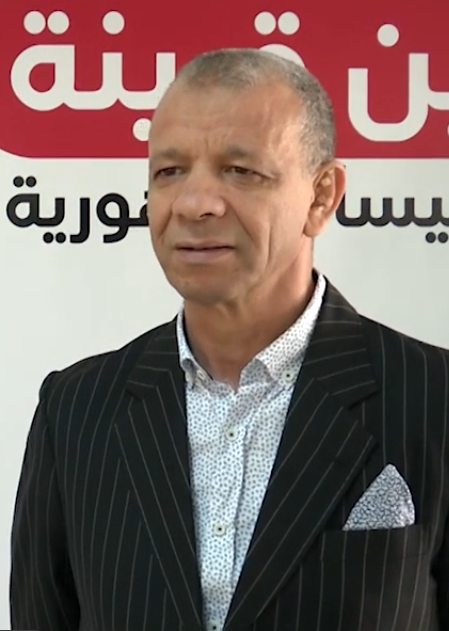
Abdelkader Bengrina

Abdelkader Bengrina (Arabic: عبد القادر بن قرينة; born 1 January 1962) is an Algerian politician from the National Construction Movement who was the party's candidate in the December 2019 Algerian presidential election.

== Positions held ==
- 2002–2007: Member of the Wilaya of Algiers
- 1997–1999: Minister of Tourism and Handicrafts
- 1994–1997: Member of the National Transitional Council
