= Abdelkader Bensalah =

Algerian politician (1941–2021)

- عبد القـادر بن صالح
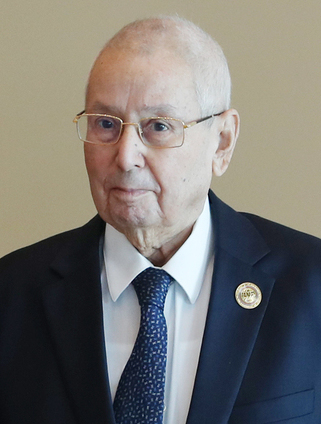
- Bensalah in 2019

Head of State of Algeria
- Acting; 9 April 2019 – 19 December 2019
- Prime Minister: Noureddine Bedoui
- Preceded by: Abdelaziz Bouteflika (President)
- Succeeded by: Abdelmadjid Tebboune (President)

President of the Council of the Nation
- In office 2 July 2002 – 9 April 2019
- Preceded by: Bachir Boumaza
- Succeeded by: Salah Goudjil

President of the People's National Assembly
- In office 14 June 1997 – 10 June 2002
- Preceded by: Himself (President of the National Transitional Council)
- Succeeded by: Karim Younes

Personal details
- Born: 24 November 1941 Fellaoucene, French Algeria
- Died: 22 September 2021 (aged 79) Algiers, Algeria
- Party: National Liberation Front (1959–1997); Democratic National Rally (1997–2019)

Abdelkader Bensalah (Arabic: عبد القـادر بن صالح, romanized: ʿAbd āl-Qādar bin Ṣāliḥ, 24 November 1941 – 22 September 2021) was an Algerian politician.

He served as the President of the Council of the Nation, the upper house of the bicameral Parliament of Algeria, between 2002 and 2019.

After President Abdelaziz Bouteflika, who had ruled the country for 20 years, resigned in April 2019, Bensalah served as the Acting Head of State of Algeria until Abdelmadjid Tebboune took office after winning the presidential election in December 2019.

== Political career ==
After working in Beirut to direct the Algerian Center for Information and Culture from 1970 to 1974, Bensalah returned to Algeria to work as a journalist at the state newspaper El Chaâb for three years, before being elected to represent the Tlemcen Province in 1977. Twelve years later, he was appointed Ambassador to Saudi Arabia, a position he held until 1993.

As a member of the centrist Democratic National Rally (RND), he was President of the National Transitional Council from 1994 to 1997 and of the People's National Assembly from 1997 to 2002.

From July 2002 to April 2019, he served as President of the Council of the Nation, the upper house of the parliament. He replaced Abdelaziz Bouteflika for some presidential duties, like welcoming foreign leaders to Algeria, during the last part of the former President's tenure. He was a strong ally of the latter, supporting his fifth candidacy even during the 2019 Algerian protests.

As provided for under article 102 of the Algerian Constitution, he became acting Head of State of Algeria on 9 April 2019, seven days after the resignation of Abdelaziz Bouteflika. His term lasted for a maximum of 90 days while the presidential election should have been held. By law, he was barred from participating in that election. On 19 December 2019, he received the National Order of Merit from President Abdelmadjid Tebboune.

== Personal life and death ==
Abdelkader Bensalah was born on 24 November 1941, in Felaoussene, close to Tlemcen, then part of French Algeria.

Bensalah died from cancer at the Aïn Nadja Military Hospital in Algiers on 22 September 2021, aged 79, with his health worsening after contracting COVID-19. His death, which occurred just five days after the death of Abdelaziz Bouteflika, was announced by the Office of the President. Flags were ordered to fly at half-mast for three days in mourning. He was buried at the El Alia Cemetery on 23 September.

== Honours ==
=== National honour ===
- - the National Order of Merit with rank of Sadr

Political offices
Preceded by Abdelaziz Bouteflika	Head of State of Algeria; Acting; 2019	Succeeded by Abdelmadjid Tebboune
Preceded by Bachir Boumaza	President of the Council of the Nation; 2002–2019	Succeeded by Salah Goudjil
