= Azouz Nasri =

Algerian politician (born 1945)

- عزوز ناصري
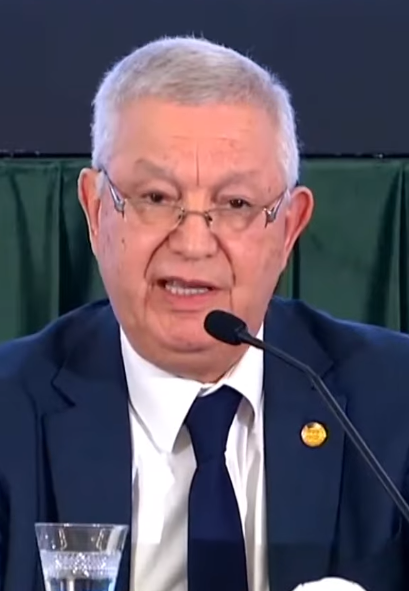
- Nasri in March 2026

President of the Council of the Nation
- Incumbent
- Assumed office 19 May 2025
- Preceded by: Salah Goudjil

Personal details
- Born: 1945 (age 80–81) Sétif, Algeria
- Education: University of Algiers 1, National School of Administration

Azouz Nasri (Arabic: عزوز ناصري; born 1945) is an Algerian politician, former Member of Parliament for the National Liberation Front (2002–2007) and current member of the Council of the Nation, appointed as part of the presidential third parliamentary group (2022–2028). He was elected President of the Council of the Nation on 19 May 2025, succeeding Salah Goudjil.

Political offices
Preceded by Salah Goudjil	President of the Council of the Nation; 2025–present	Incumbent
