= Saïd Bouhadja =

Algerian politician (1938–2020)

- سعـيد بـوحجــة

President of the People's National Assembly
- In office 23 May 2017 – 24 October 2018
- Preceded by: Mohamed Larbi Ould Khelifa
- Succeeded by: Mouad Bouchareb

Member of the People's National Assembly for Skikda Province
- In office 4 May 2017 – 25 November 2020

Personal details
- Born: 22 April 1938 Skikda, French Algeria
- Died: 25 November 2020 (aged 82) Algiers, Algeria
- Party: FLN

Saïd Bouhadja (22 April 1938 – 25 November 2020) was an Algerian politician.

== Career ==
He was a member of the National Liberation Front and was elected as President of the People's National Assembly, serving from 23 May 2017 to 24 October 2018. He was succeeded by Mouad Bouchareb.

During the 2019–20 Algerian protests, Bouhadja withdrew his name from consideration for the 2019 Algerian presidential election.
