= Salah Goudjil =

Algerian politician (born 1931)

- صالح قوجيل
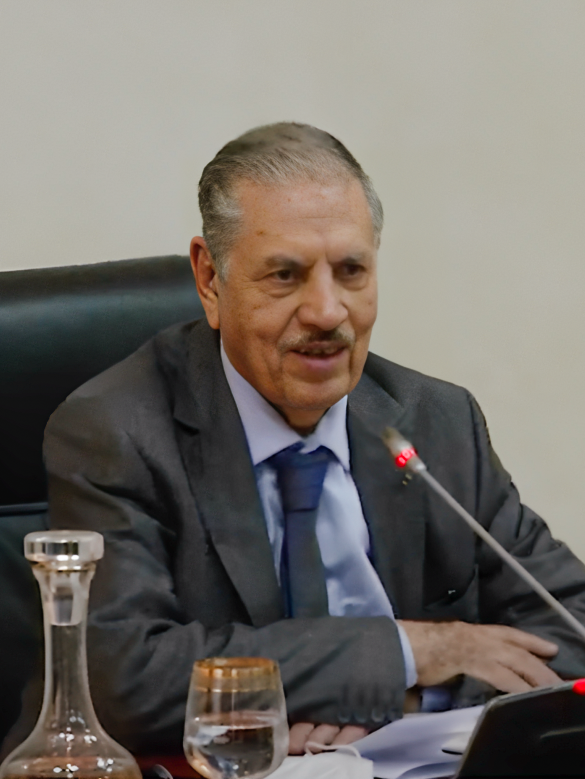
- Goudjil in 2021

President of the Council of the Nation
- In office 9 April 2019 – 19 May 2025
- Preceded by: Abdelkader Bensalah
- Succeeded by: Azouz Nasri

Personal details
- Born: 14 January 1931 (age 94) Batna, Algeria

Salah Goudjil (Arabic: صالح قوجيل; born 14 January 1931) is an Algerian politician, belonging to the Secretariat of the Executive Committee of the National Liberation Front (FLN). He took part in the Algerian War of Independence against France. Goudjil has served as Minister of Transport and Fishing in various FLN cabinets.

Political offices
| Preceded by Abdelkader Bensalah | President of the Council of the Nation; 2019–2025 | Succeeded by Azouz Nasri |
