= 2019 Algerian presidential election =

Election of Abdelmadjid Tebboune

- 12 December 2019
- Registered: 24,464,161
- Turnout: 39.88%
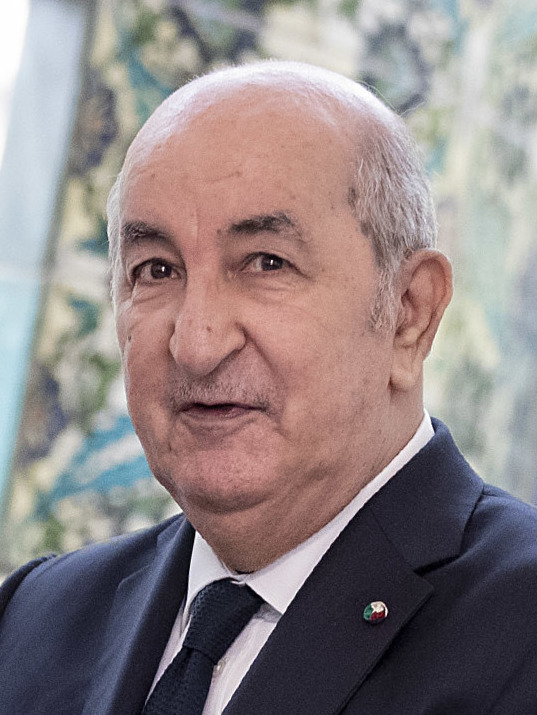

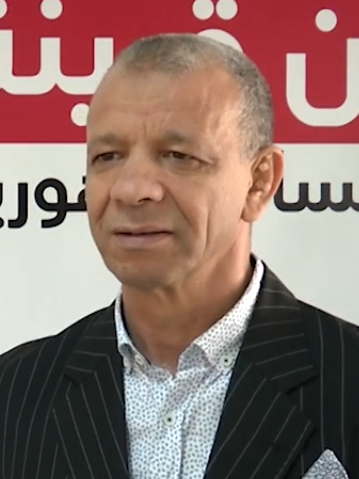

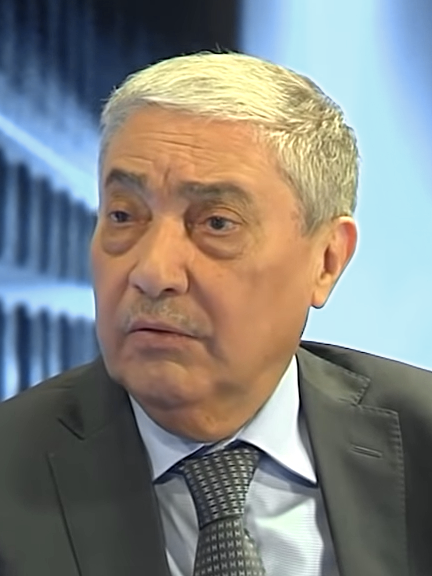

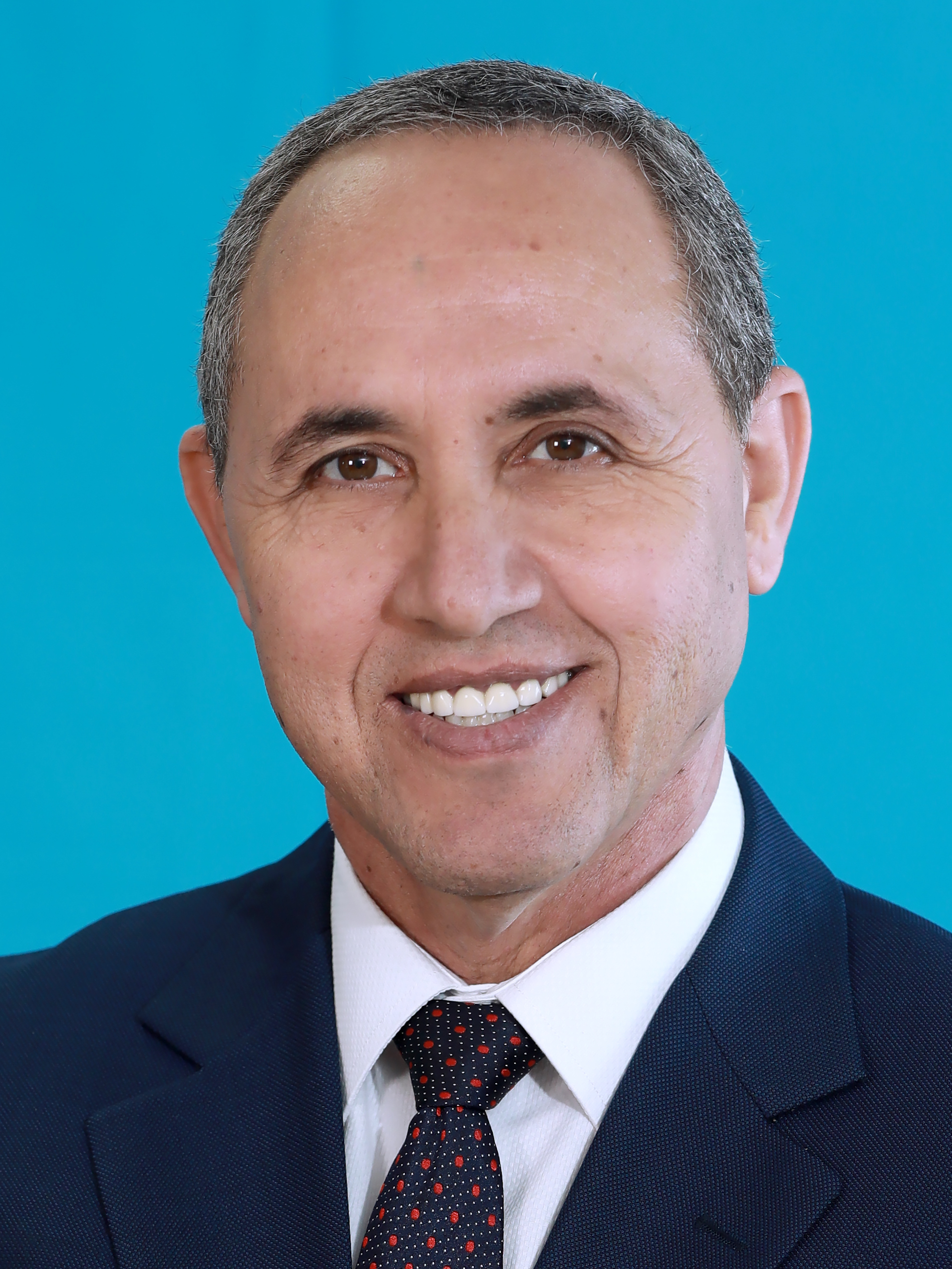

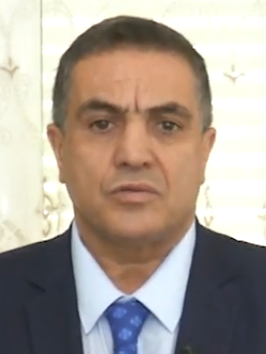
Nominee	Abdelmadjid Tebboune	Abdelkader Bengrina	Ali Benflis
Party	Independent (FLN)	El Binaa	AGL
Popular vote	4,947,523	1,477,836	897,831
Percentage	58.13%	17.37%	10.55%
Nominee	Azzedine Mihoubi	Abdelaziz Belaïd
Party	RND	FM
Popular vote	619,225	568,000
Percentage	7.28%	6.67%
- Results by province
President before election
Abdelkader Bensalah (acting)
Independent
Elected President
Abdelmadjid Tebboune
Independent

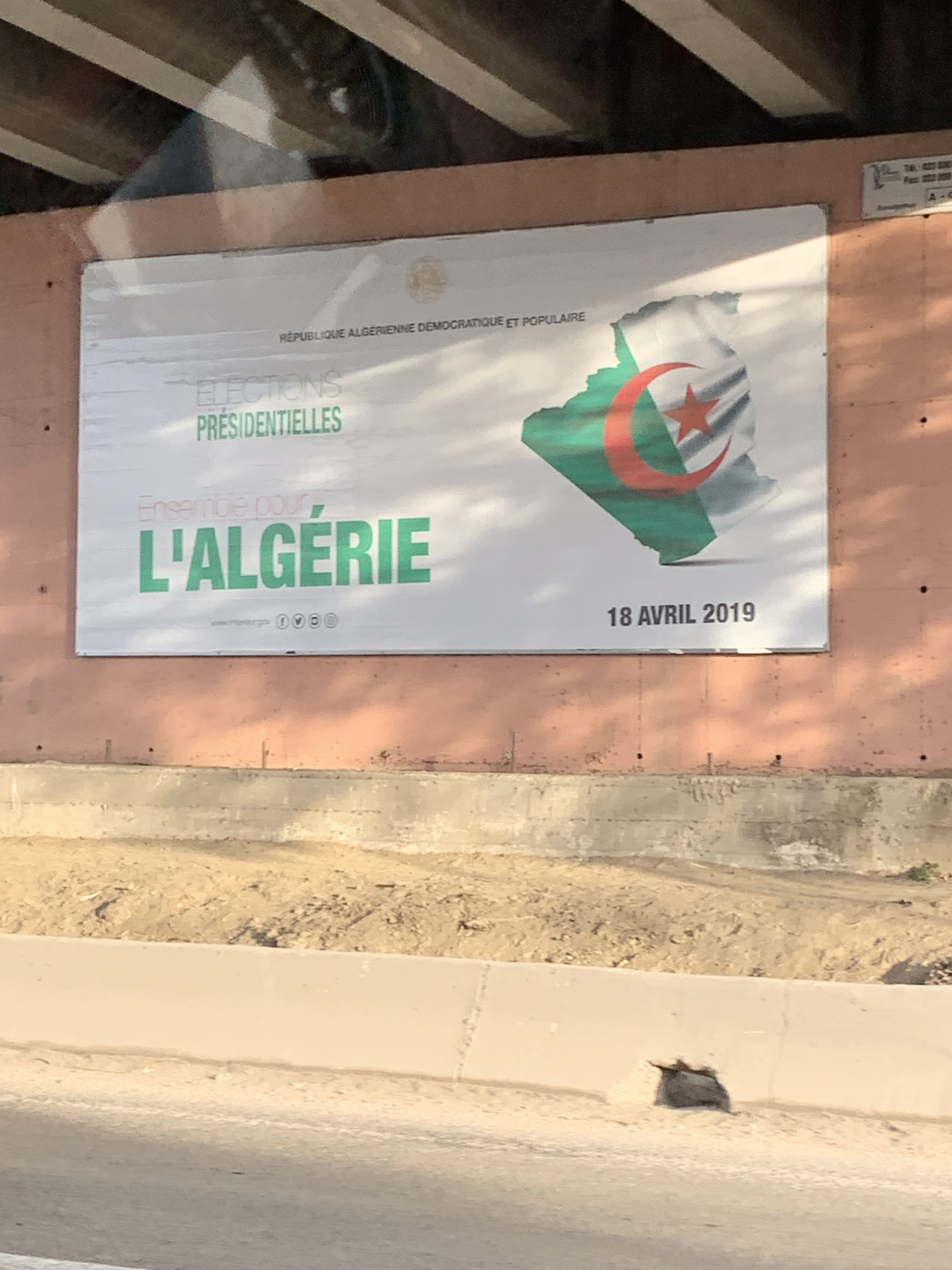
Poster announcing the presidential election before it was postponed

Presidential elections were held in Algeria on 12 December 2019. The election had originally been scheduled for 18 April, but was postponed due to sustained weekly protests against plans by the incumbent president Abdelaziz Bouteflika to run for a fifth term. Bouteflika resigned on 2 April and Abdelkader Bensalah was elected acting president by parliament a week later. On 10 April the election was rescheduled for 4 July. On 2 June the Constitutional Council postponed the elections again, citing a lack of candidates. A new electoral authority, Autorité nationale indépendante des élections (ANIE), was created in mid-September as an alternative to the existing Haute instance indépendante de surveillance des élections (HIISE) defined by the 2016 constitution. The election was rescheduled for 12 December 2019 and ANIE, of disputed constitutional validity, announced five valid candidates on 2 November. In their 200000 strong protest on 1 November, Algerian protestors rejected the 12 December election and called for a radical change in the system to take place first. The Forces of the Democratic Alternative (FDA) alliance and the Justice and Development Front also called for boycotting the 12 December election, and the FDA called for creating a constituent assembly.

== Electoral system ==
The President of Algeria is elected using the two-round system; if no candidate receives a majority of the vote in the first round, a second round will be held.

=== Electoral bodies ===
The Algerian Constitution of 2016 created the Haute instance indépendante de surveillance des élections (HIISE) to have overall responsibility for organising elections. For the third attempt to organise the 2019 presidential election, the Algerian lower and upper houses of parliament created the Independent National Elections Authority (ANIE). Lawyer Faïz Moussi and constitutional expert Ahmed Betatache described the procedures for creating ANIE as rushed and unconstitutional. Fouad Makhlouf, secretary-general of HIISE, had stated earlier, in April 2019, that the replacement of HIISE's role by an alternative electoral body would be unconstitutional.

== Background ==
=== Early 2019 protests and internet censorship ===
Plans for a presidential election in Algeria in 2019 were a major factor motivating the start of the 2019 Algerian protests, with protestors objecting to the reelection of Abdelaziz Bouteflika.

On 22 February 2019, protests took place in Algiers, Oran, Sétif, Annaba and other Algerian cities over Bouteflika's bid to continue for a fifth term. Algerians reported difficulty accessing online services and the NetBlocks internet observatory published technical evidence of multiple targeted internet disruptions at demonstration flashpoints in Tizi Ouzou and around Algiers.

== Candidates ==
Bensalah is not eligible to participate in the presidential election.

=== 18 April 2019 cancelled election ===
On 3 March 2019, a day after his 82nd birthday and while undergoing medical tests in Switzerland, President Abdelaziz Bouteflika formally submitted his candidacy, but said in a statement read on state TV that he would not serve a full term if re-elected. Instead, he promised to organise a national conference and set a date for an early election which he would not participate in. The announcement followed weeks of protests against his plan to seek a fifth term in office. A week later, on 11 March 2019, Bouteflika withdrew from the race and postponed the election.

On 1 November 2018, journalist Ghani Mahdi announced that he would be a candidate in the election.

On 4 April 2019, Ali Ghediri, a former director of human resources at the Ministry of Defense, announced his candidacy.

=== 4 July 2019 cancelled election ===
The 4 July 2019 election had two candidates who applied: Abdelhakim Hamadi from Jijel, born 23 August 1965, who trained as a vet, worked in the state sector and became a businessman; and Hamid Touahri, an aeronautical mechanical engineer who worked in medical sales and construction and managed an audiovisual production firm. Both candidates' applications were lodged on 25 May, and later rejected by the Constitutional Council, which cancelled the election due to what it called the "impossibility" of organising the election.

=== 12 December 2019 election ===
Potential candidates Ahmed Gaid Salah and Noureddine Bedoui won't run. Former prime minister Abdelaziz Belkhadem was expected to be a candidate. The Tajamou Amel El-Djazaïr former minister Amar Ghoul (in prison at the time) announced his participation in the vote.

145 people picked up their application forms, including:

- Ali Benflis, former head of government;
- Abdelaziz Belaid, president of the El Moustakbal Front;
- Aissa Belhadi, president of the Front of Good Governance;
- Abdelkader Bengrina, president of the El-Bina Movement;
- Ali Zeghdoud, president of the Algerian Rally party;
- Mourad Arroudj, president of Errafah;
- Belkacem Sahli, president of the Republican National Alliance;
- Abdelmadjid Tebboune, former Prime Minister;
- Rabah Bencherif;
- Azzedine Mihoubi, former Minister of Culture;
- Rabah Bencherif;
- Souleymen Bakhlili, journalist;
- Ahmed Ben Nâamane, writer;
- Abderrahmane Arrar, coordinator of the Civil Force for Change.

==== Candidates submitting nominations ====
This list includes all the candidates who have deposited their candidacy file with the Independent National Elections Authority:

List of potential candidates for the December elections
Number	Condidate	Career	Nominee of
1	Noui Kharchi	University Professor	Independent (supported by National Liberation Front)
2	Belkacem Sahli	Party leader	National Republican Alliance
3	Raouf Ayeb	Pharmacist	Independent
4	Souleymane Bakhlili	Journalist	Independent
5	Abbas Djamel	University Professor	Independent
6	Abdelhakim Hamadi		Independent
7	Abderrahman Arare	Association leader	Independent
8	Abderrezak Hbirate		Independent
9	Abdelaziz Belaïd	Party leader	Future Front
10	Abdelkader Bengrina	Party leader	National Construction Movement
11	Abdelmadjid Tebboune	Former First Minister	Independent
12	Abelmonaim Najia	Lawyer	Independent
13	Azzedine Mihoubi	Party leader	Democratic National Rally
14	Ali Benflis	Former First Minister	Vanguards Liberties Party
15	Ali Zeghdoude	Party leader	Algerian Rally
16	Ali Skouri		Independent
17	Aissa Belhadi	Party leader	El Hokm Errachid
18	Fares Mesdour	University Professor	Independent
19	Labbas Ayadi		Independent
20	Mohammed BouAouina		Independent
21	Mohammed Dhif		Independent
22	Mourad Arouj	Party leader	

==== Final candidates ====
The list below is the final list of candidates for the presidentials of 12 December 2019, after the Constitutional Council rejected all the appeals submitted for failure to establish and not to fulfill the essential requirements contained in Articles 139 and 142 of the Organic Law related to the electoral system, amended and supplemented. The candidates whose appeals were rejected (09) are: Belkacem Sahili, Ali Skouri, Abdel Hakim Hammadi, Noui Kharchi, Muhammad Dhaif, Abdelhakim Hamadi, Mohammed BouAouina, Fares Mesdour, Raouf Ayeb.

List of candidates for the elections
Photo	Condidate	Career	Nominee of	Submitted forms	Accepted forms
	Abdelkader Bengrina	Party leader	National Construction Movement	93,151	83,342
	Abdelaziz Belaïd	Party leader	Future Front	85,166	77,239
	Azzedine Mihoubi	Party leader	Democratic National Rally	70,599	65,743
	Ali Benflis	Party leader	Vanguard of Freedoms	89,472	81,295
	Abdelmadjid Tebboune	Former First Minister	Independent (supported by National Liberation Front)	124,125	104,826

Al Jazeera English described the five candidates as "all part of the political establishment", whose departure from power is one of the main aims of the 2019 Algerian protests. Thomson Reuters described the candidates as "men on the ballot [who] all have close links with the establishment, and though some of them pushed for reforms, many still see them as part of an entrenched, unchanging elite."

== Election schedule ==
The timetable for the presidential elections, and the following is an illustrative schedule for the dates and procedures for the presidential elections, 12 December 2019:

12 December 2019 presidential election calendar
Number	Legal action	Date
1	Date of calling the electoral commission to elect the President of the Republic	15 September 2019
2	Extraordinary review of the electoral lists	22 September 2019 – 6 October 2019
3	Submit objections to registration or cancellation	7 October 2019 – 12 October 2019
4	Periodic review of the electoral lists	12 October 2019 – 17 October 2019
5	Deposit the candidacy declaration	17 October 2019 – 26 October 2019
6	Set up voting agencies	1 October 2019 – 8 December 2019
7	Publish the list of voting office members and additional members	27 October 2019 – 10 November 2019
8	Delivering the list of voting office members and additional members to the legally qualified representatives of the candidates at their request	27 October 2019 – 10 November 2019
9	The start and end date of the election campaign	17 November 2019 – 8 December 2019
10	Preventing the publication, broadcasting and probing of opinions, exploring the intentions of voters in voting, and measuring the popularity of candidates at the national level	9 December 2019 – 12 December 2019
11	Preventing the publication, broadcasting and probing of opinions and exploring the voters ’intentions to vote and measuring the popularity of the candidates in relation to the community residing abroad	7 December 2019 – 12 December 2019
12	Election date and time	12 December 2019 from 08h00 to 19h00
13	To object to the validity of the voting operations	12 December 2019 (Election day)
14	The announcement of the final results of the presidential elections by the Constitutional Council	16 December 2019 – 25 December 2019
Second round case
15	The start and end date of the election campaign for the second round	Begins twelve days before and ends two days before the polling date
16	The date of the second round of the Election	31 December 2019 – 9 January 2020

== Boycott ==
=== Protestors ===
In the weekly protests that continued the early 2019 protests that led to Bouteflika dropping his candidacy for the initially scheduled election and resigning from the presidency, twenty thousand protestors called for the 12 December election to be boycotted on the grounds that the system of people in power under Bouteflika remained in place. In the 1 November 2019 demonstration of two hundred thousand demonstrators, on the 37th Friday weekly protest, demonstrators called for all members of the system of power in place to be dismissed and for a radical change in the political system. They rejected the 12 December election, with slogans describing it as "an election with the gangs" and as an "election organised by a corrupt power [which] is a trap for idiots"

=== Prominent individuals and organisations ===
Former prime minister Ahmed Benbitour, former minister Abdelaziz Rahabi, Ali Fawzi Rebaine, Mohamed Said and Rachid Nekkaz, announced that they are not candidates because of the political climate.

On 28 September, Abdallah Djaballah, president of the Justice and Development Front, announced that his party will not take part in the elections. This was followed by the Society for Peace Movement, which made a similar decision for the same reasons.

The Forces of the Democratic Alternative, a coalition including the Socialist Forces Front (FFS), the Rally for Culture and Democracy (RCD), the Workers' Party (PT), the Socialist Workers Party (PST), the Union for Change and Progress (UCP), the Democratic and Social Movement (MDS), the Party for Secularism and Democracy (PLD) and the Algerian League for the Defense of Human Rights (LADDH), announced their refusal to participate in the vote.

=== Mayors ===
In September, 56 mayors in Kabylie stated that they would refuse to organise the practical aspects of the 12 December election in their municipalities and would do everything in their power to prevent the election taking place.

== Results ==
Preliminary results showed that former Prime Minister and Minister of Housing Abdelmadjid Tebboune won the election in the first round, leading his nearest opponent (Abdelkader Bengrina of the Islamist El Binaa party) by over 40% of the valid votes. The official estimate of the turnout of just under 40% of eligible voters was the lowest of any Algerian presidential election held since independence, primarily due to boycotts by citizens and political parties alike. The Rally for Culture and Democracy estimated the turnout five times lower, at 8%. The low turnout, as well as the relatively high number of spoiled ballots out of those who did participate, was seen as a continuation of the pro-democracy protests that preceded the resignation of Abdelaziz Bouteflika, as all approved candidates in the election were seen as members of the political establishment.

Candidate	Party	Votes	%
Abdelmadjid Tebboune	Independent	4,947,523	58.13
Abdelkader Bengrina	National Construction Movement	1,477,836	17.37
Ali Benflis	Vanguard of Freedoms	897,831	10.55
Azzedine Mihoubi	Democratic National Rally	619,225	7.28
Abdelaziz Belaïd	Future Front	568,000	6.67
Total		8,510,415	100.00
Valid votes		8,510,415	87.24
Invalid/blank votes		1,244,925	12.76
Total votes		9,755,340	100.00
Registered voters/turnout		24,464,161	39.88
Source: Journal Officiel Algérie
