= Mohamed Hardi =

Algerian minister

Mohamed Hardi (16 March 1943 – 4 May 1996) was the Algerian minister for the interior and local collectives in the 1992 government of Belaid Abdessalam.

== See also ==
- Cabinet of Algeria
