= List of presidents of the Council of the Nation =

President of Council of the Nation
- رئيس مجلس الأمة
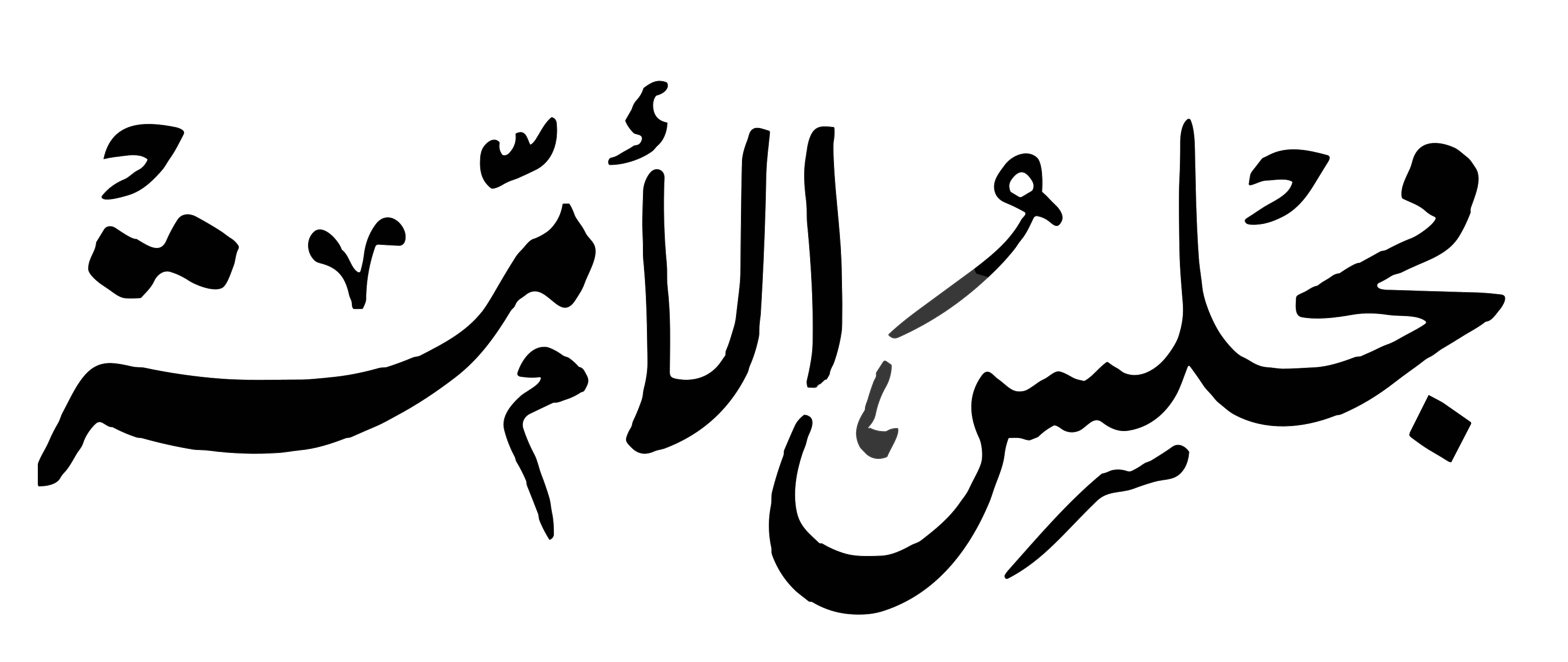
- Incumbent; Azouz Nasri since 19 May 2025
- Council of the Nation
- Style: Mister President of the Council
- Formation: 5 January 1998
- First holder: Bachir Boumaza
- Website: majliselouma.dz

The president of the Council of the Nation of Algeria is the presiding officer of that body. From the creation of the Council of the Nation on 5 January 1998, it is the upper house of the Parliament of Algeria.

== List ==
=== Legend ===
Political parties:

FLN
RND
Independent

| Name | Portrait | Took office | Left office | Political party |
|---|---|---|---|---|
| 1 | Bachir Boumaza | 5 January 1998 | 15 January 2000 | National Liberation Front |
| 2 | Mohammed Cherif Messadia | 16 January 2000 | 1 June 2002 | National Liberation Front |
| 3 | Abdelkader Bensalah | 2 July 2002 | 9 April 2019 | National Rally for Democracy |
| - | Salah Goudjil | 9 April 2019 | 24 February 2021 | National Liberation Front |
| 4 | Salah Goudjil | 24 February 2021 | 19 May 2025 | National Liberation Front |
| 5 | Azouz Nasri | 19 May 2025 | Incumbent | Independent |
