= Slimane Chenine =

Algerian politician

- سليمان شنين

President of the People's National Assembly
- In office 10 July 2019 – 18 February 2021
- Preceded by: Mouad Bouchareb

Slimane Chenine is an Algerian politician. He served as president of the lower house of Algeria's parliament, the People's National Assembly, from 10 July 2019 until the parliament dissolved on 18 February 2021.

In September 2021, Chenine was appointed ambassador to Libya.
